= List of universities in Sarajevo =

== Public ==
- University of Sarajevo (Sarajevo);
- University of East Sarajevo (East Sarajevo);

== Private (including standalone faculties and high colleges) ==
- International University of Sarajevo (Sarajevo);
- Sarajevo School of Science and Technology (Sarajevo);
- International Burch University (Sarajevo);
- American University in Bosnia and Herzegovina (Sarajevo and Tuzla);
