= Kešeljević =

Keseljevic (Serbian Cyrillic: Кешељевић) and Kešelj (Кешељ) are two Serbian surnames worn by families which have common origin. The Kešeljevići and Andrijaševići in Grahovo, Nikšić are branches of the Mandić brotherhood of Drobnjaci. The Kešeljević hail from Kešeljeva Gradina in Grahovo. Kešeljević families exist in Herzegovina and Bosnia (1930). The surname was also found in Kosovo and Metohija. Stanko Kešeljević left for Visoko in Bosnia in the mid-18th century. The Kešeljević family in Visoko died out on the male line. In Rakovica, the Orthodox families of Tolj, Milić and Kešelj are the oldest families in the settlement. Several Kešeljević were among the first Montenegrins in America.

== Notable people ==
Kešeljević

- Aleksandar Kešeljević, Slovenian economist
- Jelena Kešeljević, Yugoslav actress
- Vlada Kešeljević, actor
- Đorđe Kešeljević, World War II commander of the 83rd Fighter Aviation Regiment
- Nikola Kešeljević (1890–), academic, born in Grahovo

Kešelj

- Marko Kešelj, Serbian basketball player
- Mitar Kešelj, vojvoda of Nevesinje (1875–1878)
- Rade Kešelj, barjaktar (1875–1878)
- Miloš Kešelj, Herzegovinian rebel emissary (1875–1878)
