= Jasen (Ilidža) =

Jasen Јасен
- Village
- Location within Bosnia and Herzegovina
- Coordinates: 43°45′27″N 18°20′53″E
- Country: Bosnia and Herzegovina
- Entity: Federation of Bosnia and Herzegovina
- Canton: Sarajevo
- Municipality: Ilidža

Area
  - Total: 2.07 sq mi (5.37 km^{2})

Population (2013)
  - Total: 9
  - Density: 4.3/sq mi (1.7/km^{2})
- Time zone: UTC+1 (CET)
  - Summer (DST): UTC+2 (CEST)

Jasen (Serbian Cyrillic: Јасен) is a village in Bosnia and Herzegovina. According to the 1991 census, the village is located in the municipality of Ilidža.

== Demographics ==
According to the 2013 census, its population was 9.

Ethnicity in 2013
Ethnicity	Number	Percentage
Serbs	7	77.8%
Bosniaks	2	22.2%
Total	9	100%
