= Zenik =

Zenik Зеник
- Village
- Location within Bosnia and Herzegovina
- Coordinates: 43°53′42″N 18°13′18″E
- Country: Bosnia and Herzegovina
- Entity: Federation of Bosnia and Herzegovina
- Canton: Sarajevo
- Municipality: Ilidža

Area
  - Total: 2.14 sq mi (5.55 km^{2})

Population (2013)
  - Total: 108
  - Density: 50.4/sq mi (19.5/km^{2})
- Time zone: UTC+1 (CET)
  - Summer (DST): UTC+2 (CEST)

Zenik (Serbian Cyrillic: Зеник) is a village in Bosnia and Herzegovina. According to the 1991 census, the village is located in the municipality of Ilidža.

== Demographics ==
According to the 2013 census, its population was 108.

Ethnicity in 2013
Ethnicity	Number	Percentage
Bosniaks	103	95.4%
other/undeclared	5	4.6%
Total	108	100%
