= Vrelo Bosne =

Public park in Bosnia and Herzegovina

- Spomenik prirode Vrelo Bosne
- IUCN category III (natural monument or feature)
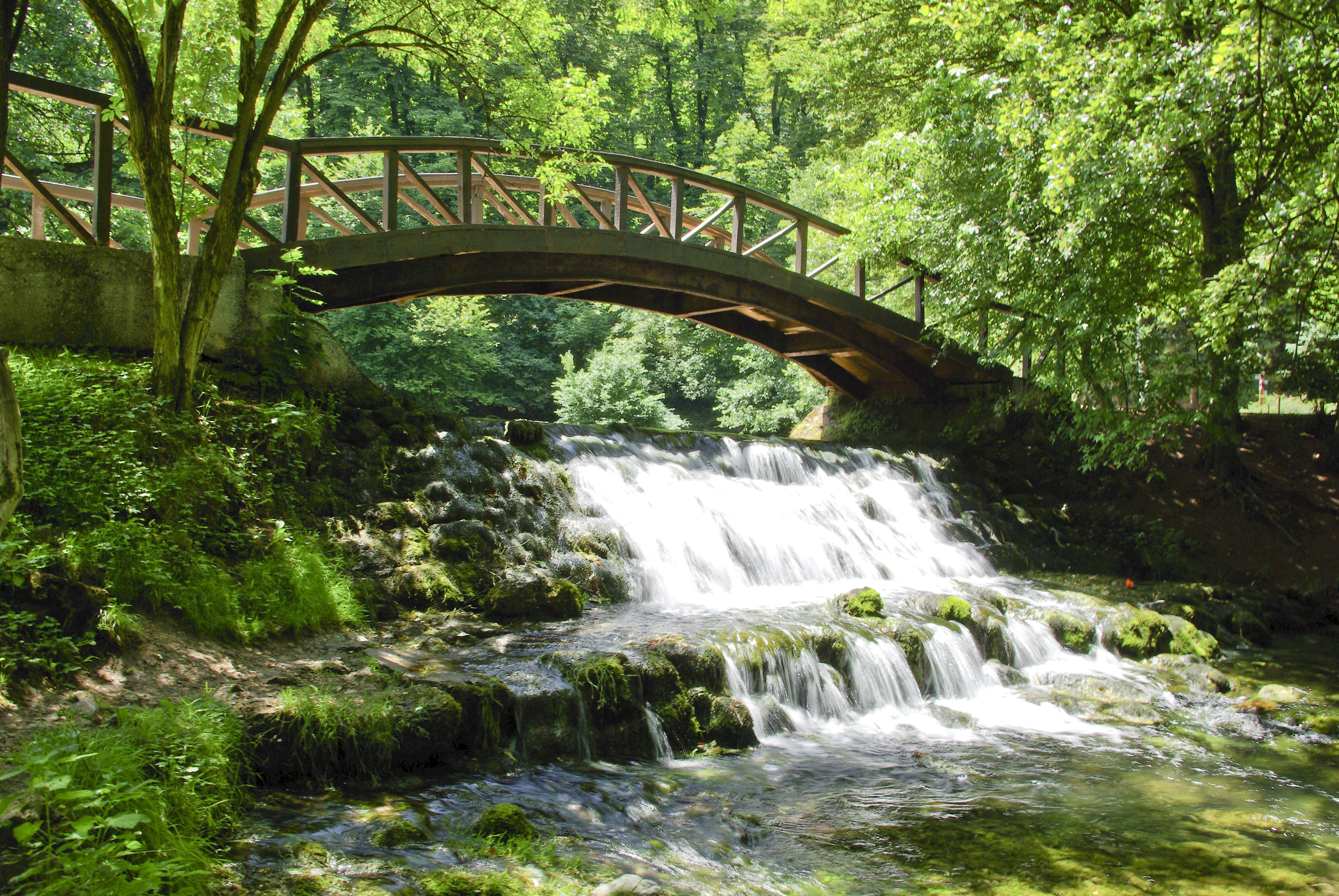
- A bridge near the spring of the Bosna river

- Location within Bosnia and Herzegovina
- Interactive map of Vrelo Bosne
- Location: Sarajevo Canton, Bosnia and Herzegovina
- Nearest city: Sarajevo
- Coordinates: 43.818867°N 18.269447°E
- Area: 6.03 km^{2} (2.33 sq mi)
- Average elevation: 520 m (1,710 ft); (494.5 m (1,622 ft) a.s.l. according to an earlier source)
- Established: 1995
- Visitors: Open all year (in Open all year)
- Operator: Kantonalna javna ustanova za zaštićena prirodna područja – ZPPKS
- Website: www.zppks.ba

Vrelo Bosne (pronounced [ʋrê.lo bôs.neː]; transl. Spring of the Bosna) is a public park and a protected Nature Monument established around the source of the Bosna river, featuring the system of numerous springs at the foothills of Mount Igman, in the municipality of Ilidža, on the outskirts of Sarajevo, capital of Bosnia and Herzegovina. Vrelo Bosne is one of the country's popular natural landmarks and provides a quiet escape from city life.

== Geography and hydrology ==
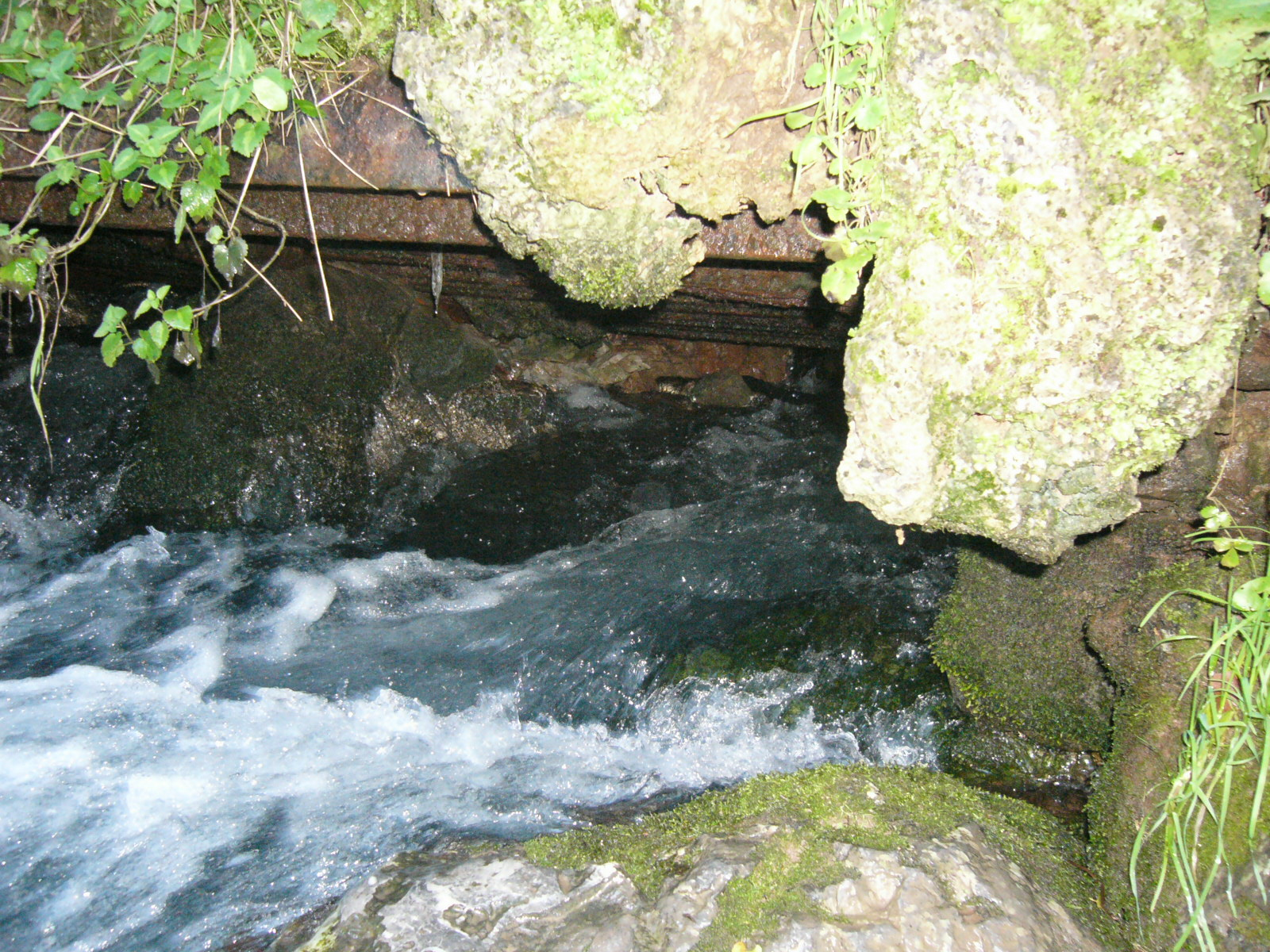
Main spring of the River Bosna under Mount Igman

The Mala Bosna is the first section of the Bosna, and its source is the Vrelo Bosne spring, located at 520 m (1,710 ft) a.s.l. (according to an earlier source, 494.5 m (1,622 ft) a.s.l.) at the foothills of mount Igman, on the outskirts of Sarajevo, capital of Bosnia and Herzegovina. The spring is one of Bosnia and Herzegovina's chief natural landmarks and tourist attractions.

== Biodiversity ==
Typical animals are ducks and swans among others.

== History, archaeology and culture ==
A Roman Bridge is located not far from Vrelo Bosne on the Bosna river in the Ilidža municipality, which was built sometime between 1530 and 1550 from the original Roman stones and ruins of the bridge that stood there during the Roman period used to connect the Romans with the village of Aquae Sulphurae at the time. Ilidža is also known to have been an archaeological site dating 2400–2000BC.

The straight main avenue (Velika Aleja) leading inside contains traditional buildings from the Austro-Hungarian-era offering a peek into the luxuries of the past.

During the Bosnian War the park was not maintained and trees were chopped and used for heating by the local citizens. In 2000 the park was restored to its former look by local youths led by an international ecological organization.

== Park entry and features ==
On a typical year more than 60,000 tourists visit the park.

The park is usually entered by foot or by horse-carriage via the 3 kilometre long avenue Velika Aleja (transl. Grand Avenue) leading from the hotel complex and a spa at the northeastern end, called Banja Ilidža, toward springs at the far southwestern end. There is also Mala Aleja (transl. Little Alley) which branches off towards Stojčevac to the southeast.

The paths and roads inside the park are ideal for walks and bicycle riding and give the visitors the opportunity to take a closer look at the bubbling streams and waterfalls. Outdoor cafés and restaurants are available offering drinks and food but opening times vary from season to season.

- Adults: 2 KM
- Pensioners, students, disabled: 1 KM
- Children from 7–16 years old: 1 KM
- Children with special needs or up to 7 years old: Entry free

Money from the park entry fees is used to up-keep the park by KJU Zaštićena prirodna područja Kantona Sarajevo.

The spring water at Vrelo Bosne is drinkable, however not recommended.

== Photo gallery ==
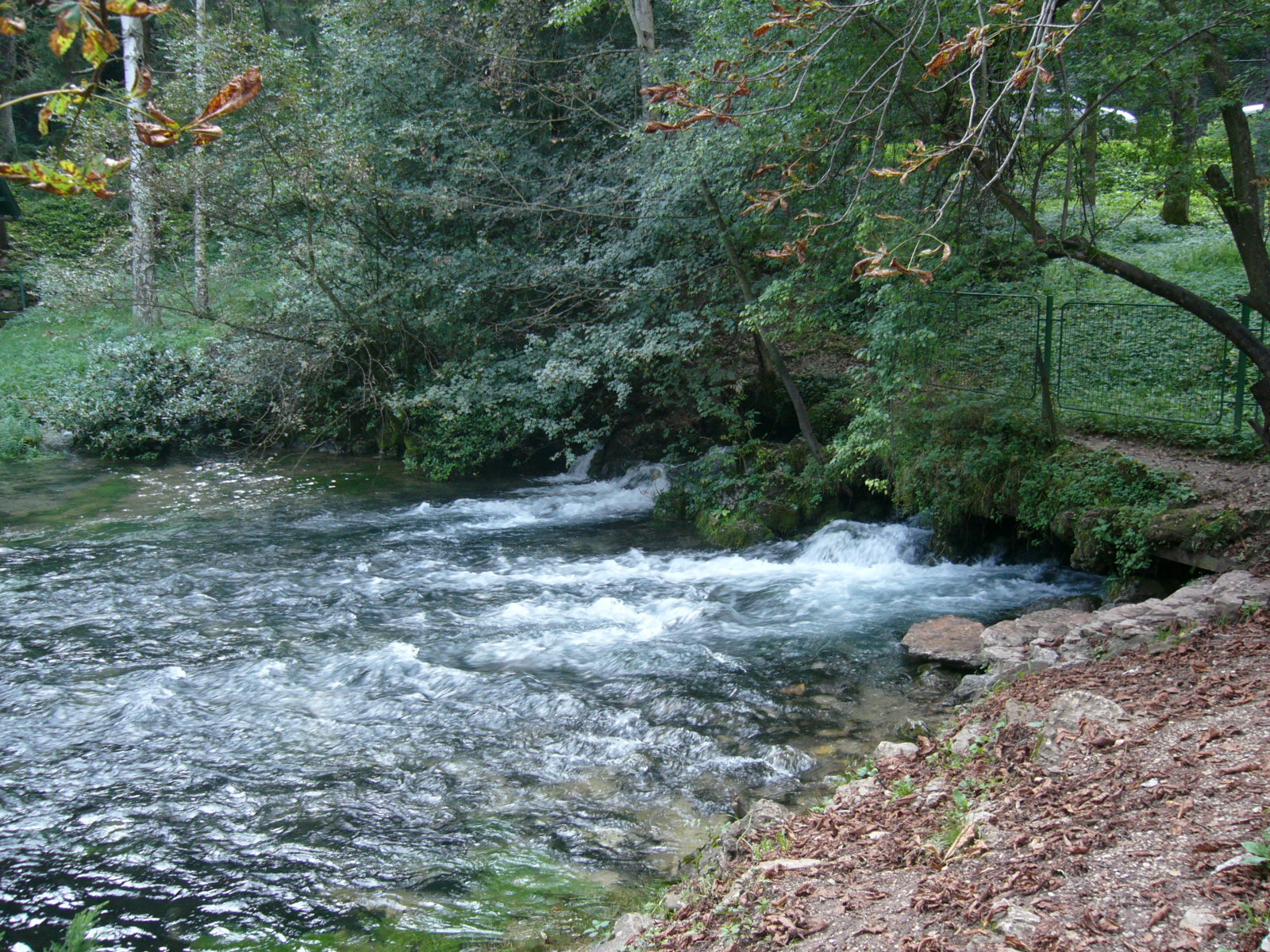
Spring of the River Bosna, Sarajevo (Autumn 2005)

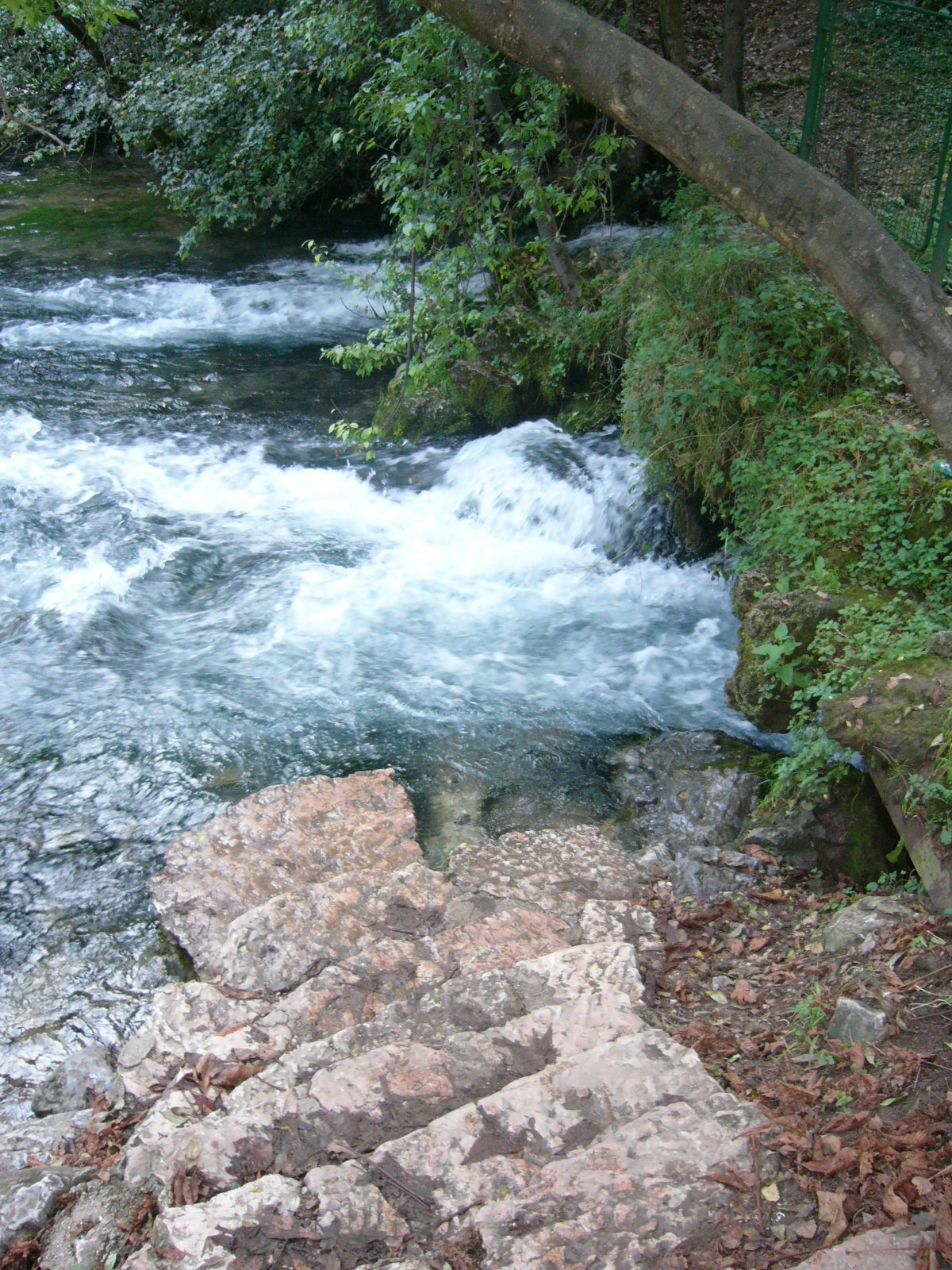
Spring of the River Bosna, Sarajevo

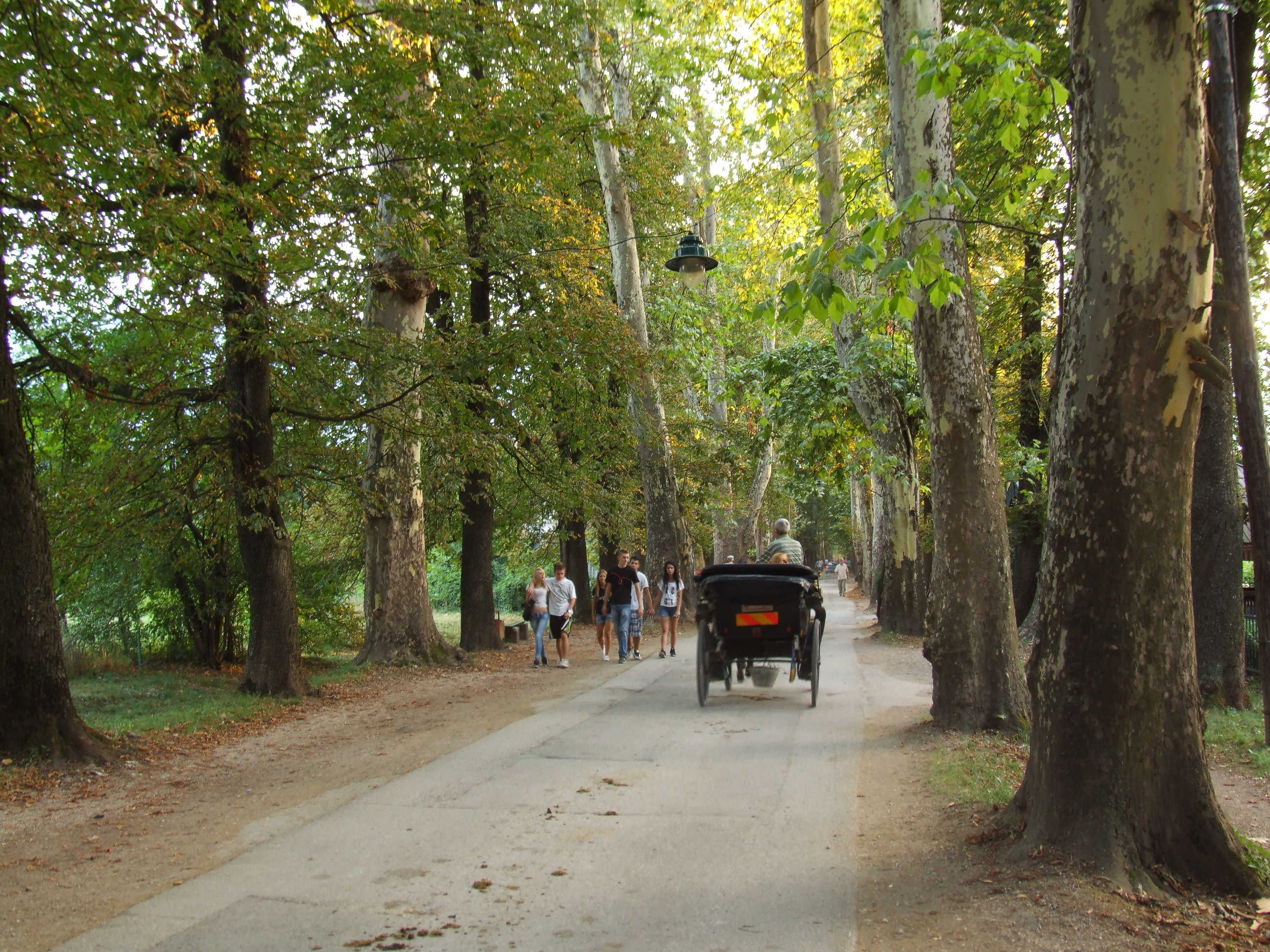
Horse carriage (Velika aleja)

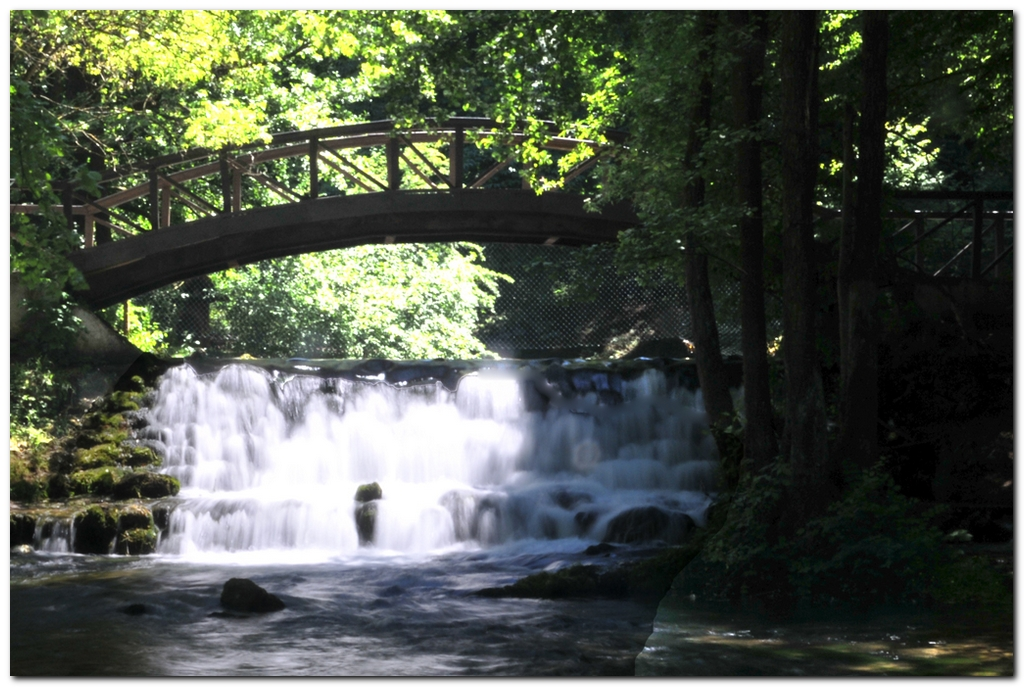
Vrelo Bosne Bridge

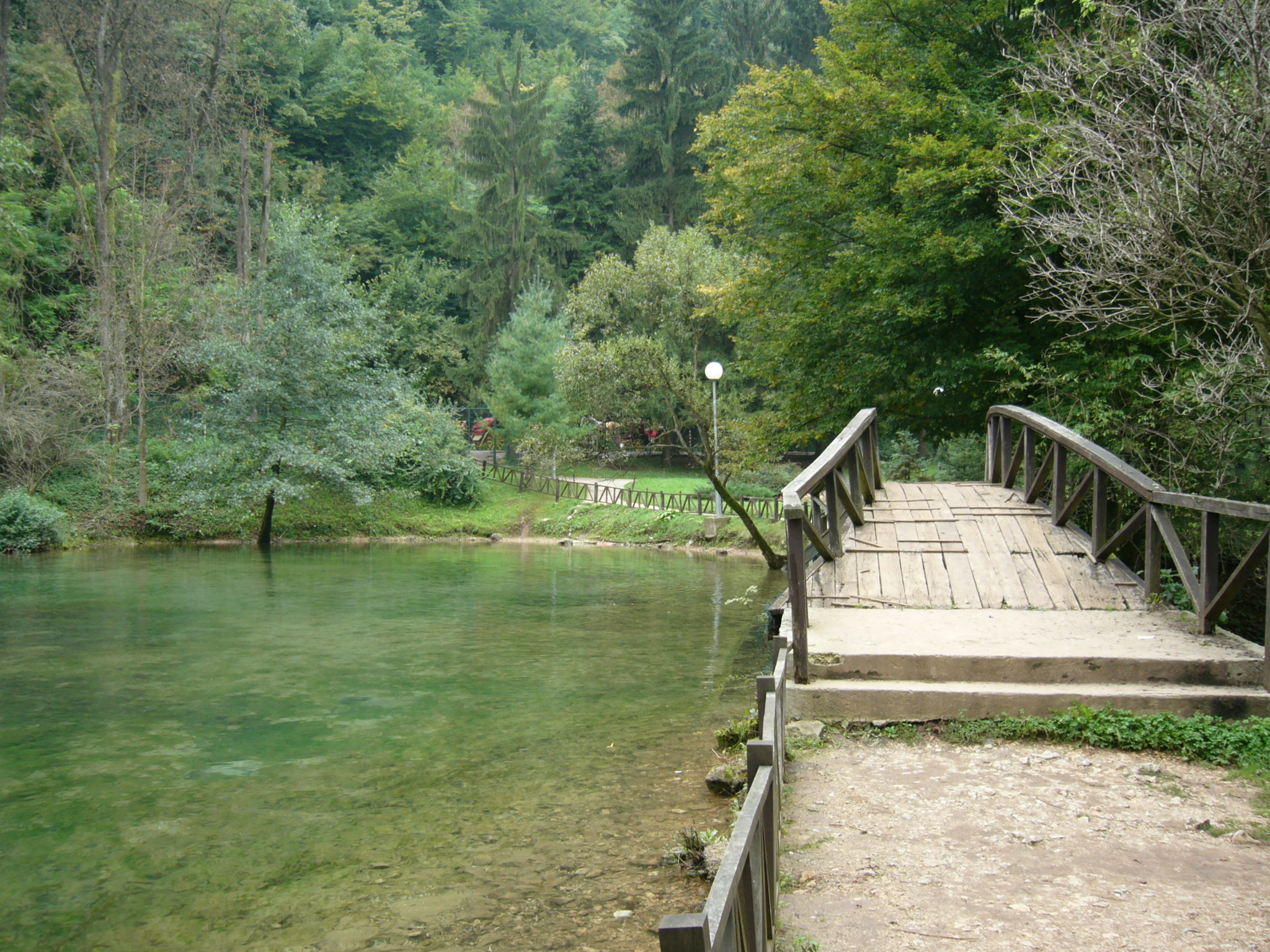
Vrelo Bosne Park

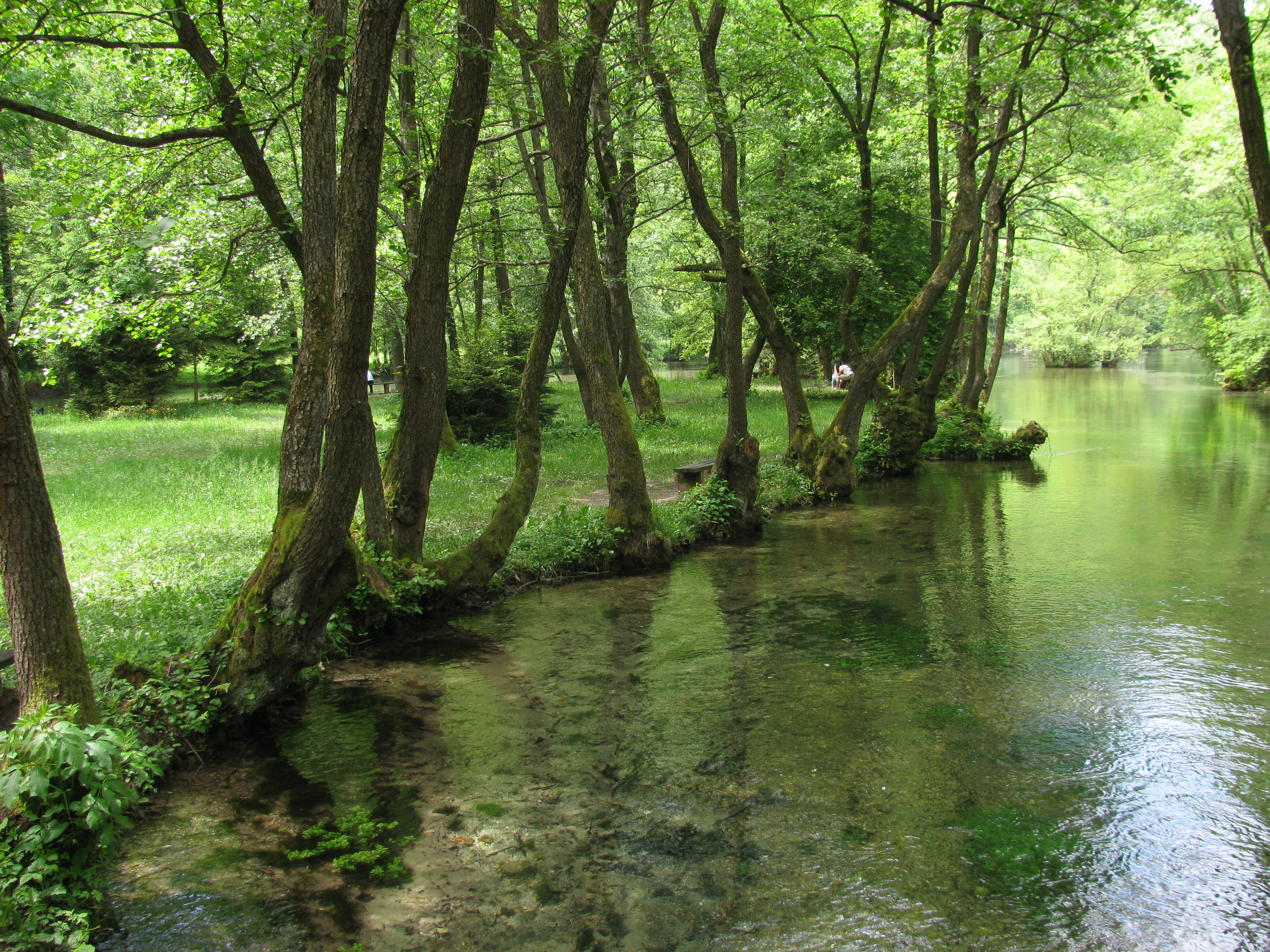
Vrelo Bosne (Summer 2010)

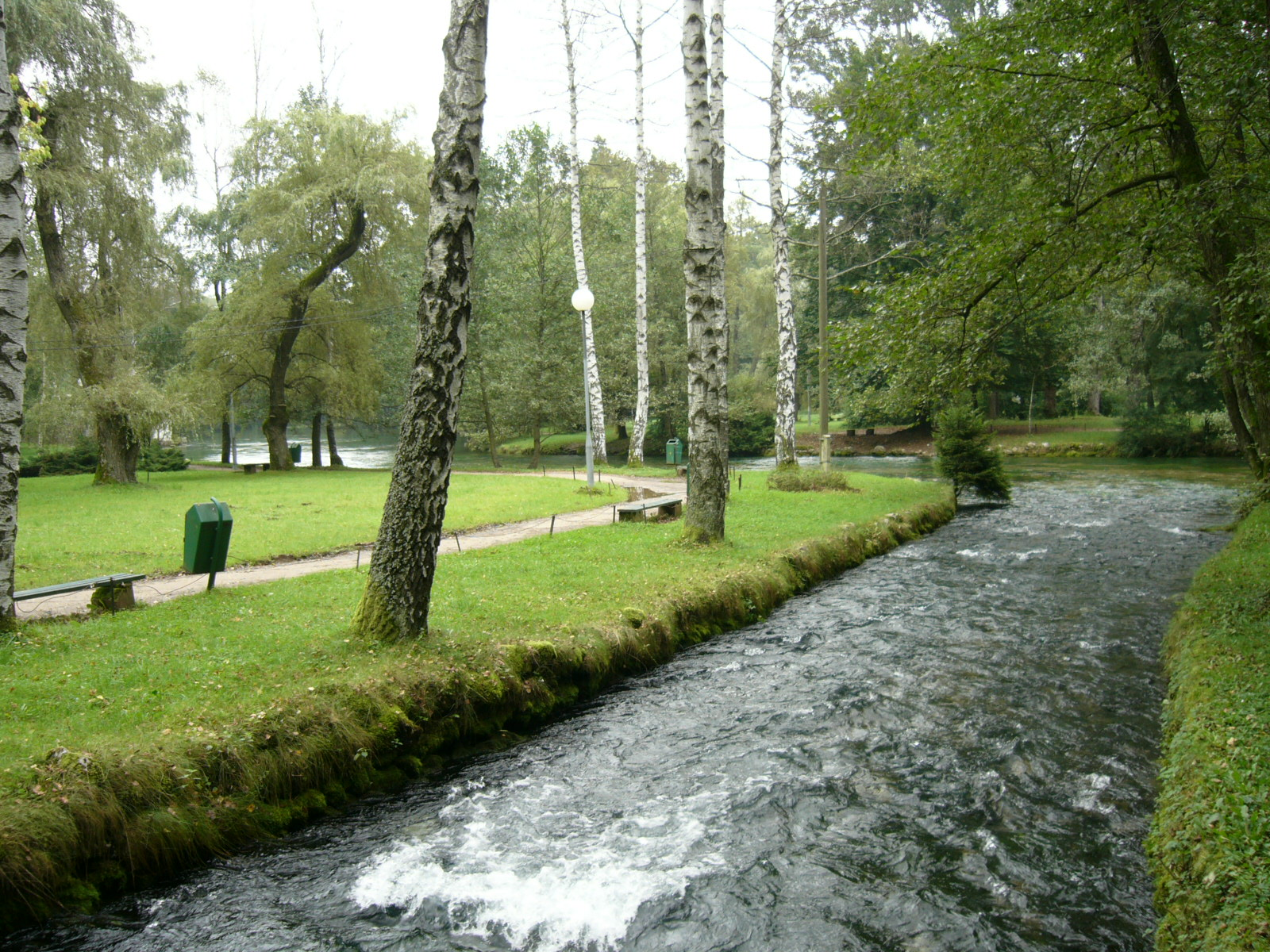
River Bosna at Vrelo Bosne

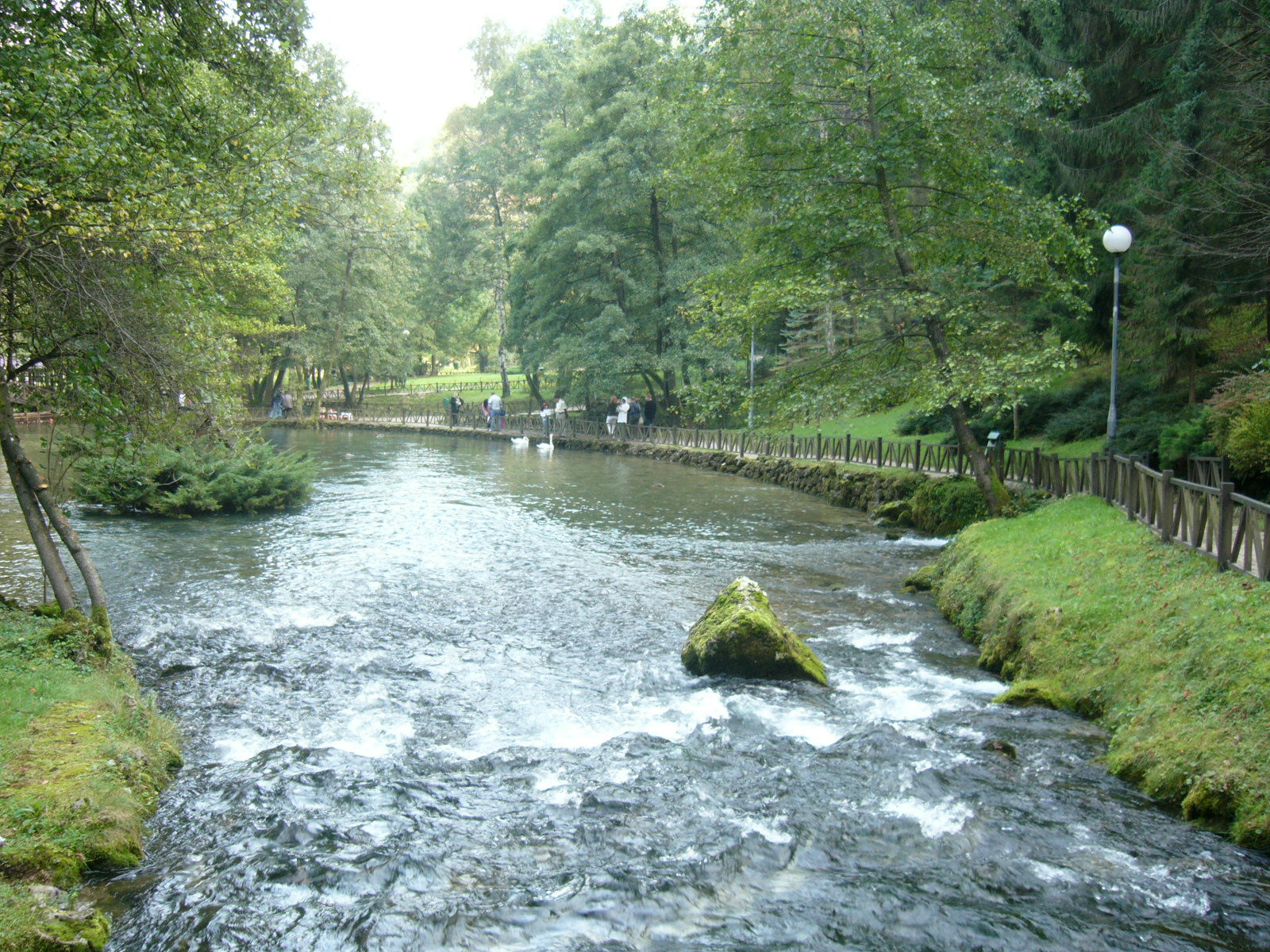
River Bosna, Sarajevo (Autumn 2005)

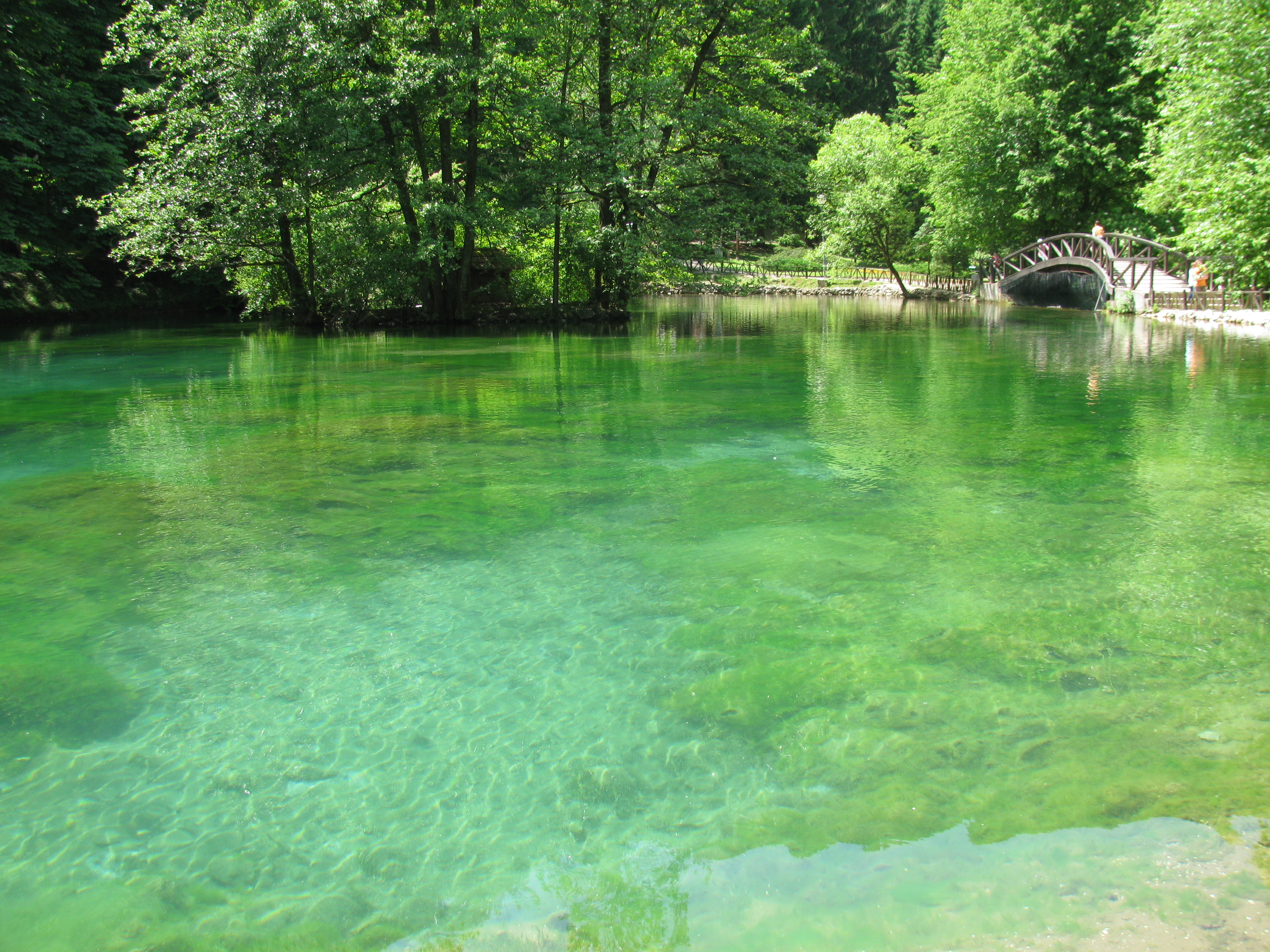
Vrelo Bosne (Summer 2010)

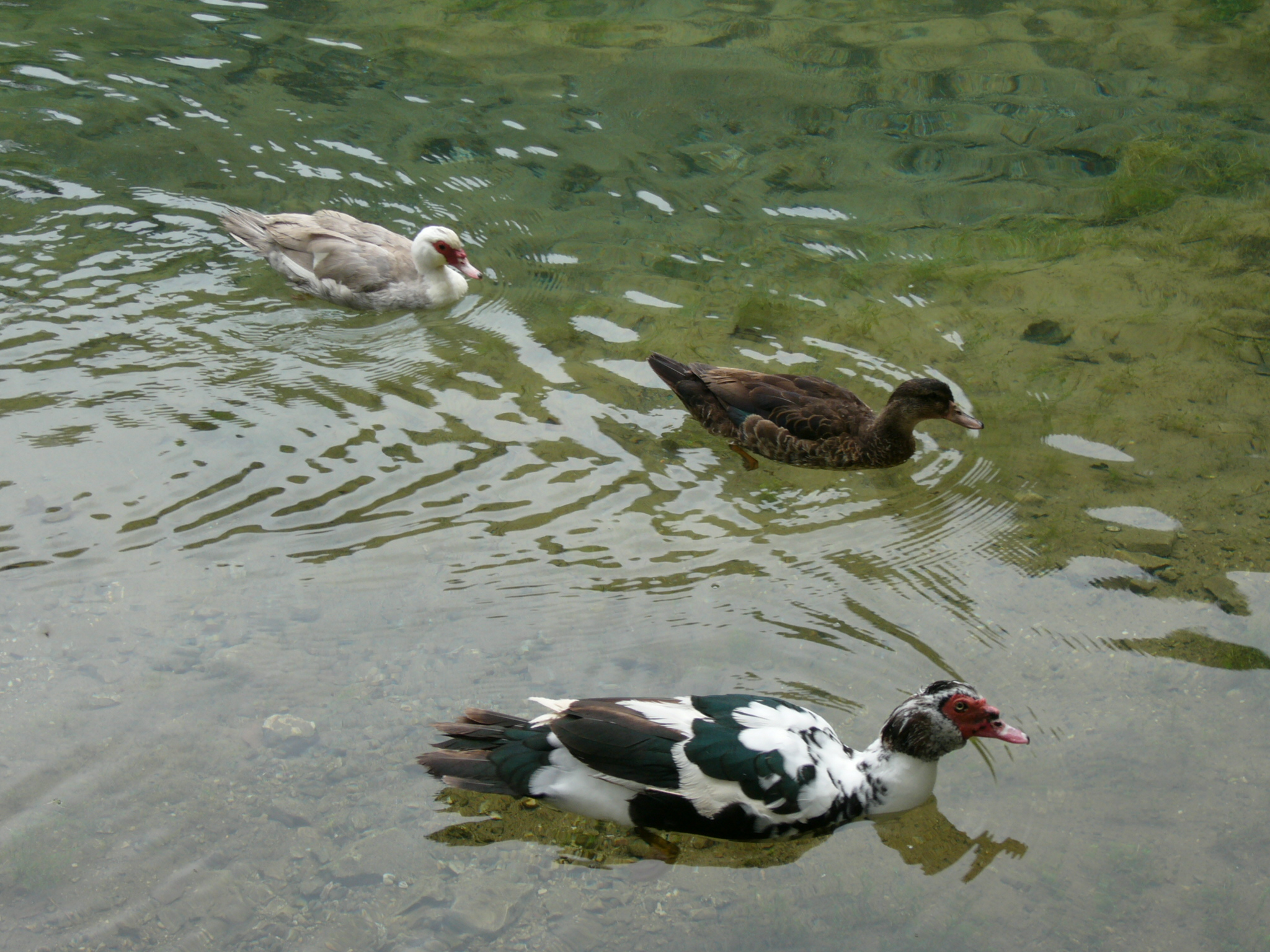
Vrelo Bosne ducks

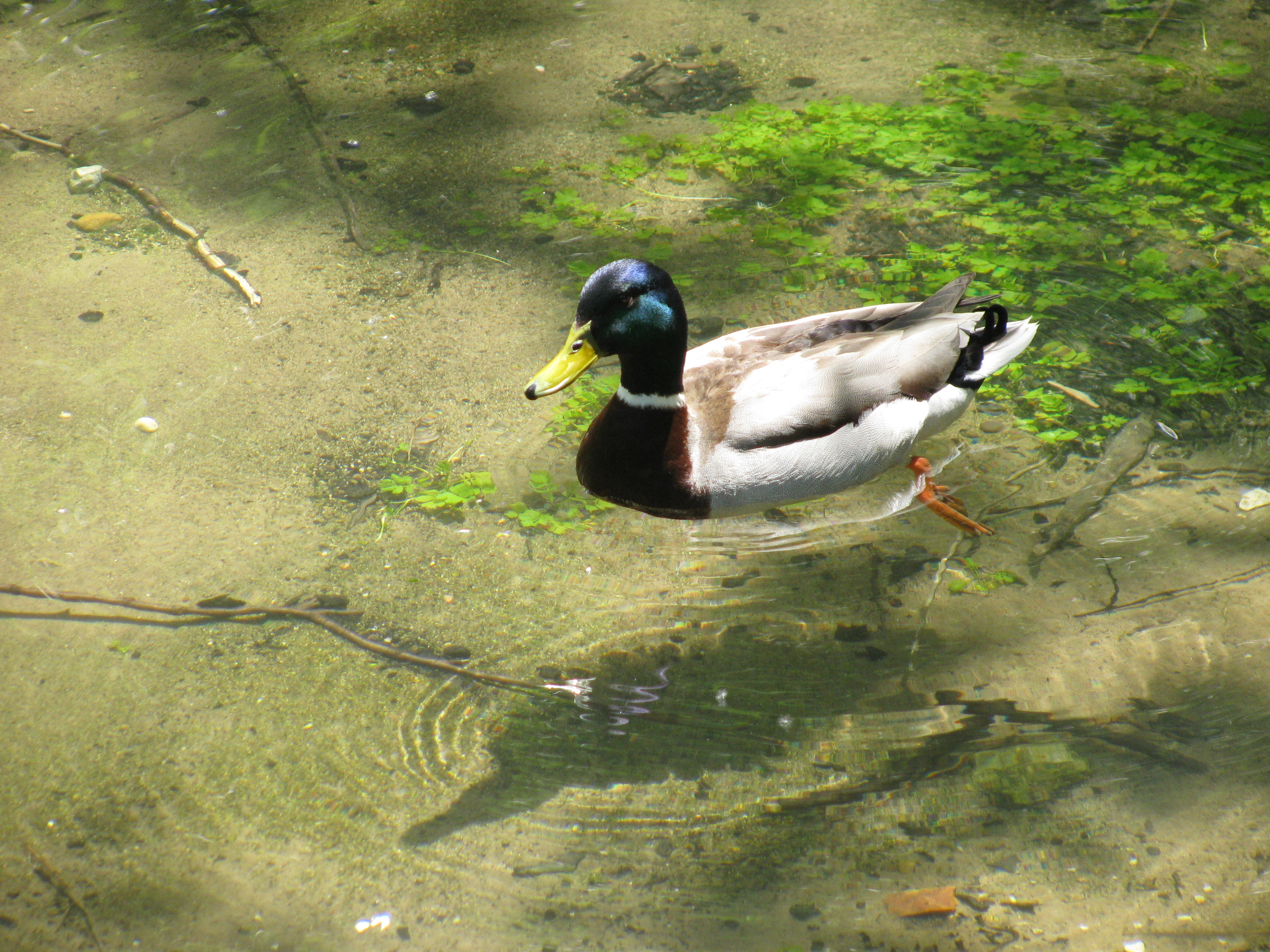
Vrelo Bosne ducks

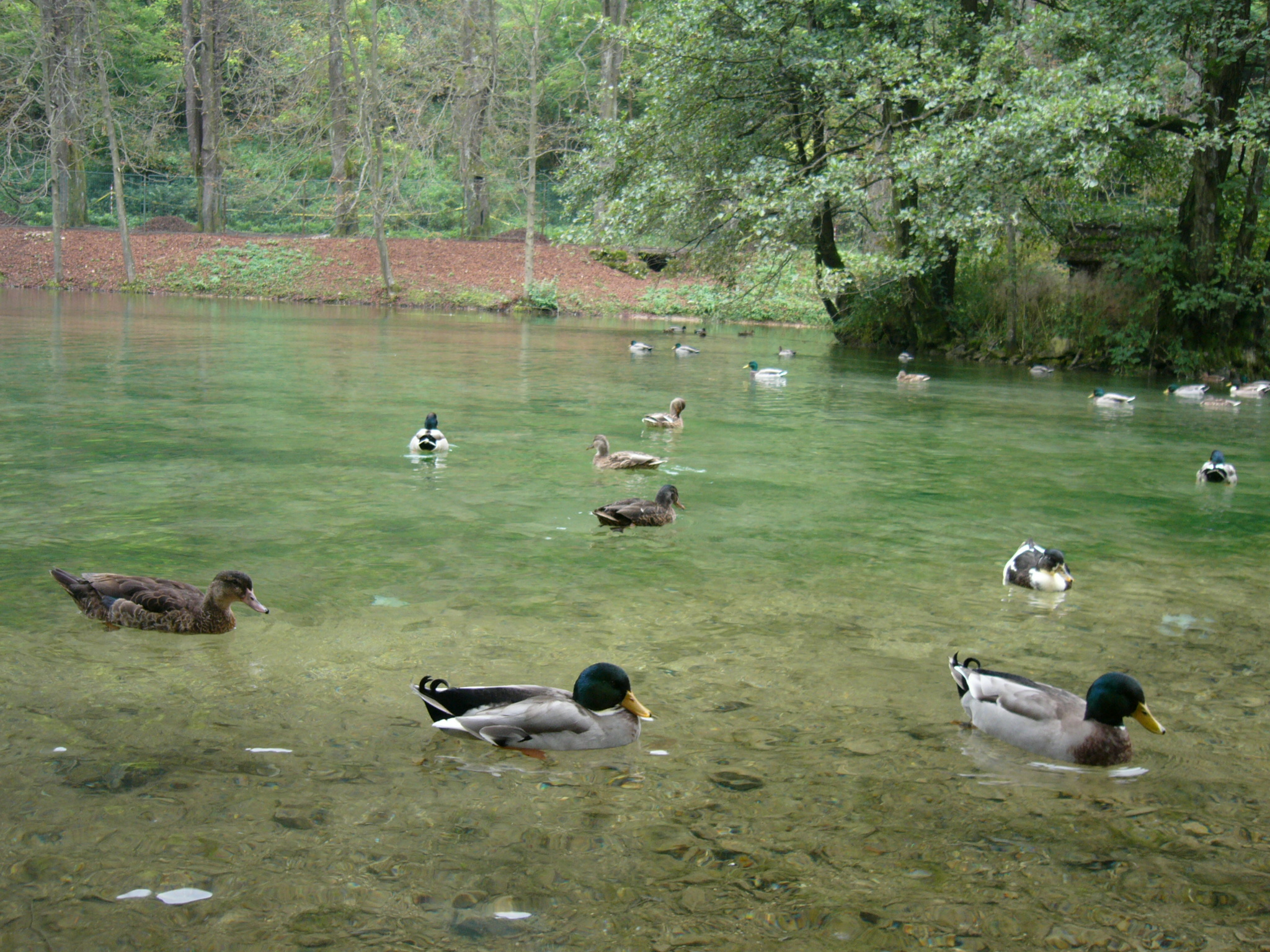
Ducks at Vrelo Bosne

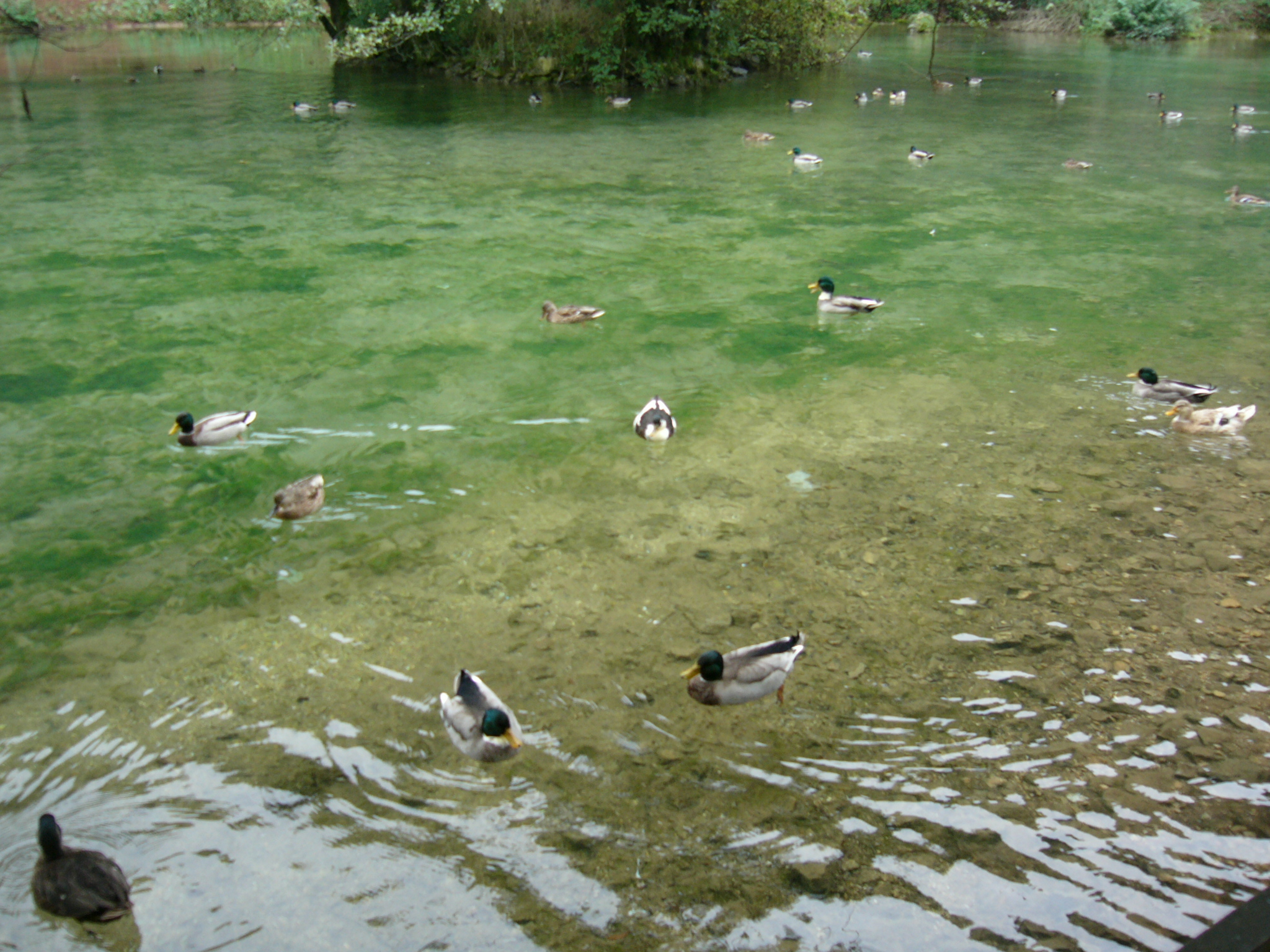
Ducks at Vrelo Bosne

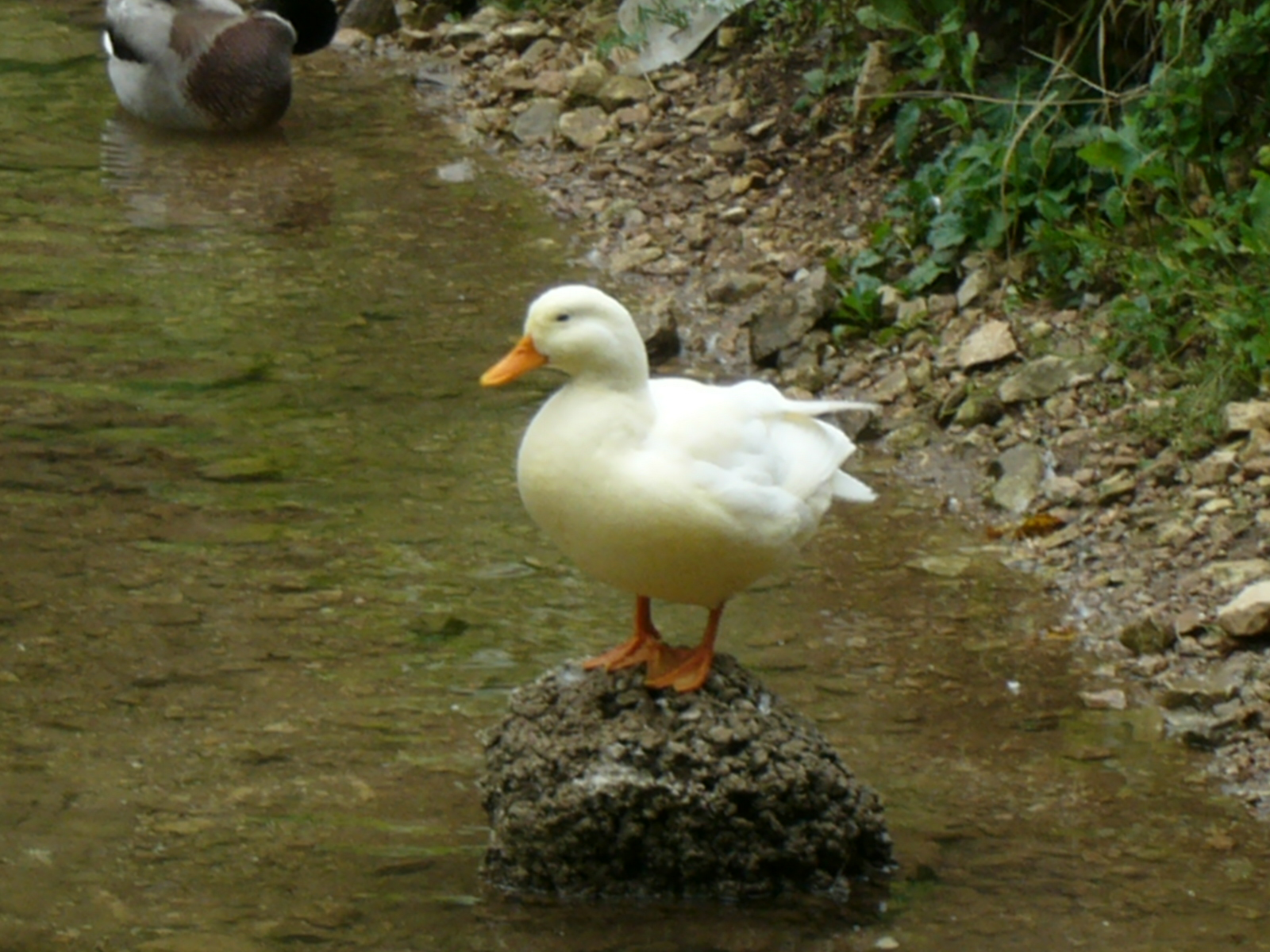
Baby duck at Vrelo Bosne

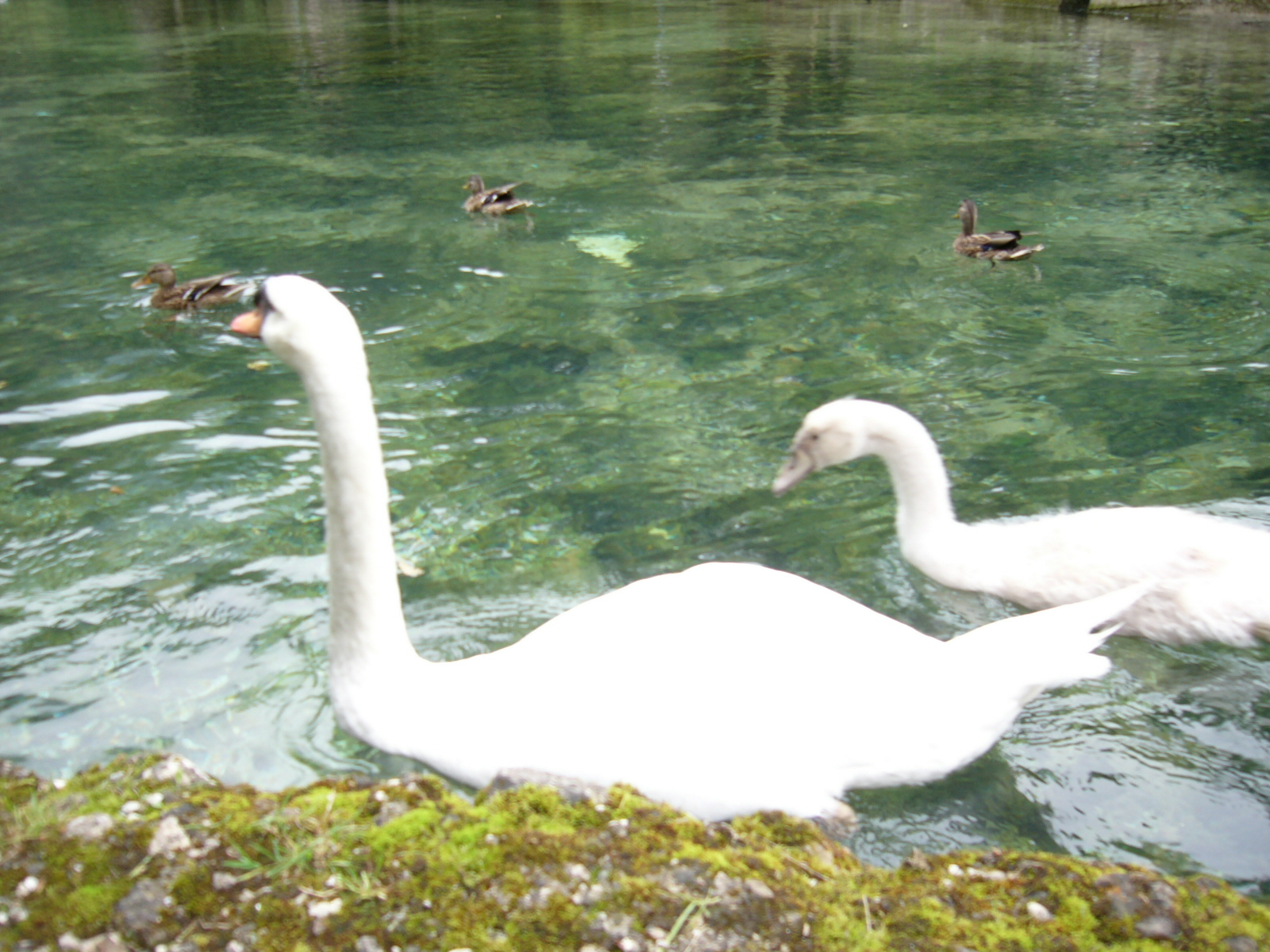
Vrelo Bosne Swans

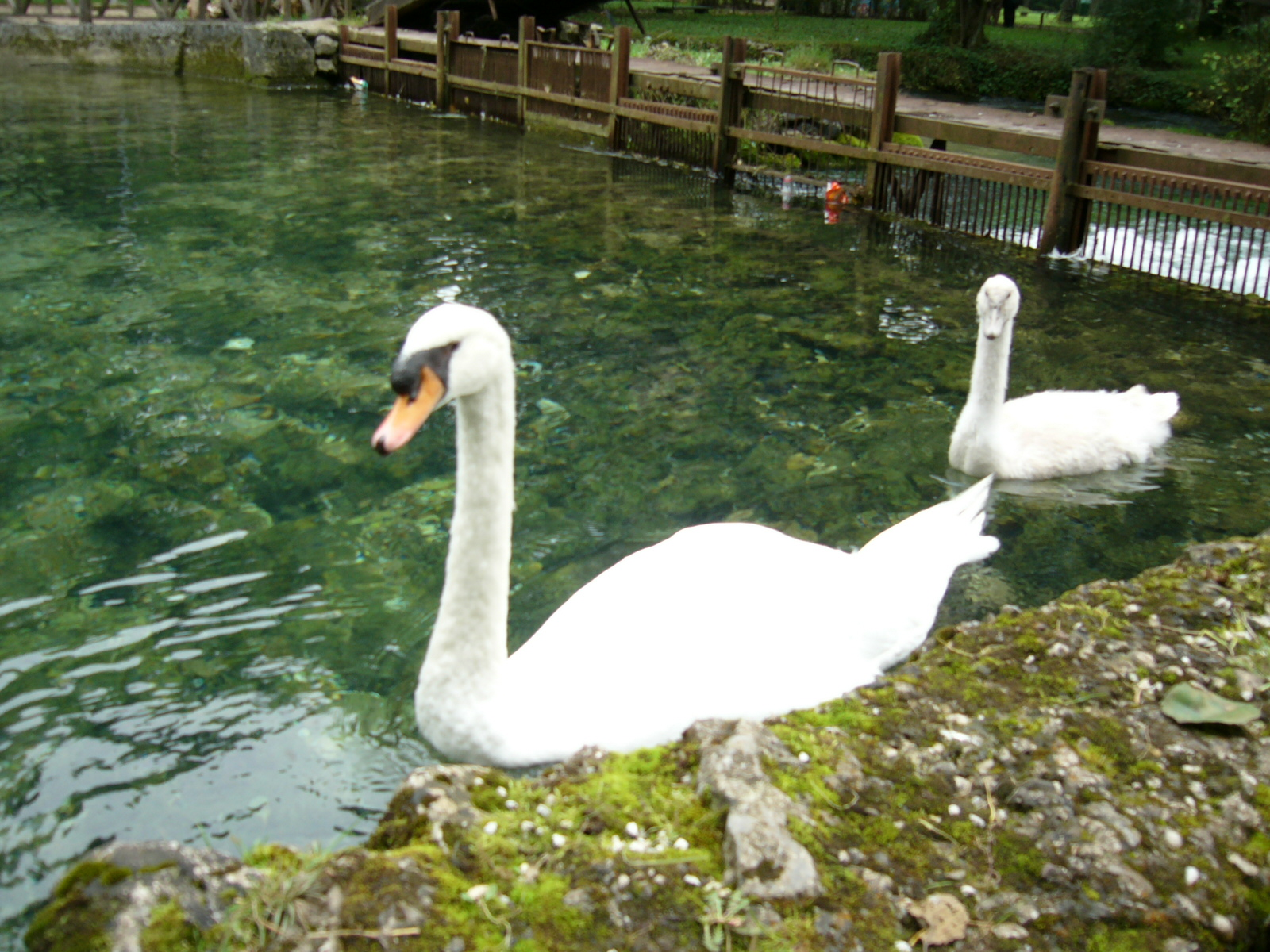
Vrelo Bosne Swans

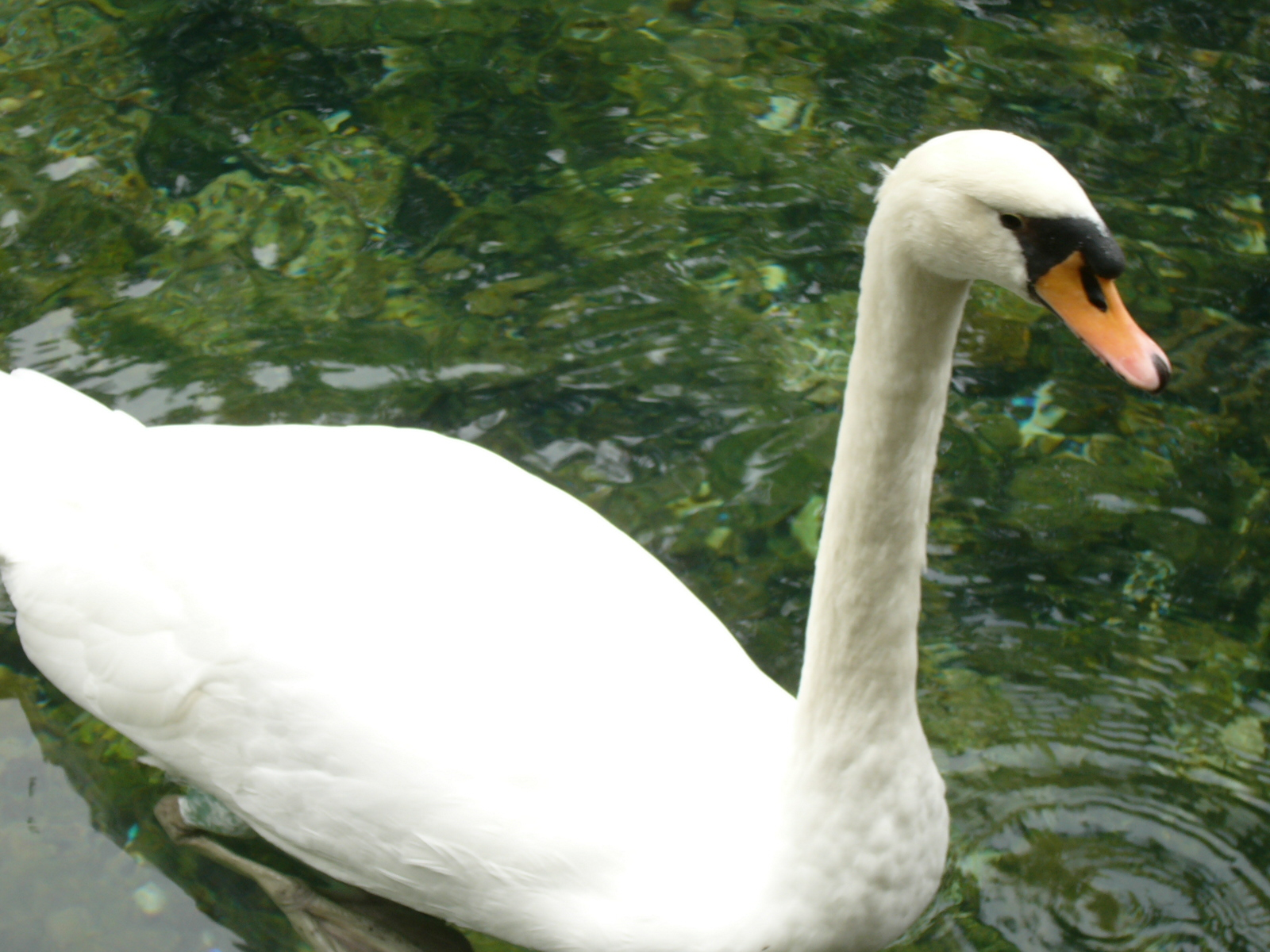
Vrelo Bosne Swans

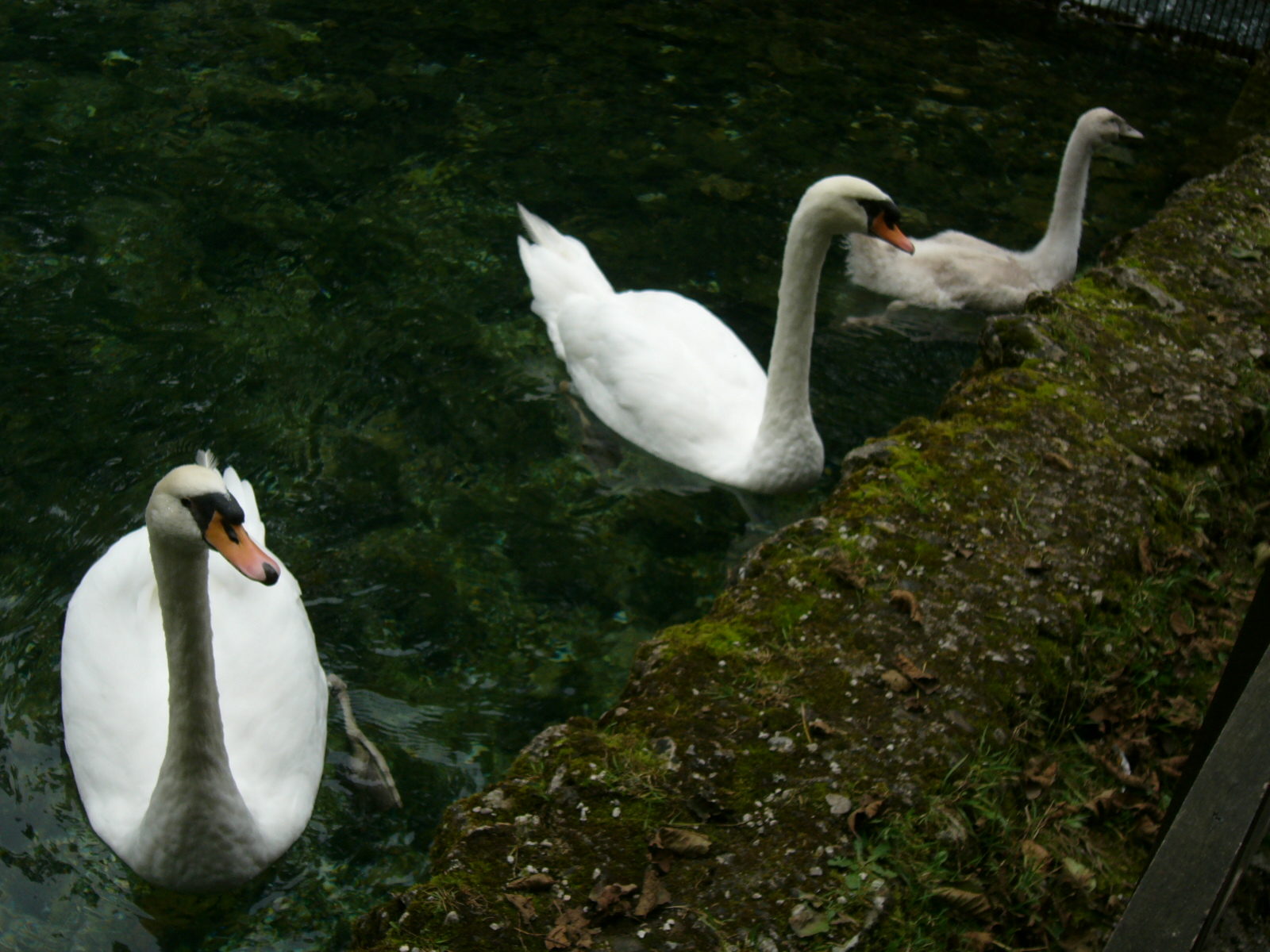
Vrelo Bosne Swans

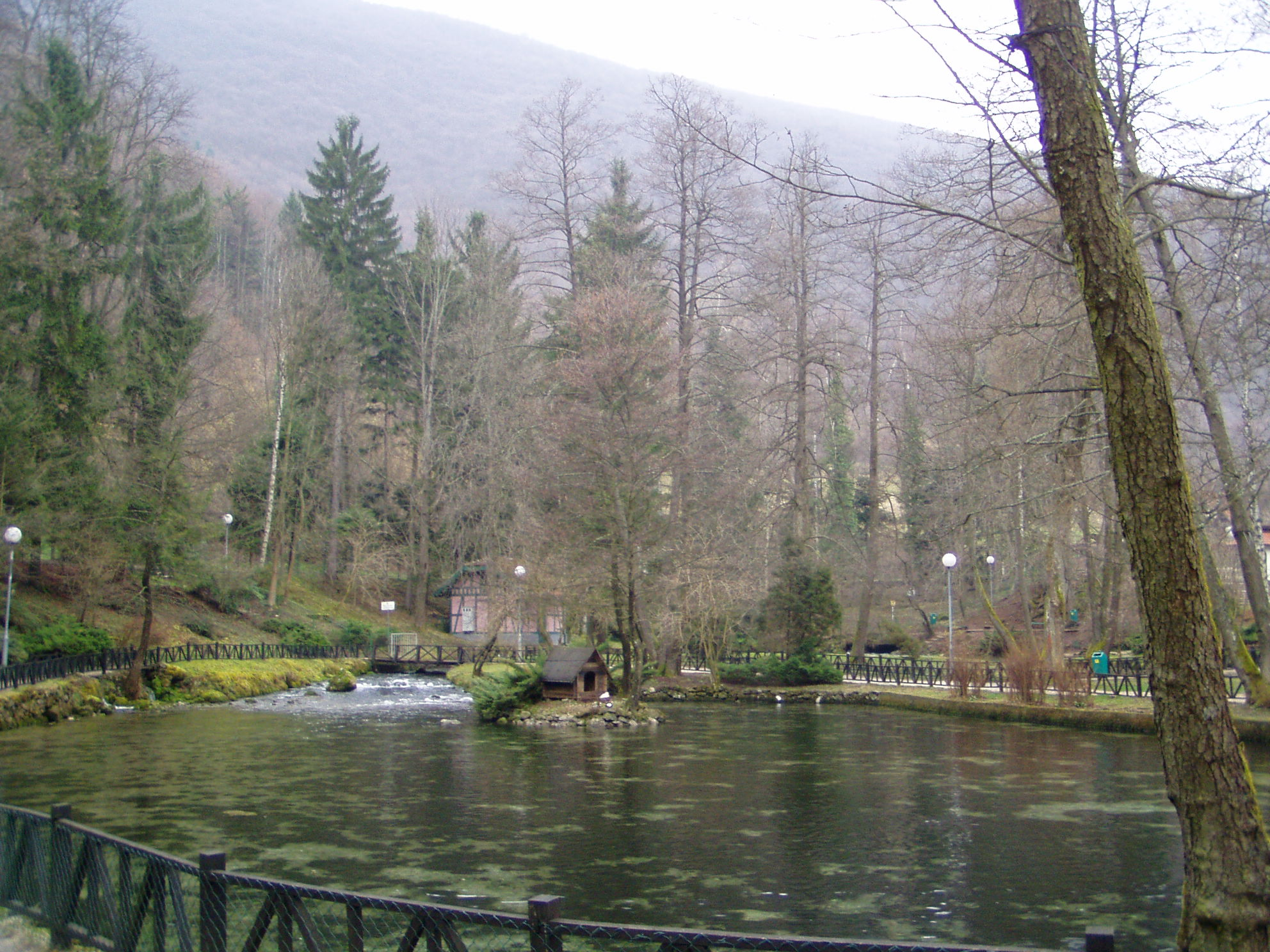
Vrelo Bosne in winter

== Trivia ==
Bosnia and Herzegovina national football team is known to hold their training sessions at the Vrelo Bosne park. Team also stays at near by Hotel Hercegovina.

== See also ==
- List of rivers of Bosnia and Herzegovina
