= Film.factory =

Experimental school for film studies

Sarajevo Film Factory, or film.factory, was an international experimental doctoral school for film studies created in 2013 by Béla Tarr. Based in Sarajevo, the project ended in 2017.

== About ==
In February 2013, the Sarajevo School of Science and Technology opened the first session of film.factory. This is a three-year doctoral course set up by the Hungarian filmmaker Béla Tarr within the Sarajevo Film Academy, with the involvement of many independent filmmakers from around the world.

The program comprises three main activities. The first consists of practical work in the form of workshops. The second consists of intensive weeks with one or two filmmakers from around the world. The third activity involves the production of short films and a feature film. Critic Jonathan Rosenbaum shares his experience of participating in film.factory. The first students graduated in 2016. There were seven of them, and they founded the BISTRIK7 collective to continue working together. The film factory project ended in 2017.

== Staff ==
- Béla Tarr, Hungarian filmmaker
- Fridrik Thor Fridriksson, Icelandic film director
- Jean-Michel Frodon, film historian
- Jonathan Romney
- Thierry Garrel
- Ulrich Gregor
- Tilda Swinton, British actress
- Gus Van Sant, American filmmaker
- Jonathan Rosenbaum, film critic
- Manuel Grosso
- Carlos Reygadas, Mexican filmmaker
- Aki Kaurismäki, Finnish director
- Andras Renyi
- Fred Kelemen
- Kirill Razlogov
- Jytte Jensen
- Jim Jarmusch, American director
- Atom Egoyan, Canadian director
- Apichatpong Weerasethakul, Thai film director

== Students ==
- Aleksandra Niemczyk
- André Gil Mata, Portugal
- Anton Petersen, Iceland
- Bianca Lucas, Switzerland
- Emma Rozanski, Australia
- Fernando Nogari
- Ghazi Alqudcy, Singapore
- Gonzalo Escobar Mora
- Graeme Cole, Great Britain
- Gustavo Vega, Mexico
- Kaori Oda, Japan
- Keja Ho, USA/France
- Levan Lomjaria, Georgia
- Manel Raga Raga,
- Marta Hernaiz Pidal, Mexico
- Namsuk Kim
- Patrick Marshall
- Pilar Palomero, Spain
- Stefan Malešević, Serbia
