= Vela (Ilidža) =

Vela Вела
- Village
- Location within Bosnia and Herzegovina
- Coordinates: 43°54′34″N 18°11′04″E
- Country: Bosnia and Herzegovina
- Entity: Federation of Bosnia and Herzegovina
- Canton: Sarajevo
- Municipality: Ilidža

Area
  - Total: 1.46 sq mi (3.78 km^{2})

Population (2013)
  - Total: 7
  - Density: 4.8/sq mi (1.9/km^{2})
- Time zone: UTC+1 (CET)
  - Summer (DST): UTC+2 (CEST)

Vela (Serbian Cyrillic: Вела) is a village in Bosnia and Herzegovina. According to the 1991 census, the village is located in the municipality of Ilidža.

== Demographics ==
According to the 2013 census, its population was 7.

Ethnicity in 2013
Ethnicity	Number	Percentage
Bosniaks	6	85.7%
Serbs	1	14.3%
Total	7	100%
