= Kobiljača =

- Village
- Location within Bosnia and Herzegovina
- Coordinates: 43°52′55″N 18°11′38″E
- Country: Bosnia and Herzegovina
- Entity: Federation of Bosnia and Herzegovina
- Canton: Sarajevo
- Municipality: Ilidža

Area
  - Total: 0.58 sq mi (1.50 km^{2})

Population (2013)
  - Total: 349
  - Density: 603/sq mi (233/km^{2})
- Time zone: UTC+01:00 (CET)
  - Summer (DST): UTC+02:00 (CEST)

Kobiljača is a village in Bosnia and Herzegovina. According to the 1991 census, the village is located in the municipality of Ilidža.

== Demographics ==
According to the 2013 census, its population was 349.

Ethnicity in 2013
Ethnicity	Number	Percentage
Bosniaks	247	70.8%
Croats	62	17.8%
Serbs	19	5.4%
other/undeclared	21	6.0%
Total	349	100%
