= Zoranovići =

Zoranovići Зорановићи
- Village
- Location within Bosnia and Herzegovina
- Coordinates: 43°44′53″N 18°20′00″E
- Country: Bosnia and Herzegovina
- Entity: Federation of Bosnia and Herzegovina
- Canton: Sarajevo
- Municipality: Ilidža

Area
  - Total: 2.57 sq mi (6.65 km^{2})

Population (2013)
  - Total: 4
  - Density: 1.6/sq mi (0.60/km^{2})
- Time zone: UTC+1 (CET)
  - Summer (DST): UTC+2 (CEST)

Zoranovići (Serbian Cyrillic: Зорановићи) is a village in Bosnia and Herzegovina. According to the 1991 census, the village is located in the municipality of Ilidža.

== Demographics ==
According to the 2013 census, its population was 4.

Ethnicity in 2013
Ethnicity	Number	Percentage
Bosniaks	2	50.0%
Croats	1	25.0%
Serbs	1	25.0%
Total	4	100%
