= Sarajevo School of Science and Technology =

Private university in Ilidža, Bosnia and Herzegovina

University Sarajevo School of Science and Technology
- Motto: Inventing a Better Future
- Type: Private university
- Established: 1 October 2004
- President: Ejup Ganić, Ph.D.
- Location: Sarajevo, Bosnia and Herzegovina
- Campus: Urban
- Language: English
- Colors: Red and White
- Website: www.ssst.edu.ba

University rankings

Regional – Overall
- QS Emerging Europe and Central Asia: 176 (2022)

The Sarajevo School of Science and Technology (SSST) is a private university, located in the metropolitan area of Sarajevo, Bosnia and Herzegovina, within the municipality of Ilidža. The university was established by politician and academic Ejup Ganić. Alongside the International University of Sarajevo and the International Burch University, SSST is regarded as the most prestigious private university in the country based on its wealth and rankings.

In partnership with the University of Buckingham, SSST is an English language based university.

== Organization ==
The seven departments into which the university is divided are as follows:

- Department of Computer Science
- Department of Information Systems
- Department of Economics
- Department of Political Science & International Relations
- Department of Engineering Science
- Department of Modern Languages
- Sarajevo Film Academy
  - Film.factory (2013-2017)
- Sarajevo Medical School

== Rankings ==
On 6 June 2018, SSST was ranked as one of the top 600 universities in the world and the best ranked university in Southeast Europe on the QS World University Rankings for 2019. The university was ranked 571st, ahead of the University of Ljubljana, University of Zagreb and University of Belgrade.

== See also ==
- Academic staff of the Sarajevo School of Science and Technology
