= Ilidža =

Ilidža Илиџа
- Town and municipality
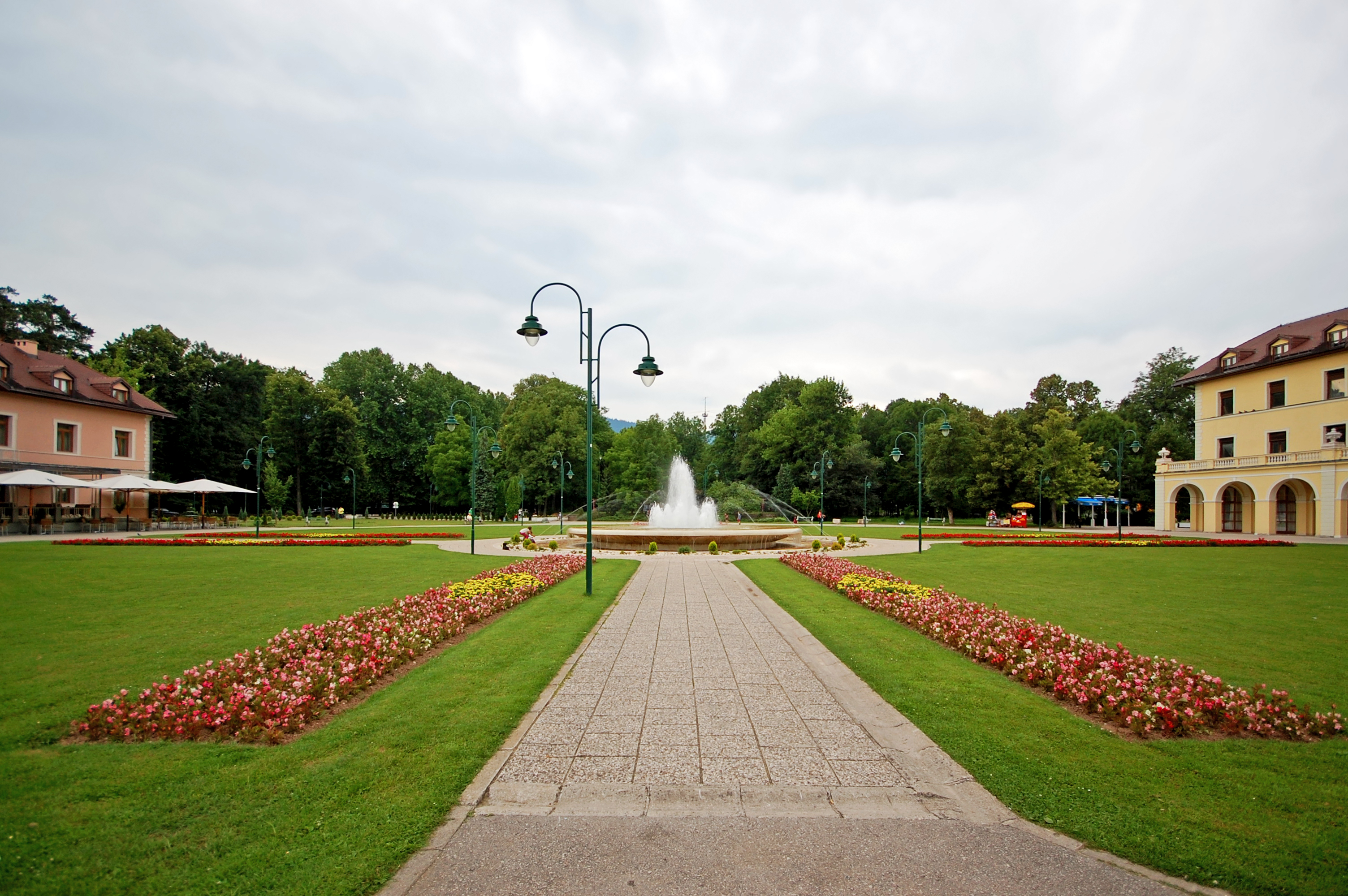
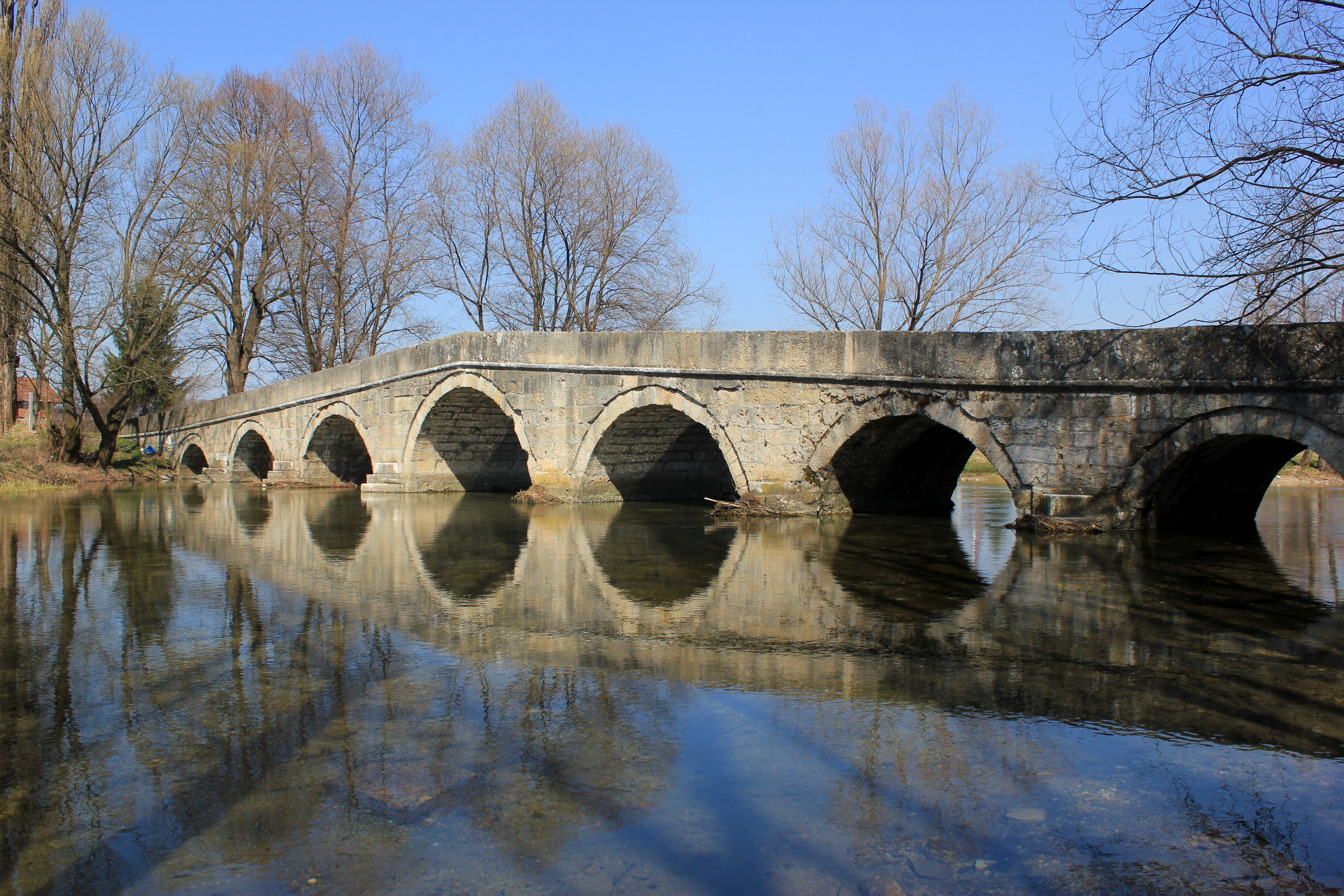
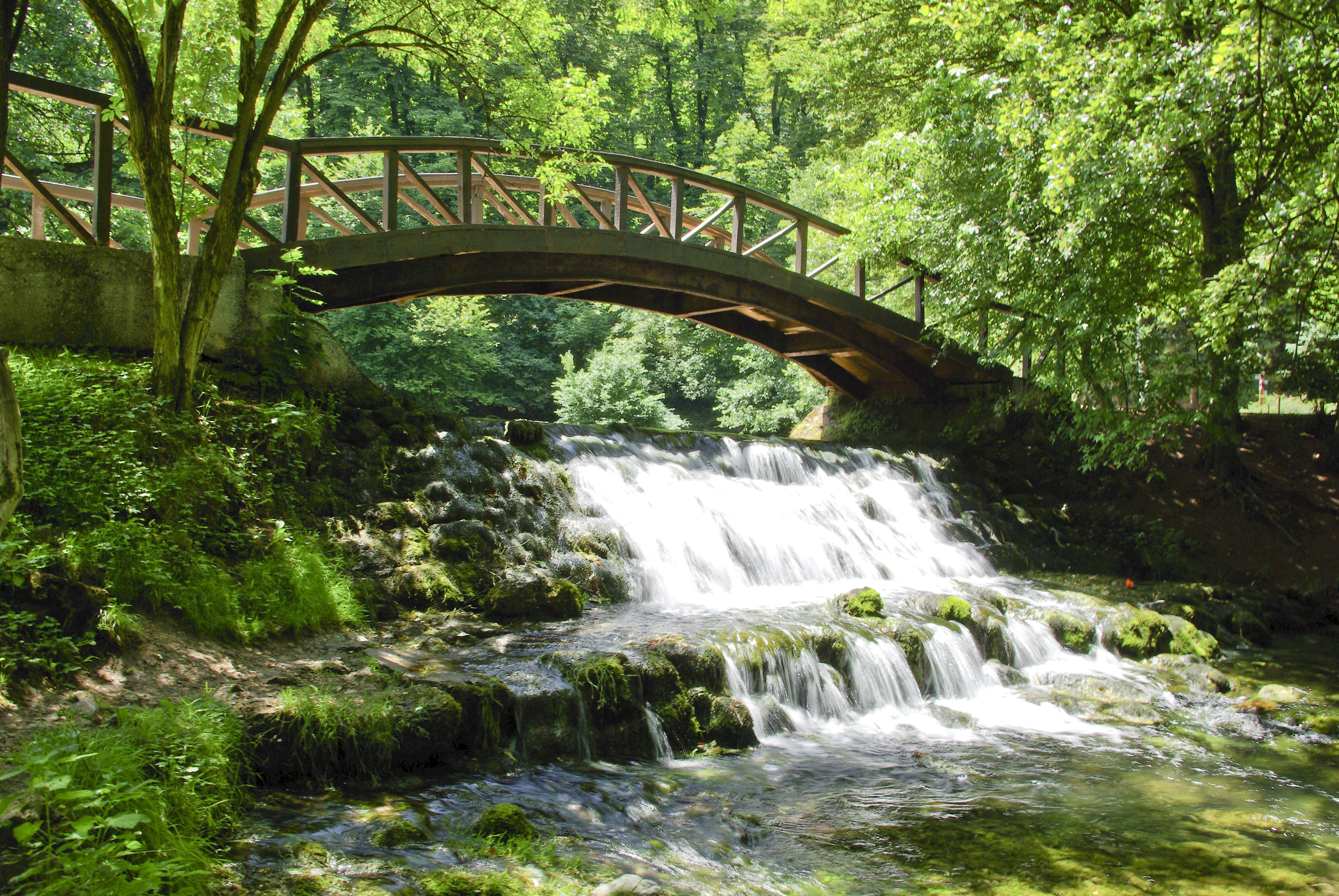
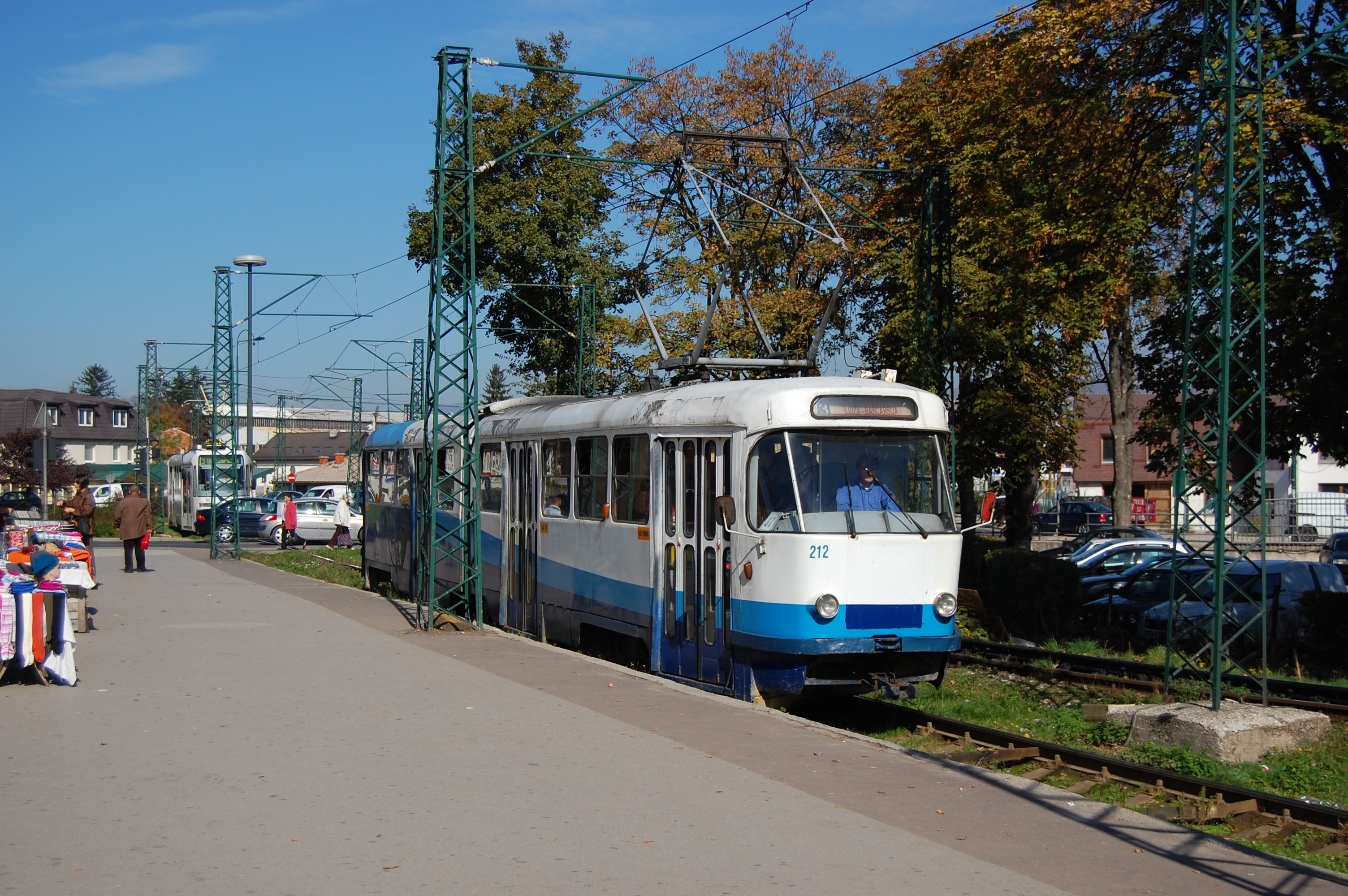
- Banjski Park Roman bridge Vrelo Bosne Old tram in the town center

- Coat of arms

- Location of Ilidža within Bosnia and Herzegovina.
- Interactive map of Ilidža
- Coordinates: 43°49′N 18°18′E
- Country: Bosnia and Herzegovina
- Entity: Federation of Bosnia and Herzegovina
- Canton: Sarajevo Canton

Government
  - Municipal mayor: Nermin Muzur (NiP)

Area
  - Town and municipality: 143.4 km^{2} (55.4 sq mi)

Population (2013)
  - Town and municipality: 66,730
  - Density: 465.3/km^{2} (1,205/sq mi)
  - Urban: 63,528
- Time zone: UTC+1 (CET)
  - Summer (DST): UTC+2 (CEST)
- Area code: +387 33
- Website: www.opcinailidza.ba

Ilidža is a spa town and a municipality located in Sarajevo Canton of the Federation of Bosnia and Herzegovina, an entity of Bosnia and Herzegovina. It has a total population of 66,730 with 63,528 in Ilidža itself, and is a chief suburb of Sarajevo and de facto its neighborhood. It is best known for the Vrelo Bosne spring, as well as the natural environment of its surroundings and historical tradition dating back to Neolithic times. Sarajevo International Airport is located nearby.

== Geography ==
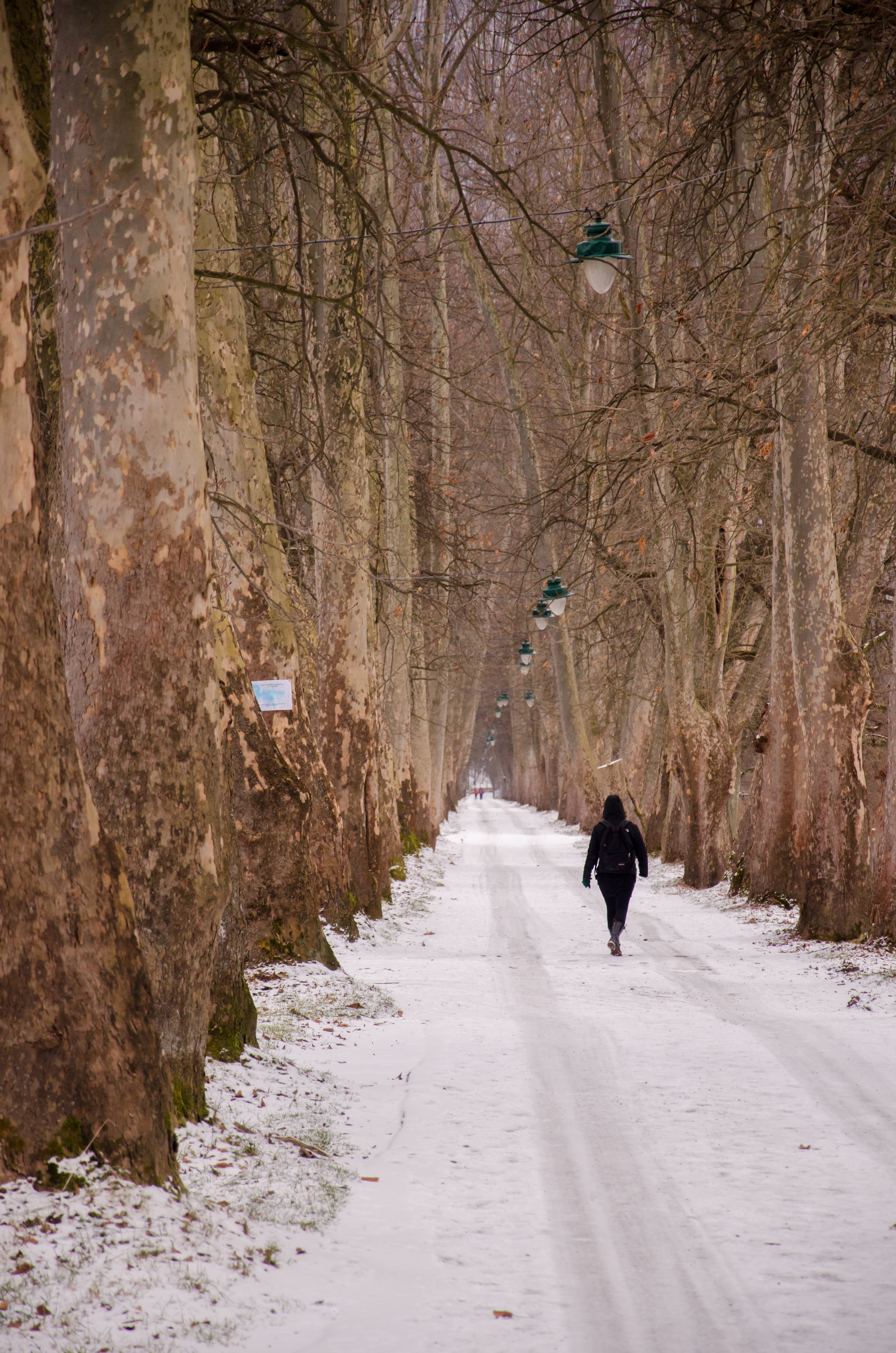
The Great Lane which leads to the Vrelo Bosne spring

Ilidža is known to have a pleasant and attractive geography. The town itself is built on fairly level ground, although it is surrounded by mountains. The highest is Mount Igman, whose 1,502 m (4,928 ft) peak towers above the town. On the mountain grows the "Golden Lily" (Lilium bosniacum), a branch of the Lily family of flowers that is a historical symbol of Bosnia. The area is rich in flint, especially in the Butmir neighborhood.

The Željeznica river, a tributary of the Bosna, passes through the town's center. The Bosna itself passes through Ilidža's outskirts. Its spring, Vrelo Bosne, is found a few kilometers to the west of the town centre and is a national park. A number of smaller streams also pass through the town's area.

A number of horticulture projects have been undertaken in the history of Ilidža. The town is today very rich in trees. The total area of the town's parks is about 50% of that of Sarajevo, which has six times its population. In 1894, an article in a London newspaper called Ilidža "One of the most beautiful places in the world".

=== Climate ===
The climate in this area has mild differences between highs and lows, and there is adequate rainfall year-round. The Köppen climate classification subtype for this climate is "Cfb" (Marine West Coast Climate/Oceanic climate).

Climate data for Ilidža
Month	Jan	Feb	Mar	Apr	May	Jun	Jul	Aug	Sep	Oct	Nov	Dec	Year
Mean daily maximum °C (°F)	2 (35)	5 (41)	10 (50)	15 (59)	20 (68)	23 (73)	26 (78)	26 (78)	23 (73)	16 (60)	8 (46)	3 (37)	14 (57)
Mean daily minimum °C (°F)	−5 (23)	−3 (26)	0 (32)	3 (37)	7 (44)	10 (50)	11 (51)	11 (51)	8 (46)	5 (41)	0 (32)	−3 (26)	3 (37)
Average precipitation mm (inches)	66 (2.6)	61 (2.4)	71 (2.8)	66 (2.6)	81 (3.2)	86 (3.4)	69 (2.7)	69 (2.7)	74 (2.9)	91 (3.6)	84 (3.3)	79 (3.1)	900 (35.3)
Source: Weatherbase

== History ==
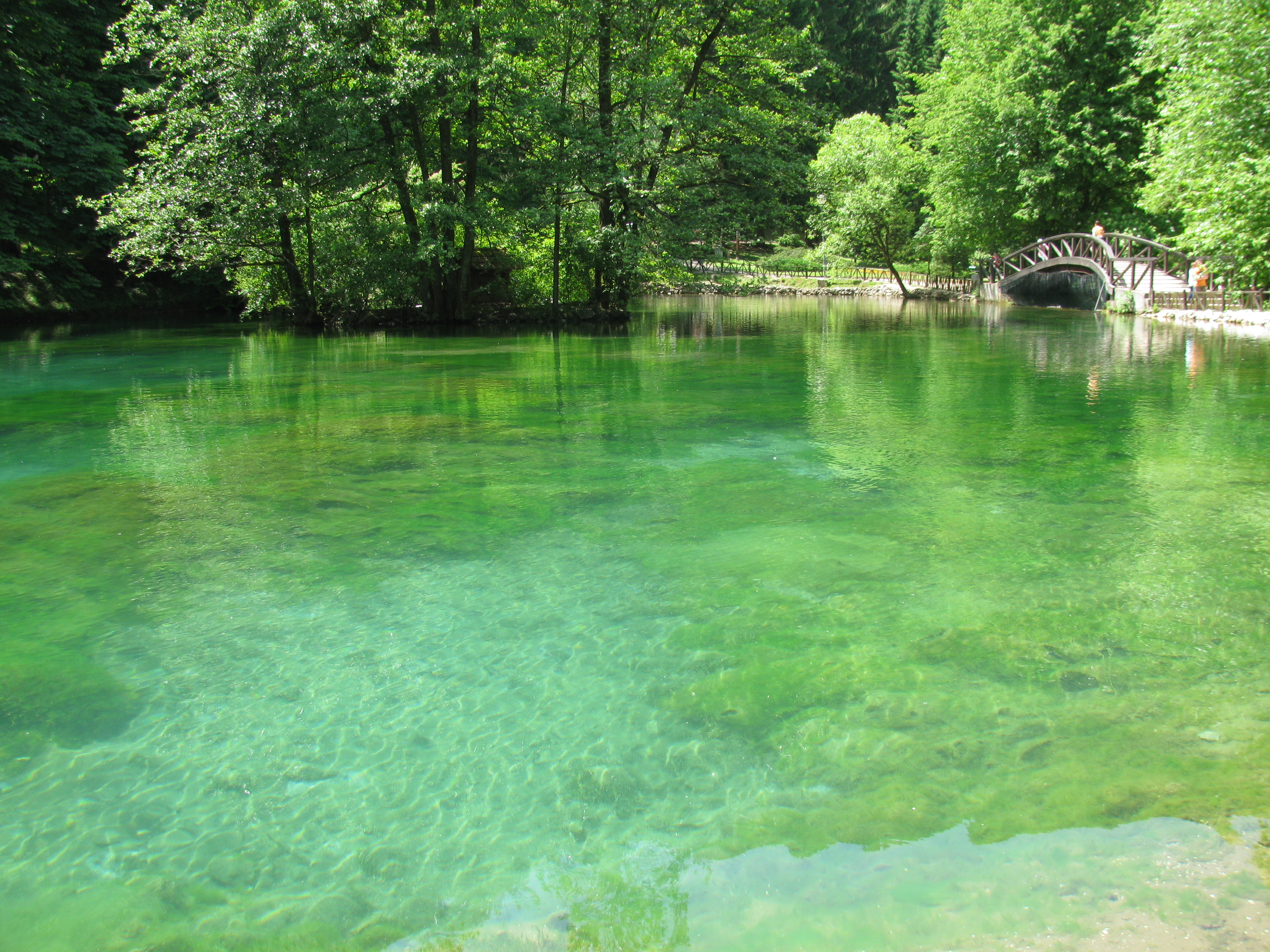
Bosna river, Ilidža

Ilidža is one of the longest continuously inhabited regions in Bosnia and Herzegovina. Since the 19th century, numerous archeological finds have been made in the Butmir area, dating from Neolithic times. The so-called Butmir culture, is one of the best documented Neolithic cultures in Europe of the 26th and 25th centuries BC.

During Roman times, the Ilidža area was the location of the town known as Aquae Sulphurae. This was a Roman colony, and the largest settlement in the whole of Bosnia and Herzegovina at the time. Today numerous traces of Roman civilisation have been found, such as mosaics, ceramics, jewellery, coins, and even structural remains.

During the medieval period, the Ilidža area was part of the Bosnian province of Vrhbosna. Katera, one of the two original Bosnian towns mentioned by Constantine VII in De Administrando Imperio, was found on the ground of today's Ilidža municipality. The disciples of Saints Cyril and Methodius considered the area important enough to stop at Vrelo Bosne and build a church in the area.

The modern town of Ilidža as we know it was founded during the Ottoman rule of Bosnia. Its name derives from the Turkish word Ilıca, meaning "warm thermal springs". Numerous elements of Turkish culture found their way into Ilidža, such as a number of oriental homes from the 15th and 16th centuries that have survived to this day. Numerous mosques and bridges were also built at this time.

Ilidža, like the rest of Bosnia and Herzegovina, experienced industrialisation and westernization with the coming of Austria-Hungary. A railway station and tracks, hotels, and various other structures made Ilidža the most important town after Sarajevo in the region. This continued into the 1900s as Ilidža continued to grow and develop.

Before 1990, Ilidža was populated mainly by Serbs 47,21% and Bosniaks 31,58%. When the Bosnian War started in 1992, until the 1995 Dayton Agreement, the municipality was divided between Bosnian Muslims (Hrasnica, Sokolović Kolonija, Butmir) and Serb (Ilidža, Kotorac, Vojkovići, Grlica) parts. When, under the terms of the Dayton Agreement, Ilidža was placed within the territory of the Bosnian Federation, the vast majority of Serbs fled the town to live in Republika Srpska, destroying some buildings as they did so. In the process, NATO and EU observers reported about violence between those Serbs who decided to leave and ones who wanted to stay, as those who were leaving looted and set on fire not just their but also houses and property of those who were staying as well. From 1996, Ilidža was home to the headquarters of the NATO peacekeeping force IFOR (later SFOR and EUFOR) before its move to nearby Butmir in the year 2000. During this period, the hotels Terme, Srbija (Serbia), Bosna (Bosnia) and Jadran were barricaded and the area was used as NATO HQ. Today Ilidža remains a bustling, largely Bosniak-dominated town. Vojkovići and Grlica formed Eastern Ilidža Municipality which is dominated by Serbs.

== Administration ==
Location of Ilidža Municipality in Bosnia and Herzegovina

=== Administrative division ===
The municipality is administered through sixteen local communities (mjesne zajednice):

- Butmir
- Donji Kotorac
- Sokolović Kolonija
- Hrasnica I
- Hrasnica II
- Ilidža Centar
- Lužani
- Vreoca
- Vrelo Bosne
- Blažuj
- Rakovica
- Osjek
- Otes
- Stup
- Stup II
- Stupsko Brdo

=== Politics ===
Although a fully incorporated suburb of Sarajevo, Ilidža is its own municipality and thus has its own municipal government.

The current political parties are represented in the Municipal Assembly:

- People and Justice – 11 members
- Party of Democratic Action – 10 members
- Social Democratic Party – 4 members
- Our Party – 3 members
- Party for Bosnia and Herzegovina – 2 members
- Democratic Front – 1 member

The current municipal mayor is Nermin Muzur, elected in the 2020 local elections and serving since 23 December 2020.

== Economy ==
Prior to the war, Ilidža municipality was one of the five wealthiest in Bosnia and Herzegovina, and one of the ten wealthiest in the whole of Yugoslavia. The war had a devastating effect on the town's economy, but today it has returned to its pre-war wealth. Several important local companies are based in Ilidža. The town's economy is based on food processing, electronics, and manufacturing.

== Demographics ==
According to the 2013 census, the municipality had a population of 66,730 inhabitants, with 63,528 in Ilidža itself.

=== Settlements ===
The municipality consists of the following settlements with their respective populations:

- Buhotina – 85
- Jasen – 9
- Kakrinje – 411
- Kobiljača – 349
- Krupac – 13
- Rakovica – 1,836
- Rudnik – 377
- Sarajevo Dio - Ilidža – 63,528
- Vela – 7
- Vlakovo – 3
- Zenik – 108
- Zoranovići – 4

=== Ethnic composition ===
Ethnicity	Population (2013 census)	Population (1991 census)	Population (1971 census)
Total	66,730 (100%)	67,937 (100%)	39,452 (100%)
Bosniaks	58,120 (87.1%)	29,337 (43.2%)	12,462 (31.58%)
Croats	3,030 (4.5%)	6934 (10,21%)	6,446 (16.33%)
Serbs	1,600 (2.4%)	25,029 (36.8%)	18,627 (47.21%)
Yugoslavs	0 (0%)	5,181 (7.6%)	954 (2.41%)
Others	3,980 (6%)	1,456 (2.1%)	963 (2.47%)

== Education ==
Ilidža has ten public and two private primary schools, as well as five secondary schools, including one public gymnasium. Three private universities, the International University of Sarajevo, the International Burch University and the Sarajevo School of Science and Technology, are also located in Ilidža. All three are regarded as the most prestigious private universities in Bosnia and Herzegovina based on their wealth and rankings.

== Tourism ==
Sarajevo International Airport is located just a few kilometers from the town. The region's natural environment and historical sites are draws for tourists.

=== Banja Ilidža spa and hotel complex ===
Ilidža with its historic Roman archaeological site consisting of thermae and the village of Aquae Sulphurae, the 19th century hotel complex from Austro-Hungarian period, and a modern bath and spa resort hotel, Banja Terme Ilidža, is a spa town. This, along with a rich natural heritage, makes tourism the most important parts of Ilidža's economy. The natural environment of the area is used to the town's advantage, attracting tourists from both abroad and from neighboring Sarajevo. There are plans for future development to enhance tourism, including hotels and a cable cars line to mount Igman as a destination for skiing and hiking.

Austro-Hungarian architecture (1867–1918)

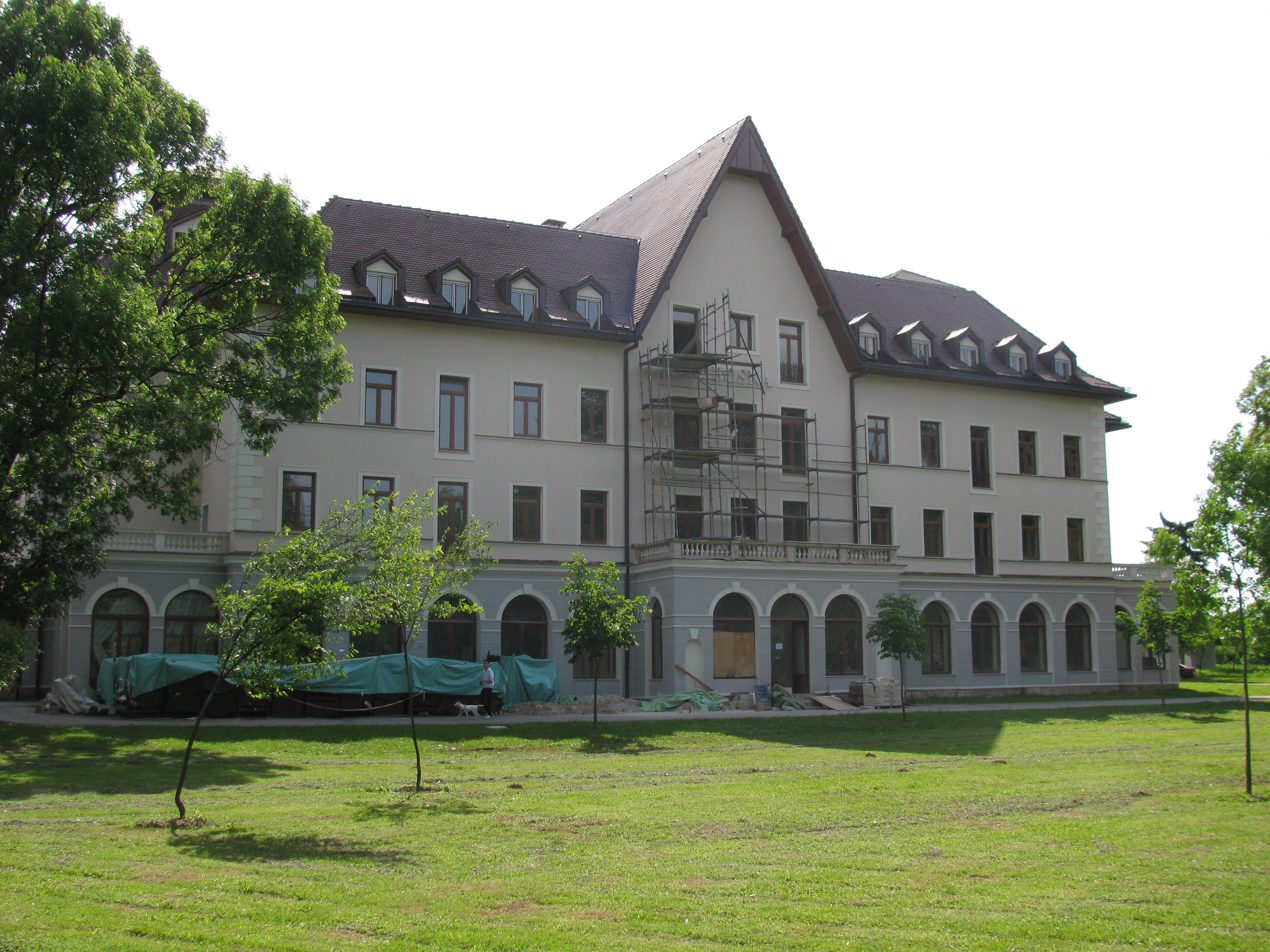
Hotel Bosna

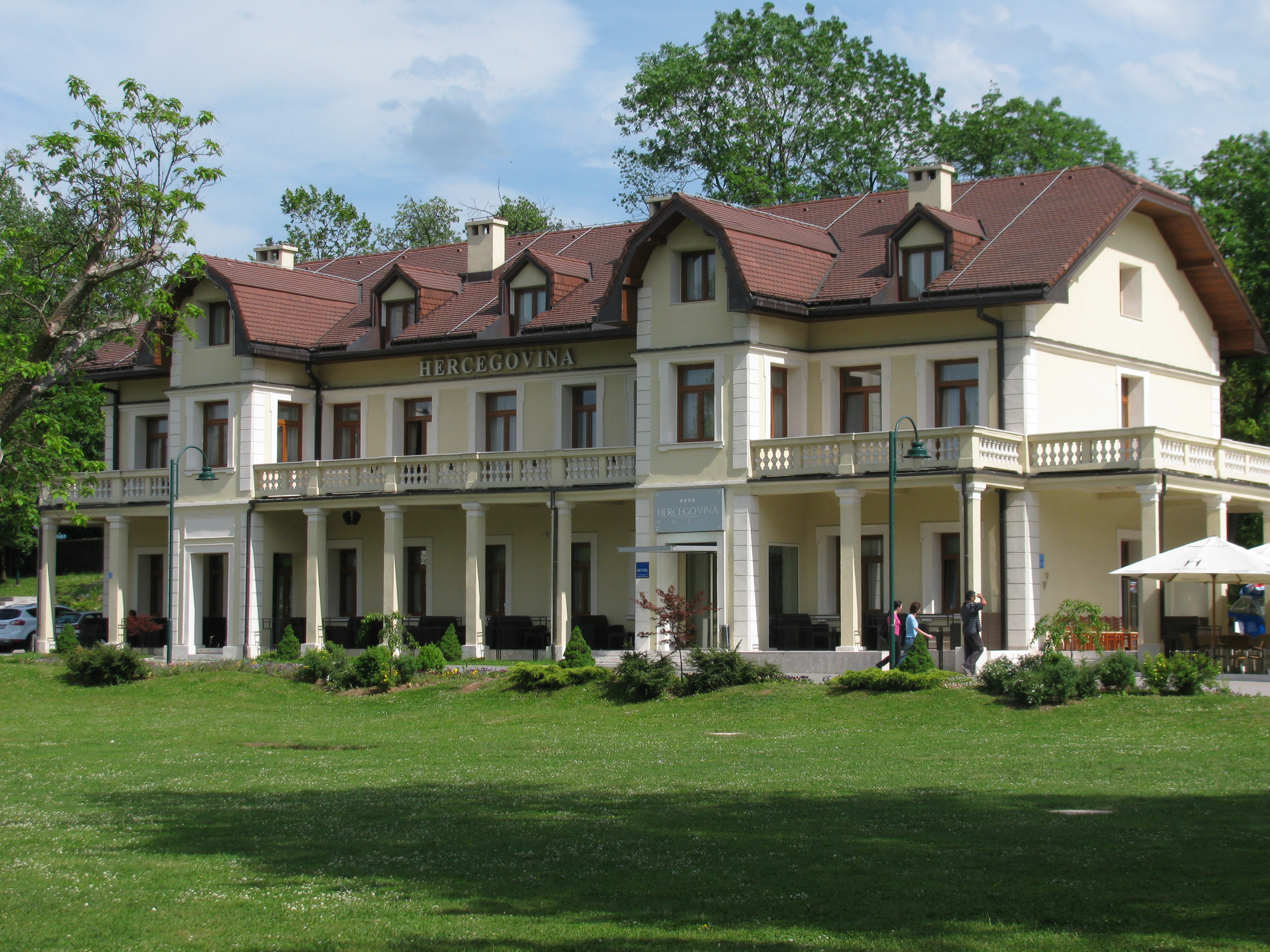
Hotel Hercegovina

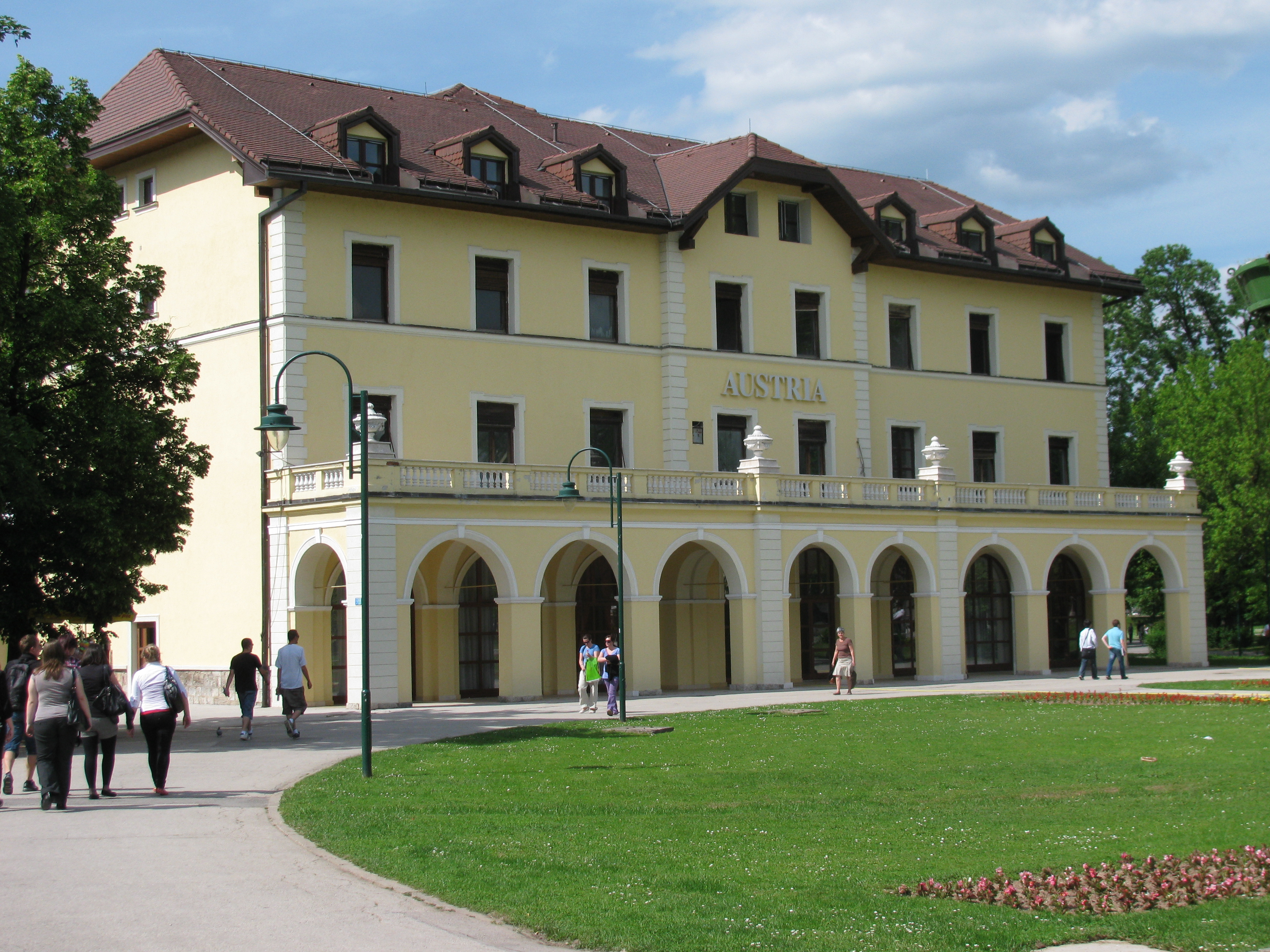
Hotel Austria

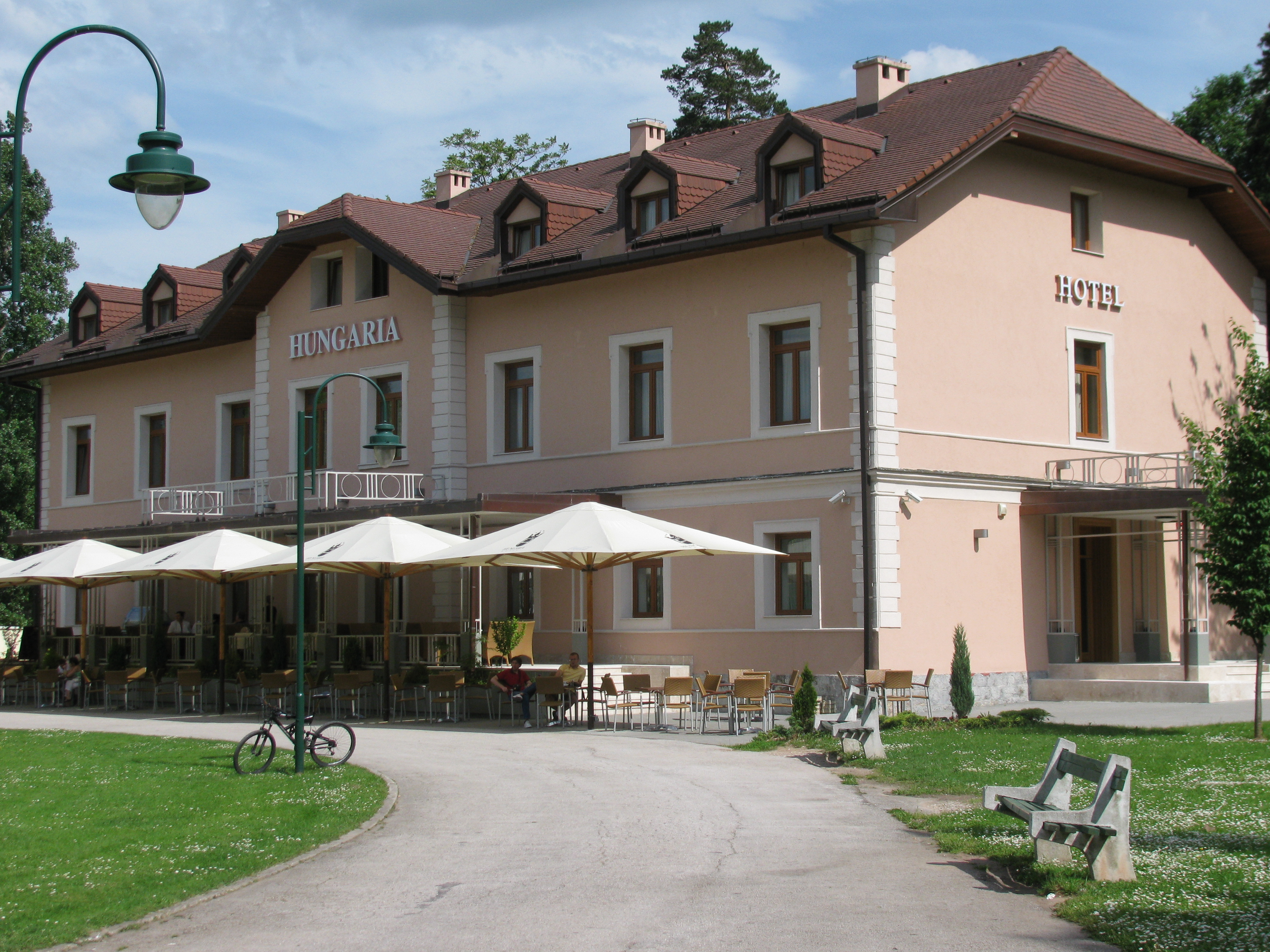
Hotel Crystal (previously called Hotel Hungaria)

=== Vrelo Bosne ===
Vrelo Bosne is one of the country's most popular protected areas. The Rimski Most ("Roman Bridge") over the Bosna river was built in the 16th century using actual Roman stones.

== Twin towns – sister cities ==
Ilidža is twinned with:

- Çekmeköy, Turkey
- İzmit, Turkey
