= Kakrinje =

Kakrinje Какриње
- Village
- Location within Bosnia and Herzegovina
- Coordinates: 43°52′52″N 18°13′32″E
- Country: Bosnia and Herzegovina
- Entity: Federation of Bosnia and Herzegovina
- Canton: Sarajevo
- Municipality: Ilidža

Area
  - Total: 1.11 sq mi (2.87 km^{2})

Population (2013)
  - Total: 411
  - Density: 371/sq mi (143/km^{2})
- Time zone: UTC+1 (CET)
  - Summer (DST): UTC+2 (CEST)

Kakrinje (Serbian Cyrillic: Какриње) is a village in Bosnia and Herzegovina. According to the 1991 census, the village is located in the municipality of Ilidža.

== Demographics ==
According to the 2013 census, its population was 411.

Ethnicity in 2013
Ethnicity	Number	Percentage
Bosniaks	393	95.6%
Serbs	8	1.9%
Croats	1	0.2%
other/undeclared	9	2.2%
Total	411	100%
