= Roman bridge in Ilidža =

Bridge in Ilidža, Bosnia and Herzegovina

Coordinates: 43.8316°N 18.2861°E

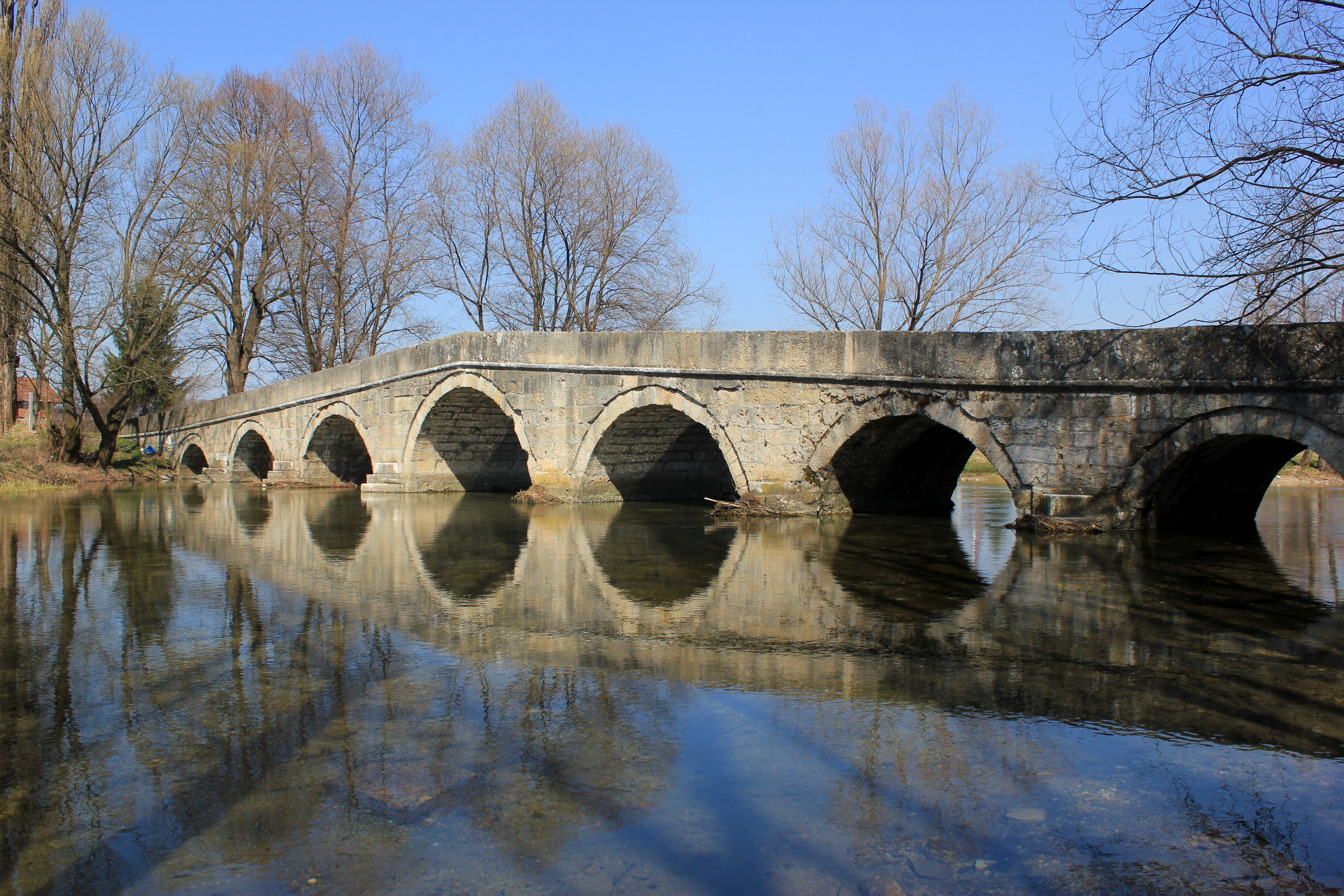
Roman bridge

The Roman Bridge (Bosnian, Croatian and Serbian: Rimski Most / Римски мост) is a bridge in Ilidža, a chief suburb of Sarajevo, the capital of Bosnia and Herzegovina.

It was built in the 16th century using actual Roman stones and crosses the Bosna river.

The Roman Bridge is not far from Vrelo Bosne on the Bosna river in the Ilidža municipality. It was constructed sometime between 1530 and 1550 from the original Roman stones and ruins of the bridge that stood there during the Roman period. The bridge connected the Romans with the village of Aquae Sulphurae at the time.

Ilidža is also known to have been an archaeological site dating from 2400–2000BC.
