= International Burch University =

Private university in Ilidža, Bosnia and Herzegovina

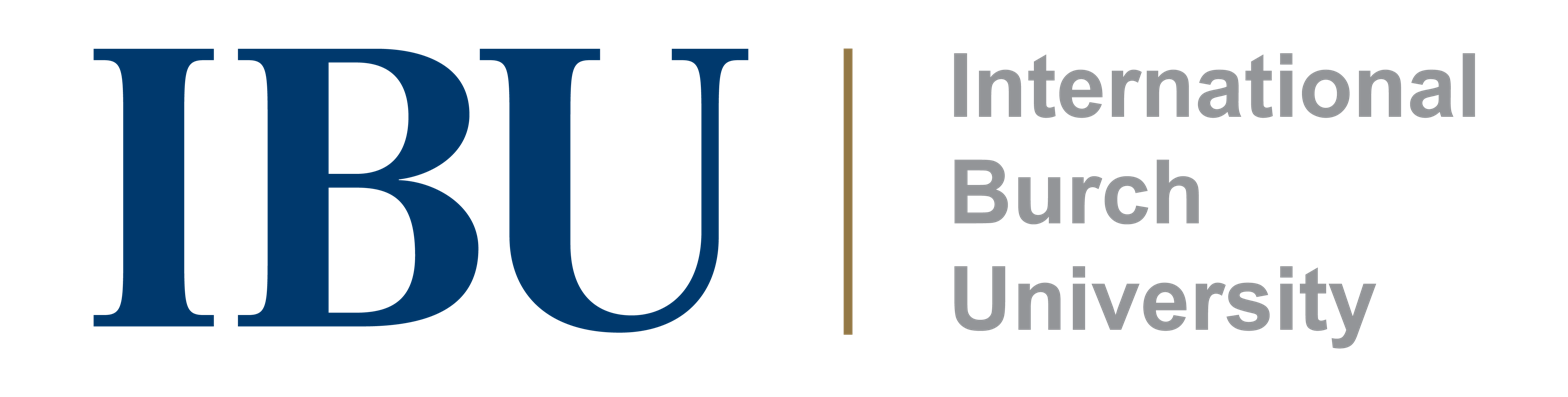
International Burch University (Sarajevo)

The International Burch University (Bosnian: Međunarodni univerzitet Burch, acronym Burch or IBU) is a private university established in 2008 in the metropolitan area of Sarajevo, Bosnia and Herzegovina, within the municipality of Ilidža. Alongside the International University of Sarajevo and the Sarajevo School of Science and Technology, Burch is regarded as the most prestigious private university in the country based on its wealth and rankings.

Officially accredited and/or recognized by the Ministry of Education, Science and Youth of Sarajevo Canton, the university is a small coeducational higher education institution.
