= Buhotina =

Buhotina Бухотина
- Village
- Location within Bosnia and Herzegovina
- Coordinates: 43°53′41″N 18°10′30″E
- Country: Bosnia and Herzegovina
- Entity: Federation of Bosnia and Herzegovina
- Canton: Sarajevo
- Municipality: Ilidža

Area
  - Total: 1.17 sq mi (3.04 km^{2})

Population (2013)
  - Total: 85
  - Density: 72/sq mi (28/km^{2})
- Time zone: UTC+1 (CET)
  - Summer (DST): UTC+2 (CEST)

Buhotina (Serbian Cyrillic: Бухотина) is a village in Bosnia and Herzegovina. According to the 1991 census, the village is located in the municipality of Ilidža.

== Demographics ==
According to the 2013 census, its population was 85.

Ethnicity in 2013
Ethnicity	Number	Percentage
Bosniaks	61	71.8%
Serbs	13	15.3%
Croats	5	5.9%
other/undeclared	6	7.1%
Total	85	100%
