= Rudnik (Ilidža) =

- Village
- Location within Bosnia and Herzegovina
- Coordinates: 43°52′24″N 18°10′59″E
- Country: Bosnia and Herzegovina
- Entity: Federation of Bosnia and Herzegovina
- Canton: Sarajevo
- Municipality: Ilidža

Area
  - Total: 1.53 sq mi (3.96 km^{2})

Population (2013)
  - Total: 377
  - Density: 247/sq mi (95.2/km^{2})
- Time zone: UTC+1 (CET)
  - Summer (DST): UTC+2 (CEST)

Rudnik is a village in Bosnia and Herzegovina. According to the 1991 census, the village is located in the municipality of Ilidža.

== Demographics ==
According to the 2013 census, its population was 377.

Ethnicity in 2013
| Ethnicity | Number | Percentage |
|---|---|---|
| Bosniaks | 333 | 88.3% |
| Serbs | 10 | 2.7% |
| Croats | 7 | 1.9% |
| other/undeclared | 27 | 7.2% |
| Total | 377 | 100% |
