= Rakovica, Ilidža =

Rakovica
- Village
- Interactive map of Rakovica
- Location within Bosnia and Herzegovina
- Coordinates: 43°52′40″N 18°12′23″E
- Country: Bosnia and Herzegovina
- Entity: Federation of Bosnia and Herzegovina
- Canton: Sarajevo
- Municipality: Ilidža

Area
  - Total: 2.95 sq mi (7.65 km^{2})

Population (2013)
  - Total: 1,836
  - Density: 622/sq mi (240/km^{2})
- Time zone: UTC+1 (CET)
  - Summer (DST): UTC+2 (CEST)

Rakovica is a village in central-eastern Bosnia and Herzegovina, west of Ilidža and Sarajevo, in the municipality of Ilidža.

Ernst von Mansfeld, a mercenary general of the Thirty Years' War, died at Rakovica in 1626, while trying to reach Venice.

== Demographics ==
According to the 2013 census, its population was 1,836.

Ethnicity in 2013
Ethnicity	Number	Percentage
Bosniaks	1,730	94.2%
Croats	43	2.3%
Serbs	14	0.8%
other/undeclared	49	2.7%
Total	1,836	100%
