= International University of Sarajevo =

Private university in Ilidža, Bosnia and Herzegovina

- Motto: Be Among the Best, be IUS
- Type: Private
- Established: 2004
- Founder: Foundation for Education Development Sarajevo
- Rector: Prof. Dr. Ali Osman Kuşakcı
- Location: (Bosnia and Herzegovina) Sarajevo, Bosnia and Herzegovina
- Campus: Urban
- Language: English
- Colors: Blue and White
- Website: www.ius.edu.ba

The International University of Sarajevo (IUS) is a private university located in the metropolitan area of Sarajevo, Bosnia and Herzegovina, within the municipality of Ilidža. The university was established by the Foundation for the Development of Education in 2004–2005. IUS is regarded as the most prestigious private university in the country based on its rankings.

IUS is open to students from all over the world, and the language of instruction and communication is English. It offers four year education according to Bologna system (model 4+1+3 with B.S. and B.A. diplomas). The university has almost 3,000 students from 45 countries and faculty members from 12 countries performing academic and research activities in various disciplines of Science, Engineering, Medicine, Arts and Social Sciences. The first generation of 32 IUS graduates received their diplomas on 26 June 2009. IUS offers many types of scholarships, especially for students from Bosnia and Herzegovina.

Within the Double Diploma Program (DDP), International University of Sarajevo (IUS) has established partnerships with four Turkish universities: Istanbul University, Marmara University, Istanbul Technical University and University of Health Sciences.

== History ==
The International University of Sarajevo (IUS) was founded in 2003 as one of the largest educational initiatives in the Balkan region. IUS accepts both local and international students across all three cycles of study, while being among the first higher education institutions in Bosnia and Herzegovina to adopt European standards in teaching and learning.

Today, IUS offers 21 bachelor programs, 21 master programs, and 10 doctoral programs within six faculties.

Beyond teaching, IUS is committed to fostering student achievement, strengthening its presence in the international academic arena, and building long-term cooperation with partner universities through projects and joint initiatives.

== Campus ==
The university is located on a single campus at Hrasnička cesta 15 in Hrasnica, Ilidža, in the suburbs of Sarajevo. The new campus was officially opened on 5 April 2010 by Haris Silajdžić, then Chairman of the Presidency of Bosnia and Herzegovina, and Recep Tayyip Erdoğan, then Prime Minister of Turkey.

Teaching and administration are housed in two main buildings, A and B, with the university library located in Building B. The campus also includes a Research and Development Center, a canteen, a café, a mosque, a stadium, and a basketball court.

Two student dormitories operate on campus. The Plavi Leptir dormitory for male students opened in the 2009/2010 academic year and is run by the Turkish İlim Yayma Cemiyeti. The Mehmet Çakır dormitory for female students covers 3,860 m² and has 206 beds.
