= Zujevina =

River in Bosnia and Herzegovina

Location
- State: Bosnia and Herzegovina
- Municipality: Hadžići

Physical characteristics
- Source: Kradenik creek
  - location: Bjelašnica
- 2nd source: Resnik creek
  - location: Resnik village, Pazarić
  - coordinates: 43°47′17.95″N 18°9′3.31″E
- Mouth: Bosna
  - location: Sastavci
  - coordinates: 43°50′39″N 18°17′02″E
  - elevation: 450 m (1,480 ft)

Basin features
- Progression: Zujevina Bosna Sava Danube Black Sea
- River system: Black Sea
- Cities: Hadžiči, Ilidža
- Tributaries
  - left: Ljubovčica, Krupa i Žunovnica
  - right: Pazarićki potok, Vihrica i Rakovica

The Zujevina is a river in Bosnia and Herzegovina. It is a left tributary of the Bosna.

== Geography and hydrography ==
The Zujevina River is the largest river in the Bosnian municipality of Hadžići. It is formed by the joining of the Kradenik stream, which springs from the northwestern slopes of Bjelašnica, and the Resnik stream, running through Resnik village near Pazarić. This is a mountain river that often overflows its banks during snow melting season in spring.

The right tributaries of the Zujevina are Ljubovčica, Krupa and Žunovnica, and the left tributaries are Pazarićki potok, Vihrica and Rakovica (river). It flows into the Bosna River in the municipality of Ilidža, at the location of Sastavci, where the Željeznica and Mala Bosna meet and create the river Bosna, and where the Dobrinja and Miljacka also flow into the Bosna. Because of this, the area is rich in water and almost always exposed to flooding during rainy periods and snow-melting season.

== Angling ==
The local angling organization from Hadžići regularly cleans the rivers under their care, the Zujevina, Tarčinka, as well as these rivers' immediate vicinities, of waste and garbage, and also regularly stock them with fish, specifically with brown trout. Taking care for the rivers is a constant task for this association, both for the fish protection service, as well as other fishermen and locals. The entire area is marked with boards with information and fishing rules.
