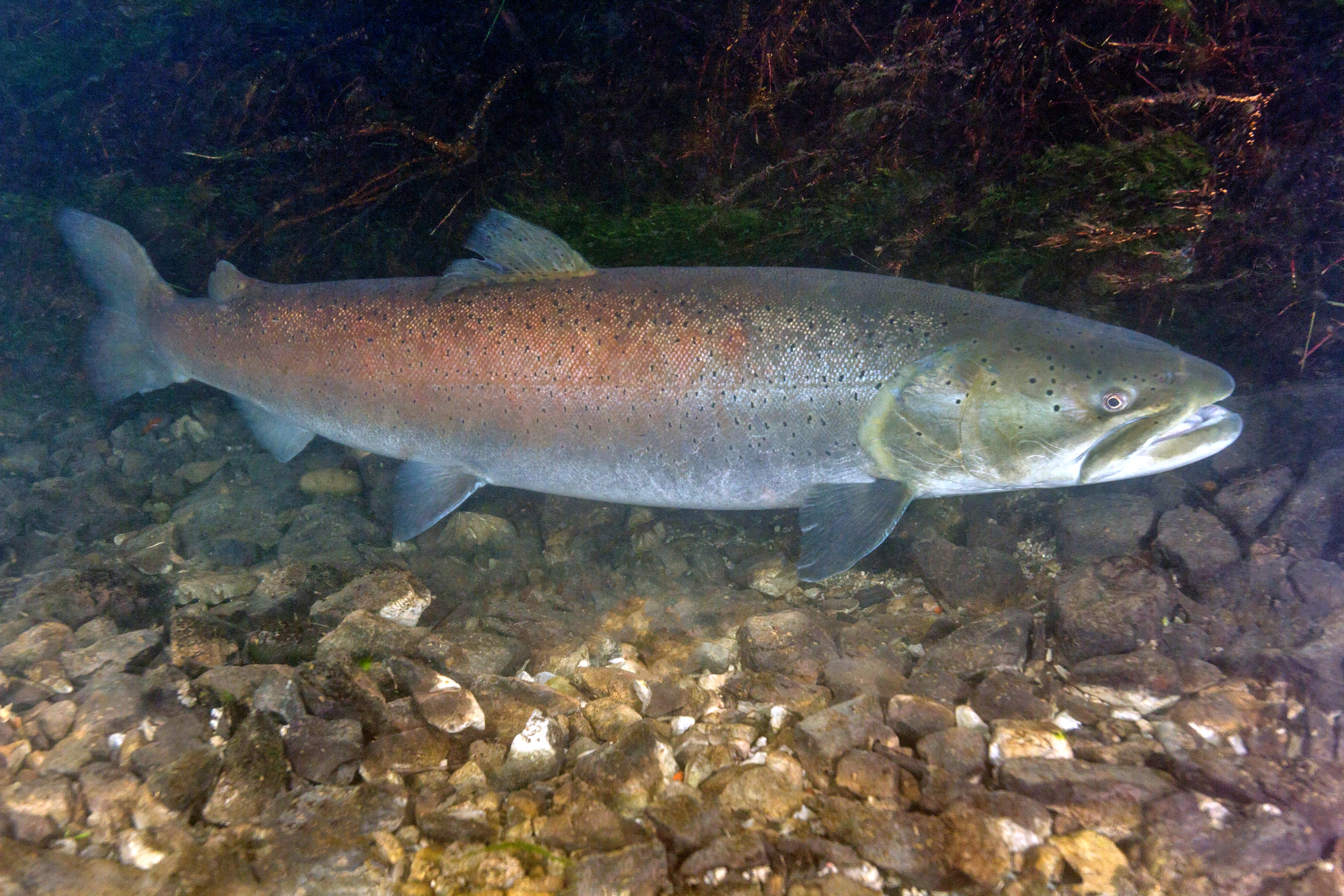

Conservation status
- Endangered (IUCN 3.1)

Scientific classification
- Kingdom: Animalia
- Phylum: Chordata
- Class: Actinopterygii
- Division: Teleostei
- Order: Salmoniformes
- Family: Salmonidae
- Genus: Hucho
- Species: H. hucho

Binomial name
- Hucho hucho (Linnaeus, 1758)

Synonyms
- Salmo hucho Linnaeus, 1758; Hucho germanorum Günther, 1866

= Huchen =

Species of fish

The huchen (Hucho hucho) (/ˈhuːxən/, from German), also known as Danube salmon or redfish (German: Rotfisch), is a large species of freshwater fish in the family Salmonidae native to the Danube basin in Central and Eastern Europe. It is the type species of genus Hucho (a.k.a. the taimens), being closely related (in the same subfamily) to salmon, trout, char and lenoks.

== Distribution ==
The huchen is endemic to the Danube basin in Europe where the remaining population is threatened primarily by river damming, resulting in habitat fragmentation and loss through river impoundment and disruption of the longitudinal continuity of rivers, cutting away fish from its spawning grounds, with overfishing and fisheries mismanagement as an additional issue in many areas. Damming and all these other problems are especially visible in the Balkans.

The upper reaches of the Danube basin, rivers and tributaries contain almost all of the recent population. This includes:

- In Austria: the Inn river, the Traun river, the upper Drava, with the lower Gail in Carinthia, the Pielach, in Styria the upper Mur.
- In Germany: middle and lower Inn, Isar (especially in Munich)

In the Balkans huchen still appears in following river systems:

- In Slovenia: in the headwaters of Sava and its tributaries.
- In Croatia: in the upper and middle course of Kupa.
- In Bosnia and Herzegovina: in the upper and middle Una, with the upper and middle Sana; the upper and middle Vrbas, with the lower and middle Vrbanja; the main channel of the Bosna lost its population due to degradation of its waters, its banks and riverbed, but its four main tributaries, the Krivaja, the Fojnička, the Lašva and the Željeznica, are still important habitats; one of the most important huchen habitats in the Balkans and Europe is the Drina, with its numerous tributaries, especially the Lim, the Tara and the Ćehotina, and smaller ones, the Bistrica, the Prača, and the Drinjača;
- In Serbia: the Lim.
- In Montenegro: the Lim, with the Lake Plav, the Ćehotina, and the Tara.

Some of these habitats, especially in the Balkans, are endangered with planned, or already implemented plans for construction of new dams and hydroelectric power plants, such as on the Lim in Serbia, or like in case of the river Piva in Montenegro and Bosnia and Herzegovina, whose respective populations were completely wiped out since mid 20th century.

In some cases rehabilitation of parts of the habitat is attempted, through restoration of the river course. Such positive example is the part of the course of the river Inn, with some 30 km (19 mi)-long stretch around the Bavarian town of Mühldorf was rebuilt and renaturalized and the huchen has returned in recent years.

It has been introduced to other major river basins elsewhere on the continent and even North Africa, to rivers in Morocco, but these populations are not self-sustaining. Some evidence suggest that in historic times the huchen has also been found in the neighboring Dniester basin. Huchen sometimes successfully establish in accessible natural lakes, like glacial Lake Plav which is the source of the Lim river in Montenegro, one of the major huchen habitats in the Balkans. However, the species sometimes survives even when cut off from the rest of the population in big dam reservoirs on mountain rivers, such as reservoirs on the Drina in Bosnia, or Lake Czorsztyn in Poland, as long as competitive and/or allochthonous predator species are not introduced into the newly created lakes.

== Ecology ==
=== Appearance ===
The huchen reaches about 1.5 m (4 ft 11 in) in length and more than 50 kg (110 lb) in weight. The average length is between 60 and 120 centimetres (24 and 47 in). The huchen has a slender body that is nearly round in cross-section. On the reddish brown back are several dark patches in an X or crescent shape, but most distinctive feature is its head, which is larger than in other salmonides (longer and wider), with large elongated mouth.

=== Diet ===
As the largest fish found within many European rivers, Huchen like many other salmonoids under an ontogenetic change as they grow older. Smaller fish feed on the larvae of water insects or on insects dropped into the water. As they get older, larger individuals prey on other species of fish and small vertebrates.

Common nase is the most important food source for a Danube salmon (huchen). From a study in Slovakia, older angler caught individuals primarily seemed to prey on spirlin Alburnoides bipunctatus, chub Leuciscus cephalus, brown trout Salmo trutta, and barbel Barbus barbus.

=== Historical occurrence ===
There is no international convention nor single agreed body concerned with verification of records and mandated with the task, however there are many modern and historical records for the largest huchen caught. Among these recorded is a fish weighing 34.8 kg (77 lb), caught in February 1985 in Spittal an der Drau in Austria,; also one weighing 39.4 kg (87 lb), which is stuffed and was kept in a fish-farm in Austria for breeding. Other stories of record specimens with existing photographs and media reports include 58 kg (128 lb), caught in January 1938 by Bosnian railway worker and angler Halil Sofradžija at the Dragojevića Rapids on the Drina river, near the town of Ustikolina in Bosnia and Herzegovina. This case was recorded on photograph and reportage was later published in prime Serbian daily Politika on 23 February 1938. Dževat Šarkinović, an environmental protection advisor caught a Danube salmon illegally with a net weighing 41.3 kg (91 lb), 145 cm (57 in) long, in Lake Plav 1985, and gave it to Hotel "Plavsko jezero" who presented it at International Fair of Hunting and Fishing in Novi Sad where it was noted as a "world record". Today, this specimen stands as stuffed exhibit at the wall of hotel's foyer in Plav. Another recorded trophy from the Drina include huchen caught by angler Remzija Krkalić from Foča in 1940, weighing 36 kg (79 lb).

== Reproduction ==
This permanent freshwater salmonid spawns in April, once water reaches a temperature of 6 to 9 °C (43 to 48 °F). For spawning, the huchen migrates up the river and enters small and shallow affluents, where females excavate depressions in the gravel into which they deposit their eggs, then a male releases a cloud of sperm and the female then covers the eggs with sand. Larvae hatch 30 to 35 days after fertilization.

== Commercial breeding ==
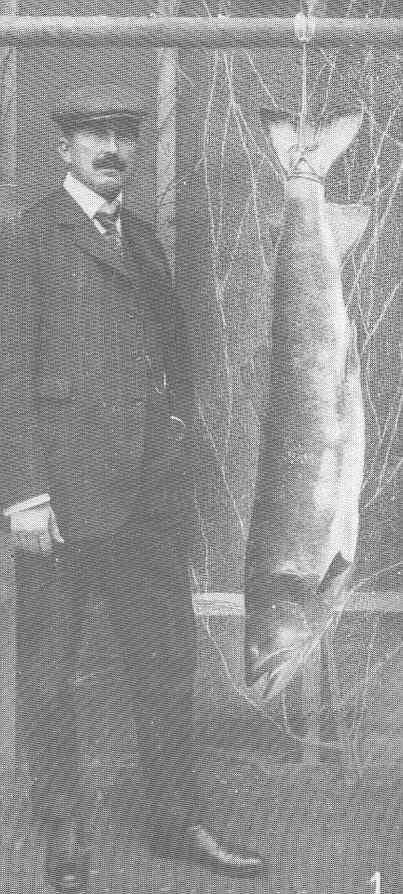
A large Inn River huchen (1913)

There is a considerable effort to produce huchen fry commercially and to reintroduce the species into the wild with moderate to good success. This requires catching the adults just before spawning and keeping them in special tanks. Fry are released in appropriate places once they have reached 4 to 10 cm (1.6 to 3.9 in).
