= Rastelica =

Rastelica may refer to:

- Rastelica, Serbia, a village in Kuršumlija
- Donja Raštelica, a village in Bosnia and Herzegovina
- Gornja Raštelica, a village in Bosnia and Herzegovina

== See also ==
- Restelica, Serbian name of Restelicë, a village in Kosovo
