= Mala Bosna (river) =

River in Bosnia and Herzegovina

Mala Bosna Little Bosna
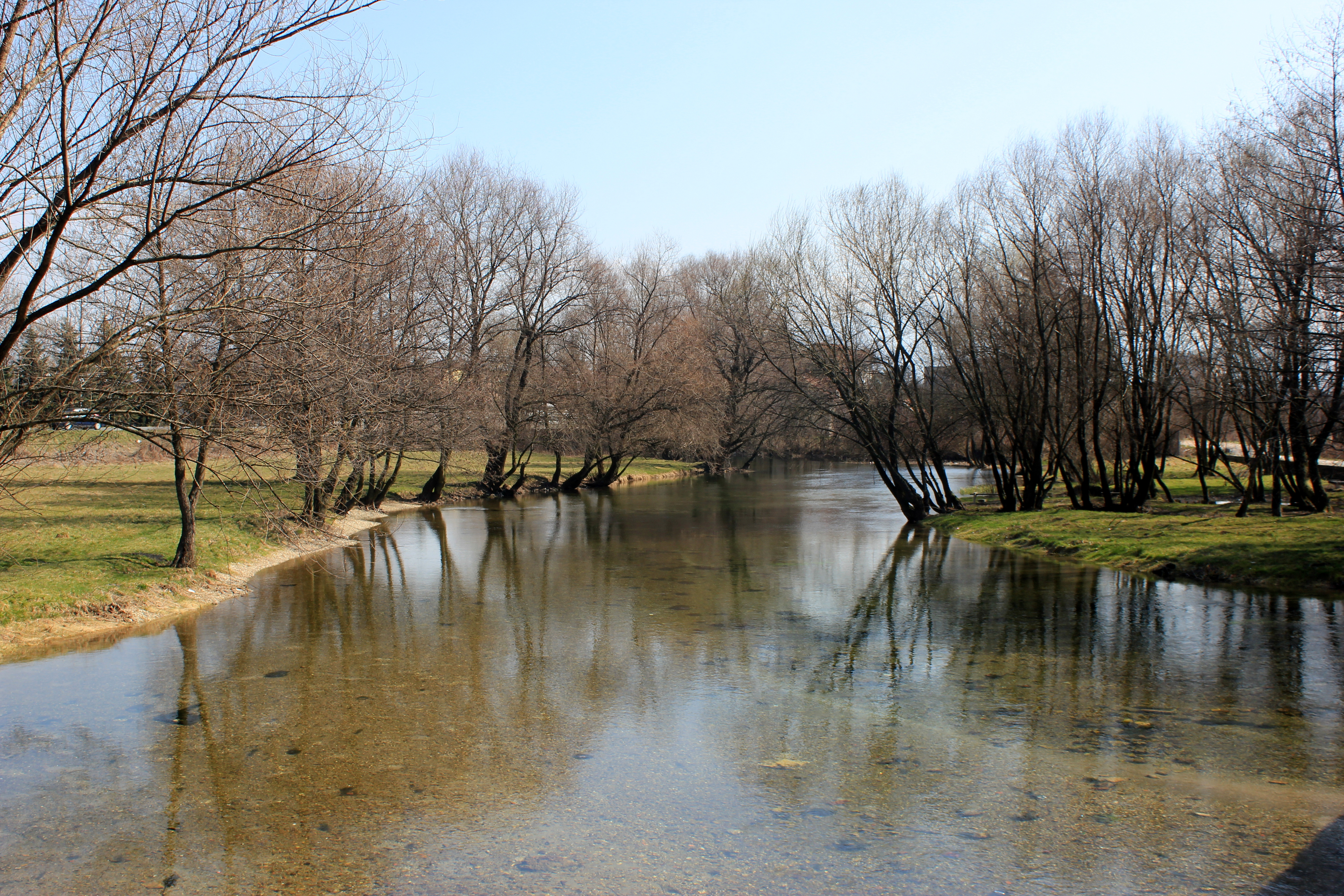
- The Mala Bosna river flowing through Sarajevsko Polje

- Location within Bosnia and Herzegovina

Location
- Country: Bosnia and Herzegovina

Physical characteristics
- Source: Vrelo Bosne
  - location: Igman, Ilidža, Bosnia and Herzegovina
  - coordinates: 43.819087008779974°N 18.267629784148387°E
  - elevation: 520 m (1,710 ft); (494.5 m (1,622 ft) a.s.l. according to an earlier source)
- Mouth: Sastavci confluence with the Željeznica river
  - location: Osjek (Ilidža), Bosnia and Herzegovina
  - coordinates: 43.83935559520562°N 18.286950276020754°E
  - elevation: approx. 510 m (1,670 ft)
- Length: 3.6 km (2.2 mi)

Basin features
- Progression: Bosna→ Sava→ Danube→ Black Sea
- Tributaries
  - right: Večerica

The Mala Bosna river (transl. Little Bosna) is the river that runs through municipality of Ilidža at the outskirts of Sarajevo, Bosnia and Herzegovina. The Mala Bosna is a headwater course of the Bosna river. Its course is approximately 4 kilometers long and stretches between its source, Vrelo Bosne, and a confluence with its largest tributary in this section, the Željeznica.

== Hydrology and sectioning ==
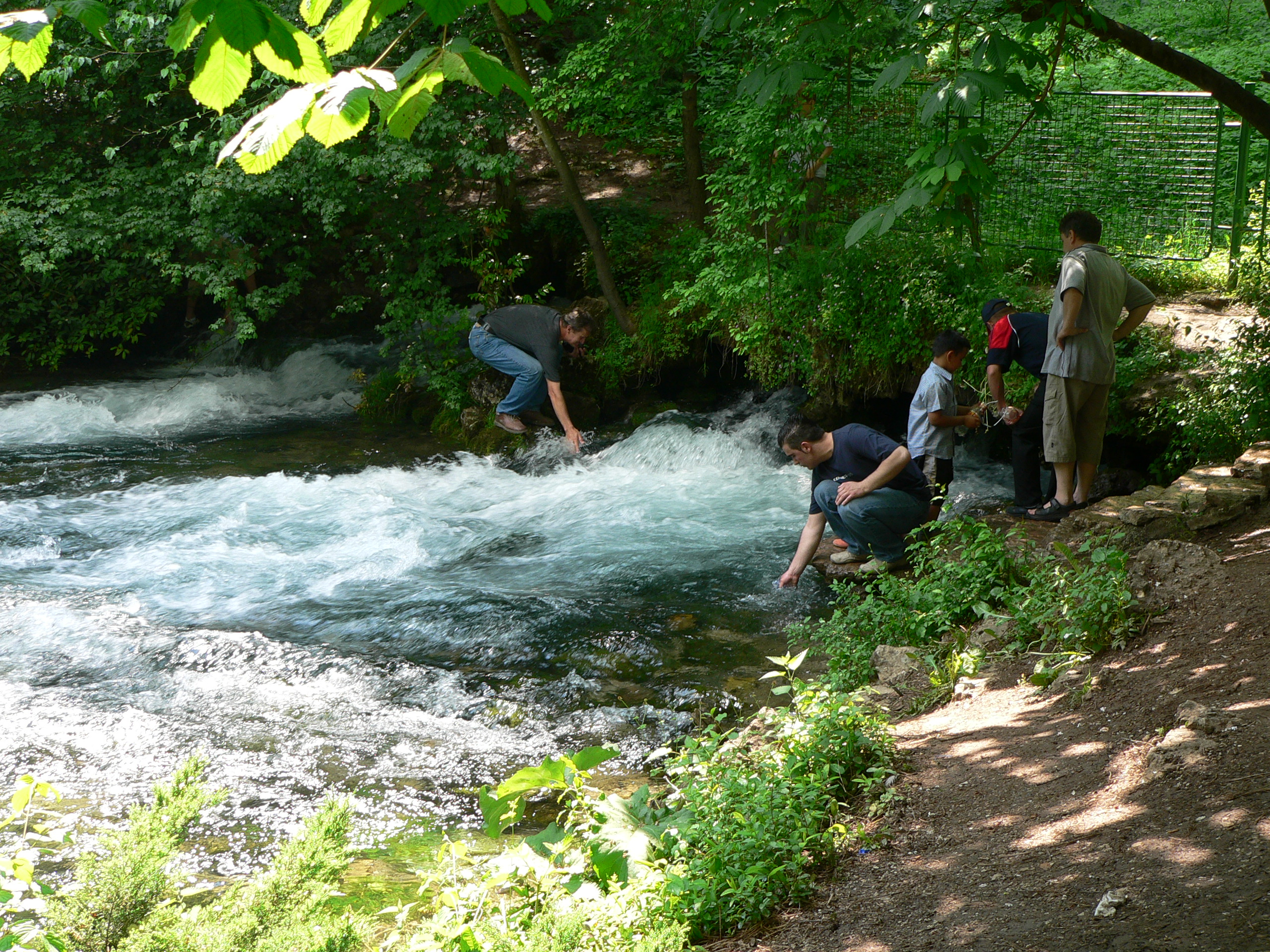
The main spring on the source of the Bosna river, on the outskirts of Sarajevo.

In terms of sectioning this whole area is the Upper Bosna, which is usually hydrologically regarded as a section between the river's source, Vrelo Bosne, and the mouth of the Lašva river, one of the major left tributaries, just upstream from Zenica. The section encompasses the entire region between Ilidža, near Sarajevo, and the Lašva, including the spacious valley between Ilijaš and Kakanj, with the Visoko region with its rich medieval heritage at the center of this area.

=== Vrelo Bosne springs ===
The Mala Bosna (or Bosna) source is the Vrelo Bosne spring, located at 520 m (1,710 ft) a.s.l. (according to an earlier source, 494.5 m (1,622 ft) a.s.l.) at the foothills of mount Igman, on the outskirts of Sarajevo, capital of Bosnia and Herzegovina. The spring is one of Bosnia and Herzegovina's chief natural landmarks and tourist attractions.

=== Course ===
The course of the river Bosna between its source and its largest tributary in this section, the Željeznica, which runs in from the right, has been referred as the Mala Bosna (transl. Little Bosna) throughout history, by locals and researchers alike, but the section is often extended all the way to its confluence with Miljacka, which also runs from the right some four kilometers downstream from Sastavci confluence with Željeznica.

The Mala Bosna course is approximately 4 kilometers long and stretches between its source, Vrelo Bosne and a confluence with the Željeznica. The confluence of two rivers is locally known as Sastavci (transl. confluence). After two rivers merge at the Sastavci the course becomes simply known as the Bosna River.

=== Tributaries ===
The Mala Bosna tributaries in the area before Sastavci confluence with the Željeznica, are the Večerica and Bukulaš, both fed by the strong well-springs of the Stojčevac. In the area of extended Mala Bosna course (course after Sastavci, between the Željeznica and Miljacka), it further receives first the Željeznica from the right, then approx. 600 meters downstream the Zujevina, the only tributary from the left in this region, followed by the Dobrinja (a.k.a. Tilava) 1.5 km below, and then 2 km further downstream the Miljacka, both from the right.

== Gallery ==
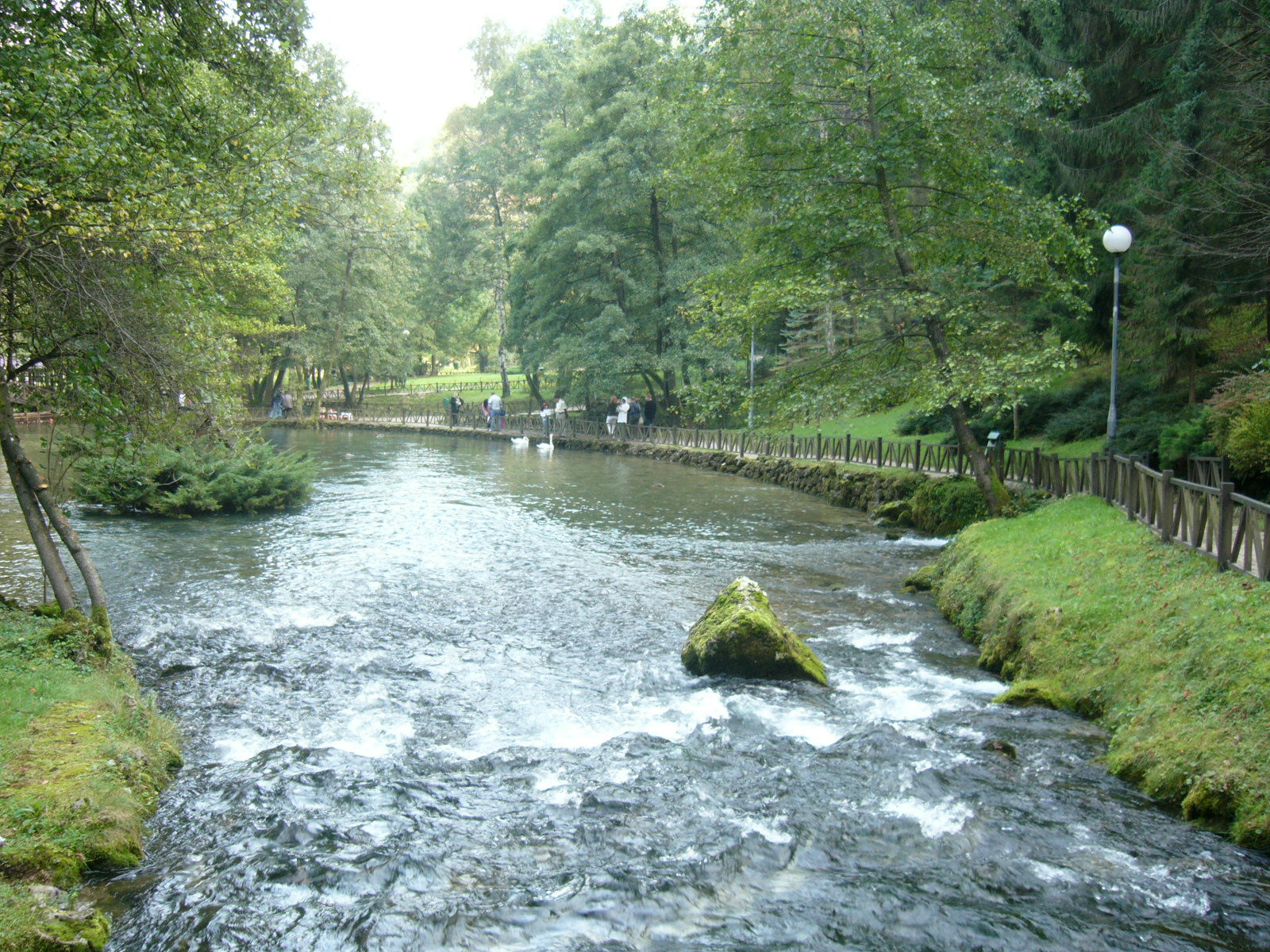
Vrelo Bosne, source of the river just outside Sarajevo

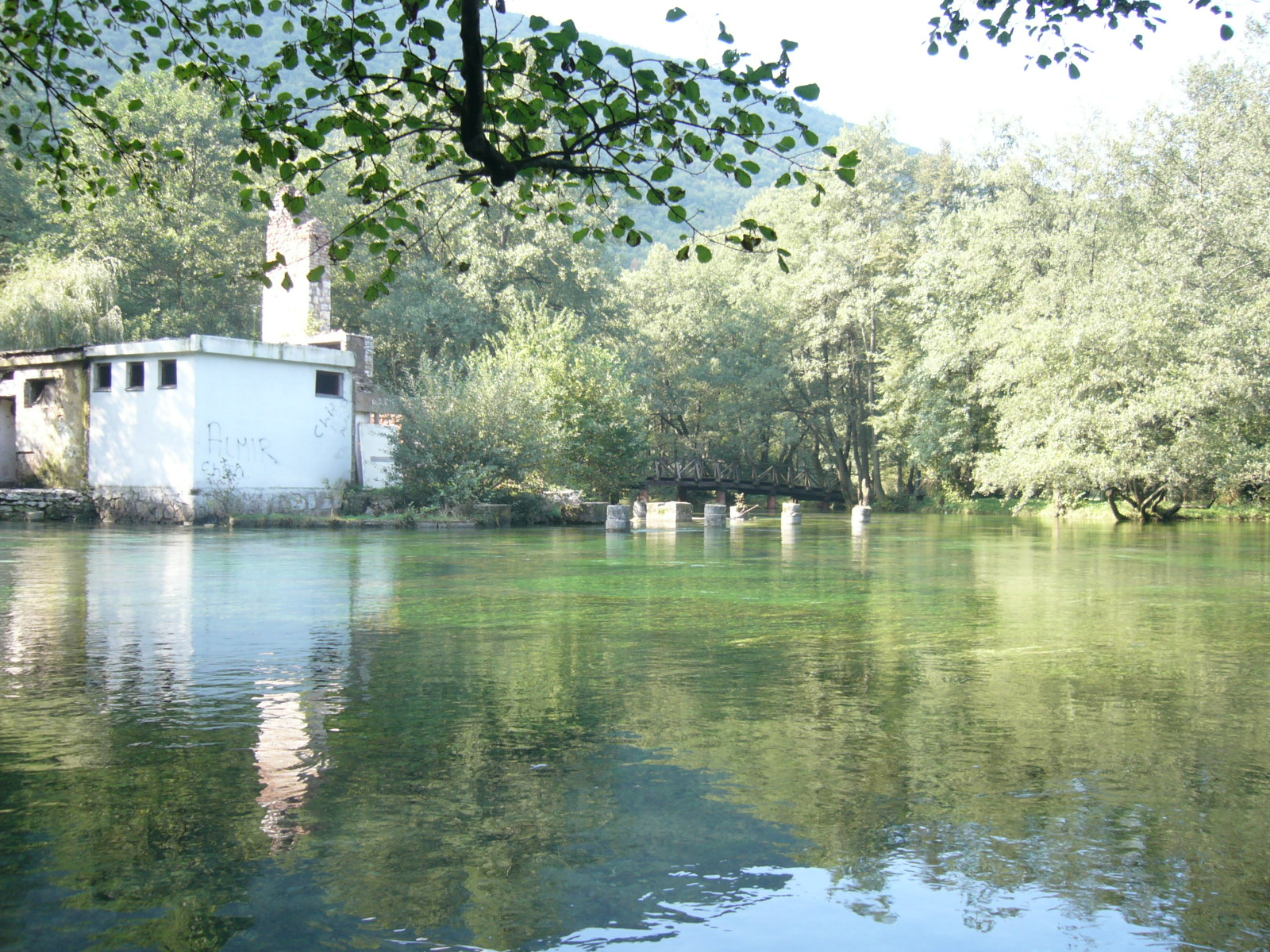
Mala Bosna river in Ilidža

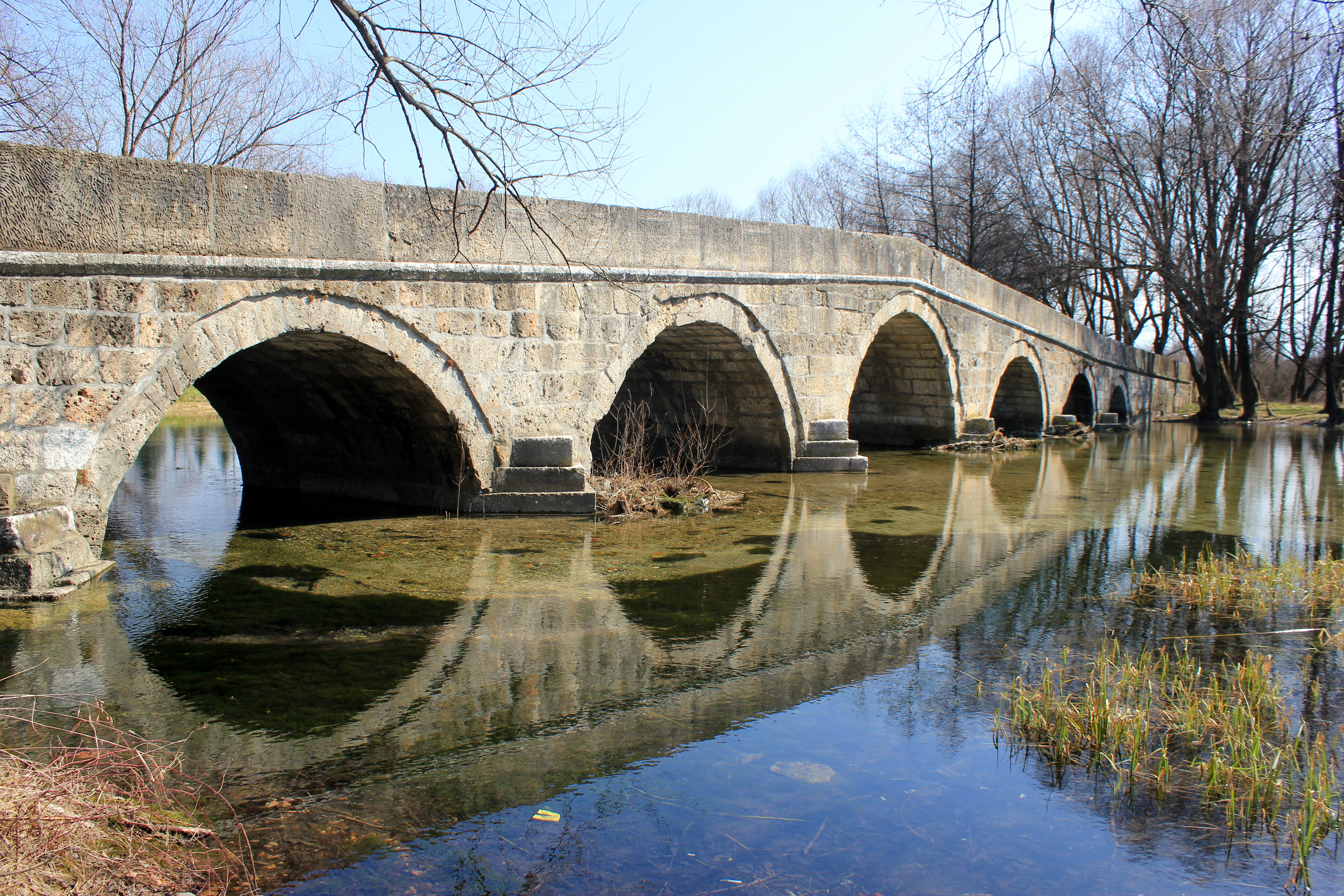
Roman bridge over Mala Bosna river in Ilidža

== See also ==
- List of rivers of Bosnia and Herzegovina
