= Kreševka river =

Kreševka Kreševčica
- Location within Bosnia and Herzegovina
- Native name: Крешевка (Bosnian)

Location
- Country: Bosnia and Herzegovina

Physical characteristics
- Source
  - location: Kreševo
  - coordinates: 43.865280°N 18.044365°E
- Mouth
  - location: Lepenica
  - coordinates: 43°56′19″N 18°05′02″E
- Length: 14.27 km (8.87 mi)

Basin features
- Progression: Lepenica→ Fojnička River→ Bosna→ Sava→ Danube→ Black Sea

Kreševka (Serbian Cyrillic: Крешевка; also called Kreševčica (Крешевчица) by the local population) is a small river passing through Kreševo in central part of Bosnia and Herzegovina. Kreševčica is formed by the merging of two smaller mountain streams, the Vranački Potok and Kojsinski Potok. The Kreševka is left and main tributary of the Lepenica River. The Kreševka and the Lepenica confluence is at the entrance of Kiseljak.

== See also ==
- Bosna
