= Vrbanja =

Vrbanja may refer to:

- Vrbanja, Croatia, a village and a municipality in the Vukovar-Srijem County
- Vrbanja (Banja Luka), a village in Bosnia and Herzegovina
- Vrbanja (Bugojno), a village in Bosnia and Herzegovina
- Vrbanja (Hadžići), a village in Bosnia and Herzegovina
- Vrbanja (river), a tributary of the Vrbas in Bosnia and Herzegovina
- Vrbanja bridge, former name of the Suada Dilberović and Olga Sučić bridge in Sarajevo, Bosnia and Herzegovina
