= Gornji Zovik =

Gornji Zovik may refer to:

- Gornji Zovik (Brčko), a village in Bosnia and Herzegovina
- Gornji Zovik (Hadžići), a village in Bosnia and Herzegovina
