= Kovanići =

- Village
- Location within Bosnia and Herzegovina
- Coordinates: 44.3486224°N 17.9560651°E
- Country: Bosnia and Herzegovina
- Entity: Federation of Bosnia and Herzegovina
- Canton: Zenica-Doboj
- Municipality: Zenica

Area
  - Total: 9.40 sq mi (24.35 km^{2})

Population (2013)
  - Total: 302
  - Density: 32.1/sq mi (12.4/km^{2})
- Time zone: UTC+1 (CET)
  - Summer (DST): UTC+2 (CEST)

Kovanići is a village in the City of Zenica, Bosnia and Herzegovina. It is located on the south banks of the River Bosna.

== Demographics ==
According to the 2013 census, its population was 302, all Bosniaks.
