= Donja Bioča =

Donja Bioča may refer to:

- Donja Bioča (Hadžići), a village in Hadžići, Bosnia and Herzegovina
- Donja Bioča (Ilijaš), a village in Ilijaš, Bosnia and Herzegovina
