= Mokrine =

Mokrine may refer to:

- Mokrine, Bosnia and Herzegovina, a village near Hadžići
- Mokrine, Montenegro, a village in Herceg Novi Municipality
