= Gornja Bioča =

Gornja Bioča may refer to:

- Gornja Bioča (Hadžići), a village in Bosnia and Herzegovina
- Gornja Bioča (Ilijaš), a village in Bosnia and Herzegovina
