= Donji Zovik =

Donji Zovik may refer to:

- Donji Zovik (Brčko), a village in Brčko, Bosnia and Herzegovina
- Donji Zovik (Hadžići), a village in Hadžići, Bosnia and Herzegovina
