= Lepenica (Fojnička River) =

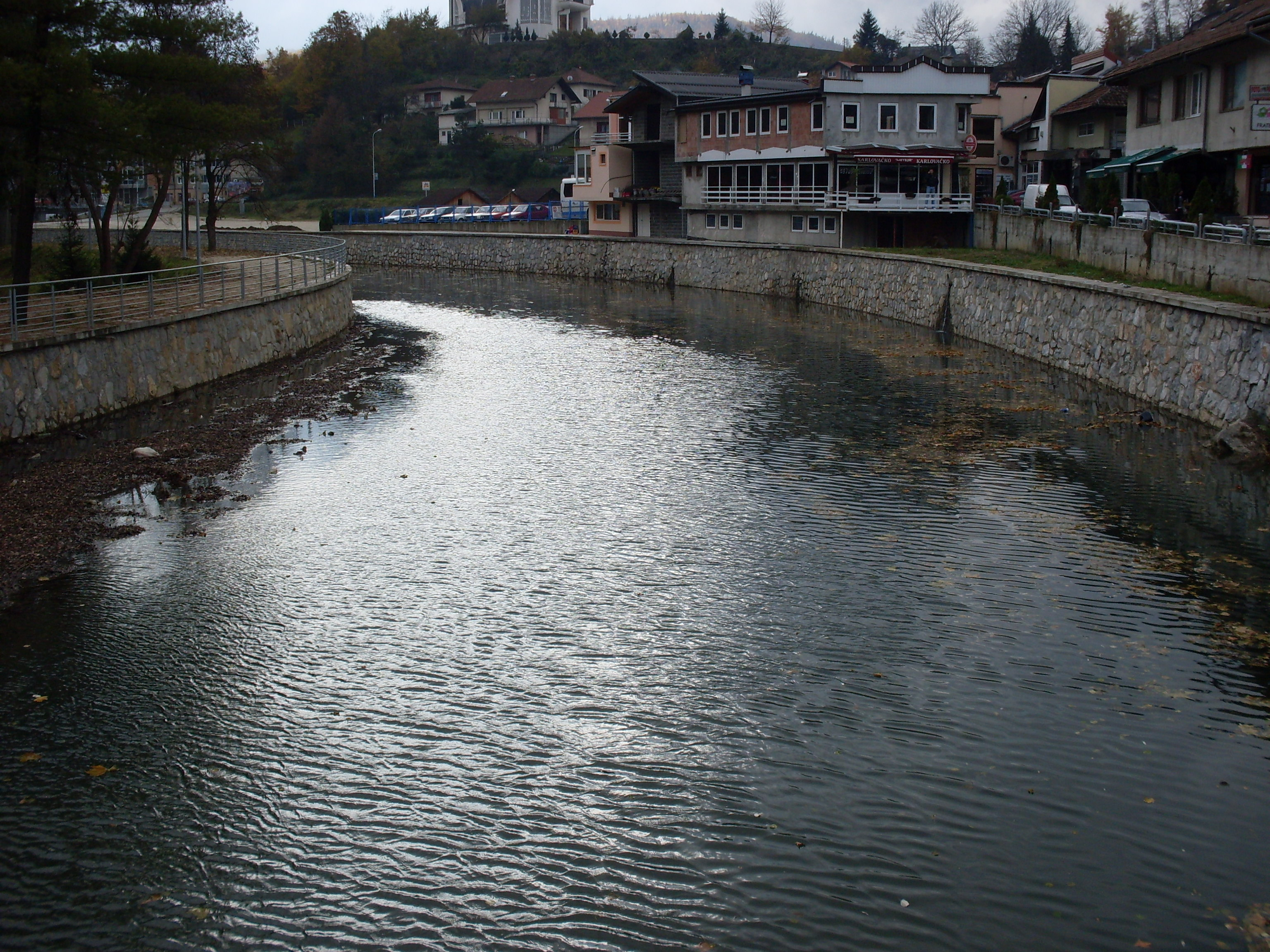

Location
- Country: Bosnia and Herzegovina

Physical characteristics
- Source
  - coordinates: 43.82245492440613°N 18.08149891601537°E
- Mouth
  - location: Fojnička River
  - coordinates: 43.9497°N 18.0824°E
- Length: 33 km

Basin features
- Progression: Fojnička River→ Bosna→ Sava→ Danube→ Black Sea

Lepenica is a small 33 kilometers long river in central Bosnia and Herzegovina. The Lepenica is right and main tributary of the Fojnička River. Its source is confluence of Bijela River and Crna River, between Tarčin and Kreševo. The source of Bijela Rijeka is under the Bjelašnica mountain, while Crna Rijeka springs under the slopes of mountains of Bitovinja and Ivan. It flows through small historical region with a same name, the Lepenica region (župa Lepenica), in which the major settlement is Kiseljak, through which river passes before the confluence with the Fojnička River.

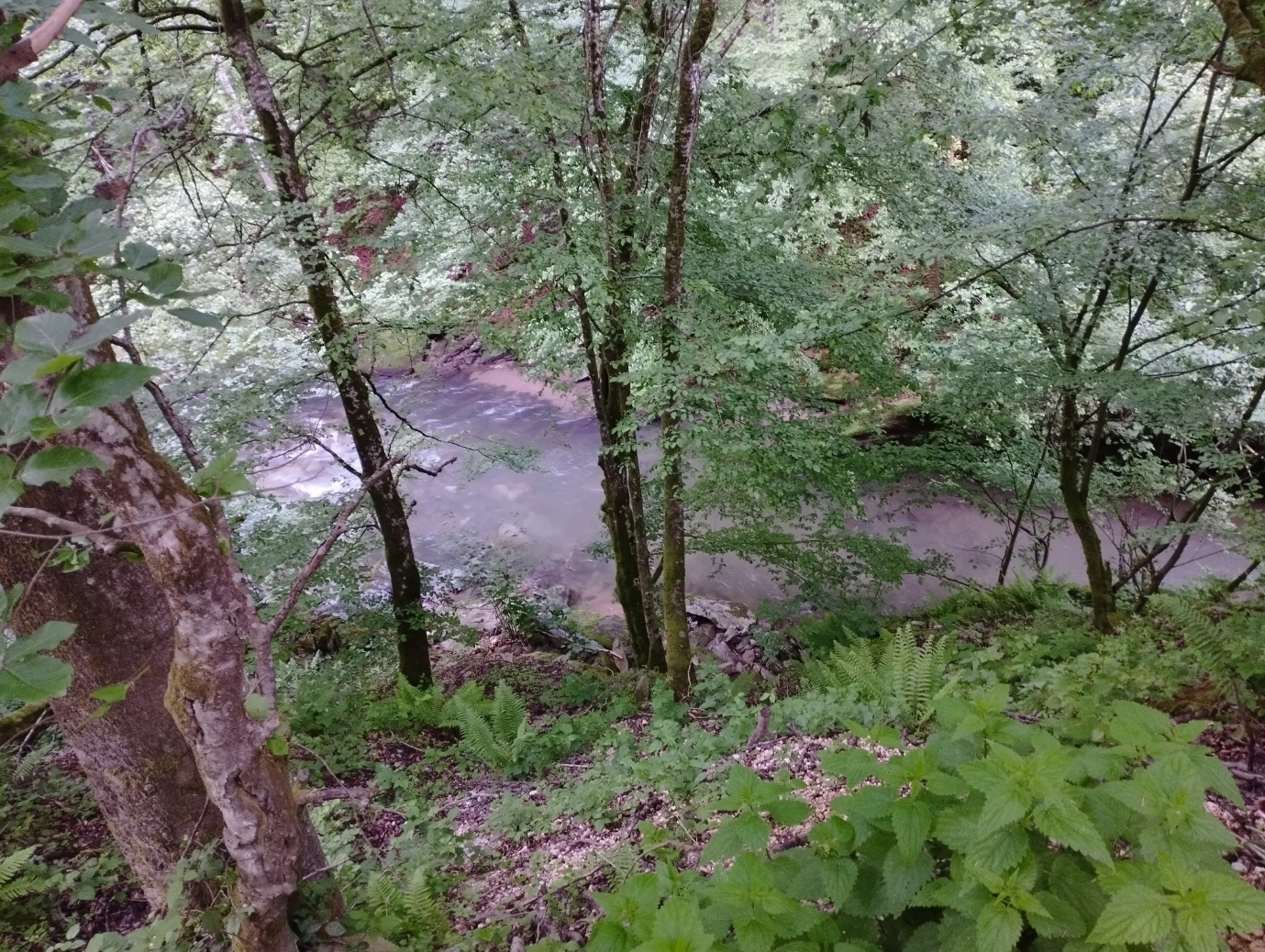
Lepenica upper course, just below the confluence of Bijela River and Crna River.

== See also ==
- Kreševka
