= Miševići =

Miševići is a Serbo-Croatian toponym that may refer to:

- Miševići, Hadžići, in Bosnia and Herzegovina
- Miševići (Nova Varoš), in Serbia
