= Ponirak =

- Village
- Location within Bosnia and Herzegovina
- Coordinates: 44.2791411°N 17.9059574°E
- Country: Bosnia and Herzegovina
- Entity: Federation of Bosnia and Herzegovina
- Canton: Zenica-Doboj
- Municipality: Zenica

Area
  - Total: 2.05 sq mi (5.30 km^{2})

Population (2013)
  - Total: 374
  - Density: 183/sq mi (70.6/km^{2})
- Time zone: UTC+1 (CET)
  - Summer (DST): UTC+2 (CEST)

Ponirak is a village in the City of Zenica, Bosnia and Herzegovina. It is located on the southern banks of the River Bosna.

== Demographics ==
According to the 2013 census, its population was 374.

Ethnicity in 2013
Ethnicity	Number	Percentage
Bosniaks	372	99.5%
other/undeclared	2	0.5%
Total	374	100%
