= Mala Bosna =

Mala Bosna may refer to:

- Mala Bosna (river), head-waters section of the Bosna river
- Mala Bosna, Serbia, a village near Subotica
- Mala Bosna, Croatia, a neighborhood of Vinkovci
