= Dupovci =

- Village
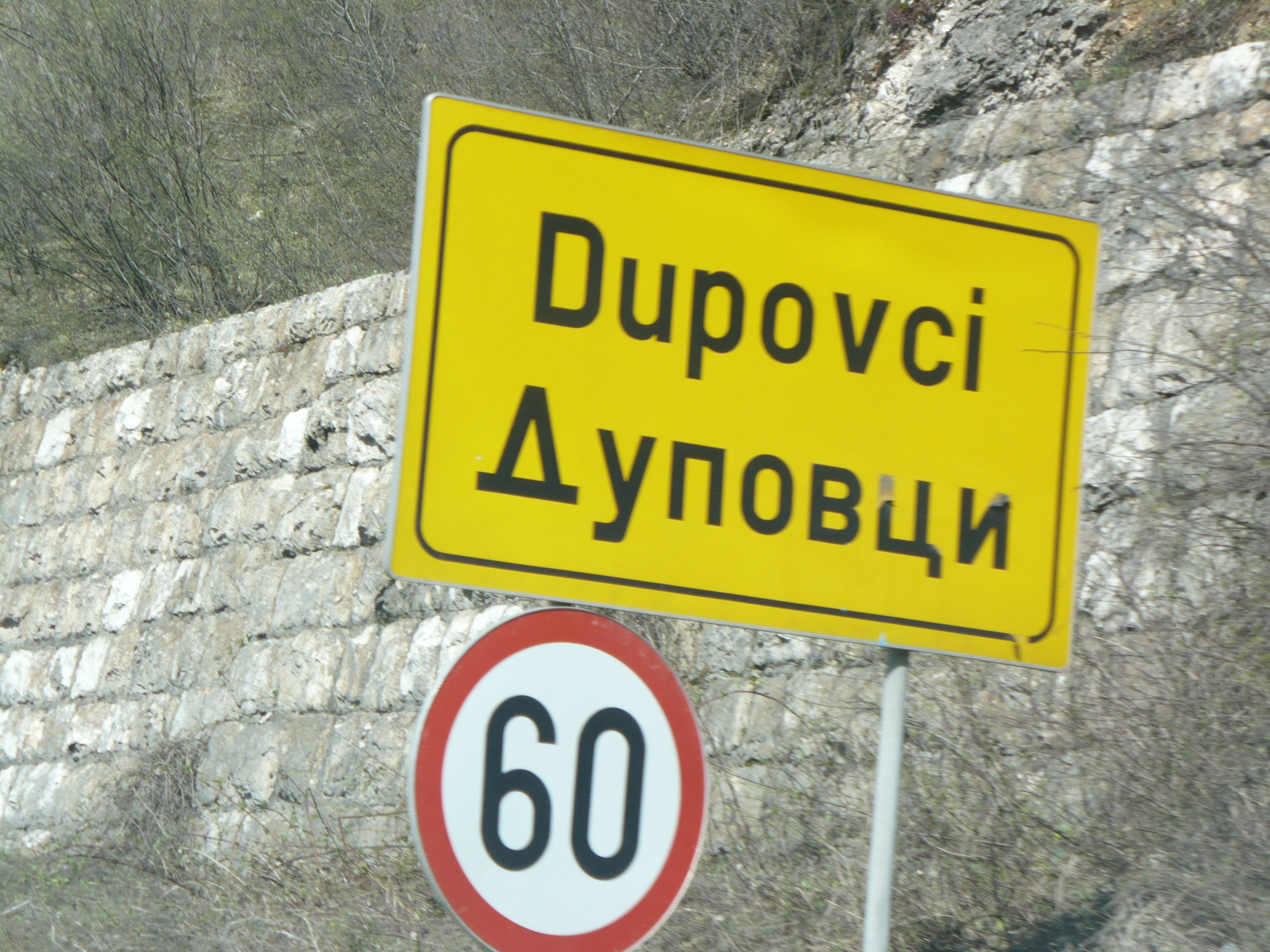

- Location within Bosnia and Herzegovina
- Coordinates: 43.8182032°N 18.184054°E
- Country: Bosnia and Herzegovina
- Entity: Federation of Bosnia and Herzegovina
- Canton: Sarajevo
- Municipality: Hadžići

Area
  - Total: 0.61 sq mi (1.59 km^{2})

Population (2013)
  - Total: 250
  - Density: 410/sq mi (160/km^{2})
- Time zone: UTC+1 (CET)
  - Summer (DST): UTC+2 (CEST)

Dupovci is a village in the municipality of Hadžići, Bosnia and Herzegovina.

== Demographics ==
According to the 2013 census, its population was 250.

Ethnicity in 2013
| Ethnicity | Number | Percentage |
|---|---|---|
| Bosniaks | 238 | 95.2% |
| Serbs | 1 | 0.4% |
| other/undeclared | 11 | 4.4% |
| Total | 250 | 100% |
