= Japalaci =

- Village
- Location within Bosnia and Herzegovina
- Coordinates: 43°47′N 18°06′E
- Country: Bosnia and Herzegovina
- Entity: Federation of Bosnia and Herzegovina
- Canton: Sarajevo
- Municipality: Hadžići

Area
  - Total: 0.27 sq mi (0.71 km^{2})

Population (2013)
  - Total: 342
  - Density: 1,200/sq mi (480/km^{2})
- Time zone: UTC+1 (CET)
  - Summer (DST): UTC+2 (CEST)

Japalaci is a village in the municipality of Hadžići, Bosnia and Herzegovina.

== Demographics ==
According to the 2013 census, its population was 342.

Ethnicity in 2013
Ethnicity	Number	Percentage
Bosniaks	339	99.1%
Serbs	3	0.9%
Total	342	100%
