= Ramići (Hadžići) =

Village in Sarajevo Canton, Bosnia and Herzegovina

- Village
- Location within Bosnia and Herzegovina
- Coordinates: 43°47′04″N 18°07′40″E
- Country: Bosnia and Herzegovina
- Entity: Federation of Bosnia and Herzegovina
- Canton: Sarajevo
- Municipality: Hadžići

Area
  - Total: 0.42 sq mi (1.09 km^{2})

Population (2013)
  - Total: 91
  - Density: 220/sq mi (83/km^{2})
- Time zone: UTC+1 (CET)
  - Summer (DST): UTC+2 (CEST)

Ramići is a village in the municipality of Hadžići, Bosnia and Herzegovina.

== Demographics ==
According to the 2013 census, its population was 91.

Ethnicity in 2013
Ethnicity	Number	Percentage
Bosniaks	86	94.5%
other/undeclared	5	5.5%
Total	91	100%
