= Ušivak =

- Village
- Location within Bosnia and Herzegovina
- Coordinates: 43°49′N 18°14′E
- Country: Bosnia and Herzegovina
- Entity: Federation of Bosnia and Herzegovina
- Canton: Sarajevo
- Municipality: Hadžići

Area
  - Total: 3.26 sq mi (8.44 km^{2})

Population (2013)
  - Total: 835
  - Density: 256/sq mi (98.9/km^{2})
- Time zone: UTC+1 (CET)
  - Summer (DST): UTC+2 (CEST)

Ušivak is a village in the municipality of Hadžići, Bosnia and Herzegovina.

A temporary reception centre for migrants and refugees, located in Ušivak and run by the International Organization for Migration, opened in October 2018.

== Demographics ==
According to the 2013 census, its population was 835.

Ethnicity in 2013
Ethnicity	Number	Percentage
Bosniaks	806	96.5%
Serbs	15	1.8%
Croats	1	0.1%
other/undeclared	13	1.6%
Total	835	100%
