= Hadžići =

- Town and municipality
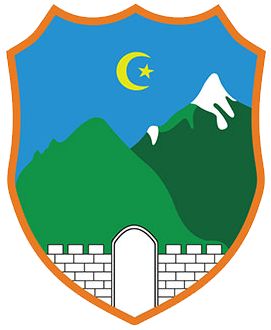
- Coat of arms

- Location of Hadžići within Bosnia and Herzegovina.
- Coordinates: 43°49′18″N 18°12′06″E
- Country: Bosnia and Herzegovina
- Entity: Federation of Bosnia and Herzegovina
- Canton: Sarajevo Canton

Government
  - Municipal mayor: Eldar Čomor (SDA)

Area
  - Town and municipality: 273.3 km^{2} (105.5 sq mi)

Population (2013 census)
  - Town and municipality: 23,891
  - Density: 87.42/km^{2} (226.4/sq mi)
  - Urban: 4,993
- Time zone: UTC+1 (CET)
  - Summer (DST): UTC+2 (CEST)
- Area code: +387 33
- Website: hadzici.ba

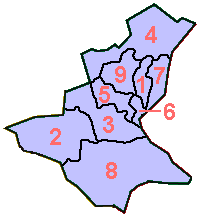
Hadžići is marked with number 2 on this map of the Sarajevo Canton.

Hadžići is a town and municipality located in Sarajevo Canton of the Federation of Bosnia and Herzegovina, an entity of Bosnia and Herzegovina. It is located south west of the city of Sarajevo, on the small Zujevina mountain river under the Bjelašnica mountain. According to the 2013 census, Hadžići municipality has a population of 23,891 residents and the town had 4,993.

== Demographics ==
=== 1971 ===
18,508 total

- 11,150 Bosniaks (60.24%)
- 6,055 Serbs (32.71%)
- 964 Croats (5.20%)
- 116 Yugoslavs (0.62%)
- 223 others (1.23%)

=== 1991 ===
24,200 total

- 15,399 Bosniaks (63.63%)
- 6,362 Serbs (26.28%)
- 746 Croats (3.08%)
- 841 Yugoslavs (3.47%)
- 859 others (3.54%)

=== 2013 ===
23,891 total

- 22,422 Bosniaks(93.85%)
- 243 Serbs (1.02%)
- 195 Croats (0.82%)
- 1,011 others (4.23%)

== Settlements ==
- Bare
- Beganovi
- Binježevo
- Budmolići
- Buturovići kod Drozgometve
- Buturovići kod Osenika
- Češće
- Čičke
- Crepljani
- Deovići
- Do
- Doljani
- Donja Bioča
- Donja Raštelica
- Donji Hadžići
- Donji Zovik
- Dragovići
- Drozgometva
- Dub
- Dupovci
- Duranovići
- Ferhatlije
- Garovci
- Gornja Bioča
- Gornja Raštelica
- Gornji Zovik
- Gradac
- Grivići
- Grude
- Hadžići
- Japalaci
- Jeleč
- Karaosmanovići
- Kasatići
- Kazina Bara
- Korča
- Košćan
- Kućice
- Lihovci
- Lokve
- Luke
- Ljubovčići
- Medvjedice
- Miševići
- Mokrine
- Odžak
- Orahovica
- Osenik
- Pazarić
- Ramići
- Resnik
- Sejdanovići
- Smucka
- Tarčin
- Trnčići
- Trzanj
- Urduk
- Ušivak
- Vrančići
- Vrbanja
- Vukovići
- Žunovnica

== Notable people ==
- Hamdo Ejubović (born 1959), Bosnian politician
- Slobodan Princip (1914-1942), Yugoslav Partisan fighter

== Twin towns – sister cities ==
Hadžići is twinned with:

- Hacılar, Turkey
- Meram, Turkey
- Reus, Spain

== See also ==
- Sarajevo
