= Grude (Hadžići) =

- Village
- Location within Bosnia and Herzegovina
- Coordinates: 43°47′6.9″N 18°08′16.4″E
- Country: Bosnia and Herzegovina
- Entity: Federation of Bosnia and Herzegovina
- Canton: Sarajevo
- Municipality: Hadžići

Area
  - Total: 0.054 sq mi (0.14 km^{2})

Population (2013)
  - Total: 103
  - Density: 1,900/sq mi (740/km^{2})
- Time zone: UTC+1 (CET)
  - Summer (DST): UTC+2 (CEST)

Grude is a village in the municipality of Hadžići, Bosnia and Herzegovina.

== Demographics ==
According to the 2013 census, its population was 103.

Ethnicity in 2013
Ethnicity	Number	Percentage
Bosniaks	99	96.1%
other/undeclared	4	3.9%
Total	103	100%
