= Košćan =

- Village
- Location within Bosnia and Herzegovina
- Coordinates: 43°50′N 18°09′E
- Country: Bosnia and Herzegovina
- Entity: Federation of Bosnia and Herzegovina
- Canton: Sarajevo
- Municipality: Hadžići

Area
  - Total: 0.36 sq mi (0.93 km^{2})

Population (2013)
  - Total: 37
  - Density: 100/sq mi (40/km^{2})
- Time zone: UTC+1 (CET)
  - Summer (DST): UTC+2 (CEST)

Košćan is a village in the municipality of Hadžići, Bosnia and Herzegovina.

== Demographics ==
According to the 2013 census, its population was 37.

Ethnicity in 2013
| Ethnicity | Number | Percentage |
|---|---|---|
| Bosniaks | 33 | 89.2% |
| other/undeclared | 4 | 10.8% |
| Total | 37 | 100% |
