= Lokve, Hadžići =

Lokve
- Village
- Location within Bosnia and Herzegovina
- Coordinates: 43°46′56″N 18°12′04″E
- Country: Bosnia and Herzegovina
- Entity: Federation of Bosnia and Herzegovina
- Canton: Sarajevo
- Municipality: Hadžići

Area
  - Total: 18.03 sq mi (46.71 km^{2})

Population (2013)
  - Total: 543
  - Density: 30.1/sq mi (11.6/km^{2})
- Time zone: UTC+1 (CET)
  - Summer (DST): UTC+2 (CEST)

Lokve is a village in the municipality of Hadžići, Bosnia and Herzegovina.

== Demographics ==
According to the 2013 census, its population was 543.

Ethnicity in 2013
Ethnicity	Number	Percentage
Bosniaks	534	98.3%
other/undeclared	9	1.7%
Total	543	100%
