= Smucka =

- Village
- Location within Bosnia and Herzegovina
- Coordinates: 43°47′N 18°05′E
- Country: Bosnia and Herzegovina
- Entity: Federation of Bosnia and Herzegovina
- Canton: Sarajevo
- Municipality: Hadžići

Area
  - Total: 3.26 sq mi (8.45 km^{2})

Population (2013)
  - Total: 245
  - Density: 75.1/sq mi (29.0/km^{2})
- Time zone: UTC+1 (CET)
  - Summer (DST): UTC+2 (CEST)

Smucka is a village in the municipality of Hadžići, Bosnia and Herzegovina.

== Demographics ==
According to the 2013 census, its population was 245.

Ethnicity in 2013
Ethnicity	Number	Percentage
Bosniaks	227	92.7%
Serbs	6	2.4%
other/undeclared	12	4.9%
Total	245	100%
