= Buturovići kod Osenika =

- Village
- Location within Bosnia and Herzegovina
- Coordinates: 43°48′12″N 18°07′32″E
- Country: Bosnia and Herzegovina
- Entity: Federation of Bosnia and Herzegovina
- Canton: Sarajevo
- Municipality: Hadžići

Area
  - Total: 0.55 sq mi (1.42 km^{2})

Population (2013)
  - Total: 77
  - Density: 140/sq mi (54/km^{2})
- Time zone: UTC+1 (CET)
  - Summer (DST): UTC+2 (CEST)

Buturovići kod Osenika is a village in the municipality of Hadžići, Bosnia and Herzegovina.

== Demographics ==
According to the 2013 census, its population was 77.

Ethnicity in 2013
Ethnicity	Number	Percentage
Bosniaks	73	94.8%
Croats	1	1.3%
other/undeclared	3	3.9%
Total	77	100%
