= Dub (Hadžići) =

- Village
- Location within Bosnia and Herzegovina
- Coordinates: 43°46′51″N 18°09′54″E
- Country: Bosnia and Herzegovina
- Entity: Federation of Bosnia and Herzegovina
- Canton: Sarajevo
- Municipality: Hadžići

Area
  - Total: 0.27 sq mi (0.69 km^{2})

Population (2013)
  - Total: 198
  - Density: 740/sq mi (290/km^{2})
- Time zone: UTC+1 (CET)
  - Summer (DST): UTC+2 (CEST)

Dub is a village.in the municipality of Hadžići, Bosnia and Herzegovina.

== Demographics ==
According to the 2013 census, its population was 198.

Ethnicity in 2013
Ethnicity	Number	Percentage
Bosniaks	191	96.1%
Serbs	6	0.6%
other/undeclared	1	2.8%
Total	198	100%
