= Garovci =

- Village
- Location within Bosnia and Herzegovina
- Coordinates: 43°50′N 18°12′E
- Country: Bosnia and Herzegovina
- Entity: Federation of Bosnia and Herzegovina
- Canton: Sarajevo
- Municipality: Hadžići

Area
  - Total: 0.37 sq mi (0.96 km^{2})

Population (2013)
  - Total: 590
  - Density: 1,600/sq mi (610/km^{2})
- Time zone: UTC+1 (CET)
  - Summer (DST): UTC+2 (CEST)

Garovci is a village in the municipality of Hadžići, Bosnia and Herzegovina.

== Demographics ==
According to the 2013 census, its population was 590.

Ethnicity in 2013
Ethnicity	Number	Percentage
Bosniaks	580	98.3%
Serbs	4	0.7%
other/undeclared	6	1.0%
Total	590	100%
