= Hamdo Ejubović =

Bosnian politician (born 1959)

Municipal Mayor of Hadžići
- In office 30 November 2004 – 18 November 2024
- Preceded by: Halid Bajrić
- Succeeded by: Eldar Čomor

Personal details
- Born: 10 April 1959 (age 67) Hadžići, PR Bosnia and Herzegovina, FPR Yugoslavia
- Party: Party of Democratic Action (1990–present)
- Education: University of Sarajevo (BE)
- Profession: Politician

Hamdo Ejubović (born 10 April 1959) is a Bosnian politician who served as municipal mayor of Hadžići from 2004 to 2024. He has been a member of the Party of Democratic Action since its foundation in 1990.

Political offices
Preceded by Halid Bajrić	Municipal mayor of Hadžići; 2004–2024	Succeeded by Eldar Čomor
