= Ferhatlije =

- Village
- Location within Bosnia and Herzegovina
- Coordinates: 43°47′N 18°09′E
- Country: Bosnia and Herzegovina
- Entity: Federation of Bosnia and Herzegovina
- Canton: Sarajevo
- Municipality: Hadžići

Area
  - Total: 0.11 sq mi (0.28 km^{2})

Population (2013)
  - Total: 90
  - Density: 830/sq mi (320/km^{2})
- Time zone: UTC+1 (CET)
  - Summer (DST): UTC+2 (CEST)

Ferhatlije is a village in the municipality of Hadžići, Bosnia and Herzegovina.

== Demographics ==
According to the 2013 census, its population was 90.

Ethnicity in 2013
Ethnicity	Number	Percentage
Bosniaks	74	82.2%
Serbs	5	5.6%
other/undeclared	11	12.1%
Total	90	100%
