= Vrančići =

- Village
- Location within Bosnia and Herzegovina
- Coordinates: 43°50′N 18°10′E
- Country: Bosnia and Herzegovina
- Entity: Federation of Bosnia and Herzegovina
- Canton: Sarajevo
- Municipality: Hadžići

Area
  - Total: 1.48 sq mi (3.83 km^{2})

Population (2013)
  - Total: 341
  - Density: 231/sq mi (89.0/km^{2})
- Time zone: UTC+1 (CET)
  - Summer (DST): UTC+2 (CEST)

Vrančići is a village in the municipality of Hadžići, Bosnia and Herzegovina.

== Demographics ==
According to the 2013 census, its population was 341.

Ethnicity in 2013
Ethnicity	Number	Percentage
Bosniaks	335	98.2%
other/undeclared	6	1.8%
Total	341	100%
