= Jeleč (Hadžići) =

Jeleč Јелеч
- Village
- Location within Bosnia and Herzegovina
- Coordinates: 43°46′25″N 18°09′27″E
- Country: Bosnia and Herzegovina
- Entity: Federation of Bosnia and Herzegovina
- Canton: Sarajevo
- Municipality: Hadžići

Area
  - Total: 0.21 sq mi (0.55 km^{2})

Population (2013)
  - Total: 166
  - Density: 780/sq mi (300/km^{2})
- Time zone: UTC+1 (CET)
  - Summer (DST): UTC+2 (CEST)

Jeleč is a village in the municipality of Hadžići, Bosnia and Herzegovina.

== Demographics ==
According to the 2013 census, its population was 166.

Ethnicity in 2013
| Ethnicity | Number | Percentage |
|---|---|---|
| Bosniaks | 163 | 98.2% |
| other/undeclared | 3 | 1.8% |
| Total | 166 | 100% |
