= Luke (Hadžići) =

- Village
- Location within Bosnia and Herzegovina
- Coordinates: 43°48′26″N 18°07′11″E
- Country: Bosnia and Herzegovina
- Entity: Federation of Bosnia and Herzegovina
- Canton: Sarajevo
- Municipality: Hadžići

Area
  - Total: 1.97 sq mi (5.11 km^{2})

Population (2013)
  - Total: 524
  - Density: 266/sq mi (103/km^{2})
- Time zone: UTC+1 (CET)
  - Summer (DST): UTC+2 (CEST)

Luke is a village in the municipality of Hadžići, Bosnia and Herzegovina.

== Demographics ==
According to the 2013 census, its population was 524.

Ethnicity in 2013
Ethnicity	Number	Percentage
Bosniaks	482	92.0%
Croats	18	3.4%
Serbs	16	3.1%
other/undeclared	8	1.5%
Total	524	100%
