= Donji Hadžići =

- Village
- Location within Bosnia and Herzegovina
- Coordinates: 43°50′N 18°13′E
- Country: Bosnia and Herzegovina
- Entity: Federation of Bosnia and Herzegovina
- Canton: Sarajevo
- Municipality: Hadžići

Area
  - Total: 0.15 sq mi (0.40 km^{2})

Population (2013)
  - Total: 318
  - Density: 2,100/sq mi (800/km^{2})
- Time zone: UTC+1 (CET)
  - Summer (DST): UTC+2 (CEST)

Donji Hadžići is a village in the municipality of Hadžići, Bosnia and Herzegovina.

== Demographics ==
According to the 2013 census, its population was 318.

Ethnicity in 2013
| Ethnicity | Number | Percentage |
|---|---|---|
| Bosniaks | 305 | 95.9% |
| other/undeclared | 13 | 4.1% |
| Total | 318 | 100% |
