= Čičke =

- Village
- Location within Bosnia and Herzegovina
- Coordinates: 43°47′N 18°06′E
- Country: Bosnia and Herzegovina
- Entity: Federation of Bosnia and Herzegovina
- Canton: Sarajevo
- Municipality: Hadžići

Area
  - Total: 0.18 sq mi (0.46 km^{2})

Population (2013)
  - Total: 120
  - Density: 680/sq mi (260/km^{2})
- Time zone: UTC+1 (CET)
  - Summer (DST): UTC+2 (CEST)

Čičke is a village in the municipality of Hadžići, Bosnia and Herzegovina.

== Demographics ==
According to the 2013 census, its population was 120.

Ethnicity in 2013
Ethnicity	Number	Percentage
Bosniaks	117	97.5%
other/undeclared	3	2.5%
Total	120	100%
