= Češće =

- Village
- Location within Bosnia and Herzegovina
- Coordinates: 43°47′N 18°06′E
- Country: Bosnia and Herzegovina
- Entity: Federation of Bosnia and Herzegovina
- Canton: Sarajevo
- Municipality: Hadžići

Area
  - Total: 0.25 sq mi (0.64 km^{2})

Population (2013)
  - Total: 73
  - Density: 300/sq mi (110/km^{2})
- Time zone: UTC+1 (CET)
  - Summer (DST): UTC+2 (CEST)

Češće is a village in the municipality of Hadžići, Bosnia and Herzegovina.

== Demographics ==
According to the 2013 census, its population was 73.

Ethnicity in 2013
Ethnicity	Number	Percentage
Bosniaks	72	98.6%
Serbs	1	1.4%
Total	73	100%
