= Bare (Hadžići) =

- Village
- Location within Bosnia and Herzegovina
- Coordinates: 43°50′06″N 18°11′10″E
- Country: Bosnia and Herzegovina
- Entity: Federation of Bosnia and Herzegovina
- Canton: Sarajevo
- Municipality: Hadžići

Area
  - Total: 1.23 sq mi (3.18 km^{2})

Population (2013)
  - Total: 2
  - Density: 1.6/sq mi (0.63/km^{2})
- Time zone: UTC+1 (CET)
  - Summer (DST): UTC+2 (CEST)

Bare is a village in the municipality of Hadžići, Bosnia and Herzegovina.

== Demographics ==
According to the 2013 census, its population was 2, both Bosniaks.
