= Budmolići =

- Village
- Location within Bosnia and Herzegovina
- Coordinates: 43°46′N 18°06′E
- Country: Bosnia and Herzegovina
- Entity: Federation of Bosnia and Herzegovina
- Canton: Sarajevo
- Municipality: Hadžići

Area
  - Total: 1.66 sq mi (4.29 km^{2})

Population (2013)
  - Total: 604
  - Density: 365/sq mi (141/km^{2})
- Time zone: UTC+1 (CET)
  - Summer (DST): UTC+2 (CEST)

Budmolići is a village in the municipality of Hadžići, Bosnia and Herzegovina.

== Demographics ==
According to the 2013 census, its population was 604.

Ethnicity in 2013
Ethnicity	Number	Percentage
Bosniaks	592	98.0%
other/undeclared	12	2.0%
Total	604	100%
