= Kazina Bara =

- Village
- Location within Bosnia and Herzegovina
- Coordinates: 43°47′N 18°07′E
- Country: Bosnia and Herzegovina
- Entity: Federation of Bosnia and Herzegovina
- Canton: Sarajevo
- Municipality: Hadžići

Area
  - Total: 0.31 sq mi (0.79 km^{2})

Population (2013)
  - Total: 41
  - Density: 130/sq mi (52/km^{2})
- Time zone: UTC+1 (CET)
  - Summer (DST): UTC+2 (CEST)

Kazina Bara is a village in the municipality of Hadžići, Bosnia and Herzegovina.

== Demographics ==
According to the 2013 census, its population was 41.

Ethnicity in 2013
Ethnicity	Number	Percentage
Bosniaks	38	92.7%
Serbs	2	4.9%
other/undeclared	1	2.4%
Total	41	100%
