= Kasatići =

- Village
- Location within Bosnia and Herzegovina
- Coordinates: 43°48′N 18°12′E
- Country: Bosnia and Herzegovina
- Entity: Federation of Bosnia and Herzegovina
- Canton: Sarajevo
- Municipality: Hadžići

Area
  - Total: 1.81 sq mi (4.68 km^{2})

Population (2013)
  - Total: 186
  - Density: 103/sq mi (39.7/km^{2})
- Time zone: UTC+1 (CET)
  - Summer (DST): UTC+2 (CEST)

Kasatići is a village in the municipality of Hadžići, Bosnia and Herzegovina.

== Demographics ==
According to the 2013 census, its population was 186.

Ethnicity in 2013
Ethnicity	Number	Percentage
Bosniaks	177	95.2%
Serbs	5	2.7%
Croats	1	0.5%
other/undeclared	3	1.6%
Total	186	100%
