= Vukovići (Hadžići) =

Vukovići Вуковићи
- Village
- Location within Bosnia and Herzegovina
- Country: Bosnia and Herzegovina
- Entity: Federation of Bosnia and Herzegovina
- Canton: Sarajevo
- Municipality: Hadžići

Area
  - Total: 2.80 sq mi (7.26 km^{2})

Population (2013)
  - Total: 215
  - Density: 76.7/sq mi (29.6/km^{2})
- Time zone: UTC+1 (CET)
  - Summer (DST): UTC+2 (CEST)

Vukovići is a village in the municipality of Hadžići, Bosnia and Herzegovina.

== Demographics ==
According to the 2013 census, its population was 215, all Bosniaks.
