= Fojnička River =

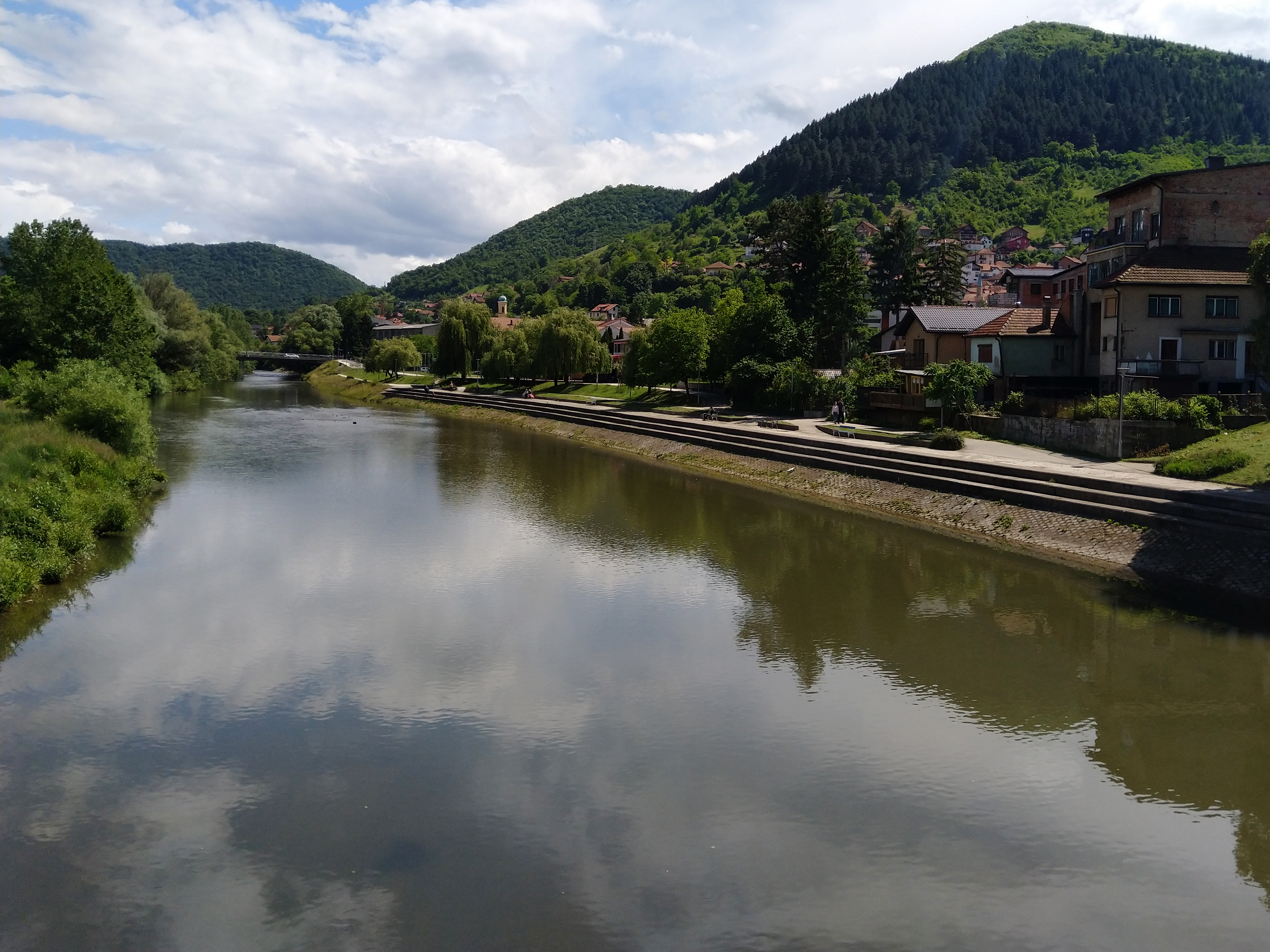
- Fojnička River
- Native name: Фојничка ријека (Bosnian)

Location
- Country: Bosnia and Herzegovina

Physical characteristics
- Source
  - location: Fojnica
  - coordinates: 43.954140653587714°N 17.916013890699947°E
- Mouth
  - location: Bosna
  - coordinates: 43.9888°N 18.1828°E
- Length: 46 km (29 mi)
- Basin size: 727 km^{2} (281 sq mi)

Basin features
- Progression: Bosna→ Sava→ Danube→ Black Sea

Fojnička River (Bosnian: Fojnička rijeka / Фојничка ријека, "Fojnica River") is a left tributary of the Bosna in Bosnia and Herzegovina. It flows for 46 kilometres with a basin area of 727 km^{2}. The Željeznica and the Lepenica are tributaries of the Fojnička River. It is among the last remaining sanctuaries for huchen (Hucho hucho) in the Bosna river basin, the others being the Krivaja, and possibly the Lašva and the Željeznica.

== See also ==
- Visoko
