= Trzanj =

- Village
- Location within Bosnia and Herzegovina
- Coordinates: 43°46′N 18°05′E
- Country: Bosnia and Herzegovina
- Entity: Federation of Bosnia and Herzegovina
- Canton: Sarajevo
- Municipality: Hadžići

Area
  - Total: 0.76 sq mi (1.98 km^{2})

Population (2013)
  - Total: 399
  - Density: 522/sq mi (202/km^{2})
- Time zone: UTC+1 (CET)
  - Summer (DST): UTC+2 (CEST)

Trzanj is a village in the municipality of Hadžići, Bosnia and Herzegovina.

== Demographics ==
According to the 2013 census, its population was 399.

Ethnicity in 2013
| Ethnicity | Number | Percentage |
|---|---|---|
| Bosniaks | 397 | 96.1% |
| other/undeclared | 2 | 2.8% |
| Total | 399 | 100% |
