= Grivići =

- Village
- Location within Bosnia and Herzegovina
- Coordinates: 43°49′38″N 18°10′49″E
- Country: Bosnia and Herzegovina
- Entity: Federation of Bosnia and Herzegovina
- Canton: Sarajevo
- Municipality: Hadžići

Area
  - Total: 2.17 sq mi (5.61 km^{2})

Population (2013)
  - Total: 803
  - Density: 371/sq mi (143/km^{2})
- Time zone: UTC+1 (CET)
  - Summer (DST): UTC+2 (CEST)

Grivići is a village in the municipality of Hadžići, Bosnia and Herzegovina.

== Demographics ==
According to the 2013 census, its population was 803.

Ethnicity in 2013
Ethnicity	Number	Percentage
Bosniaks	780	97.1%
Serbs	2	0.2%
Croats	1	0.1%
other/undeclared	20	2.5%
Total	803	100%
