= Buturovići kod Drozgometve =

- Village
- Location within Bosnia and Herzegovina
- Coordinates: 43°50′31″N 18°09′12″E
- Country: Bosnia and Herzegovina
- Entity: Federation of Bosnia and Herzegovina
- Canton: Sarajevo
- Municipality: Hadžići

Area
  - Total: 0.46 sq mi (1.19 km^{2})

Population (2013)
  - Total: 62
  - Density: 130/sq mi (52/km^{2})
- Time zone: UTC+1 (CET)
  - Summer (DST): UTC+2 (CEST)

Buturovići kod Drozgometve is a village in the municipality of Hadžići, Bosnia and Herzegovina.

== Demographics ==
According to the 2013 census, its population was 62, all Bosniaks.
