= Korča =

- Village
- Location within Bosnia and Herzegovina
- Coordinates: 43°45′N 18°05′E
- Country: Bosnia and Herzegovina
- Entity: Federation of Bosnia and Herzegovina
- Canton: Sarajevo
- Municipality: Hadžići

Area
  - Total: 4.61 sq mi (11.93 km^{2})

Population (2013)
  - Total: 249
  - Density: 54.1/sq mi (20.9/km^{2})
- Time zone: UTC+1 (CET)
  - Summer (DST): UTC+2 (CEST)

Korča is a village in the municipality of Hadžići, Bosnia and Herzegovina.

== Demographics ==
According to the 2013 census, its population was 249.

Ethnicity in 2013
Ethnicity	Number	Percentage
Bosniaks	247	99.2%
other/undeclared	2	0.8%
Total	249	100%
