= Binježevo =

- Village
- Location within Bosnia and Herzegovina
- Coordinates: 43°51′N 18°13′E
- Country: Bosnia and Herzegovina
- Entity: Federation of Bosnia and Herzegovina
- Canton: Sarajevo
- Municipality: Hadžići

Area
  - Total: 1.66 sq mi (4.31 km^{2})

Population (2013)
  - Total: 1,481
  - Density: 890/sq mi (344/km^{2})
- Time zone: UTC+1 (CET)
  - Summer (DST): UTC+2 (CEST)

Binježevo is a village in the municipality of Hadžići, Bosnia and Herzegovina.

== Demographics ==
According to the 2013 census, its population was 1,481.

Ethnicity in 2013
Ethnicity	Number	Percentage
Bosniaks	1,424	96.2%
Serbs	4	0.3%
Croats	1	0.1%
other/undeclared	52	3.5%
Total	1,481	100%
