= Gradac, Hadžići =

Gradac Градац
- Village
- Location within Bosnia and Herzegovina
- Country: Bosnia and Herzegovina
- Entity: Federation of Bosnia and Herzegovina
- Canton: Sarajevo
- Municipality: Hadžići

Area
  - Total: 0.94 sq mi (2.43 km^{2})

Population (2013)
  - Total: 291
  - Density: 310/sq mi (120/km^{2})
- Time zone: UTC+1 (CET)
  - Summer (DST): UTC+2 (CEST)

Gradac is a village in the municipality of Hadžići, Bosnia and Herzegovina.

== Demographics ==
According to the 2013 census, its population was 291.

Ethnicity in 2013
Ethnicity	Number	Percentage
Bosniaks	286	98.3%
other/undeclared	5	1.7%
Total	291	100%
