= Deovići =

- Village
- Location within Bosnia and Herzegovina
- Coordinates: 43°48′N 18°08′E
- Country: Bosnia and Herzegovina
- Entity: Federation of Bosnia and Herzegovina
- Canton: Sarajevo
- Municipality: Hadžići

Area
  - Total: 0.18 sq mi (0.47 km^{2})

Population (2013)
  - Total: 61
  - Density: 340/sq mi (130/km^{2})
- Time zone: UTC+1 (CET)
  - Summer (DST): UTC+2 (CEST)

Deovići is a village in the municipality of Hadžići, Bosnia and Herzegovina.

== Demographics ==
According to the 2013 census, its population was 61.

Ethnicity in 2013
Ethnicity	Number	Percentage
Bosniaks	60	98.4%
Serbs	1	1.6%
Total	61	100%
