= Kućice (Hadžići) =

- Village
- Location within Bosnia and Herzegovina
- Coordinates: 43.8237942°N 18.1869789°E
- Country: Bosnia and Herzegovina
- Entity: Federation of Bosnia and Herzegovina
- Canton: Sarajevo
- Municipality: Hadžići

Area
  - Total: 0.20 sq mi (0.51 km^{2})

Population (2013)
  - Total: 502
  - Density: 2,500/sq mi (980/km^{2})
- Time zone: UTC+1 (CET)
  - Summer (DST): UTC+2 (CEST)

Kućice is a village in the municipality of Hadžići, Bosnia and Herzegovina.

== Demographics ==
According to the 2013 census, its population was 502.

Ethnicity in 2013
Ethnicity	Number	Percentage
Bosniaks	482	96.0%
Serbs	3	0.6%
other/undeclared	17	3.4%
Total	502	100%
