= Beganovi =

- Village
- Location within Bosnia and Herzegovina
- Coordinates: 43°47′N 18°09′E
- Country: Bosnia and Herzegovina
- Entity: Federation of Bosnia and Herzegovina
- Canton: Sarajevo
- Municipality: Hadžići

Area
  - Total: 0.13 sq mi (0.33 km^{2})

Population (2013)
  - Total: 179
  - Density: 1,400/sq mi (540/km^{2})
- Time zone: UTC+1 (CET)
  - Summer (DST): UTC+2 (CEST)

Beganovi is a village in the municipality of Hadžići, Bosnia and Herzegovina.

== Demographics ==
According to the 2013 census, its population was 179.

Ethnicity in 2013
Ethnicity	Number	Percentage
Bosniaks	172	96.1%
Croats	1	0.6%
Serbs	1	0.6%
other/undeclared	5	2.8%
Total	179	100%
