= Duranovići =

- Village
- Location within Bosnia and Herzegovina
- Coordinates: 43°47′N 18°06′E
- Country: Bosnia and Herzegovina
- Entity: Federation of Bosnia and Herzegovina
- Canton: Sarajevo
- Municipality: Hadžići

Area
  - Total: 0.30 sq mi (0.78 km^{2})

Population (2013)
  - Total: 148
  - Density: 490/sq mi (190/km^{2})
- Time zone: UTC+1 (CET)
  - Summer (DST): UTC+2 (CEST)

Duranovići is a village in the municipality of Hadžići, Bosnia and Herzegovina.

== Demographics ==
According to the 2013 census, its population was 148.

Ethnicity in 2013
Ethnicity	Number	Percentage
Bosniaks	138	93.2%
other/undeclared	10	6.8%
Total	148	100%
