= Doljani, Hadžići =

Doljani Дољани
- Village
- Location within Bosnia and Herzegovina
- Coordinates: 43°47′34″N 18°09′12″E
- Country: Bosnia and Herzegovina
- Entity: Federation of Bosnia and Herzegovina
- Canton: Sarajevo
- Municipality: Hadžići

Area
  - Total: 1.36 sq mi (3.53 km^{2})

Population (2013)
  - Total: 211
  - Density: 155/sq mi (59.8/km^{2})
- Time zone: UTC+1 (CET)
  - Summer (DST): UTC+2 (CEST)

Doljani is a village in the municipality of Hadžići, Bosnia and Herzegovina.

== Demographics ==
According to the 2013 census, its population was 211.

Ethnicity in 2013
Ethnicity	Number	Percentage
Bosniaks	189	89.6%
Serbs	8	3.8%
other/undeclared	14	6.6%
Total	211	100%
