= Do (Hadžići) =

Do До
- Village
- Location within Bosnia and Herzegovina
- Coordinates: 43°47′46″N 18°05′04″E
- Country: Bosnia and Herzegovina
- Entity: Federation of Bosnia and Herzegovina
- Canton: Sarajevo
- Municipality: Hadžići

Area
  - Total: 1.41 sq mi (3.64 km^{2})

Population (2013)
  - Total: 161
  - Density: 115/sq mi (44.2/km^{2})
- Time zone: UTC+1 (CET)
  - Summer (DST): UTC+2 (CEST)

Do is a mostly Turk populated village in the municipality of Hadžići, Bosnia and Herzegovina.

== Demographics ==
According to the 2013 census, its population was 161.

Ethnicity in 2013
Ethnicity	Number	Percentage
Turks	111	69.9%
Bosniaks	29	18.0%
Croats	10	6.2%
Serbs	4	2.5%
other/undeclared	7	3.4%
Total	161	100%
