= Dragovići (Hadžići) =

- Village
- Location within Bosnia and Herzegovina
- Coordinates: 43°47′24″N 18°08′15″E
- Country: Bosnia and Herzegovina
- Entity: Federation of Bosnia and Herzegovina
- Canton: Sarajevo
- Municipality: Hadžići

Area
  - Total: 0.95 sq mi (2.47 km^{2})

Population (2013)
  - Total: 221
  - Density: 232/sq mi (89.5/km^{2})
- Time zone: UTC+1 (CET)
  - Summer (DST): UTC+2 (CEST)

Dragovići is a village in the municipality of Hadžići, Bosnia and Herzegovina.

== Demographics ==
According to the 2013 census, its population was 221.

Ethnicity in 2013
Ethnicity	Number	Percentage
Bosniaks	220	99.5%
other/undeclared	1	0.5%
Total	221	100%
