= Urduk =

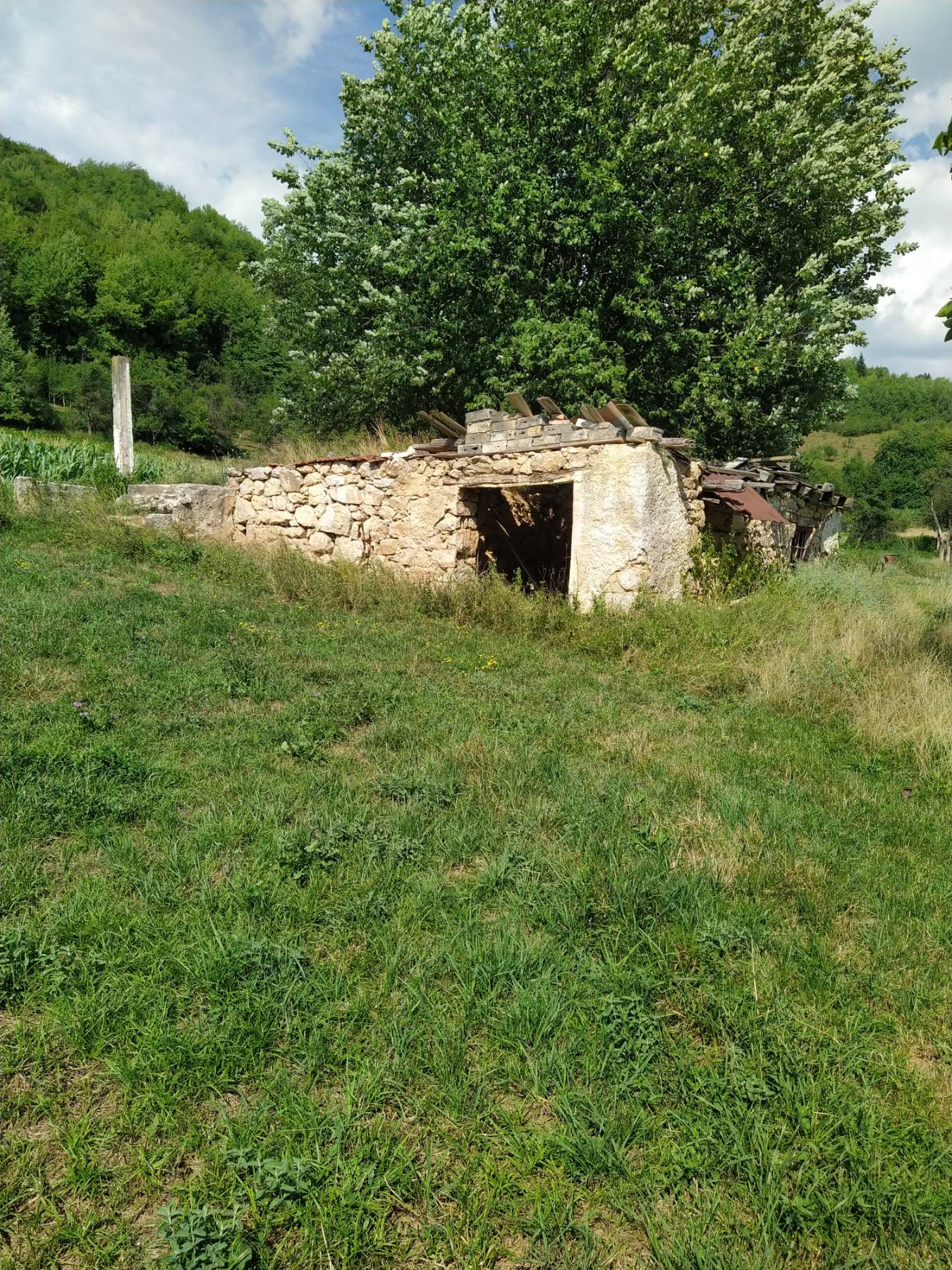
One of the old houses in Urduk

Urduk is a village in the municipality of Hadžići, Bosnia and Herzegovina. It's named after the type of cheese Urdă. There is older part of the village and there houses are built of stone. There is also old Muslim cemetery.

== Demographics ==
According to the 2013 census, its population was 22, all Bosniaks. Before the Bosnian War, the village was Serbian majority, but after the war they mostly moved to eastern Bosnia.
