= Osenik =

- Village
- Location within Bosnia and Herzegovina
- Coordinates: 43°48′N 18°07′E
- Country: Bosnia and Herzegovina
- Entity: Federation of Bosnia and Herzegovina
- Canton: Sarajevo
- Municipality: Hadžići

Area
  - Total: 0.67 sq mi (1.74 km^{2})

Population (2013)
  - Total: 382
  - Density: 569/sq mi (220/km^{2})
- Time zone: UTC+1 (CET)
  - Summer (DST): UTC+2 (CEST)

Osenik is a village in the municipality of Hadžići, Bosnia and Herzegovina.

== Demographics ==
According to the 2013 census, its population was 382.

Ethnicity in 2013
Ethnicity	Number	Percentage
Bosniaks	369	96.6%
Serbs	3	0.8%
other/undeclared	10	2.6%
Total	382	100%
