= Sejdanovići =

- Village
- Location within Bosnia and Herzegovina
- Coordinates: 43°48′N 18°08′E
- Country: Bosnia and Herzegovina
- Entity: Federation of Bosnia and Herzegovina
- Canton: Sarajevo
- Municipality: Hadžići

Area
  - Total: 0.41 sq mi (1.05 km^{2})

Population (2013)
  - Total: 53
  - Density: 130/sq mi (50/km^{2})
- Time zone: UTC+1 (CET)
  - Summer (DST): UTC+2 (CEST)

Sejdanovići is a village in the municipality of Hadžići, Bosnia and Herzegovina.

== Demographics ==
According to the 2013 census, its population was 53, all Bosniaks.
