= Orahovica (Hadžići) =

- Village
- Location within Bosnia and Herzegovina
- Coordinates: 43°47′03″N 18°03′06″E
- Country: Bosnia and Herzegovina
- Entity: Federation of Bosnia and Herzegovina
- Canton: Sarajevo
- Municipality: Hadžići

Area
  - Total: 0.71 sq mi (1.83 km^{2})

Population (2013)
  - Total: 12
  - Density: 17/sq mi (6.6/km^{2})
- Time zone: UTC+1 (CET)
  - Summer (DST): UTC+2 (CEST)

Orahovica is a village in the municipality of Hadžići, Bosnia and Herzegovina. Orahovica is located in the time zone Central European Summer Time.

== Demographics ==
According to the 2013 census, its population was 12, all Bosniaks.
