= Ljubovčići =

- Village
- Location within Bosnia and Herzegovina
- Coordinates: 43°46′N 18°10′E
- Country: Bosnia and Herzegovina
- Entity: Federation of Bosnia and Herzegovina
- Canton: Sarajevo
- Municipality: Hadžići

Area
  - Total: 10.52 sq mi (27.24 km^{2})

Population (2013)
  - Total: 322
  - Density: 30.6/sq mi (11.8/km^{2})
- Time zone: UTC+1 (CET)
  - Summer (DST): UTC+2 (CEST)

Ljubovčići is a village in the municipality of Hadžići, Bosnia and Herzegovina.

== Demographics ==
According to the 2013 census, its population was 322.

Ethnicity in 2013
Ethnicity	Number	Percentage
Bosniaks	320	99.4%
other/undeclared	2	0.6%
Total	322	100%
