= Gornja Bioča (Hadžići) =

- Village
- Location within Bosnia and Herzegovina
- Coordinates: 43°46′12″N 18°06′49″E
- Country: Bosnia and Herzegovina
- Entity: Federation of Bosnia and Herzegovina
- Canton: Sarajevo
- Municipality: Hadžići

Area
  - Total: 14.32 sq mi (37.10 km^{2})

Population (2013)
  - Total: 354
  - Density: 24.7/sq mi (9.54/km^{2})
- Time zone: UTC+1 (CET)
  - Summer (DST): UTC+2 (CEST)

Gornja Bioča is a village in the municipality of Hadžići, Bosnia and Herzegovina.

== Demographics ==
According to the 2013 census, its population was 354.

Ethnicity in 2013
Ethnicity	Number	Percentage
Bosniaks	286	80.8%
other/undeclared	68	19.2%
Total	354	100%
