= Donji Zovik (Hadžići) =

Donji Zovik Доњи Зовик
- Village
- Location within Bosnia and Herzegovina
- Coordinates: 43°47′39″N 18°10′49″E
- Country: Bosnia and Herzegovina
- Entity: Federation of Bosnia and Herzegovina
- Canton: Sarajevo
- Municipality: Hadžići

Area
  - Total: 0.54 sq mi (1.39 km^{2})

Population (2013)
  - Total: 156
  - Density: 291/sq mi (112/km^{2})
- Time zone: UTC+1 (CET)
  - Summer (DST): UTC+2 (CEST)

Donji Zovik is a village in the municipality of Hadžići, Bosnia and Herzegovina.

== Demographics ==
According to the 2013 census, its population was 156.

Ethnicity in 2013
Ethnicity	Number	Percentage
Bosniaks	57	36.5%
Croats	1	0.6%
Serbs	1	0.6%
other/undeclared	97	62.2%
Total	156	100%
