= Vrbanja (Hadžići) =

- Village
- Location within Bosnia and Herzegovina
- Coordinates: 43°47′03″N 18°04′54″E
- Country: Bosnia and Herzegovina
- Entity: Federation of Bosnia and Herzegovina
- Canton: Sarajevo
- Municipality: Hadžići

Area
  - Total: 0.52 sq mi (1.34 km^{2})

Population (2013)
  - Total: 377
  - Density: 729/sq mi (281/km^{2})
- Time zone: UTC+1 (CET)
  - Summer (DST): UTC+2 (CEST)

Vrbanja is a village in the municipality of Hadžići, Bosnia and Herzegovina.

== Demographics ==
According to the 2013 census, its population was 377.

Ethnicity in 2013
Ethnicity	Number	Percentage
Bosniaks	362	96.0%
other/undeclared	15	4.0%
Total	377	100%
