= Donja Raštelica =

- Village
- Location within Bosnia and Herzegovina
- Coordinates: 43°46′N 18°03′E
- Country: Bosnia and Herzegovina
- Entity: Federation of Bosnia and Herzegovina
- Canton: Sarajevo
- Municipality: Hadžići

Area
  - Total: 0.91 sq mi (2.35 km^{2})

Population (2013)
  - Total: 324
  - Density: 357/sq mi (138/km^{2})
- Time zone: UTC+1 (CET)
  - Summer (DST): UTC+2 (CEST)

Donja Raštelica is a village in the municipality of Hadžići, Bosnia and Herzegovina.

== Demographics ==
According to the 2013 census, its population was 324.

Ethnicity in 2013
Ethnicity	Number	Percentage
Bosniaks	311	96.0%
Croats	4	1.2%
Serbs	1	0.3%
other/undeclared	8	2.5%
Total	324	100%
