= Gornji Zovik (Hadžići) =

- Seludija
- Location within Bosnia and Herzegovina
- Coordinates: 43°46′38″N 18°10′18″E
- Country: Bosnia and Herzegovina
- Entity: Federation of Bosnia and Herzegovina
- Canton: Sarajevo
- Municipality: Hadžići

Area
  - Total: 2.16 sq mi (5.59 km^{2})

Population (2013)
  - Total: 419
  - Density: 194/sq mi (75.0/km^{2})
- Time zone: UTC+1 (CET)
  - Summer (DST): UTC+2 (CEST)

Gornji Zovik is a village in the municipality of Hadžići, Bosnia and Herzegovina.

== Demographics ==
According to the 2013 census, its population was 419.

Ethnicity in 2013
Ethnicity	Number	Percentage
Bosniaks	397	94.7%
other/undeclared	22	5.3%
Total	419	100%
