= Gornja Raštelica =

- Village
- Location within Bosnia and Herzegovina
- Coordinates: 43°47′N 18°03′E
- Country: Bosnia and Herzegovina
- Entity: Federation of Bosnia and Herzegovina
- Canton: Sarajevo
- Municipality: Hadžići

Area
  - Total: 4.96 sq mi (12.85 km^{2})

Population (2013)
  - Total: 36
  - Density: 7.3/sq mi (2.8/km^{2})
- Time zone: UTC+1 (CET)
  - Summer (DST): UTC+2 (CEST)

Gornja Raštelica is a village in the municipality of Hadžići, Bosnia and Herzegovina.

== Demographics ==
According to the 2013 census, its population was 36.

Ethnicity in 2013
Ethnicity	Number	Percentage
Bosniaks	32	88.9%
other/undeclared	4	11.1%
Total	36	100%
