= Resnik (Hadžići) =

- Village
- Location within Bosnia and Herzegovina
- Coordinates: 43°47′13″N 18°07′58″E
- Country: Bosnia and Herzegovina
- Entity: Federation of Bosnia and Herzegovina
- Canton: Sarajevo
- Municipality: Hadžići

Area
  - Total: 0.17 sq mi (0.44 km^{2})

Population (2013)
  - Total: 557
  - Density: 3,300/sq mi (1,300/km^{2})
- Time zone: UTC+1 (CET)
  - Summer (DST): UTC+2 (CEST)

Resnik is a village in the municipality of Hadžići, Bosnia and Herzegovina.

== Demographics ==
According to the 2013 census, its population was 557.

Ethnicity in 2013
Ethnicity	Number	Percentage
Bosniaks	284	51.0%
Croats	5	0.9%
other/undeclared	268	48.1%
Total	557	100%
