= Miševići, Bosnia and Herzegovina =

Miševići
- Village
- Location within Bosnia and Herzegovina
- Coordinates: 43°51′N 18°12′E
- Country: Bosnia and Herzegovina
- Entity: Federation of Bosnia and Herzegovina
- Canton: Sarajevo
- Municipality: Hadžići

Area
  - Total: 1.79 sq mi (4.63 km^{2})

Population (2013)
  - Total: 1,795
  - Density: 1,000/sq mi (388/km^{2})
- Time zone: UTC+1 (CET)
  - Summer (DST): UTC+2 (CEST)

Miševići is a village in the municipality of Hadžići, Bosnia and Herzegovina.

== Demographics ==
According to the 2013 census, its population was 1,795.

Ethnicity in 2013
| Ethnicity | Number | Percentage |
|---|---|---|
| Bosniaks | 1,716 | 95.6% |
| Serbs | 22 | 1.2% |
| Croats | 15 | 0.8% |
| other/undeclared | 42 | 2.3% |
| Total | 1,795 | 100% |
