= Donja Bioča (Hadžići) =

- Village
- Location within Bosnia and Herzegovina
- Coordinates: 43°47′00″N 18°06′17″E
- Country: Bosnia and Herzegovina
- Entity: Federation of Bosnia and Herzegovina
- Canton: Sarajevo
- Municipality: Hadžići

Area
  - Total: 0.23 sq mi (0.60 km^{2})

Population (2013)
  - Total: 46
  - Density: 200/sq mi (77/km^{2})
- Time zone: UTC+1 (CET)
  - Summer (DST): UTC+2 (CEST)

Donja Bioča is a village in the municipality of Hadžići, Bosnia and Herzegovina.

== Demographics ==
According to the 2013 census, its population was 46.

Ethnicity in 2013
Ethnicity	Number	Percentage
Bosniaks	35	76.1%
Serbs	2	4.3%
other/undeclared	9	19.6%
Total	46	100%
