= Pazarić =

- Village
- Location within Bosnia and Herzegovina
- Coordinates: 43°47′N 18°10′E
- Country: Bosnia and Herzegovina
- Entity: Federation of Bosnia and Herzegovina
- Canton: Sarajevo
- Municipality: Hadžići

Area
  - Total: 0.45 sq mi (1.16 km^{2})

Population (2013)
  - Total: 973
  - Density: 2,170/sq mi (839/km^{2})
- Time zone: UTC+1 (CET)
  - Summer (DST): UTC+2 (CEST)

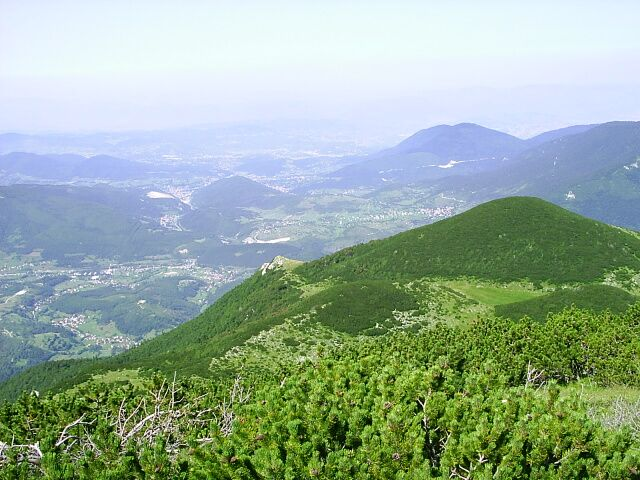

Pazarić is a village in the municipality of Hadžići, Bosnia and Herzegovina.

== Demographics ==
According to the 2013 census, its population was 973.

Ethnicity in 2013
Ethnicity	Number	Percentage
Bosniaks	900	92.5%
Serbs	17	1.7%
Croats	3	0.3%
other/undeclared	53	5.4%
Total	973	100%
