= Željeznica (Bosna) =

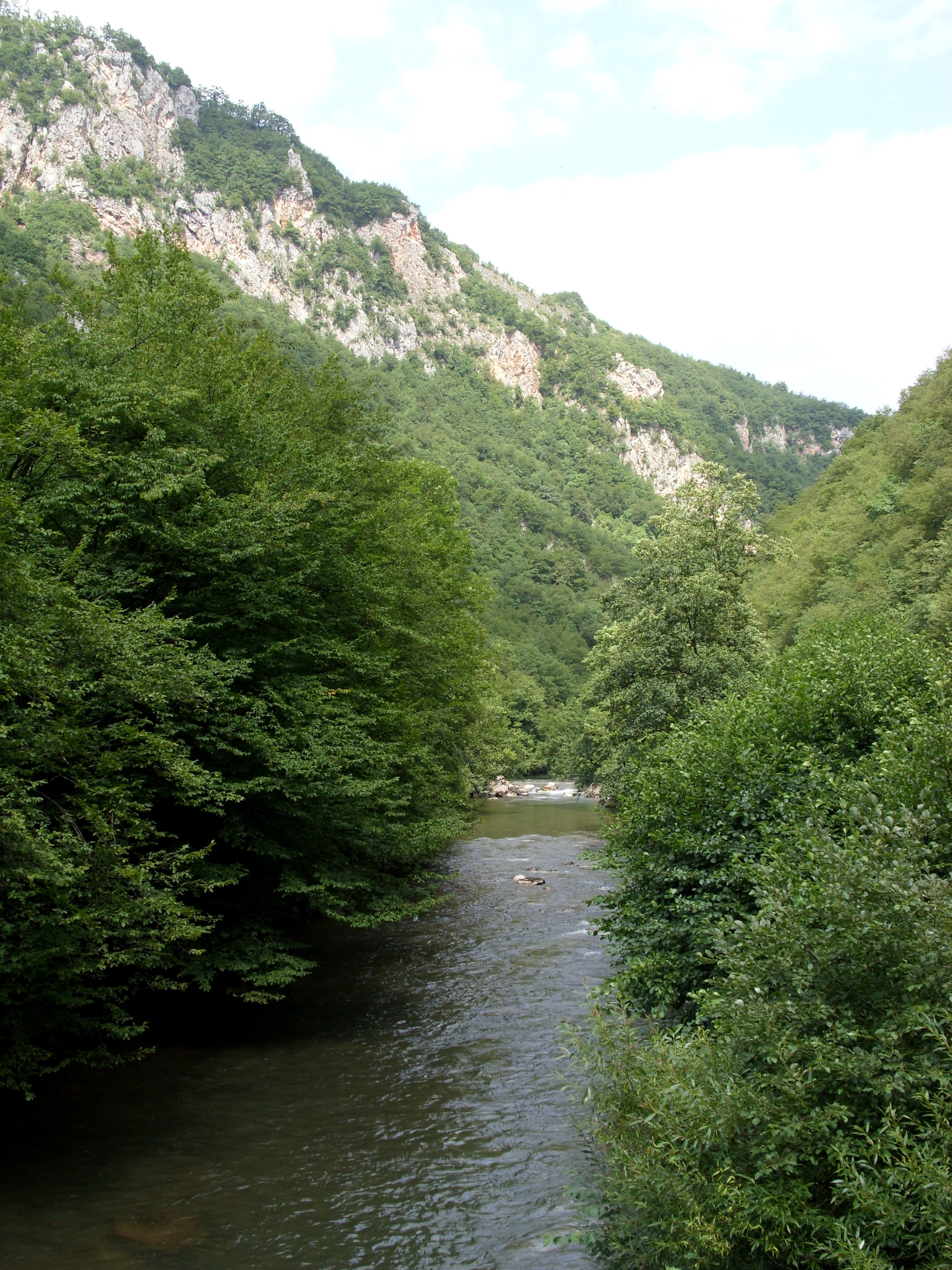
- The Željeznica river canyon near Sarajevo

- Location within Bosnia and Herzegovina

Location
- Country: Bosnia and Herzegovina

Physical characteristics
- Source
  - location: Godinja
  - coordinates: 43.6468052°N 18.3784372°E
  - elevation: 1,030 metres (3,380 ft)
- Mouth
  - location: Bosna
  - coordinates: 43.8393258°N 18.2868893°E
  - elevation: 490 metres (1,610 ft)

Basin features
- Progression: Bosna→ Sava→ Danube→ Black Sea

The Željeznica (Serbian Cyrillic: Жељезница) is a river in Bosnia and Herzegovina, which rises at the foot of the Treskavica Mountain. It has a number of rapids and whirlpools, including those of Turovi. Kazani is regarded as the most attractive place in the canyon, where round hollows, "kettles", give the impression of boiling water. The kettles are about half to one meter deep and 0,30 to 0,70 cm wide in radius, and they are frequent in the riverbed.

The Željeznica river is one of the chief geographic features of the western Sarajevo field (Sarajevo polje). It flows through the municipalities of Trnovo and Istočna Ilidža from the south and eventually meets up with the Mala Bosna river, a stretch of the Bosna between its source at Vrelo Bosne and Željeznica confluence, all near Ilidža, Sarajevo. The Željeznica and the Mala Bosna form the Bosna.

The Željeznica river is the western boundary of Jahorina mountain. The archaeological site of Butmir is located on the right bank of the Željeznica river, relatively close to the source of the Bosna river. The terrace next to the Željeznica river was well suited to late Neolithic settlement.

The Željeznica is possibly among the last remaining sanctuaries for huchen (Hucho hucho) in the Bosna river basin, the others being the Krivaja, the Fojnica, and possibly the Lašva.

A small derivational hydroelectric power plant, HPP Bogatići, is built on the river, getting its water from the Lake Bogatići reservoir.

== See also ==
- List of rivers of Bosnia and Herzegovina
