= Mokrine, Bosnia and Herzegovina =

Mokrine
- Village
- Location within Bosnia and Herzegovina
- Coordinates: 43°50′N 18°07′E
- Country: Bosnia and Herzegovina
- Entity: Federation of Bosnia and Herzegovina
- Canton: Sarajevo
- Municipality: Hadžići

Area
  - Total: 1.49 sq mi (3.85 km^{2})

Population (2013)
  - Total: 171
  - Density: 115/sq mi (44.4/km^{2})
- Time zone: UTC+1 (CET)
  - Summer (DST): UTC+2 (CEST)

Mokrine is a village in the municipality of Hadžići, Bosnia and Herzegovina.

== Demographics ==
According to the 2013 census, its population was 171, all Bosniaks.
