= Lašva =

Lašva Лашва
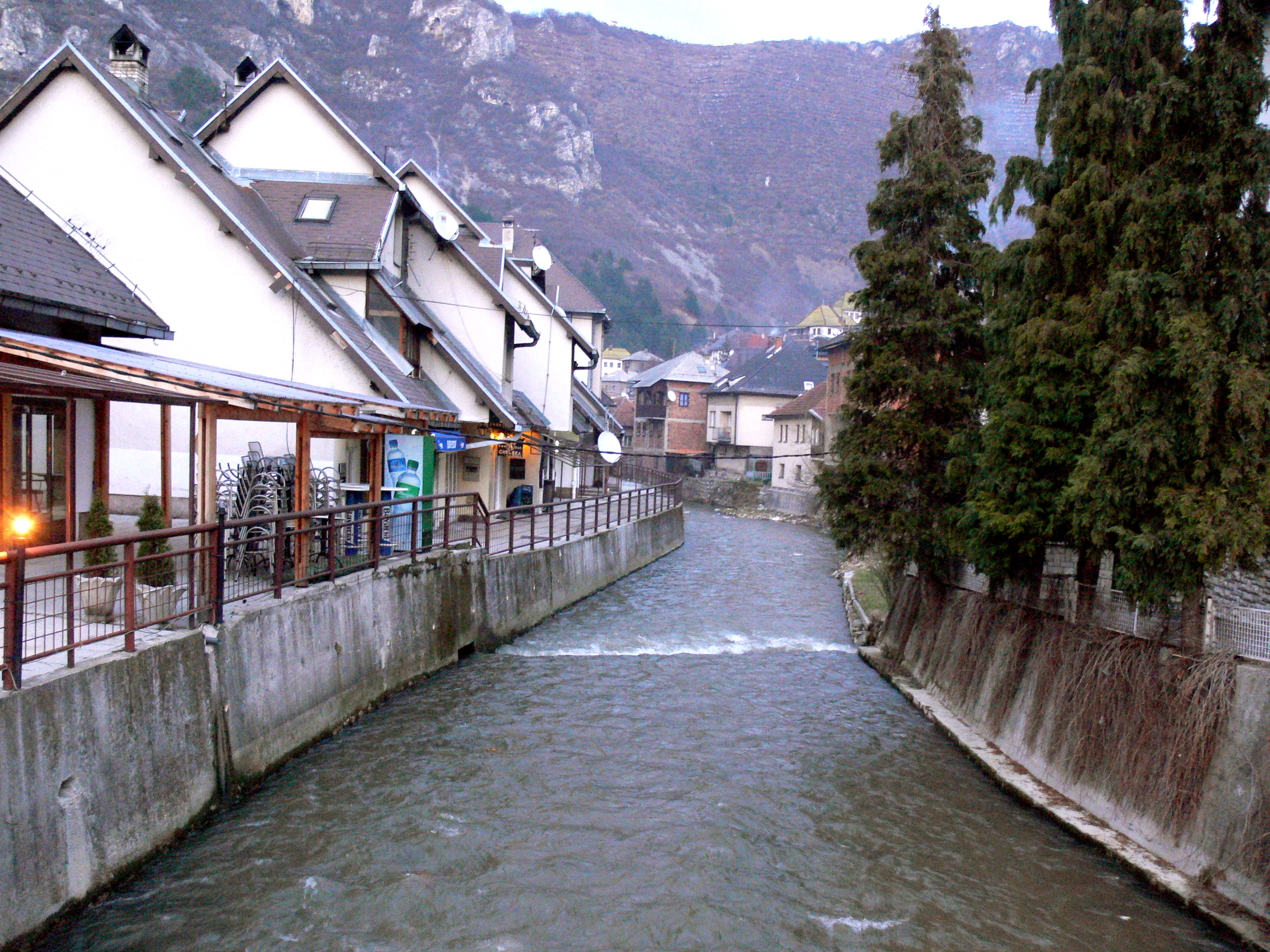
- The Lašva in Travnik

Location
- Country: Bosnia and Herzegovina

Physical characteristics
- Source
  - location: Karaulska Lašva and Komarska Lašva
  - coordinates: 44.233122662467295°N 17.456129737760445°E
- Mouth
  - location: river Bosna, near Zenica
  - coordinates: 44.1390°N 17.9323°E
- Length: 56.6 km (35.2 mi)
- Basin size: 958.1 km^{2} (369.9 sq mi)

Basin features
- Progression: Bosna→ Sava→ Danube→ Black Sea

The Lašva (Serbian Cyrillic: Лашва) is a river in Central Bosnia, Bosnia and Herzegovina. It is a left tributary of the Bosna.

It originates from the confluence of two "little Lašvas", the Karaulska Lašva and Komarska Lašva in Turbe. The Lašva flows through Travnik, then through Vitez before draining into the Bosna.

== See also ==
- Lašva Valley
- Turbe
- Travnik
