= Bosna (river) =

River in Bosnia and Herzegovina

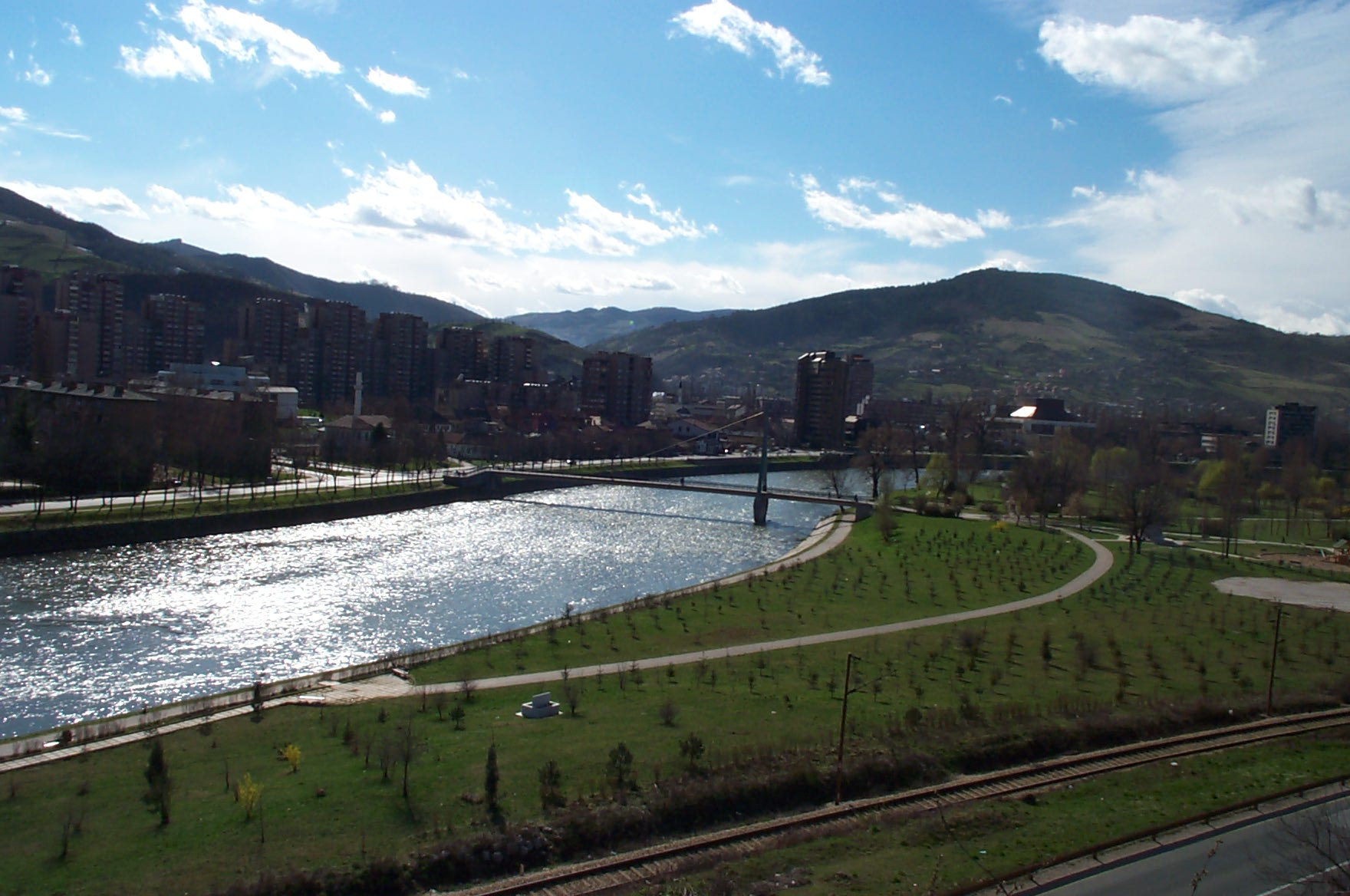
- The Bosna River flowing through Zenica.

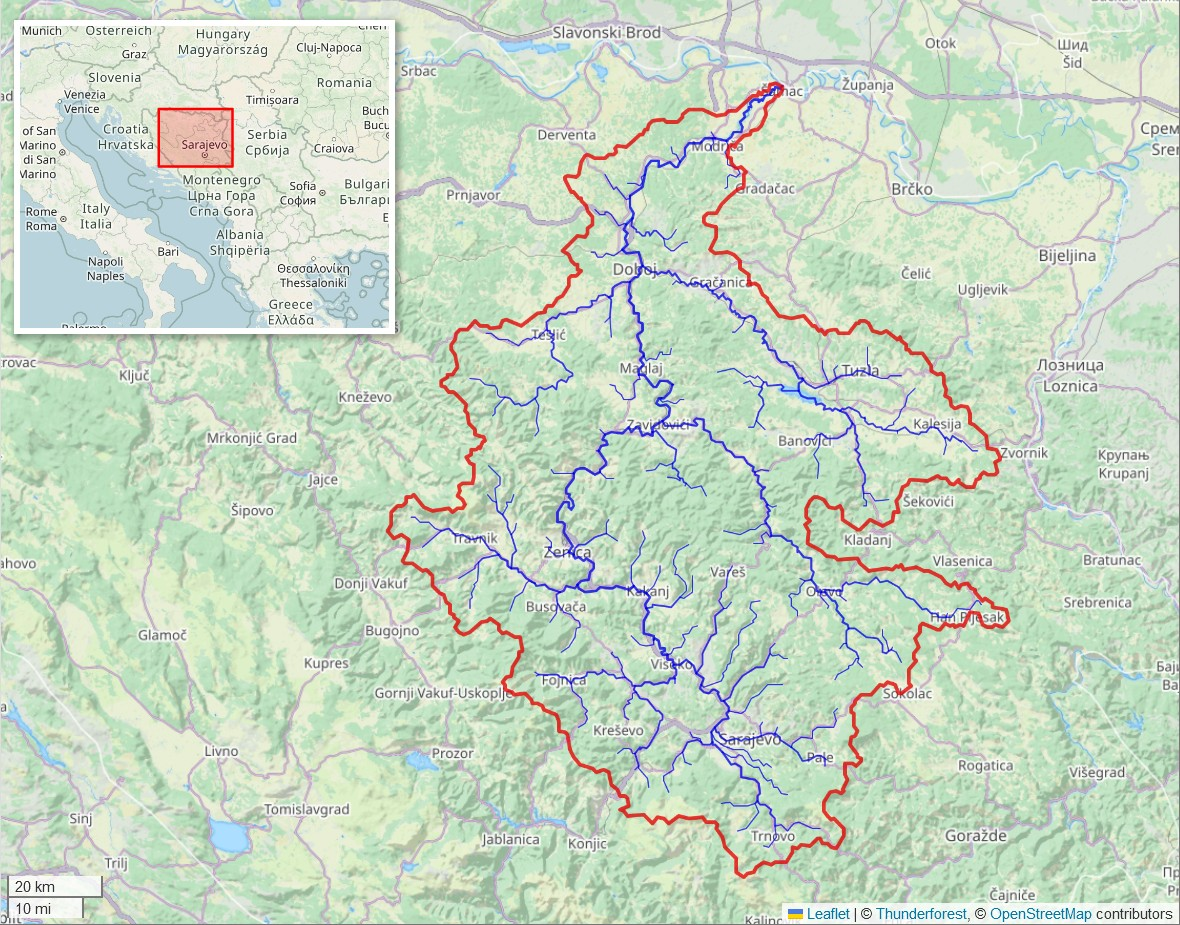
- Bosna River watershed (Interactive map)

Location
- Country: Bosnia and Herzegovina
- Cities: Visoko, Kakanj, Zenica, Maglaj, Zavidovići, Doboj, Modriča, Bosanski Šamac

Physical characteristics
- Source: Vrelo Bosne
  - location: Igman, Ilidža, Bosnia and Herzegovina
  - coordinates: 43°49′6.6″N 18°16′11.9″E
  - elevation: 520 m (1,710 ft); (494.5 m (1,622 ft) a.s.l. according to an earlier source)
- Mouth: Sava
  - location: Bosanski Šamac, Bosnia and Herzegovina
  - coordinates: 45°4′0″N 18°28′1″E
  - elevation: 78 m (256 ft)
- Length: 281.6 km (175.0 mi)
- Basin size: 10,810 km^{2} (4,170 sq mi)
- Discharge
  - average: 174 m^{3}/s (6,100 cu ft/s)

Basin features
- Progression: Sava→ Danube→ Black Sea

The Bosna (Serbian Cyrillic: Босна, pronounced [bɔ̂sna]) is the third longest river in Bosnia and Herzegovina, and is considered one of the country's three major internal rivers, along with the Neretva and the Vrbas. The other three major rivers of Bosnia and Herzegovina are the Una, to the northwest; the Sava, to the north, and the Drina, to the east. The river is thought to be the namesake of Bosnia. The river Bosna flows for 282 kilometers (175 mi).

The river is possibly mentioned for the first time during the 1st century AD by Roman historian Marcus Velleius Paterculus under the name Bathinus. Another basic source that is associated with the hydronym Bathinus is the Salonitan inscription of the governor of Dalmatia, Publius Cornelius Dolabella, where it is said that the Bathinum river divides the Breuci from the Osseriates. Another name could also have been Basante.

According to philologist Anton Mayer, the name Bosna could be derived from Illyrian Bass-an-as, which would be a diversion of the Proto-Indo-European root bʰegʷ, meaning 'the running water'.

== Geography and sectioning ==
The Bosna River has created the Bosna River Valley. The valley has been developed as the country's industrial hub and is home to nearly a million people, who live primarily in several major cities.

=== Vrelo Bosne and Mala Bosna ===
The Bosna's source is the Vrelo Bosne spring, located at 520 m (1,710 ft) a.s.l. (according to an earlier source, 494.5 m (1,622 ft) a.s.l.) at the foothills of mount Igman, on the outskirts of Sarajevo, capital of Bosnia and Herzegovina. The spring is one of Bosnia and Herzegovina's chief natural landmarks and tourist attractions.

The course between the source and its largest tributary in this section, the Željeznica, which runs in from the right, is referred to as the Mala Bosna (transl. Little Bosna), but the section is often extended all the way to its confluence with the Miljacka, four kilometers downstream. Its tributaries between the source and the Željeznica are first the Večerica and then the Bukulaš, while in the region of the extended Mala Bosna course it further receives, first the Željeznica from the right, then approx. 600 meters downstream the Zujevina, the only tributary from the left in this region, followed by the Dobrinja (a.k.a. Tilava) 1.5 km, and then 2 km further the Miljacka, both from the right.

=== Upper Bosna ===
The Upper Bosna is a section between its source and the mouth of the Lašva, a left tributary, just upstream from Zenica. The section encompasses the entire region between Ilidža, near Sarajevo, and the Lašva, including the spacious valley between Ilijaš and Kakanj. The Visoko region, with its medieval heritage, is at the center of this area.

=== Middle Bosna ===
The Middle Bosna is mostly composed of gorges, with steep slopes and narrow passages, between Zenica and Doboj. In this section, there are several medieval sites, such as Vranduk, Maglaj and Doboj.

=== Lower Bosna ===
The Lower Bosna is the last section of the Bosna. From Doboj, the river continues northwards, approaching the Sava through the heart of Bosnia, passing through the lowlands of Posavina, and eventually becomes a right tributary of the Sava in Bosanski Šamac. There, it empties at around 80 metres (260 ft) above the sea level.

== Course and tributaries ==
The Bosna flows through a number of cantons. From its starting point in the Sarajevo Canton, it flows through the Zenica-Doboj Canton, and the Posavina Canton, in that order. On its way north, the Bosna also passes through the cities of Visoko, Zenica, Maglaj, Doboj, Modriča and Bosanski Šamac.

The main right tributaries are: Željeznica, Miljacka, Ljubina, Misoča, Stavnja, Trstionica, Zgošća, Gostović, Krivaja and Spreča. On the left, the main tributaries are: Zujevina, Fojnica, Lašva and Usora.

== Image gallery ==
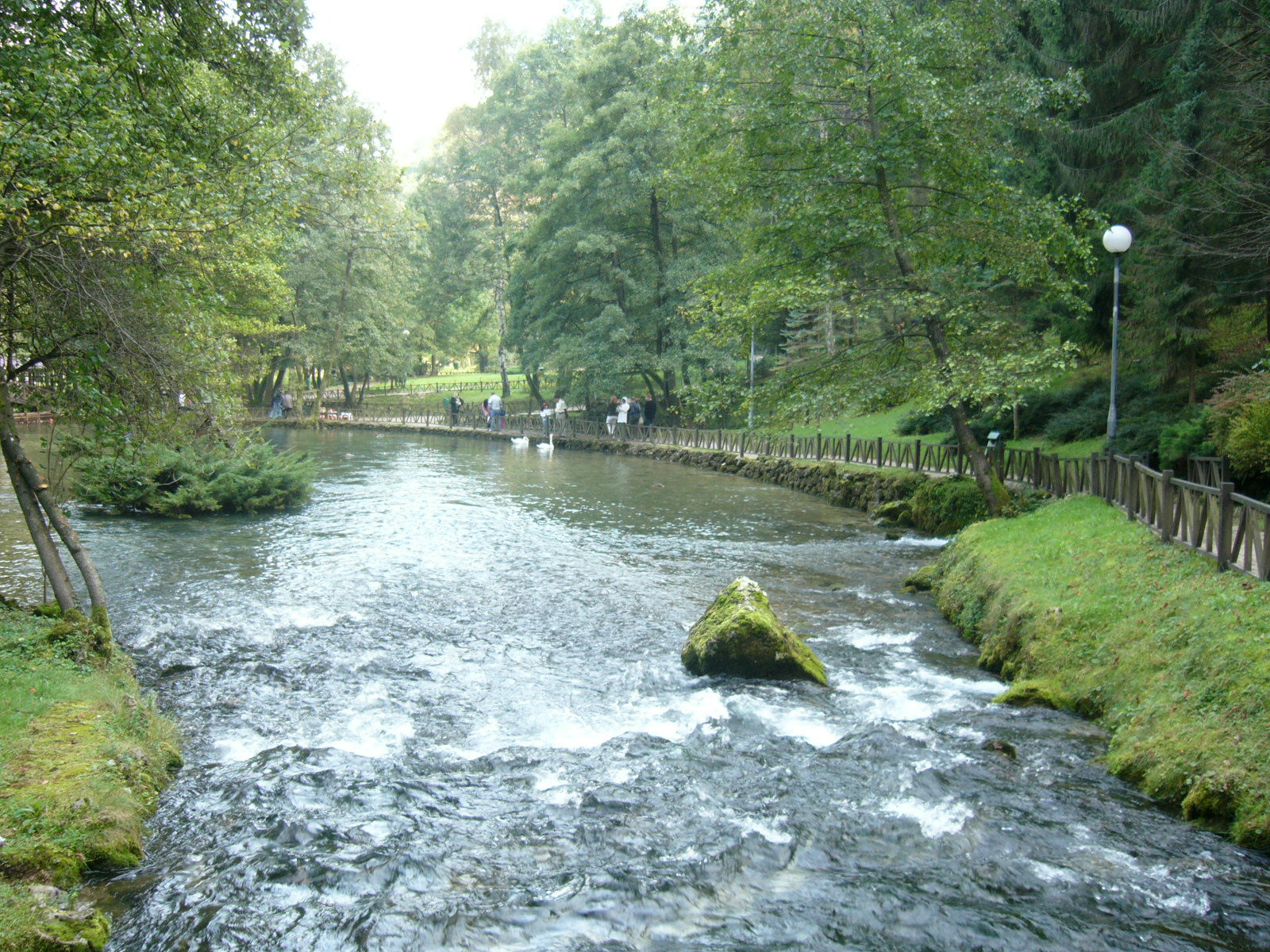
Vrelo Bosne, source of the river just outside Sarajevo

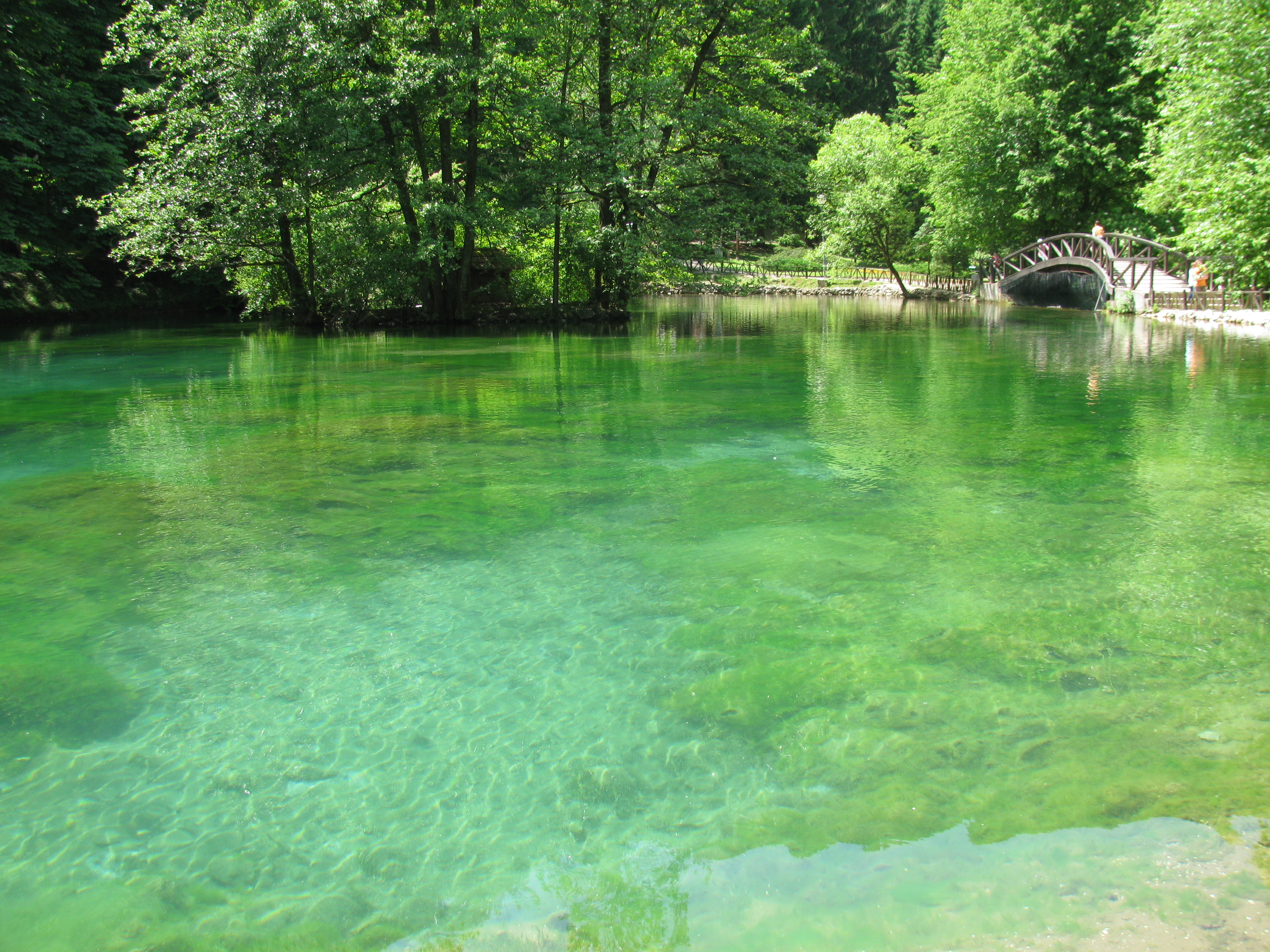
One of the ponds on Vrelo Bosne in Ilidža

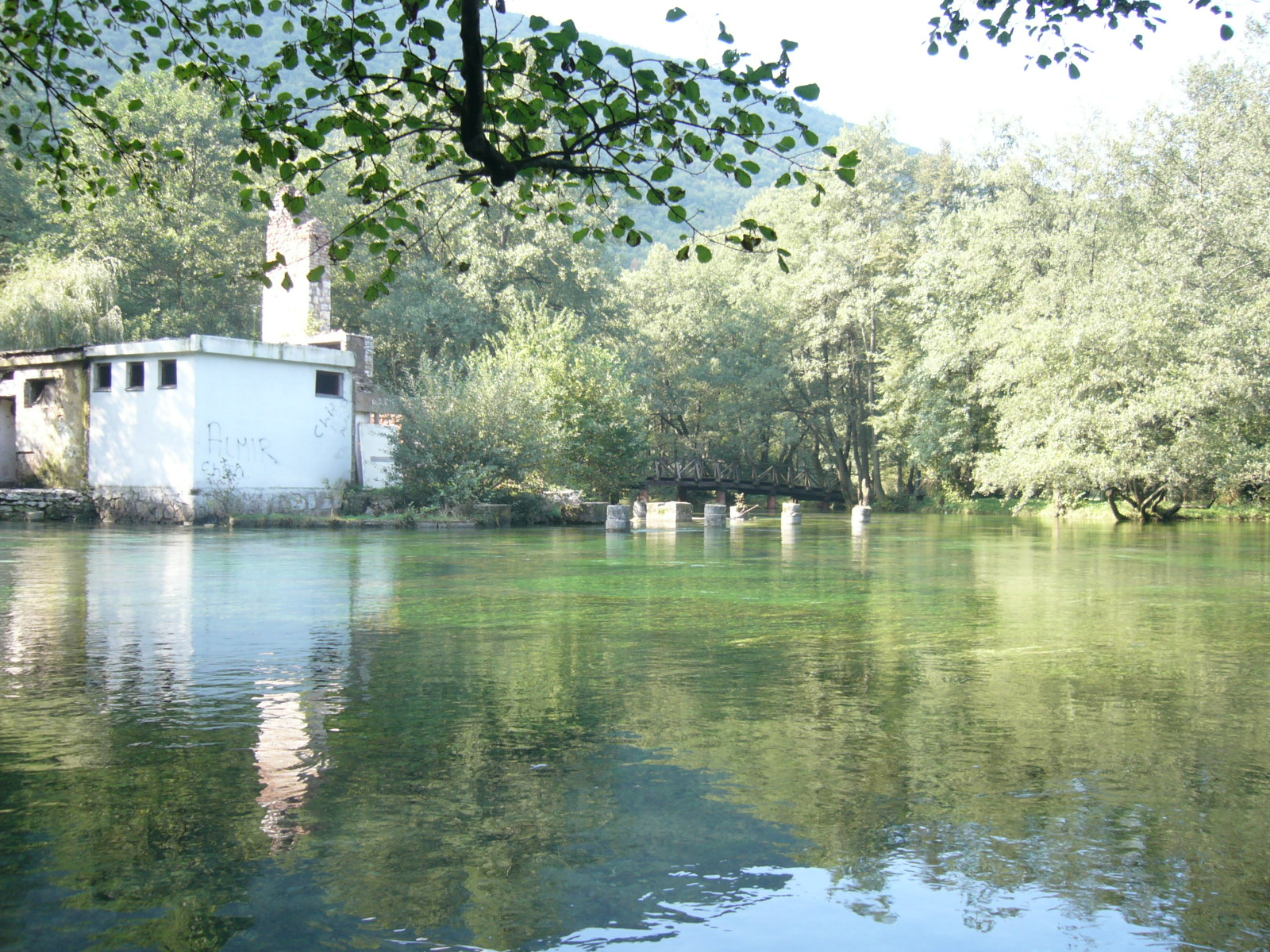
Mala Bosna river in Ilidža

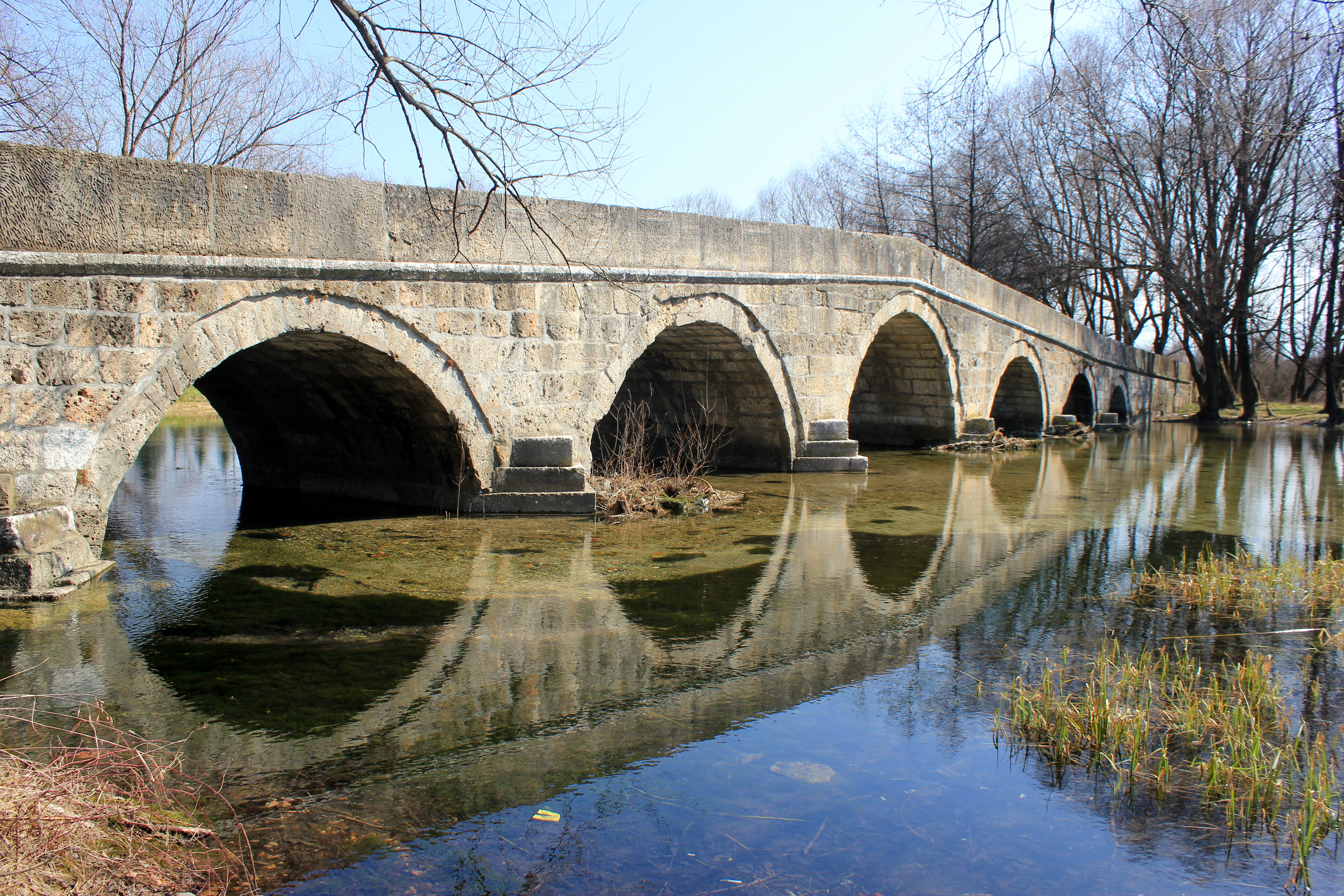
Roman bridge over Mala Bosna river in Ilidža

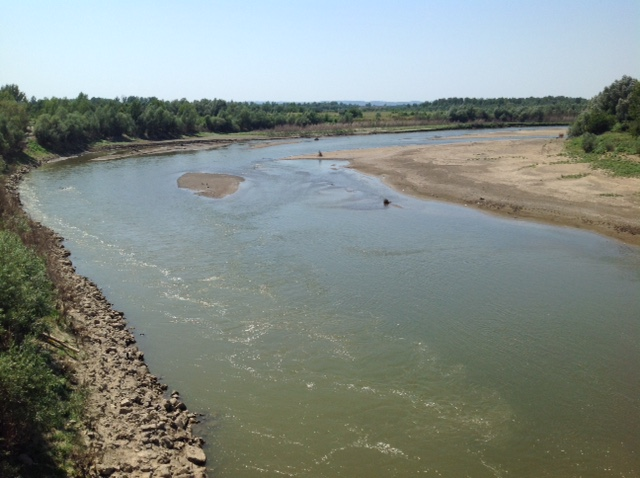
The Lower Bosna near Bosanski Šamac
