= List of settlements in the Federation of Bosnia and Herzegovina/R =

== Ra ==
Rabrani (municipality Neum), Račići, Radešine, Radići, Radijevići, Radmilovići, Radojčići Travnik, Radojevići, Radonjići Travnik, Radovovići, Ragale Fojnica, Rajetići Fojnica, Rakova Noga Kreševo, Rankovići Novi Travnik, Raotići, Rapti Bobani (municipality Ravno) (part), Rasavci Donji Vakuf, Rastičevo Donji Vakuf, Rastovci Novi Travnik, Rasvar, Raška Gora (municipality Mostar), Raškovići, Raštani (municipality Mostar), Rat Novi Travnik, Ratkovići, Ratkovići Kreševo, Rauševac Kiseljak, Ravan Busovača, Ravna, Ravni (municipality Mostar), Ravnica (municipality Prozor-Rama), Ravno, Razići

== Re ==
Redžići, Repovci, Repovica, Reput Novi Travnik, Rešetnica

== Ri ==
Ribari, Ribići, Ričice Travnik, Rijeka Vitez (BiH), Rika Jajce, Ripci (municipality Prozor-Rama), Ripići Bugojno, Risovac, Rizvići, Fojnica

== Ro ==
Rodići, Rodijelj (part), Rodoč (municipality Mostar), Ropovići, Rosijevići, Rosulje Bugojno, Rosulje Uskoplje, Rotilj Kiseljak, Rotimlja (municipality Stolac(BiH)), Rovna Bugojno

== Ru ==
Ruda Novi Travnik, Rudina (Donji Vakuf, BiH) Donji Vakuf, Rumboci (municipality Prozor-Rama), Runjići Travnik, Rupni Do (municipality Ravno), Rusanj, Ruska Pilana Donji Vakuf
