= Višnjica =

Višnjica may refer to several places:

- Višnjica, Serbia, a settlement in Palilula, Belgrade
- Višnjica (Ilijaš), a village in Bosnia and Herzegovina
- Višnjica (Kiseljak), a village in Bosnia and Herzegovina
- Višnjica, Milići, a village in Bosnia and Herzegovina
- Višnjica, Sisak-Moslavina County, a village near Jasenovac, Croatia
- Višnjica, Split-Dalmatia County, a village near Vrgorac, Croatia
- Višnjica, Virovitica-Podravina County, a village near Sopje, Croatia
- Donja Višnjica, a village near Lepoglava, Croatia
- Gornja Višnjica, a village near Lepoglava, Croatia
- Mahala Višnjica
- Polje Višnjica
- Višnjica, Montenegro
