= Stojkovići =

Stojkovići may refer to the following places in Bosnia and Herzegovina:

- Stojkovići (Foča)
- Stojkovići (Kiseljak)
- Stojkovići, Konjic
- Stojkovići, Novi Travnik
