= Radići =

Radići may refer to:

- Radići, Bosnia and Herzegovina, a village near Goražde
- Radići, Istria County, a village near Sveti Lovreč, Croatia
- Radići, Primorje-Gorski Kotar County, a village near Malinska-Dubašnica, Croatia

== See also ==
- Radić
