= Lisac, Novi Travnik =

Lisac
- Village
- Location within Bosnia and Herzegovina
- Coordinates: 44.0755907°N 17.6485999°E
- Country: Bosnia and Herzegovina
- Entity: Federation of Bosnia and Herzegovina
- Canton: Central Bosnia
- Municipality: Novi Travnik

Area
  - Total: 2.49 sq mi (6.46 km^{2})

Population (2013)
  - Total: 348
  - Density: 140/sq mi (53.9/km^{2})
- Time zone: UTC+1 (CET)
  - Summer (DST): UTC+2 (CEST)

Lisac is a village in the municipality of Novi Travnik, Bosnia and Herzegovina.

== Demographics ==
According to the 2013 census, its population was 348, all Bosniaks.
