= Kopila =

- Village
- Location within Bosnia and Herzegovina
- Coordinates: 44.1419288°N 17.5968086°E
- Country: Bosnia and Herzegovina
- Entity: Federation of Bosnia and Herzegovina
- Canton: Central Bosnia
- Municipality: Novi Travnik

Area
  - Total: 0.50 sq mi (1.30 km^{2})

Population (2013)
  - Total: 214
  - Density: 426/sq mi (165/km^{2})
- Time zone: UTC+1 (CET)
  - Summer (DST): UTC+2 (CEST)

Kopila is a village in the municipality of Novi Travnik, Bosnia and Herzegovina.

== Demographics ==
According to the 2013 census, its population was 214.

Ethnicity in 2013
Ethnicity	Number	Percentage
Bosniaks	209	97.7%
Croats	4	1.9%
other/undeclared	1	0.5%
Total	214	100%
