= Donje Pećine =

- Village
- Location within Bosnia and Herzegovina
- Coordinates: 44.1545668°N 17.5646081°E
- Country: Bosnia and Herzegovina
- Entity: Federation of Bosnia and Herzegovina
- Canton: Central Bosnia
- Municipality: Novi Travnik

Area
  - Total: 1.53 sq mi (3.95 km^{2})

Population (2013)
  - Total: 238
  - Density: 156/sq mi (60.3/km^{2})
- Time zone: UTC+1 (CET)
  - Summer (DST): UTC+2 (CEST)

Donje Pećine is a village in the municipality of Novi Travnik, Bosnia and Herzegovina.

== Demographics ==
According to the 2013 census, its population was 238.

Ethnicity in 2013
Ethnicity	Number	Percentage
Croats	235	98.7%
other/undeclared	3	1.3%
Total	238	100%
