= Trenica =

- Village
- Location within Bosnia and Herzegovina
- Coordinates: 44.1493279°N 17.6624115°E
- Country: Bosnia and Herzegovina
- Entity: Federation of Bosnia and Herzegovina
- Canton: Central Bosnia
- Municipality: Novi Travnik

Area
  - Total: 0.20 sq mi (0.53 km^{2})

Population (2013)
  - Total: 373
  - Density: 1,800/sq mi (700/km^{2})
- Time zone: UTC+1 (CET)
  - Summer (DST): UTC+2 (CEST)

Trenica is a village in the municipality of Novi Travnik, Bosnia and Herzegovina.

== Demographics ==
According to the 2013 census, its population was 373.

Ethnicity in 2013
Ethnicity	Number	Percentage
Bosniaks	291	78.0%
Croats	81	21.7%
other/undeclared	1	0.3%
Total	373	100%
