= Clus (disambiguation) =

Clus may refer to Cluj-Napoca, a city in Cluj County, Romania.

Clus may also refer to:

- Clus Abbey, a former abbey in Bad Gandersheim, Lower Saxony, Germany
- Clus or Napoca (castra), a Roman fort in the province of Dacia
