= Vejzovići =

- Village
- Location within Bosnia and Herzegovina
- Coordinates: 44.160539°N 17.5985976°E
- Country: Bosnia and Herzegovina
- Entity: Federation of Bosnia and Herzegovina
- Canton: Central Bosnia
- Municipality: Novi Travnik

Area
  - Total: 0.51 sq mi (1.32 km^{2})

Population (2013)
  - Total: 152
  - Density: 298/sq mi (115/km^{2})
- Time zone: UTC+1 (CET)
  - Summer (DST): UTC+2 (CEST)

Vejzovići is a village in the municipality of Novi Travnik, Bosnia and Herzegovina.

== Demographics ==
According to the 2013 census, its population was 152, all Bosniaks.
