= Isakovići =

- Village
- Location within Bosnia and Herzegovina
- Coordinates: 44.1720°N 17.6307°E
- Country: Bosnia and Herzegovina
- Entity: Federation of Bosnia and Herzegovina
- Canton: Central Bosnia
- Municipality: Novi Travnik

Area
  - Total: 0.22 sq mi (0.58 km^{2})

Population (2013)
  - Total: 211
  - Density: 940/sq mi (360/km^{2})
- Time zone: UTC+1 (CET)
  - Summer (DST): UTC+2 (CEST)

Isakovići is a village in the municipality of Novi Travnik, Bosnia and Herzegovina.

== Demographics ==
According to the 2013 census, its population was 211.

Ethnicity in 2013
| Ethnicity | Number | Percentage |
|---|---|---|
| Bosniaks | 208 | 98.6% |
| other/undeclared | 3 | 1.4% |
| Total | 211 | 100% |
