= Cizmar =

The surnames: Cizmar/Cismar/Chizmar/Chismar (English), Čižmár/Čižmárova (f.) (Slovak), Čižmář/Čižmárová (f.) (Czech), Чижмар/Чижмарова (f.)/Чизмар/Чизмарова (f.) (Pannonian Rusyn), Ciżmar (Polish), Čizmar/Чизмар (Serbian), Čizmar (Bosnian), Čizmar/Čižmar (Croatian), Csizmar (Hungarian), Čižman (Slovenian), Cizmar/Cismar (Romanian) and Cizmar/Cismar (German) have two possible origins:

- toponymic origin, coming from Cismar near Grömitz, Schleswig-Holstein, Germany as well as Čizma in Bosnia Herzegovina;
- occupational origin, literally meaning 'shoemaker, cobbler' in Hungarian, Romanian, and Slavic languages.

Both meanings are derived from the word čizma (and variants in other languages) meaning 'high boot', borrowed from Ottoman Turkish چزمه‌جی (çizme). The Slavic suffix -ar corresponds to English -er.

Notable people with the surname include:

- Boris Čizmar, Serbian futsal player
- Albin Čižman, Slovenian slalom canoer
- Tomaž Čižman, Slovenian alpine skier
- Miloš Čižmář (cs), Czech archaeologist
- Josef Čižmář (cs), Czech folklorist
- Joseph von Zhishman (birth name Josip/Jožef Čižman), Austrian lawyer
- Maria Mirabela Cismaru, Romanian singer
- Paula Cizmar, American academic, playwright and librettist
- Richard Chizmar, American writer, publisher and editor.
- Valérie Čižmárová (1952–2005), Czech singer of Slovak origin

== See also ==
- Cismar Abbey
