= Runjić =

Runjić is a Croatian surname.

Notable people with the name include:

- Anđelko Runjić (1938–2015), Croatian politician, economist and diplomat
- Zdenko Runjić (1942–2004), Croatian songwriter

== See also ==
- Runjići
