= Petačići =

- Village
- Location within Bosnia and Herzegovina
- Coordinates: 44.1344231°N 17.6396026°E
- Country: Bosnia and Herzegovina
- Entity: Federation of Bosnia and Herzegovina
- Canton: Central Bosnia
- Municipality: Novi Travnik

Area
  - Total: 2.15 sq mi (5.57 km^{2})

Population (2013)
  - Total: 243
  - Density: 113/sq mi (43.6/km^{2})
- Time zone: UTC+1 (CET)
  - Summer (DST): UTC+2 (CEST)

Petačići is a village in the municipality of Novi Travnik, Bosnia and Herzegovina.

== Demographics ==
According to the 2013 census, its population was 243, all Bosniaks.
