= Kasapovići, Novi Travnik =

Kasapovići
- Village
- Location within Bosnia and Herzegovina
- Coordinates: 44.173358°N 17.6264248°E
- Country: Bosnia and Herzegovina
- Entity: Federation of Bosnia and Herzegovina
- Canton: Central Bosnia
- Municipality: Novi Travnik

Area
  - Total: 1.76 sq mi (4.56 km^{2})

Population (2013)
  - Total: 494
  - Density: 281/sq mi (108/km^{2})
- Time zone: UTC+1 (CET)
  - Summer (DST): UTC+2 (CEST)

Kasapovići is a village in the municipality of Novi Travnik, Bosnia and Herzegovina.

== Demographics ==
According to the 2013 census, its population was 494.

Ethnicity in 2013
Ethnicity	Number	Percentage
Bosniaks	470	95.1%
Croats	13	2.6%
Serbs	1	0.2%
other/undeclared	10	2.0%
Total	494	100%
