= Pričani =

- Village
- Location within Bosnia and Herzegovina
- Coordinates: 44.0711256°N 17.6423836°E
- Country: Bosnia and Herzegovina
- Entity: Federation of Bosnia and Herzegovina
- Canton: Central Bosnia
- Municipality: Novi Travnik

Area
  - Total: 3.94 sq mi (10.21 km^{2})

Population (2013)
  - Total: 359
  - Density: 91.1/sq mi (35.2/km^{2})
- Time zone: UTC+1 (CET)
  - Summer (DST): UTC+2 (CEST)

Pričani is a village in the municipality of Novi Travnik, Bosnia and Herzegovina.

== Demographics ==
According to the 2013 census, its population was 359.

Ethnicity in 2013
Ethnicity	Number	Percentage
Bosniaks	353	98.3%
other/undeclared	6	1.7%
Total	359	100%
