= Dahovo =

- Village
- Location within Bosnia and Herzegovina
- Coordinates: 44.0541086°N 17.6876375°E
- Country: Bosnia and Herzegovina
- Entity: Federation of Bosnia and Herzegovina
- Canton: Central Bosnia
- Municipality: Novi Travnik

Area
  - Total: 1.53 sq mi (3.96 km^{2})

Population (2013)
  - Total: 10
  - Density: 6.5/sq mi (2.5/km^{2})
- Time zone: UTC+1 (CET)
  - Summer (DST): UTC+2 (CEST)

Dahovo is a village in the municipality of Novi Travnik, Bosnia and Herzegovina.

== Demographics ==
According to the 2013 census, its population was 10, all Bosniaks.
