= Kazagići =

Kazagići may refer to:

- Kazagići (Goražde)
- Kazagići (Kiseljak)
