= Schack von Staffeldt =

Danish poet (1769–1826)

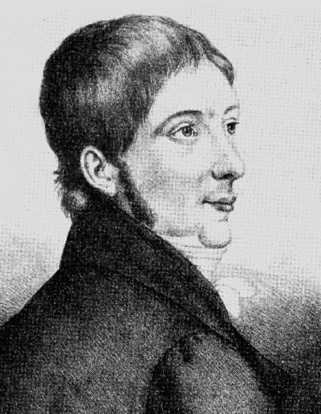
Schack von Staffeldt

Schack von Staffeldt (28 March 1769 – 28 December 1826) or Adolph Wilhelm Schack von Staffeldt was a Danish author of two collections of poetry. He is famous for "being late", publishing his collection of poetry intended to introduce Romanticism in Denmark a year after his younger rival, Adam Oehlenschläger did it. Staffeldt was not held in high regard in his own time but is acknowledged as one of the most important Romantic Danish poets by later generations.

== Life and career ==
Staffeldt was born in Gartz on Rügen in 1769. The son of an immigrant German, he had hoped to be the first to introduce the dawning German Romanticism in Danish literature. Staffeldt underwent a military education at the cadet academy but one of his teachers, W. H. F. Abrahamson stirred the young man's interest in literature. As a lieutenant he studied at the Georg-August Universität in Göttingen in 1791–1793. After a few years back in Denmark, he travelled again, seeking inspiration from prominent philosophers such as Herder, Schiller, Kant, and Schelling. He was thus well prepared for his literary breakthrough but Adam Oehlenschläger, who was ten years younger and had an intuitive talent for literature, published a Romanticist collection before Staffeldt was able to do it. When his collection came out a year later, he was deemed an epigone. Furthermore, Staffeldt was critical of Norse mythology which he thought of as a puppet play, a stance which did not help ensure a favourable reception either.

Unlike his younger rival, Staffeldt did, however, demonstrate a deeper understanding of Romanticist philosophy and a strong ability to turn the idea of a fundamental split between ideas and phenomena into what is, according to Brandes, poetry of "imperishable beauty". Staffeldt's German origins were noted in the nationalist atmosphere in the middle of the 19th century but as Brandes noted: "we Danes should not blame Staffeldt for preferring our language to his own".

Staffeldt is a philosophical poet but the poems in his second collection, Nye Digte (1808, literally: New Poems) are also full of observations of the natural surroundings. The book did, however, not receive much attention and Staffeldt gave up poetry to work as a prefect in the duchies. He worked in Cismar from 1810 and was appointed in Schleswig in 1813 where he died in 1826.

He only published poetry but did also work as a playwright. His plays just needed the "final touch of Donatello's chisel", he noted. Staffeldt was reassessed by J. L. Heiberg and Georg Brandes who despite antipathy towards Romanticism understood and valued Staffeldt's contributions. In 2006, Staffeldt's poem, "Indvielsen" (The Initiation) was included in the Danish Culture Canon.
