= Bursfelde Congregation =

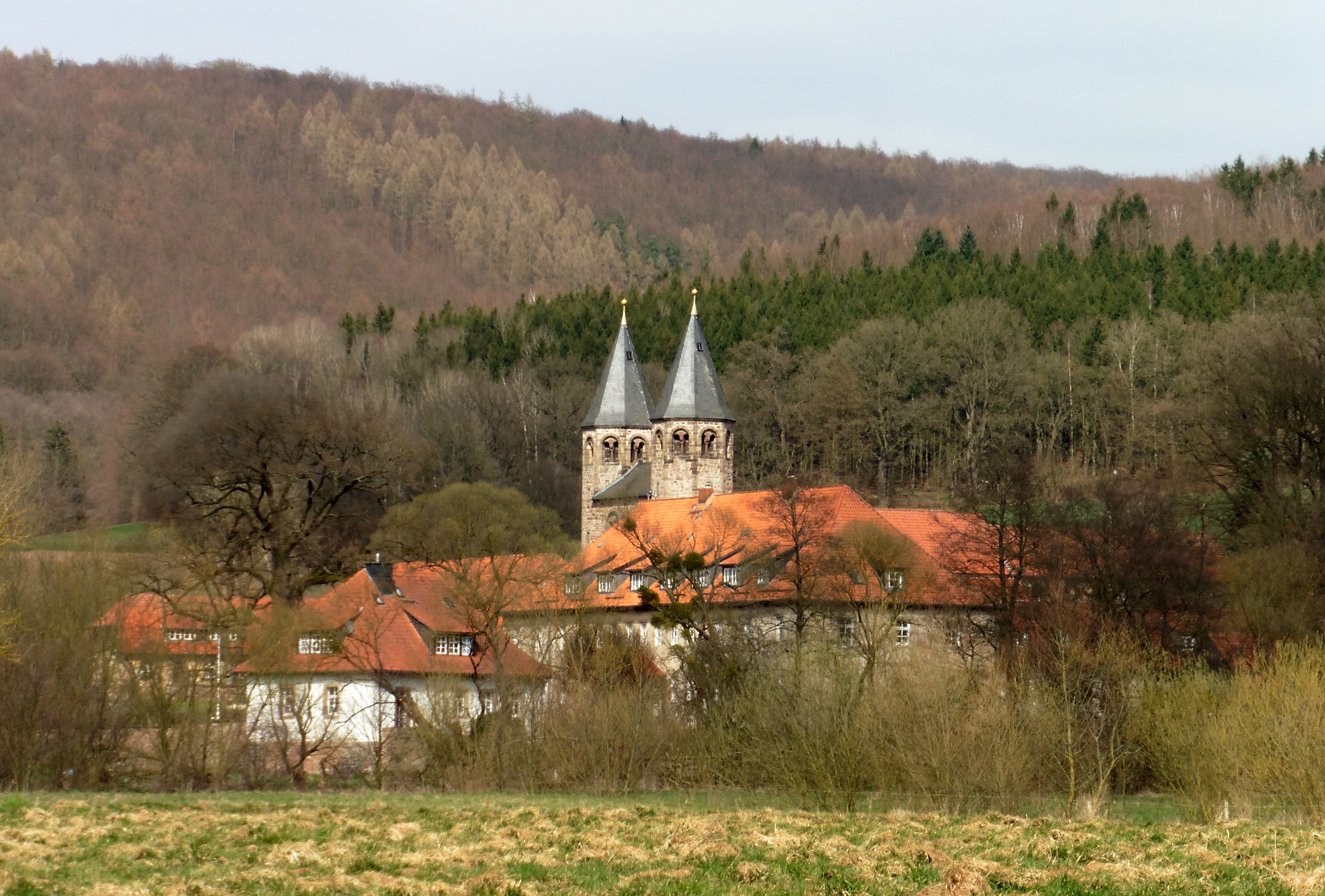
Bursfelde Kirche

The Bursfelde Congregation, also called Bursfelde Union, was a union of predominantly west and central German Benedictine monasteries, of both men and women, working for the reform of Benedictine practice. Named after Bursfelde Abbey, it included over 100 monasteries in middle Europe.

== Background ==
During the 15th century there was a movement for monastic and other ecclesiastical reforms throughout Europe. One of the first Benedictine reformers was John Dederoth of Nordheim. After effecting notable reforms at Clus Abbey, where he had been abbot since 1430, Dederoth was persuaded by Duke Otto of Brunswick in 1433 to reform the extremely neglected and dilapidated Bursfelde Abbey after the previous abbot had resigned in despair. Obtaining four exemplary monks from St. Matthias' Abbey in Trier, he assigned two of them to Clus to maintain his reformed discipline there, while the other two went with him to Bursfelde. As abbot of Clus, he was able to recruit from that community for Bursfelde. Dederoth succeeded beyond expectations in the restoration of Bursfelde and began the reform of Reinhausen Abbey near Göttingen but died on 6 February 1439, before his efforts in that quarter had borne fruit.

== The Bursfelde Congregation ==
Although the monasteries reformed by him never united into a congregation, Dederoth's reforms may be looked upon as the foundation of the Bursfelde Congregation. Dederoth had intended to unite the reformed Benedictine monasteries of Northern Germany under a stricter uniformity of discipline, but the execution of his plan was left to his successor, Johannes de Indagine.

In 1445 Johannes de Indagine obtained permission from the Council of Basel to restore the Divine Office to the original form of the old Benedictine breviary and to introduce liturgical and disciplinary uniformity in the monasteries that followed the reform of Bursfelde. A year later, on 11 March 1446, Louis d'Allemand, as Cardinal Legate authorized by the Council of Basel, approved the Bursfelde Congregation, which then consisted of six abbeys: Bursfelde, Clus, Reinhausen, Cismar in Schleswig-Holstein, St. Jacob's Abbey near Mainz, and Huysburg near Magdeburg. The cardinal likewise decreed that the Abbot of Bursfelde should always ex officio be one of the three presidents of the congregation, and that he should have power to convoke annual chapters. The first annual chapter of the Bursfelde Congregation convened in the Abbey of Sts. Peter and Paul at Erfurt in 1446.

In 1451, while on his journey of reform through Germany, the papal legate, Cardinal Nicholas of Cusa, met Johannes de Indagine at Würzburg, where the Benedictine monasteries of the Mainz-Bamberg province held their triennial provincial chapter. The legate appointed the Abbot of Bursfelde visitor for this province, and in a bull, dated 7 June 1451, the Bursfelde Congregation was approved, and favoured with new privileges. Finally, on 6 March 1458, Pope Pius II approved the statutes of the congregation and gave it all the privileges which Pope Eugene IV had given to the Italian Benedictine Congregation of St. Justina since the year 1431. In 1461 this approbation was reiterated, and various new privileges granted to the congregation.

Favoured by bishops, cardinals, and popes, as well as by temporal rulers, especially the Dukes of Brunswick, the Bursfelde Congregation was influential during the second half of the fifteenth century and first half of the sixteenth century to promote reform in the Benedictine monasteries of Germany. Under the influence of Jan Busch and Nicholas of Cusa, the reform spread to Benedictine monasteries in Belgium, Luxembourg, the Netherlands and Denmark.

At the death of Abbot Johannes de Indagine, thirty-six monasteries had already joined the Bursfelde Congregation, and new ones were being added every year. At its peak, shortly before the Reformation, at least 136 abbeys and 64 convents, scattered through all parts of Germany, belonged to the Bursfelde Congregation.

The reforms were not entirely supported by all Benedictine houses, including some members of the Bursfelde Congregation. At issue was the prohibition against eating meat, a provision of St. Benedict's rule. Those who preferred a relaxation of the rule argued that fish was not always easy to come by, and that the monasteries were losing well-qualified potential candidates to orders with less stringent requirements. Papal directives to adhere to the rule were widely ignored, or an exception pled. In 1570 the General Chapter allowed meat at dinner three times a week, except during Advent and Lent.

== Reformation ==
The religious revolution, and especially the consequent risings of the peasants in Germany, greatly inhibited the progress of the Bursfelde Reform. In 1579, Andrew Lüderitz, the last abbot of Bursfelde, was driven out by the Lutheran Duke Julius of Brunswick, and, after an existence of almost five hundred years, Bursfeld ceased to be a Catholic monastery. The possessions of the abbey were confiscated, and the abbot was replaced by a Lutheran abbot.

About forty other Benedictine abbeys belonging to the Bursfelde Congregation were also dissolved, their possessions confiscated by Lutheran princes, and their churches demolished or turned to Protestant uses. In 1630 the Bursfelde Congregation granted the English Benedictines in exile the derelict buildings at Lamspringe Abbey, which continued as an abbey of English monks from 1644 to 1802. Though greatly impeded in its work of reform, the Bursfelde Congregation continued to exist until the compulsory secularization of all its monasteries at the end of the eighteenth, and the beginning of the nineteenth, century. Its last president was Bernard Bierbaum, abbot of Werden Abbey in the Rhine Province, who died in 1798. The Congregation was formally abolished in 1803.
