= Sinokos =

- Village
- Location within Bosnia and Herzegovina
- Coordinates: 44.1461602°N 17.5919555°E
- Country: Bosnia and Herzegovina
- Entity: Federation of Bosnia and Herzegovina
- Canton: Central Bosnia
- Municipality: Novi Travnik

Area
  - Total: 0.58 sq mi (1.49 km^{2})

Population (2013)
  - Total: 451
  - Density: 784/sq mi (303/km^{2})
- Time zone: UTC+1 (CET)
  - Summer (DST): UTC+2 (CEST)

Sinokos is a village in the municipality of Novi Travnik, Bosnia and Herzegovina.

== Demographics ==
According to the 2013 census, its population was 451, all Bosniaks.
