= Ðakovići =

- Village
- Location within Bosnia and Herzegovina
- Coordinates: 44.1876392°N 17.6038089°E
- Country: Bosnia and Herzegovina
- Entity: Federation of Bosnia and Herzegovina
- Canton: Central Bosnia
- Municipality: Novi Travnik

Area
  - Total: 2.31 sq mi (5.97 km^{2})

Population (2013)
  - Total: 20
  - Density: 8.7/sq mi (3.4/km^{2})
- Time zone: UTC+1 (CET)
  - Summer (DST): UTC+2 (CEST)

Ðakovići is a village in the municipality of Novi Travnik, Bosnia and Herzegovina.

== Demographics ==
According to the 2013 census, its population was 20.

Ethnicity in 2013
Ethnicity	Number	Percentage
Croats	19	95.0%
Bosniaks	1	5.0%
Total	20	100%
