= Vodovod =

- Village
- Location within Bosnia and Herzegovina
- Coordinates: 44.1462219°N 17.6046549°E
- Country: Bosnia and Herzegovina
- Entity: Federation of Bosnia and Herzegovina
- Canton: Central Bosnia
- Municipality: Novi Travnik

Area
  - Total: 0.081 sq mi (0.21 km^{2})

Population (2013)
  - Total: 49
  - Density: 600/sq mi (230/km^{2})
- Time zone: UTC+1 (CET)
  - Summer (DST): UTC+2 (CEST)

Vodovod is a village in the municipality of Novi Travnik, Bosnia and Herzegovina.

== Demographics ==
According to the 2013 census, its population was 49.

Ethnicity in 2013
Ethnicity	Number	Percentage
Bosniaks	44	89.8%
Croats	5	10.2%
Total	49	100%
