= Nova Opara =

- Village
- Location within Bosnia and Herzegovina
- Coordinates: 44.0962319°N 17.6406374°E
- Country: Bosnia and Herzegovina
- Entity: Federation of Bosnia and Herzegovina
- Canton: Central Bosnia
- Municipality: Novi Travnik

Area
  - Total: 0.12 sq mi (0.32 km^{2})

Population (2013)
  - Total: 216
  - Density: 1,700/sq mi (670/km^{2})
- Time zone: UTC+1 (CET)
  - Summer (DST): UTC+2 (CEST)

Nova Opara is a village in the municipality of Novi Travnik, Bosnia and Herzegovina.

== Demographics ==
According to the 2013 census, its population was 216.

Ethnicity in 2013
Ethnicity	Number	Percentage
Bosniaks	210	97.2%
Serbs	6	2.8%
Total	216	100%
