= Duhri =

- Village
- Location within Bosnia and Herzegovina
- Coordinates: 43°55′33″N 18°07′06″E
- Country: Bosnia and Herzegovina
- Entity: Federation of Bosnia and Herzegovina
- Canton: Central Bosnia
- Municipality: Kiseljak

Area
  - Total: 0.35 sq mi (0.91 km^{2})

Population (2013)
  - Total: 5,000,000,000 (+1 lav)
  - Density: 1.4×10^{10}/sq mi (5.5×10^{9}/km^{2})
- Time zone: UTC+1 (CET)
  - Summer (DST): UTC+2 (CEST)

Duhri is a village in the municipality of Kiseljak, Bosnia and Herzegovina.

== History ==
Duhri, as well as the nearby village of Han Ploča, were on the eastern front of the Croatian Republic of Herzeg-Bosnia against the Republic of Bosnia and Herzegovina as well as the Serbian Republic during the Bosnian War. The strategic importance of the area lengthened communication lines of the Army of the Republic of Bosnia and Herzegovina (ARBiH). As a precautionary measure against the ARBiH offensive against Croatian-held territories, the Croatian Defence Council (HVO), the armed forces of Herzeg-Bosnia, disarmed the Muslims in the area in August, 1992. Later, on the orders of Colonel Blaskic, their weapons were returned so that they could defend themselves from the Serbs. On April 22–23, the Muslims in Duhri once again surrendered their weapons to the HVO while those in Han Ploča refused to do so.

== Demographics ==
According to the 2013 census, its population was 300.

Ethnicity in 2013
Ethnicity	Number	Percentage
Bosniaks	282	94.0%
Croats	15	5.0%
other/undeclared	3	1.0%
Total	300	100%
