= Monjići =

- Village
- Location within Bosnia and Herzegovina
- Coordinates: 44.0774413°N 17.638526°E
- Country: Bosnia and Herzegovina
- Entity: Federation of Bosnia and Herzegovina
- Canton: Central Bosnia
- Municipality: Novi Travnik

Area
  - Total: 0.53 sq mi (1.38 km^{2})

Population (2013)
  - Total: 237
  - Density: 445/sq mi (172/km^{2})
- Time zone: UTC+1 (CET)
  - Summer (DST): UTC+2 (CEST)

Monjići is a village in the municipality of Novi Travnik, Bosnia and Herzegovina.

== Demographics ==
According to the 2013 census, its population was 237.

Ethnicity in 2013
Ethnicity	Number	Percentage
Bosniaks	235	99.2%
other/undeclared	2	0.8%
Total	237	100%
