= Pečuj, Novi Travnik =

Pečuj
- Village
- Location within Bosnia and Herzegovina
- Coordinates: 44.1506263°N 17.6419781°E
- Country: Bosnia and Herzegovina
- Entity: Federation of Bosnia and Herzegovina
- Canton: Central Bosnia
- Municipality: Novi Travnik

Area
  - Total: 0.76 sq mi (1.97 km^{2})

Population (2013)
  - Total: 561
  - Density: 738/sq mi (285/km^{2})
- Time zone: UTC+1 (CET)
  - Summer (DST): UTC+2 (CEST)

Pečuj is a village in the municipality of Novi Travnik, Bosnia and Herzegovina.

== Demographics ==
According to the 2013 census, its population was 561.

Ethnicity in 2013
Ethnicity	Number	Percentage
Bosniaks	559	99.6%
Croats	1	0.2%
other/undeclared	1	0.2%
Total	561	100%
