= Torine =

- Village
- Location within Bosnia and Herzegovina
- Coordinates: 44.1444521°N 17.6083162°E
- Country: Bosnia and Herzegovina
- Entity: Federation of Bosnia and Herzegovina
- Canton: Central Bosnia
- Municipality: Novi Travnik

Area
  - Total: 1.80 sq mi (4.65 km^{2})

Population (2013)
  - Total: 192
  - Density: 107/sq mi (41.3/km^{2})
- Time zone: UTC+1 (CET)
  - Summer (DST): UTC+2 (CEST)

Torine is a village in the municipality of Novi Travnik, Bosnia and Herzegovina.

== Demographics ==
According to the 2013 census, its population was 192.

Ethnicity in 2013
Ethnicity	Number	Percentage
Bosniaks	183	95.3%
Croats	9	4.7%
Total	192	100%
