= Krnjića Potok =

- Village
- Location within Bosnia and Herzegovina
- Coordinates: 44.1461781°N 17.6297921°E
- Country: Bosnia and Herzegovina
- Entity: Federation of Bosnia and Herzegovina
- Canton: Central Bosnia
- Municipality: Novi Travnik

Area
  - Total: 0.19 sq mi (0.48 km^{2})

Population (2013)
  - Total: 193
  - Density: 1,000/sq mi (400/km^{2})
- Time zone: UTC+1 (CET)
  - Summer (DST): UTC+2 (CEST)

Krnjića Potok is a village in the municipality of Novi Travnik, Bosnia and Herzegovina.

== Demographics ==
According to the 2013 census, its population was 193, all Bosniaks.
