= Devetaci =

Devetaci may refer to:

- Devetaci (Novi Grad), a village in Bosnia and Herzegovina
- Devetaci (Kiseljak), a village in Bosnia and Herzegovina
