= Pribilovići =

- Village
- Location within Bosnia and Herzegovina
- Coordinates: 44.1798256°N 17.6455204°E
- Country: Bosnia and Herzegovina
- Entity: Federation of Bosnia and Herzegovina
- Canton: Central Bosnia
- Municipality: Novi Travnik

Area
  - Total: 1.87 sq mi (4.85 km^{2})

Population (2013)
  - Total: 364
  - Density: 194/sq mi (75.1/km^{2})
- Time zone: UTC+1 (CET)
  - Summer (DST): UTC+2 (CEST)

Pribilovići is a village in the municipality of Novi Travnik, Bosnia and Herzegovina.

== Demographics ==
According to the 2013 census, its population was 364.

Ethnicity in 2013
Ethnicity	Number	Percentage
Croats	263	72.3%
Bosniaks	98	26.9%
Serbs	1	0.3%
other/undeclared	2	0.5%
Total	364	100%
