= Bursfelde Abbey =

Former abbey of Saint Benedict in Bursfelde in Lower Saxony, Germany

Coordinates: 51°32′30″N 9°37′29″E

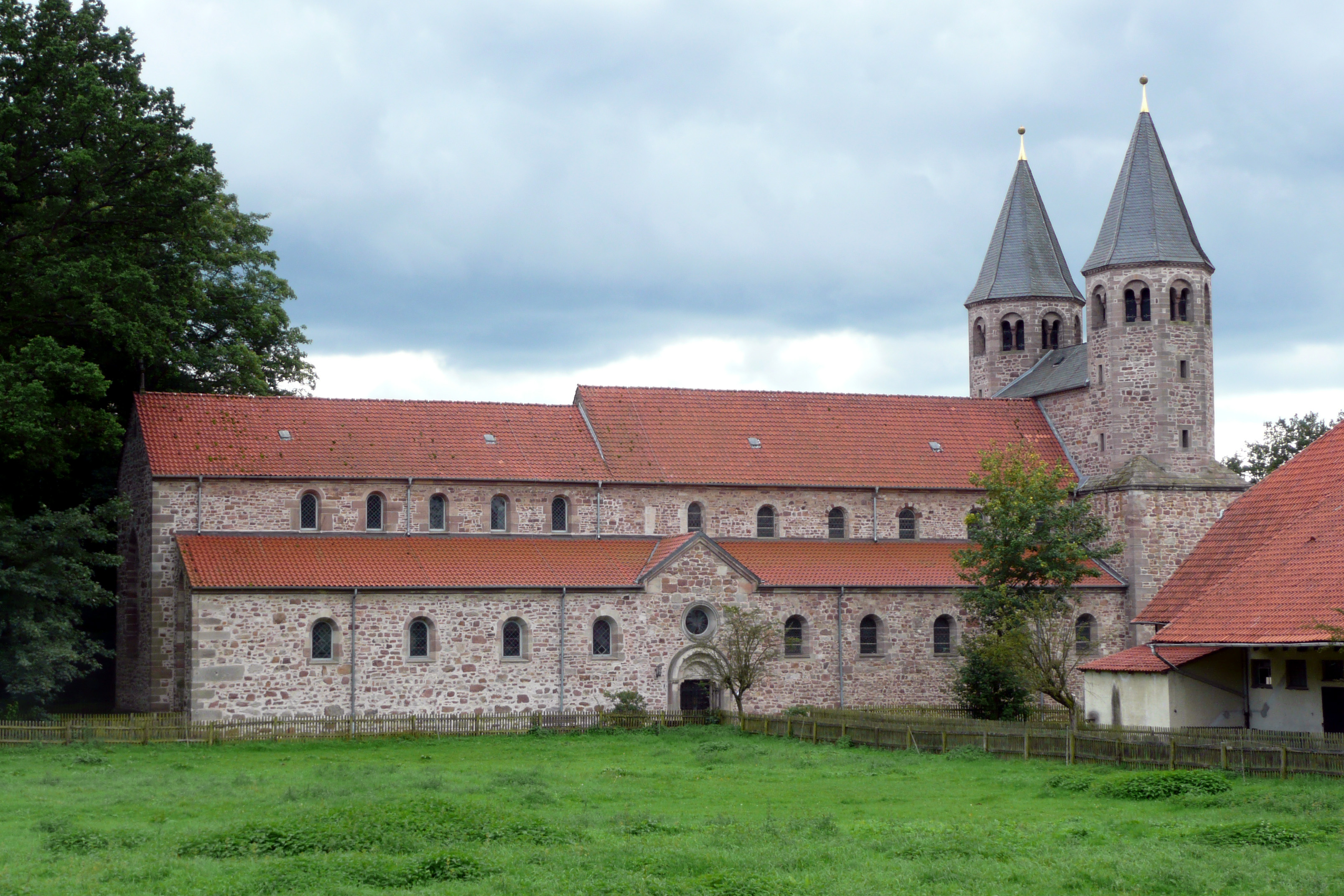
- Bursfelde Abbey in 2010 showing the church
- Interactive map of Bursfelde Abbey

Monastery information
- Order: Benedictine
- Established: 1093
- Disestablished: 1579
- Mother house: Corvey Abbey

People
- Founder: Heinrich of Northeim

Site
- Location: Bursfelde, Lower Saxony, Germany
- Visible remains: only the church, new towers were built in the 19th century
- Public access: yes

Bursfelde Abbey (in German Kloster Bursfelde) is a former Benedictine monastery located in Bursfelde, a hamlet which for administrative purposes is included in the municipality of nearby Hannoversch Münden in Lower Saxony, Germany. Today the abbey church and its estate cover a site of approximately 300 hectares which is administered by the Klosterkammer Hannover, a body that operates under the auspices of the Lower Saxony Ministry for Arts and the Sciences to look after reassigned or disused ecclesiastical buildings and other heritage properties in the region. The legal owner of the Bursfelde Monastery Complex ("Zentrums Kloster Bursfelde") is the Evangelical-Lutheran Church of Hanover.

== History ==
The abbey was founded in 1093 by Count Heinrich the Fat of Northeim and his wife Gertrude so that the members of noble families from the area might be buried in a place with monks permanently in attendance. Archbishop Ruthard of Mainz participated in the foundation. The first monks came from Corvey Abbey: a close association between the two foundations would endure. In 1102 the founder, who had been killed by invading Frisians, was himself buried in the abbey church. The late eleventh century was a period of monastic and ecclesiastical reform, and from the outset Bursfelde was influenced by the new ideas coming out of Cluny and Hirsau. Although one motive for the abbey's foundation was clearly that the souls of the faithful departed kinsfolk of the founder might be properly prayed for, the founder's dynastic ambitions and the pressures of the church reform movement also played their part. Emperor Henry IV granted Bursfelde numerous privileges and immunities. Following the Benedictine tradition, Almeric, the first abbot, opened a school, which soon became famous. Under the next four abbots its fame continued to increase.

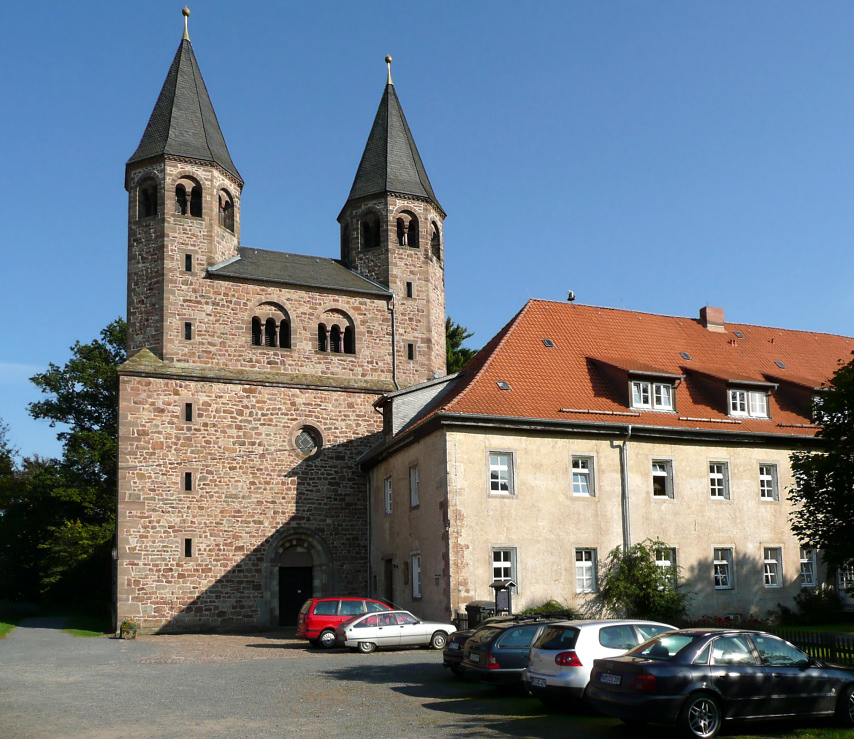
The West End of the Abbey Church 2010

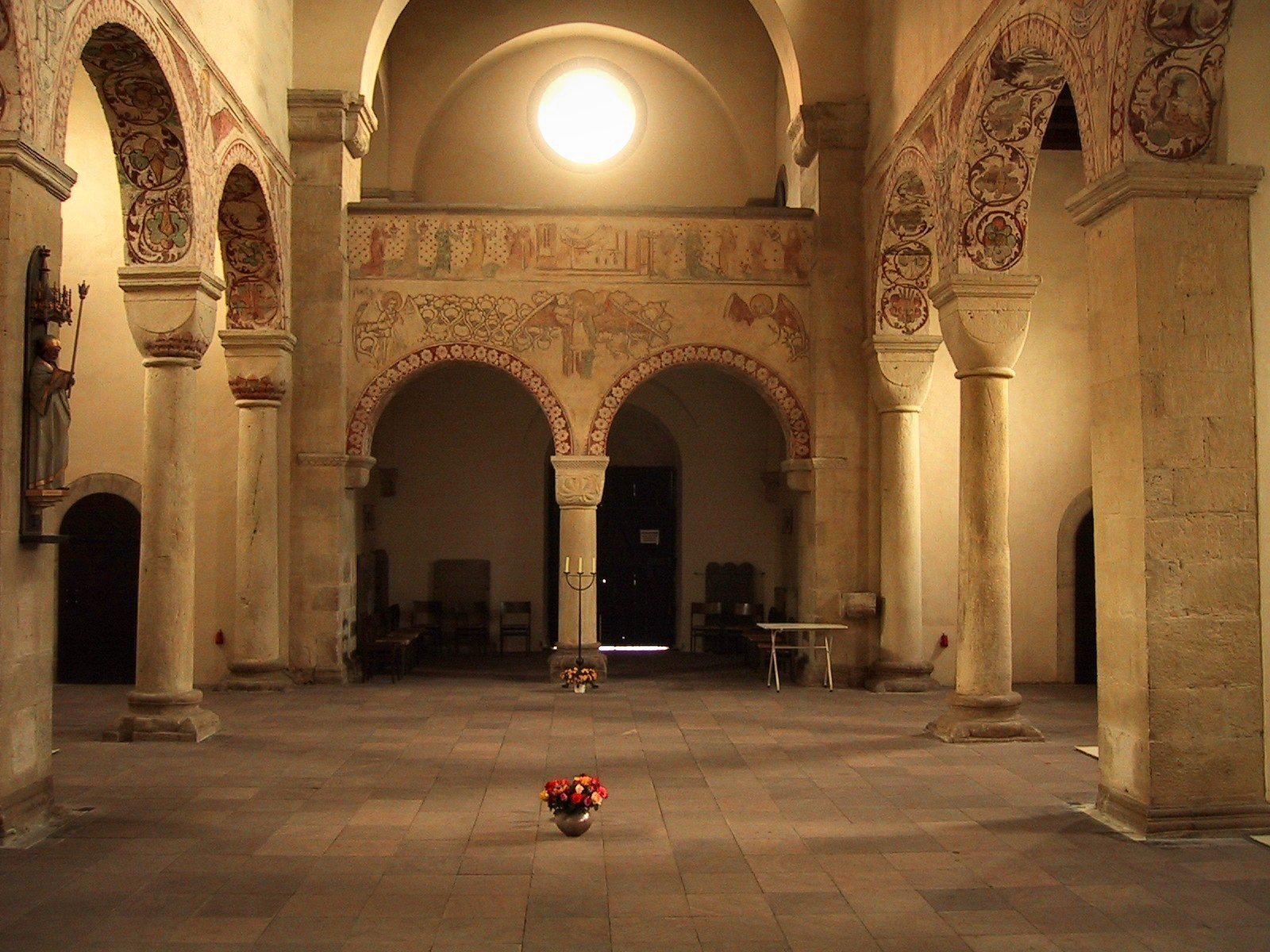
The West End of the Abbey Church (interior) 2002

The abbey complex was created on the Miminde estate, which the founder had inherited from Albert von Gieselwerder. The site lay at the confluence of the Rivers Nieme and Weser. Henry's father, Otto of Nordheim, had previously erected the Bramburg fortress a couple of kilometers upriver, which provided a measure of protection. In line with the ideals of the still influential monastic reform movement, and with the backing of Archbishop Ruthard of Mainz it was established that abbots should be freely elected. The same level of trust did not extend to the abbey's more temporal interests however: bailiffs were to be appointed in perpetuity by the counts of Northeim. There was to be no political autonomy, given the continuing legal and military dependence channeled through the bailiffs. The granting of market and currency rights to the monastery nevertheless appears to have been part of the founder's strategy for building up the territorial power of the Northeim family in the area.

It would be wrong to overstate the economic importance of the foundation. The emphasis in the Benedictine monastery was less on craftwork or agriculture, and more on scientific research and teaching. In 1101 Henry was killed in Frisia. His body was returned to Bursfelde and buried on 10 April 1101 in the foundations of what later became the abbey's "west church" ("Westkirche"). Subsequently, in 1115, his widow, the three-times-married Gertrude of Brunswick, founded the Abbey of Saint-Gilles at Braunschweig, which was subordinated to the Abbot of Bursfelde. Links between the two foundations would remain close. A further significant development came in 1135 when the founder's daughter, Richenza (whose husband Lothar of Supplingenburg, had become Holy Roman Emperor in 1133) arranged for the construction of the abbey's great "East Choir" ("Ost-Chor"). The Northeims were determined to stamp their mark on Bursfelde.

In 1144 Bursfelde Abbey passed to the control of Henry the Lion, Duke of Saxony (1139) and later also of Bavaria (1156), following the death of Siegfried IV, a grandson of Otto of Nordheim who had died without male issue. Henry the Lion confirmed the rights of the Abbey, following the presentation of a falsified foundation record. The absence of male heirs in the Northeim family meant that the County of Northeim, including Bursfelde Abbey, now passed to the Guelfs. Henry the Lion reduced his rights over the abbey to rights of patronage and jurisdiction.

By this time the diminishing impact of the Benedictine reform movement in general and of its inmpct at Bursfelde Abbey in particular meant that control over Bursfelde was of reduced importance in terms of the political power politics of the great families in the region. After the ending of the Investiture Controversy the Benedictine reform movement had rapidly lost impetus. During the same period the Cistercian monks had gained in kudos with an ascetic lifestyle which left the Benedictines appearing relatively worldly. Later on rivalries were complicated by the increased prominence of the Mendicant orders. Nevertheless, even when Bursfelde features less prominently in the records by the end of the twelfth century, by around 1200 it had major land holdings, with fourteen farming estates, although these were widely dispersed, with holdings as far to the south as Erfurt and as far to the west as Osnabrück. But the economic focus remained on the region more immediately surrounding Bursfelde. Management of the farms was in most cases contracted out, but the main estate at Bursfelde was directly managed.

In 1331, under abbot Henry Lasar, monastic discipline began to relax, the school was neglected and the valuable possessions dissipated. From 1331 to 1424 no records of the abbey were kept. When in 1424 the aged Albert of Bodenstein became abbot, both church and school had fallen almost into ruins, and the monastery itself was in a dilapidated condition, housing a single old monk. Albert was too old to undertake the gigantic task of restoring Bursfelde and resigned the abbacy in 1430.

During the 15th century a strong current of monastic and ecclesiastical reform made itself felt throughout the Roman Catholic world. One of the first Benedictine reformers was John Dederoth of Northeim. After carrying out notable reforms at Clus Abbey, where he had been abbot since 1430, Dederoth was persuaded by Duke Otto of Brunswick in 1433 to undertake the reform of Bursfelde. Obtaining four exemplary religious from the monastery of St. Matthias' Abbey, Trier, he assigned two of them to the monastery at Clus, to maintain his reformed discipline there, while the other two accompanied him to Bursfelde. As abbot of Clus, he was able to recruit from that community for Bursfelde. Dederoth succeeded beyond expectations in the restoration of Bursfelde and began the reform of Reinhausen Abbey, near Göttingen, but died on 6 February 1439, before his efforts in that quarter had borne fruit.

== Bursfelde Congregation ==
See main article Bursfelde Congregation

Dederoth's successor, John of Hagen, obtained permission in 1445 from the Council of Basle to restore the Divine Office to the original form of the old Benedictine breviary and to introduce liturgical and disciplinary uniformity in the monasteries that followed the reform of Bursfelde. On 11 March 1446 the Cardinal Legate Louis d'Allemand approved the Bursfelde Union or Congregation, which then consisted of six abbeys: Bursfelde itself, Clus, Reinhausen, Cismar in Schleswig-Holstein, St. Jacob near Mainz, and Huysburg near Magdeburg. On 6 March 1458, Pope Pius II approved the statutes of the congregation.

The Bursfelde Congregation was a highly beneficial reforming influence on the spiritual life of the time in the Benedictine monasteries of Germany during the second half of the fifteenth, and the first half of the sixteenth, century. At the death of Abbot John of Hagen thirty-six monasteries had already joined the Bursfelde Congregation, and just before the Reformation, at least 136 abbeys, scattered through all parts of Germany, belonged to it. The efficacy of the Congregation was severely curtailed by the Reformation, during which many of its member houses were dissolved, but continued in a restricted form until the secularisations of the late 18th and early 19th centuries dissolved the surviving religious houses.

== Reformation and dissolution ==
In 1579, Andrew Lüderitz, the last abbot of Bursfelde, was driven out by the Lutheran Duke Julius of Brunswick, and Bursfelde ceased to be a Catholic monastery. The possessions of the abbey were confiscated, and the abbot was replaced by a Lutheran. A Protestant convent was accommodated here until well into the 17th century, when the estates were leased out to tenants. A few Catholic monks returned for a time during the Thirty Years' War.

The title of (Protestant) abbot has been bestowed since 1828 on the Senior Fellow of the Theological Faculty at the University of Göttingen.

The surviving abbey buildings are still used for theological training and conferences. The legal basis for the meeting house is the Evangelical Lutheran Church of Hanover. The spiritual center is incorporated into the House of Church Offices of the Church of Hanover. It is owned by the Hanover Chamber monaste.
