= Mrakovi =

- Village
- Location within Bosnia and Herzegovina
- Coordinates: 43°58′N 18°01′E
- Country: Bosnia and Herzegovina
- Entity: Federation of Bosnia and Herzegovina
- Canton: Central Bosnia
- Municipality: Kiseljak

Area
  - Total: 0.34 sq mi (0.87 km^{2})

Population (2013)
  - Total: 48
  - Density: 140/sq mi (55/km^{2})
- Time zone: UTC+1 (CET)
  - Summer (DST): UTC+2 (CEST)

Mrakovi is a village in the municipality of Kiseljak, Bosnia and Herzegovina.

== Demographics ==
According to the 2013 census, its population was 48, all Croats.
