= Bukovica, Kiseljak =

Bukovica
- Village
- Location within Bosnia and Herzegovina
- Coordinates: 43°50′53″N 18°07′22″E
- Country: Bosnia and Herzegovina
- Entity: Federation of Bosnia and Herzegovina
- Canton: Central Bosnia
- Municipality: Kiseljak

Area
  - Total: 1.10 sq mi (2.86 km^{2})

Population (2013)
  - Total: 321
  - Density: 291/sq mi (112/km^{2})
- Time zone: UTC+1 (CET)
  - Summer (DST): UTC+2 (CEST)

Bukovica is a village in the municipality of Kiseljak, Bosnia and Herzegovina.

== Demographics ==
According to the 2013 census, its population was 321.

Ethnicity in 2013
Ethnicity	Number	Percentage
Bosniaks	270	84.1%
Croats	50	15.6%
Serbs	1	0.3%
Total	321	100%
