= Kovači, Kiseljak =

Kovači Ковачи
- Village
- Location within Bosnia and Herzegovina
- Coordinates: 43°53′51″N 18°08′17″E
- Country: Bosnia and Herzegovina
- Entity: Federation of Bosnia and Herzegovina
- Canton: Central Bosnia
- Municipality: Kiseljak

Area
  - Total: 0.70 sq mi (1.82 km^{2})

Population (2013)
  - Total: 111
  - Density: 158/sq mi (61.0/km^{2})
- Time zone: UTC+1 (CET)
  - Summer (DST): UTC+2 (CEST)

Kovači is a village in the municipality of Kiseljak, Bosnia and Herzegovina.

== Demographics ==
According to the 2013 census, its population was 111.

Ethnicity in 2013
Ethnicity	Number	Percentage
Croats	78	70.3%
Serbs	17	15.3%
Bosniaks	8	7.2%
other/undeclared	8	7.2%
Total	111	100%
