= Rastovci =

- Village
- Location within Bosnia and Herzegovina
- Coordinates: 44.1632343°N 17.6534068°E
- Country: Bosnia and Herzegovina
- Entity: Federation of Bosnia and Herzegovina
- Canton: Central Bosnia
- Municipality: Novi Travnik

Area
  - Total: 0.88 sq mi (2.27 km^{2})

Population (2013)
  - Total: 760
  - Density: 870/sq mi (330/km^{2})
- Time zone: UTC+1 (CET)
  - Summer (DST): UTC+2 (CEST)

Rastovci is a village in the municipality of Novi Travnik, Bosnia and Herzegovina.

== Demographics ==
According to the 2013 census, its population was 760.

Ethnicity in 2013
Ethnicity	Number	Percentage
Croats	743	97.8%
Serbs	6	0.8%
Bosniaks	5	0.7%
other/undeclared	6	0.8%
Total	760	100%
