= Miroševići =

- Village
- Location within Bosnia and Herzegovina
- Coordinates: 44°03′N 18°00′E
- Country: Bosnia and Herzegovina
- Entity: Federation of Bosnia and Herzegovina
- Canton: Central Bosnia
- Municipality: Kiseljak

Area
  - Total: 0.65 sq mi (1.68 km^{2})

Population (2013)
  - Total: 9
  - Density: 14/sq mi (5.4/km^{2})
- Time zone: UTC+1 (CET)
  - Summer (DST): UTC+2 (CEST)

Miroševići is a village in the municipality of Kiseljak, Bosnia and Herzegovina.

== Demographics ==
According to the 2013 census, its population was 9, all Bosniaks.
