= Žeželovo =

- Village
- Location within Bosnia and Herzegovina
- Coordinates: 43°51′43″N 18°07′57″E
- Country: Bosnia and Herzegovina
- Entity: Federation of Bosnia and Herzegovina
- Canton: Central Bosnia
- Municipality: Kiseljak

Area
  - Total: 1.15 sq mi (2.98 km^{2})

Population (2013)
  - Total: 254
  - Density: 221/sq mi (85.2/km^{2})
- Time zone: UTC+1 (CET)
  - Summer (DST): UTC+2 (CEST)

Žeželovo is a village in the municipality of Kiseljak, Bosnia and Herzegovina.

== Demographics ==
According to the 2013 census, its population was 254.

Ethnicity in 2013
Ethnicity	Number	Percentage
Bosniaks	205	80.7%
Croats	46	18.1%
Serbs	1	0.4%
other/undeclared	2	0.8%
Total	254	100%
