= Pobrđe Orahovo =

- Village
- Location within Bosnia and Herzegovina
- Coordinates: 44°00′N 18°00′E
- Country: Bosnia and Herzegovina
- Entity: Federation of Bosnia and Herzegovina
- Canton: Central Bosnia
- Municipality: Kiseljak

Area
  - Total: 0.073 sq mi (0.19 km^{2})

Population (2013)
  - Total: 12
  - Density: 160/sq mi (63/km^{2})
- Time zone: UTC+1 (CET)
  - Summer (DST): UTC+2 (CEST)

Pobrđe Orahovo is a village in the municipality of Kiseljak, Bosnia and Herzegovina.

== Demographics ==
According to the 2013 census, its population was 12, all Croats.
