= Gaj (Kiseljak) =

- Village
- Location within Bosnia and Herzegovina
- Coordinates: 43°56′45″N 18°01′52″E
- Country: Bosnia and Herzegovina
- Entity: Federation of Bosnia and Herzegovina
- Canton: Central Bosnia
- Municipality: Kiseljak

Area
  - Total: 0.062 sq mi (0.16 km^{2})

Population (2013)
  - Total: 1
  - Density: 16/sq mi (6.2/km^{2})
- Time zone: UTC+1 (CET)
  - Summer (DST): UTC+2 (CEST)

Gaj is a village in the municipality of Kiseljak, Bosnia and Herzegovina.

== Demographics ==
According to the 2013 census, its population was just 1, a Croat.
