= Boljkovići =

- Village
- Location within Bosnia and Herzegovina
- Coordinates: 43°53′N 18°09′E
- Country: Bosnia and Herzegovina
- Entity: Federation of Bosnia and Herzegovina
- Canton: Central Bosnia
- Municipality: Kiseljak

Area
  - Total: 0.50 sq mi (1.30 km^{2})

Population (2013)
  - Total: 59
  - Density: 120/sq mi (45/km^{2})
- Time zone: UTC+1 (CET)
  - Summer (DST): UTC+2 (CEST)

Boljkovići is a village in the municipality of Kiseljak, Bosnia and Herzegovina.

== Demographics ==
According to the 2013 census, its population was 59.

Ethnicity in 2013
Ethnicity	Number	Percentage
Croats	58	98.3%
Bosniaks	1	1.7%
Total	59	100%
