= Brnjaci =

- Village
- Location within Bosnia and Herzegovina
- Coordinates: 43°55′N 18°08′E
- Country: Bosnia and Herzegovina
- Entity: Federation of Bosnia and Herzegovina
- Canton: Central Bosnia
- Municipality: Kiseljak

Area
  - Total: 0.55 sq mi (1.43 km^{2})

Population (2013)
  - Total: 1,065
  - Density: 1,930/sq mi (745/km^{2})
- Time zone: UTC+1 (CET)
  - Summer (DST): UTC+2 (CEST)

Brnjaci is a village in the municipality of Kiseljak, Bosnia and Herzegovina.

== Demographics ==
According to the 2013 census, its population was 1,065.

Ethnicity in 2013
Ethnicity	Number	Percentage
Croats	912	85.6%
Bosniaks	104	9.8%
Serbs	31	2.9%
other/undeclared	18	1.7%
Total	1,065	100%
