= Ljetovik =

- Village
- Location within Bosnia and Herzegovina
- Country: Bosnia and Herzegovina
- Entity: Federation of Bosnia and Herzegovina
- Canton: Central Bosnia
- Municipality: Kiseljak

Area
  - Total: 0.97 sq mi (2.50 km^{2})

Population (2013)
  - Total: 162
  - Density: 168/sq mi (64.8/km^{2})
- Time zone: UTC+1 (CET)
  - Summer (DST): UTC+2 (CEST)

Ljetovik is a village in the municipality of Kiseljak, Bosnia and Herzegovina.

== Demographics ==
According to the 2013 census, its population was 162.

Ethnicity in 2013
Ethnicity	Number	Percentage
Croats	160	98.8%
Bosniaks	1	0.6%
Serbs	1	0.6%
Total	162	100%
