= Ivica (Kiseljak) =

- Village
- Location within Bosnia and Herzegovina
- Coordinates: 43°52′27″N 18°07′22″E
- Country: Bosnia and Herzegovina
- Entity: Federation of Bosnia and Herzegovina
- Canton: Central Bosnia
- Municipality: Kiseljak

Area
  - Total: 0.58 sq mi (1.50 km^{2})

Population (2013)
  - Total: 62
  - Density: 110/sq mi (41/km^{2})
- Time zone: UTC+1 (CET)
  - Summer (DST): UTC+2 (CEST)

Ivica is a village in the municipality of Kiseljak, Bosnia and Herzegovina.

== Demographics ==
According to the 2013 census, its population was 62.

Ethnicity in 2013
Ethnicity	Number	Percentage
Bosniaks	43	69.4%
Croats	19	30.6%
Total	62	100%
