= Datići =

- Village
- Location within Bosnia and Herzegovina
- Coordinates: 44°01′N 17°59′E
- Country: Bosnia and Herzegovina
- Entity: Federation of Bosnia and Herzegovina
- Canton: Central Bosnia
- Municipality: Kiseljak

Area
  - Total: 1.89 sq mi (4.89 km^{2})

Population (2013)
  - Total: 45
  - Density: 24/sq mi (9.2/km^{2})
- Time zone: UTC+1 (CET)
  - Summer (DST): UTC+2 (CEST)

Datići is a village in the municipality of Kiseljak, Bosnia and Herzegovina.

== Demographics ==
According to the 2013 census, its population was 45.

Ethnicity in 2013
Ethnicity	Number	Percentage
Croats	38	84.4%
Bosniaks	7	15.6%
Total	45	100%
