= Jehovac =

- Village
- Location within Bosnia and Herzegovina
- Coordinates: 43°59′14″N 18°02′43″E
- Country: Bosnia and Herzegovina
- Entity: Federation of Bosnia and Herzegovina
- Canton: Central Bosnia
- Municipality: Kiseljak

Area
  - Total: 0.67 sq mi (1.73 km^{2})

Population (2013)
  - Total: 591
  - Density: 885/sq mi (342/km^{2})
- Time zone: UTC+1 (CET)
  - Summer (DST): UTC+2 (CEST)

Jehovac is a village in the municipality of Kiseljak, Bosnia and Herzegovina.

== Demographics ==
According to the 2013 census, its population was 591.

Ethnicity in 2013
Ethnicity	Number	Percentage
Croats	498	84.3%
Bosniaks	85	14.4%
Serbs	6	1.0%
other/undeclared	2	0.3%
Total	591	100%
