= Behrići =

Behrići Бехрићи
- Village
- Location within Bosnia and Herzegovina
- Coordinates: 43°59′N 18°04′E
- Country: Bosnia and Herzegovina
- Entity: Federation of Bosnia and Herzegovina
- Canton: Central Bosnia
- Municipality: Kiseljak

Area
  - Total: 0.32 sq mi (0.83 km^{2})

Population (2013)
  - Total: 190
  - Density: 590/sq mi (230/km^{2})
- Time zone: UTC+1 (CET)
  - Summer (DST): UTC+2 (CEST)

Behrići (Cyrillic: Бехрићи) is a village in the municipality of Kiseljak, Bosnia and Herzegovina.

== Demographics ==
According to the 2013 census, its population was 190.

Ethnicity in 2013
Ethnicity	Number	Percentage
Bosniaks	172	90.5%
Croats	17	8.9%
other/undeclared	1	0.5%
Total	190	100%
