= Podastinje =

- Village
- Location within Bosnia and Herzegovina
- Coordinates: 43°58′N 18°05′E
- Country: Bosnia and Herzegovina
- Entity: Federation of Bosnia and Herzegovina
- Canton: Central Bosnia
- Municipality: Kiseljak

Area
  - Total: 1.54 sq mi (3.98 km^{2})

Population (2013)
  - Total: 327
  - Density: 213/sq mi (82.2/km^{2})
- Time zone: UTC+1 (CET)
  - Summer (DST): UTC+2 (CEST)

Podastinje is a village in the municipality of Kiseljak, Bosnia and Herzegovina.

== Demographics ==
According to the 2013 census, its population was 327.

Ethnicity in 2013
Ethnicity	Number	Percentage
Croats	320	97.9%
Serbs	5	1.5%
other/undeclared	2	0.6%
Total	327	100%
