= Toplica (Kiseljak) =

- Village
- Location within Bosnia and Herzegovina
- Coordinates: 43°50′05″N 18°06′19″E
- Country: Bosnia and Herzegovina
- Entity: Federation of Bosnia and Herzegovina
- Canton: Central Bosnia
- Municipality: Kiseljak

Area
  - Total: 1.47 sq mi (3.82 km^{2})

Population (2013)
  - Total: 54
  - Density: 37/sq mi (14/km^{2})
- Time zone: UTC+1 (CET)
  - Summer (DST): UTC+2 (CEST)

Toplica is a village in the municipality of Kiseljak, Bosnia and Herzegovina.

== Demographics ==
According to the 2013 census, its population was 54.

Ethnicity in 2013
Ethnicity	Number	Percentage
Bosniaks	42	77.8%
Croats	10	18.5%
other/undeclared	2	3.7%
Total	54	100%
