= Zabrđe, Kiseljak =

Zabrđe
- Village
- Location within Bosnia and Herzegovina
- Coordinates: 43°50′21″N 18°06′50″E
- Country: Bosnia and Herzegovina
- Entity: Federation of Bosnia and Herzegovina
- Canton: Central Bosnia
- Municipality: Kiseljak

Area
  - Total: 0.82 sq mi (2.12 km^{2})

Population (2013)
  - Total: 188
  - Density: 230/sq mi (88.7/km^{2})
- Time zone: UTC+1 (CET)
  - Summer (DST): UTC+2 (CEST)

Zabrđe is a village in the municipality of Kiseljak, Bosnia and Herzegovina.

== Demographics ==
According to the 2013 census, its population was 188.

Ethnicity in 2013
Ethnicity	Number	Percentage
Bosniaks	163	86.7%
Croats	25	13.3%
Total	188	100%
