= Čubren =

Ćubren
- Village
- Location within Bosnia and Herzegovina
- Coordinates: 43°52′56″N 18°07′35″E
- Country: Bosnia and Herzegovina
- Entity: Federation of Bosnia and Herzegovina
- Canton: Central Bosnia
- Municipality: Kiseljak

Area
  - Total: 1.73 sq mi (4.47 km^{2})

Population (2013)
  - Total: 111
  - Density: 64.3/sq mi (24.8/km^{2})
- Time zone: UTC+1 (CET)
  - Summer (DST): UTC+2 (CEST)

Čubren is a village in the municipality of Kiseljak, Bosnia and Herzegovina.

== Demographics ==
According to the 2013 census, its population was 111.

Ethnicity in 2013
Ethnicity	Number	Percentage
Croats	63	56.8%
Bosniaks	35	31.5%
Serbs	2	1.8%
other/undeclared	11	9.9%
Total	111	100%
