= Pariževići =

- Village
- Location within Bosnia and Herzegovina
- Coordinates: 43°57′N 18°03′E
- Country: Bosnia and Herzegovina
- Entity: Federation of Bosnia and Herzegovina
- Canton: Central Bosnia
- Municipality: Kiseljak

Area
  - Total: 0.55 sq mi (1.42 km^{2})

Population (2013)
  - Total: 281
  - Density: 513/sq mi (198/km^{2})
- Time zone: UTC+1 (CET)
  - Summer (DST): UTC+2 (CEST)

Pariževići is a village in the municipality of Kiseljak, Bosnia and Herzegovina.

== Demographics ==
According to the 2013 census, its population was 281.

Ethnicity in 2013
Ethnicity	Number	Percentage
Croats	271	96.4%
Serbs	5	1.8%
other/undeclared	5	1.8%
Total	281	100%
