= Završje (Kiseljak) =

- Village
- Location within Bosnia and Herzegovina
- Country: Bosnia and Herzegovina
- Entity: Federation of Bosnia and Herzegovina
- Canton: Central Bosnia
- Municipality: Kiseljak

Area
  - Total: 1.22 sq mi (3.17 km^{2})

Population (2013)
  - Total: 76
  - Density: 62/sq mi (24/km^{2})
- Time zone: UTC+1 (CET)
  - Summer (DST): UTC+2 (CEST)

Završje is a village in the municipality of Kiseljak, Bosnia and Herzegovina.

== Demographics ==
According to the 2013 census, its population was 76.

Ethnicity in 2013
Ethnicity	Number	Percentage
Croats	73	96.1%
Serbs	3	3.9%
Total	76	100%
