= Radanovići, Kiseljak =

Radanovići
- Village
- Location within Bosnia and Herzegovina
- Country: Bosnia and Herzegovina
- Entity: Federation of Bosnia and Herzegovina
- Canton: Central Bosnia
- Municipality: Kiseljak

Area
  - Total: 0.37 sq mi (0.95 km^{2})

Population (2013)
  - Total: 253
  - Density: 690/sq mi (270/km^{2})
- Time zone: UTC+1 (CET)
  - Summer (DST): UTC+2 (CEST)

Radanovići is a village in the municipality of Kiseljak, Bosnia and Herzegovina.

== Demographics ==
According to the 2013 census, its population was 253.

Ethnicity in 2013
Ethnicity	Number	Percentage
Bosniaks	181	71.5%
Croats	49	19.4%
Serbs	1	0.4%
other/undeclared	22	8.7%
Total	253	100%
