= Duke (Kiseljak) =

- Village
- Location within Bosnia and Herzegovina
- Coordinates: 43.9951613°N 17.9870955°E
- Country: Bosnia and Herzegovina
- Entity: Federation of Bosnia and Herzegovina
- Canton: Central Bosnia
- Municipality: Kiseljak

Area
  - Total: 1.04 sq mi (2.70 km^{2})

Population (2013)
  - Total: 27
  - Density: 26/sq mi (10/km^{2})
- Time zone: UTC+1 (CET)
  - Summer (DST): UTC+2 (CEST)

Duke is a village in the municipality of Kiseljak, Bosnia and Herzegovina.

== Demographics ==
According to the 2013 census, its population was 27.

Ethnicity in 2013
Ethnicity	Number	Percentage
Croats	26	96.3%
Serbs	1	3.7%
Total	27	100%
