= Dubrave, Kiseljak =

Dubrave
- Village
- Location within Bosnia and Herzegovina
- Coordinates: 43°58′37″N 18°00′54″E
- Country: Bosnia and Herzegovina
- Entity: Federation of Bosnia and Herzegovina
- Canton: Central Bosnia
- Municipality: Kiseljak

Area
  - Total: 0.61 sq mi (1.57 km^{2})

Population (2013)
  - Total: 185
  - Density: 305/sq mi (118/km^{2})
- Time zone: UTC+1 (CET)
  - Summer (DST): UTC+2 (CEST)

Dubrave is a village in the municipality of Kiseljak, Bosnia and Herzegovina.

== Demographics ==
According to the 2013 census, its population was 185.

Ethnicity in 2013
Ethnicity	Number	Percentage
Croats	184	99.5%
other/undeclared	1	0.5%
Total	185	100%
