= Mahala Gomionica =

- Village
- Location within Bosnia and Herzegovina
- Country: Bosnia and Herzegovina
- Entity: Federation of Bosnia and Herzegovina
- Canton: Central Bosnia
- Municipality: Kiseljak

Area
  - Total: 0.17 sq mi (0.45 km^{2})

Population (2013)
  - Total: 68
  - Density: 390/sq mi (150/km^{2})
- Time zone: UTC+1 (CET)
  - Summer (DST): UTC+2 (CEST)

Mahala Gomionica is a village in the municipality of Kiseljak, Bosnia and Herzegovina.

== Demographics ==
According to the 2013 census, its population was 68.

Ethnicity in 2013
Ethnicity	Number	Percentage
Bosniaks	67	98.5%
other/undeclared	1	1.5%
Total	68	100%
