= Johannes de Indagine (Benedictine) =

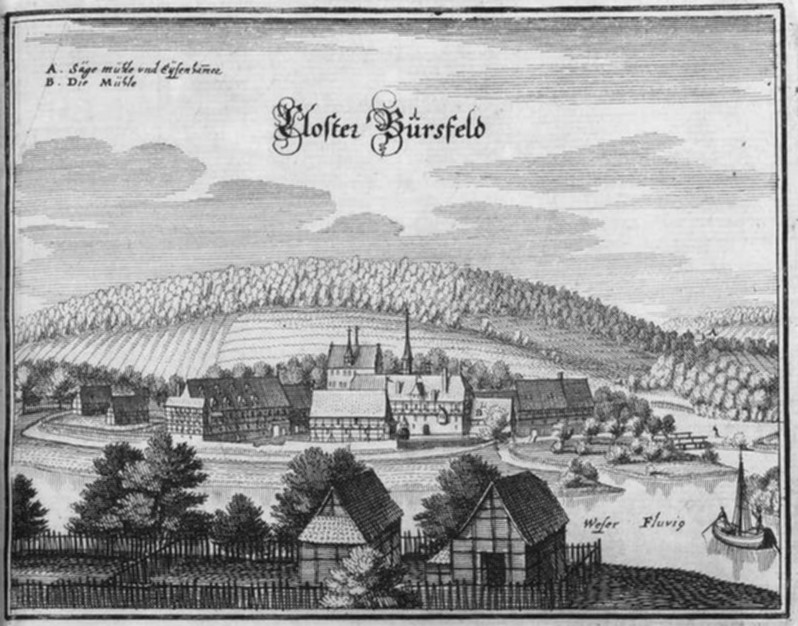
Bursfelde Abbey after Matthäus Merian, c. 1654−1658

Johannes de Indagine, born Johannes von Hagen (died 11 August 1469) was a Benedictine monk and a notable abbot of Bursfelde Abbey. He was the originator of the Bursfelde Congregation.

== Life ==
Johannes de Indagine, born Johannes von Hagen, was at first a canon of the Magdalenenstift in Hildesheim. In 1439, after the death of Johannes Dederoth, who reformed Bursfelde Abbey after a period of decline, he was elected his successor as abbot.

During Indagine's period of office, several other monasteries adopted the mode of life of Bursfelde and formed an association, the Bursfelde Congregation, which continued to grow after Indagine's death. In May 1446 under his direction the first general meeting of the chapter general of the new congregation took place, attended by all the abbots of the participating monasteries. This continued as an annual meeting. This chapter general was the highest authority in the congregation and was empowered to make very wide-reaching decisions.

== Literature ==
- Falk Eisermann (1992). "Johannes von Hagen". In Bautz, Friedrich Wilhelm (ed.). Biographisch-Bibliographisches Kirchenlexikon (BBKL) (in German). Vol. 3. Herzberg: Bautz. cols. 387–388. ISBN 3-88309-035-2.
- Jakob Franck (1881). "Indagine, Johannes de (Benediktiner)". Allgemeine Deutsche Biographie (in German). Vol. 14. Leipzig: Duncker & Humblot. pp. 65–67.
- Klemens Honselmann (1974). "Indagine, Johannes de". Neue Deutsche Biographie (in German). Vol. 10. Berlin: Duncker & Humblot. pp. 168–168. (full text online).
