= Kuliješ =

- Village
- Location within Bosnia and Herzegovina
- Coordinates: 43°52′N 18°09′E
- Country: Bosnia and Herzegovina
- Entity: Federation of Bosnia and Herzegovina
- Canton: Central Bosnia
- Municipality: Kiseljak

Area
  - Total: 0.89 sq mi (2.30 km^{2})

Population (2013)
  - Total: 347
  - Density: 391/sq mi (151/km^{2})
- Time zone: UTC+1 (CET)
  - Summer (DST): UTC+2 (CEST)

Kuliješ is a village in the municipality of Kiseljak, Bosnia and Herzegovina.

== Demographics ==
According to the 2013 census, its population was 347.

Ethnicity in 2013
Ethnicity	Number	Percentage
Croats	334	96.3%
Serbs	9	2.6%
Bosniaks	2	0.6%
other/undeclared	2	0.6%
Total	347	100%
