= Gojakovac =

- Village
- Location within Bosnia and Herzegovina
- Coordinates: 43.9742435°N 18.0367271°E
- Country: Bosnia and Herzegovina
- Entity: Federation of Bosnia and Herzegovina
- Canton: Central Bosnia
- Municipality: Kiseljak

Area
  - Total: 0.71 sq mi (1.84 km^{2})

Population (2013)
  - Total: 93
  - Density: 130/sq mi (51/km^{2})
- Time zone: UTC+1 (CET)
  - Summer (DST): UTC+2 (CEST)

Gojakovac is a village in the municipality of Kiseljak, Bosnia and Herzegovina.

== Demographics ==
According to the 2013 census, its population was 93.

Ethnicity in 2013
Ethnicity	Number	Percentage
Croats	81	87.1%
Bosniaks	3	3.2%
Serbs	7	7.5%
other/undeclared	2	2.2%
Total	93	100%
