= Hadrovci (Kiseljak) =

- Village
- Location within Bosnia and Herzegovina
- Coordinates: 44°00′N 18°03′E
- Country: Bosnia and Herzegovina
- Entity: Federation of Bosnia and Herzegovina
- Canton: Central Bosnia
- Municipality: Kiseljak

Area
  - Total: 0.085 sq mi (0.22 km^{2})

Population (2013)
  - Total: 12
  - Density: 140/sq mi (55/km^{2})
- Time zone: UTC+1 (CET)
  - Summer (DST): UTC+2 (CEST)

Hadrovci is a village in the municipality of Kiseljak, Bosnia and Herzegovina.

== Demographics ==
According to the 2013 census, its population was 12.

Ethnicity in 2013
Ethnicity	Number	Percentage
Croats	11	91.7%
Bosniaks	1	8.3%
Total	12	100%
