= Markovići (Kiseljak) =

- Village
- Location within Bosnia and Herzegovina
- Coordinates: 44°01′54″N 17°58′04″E
- Country: Bosnia and Herzegovina
- Entity: Federation of Bosnia and Herzegovina
- Canton: Central Bosnia
- Municipality: Kiseljak

Area
  - Total: 0.53 sq mi (1.38 km^{2})

Population (2013)
  - Total: 47
  - Density: 88/sq mi (34/km^{2})
- Time zone: UTC+1 (CET)
  - Summer (DST): UTC+2 (CEST)

Markovići is a village in the municipality of Kiseljak, Bosnia and Herzegovina.

== Demographics ==
According to the 2013 census, its population was 47, all Bosniaks.
