= Rankovići =

Municipality of Novi Travnik, Bosnia and Herzegovina

- Village
- Location within Bosnia and Herzegovina
- Coordinates: 44.1795871°N 17.6685843°E
- Country: Bosnia and Herzegovina
- Entity: Federation of Bosnia and Herzegovina
- Canton: Central Bosnia
- Municipality: Novi Travnik

Area
  - Total: 1.36 sq mi (3.52 km^{2})

Population (2013)
  - Total: 902
  - Density: 664/sq mi (256/km^{2})
- Time zone: UTC+1 (CET)
  - Summer (DST): UTC+2 (CEST)

Rankovići is a village in the municipality of Novi Travnik, Bosnia and Herzegovina.

== Demographics ==
According to the 2013 census, its population was 902.

Ethnicity in 2013
Ethnicity	Number	Percentage
Croats	673	74.6%
Bosniaks	206	22.8%
Serbs	2	0.2%
other/undeclared	21	2.3%
Total	902	100%
