= Solakovići (Kiseljak) =

- Village
- Location within Bosnia and Herzegovina
- Coordinates: 43°51′00″N 18°07′44″E
- Country: Bosnia and Herzegovina
- Entity: Federation of Bosnia and Herzegovina
- Canton: Central Bosnia
- Municipality: Kiseljak

Area
  - Total: 0.34 sq mi (0.89 km^{2})

Population (2013)
  - Total: 220
  - Density: 640/sq mi (250/km^{2})
- Time zone: UTC+1 (CET)
  - Summer (DST): UTC+2 (CEST)

Solakovići is a village in the municipality of Kiseljak, Bosnia and Herzegovina.

== Demographics ==
According to the 2013 census, its population was 220.

Ethnicity in 2013
Ethnicity	Number	Percentage
Bosniaks	219	99.5%
other/undeclared	1	0.5%
Total	220	100%
