= Kotačala =

- Village
- Location within Bosnia and Herzegovina
- Coordinates: 43°58′56″N 18°04′02″E
- Country: Bosnia and Herzegovina
- Entity: Federation of Bosnia and Herzegovina
- Canton: Central Bosnia
- Municipality: Kiseljak

Area
  - Total: 0.089 sq mi (0.23 km^{2})

Population (2013)
  - Total: 3
  - Density: 34/sq mi (13/km^{2})
- Time zone: UTC+1 (CET)
  - Summer (DST): UTC+2 (CEST)

Kotačala is a village in the municipality of Kiseljak, Bosnia and Herzegovina.

== Demographics ==
According to the 2013 census, its population was 3, all from undisclosed ethnicity.
