= Čalikovac =

- Village
- Location within Bosnia and Herzegovina
- Coordinates: 43°55′38″N 18°07′55″E
- Country: Bosnia and Herzegovina
- Entity: Federation of Bosnia and Herzegovina
- Canton: Central Bosnia
- Municipality: Kiseljak

Area
  - Total: 0.37 sq mi (0.95 km^{2})

Population (2013)
  - Total: 23
  - Density: 63/sq mi (24/km^{2})
- Time zone: UTC+1 (CET)
  - Summer (DST): UTC+2 (CEST)

Čalikovac is a village in the municipality of Kiseljak, Bosnia and Herzegovina.

== Demographics ==
According to the 2013 census, its population was 23, all Croats.
