= Paretak =

- Village
- Location within Bosnia and Herzegovina
- Coordinates: 43°55′14″N 18°08′16″E
- Country: Bosnia and Herzegovina
- Entity: Federation of Bosnia and Herzegovina
- Canton: Central Bosnia
- Municipality: Kiseljak

Area
  - Total: 0.81 sq mi (2.10 km^{2})

Population (2013)
  - Total: 152
  - Density: 187/sq mi (72.4/km^{2})
- Time zone: UTC+1 (CET)
  - Summer (DST): UTC+2 (CEST)

Paretak is a village in the municipality of Kiseljak, Bosnia and Herzegovina. It was the site of several skirmishes during the Bosnian War.

== Demographics ==
According to the 2013 census, its population was 152.

Ethnicity in 2013
Ethnicity	Number	Percentage
Croats	86	56.6%
Bosniaks	44	28.9%
Serbs	3	2.0%
other/undeclared	19	12.5%
Total	152	100%
