= Lug (Kiseljak) =

- Village
- Location within Bosnia and Herzegovina
- Country: Bosnia and Herzegovina
- Entity: Federation of Bosnia and Herzegovina
- Canton: Central Bosnia
- Municipality: Kiseljak

Area
  - Total: 0.46 sq mi (1.19 km^{2})

Population (2013)
  - Total: 225
  - Density: 490/sq mi (189/km^{2})
- Time zone: UTC+1 (CET)
  - Summer (DST): UTC+2 (CEST)

Lug is a village in the municipality of Kiseljak, Bosnia and Herzegovina.

== Demographics ==
According to the 2013 census, its population was 225.

Ethnicity in 2013
Ethnicity	Number	Percentage
Croats	186	82.7%
Bosniaks	36	16.0%
Serbs	1	0.4%
other/undeclared	2	0.9%
Total	225	100%
