= Borina =

- Village
- Location within Bosnia and Herzegovina
- Coordinates: 43°55′59″N 18°04′07″E
- Country: Bosnia and Herzegovina
- Entity: Federation of Bosnia and Herzegovina
- Canton: Central Bosnia
- Municipality: Kiseljak

Area
  - Total: 1.96 sq mi (5.08 km^{2})

Population (2013)
  - Total: 520
  - Density: 270/sq mi (100/km^{2})
- Time zone: UTC+1 (CET)
  - Summer (DST): UTC+2 (CEST)

Borina is a village in the municipality of Kiseljak, Bosnia and Herzegovina.

== Demographics ==
According to the 2013 census, its population was 520.

Ethnicity in 2013
Ethnicity	Number	Percentage
Croats	382	73.5%
Bosniaks	130	25.0%
Serbs	4	0.8%
other/undeclared	4	0.8%
Total	520	100%
