= Draževići (Kiseljak) =

- Village
- Location within Bosnia and Herzegovina
- Coordinates: 43°54′42″N 18°08′52″E
- Country: Bosnia and Herzegovina
- Entity: Federation of Bosnia and Herzegovina
- Canton: Central Bosnia
- Municipality: Kiseljak

Area
  - Total: 0.98 sq mi (2.53 km^{2})

Population (2013)
  - Total: 315
  - Density: 322/sq mi (125/km^{2})
- Time zone: UTC+1 (CET)
  - Summer (DST): UTC+2 (CEST)

Draževići is a village in the municipality of Kiseljak, Bosnia and Herzegovina.

== Demographics ==
According to the 2013 census, its population was 315.

Ethnicity in 2013
| Ethnicity | Number | Percentage |
|---|---|---|
| Croats | 183 | 58.1% |
| Serbs | 66 | 21.0% |
| Bosniaks | 59 | 18.7% |
| other/undeclared | 7 | 2.2% |
| Total | 315 | 100% |
