= Azapovići =

- Village
- Location within Bosnia and Herzegovina
- Coordinates: 43°53′N 18°10′E
- Country: Bosnia and Herzegovina
- Entity: Federation of Bosnia and Herzegovina
- Canton: Central Bosnia
- Municipality: Kiseljak

Area
  - Total: 1.74 sq mi (4.51 km^{2})

Population (2013)
  - Total: 802
  - Density: 461/sq mi (178/km^{2})
- Time zone: UTC+1 (CET)
  - Summer (DST): UTC+2 (CEST)

Azapovići is a village in the municipality of Kiseljak, Bosnia and Herzegovina.

== Demographics ==
According to the 2013 census, its population was 802.

Ethnicity in 2013
Ethnicity	Number	Percentage
Croats	612	76.3%
Bosniaks	85	10.6%
Serbs	23	2.9%
other/undeclared	82	10.2%
Total	802	100%
