= Male Sotnice =

- Village
- Location within Bosnia and Herzegovina
- Coordinates: 44°02′N 18°01′E
- Country: Bosnia and Herzegovina
- Entity: Federation of Bosnia and Herzegovina
- Canton: Central Bosnia
- Municipality: Kiseljak

Area
  - Total: 0.56 sq mi (1.45 km^{2})

Population (2013)
  - Total: 386
  - Density: 689/sq mi (266/km^{2})
- Time zone: UTC+1 (CET)
  - Summer (DST): UTC+2 (CEST)

Male Sotnice is a village in the municipality of Kiseljak, Bosnia and Herzegovina.

== Demographics ==
According to the 2013 census, its population was 386.

Ethnicity in 2013
Ethnicity	Number	Percentage
Bosniaks	305	79.0%
Croats	76	19.7%
Serbs	1	0.3%
other/undeclared	4	1.0%
Total	386	100%
