= Svinjarevo (Kiseljak) =

- Village
- Location within Bosnia and Herzegovina
- Coordinates: 43°59′N 18°03′E
- Country: Bosnia and Herzegovina
- Entity: Federation of Bosnia and Herzegovina
- Canton: Central Bosnia
- Municipality: Kiseljak

Area
  - Total: 0.44 sq mi (1.15 km^{2})

Population (2013)
  - Total: 242
  - Density: 545/sq mi (210/km^{2})
- Time zone: UTC+1 (CET)
  - Summer (DST): UTC+2 (CEST)

Svinjarevo is a village in the municipality of Kiseljak, Bosnia and Herzegovina.

== Demographics ==
According to the 2013 census, its population was 242, all Bosniaks.
