= Radeljevići =

- Village
- Location within Bosnia and Herzegovina
- Coordinates: 44°01′56″N 17°58′23″E
- Country: Bosnia and Herzegovina
- Entity: Federation of Bosnia and Herzegovina
- Canton: Central Bosnia
- Municipality: Kiseljak

Area
  - Total: 0.28 sq mi (0.73 km^{2})

Population (2013)
  - Total: 137
  - Density: 490/sq mi (190/km^{2})
- Time zone: UTC+1 (CET)
  - Summer (DST): UTC+2 (CEST)

Radeljevići is a village in the municipality of Kiseljak, Bosnia and Herzegovina.

== Demographics ==
According to the 2013 census, its population was 137.

Ethnicity in 2013
Ethnicity	Number	Percentage
Bosniaks	135	98.5%
Croats	2	1.5%
Total	137	100%
