= Dugo Polje (Kiseljak) =

- Village
- Location within Bosnia and Herzegovina
- Coordinates: 44°03′40″N 18°01′41″E
- Country: Bosnia and Herzegovina
- Entity: Federation of Bosnia and Herzegovina
- Canton: Central Bosnia
- Municipality: Kiseljak

Area
  - Total: 0.35 sq mi (0.90 km^{2})

Population (2013)
  - Total: 290
  - Density: 830/sq mi (320/km^{2})
- Time zone: UTC+1 (CET)
  - Summer (DST): UTC+2 (CEST)

Dugo Polje is a village in the municipality of Kiseljak, Bosnia and Herzegovina.

== Demographics ==
According to the 2013 census, its population was 290.

Ethnicity in 2013
Ethnicity	Number	Percentage
Croats	238	82.1%
Bosniaks	43	14.8%
Serbs	2	0.7%
other/undeclared	7	2.4%
Total	290	100%
