= Reput =

- Village
- Location within Bosnia and Herzegovina
- Coordinates: 44.1015045°N 17.6371339°E
- Country: Bosnia and Herzegovina
- Entity: Federation of Bosnia and Herzegovina
- Canton: Central Bosnia
- Municipality: Novi Travnik

Area
  - Total: 0.30 sq mi (0.77 km^{2})

Population (2013)
  - Total: 190
  - Density: 640/sq mi (250/km^{2})
- Time zone: UTC+1 (CET)
  - Summer (DST): UTC+2 (CEST)

Reput is a village in the municipality of Novi Travnik, Bosnia and Herzegovina.

== Demographics ==
According to the 2013 census, its population was 190, all Bosniaks.
