= Potkraj, Kiseljak =

Potkraj
- Village
- Location within Bosnia and Herzegovina
- Coordinates: 43°55′22″N 18°06′18″E
- Country: Bosnia and Herzegovina
- Entity: Federation of Bosnia and Herzegovina
- Canton: Central Bosnia
- Municipality: Kiseljak

Area
  - Total: 1.39 sq mi (3.60 km^{2})

Population (2013)
  - Total: 415
  - Density: 299/sq mi (115/km^{2})
- Time zone: UTC+1 (CET)
  - Summer (DST): UTC+2 (CEST)

Potkraj is a village in the municipality of Kiseljak, in the Central Bosnian Canton of Bosnia and Herzegovina.

== Demographics ==
According to the 2013 census, its population was 415.

Ethnicity in 2013
Ethnicity	Number	Percentage
Croats	228	54.9%
Bosniaks	176	42.4%
Serbs	3	0.7%
Other/Undeclared	8	1.9%
Total	415	100%
