= Križići =

- Village
- Location within Bosnia and Herzegovina
- Coordinates: 43°57′55″N 18°04′32″E
- Country: Bosnia and Herzegovina
- Entity: Federation of Bosnia and Herzegovina
- Canton: Central Bosnia
- Municipality: Kiseljak

Area
  - Total: 0.26 sq mi (0.67 km^{2})

Population (2013)
  - Total: 5
  - Density: 19/sq mi (7.5/km^{2})
- Time zone: UTC+1 (CET)
  - Summer (DST): UTC+2 (CEST)

Križići is a village in the municipality of Kiseljak, Bosnia and Herzegovina.

== Demographics ==
According to the 2013 census, its population was 5.

Ethnicity in 2013
Ethnicity	Number	Percentage
Croats	4	80.0%
other/undeclared	1	20.0%
Total	5	100%
