= Donji Palež =

- Village
- Location within Bosnia and Herzegovina
- Coordinates: 43°56′N 18°06′E
- Country: Bosnia and Herzegovina
- Entity: Federation of Bosnia and Herzegovina
- Canton: Central Bosnia
- Municipality: Kiseljak

Area
  - Total: 0.95 sq mi (2.46 km^{2})

Population (2013)
  - Total: 583
  - Density: 614/sq mi (237/km^{2})
- Time zone: UTC+1 (CET)
  - Summer (DST): UTC+2 (CEST)

Donji Palež is a village in the municipality of Kiseljak, Bosnia and Herzegovina.

== Demographics ==
According to the 2013 census, its population was 583.

Ethnicity in 2013
Ethnicity	Number	Percentage
Bosniaks	330	56.6%
Croats	251	43.1%
Serbs	1	0.2%
other/undeclared	1	0.2%
Total	583	100%
