= Hercezi =

- Village
- Location within Bosnia and Herzegovina
- Coordinates: 43°57′58″N 18°01′39″E
- Country: Bosnia and Herzegovina
- Entity: Federation of Bosnia and Herzegovina
- Canton: Central Bosnia
- Municipality: Kiseljak

Area
  - Total: 1.36 sq mi (3.53 km^{2})

Population (2013)
  - Total: 109
  - Density: 80.0/sq mi (30.9/km^{2})
- Time zone: UTC+1 (CET)
  - Summer (DST): UTC+2 (CEST)

Hercezi is a village in the municipality of Kiseljak, Bosnia and Herzegovina.

== Demographics ==
According to the 2013 census, its population was 109.

Ethnicity in 2013
Ethnicity	Number	Percentage
Bosniaks	89	81.7%
Croats	20	18.3%
other/undeclared	0	0%
Total	109	100%
