= Bilalovac =

- Village
- Location within Bosnia and Herzegovina
- Coordinates: 44°01′25″N 18°02′10″E
- Country: Bosnia and Herzegovina
- Entity: Federation of Bosnia and Herzegovina
- Canton: Central Bosnia
- Municipality: Kiseljak

Area
  - Total: 2.58 sq mi (6.68 km^{2})

Population (2013)
  - Total: 1,048
  - Density: 406/sq mi (157/km^{2})
- Time zone: UTC+1 (CET)
  - Summer (DST): UTC+2 (CEST)

Bilalovac is a village in the municipality of Kiseljak, Bosnia and Herzegovina.

== Demographics ==
According to the 2013 census, its population was 1,048.

Ethnicity in 2013
Ethnicity	Number	Percentage
Bosniaks	744	71.0%
Croats	289	27.6%
Serbs	3	0.3%
other/undeclared	12	1.1%
Total	1,048	100%
