= Krčevine (Kiseljak) =

- Village
- Location within Bosnia and Herzegovina
- Coordinates: 44°00′54″N 18°03′20″E
- Country: Bosnia and Herzegovina
- Entity: Federation of Bosnia and Herzegovina
- Canton: Central Bosnia
- Municipality: Kiseljak

Area
  - Total: 1.84 sq mi (4.76 km^{2})

Population (2013)
  - Total: 660
  - Density: 360/sq mi (140/km^{2})
- Time zone: UTC+1 (CET)
  - Summer (DST): UTC+2 (CEST)

Krčevine is a village in the municipality of Kiseljak, Bosnia and Herzegovina.

== Demographics ==
According to the 2013 census, its population was 660.

Ethnicity in 2013
Ethnicity	Number	Percentage
Croats	650	98.5%
Serbs	4	0.6%
other/undeclared	6	0.9%
Total	660	100%
