= Buzuci =

- Village
- Location in Bosnia and Herzegovina
- Coordinates: 43°53′52″N 18°07′33″E
- Country: Bosnia and Herzegovina
- Entity: Federation of Bosnia and Herzegovina
- Canton: Central Bosnia
- Municipality: Kiseljak

Area
  - Total: 0.90 sq mi (2.33 km^{2})

Population (2013)
  - Total: 37
  - Density: 41/sq mi (16/km^{2})
- Time zone: UTC+1 (CET)
  - Summer (DST): UTC+2 (CEST)

Buzuci is a village in the municipality of Kiseljak, Bosnia and Herzegovina.

== Demographics ==
According to the 2013 census, its population was 37.

Ethnicity in 2013
Ethnicity	Number	Percentage
Croats	35	94.6%
Serbs	1	2.7%
other/undeclared	1	2.7%
Total	37	100%
