= Medovići =

- Village
- Location within Bosnia and Herzegovina
- Country: Bosnia and Herzegovina
- Entity: Federation of Bosnia and Herzegovina
- Canton: Central Bosnia
- Municipality: Kiseljak

Area
  - Total: 0.43 sq mi (1.11 km^{2})

Population (2013)
  - Total: 57
  - Density: 130/sq mi (51/km^{2})
- Time zone: UTC+1 (CET)
  - Summer (DST): UTC+2 (CEST)

Medovići is a village in the municipality of Kiseljak, Bosnia and Herzegovina.

== Demographics ==
According to the 2013 census, its population was 57.

Ethnicity in 2013
Ethnicity	Number	Percentage
Croats	55	96.5%
Serbs	1	1.8%
other/undeclared	1	1.8%
Total	57	100%
