= Doci (Kiseljak) =

- Village
- Location within Bosnia and Herzegovina
- Coordinates: 43°57′29″N 18°01′44″E
- Country: Bosnia and Herzegovina
- Entity: Federation of Bosnia and Herzegovina
- Canton: Central Bosnia
- Municipality: Kiseljak

Area
  - Total: 0.63 sq mi (1.62 km^{2})

Population (2013)
  - Total: 208
  - Density: 333/sq mi (128/km^{2})
- Time zone: UTC+1 (CET)
  - Summer (DST): UTC+2 (CEST)

Doci is a village in the municipality of Kiseljak, Bosnia and Herzegovina.

== Demographics ==
According to the 2013 census, its population was 208.

Ethnicity in 2013
Ethnicity	Number	Percentage
Bosniaks	153	73.6%
Croats	50	24.0%
Serbs	1	0.5%
other/undeclared	4	1.9%
Total	208	100%
