= Gomionica =

- Village
- Location within Bosnia and Herzegovina
- Coordinates: 43°58′N 18°04′E
- Country: Bosnia and Herzegovina
- Entity: Federation of Bosnia and Herzegovina
- Canton: Central Bosnia
- Municipality: Kiseljak

Area
  - Total: 0.58 sq mi (1.51 km^{2})

Population (2013)
  - Total: 444
  - Density: 762/sq mi (294/km^{2})
- Time zone: UTC+1 (CET)
  - Summer (DST): UTC+2 (CEST)

Gomionica is a village in the municipality of Kiseljak, Bosnia and Herzegovina.

== Demographics ==
According to the 2013 census, its population was 444.

Ethnicity in 2013
| Ethnicity | Number | Percentage |
|---|---|---|
| Bosniaks | 428 | 96.4% |
| Croats | 7 | 1.6% |
| other/undeclared | 9 | 2.0% |
| Total | 444 | 100% |
