= Homolj =

- Village
- Location within Bosnia and Herzegovina
- Coordinates: 43°52′N 18°09′E
- Country: Bosnia and Herzegovina
- Entity: Federation of Bosnia and Herzegovina
- Canton: Central Bosnia
- Municipality: Kiseljak

Area
  - Total: 0.14 sq mi (0.36 km^{2})

Population (2013)
  - Total: 140
  - Density: 1,000/sq mi (390/km^{2})
- Time zone: UTC+1 (CET)
  - Summer (DST): UTC+2 (CEST)

Homolj is a village in the municipality of Kiseljak, Bosnia and Herzegovina.

== Demographics ==
According to the 2013 census, its population was 140.

Ethnicity in 2013
| Ethnicity | Number | Percentage |
|---|---|---|
| Croats | 139 | 99.3% |
| other/undeclared | 1 | 0.7% |
| Total | 140 | 100% |
