= Hrastovi =

- Village
- Location within Bosnia and Herzegovina
- Coordinates: 44°01′N 18°00′E
- Country: Bosnia and Herzegovina
- Entity: Federation of Bosnia and Herzegovina
- Canton: Central Bosnia
- Municipality: Kiseljak

Area
  - Total: 1.08 sq mi (2.80 km^{2})

Population (2013)
  - Total: 758
  - Density: 701/sq mi (271/km^{2})
- Time zone: UTC+1 (CET)
  - Summer (DST): UTC+2 (CEST)

Hrastovi is a village in the municipality of Kiseljak, Bosnia and Herzegovina.

== Demographics ==
According to the 2013 census, its population was 758.

Ethnicity in 2013
Ethnicity	Number	Percentage
Bosniaks	394	52.0%
Croats	102	13.5%
Serbs	4	0.5%
other/undeclared	258	34.0%
Total	758	100%
