= Maslinovići =

Village in Bosnia and Herzegovina

- Village
- Location within Bosnia and Herzegovina
- Coordinates: 44°01′N 17°58′E
- Country: Bosnia and Herzegovina
- Entity: Federation of Bosnia and Herzegovina
- Canton: Central Bosnia
- Municipality: Kiseljak

Area
  - Total: 1.14 sq mi (2.96 km^{2})

Population (2013)
  - Total: 8
  - Density: 7.0/sq mi (2.7/km^{2})
- Time zone: UTC+1 (CET)
  - Summer (DST): UTC+2 (CEST)

Maslinovići is a village in the municipality of Kiseljak, Bosnia and Herzegovina.

== Demographics ==
According to the 2013 census, its population was 8.

Ethnicity in 2013
Ethnicity	Number	Percentage
Bosniaks	6	75.0%
Croats	2	25.0%
Total	8	100%
