= Johannes Busch =

Johannes (or Jan) Busch (1399 – c. 1480) was a major reformer and provost of a community of Canons Regular. He was associated with the Brethren of the Common Life.

He was born in Zwolle. He spent most of the last 40 years of his life visiting and inspecting monasteries and convents, including Escherde (1441), Brunswick, and Wienhausen Abbey, then a Cistercian nunnery, where he removed the abbess in 1469. He also wrote some substantial surviving works, including a chronicle of Windesheim. He died at Hildesheim.
