= Joseph von Zhishman =

- Born: February 18, 1820; Ljubljana, Habsburg monarchy (now Slovenia)
- Died: September 4, 1894 (aged 74); Vienna, Habsburg monarchy (now Austria)
- Other names: Jožef Čižman
- Occupation: Lawyer

Joseph von Zhishman (Slovenized: Josip or Jožef Čižman, February 18, 1820 – September 4, 1894) was an Austrian lawyer and specialist in canon law.

Zhishman was born in Ljubljana and baptized Josephus Zhishman. He attended high school (1832–1837) and the Lyceum in Ljubljana. In 1839 he went to Vienna to study law and graduated in 1843. He continued his studies in oriental languages, obtained his doctorate, and worked in the philology and history department at the University of Vienna until 1851. After he passed the state examination in history, geography, Latin, and Greek for all high school classes in 1851, he taught at the Trieste State High School. In 1853 he was transferred to the Theresianum in Vienna. In 1864 he proposed the establishment of the chair for Eastern Church law at the University of Vienna and offered himself as a lecturer; the department was established in 1867, and Zhishman became an associate professor and a full professor in 1871. He died in Vienna.

== Works ==
- 1858: Die Unionsverhandlungen zwischen der orientalischen und römischen Kirche seit dem Anfange des XV. Jahrhunderts bis zum Concil von Ferrara. Vienna.
- 1864: Das Eherecht der orientalischen Kirche. Vienna.
- 1867: Die Synoden und die Episkopal-Ämter in der morgenländischen Kirche. Vienna.
- 1888: Das Stifterrecht in der morgenländischen Kirche. Vienna.
