= Han Ploča =

- Village
- Location within Bosnia and Herzegovina
- Coordinates: 43°54′N 18°09′E
- Country: Bosnia and Herzegovina
- Entity: Federation of Bosnia and Herzegovina
- Canton: Central Bosnia
- Municipality: Kiseljak

Area
  - Total: 0.58 sq mi (1.50 km^{2})

Population (2013)
  - Total: 371
  - Density: 641/sq mi (247/km^{2})
- Time zone: UTC+1 (CET)
  - Summer (DST): UTC+2 (CEST)

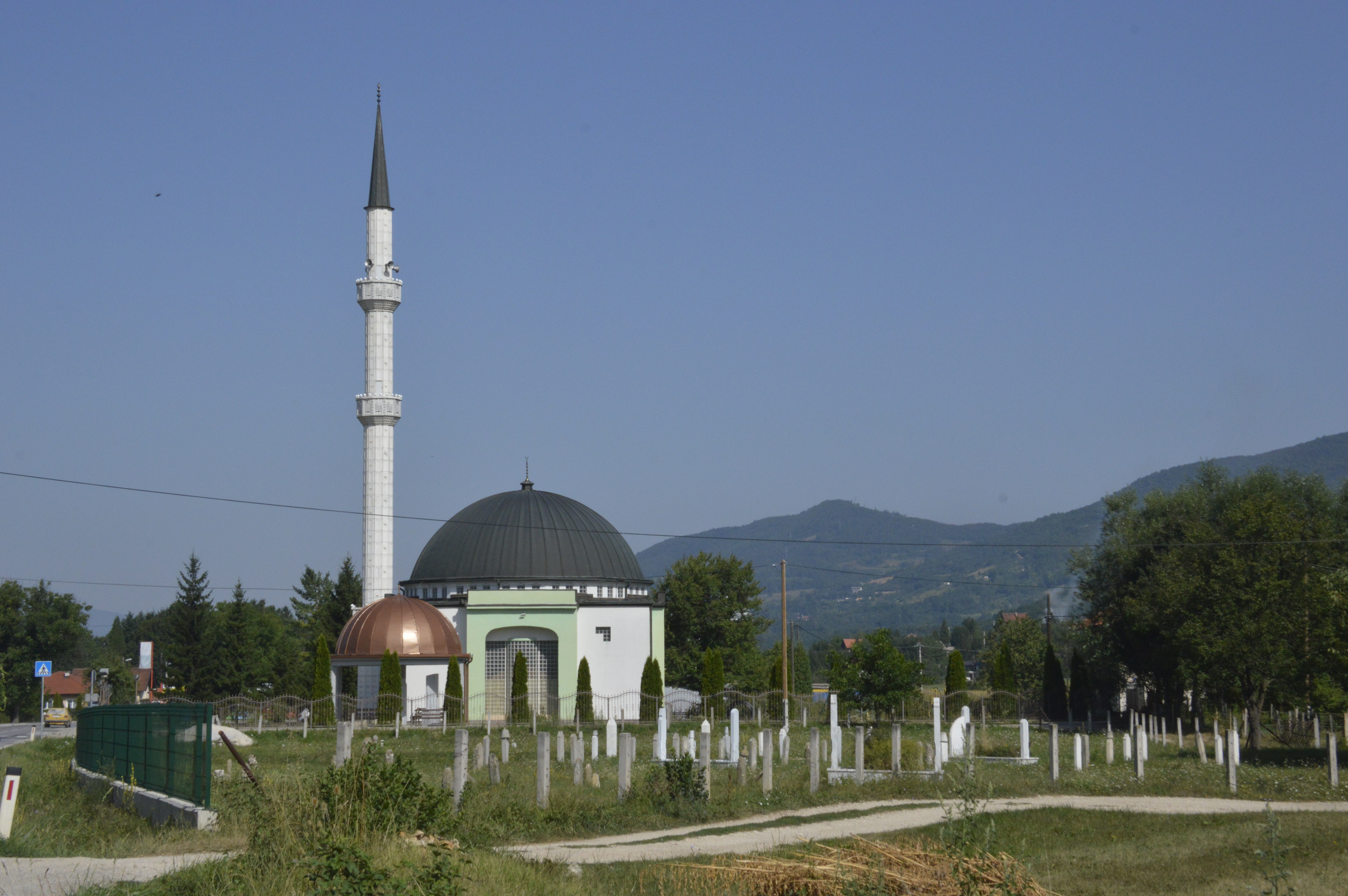

Han Ploča is a village in the municipality of Kiseljak, Bosnia and Herzegovina.

== Demographics ==
According to the 2013 census, its population was 371.

Ethnicity in 2013
Ethnicity	Number	Percentage
Bosniaks	216	58.2%
Croats	89	24.0%
Serbs	65	17.5%
other/undeclared	1	0.3%
Total	371	100%
