= Kazagići (Kiseljak) =

- Village
- Location within Bosnia and Herzegovina
- Coordinates: 44°01′29″N 18°02′15″E
- Country: Bosnia and Herzegovina
- Entity: Federation of Bosnia and Herzegovina
- Canton: Central Bosnia
- Municipality: Kiseljak

Area
  - Total: 0.70 sq mi (1.81 km^{2})

Population (2013)
  - Total: 166
  - Density: 238/sq mi (91.7/km^{2})
- Time zone: UTC+1 (CET)
  - Summer (DST): UTC+2 (CEST)

Kazagići is a village in the municipality of Kiseljak, in central Bosnia and Herzegovina.

== Demographics ==
According to the 2013 census, its population was 166.

Ethnicity in 2013
Ethnicity	Number	Percentage
Bosniaks	134	80.7%
Croats	31	18.7%
other/undeclared	1	0.6%
Total	166	100%
