= Gornja Višnjica =

Gornja Višnjica Горња Вишњица
- Village
- Location within Bosnia and Herzegovina
- Coordinates: 44°6′45″N 17°57′16″E
- Country: Bosnia and Herzegovina
- Entity: Federation of Bosnia and Herzegovina
- Canton: Zenica-Doboj
- Municipality: Zenica

Area
  - Total: 1.31 sq mi (3.39 km^{2})

Population (2013)
  - Total: 217
  - Density: 166/sq mi (64.0/km^{2})
- Time zone: UTC+1 (CET)
  - Summer (DST): UTC+2 (CEST)

Gornja Višnjica (Cyrillic: Горња Вишњица) is a village in the City of Zenica, Bosnia and Herzegovina.

== Demographics ==
According to the 2013 census, its population of 217 inhabitants was overwhelmingly Bosniak.

Ethnicity in 2013
Ethnicity	Number	Percentage
Bosniaks	209	96.3%
other/undeclared	8	3.7%
Total	217	100%
