= Rauševac =

Village in Kiseljak, Bosnia and Herzegovina

- Village
- Location within Bosnia and Herzegovina
- Coordinates: 44°00′N 18°03′E
- Country: Bosnia and Herzegovina
- Entity: Federation of Bosnia and Herzegovina
- Canton: Central Bosnia
- Municipality: Kiseljak

Area
  - Total: 0.77 sq mi (2.00 km^{2})

Population (2013)
  - Total: 300
  - Density: 390/sq mi (150/km^{2})
- Time zone: UTC+1 (CET)
  - Summer (DST): UTC+2 (CEST)

Rauševac is a village in the municipality of Kiseljak, Bosnia and Herzegovina.

== Demographics ==
According to the 2013 census, its population was 300.

Ethnicity in 2013
Ethnicity	Number	Percentage
Croats	220	73.3%
Bosniaks	77	25.7%
Serbs	1	0.3%
other/undeclared	2	0.7%
Total	300	100%
