= Clus Abbey =

Abbey in Lower Saxony, Germany

Coordinates: 51°53′10″N 10°00′29″E

Clus Abbey (Kloster Clus) was an abbey near Bad Gandersheim in Lower Saxony. It was a daughter-house of Gandersheim Abbey, having been founded in 1127 by Agnes, Abbess of Gandersheim, niece of the Emperor Henry IV, and was part of the Cluniac Reform movement.

== History ==
As its name suggests, Clus arose from the cell of a hermit. In 1124 Bishop Berthold I of Hildesheim consecrated the abbey, and the first monks came from the Imperial Abbey of Corvey on the Weser.

In 1433 Abbot Johann Dederoth also became abbot of Bursfelde Abbey and initiated the Bursfelde Congregation. In this way Clus Abbey stands at the beginning of the great central European monastic reform and unification movement.

In the course of the Reformation the abbey was dissolved in 1596. The former library is now part of the Herzog August Bibliothek in Wolfenbüttel.

== Abbey church ==
The former abbey church of Clus was built between 1127 and 1159 as a three-aisled basilica and shows some similarity to the abbey church at Gandersheim. In the choir, extended in the Gothic style in 1485, is a high altar which was brought here from Lübeck in 1487.
