= Stojkovići, Novi Travnik =

Stojkovići
- Village
- Location within Bosnia and Herzegovina
- Coordinates: 44.191266°N 17.6737244°E
- Country: Bosnia and Herzegovina
- Entity: Federation of Bosnia and Herzegovina
- Canton: Central Bosnia
- Municipality: Novi Travnik

Area
  - Total: 1.27 sq mi (3.28 km^{2})

Population (2013)
  - Total: 445
  - Density: 351/sq mi (136/km^{2})
- Time zone: UTC+1 (CET)
  - Summer (DST): UTC+2 (CEST)

Stojkovići is a village in the municipality of Novi Travnik, Bosnia and Herzegovina.

== Demographics ==
According to the 2013 census, its population was 445.

Ethnicity in 2013
| Ethnicity | Number | Percentage |
|---|---|---|
| Croats | 439 | 98.7% |
| Serbs | 3 | 0.7% |
| other/undeclared | 3 | 0.7% |
| Total | 445 | 100% |
