= Devetaci (Kiseljak) =

Devetaci Деветаци
- Village
- Location within Bosnia and Herzegovina
- Coordinates: 44°02′02″N 18°01′56″E
- Country: Bosnia and Herzegovina
- Entity: Federation of Bosnia and Herzegovina
- Canton: Central Bosnia
- Municipality: Kiseljak

Area
  - Total: 0.47 sq mi (1.23 km^{2})

Population (2013)
  - Total: 0
  - Density: 0.0/sq mi (0.0/km^{2})
- Time zone: UTC+1 (CET)
  - Summer (DST): UTC+2 (CEST)

Devetaci (Serbian Cyrillic: Деветаци) is a village in the municipality of Kiseljak, Bosnia and Herzegovina.

== Demographics ==
According to the 2013 census, its population was nil, down from 50 in 1991.
