= Višnjica (Kiseljak) =

- Village
- Location within Bosnia and Herzegovina
- Coordinates: 43°56′58″N 18°02′28″E
- Country: Bosnia and Herzegovina
- Entity: Federation of Bosnia and Herzegovina
- Canton: Central Bosnia
- Municipality: Kiseljak

Area
  - Total: 1.98 sq mi (5.14 km^{2})

Population (2013)
  - Total: 819
  - Density: 413/sq mi (159/km^{2})
- Time zone: UTC+1 (CET)
  - Summer (DST): UTC+2 (CEST)

Višnjica is a village in the municipality of Kiseljak, Bosnia and Herzegovina.

== Demographics ==
According to the 2013 census, its population was 819.

Ethnicity in 2013
Ethnicity	Number	Percentage
Bosniaks	653	79.7%
Croats	159	19.4%
Serbs	1	0.1%
other/undeclared	6	0.7%
Total	819	100%
