= Polje Višnjica =

- Village
- Location within Bosnia and Herzegovina
- Coordinates: 43°58′N 18°03′E
- Country: Bosnia and Herzegovina
- Entity: Federation of Bosnia and Herzegovina
- Canton: Central Bosnia
- Municipality: Kiseljak

Area
  - Total: 0.60 sq mi (1.55 km^{2})

Population (2013)
  - Total: 474
  - Density: 792/sq mi (306/km^{2})
- Time zone: UTC+1 (CET)
  - Summer (DST): UTC+2 (CEST)

Polje Višnjica is a village in the municipality of Kiseljak, Bosnia and Herzegovina.

== Demographics ==
According to the 2013 census, its population was 474.

Ethnicity in 2013
Ethnicity	Number	Percentage
Croats	330	69.6%
Bosniaks	140	29.5%
Serbs	2	0.4%
other/undeclared	2	0.4%
Total	474	100%
