= Čizma =

- Village
- Location within Bosnia and Herzegovina
- Coordinates: 43°56′N 18°05′E
- Country: Bosnia and Herzegovina
- Entity: Federation of Bosnia and Herzegovina
- Canton: Central Bosnia
- Municipality: Kiseljak

Area
  - Total: 1.51 sq mi (3.90 km^{2})

Population (2013)
  - Total: 320
  - Density: 210/sq mi (82/km^{2})
- Time zone: UTC+1 (CET)
  - Summer (DST): UTC+2 (CEST)

Čizma is a village in the municipality of Kiseljak, Bosnia and Herzegovina.

== Demographics ==
According to the 2013 census, its population was 320.

Ethnicity in 2013
Ethnicity	Number	Percentage
Croats	291	90.9%
Bosniaks	25	7.8%
Serbs	2	0.6%
other/undeclared	2	0.6%
Total	320	100%
