= Ravan, Bosnia and Herzegovina =

Ravan
- Village
- Location within Bosnia and Herzegovina
- Coordinates: 44.0813687°N 17.8619163°E
- Country: Bosnia and Herzegovina
- Entity: Federation of Bosnia and Herzegovina
- Canton: Central Bosnia
- Municipality: Busovača

Area
  - Total: 0.66 sq mi (1.71 km^{2})

Population (2013)
  - Total: 442
  - Density: 669/sq mi (258/km^{2})
- Time zone: UTC+1 (CET)
  - Summer (DST): UTC+2 (CEST)

Ravan is a village in the municipality of Busovača, Bosnia and Herzegovina.

== Demographics ==
According to the 2013 census, its population was 442.

Ethnicity in 2013
Ethnicity	Number	Percentage
Croats	432	97.70%
Bosniaks	10	2.3%
Total	442	100%
