= Kiseljak =

Kiseljak Кисељак
- Town and municipality
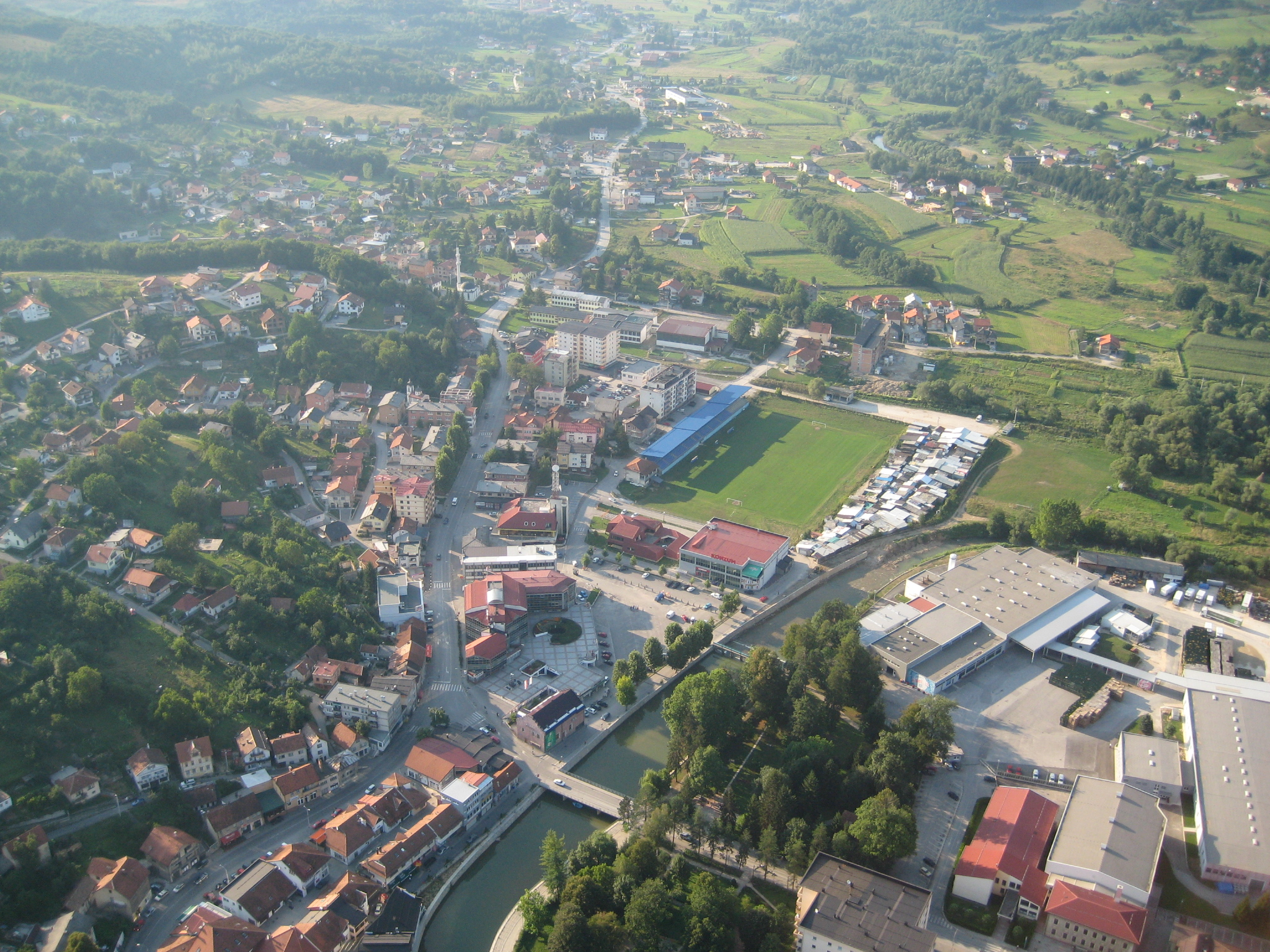
- Kiseljak

- Seal

- Location of Kiseljak within Bosnia and Herzegovina
- Coordinates: 43°56′35″N 18°04′39″E
- Country: Bosnia and Herzegovina
- Entity: Federation of Bosnia and Herzegovina
- Canton: Central Bosnia

Government
  - Municipal mayor: Mladen Mišurić-Ramljak (HDZ BiH)

Area
  - Town and municipality: 165 km^{2} (64 sq mi)

Population (2013 census)
  - Town and municipality: 20,722
  - Density: 133/km^{2} (340/sq mi)
  - Urban: 3,554
- Time zone: UTC+1 (CET)
  - Summer (DST): UTC+2 (CEST)
- Area code: +387 30
- Website: www.opcina-kiseljak.org

Kiseljak (Serbian Cyrillic: Кисељак) is a town and municipality located in Central Bosnia Canton of the Federation of Bosnia and Herzegovina, one of the two entities of Bosnia and Herzegovina. It lies in the valley of the Fojnica River, the Lepenica and the Kreševka River, which are a tributary of the Bosna, and it is on the intersection of roads from Visoko, Fojnica, Kreševo and Rakovica.

== Settlements ==
Riverside street in Kiseljak

- Azapovići
- Badnje
- Behrići
- Bilalovac
- Bliznice
- Boljkovići
- Borina
- Brizje
- Brnjaci
- Bukovica
- Buzuci
- Čalikovac
- Čizma
- Čubren
- Datići
- Demići
- Devetaci
- Doci
- Donji Palež
- Draževići
- Dubrave
- Dugo Polje
- Duhri
- Duke
- Gaj
- Gojakovac
- Gomionica
- Gornji Palež
- Gradac
- Grahovci
- Gromiljak
- Gunjače
- Hadrovci
- Han Ploča
- Hercezi
- Homolj
- Hrastovi
- Ivica
- Jehovac
- Katunište
- Kazagići
- Kiseljak
- Kotačala
- Kovači
- Krčevine
- Križići
- Kuliješ
- Lug
- Ljetovik
- Mahala Gomionica
- Mahala Višnjica
- Male Sotnice
- Markovići
- Maslinovići
- Medovci
- Medovići
- Miroševići
- Mrakovi
- Odrače
- Paretak
- Pariževići
- Pobrđe Milodraž
- Pobrđe Orahovo
- Podastinje
- Podastinjsko Brdo
- Polje Višnjica
- Potkraj
- Radanovići
- Radeljevići
- Rauševac
- Rotilj
- Solakovići
- Stojkovići
- Svinjarevo
- Šahinovići
- Toplica
- Tulica
- Velike Sotnice
- Višnjica
- Zabrđe
- Završje
- Žeželovo

== Demographics ==
=== 1971 ===
18,335 total

- Croats - 10,389 (56.66%)
- Bosniaks - 6,822 (37.20%)
- Serbs - 924 (5.03%)
- Yugoslavs - 55 (0.29%)
- Others - 145 (0.82%)

=== 1991 ===
In 1991 the population of the Kiseljak municipality (164 km^{2}) was 24,426, of which 51.61% were Croats, 40.92% Bosniaks, 3.11% Serbs, 2.48% Yugoslavs and 1.88% others. The town itself had a population of 6,598, of which 60% Croats, 29% Bosniaks, 3% Serbs, 5% Yugoslavs and 4% others.

=== 2013 Census ===
==== Town ====
Town	Nationality						Total
Town	Bosniaks	%	Croats	%	Serbs	%	Total
Kiseljak	477	13.42	2,853	80.28	115	3.24	3,554

==== Municipality ====
Municipality	Nationality						Total
Municipality	Bosniaks	%	Croats	%	Serbs	%	Total
Kiseljak	7,838	37.82	11,823	57.06	409	1.97	18,722

== Sports ==
The town is home to the football club NK Kiseljak.

== Notable people ==
- Branko Pleša, actor
- Jozo Penava, musician

== International relations ==
=== Twin towns – Sister cities ===
Kiseljak is twinned with:

- Kaštela, Croatia
- Kópháza, Hungary
- Zaprešić, Croatia
- Rakovski, Bulgaria
