= Rapti Bobani =

Rapti Bobani Рапти Бобани
- Village
- Location within Bosnia and Herzegovina
- Country: Bosnia and Herzegovina
- Entity: Republika Srpska; Federation of Bosnia and Herzegovina
- Canton: Herzegovina-Neretva
- Municipality: Trebinje; Ravno

Area
  - Total: 2.20 sq mi (5.69 km^{2})

Population (2013)
  - Total: 6
  - Density: 2.7/sq mi (1.1/km^{2})
- Time zone: UTC+1 (CET)
  - Summer (DST): UTC+2 (CEST)

Rapti Bobani (Serbian Cyrillic: Рапти Бобани) is a village in the municipality of Trebinje, Republika Srpska, Bosnia and Herzegovina and partially in the municipality of Ravno, Bosnia and Herzegovina.

== Demographics ==
According to the 2013 census, its population was 6, all Serbs with 4 living in the Trebinje part and two in the Ravno part.
