= Rotilj =

- Village
- Location within Bosnia and Herzegovina
- Coordinates: 43°56′N 18°03′E
- Country: Bosnia and Herzegovina
- Entity: Federation of Bosnia and Herzegovina
- Canton: Central Bosnia
- Municipality: Kiseljak

Area
  - Total: 1.69 sq mi (4.39 km^{2})

Population (2013)
  - Total: 224
  - Density: 132/sq mi (51.0/km^{2})
- Time zone: UTC+1 (CET)
  - Summer (DST): UTC+2 (CEST)

Rotilj is a village that is located in the municipality of Kiseljak, in Bosnia and Herzegovina.

== Demographics ==
According to the 2013 census, its population was 224.

Ethnicity in 2013
Ethnicity	Number	Percentage
Bosniaks	163	72.77%
Croats	61	27.23%
Total	224	100%
