= Cismar Abbey =

Benedictine monastery in Germany

Coordinates: 54°11′24″N 10°59′09″E

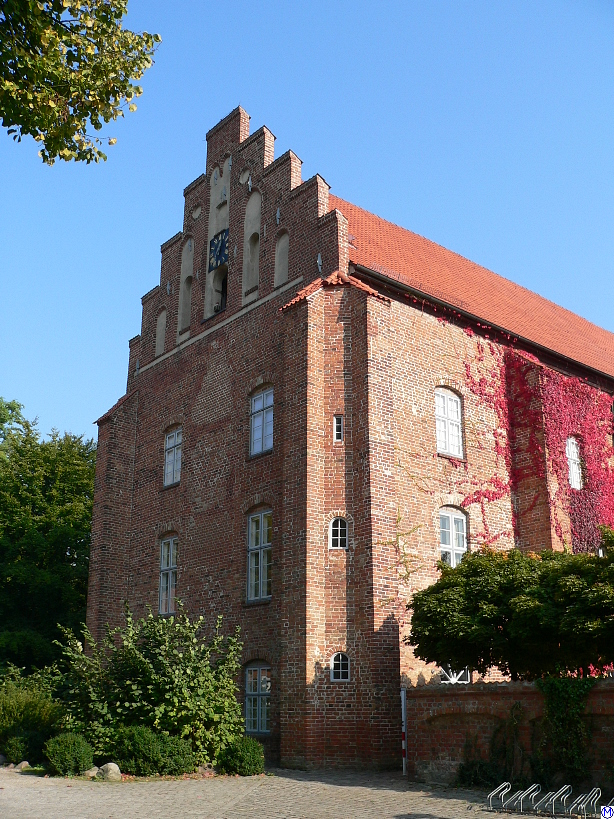
Cismar Abbey church: the west front

Cismar Abbey (German: Kloster Cismar) was a Benedictine monastery located at Cismar near Grömitz, Schleswig-Holstein, in Germany.

== History ==
The abbey was founded in 1238 by Count Adolf IV of Holstein as alternative accommodation for Benedictine monks from Lübeck. In the mid-15th century it was one of the six original members of the influential Bursfelde Congregation, a Benedictine reform movement. After three prosperous centuries, based largely on its possession of a relic of the blood of Christ and a healing spring dedicated to John the Baptist, which made it a centre of pilgrimage, it was dissolved in 1561 during the secularisation brought about by the Reformation. The monastic library is preserved in the Danish Royal Library in Copenhagen.

The Brick Gothic abbey church is famous for its carved altar, dating from the early 14th century, still in place in the church.

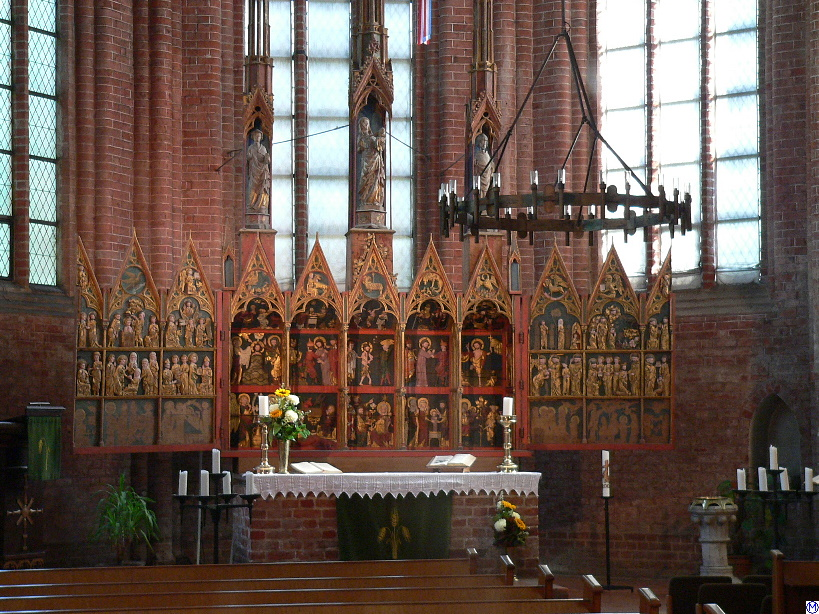
Cismar Abbey church: the altar

The other surviving buildings, after a wide variety of secular uses, now serve as a museum.
