= Radići, Bosnia and Herzegovina =

Radići
- Village
- Location within Bosnia and Herzegovina
- Coordinates: 43.6875°N 18.9789°E
- Country: Bosnia and Herzegovina
- Entity: Federation of Bosnia and Herzegovina
- Region Canton: East Sarajevo; Bosnian-Podrinje Goražde
- Municipality: Novo Goražde; Goražde

Area
  - Total: 0.46 sq mi (1.20 km^{2})

Population (2013)
  - Total: 6
  - Density: 13/sq mi (5.0/km^{2})
- Time zone: UTC+1 (CET)
  - Summer (DST): UTC+2 (CEST)

Radići is a village in the municipalities of Novo Goražde, Republika Srpska and Goražde, Bosnia and Herzegovina.

== Demographics ==
According to the 2013 census, its population was six, all Serbs living in the Goražde part, thus none in the Novo Goražde part.
