= Runjići =

- Village
- Location within Bosnia and Herzegovina
- Coordinates: 44.2490444°N 17.581894°E
- Country: Bosnia and Herzegovina
- Entity: Federation of Bosnia and Herzegovina
- Canton: Central Bosnia
- Municipality: Travnik

Area
  - Total: 0.71 sq mi (1.85 km^{2})

Population (2013)
  - Total: 162
  - Density: 227/sq mi (87.6/km^{2})
- Time zone: UTC+1 (CET)
  - Summer (DST): UTC+2 (CEST)

Runjići is a village in the municipality of Travnik, Bosnia and Herzegovina.

== Demographics ==
According to the 2013 census, its population was 162.

Ethnicity in 2013
Ethnicity	Number	Percentage
Bosniaks	142	87.7%
Croats	14	8.6%
other/undeclared	6	3.7%
Total	162	100%
