= Novi Travnik =

Novi Travnik Нови Травник
- City
- Grad Novi Travnik; Град Нови Травник; City of Novi Travnik
- Flag Coat of arms

- Location of Novi Travnik in Bosnia and Herzegovina

- Location within Bosnia and Herzegovina
- Coordinates: 44°10′29.35″N 17°39′48.34″E
- Country: Bosnia and Herzegovina
- Entity: Federation of Bosnia and Herzegovina
- Canton: Central Bosnia

Government
  - Mayor: Stjepan Dujo (HDZ BiH)

Area
  - Municipality: 242 km^{2} (93 sq mi)
  - Land: 242 km^{2} (93 sq mi)
  - Water: 0 km^{2} (0 sq mi)

Population (2013)
  - Municipality: 25,107
  - Density: 104/km^{2} (269/sq mi)
  - Urban: 9,008
- Time zone: UTC+1 (CET)
  - Summer (DST): UTC+2 (CEST)
- Post code: 72290
- Area code: +387 030
- Website: www.ont.gov.ba

Novi Travnik (Serbian Cyrillic: Нови Травник) is a city located in the Central Bosnia Canton within the Federation of Bosnia and Herzegovina. As of the 2013 census, it had a population of 9,008, while the entire municipality had 23,832 inhabitants.

== Name ==
Novi Travnik was renamed "Pucarevo" in 1980 to honor Đuro Pucar, a key Yugoslav communist leader. However, in 1992, with the breakup of Yugoslavia and the beginning of the Bosnian War, the town's original name, Novi Travnik, was restored.

== History ==
During the Bosnian War in the 1990s, Novi Travnik experienced fierce fighting as it became a contested area between different factions. The conflict, especially in June 1993, saw clashes between the Army of the Republic of Bosnia and Herzegovina (ARBiH) and the Croatian Defense Council (HVO).

While the town has since rebuilt and evolved, its population remains predominantly Bosniak and Croat, though there is now a bit more diversity.

As of January 2015, the municipality has nine National Monuments of Bosnia and Herzegovina, among which are seven stećak necropolises, one mosque and the Necropolis for the victims of Fascism.

== Demographics ==
=== Novi Travnik Municipality ===
Novi Travnik Municipality
census year	2013	1991	1981	1971
Bosniaks	12,067 (50.63%)	11,625 (37.85%)	9,164 (35.03%)	8,200 (35.89%)
Croats	11,002 (46.16%)	12,162 (39.59%)	10,548 (40.33%)	9,852 (43.12%)
Serbs	367 (1.53%)	4,097 (13.33%)	3,521 (13.46%)	4,129 (18.07%)
Yugoslavs by nat.		2,132 (6.94%)	2,308 (8.82%)	301 (1.31%)
others and unknown	396 (1.66%)	697 (2.26%)	613 (2.34%)	365 (1.59%)
total	23,832	30,713	26,154	22,847

=== Novi Travnik proper ===
Novi Travnik
census year	2013	1991	1981	1971
Serbs	329 (3.65%)	3,200 (27.77%)	2,464 (29.08%)	2,897 (43.36%)
Bosniaks	3624 (40.23%)	3,176 (27.56%)	1,783 (21.04%)	1,415 (21.17%)
Croats	4815 (53.45%)	2,751 (23.87%)	1,985 (23.42%)	1,778 (26.61%)
Yugoslavs by nat.	(N/A)	1,887 (16.37%)	1,899 (22.41%)	275 (4.11%)
others and unknown	240 (2.66%)	508 (4.40%)	342 (4.03%)	316 (4.72%)
total	9,008	11,522	8,473	6,681

== Notable residents ==
- Marijan Šunjić (1798–1860), born in Bučići – 19th century Bosnian Franciscan, Roman Catholic Bishop (Apostolic Vicar in Bosnia), educator. A street in Novi Travnik and a primary school in Stojkovići were named after him.
- Jozo Križanović (1944–2009), born in Vitez – Croat member of the Presidency of Bosnia and Herzegovina (2001–2002), lived in Novi Travnik for a long period of time, mostly before the Yugoslav Wars.
