= List of settlements in the Federation of Bosnia and Herzegovina/C =

List of settlements in the Federation of Bosnia and Herzegovina - C
Settlement	City or municipality	Canton
Carev Do	Fojnica	
Carevo Polje	Jajce	
Carica	Busovača	
Cazin		
Cebara	Tomislavgrad	
Ceribašići	Bugojno	
Cerići		
Cerno		
Crnac	Bosansko Grahovo	
Crne Lokve	Široki Brijeg	
Crni Lug	Bosansko Grahovo	
Crni Vrh	Glamoč	
Crni Vrh	Konjic	
Crniče	Bugojno	
Crkvenjak	Kreševo	
Crkvice	Uskoplje	
Crnički Kamenik	Kreševo	
Crnići	Čapljina	
Crnići	Kreševo	
Crnići-Greda	Stolac	
Crnići-Kula	Stolac	
Crnopod		
Crveni Grm		
Crvenice	Tomislavgrad	
Crvica	Goražde	
Cvilin (part)		
Cvitović	Jajce	
Cvrče	Uskoplje	
