= 2024 Bosnia and Herzegovina floods =

Natural disaster in Bosnia and Herzegovina

- Date: 3–4 October 2024
- Location: Bosnia and Herzegovina (mainly, Jablanica, Fojnica, Kreševo, Kiseljak and Konjic)
- Deaths: 27

During the night of 3–4 October 2024, central and southern Bosnia and Herzegovina experienced severe flooding, the worst since the 2014 Southeast Europe floods, due to an atmospheric river formed over the Adriatic Sea. Several central towns were flooded, and numerous towns and villages became inaccessible as roads, bridges, and railways were obstructed by floodwaters and landslides. Twenty-seven people were confirmed dead.

== Impact ==
Deaths by location
Place	Canton	Deaths
Jablanica	Herzegovina-Neretva	19
Konjic	Herzegovina-Neretva	5
Fojnica	Central Bosnia	3

In several towns and surrounding areas, flash floods and landslides caused the collapse of homes while residents were still inside. A spokesperson for the Herzegovina-Neretva Canton described the situation as the worst crisis since the Bosnian War, urging residents to avoid travel to the towns of Jablanica and Konjic. Kiseljak, Kreševo, and Fojnica in Central Bosnia were also cut off by floodwaters, with landslides posing ongoing risks to nearby villages including Vranići and Kojsina. Many settlements between Fojnica and Kiseljak remained inaccessible, with bridges destroyed in places like Gunjani near Kreševo. In Ostrožac, near Jablanica, a landslide rendered the railway inoperable. Residents of Gojevići near Fojnica narrowly escaped flash floods, and in Buturović Polje near Konjic, several people were swept away by the torrent, resulting in two fatalities.

The village of Donja Jablanica sustained the most severe damage, with 19 deaths. Several buildings were entirely buried by landslides. The local mosque's minaret and dome were the only structures protruding from the rubble created by the landslide. Federal Prime Minister Nermin Nikšić reported that the landslide in Donja Jablanica may have been initiated by a nearby quarry, and an investigation into the cause is underway. According to Nikšić, it was not possible to predict the landslide or evacuate the village in time. Additional fatalities were reported, including three in Fojnica and five in Konjic.

=== Croatia and Montenegro ===
There was comparatively minor flooding in neighbouring Croatia, where flash flood warnings were issued for 3–4 October. Gračac and Krk broke their all-time records for daily rainfall, at 249.1 and 192 mm (9.81 and 7.56 in), respectively. The rivers Sava, Kupa and Odra rose due to rainfall. Localised flooding was reported in Ogulin on 4 October and 23 houses were flooded in the Karlovac area during the following night. Floods were also reported in Montenegro, with buildings being swept away by large streams of water.

== Rescue operations and aftermath ==
The Government of the Federation of Bosnia and Herzegovina initially announced 14 deaths in Jablanica and one in Fojnica in a special press conference; "numerous" other missing persons were reported by their families. The Sarajevo–Mostar magistral road was closed due to flood damage. The Ministry of Defence deployed helicopters and one EUFOR helicopter was confirmed to have rescued a child amid the debris left by the flood in Jablanica. The Federal Civil Protection Agency is coordinating the rescue efforts.

The Sarajevo Canton police blocked traffic to the Herzegovina–Neretva Canton and the BIHAMK automobile association advised travelers from northern Bosnia to Herzegovina to detour around affected areas. The country's Central Election Commission announced that the 2024 municipal elections were to proceed as planned on 6 October. Many political parties canceled their election rallies due to the floods.

On 5 October, electricity was restored to some areas in the Herzegovina–Neretva Canton. There are plans to repair downed power lines to reach the intact buildings in the Jablanica area. According to Elektroprivreda BiH, major damage was averted at three hydroelectric power plants on the river Neretva. Repairs of the railway in Ostrožac are expected to take a couple of months and will cause "enormous damage" to businesses and to the Federal Railways. The Agency for Watershed of the Adriatic Sea issued a new warning for a round of severe rainfall for 9–10 October in an area including Jablanica and Konjic, which could exacerbate the effects of the flood.

The country's entity governments, as well as the government of the Brčko District, proclaimed 8 October a national day of mourning.

The Herzegovina–Neretva Canton prosecutor's office opened an investigation into the quarry above Donja Jablanica. According to the cantonal premier, the cantonal government did not issue a concession agreement to the quarry.

== Relief efforts and humanitarian aid ==
Twelve countries offered help through the EU Civil Protection Mechanism, which was activated by Bosnia and Herzegovina on 5 October. Teams from Croatia, Slovenia, Montenegro, Serbia and the United Kingdom participated in the rescue efforts. The European Union provided satellite photos from the Copernicus Programme to help the authorities estimate damages. Albania, Hungary, Montenegro, Romania and Turkey provided materials for emergency shelters through an EU programme. Kosovo allocated €200,000 to support Bosnia and Herzegovina in its recovery from the floods.

The Croatian Bishops' Conference donated €100,000 to Caritas Bosnia and Herzegovina for the flooded areas. The Government of Croatia sent €10 million in aid, together with 37 members of the Croatian Mountain Rescue Service (HGSS) in flooded areas. Caritas Croatia launched a humanitarian campaign ”Pruži ruku” (”Offer your hand”) for the victims, in which €230,000 was raised.

== See also ==
- 2014 Southeast Europe floods, which severely affected Bosnia and Herzegovina
- 2021 Bosnia and Herzegovina floods
- 2024 Central European floods, preceding the Bosnia and Herzegovina floods by a few weeks
- 2024 European floods
- 2024–25 European windstorm season § Storm Cassandra (Finny)
