= Kravica incident =

The Kravica incident can refer to several events in the Bosnian village of Kravica:

- 1991 incident in Kravica, an ethnically motivated shooting
- Kravica attack (1993), an attack on Srebrenica-based Bosnian units on Bosnian Serb positions in the village
- Kravica massacre (1995), executions of Bosniaks of Srebrenica by the Bosnian Serb military
