= Bosnia and Herzegovina floods =

Bosnia and Herzegovina floods may refer to:

- 2014 Southeast Europe floods
- 2021 Bosnia and Herzegovina floods
- 2024 Bosnia and Herzegovina floods
