= Battle for Meoršje =

- Part of the Croat–Bosniak War and Bosnian War
Date	4 October 1993
Location	Meoršje, Bosnia and Herzegovina
Result	Croat Victory

Belligerents
Croatian Republic of Herzeg-Bosnia	Republic of Bosnia and Herzegovina

Units involved
HVO	ARBiH

Casualties and losses
67 killed, 114 wounded	+100 killed

The Battle for Meoršje began on 4 October 1993, one of the key skirmishes between Croatian Republic of Herzeg-Bosnia and Republic of Bosnia and Herzegovina for the fate of the Kreševo region and the entire Lepenica Valley. It ended with the victory of the forces of the Croatian Defense Council and marked a turning point in this area.

== Battle ==
The attack was started by the ARBiH, whose goal was to put pressure on the Croats from the Kreševo. But the HVO responded boldly, stopping the ARBiH offensive and pushed them back. In the end the HVO captured the peak of Meoršje, which gave the HVO an advantage and a better tactical view. During the defense of Kreševo from the attack of ARBiH, 67 Croatian defenders were killed, 114 were wounded, and one is still listed as missing. With the capture of Meoršje, the danger of the fall of Kreševo was definitely removed, so even though there were other important ones, the anniversary of the mentioned battle is specially celebrated every year.
