= Jahorina =

Mountain in Bosnia and Herzegovina

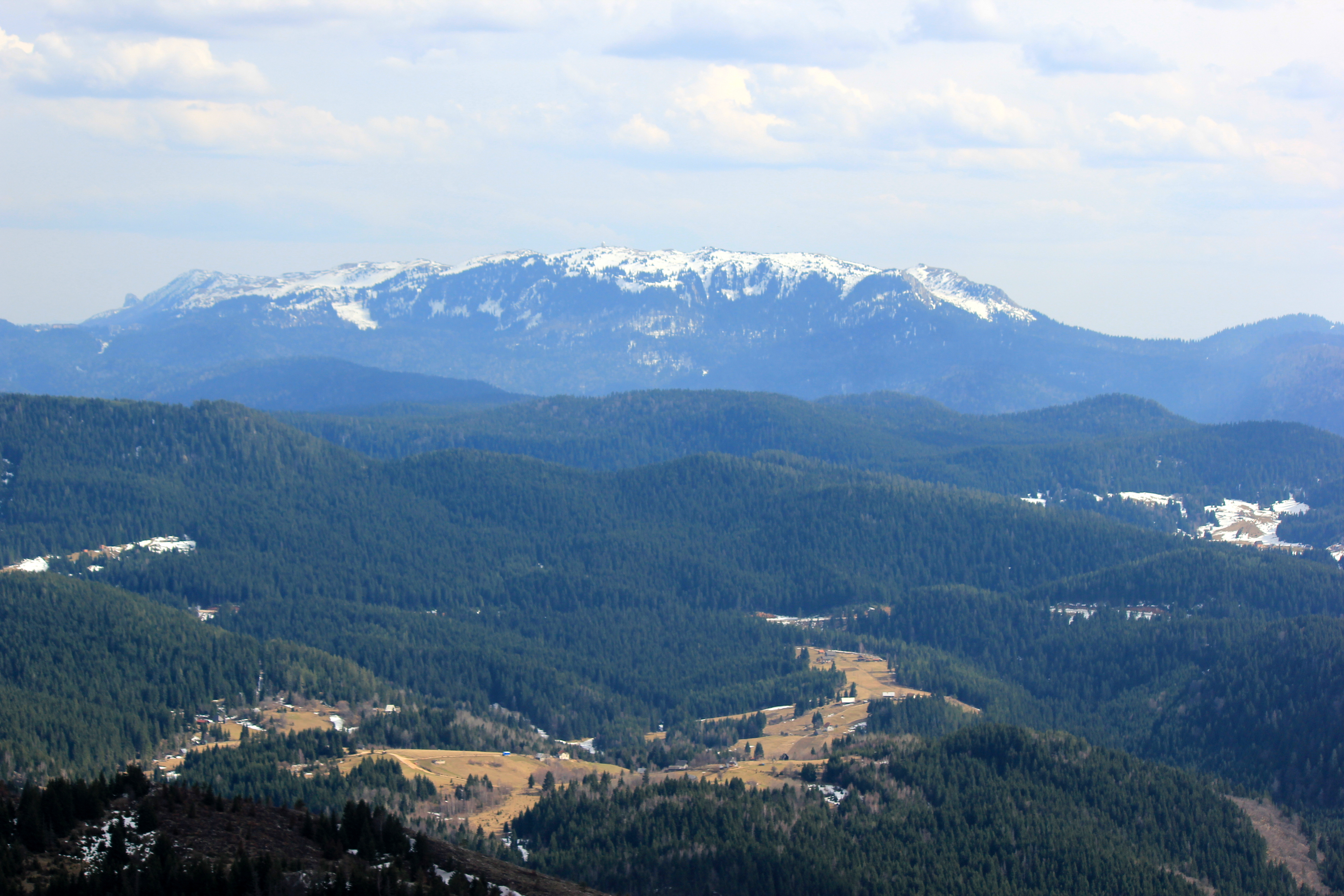
- Jahorina peaks seen from Trebević

Highest point
- Elevation: 1,916 m (6,286 ft)
- Coordinates: 43°41′35″N 18°36′51″E

Geography
- Location within Bosnia and Herzegovina
- Location: Bosnia and Herzegovina
- Parent range: Dinaric Alps

Jahorina (Serbian Cyrillic: Јахорина, pronounced [jâxɔrina]) is a mountain in Bosnia and Herzegovina, located at the tripoint of the municipalities of Pale, Trnovo, Republika Srpska and Trnovo, Federation of Bosnia and Herzegovina. Part of the Dinaric Alps, it borders Mount Trebević. Its highest peak Ogorjelica has a summit elevation of 1,916 metres (6,286 ft), making it the second-highest of Sarajevo's mountains, after Bjelašnica at 2,067 m (6,781 ft).

The Jahorina ski resort located on the mountain hosted the women's alpine skiing events of the 1984 Winter Olympics.

== History ==
=== Bosnian War ===
During the Bosnian War, the Republika Srpska used Jahorina as a military base during their 3-year long siege of Sarajevo. The Special Police Brigade established a "special police training centre" on the area's grounds. Many of the Jahorina Centre's officers were later arrested for their involvement in the Srebrenica massacre, especially during one of the massacre's last phases, the Kravica massacre.

=== 21st century ===
In 2021, Bosnian Serb political leader, Milorad Dodik, was reported to have carried out "anti-terrorism" drills in the area on behalf of the Republika Srpska, sparking controversy. Critics accused Dodik of threatening Bosnia's stability, while his supporters argued it was legal. The operation occurred during a political crisis in Bosnia, leading to Dodik responding that the blueprint for the drills had begun years earlier, claiming it had nothing to do with Bosnia's political tensions.

== Ski resort ==
The Jahorina ski resort is situated on the slopes of Jahorina. It is the largest and the most popular ski resort in Bosnia and Herzegovina, and a destination for alpine skiing, snowboarding, hiking, and sledding.

== Landmine risk ==
Jahorina was an area of major strategic importance during the Bosnian war. Some areas of the mountain, including areas near the resort, still contain land mines. However, most of the minefields are located at the southern side of the mountain, while the resort is on the north side. Extensive de-mining activities have taken place after the war. Skiing in borders of Jahorina ski resort is safe from mines and out-of-bounds areas are marked by skull-and-crossbones signs. Some off-course slopes were mined during the war and many remain risky. On October 30, 2011, a Slovenian paraglider was critically injured on Mount Jahorina when he landed in a minefield by mistake.

== See also ==
- Tourism in Bosnia and Herzegovina

== Bibliography ==
- Poljak, Željko (February 1959). "Jahorina". Kazalo za "Hrvatski planinar" i "Naše planine" 1898—1958 (PDF). Naše planine (in Croatian). Vol. XI. p. 23. ISSN 0354-0650.
- Guber, Mihovil (1943). "Pustošenje planinarskih objekata u južnoj Hrvatskoj" [The Desolation of Mountain Objects in Southern Croatia] (PDF). Hrvatski planinar (in Croatian). Vol. 39, no. 6–7. pp. 85–93. ISSN 0354-0650.
