= Botunja, Kreševo =

Botunja
- Village
- Location within Bosnia and Herzegovina
- Coordinates: 43.8512172°N 18.0848307°E
- Country: Bosnia and Herzegovina
- Entity: Federation of Bosnia and Herzegovina
- Canton: Central Bosnia
- Municipality: Kreševo

Area
  - Total: 1.05 sq mi (2.73 km^{2})

Population (2013)
  - Total: 109
  - Density: 103/sq mi (39.9/km^{2})
- Time zone: UTC+1 (CET)
  - Summer (DST): UTC+2 (CEST)

Botunja is a village in the municipality of Kreševo, Bosnia and Herzegovina.

== Demographics ==
According to the 2013 census, its population was 109, all Bosniaks.
