= 2021 Bosnia and Herzegovina floods =

Natural disaster in Bosnia and Herzegovina

2021 floods in Bosnia and Herzegovina
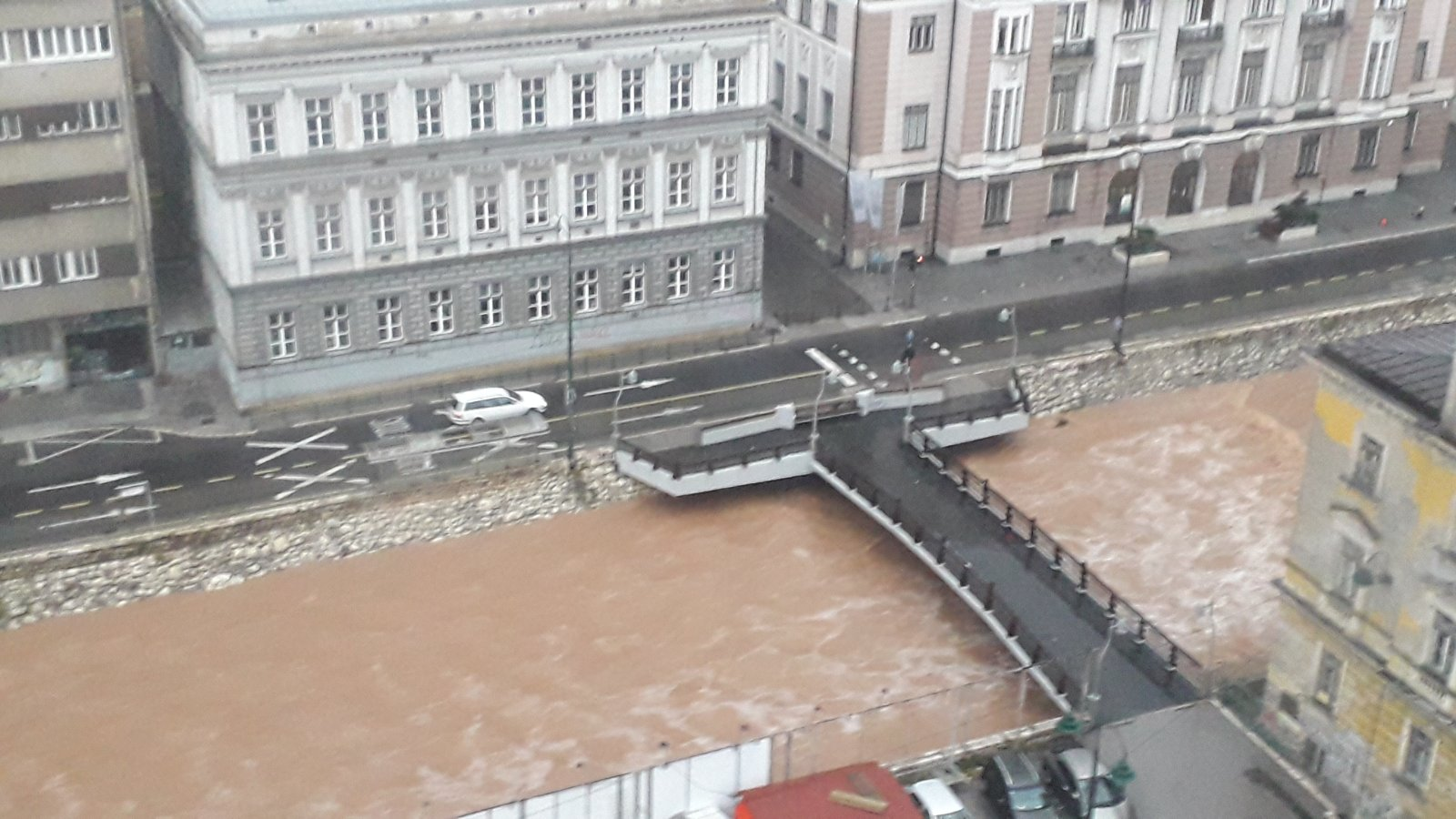
- The river Miljacka's strong current during a non-stop cloudy day in Sarajevo
- Date: 4–11 November 2021
- Location: Bosnia and Herzegovina
- Deaths: 0

Between 4 and 11 November 2021, heavy rainfall resulted in widespread flash flooding in many places across Bosnia and Herzegovina. The Federal Hydrometereological Institute issued a red warning on 5 November 2021 for flooding. There was great material damage.

The first wave of floods started in the night of 4–5 November and caused many rivers to flood or have their levels significantly increased. Hundreds of objects were at least partially flooded. The settlement of Otes was hit the hardest, where fire cars were used to evacuate tens of people and sandbags placed to prevent houses from flooding. The rain was forecast to not completely stop until Monday, 8 November 2021. Many villages in Sarajevo Canton were submerged and the A1 motorway was closed. The waters were receding during 6 and 7 November, except in the city of Doboj, where there was a slight increase. A few unexploded bombs were found in previously flooded regions.

== Affected regions ==
=== Sarajevo region ===
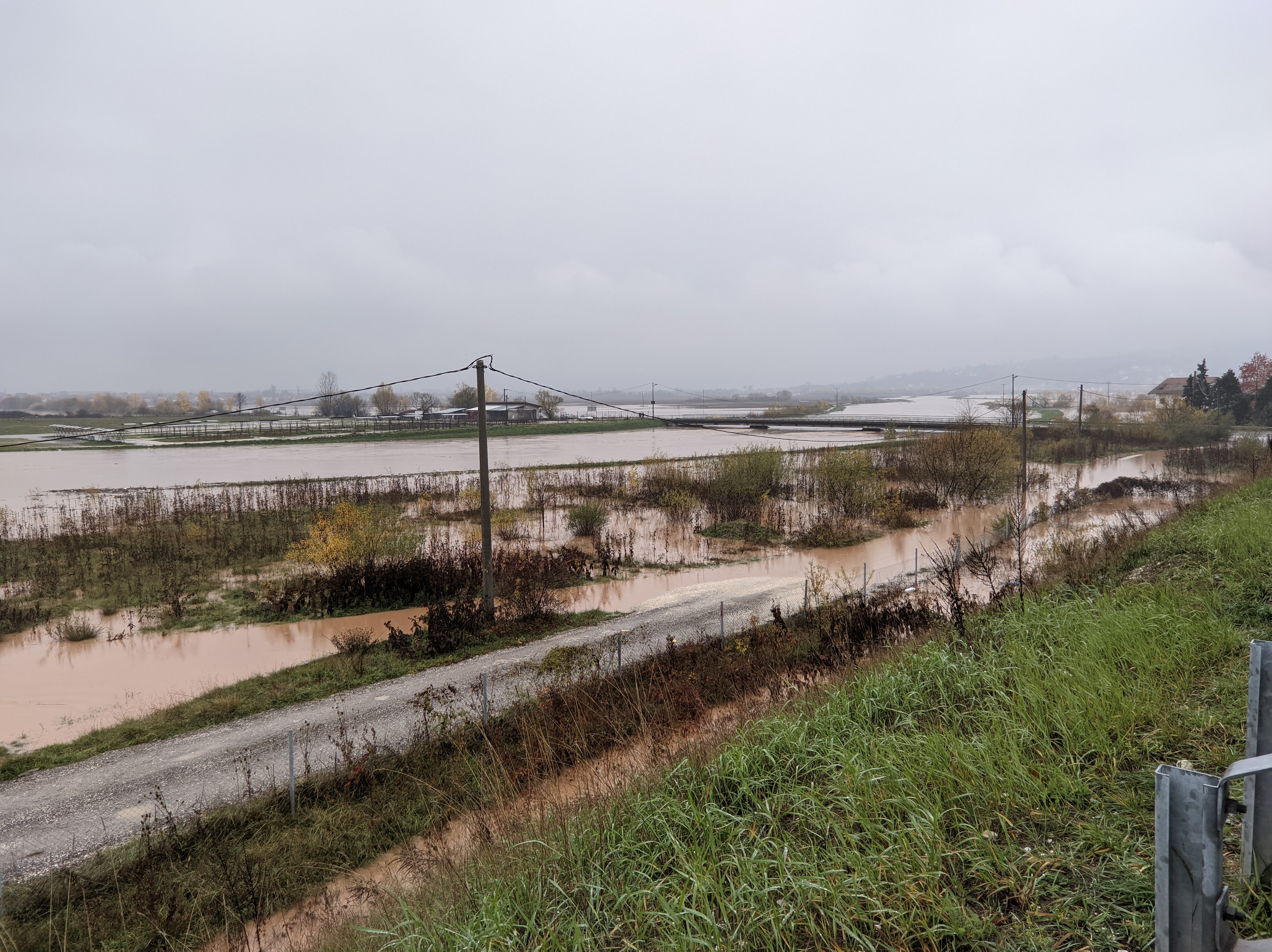
A flooded area near Sarajevo

The capital Sarajevo was impacted by the floods the most. The main roadways in Sarajevo were under water, causing traffic slowdowns. The flooding hit Otes the most. Many houses were flooded and some cars were stuck in the water. Firefighters, the police, the Agency for Civil Protection of the Sarajevo Canton (as well as the municipal agencies), and volunteers managed the situation. There was a shortage of manpower and not all affected objects were quickly helped. Traffic between Otes and the rest of the city was cut off by the floods. The rivers Željeznica and the Tilava flooded Butmir and Gornji Kotorac, where tens of objects were affected. The bridge Most spasa (Salvation bridge) connecting Butmir and the neighbourly settlement Sokolović Kolonija was submerged. There had been traffic obstructions on the routes connecting Boljakov Potok, Pofalići, and Stup. Floods were contained in Stari Grad owing to high responsiveness and cleaning of surface drains. Schools were closed in Ilidža, where volunteer actions to set up sandbags took place. The rivers were slowly receding to their riverbeds between 6 and 11 November.

The promenade Vilsonovo Šetalište was closed. The river Željeznica eroded land near it. Nearby objects were at risk of collapsing into the river because of this. Sandbags were set up in Butmir. Vlakovo was heavily flooded. The Miljacka was close to submerging some bridges. The Reljevo powergrids malfunctioned which caused a blackout in most of Sarajevo for a few hours. Its electricity output was unstable, particularly in Ilidža. The oxygen plant of the company Meser was flooded. Great damage was done to the Jahorina Ski Resort as well.

Households lost electricity access in Foča and the water there was not potable for a short period of time. Voznica in Hadžići was flooded, although buildings were not affected. Experts had been warning there would be serious consequences to deforestation. It had an impact on the scale of the floods, as well as on river springs. 150 houses were endangered by the floods in Vojkovići, East Ilidža. Nine people were evacuated from the village of Kijevo, and the Foča–Trnovo road got partially destroyed.

The Institute of Public Health in the Sarajevo Canton advised against drinking tap water. The Government of Sarajevo Canton declared the end of the state of natural emergency, due to floods, on 26 November.

=== Central Bosnia Canton ===
The Bosna and the Fojnica's levels had been rising, but no residential buildings were impacted in the Central Bosnia Canton.

=== Herzegovina-Neretva Canton ===
The river level of the Neretva in Konjic reached a record high at 04:00 local time where there were floods and the roads were under water. Citizens in the city of Mostar were advised to boil their water, which was not safe for consumption. Tens of residences, and local roads in the Konjic municipality were flooded, and there were issues with electricity and pipeline water transport in some villages. The village of Hotovlje was cut off from regional traffic. The level of the Buna was the highest since measurements began in 1923, at 195 cm (6.40 ft), and many buildings in Blagaj were also flooded. Eventually, the river level of the Neretva lowered and roads were unblocked in the Konjic municipality.

The Neretva had been filled with trash, a problem during heavier rainfall noted for years, caused by unregulated disposal near the river.

=== Tuzla Canton ===
The Spreča flooded 10 hectares of the valley in Sprečko polje, near Gračanica, on 9 November 2021. The water level was 304 cm (9.97 ft).

=== Zenica-Doboj Canton ===
Local roads in Visoko were flooded which caused traffic obstructions. The Bosna flooded Kakanj, Povezice, Malješ and Doboj. Low-lying farmlands and residences were also flooded. From 6 until 11 November, the river waters had receded. Regular traffic resumed.

== International response ==
- Croatia — Croatia's Foreign and European Affairs Minister Gordan Grlić-Radman offered help in repairing the flood damage in Bosnia and Herzegovina.

== See also ==
- 2014 Southeast Europe floods
- 2024 Bosnia and Herzegovina floods
