= Alagići =

- Village
- Location within Bosnia and Herzegovina
- Coordinates: 43.8872°N 18.0494°E
- Country: Bosnia and Herzegovina
- Entity: Federation of Bosnia and Herzegovina
- Canton: Central Bosnia
- Municipality: Kreševo

Area
  - Total: 0.53 sq mi (1.37 km^{2})

Population (2013)
  - Total: 258
  - Density: 488/sq mi (188/km^{2})
- Time zone: UTC+1 (CET)
  - Summer (DST): UTC+2 (CEST)

Alagići is a village in the municipality of Kreševo, Bosnia and Herzegovina.

== Demographics ==
According to the 2013 census, its population was 258.

Ethnicity in 2013
Ethnicity	Number	Percentage
Croats	255	98.8%
Serbs	1	0.4%
other/undeclared	2	0.8%
Total	258	100%
