= Drežnice =

- Village
- Location within Bosnia and Herzegovina
- Coordinates: 43.8740421°N 18.0753975°E
- Country: Bosnia and Herzegovina
- Entity: Federation of Bosnia and Herzegovina
- Canton: Central Bosnia
- Municipality: Kreševo

Area
  - Total: 0.41 sq mi (1.06 km^{2})

Population (2013)
  - Total: 68
  - Density: 170/sq mi (64/km^{2})
- Time zone: UTC+1 (CET)
  - Summer (DST): UTC+2 (CEST)

Drežnice is a village in the municipality of Kreševo, Bosnia and Herzegovina.

== Demographics ==
According to the 2013 census, its population was 68, all Croats.
