= Komari =

- Village
- Location within Bosnia and Herzegovina
- Coordinates: 43.899429°N 18.05451°E
- Country: Bosnia and Herzegovina
- Entity: Federation of Bosnia and Herzegovina
- Canton: Central Bosnia
- Municipality: Kreševo

Area
  - Total: 0.44 sq mi (1.14 km^{2})

Population (2013)
  - Total: 50
  - Density: 110/sq mi (44/km^{2})
- Time zone: UTC+1 (CET)
  - Summer (DST): UTC+2 (CEST)

Komari is a village in the municipality of Kreševo, Bosnia and Herzegovina.

== Demographics ==
According to the 2013 census, its population was 50, all Croats.
