= Rakova Noga =

Village in Central Bosnia

- Village
- Location within Bosnia and Herzegovina
- Coordinates: 43.9021657°N 18.0243232°E
- Country: Bosnia and Herzegovina
- Entity: Federation of Bosnia and Herzegovina
- Canton: Central Bosnia
- Municipality: Kreševo

Area
  - Total: 2.28 sq mi (5.91 km^{2})

Population (2013)
  - Total: 386
  - Density: 169/sq mi (65.3/km^{2})
- Time zone: UTC+1 (CET)
  - Summer (DST): UTC+2 (CEST)

Rakova Noga is a village in the municipality of Kreševo, Bosnia and Herzegovina.

== Demographics ==
According to the 2013 census, its population was 386.

Ethnicity in 2013
Ethnicity	Number	Percentage
Croats	308	79.8%
Bosniaks	56	14.5%
other/undeclared	22	5.7%
Total	386	100%
