= Kreševski Kamenik =

- Village
- Location within Bosnia and Herzegovina
- Coordinates: 43.8811006°N 18.0416588°E
- Country: Bosnia and Herzegovina
- Entity: Federation of Bosnia and Herzegovina
- Canton: Central Bosnia
- Municipality: Kreševo

Area
  - Total: 0.99 sq mi (2.56 km^{2})

Population (2013)
  - Total: 177
  - Density: 179/sq mi (69.1/km^{2})
- Time zone: UTC+1 (CET)
  - Summer (DST): UTC+2 (CEST)

Kreševski Kamenik is a village in the municipality of Kreševo, Bosnia and Herzegovina.

== Demographics ==
According to the 2013 census, its population was 177.

Ethnicity in 2013
Ethnicity	Number	Percentage
Croats	171	96.6%
other/undeclared	6	3.4%
Total	177	100%
