= Bukva =

- Village
- Location within Bosnia and Herzegovina
- Coordinates: 43.8991176°N 18.0969318°E
- Country: Bosnia and Herzegovina
- Entity: Federation of Bosnia and Herzegovina
- Canton: Central Bosnia
- Municipality: Kreševo

Area
  - Total: 1.36 sq mi (3.51 km^{2})

Population (2013)
  - Total: 99
  - Density: 73/sq mi (28/km^{2})
- Time zone: UTC+1 (CET)
  - Summer (DST): UTC+2 (CEST)

Bukva is a village in the municipality of Kreševo, Bosnia and Herzegovina.

== Demographics ==
According to the 2013 census, its population was 99.

Ethnicity in 2013
Ethnicity	Number	Percentage
Croats	61	61.6%
Bosniaks	37	37.4%
other/undeclared	1	1.0%
Total	99	100%
