= Vranci =

- Village
- Location within Bosnia and Herzegovina
- Coordinates: 43.855998°N 18.0067712°E
- Country: Bosnia and Herzegovina
- Entity: Federation of Bosnia and Herzegovina
- Canton: Central Bosnia
- Municipality: Kreševo

Area
  - Total: 9.30 sq mi (24.08 km^{2})

Population (2013)
  - Total: 65
  - Density: 7.0/sq mi (2.7/km^{2})
- Time zone: UTC+1 (CET)
  - Summer (DST): UTC+2 (CEST)

Vranci is a village in the municipality of Kreševo, Bosnia and Herzegovina.

== Demographics ==
According to the 2013 census, its population was 65.

Ethnicity in 2013
Ethnicity	Number	Percentage
Croats	63	96.9%
Bosniaks	1	1.5%
Serbs	1	1.5%
Total	65	100%
