= Stojčići =

- Village
- Location within Bosnia and Herzegovina
- Coordinates: 43.8763684°N 18.0551183°E
- Country: Bosnia and Herzegovina
- Entity: Federation of Bosnia and Herzegovina
- Canton: Central Bosnia
- Municipality: Kreševo

Area
  - Total: 0.54 sq mi (1.39 km^{2})

Population (2013)
  - Total: 448
  - Density: 835/sq mi (322/km^{2})
- Time zone: UTC+1 (CET)
  - Summer (DST): UTC+2 (CEST)

Stojčići is a village in the municipality of Kreševo, Bosnia and Herzegovina.

== Demographics ==
According to the 2013 census, its population was 448.

Ethnicity in 2013
Ethnicity	Number	Percentage
Croats	441	98.4%
Serbs	2	0.4%
other/undeclared	5	1.1%
Total	448	100%
