= Donja Jablanica =

- Village
- Location within Bosnia and Herzegovina
- Country: Bosnia and Herzegovina
- Entity: Federation of Bosnia and Herzegovina
- Canton: Herzegovina-Neretva
- Municipality: Jablanica

Area
  - Total: 3.94 sq mi (10.21 km^{2})

Population (2013)
  - Total: 440
  - Density: 110/sq mi (43/km^{2})
- Time zone: UTC+1 (CET)
  - Summer (DST): UTC+2 (CEST)

Donja Jablanica is a village in the municipality of Jablanica, Bosnia and Herzegovina. During the 2024 Bosnia and Herzegovina floods, a quarry above the village collapsed, with debris being swept through Donja Jablanica. At least 21 people died.

== Demographics ==
According to the 2013 census, its population was 440.

Ethnicity in 2013
Ethnicity	Number	Percentage
Bosniaks	429	97.5%
Croats	1	0.2%
other/undeclared	10	2.3%
Total	440	100%
