= Bjelovići =

- Village
- Location within Bosnia and Herzegovina
- Coordinates: 43.8856487°N 18.0144309°E
- Country: Bosnia and Herzegovina
- Entity: Federation of Bosnia and Herzegovina
- Canton: Central Bosnia
- Municipality: Kreševo

Area
  - Total: 3.08 sq mi (7.97 km^{2})

Population (2013)
  - Total: 180
  - Density: 58/sq mi (23/km^{2})
- Time zone: UTC+1 (CET)
  - Summer (DST): UTC+2 (CEST)

Bjelovići is a village in the municipality of Kreševo, Bosnia and Herzegovina.

== Demographics ==
According to the 2013 census, its population was 180.

Ethnicity in 2013
Ethnicity	Number	Percentage
Croats	135	75.0%
Bosniaks	45	25.0%
Total	180	100%
