= Franciscan friary, Kreševo =

Religious house

Saint Catharine
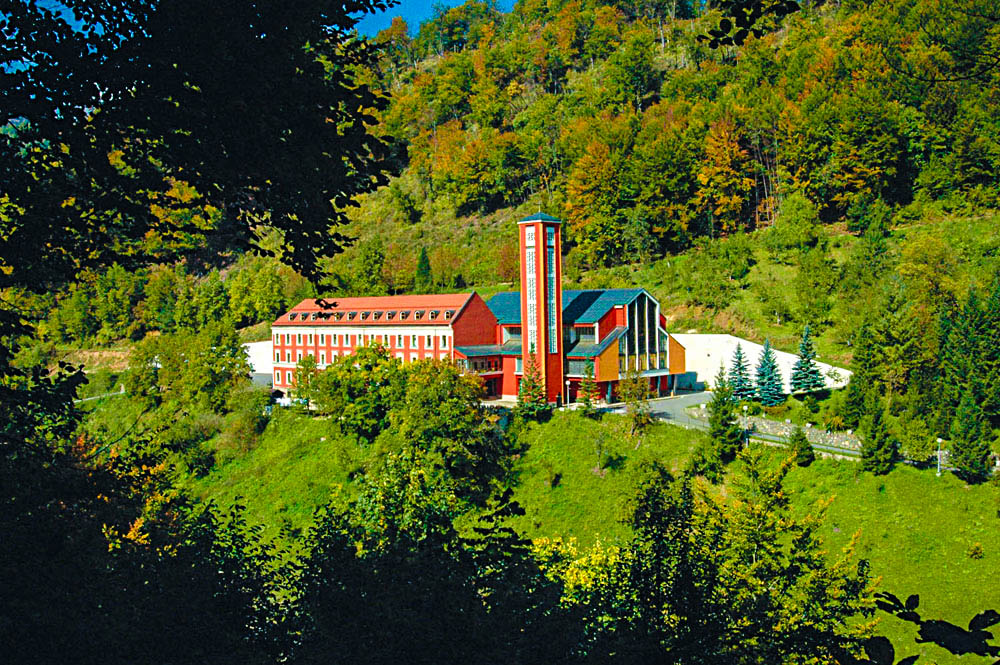
- Interactive map of Saint Catharine

Monastery information
- Order: Franciscan
- Established: 1521 or 1524
- Dedication: Holy Spirit
- Diocese: Roman Catholic Archdiocese of Vrhbosna

Architecture
- Heritage designation

KONS of Bosnia and Herzegovina
- Official name: The architectural ensemble of the Franciscan monastery in Kreševo together with its movable property
- Type: Category I cultural and historical property
- Criteria: II. Value; A, B, C iii.iv., D ii.iii.iv., E ii.iii.v., F ii.iii., G iii.vi.
- Designated: 3 July 2003 (session No. -, Sarajevo)
- Reference no.: 327
- Decision no.: 08.1-6-526/03-4
- Listed: List of National Monuments of Bosnia and Herzegovina
- Operator: Franciscan friary Kreševo

Site
- Location: Kreševo, Bosnia and Herzegovina
- Website: www.samostan-kresevo.com

The Franciscan friary of St. Catharine, or Franciscan monastery of St. Catharine, in Kreševo, Bosnia and Herzegovina, was established between 1521 and 1524. The monastery has been serving its community for centuries, and the Catholic traditions here are very strong.

== National monument and heritage ==
The monastery has a rustic museum, library and gallery. The monastery as an architectural ensemble, together with a number of its movable property and items, is being included into the List of National Monuments of Bosnia and Herzegovina since 2003.

== Notables ==
A memorial chamber dedicated to Fra Grga Martić was created after his death within the monastery.

Famous student of the seminary in Kreševo include Albanian poet Gjergj Fishta.

== See also ==
- Franciscan Province of Bosna Srebrena
