= Deževice =

- Village
- Location within Bosnia and Herzegovina
- Coordinates: 43.8561874°N 17.956213°E
- Country: Bosnia and Herzegovina
- Entity: Federation of Bosnia and Herzegovina
- Canton: Central Bosnia
- Municipality: Kreševo

Area
  - Total: 13.31 sq mi (34.48 km^{2})

Population (2013)
  - Total: 72
  - Density: 5.4/sq mi (2.1/km^{2})
- Time zone: UTC+1 (CET)
  - Summer (DST): UTC+2 (CEST)

Deževice is a village in the municipality of Kreševo, Bosnia and Herzegovina.

== Demographics ==
According to the 2013 census, its population was 72, all Croats.
