= Mratinići =

Village in Bosnia and Herzegovina

- Village
- Location within Bosnia and Herzegovina
- Coordinates: 43.8692029°N 18.069165°E
- Country: Bosnia and Herzegovina
- Entity: Federation of Bosnia and Herzegovina
- Canton: Central Bosnia
- Municipality: Kreševo

Area
  - Total: 3.07 sq mi (7.96 km^{2})

Population (2013)
  - Total: 416
  - Density: 135/sq mi (52.3/km^{2})
- Time zone: UTC+1 (CET)
  - Summer (DST): UTC+2 (CEST)

Mratinići is a village in the municipality of Kreševo, Bosnia and Herzegovina.

== Demographics ==
According to the 2013 census, its population was 416.

Ethnicity in 2013
Ethnicity	Number	Percentage
Croats	206	49.5%
Bosniaks	205	49.3%
Serbs	2	0.5%
other/undeclared	3	0.7%
Total	416	100%
