= Crnići =

- Village
- Location within Bosnia and Herzegovina
- Coordinates: 43.9033°N 17.9985°E
- Country: Bosnia and Herzegovina
- Entity: Federation of Bosnia and Herzegovina
- Canton: Central Bosnia
- Municipality: Kreševo

Area
  - Total: 3.45 sq mi (8.93 km^{2})

Population (2013)
  - Total: 328
  - Density: 95.1/sq mi (36.7/km^{2})
- Time zone: UTC+1 (CET)
  - Summer (DST): UTC+2 (CEST)

Crnići is a village in the municipality of Kreševo, Bosnia and Herzegovina.

== Demographics ==
According to the 2013 census, its population was 328.

Ethnicity in 2013
Ethnicity	Number	Percentage
Bosniaks	239	72.9%
Croats	86	26.2%
Serbs	2	0.6%
other/undeclared	1	0.3%
Total	328	100%
