= Vodovoji =

- Village
- Location within Bosnia and Herzegovina
- Coordinates: 43.894874°N 18.0557107°E
- Country: Bosnia and Herzegovina
- Entity: Federation of Bosnia and Herzegovina
- Canton: Central Bosnia
- Municipality: Kreševo

Area
  - Total: 1.25 sq mi (3.25 km^{2})

Population (2013)
  - Total: 49
  - Density: 39/sq mi (15/km^{2})
- Time zone: UTC+1 (CET)
  - Summer (DST): UTC+2 (CEST)

Vodovoji is a village in the municipality of Kreševo, Bosnia and Herzegovina.

== Demographics ==
According to the 2013 census, its population was 49.

Ethnicity in 2013
| Ethnicity | Number | Percentage |
|---|---|---|
| Croats | 48 | 98.0% |
| other/undeclared | 1 | 2.0% |
| Total | 49 | 100% |
