= Vidosovići =

Village in Central Bosnia

- Village
- Location within Bosnia and Herzegovina
- Coordinates: 43.8335226°N 18.0389951°E
- Country: Bosnia and Herzegovina
- Entity: Federation of Bosnia and Herzegovina
- Canton: Central Bosnia
- Municipality: Kreševo

Area
  - Total: 3.04 sq mi (7.87 km^{2})

Population (2013)
  - Total: 7
  - Density: 2.3/sq mi (0.89/km^{2})
- Time zone: UTC+1 (CET)
  - Summer (DST): UTC+2 (CEST)

Vidosovići is a village in the municipality of Kreševo, Bosnia and Herzegovina.

== Demographics ==
According to the 2013 census, its population was 7, all Bosniaks.
