= 1991 Kravica shooting =

- Part of the breakup of Yugoslavia
- Location: Kravica, Bratunac, SR Bosnia and Herzegovina, SFR Yugoslavia
- Date: 3 September 1991
- Target: Bosniak civilians
- Attack type: Shooting, ambush
- Deaths: 2
- Injuries: 2

A shooting occurred on 3 September 1991 in the village of Kravica near Bratunac, in eastern Bosnia and Herzegovina, when four Bosniak men travelling through the village were ambushed by armed assailants, resulting in the deaths of two individuals and the wounding of two others. It marked one of the earliest serious episodes of ethnically motivated violence in the territory of Bosnia and Herzegovina during the breakup of Yugoslavia.

== Background ==
During 1991, political tensions in Bosnia and Herzegovina increased as the Socialist Federal Republic of Yugoslavia began to disintegrate. The rise of competing nationalist movements among Bosniaks, Serbs, and Croats was accompanied by growing political polarization in eastern Bosnia, particularly in the municipalities along the Drina River.

In the Bratunac region, relations between local communities deteriorated amid concerns over the future constitutional status of Bosnia and Herzegovina and the wider conflicts that had already erupted in Croatia. By the summer of 1991, reports emerged of weapons being distributed to sections of the local Serb population in eastern Bosnia. Testimony presented before the International Criminal Tribunal for the former Yugoslavia (ICTY) indicated that arms were transported into the region from Serbia and that local political leaders and activists were increasingly involved in security and mobilization activities.

== Incident ==
On the evening of 3 September 1991, four Bosniak men travelling along the Zvornik–Bratunac road near the hamlet of Kajići in Kravica were fired upon by armed attackers. Dževad Jusić and Nedžad Hodžić were killed, while Mevludin Sinanović and Zaim Salković survived with injuries.

According to online magazines, the perpetrators were Radenko Milanović (known as "Mali Rašo") from Kravica, and Marko Marković (known as "Kobra") from Crnča, municipality of Ljubovija in Serbia. The accomplices were employees of the Ministry of Internal Affairs: Dragan Ilić, Pero Milić and Vidoje Radović.

== Aftermath ==
The suspects were never delivered to Bosnian authorities. Following the incident, they participated in the Croatian War of Independence alongside Serb rebels until late March 1992 when they were involved in the establishment of the Crisis Staff and the formation of the first Serbian units prior to the Bosnian War. In 2006, the District Court in Bijeljina confirmed an indictment against Radenko Milanović, and Milomir Cvjetinović for the two murders. The court alleged that the two, along with Marko Marković, had planned to murder Mevludin Sinanović who survived. Since then, there has been no progress in the case. Marko Marković has since died in a car accident.

In ICTY proceedings, Džemal Bećirović, one of the founders of the Party of Democratic Action (SDA) in Bratunac claimed that the murders of Jusić and Hodžić were carried out on the orders of the Serb Democratic Party (SDS) for the Bratunac municipality, in order to exacerbate tensions between Bosniaks and Serbs in this area.

The incident generated significant fear among the Bosniak population of the area and contributed to a further deterioration of inter-ethnic relations in the municipality of Bratunac. It marked the first inter-ethnic conflict casualties in Bosnia and Herzegovina during the breakup of Yugoslavia. According to Adis Maksić, it was the first recorded case of ethnically motivated murder in Bosnia and Herzegovina since World War II. As a result, ethnic tensions grew, with Muslims avoiding Serb-populated areas. Some one thousand Serbs fled to Serbia, fearing reprisals. Many Muslims also moved to areas which were more densely populated with other Muslims.
