= Kojsina =

- Village
- Location within Bosnia and Herzegovina
- Coordinates: 43.8658446°N 18.0110293°E
- Country: Bosnia and Herzegovina
- Entity: Federation of Bosnia and Herzegovina
- Canton: Central Bosnia
- Municipality: Kreševo

Area
  - Total: 0.96 sq mi (2.49 km^{2})

Population (2013)
  - Total: 178
  - Density: 185/sq mi (71.5/km^{2})
- Time zone: UTC+1 (CET)
  - Summer (DST): UTC+2 (CEST)

Kojsina is a village in the municipality of Kreševo, Bosnia and Herzegovina.

== Demographics ==
According to the 2013 census, its population was 178, all Croats.
