= Otes, Bosnia and Herzegovina =

Coordinates: 43.840°N 18.297°E

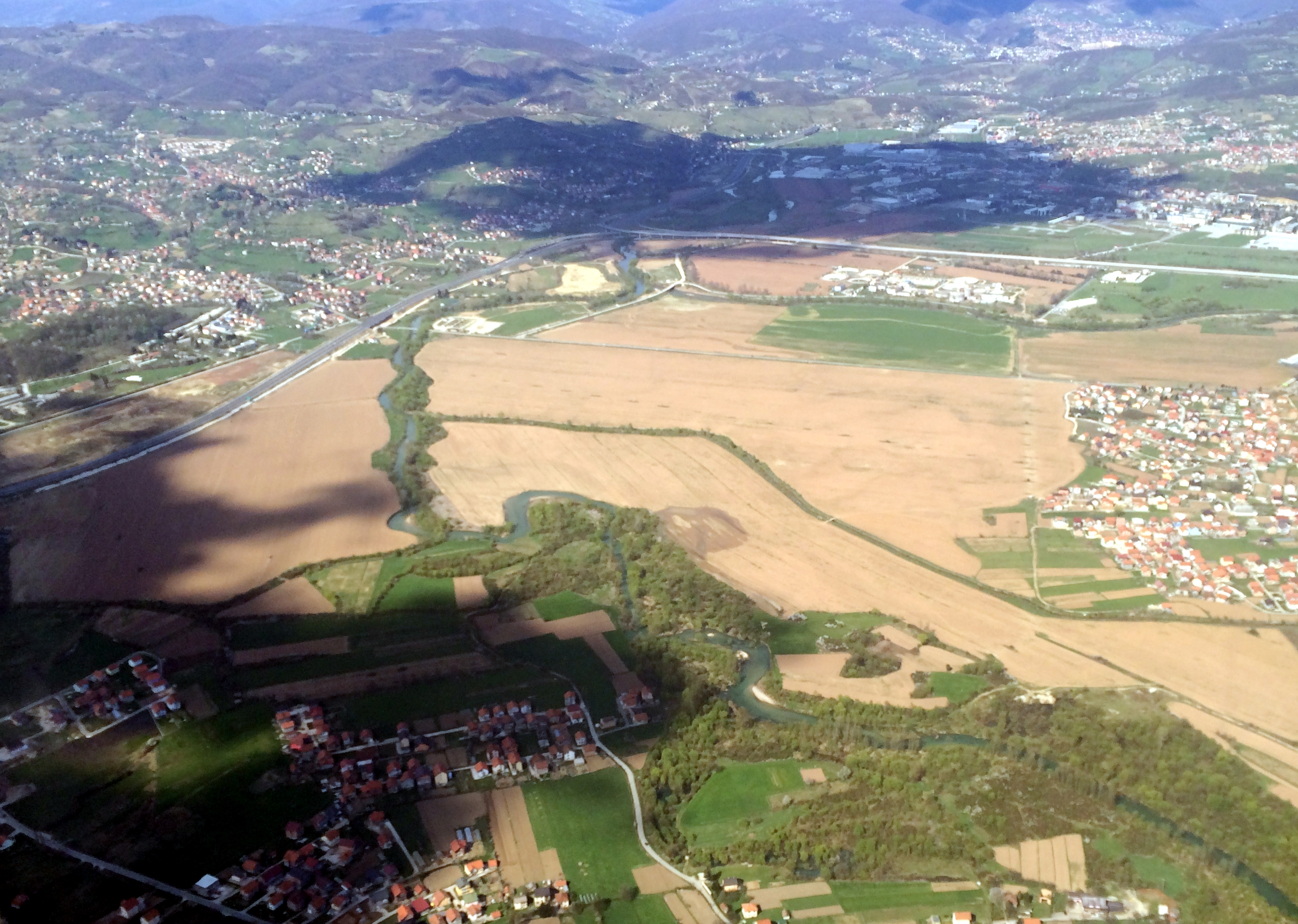
Otes with the river Bosna and Novi Grad in the background

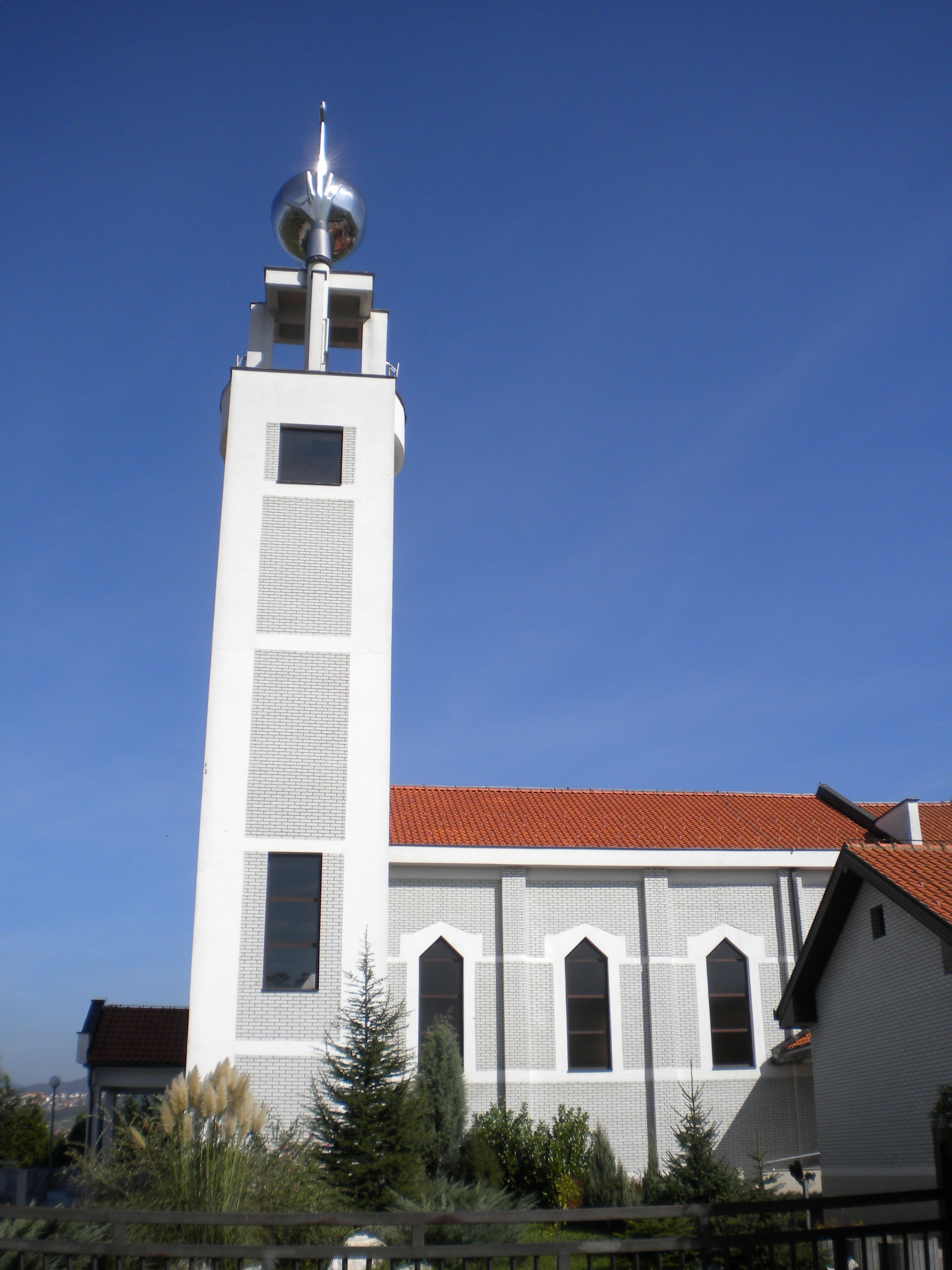
Roman Catholic church in Otes

Otes (Cyrillic: Отес) is a settlement in the municipality of Ilidža, Bosnia and Herzegovina. It is bordered by Pejton, Vreoca, Osjek, Doglodi and Stup. The territory has 5,000 inhabitants and an area of 155 ha. It is located between the Sarajevo–Ploče railway and the rivers Dobrinja, Željeznica and Bosna.

== Notable residents ==
- Muhidin Hamamdžić, principal of Sarajevo
- Hamid Guska, head coach of the Bosnia and Herzegovina national boxing team
- Haris Medunjanin, footballer
- Sulejman Kulović, footballer
- Anita Kajasa Memović, actor

== Sports ==
Until 1992, Otes had an amateur football club called "Mladost“. The team competed in lower amateur leagues with clubs like Vraca, Jahorina Prača, Omladinac, Kalinovik, Pjenovac, etc. The last generation was coached by Davor Miler and key players were Hajrudin "Zeka" Kološ (captain), Enver "Enko" Redžepović, Nedžad "Antara" Mujičić and Ivan Budes.
