= Crkvenjak =

- Village
- Location within Bosnia and Herzegovina
- Coordinates: 43.8991°N 18.0969°E
- Country: Bosnia and Herzegovina
- Entity: Federation of Bosnia and Herzegovina
- Canton: Central Bosnia
- Municipality: Kreševo

Area
  - Total: 1.56 sq mi (4.05 km^{2})

Population (2013)
  - Total: 60
  - Density: 38/sq mi (15/km^{2})
- Time zone: UTC+1 (CET)
  - Summer (DST): UTC+2 (CEST)

Crkvenjak is a village in the municipality of Kreševo, Bosnia and Herzegovina.

== Demographics ==
According to the 2013 census, its population was 60.

Ethnicity in 2013
Ethnicity	Number	Percentage
Croats	46	76.7%
Bosniaks	13	21.7%
other/undeclared	1	1.7%
Total	60	100%
