= Crnići-Kula =

- Village
- Location within Bosnia and Herzegovina
- Coordinates: 43.1378°N 17.8505°E
- Country: Bosnia and Herzegovina
- Entity: Federation of Bosnia and Herzegovina
- Canton: Herzegovina-Neretva
- Municipality: Stolac

Area
  - Total: 1.78 sq mi (4.62 km^{2})

Population (2013)
  - Total: 570
  - Density: 320/sq mi (120/km^{2})
- Time zone: UTC+1 (CET)
  - Summer (DST): UTC+2 (CEST)

Crnići-Kula is a village in the municipality of Stolac, Bosnia and Herzegovina.

== Demographics ==
According to the 2013 census, its population was 570.

Ethnicity in 2013
Ethnicity	Number	Percentage
Croats	484	84.9%
Bosniaks	83	14.6%
other/undeclared	3	0.5%
Total	570	100%
