= Jahorina Ski Resort =

Ski resort in Bosnia and Herzegovina

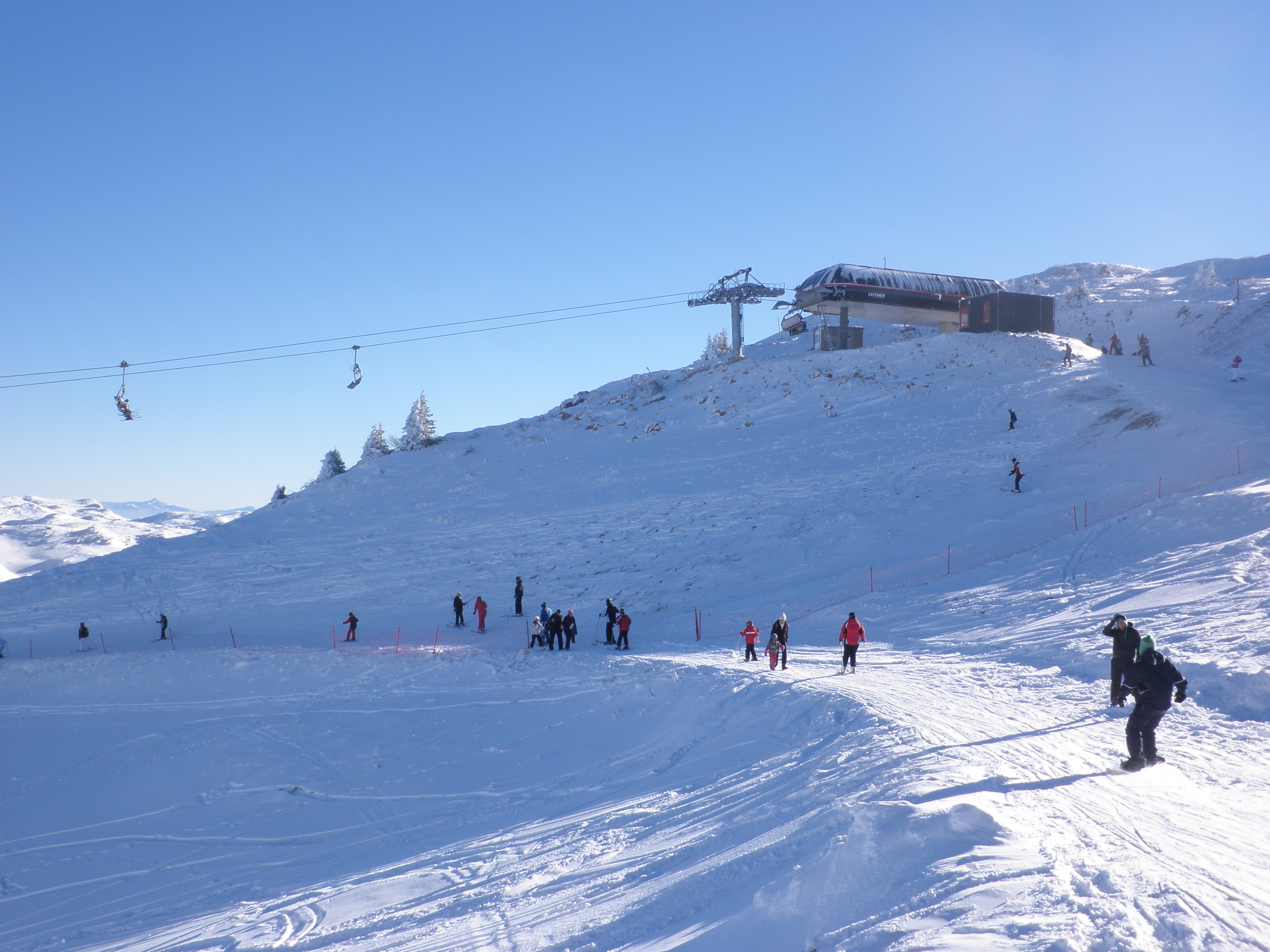
- Jahorina Ski Resort

- Location within Bosnia and Herzegovina
- Location: Jahorina Mountain, Dinaric Alps
- Nearest city: Pale, Republika Srpska, Bosnia and Herzegovina
- Coordinates: 43°44′12″N 18°33′59″E
- Vertical: 616 m (2,021 ft)
- Top elevation: 1,916 m (6,286 ft)
- Base elevation: 1,300 m (4,300 ft)
- Skiable area: 40 km (25 mi)
- Longest run: 2 km (1.2 mi)
- Lift system: 11 total
- Lift capacity: 13,000/hour
- Snowfall: 175 days
- Snowmaking: Yes
- Night skiing: Yes
- Website: www.oc-jahorina.com/en/

Jahorina Ski Resort or Jahorina Ski Center (Serbian: Ски-центар Јахорина, romanized: Ski-centar Jahorina), officially named Jahorina Olympic Center (Олимпијски центар Јахорина, Olimpijski centar Jahorina), is a mountain resort and the largest and most popular winter tourism resort in Bosnia and Herzegovina.

The ski resort on the slopes of Jahorina mountain in Dinaric Alps is located 15 km (9.3 mi) from the municipality of Pale in the Republika Srpska entity and 30 km (19 mi) from the Sarajevo International Airport. During the 1984 Winter Olympics, it hosted the alpine skiing competition.

== History ==
The first written documents recorded skiing on Jahorina mountain in the late 19th century during the Austro-Hungarian rule. The origins of organized tourism on Jahorina trace back to 1923, the founding year of the ski resort. Between the First and the Second World War, ski jumps and a mountain lodge were constructed at Jahorina. The first Yugoslav ski rally was held at Jahorina in 1937.

After World War II, Jahorina hosted the "International Students Winter Week" in 1955, a forerunner to the Winter Universiade that would start five years later in Chamonix, France.

The Jahorina ski resort was the site of the Women's Alpine Winter Olympic competitions during the 1984 Winter Olympics, that took place from 8 to 19 February 1984 in Sarajevo, SFR Yugoslavia. Starting from 1984, Jahorina ski resort bears the official name "Olympic Center Jahorina".

Since the 2010s, the Jahorina ski resort has gone thorough several investment cycles with aim to renew its aging infrastructure. The ski lift system was upgraded from 2012 to 2018 with new Leitner chairlifts.

During 2017, the brand new snowmaking infrastructure was deployed in ski resort, along with a huge artificial lake built on top of Jahorina mountain. In December 2018, the Jahorina ski resort has officially put the new snowmaking system in use, covering all ski slopes with artificial snow.

As of 2018, the Jahorina ski resort is the largest and most popular ski resort in Bosnia and Herzegovina. Apart from alpine skiing, snowboarding, hiking and sledding, it offers a variety of outdoor sports and activities. The Nordic skiing tracks, cross-country trails and various other sport facilities offer additional options for athletes and tourists. The floodlighting system enables night skiing on Poljice ski piste.

In 2018, the ski resort recorded 185,000 visitors, the highest count since the 1980s.

The Jahorina ski resort was among the venues where the 2019 European Youth Olympic Winter Festival took place during February 2019.

== Climate and geography ==
The ski resort is located at elevations between 1,300 and 1,916 meters, with over 25 km (16 mi) of ski slopes and modern facilities. Day count under the snow in Jahorina ski resort is on average 175 days annually, spanning from October to May. The average natural snow height on ski pistes in February is 106 cm (42 in). High levels of natural snowfall are complemented by snowmaking equipment.

== Transportation ==
The Sarajevo International Airport is located 30 km (19 mi) away from the ski resort, making Jahorina one of the most reachable ski resorts in Europe via plane. The ski resort is located 15 km (9.3 mi) from the municipality of Pale and 25 km (16 mi) from the capital city of Sarajevo, making it well-connected with all main transport routes in Bosnia and Herzegovina. The ski resort is reached by a maximum of a six hour drive from all major cities in the region: Belgrade, Zagreb, Novi Sad, Split, Podgorica and Ljubljana.

== Gallery ==
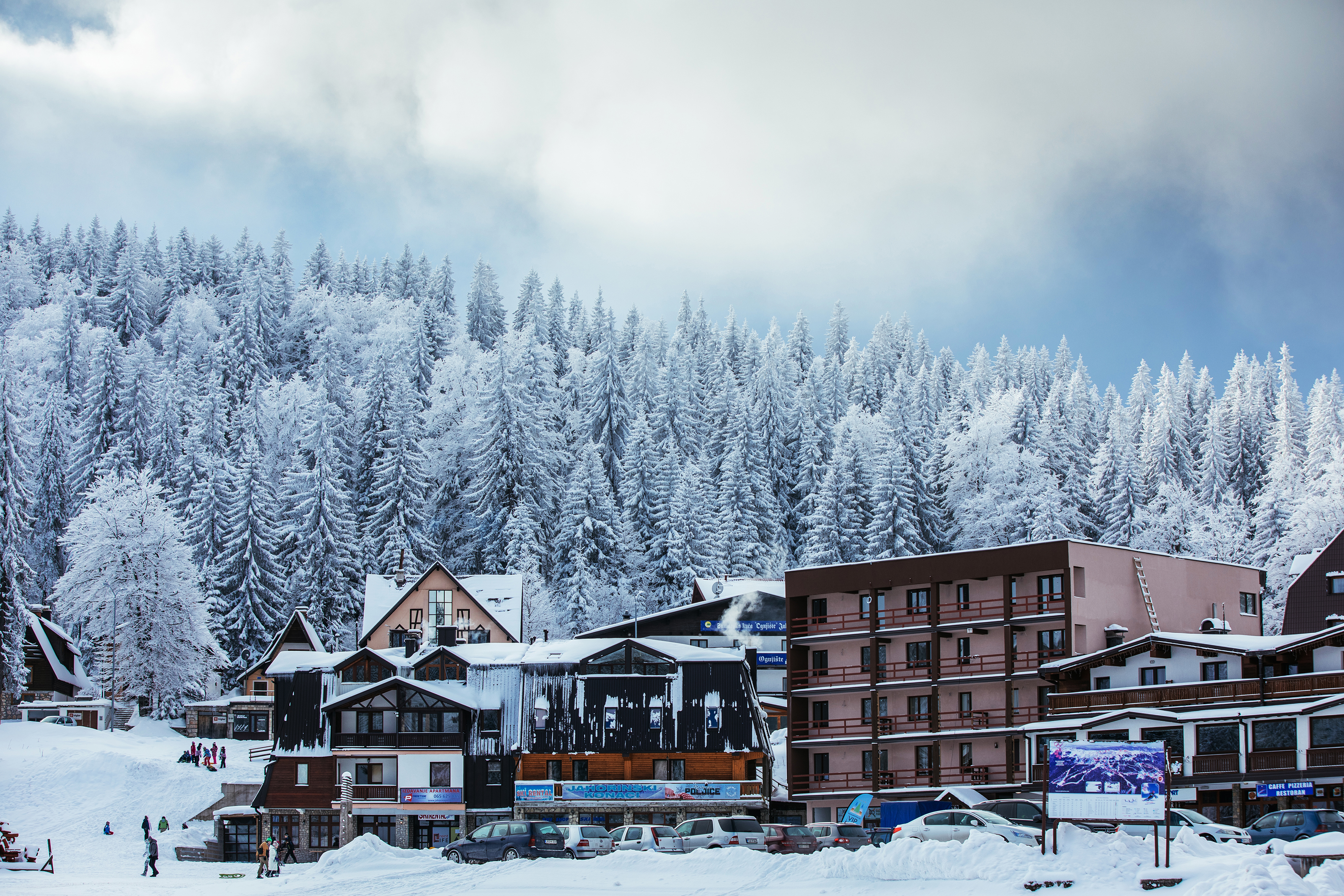
Jahorina Ski Resort base

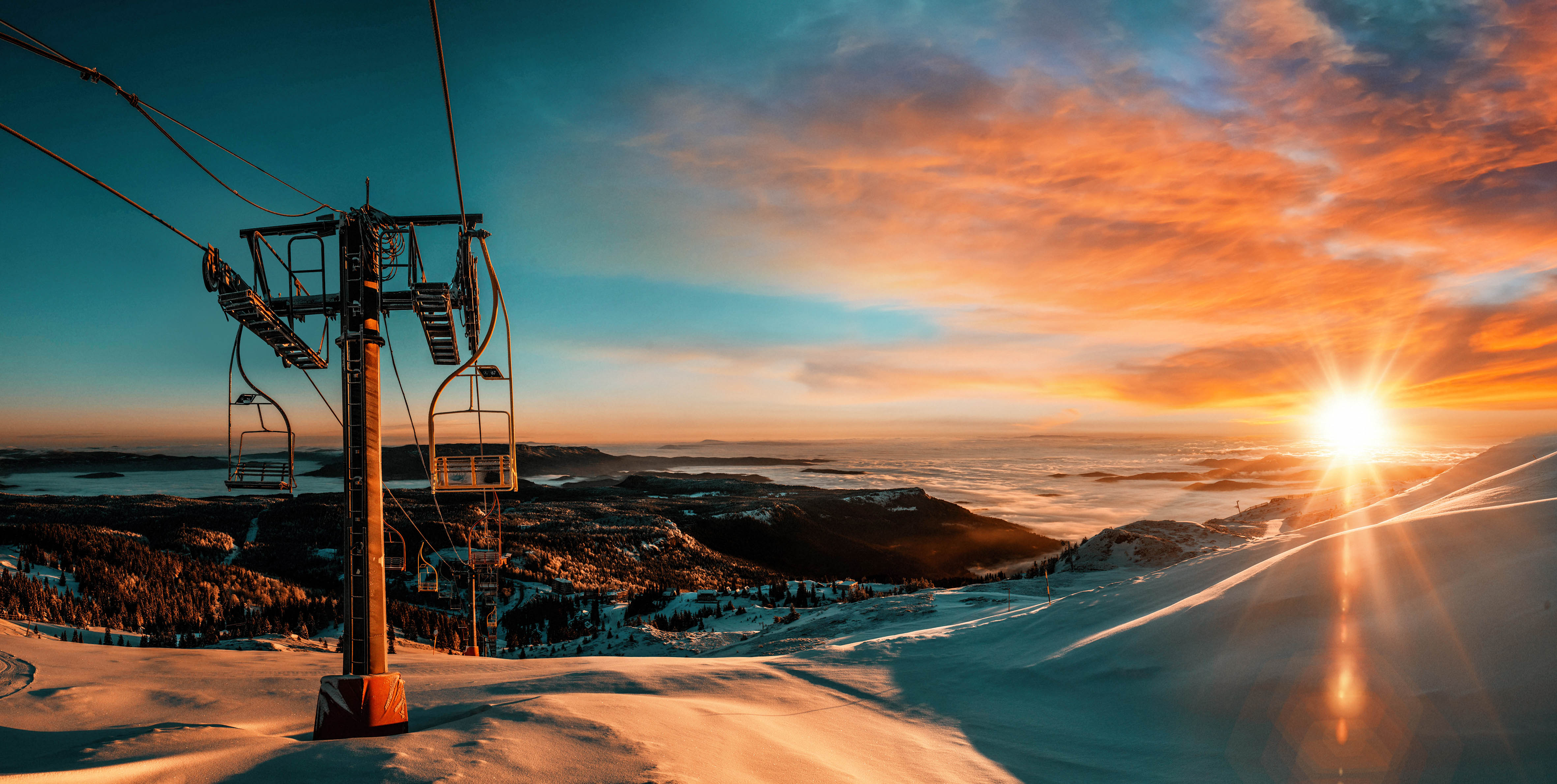
Jahorina Ski Resort chairlifts

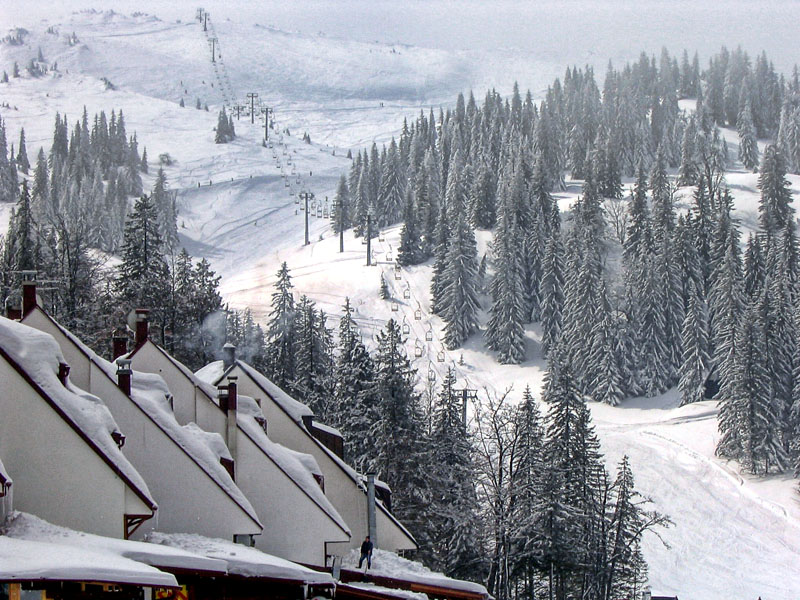
View from the base of Jahorina ski resort

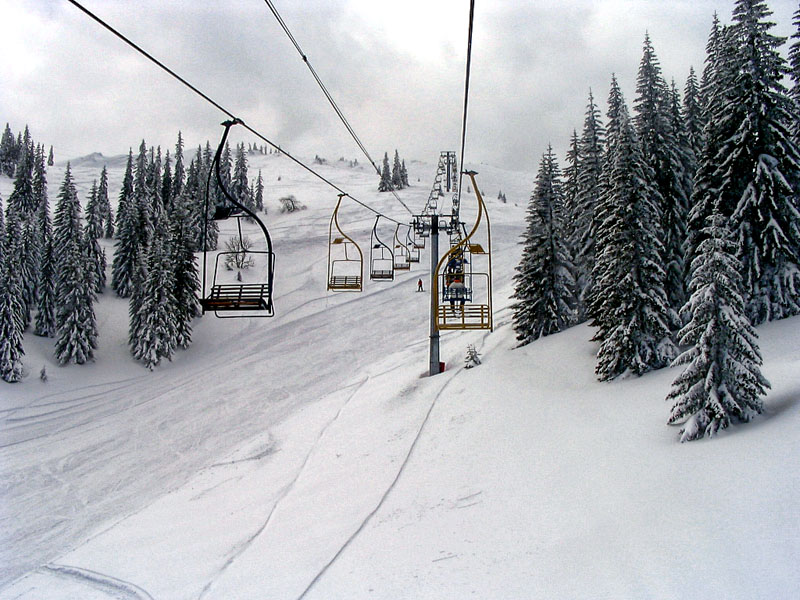
Jahorina ski lifts

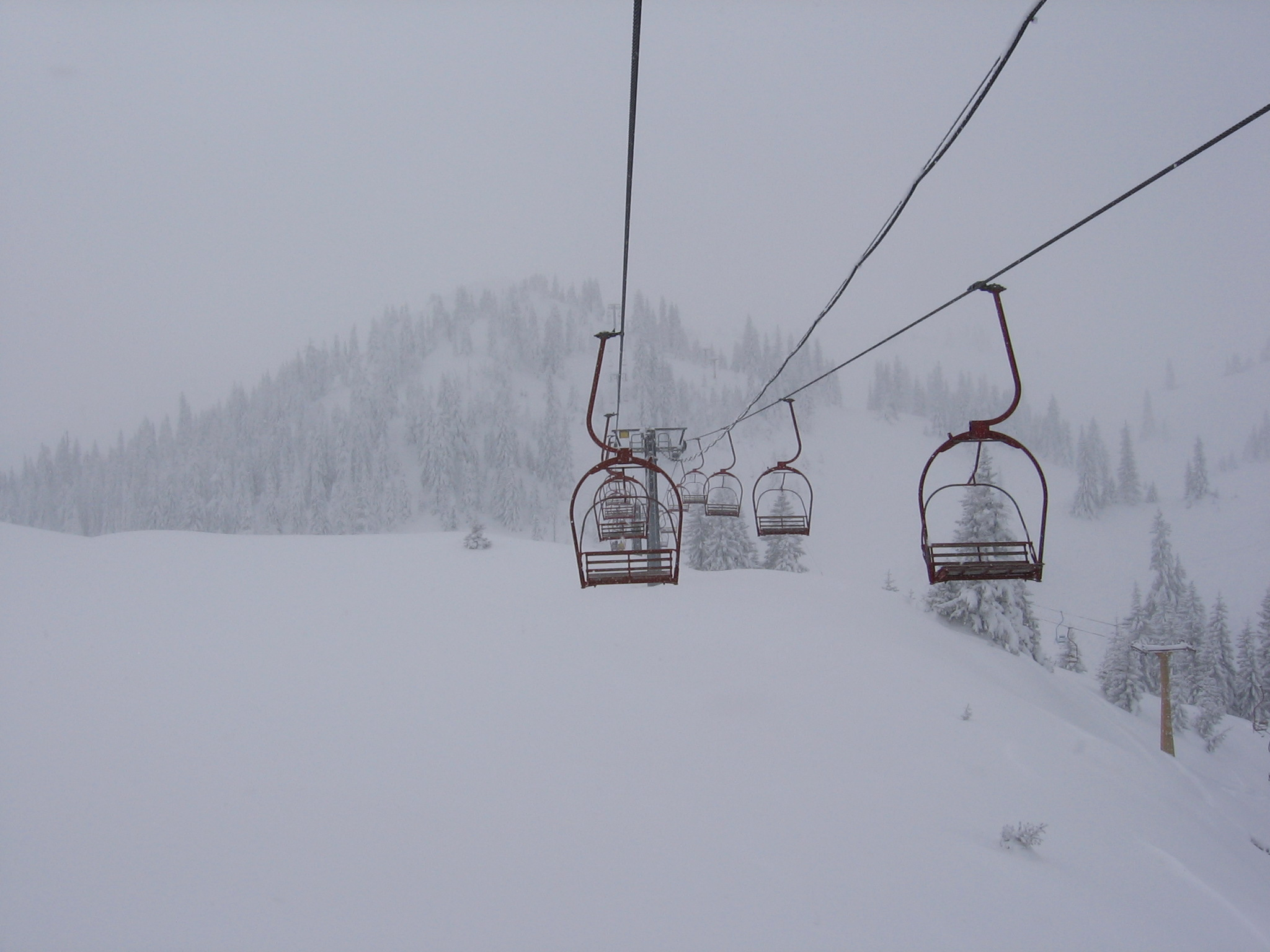
Jahorina chairlift

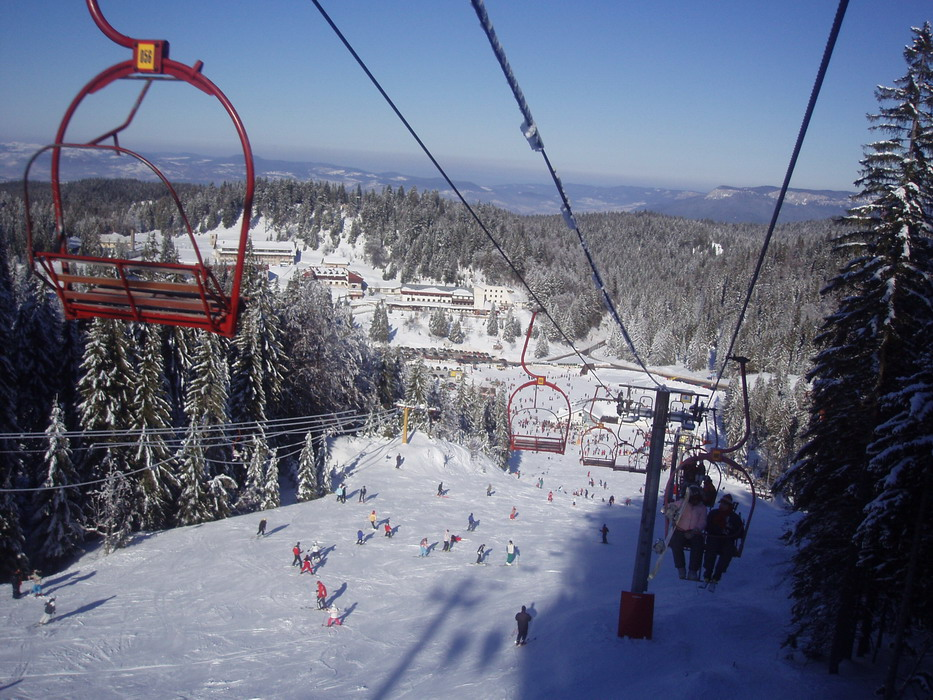
Jahorina chairlift looking on ski resort center

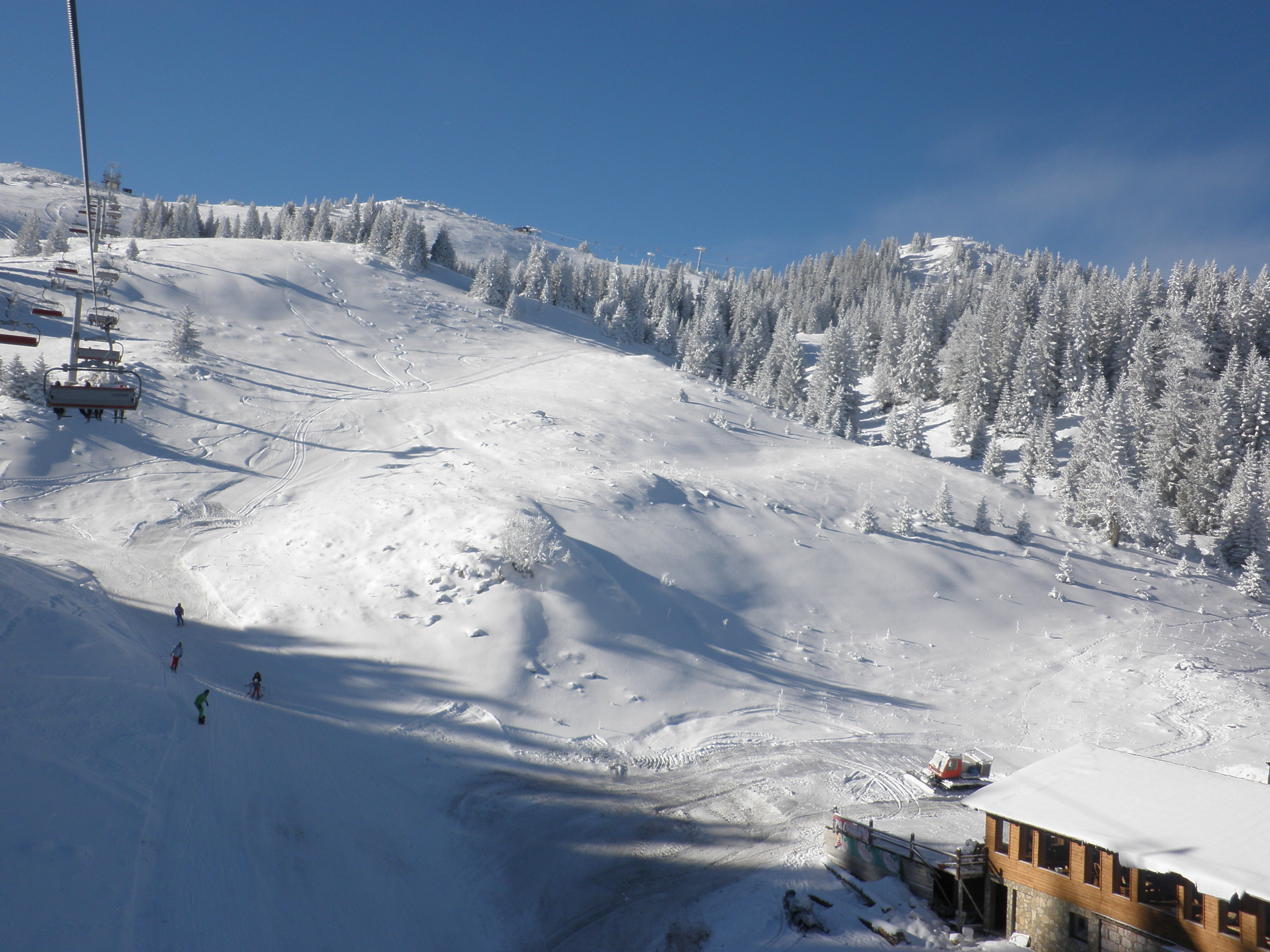
View from chairlift

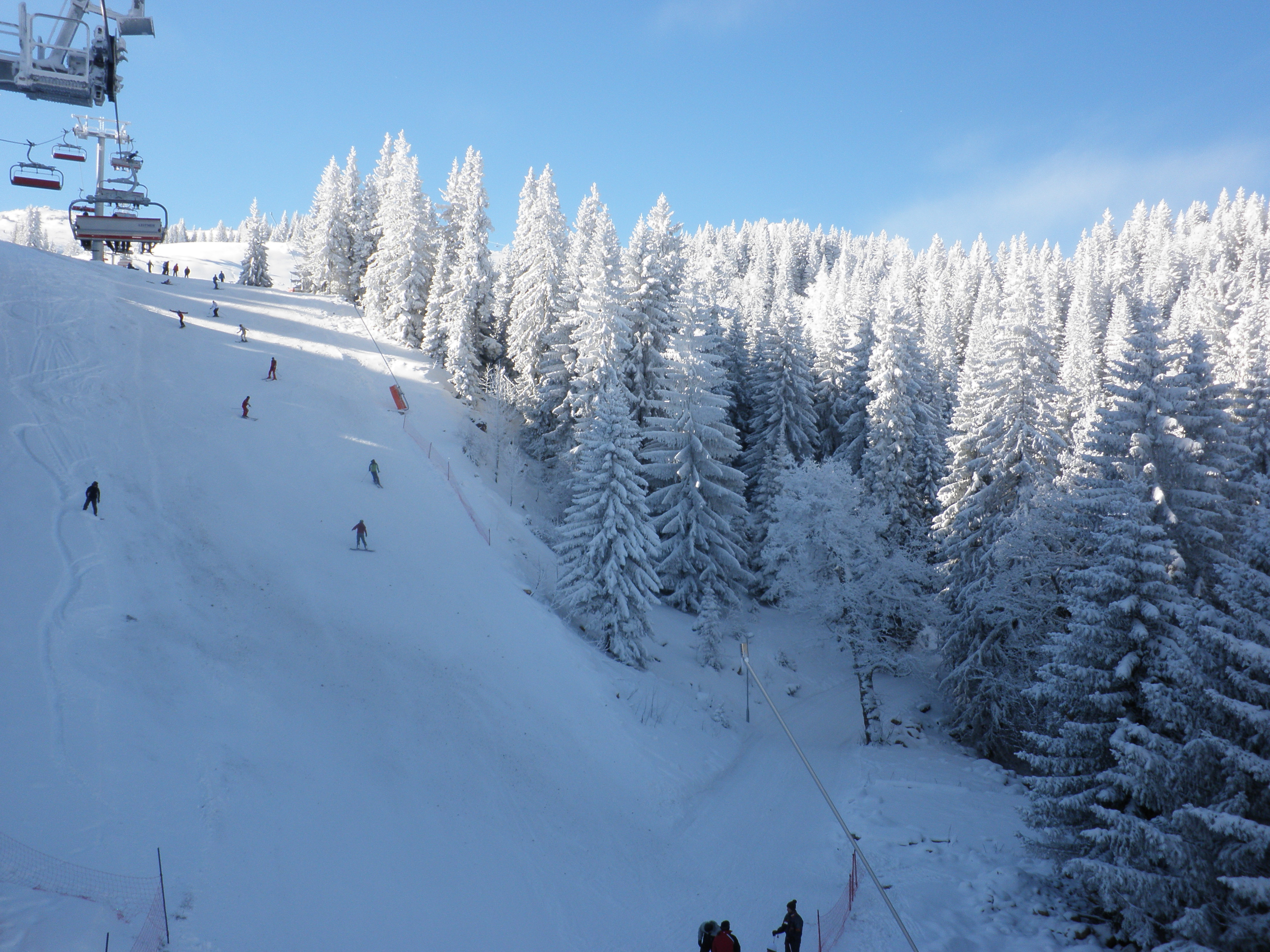
View on ski slope from chairlift

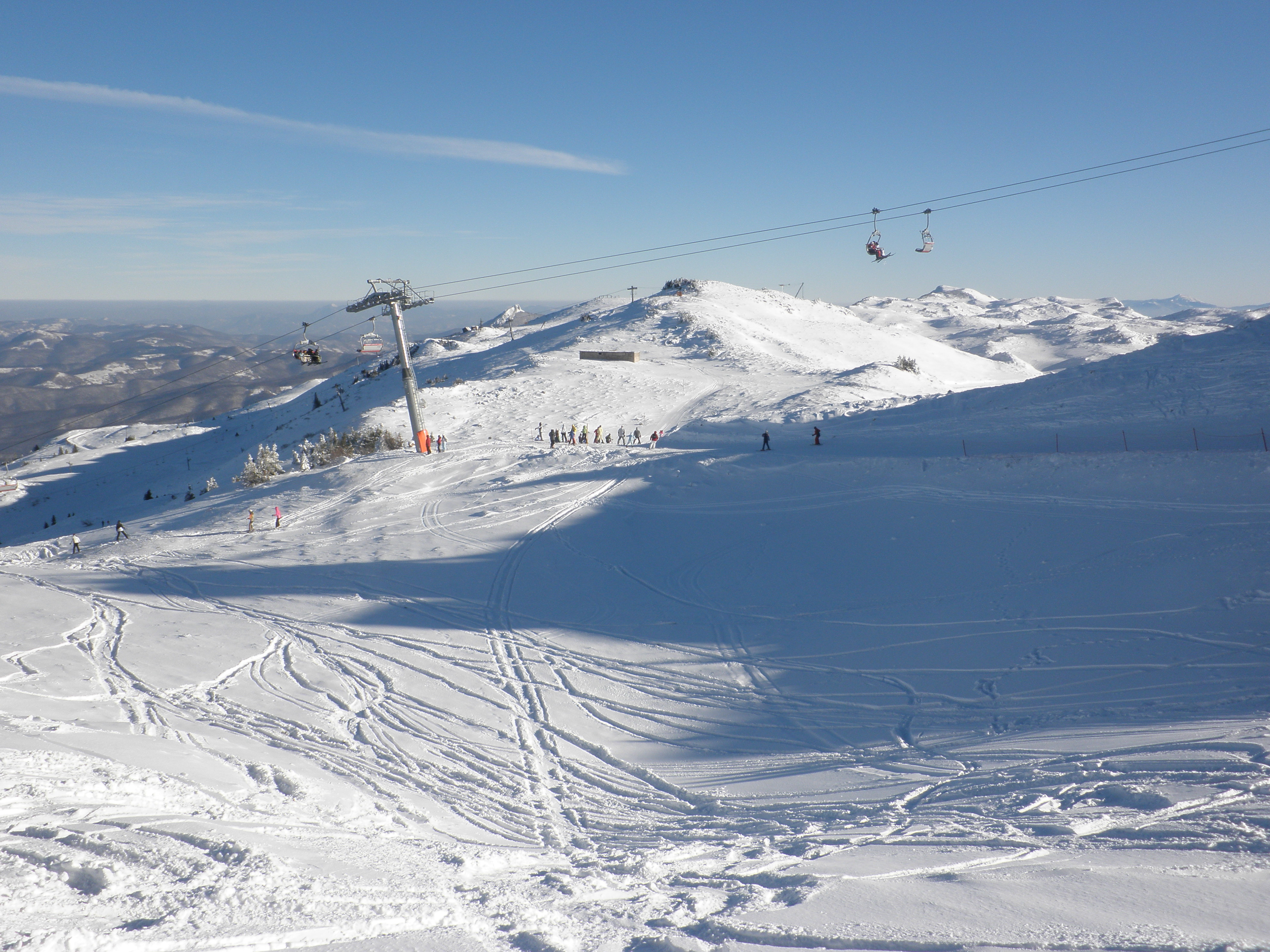
Jahorina ski resort

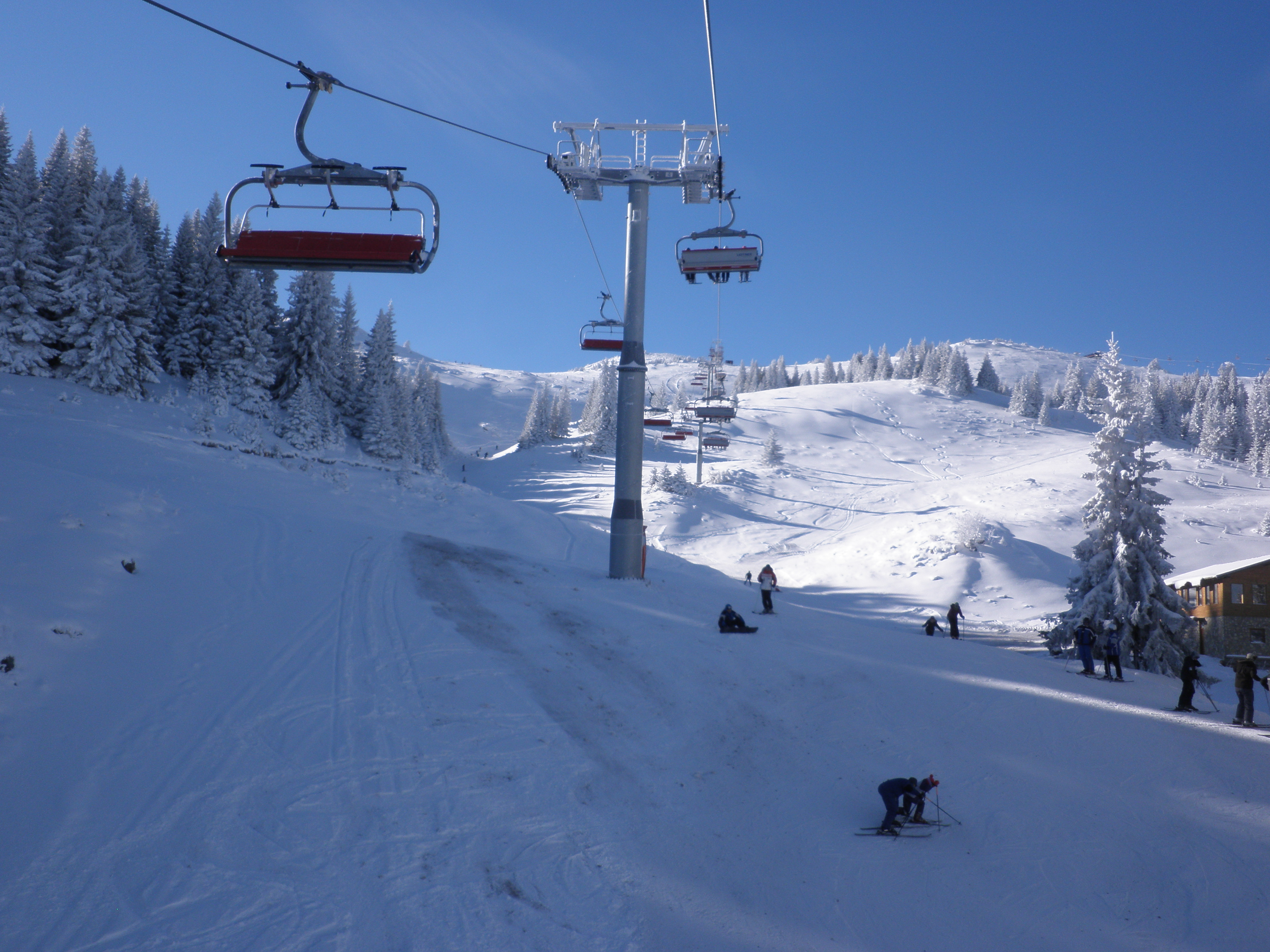
Jahorina ski resort

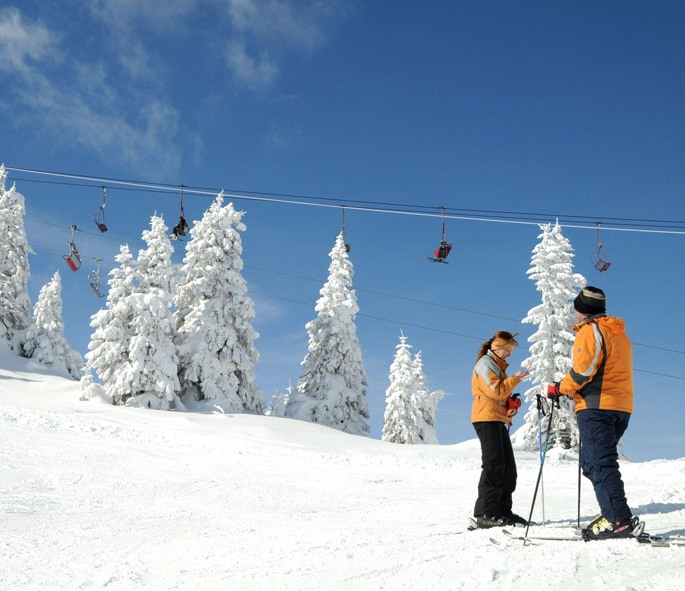
Jahorina ski resort

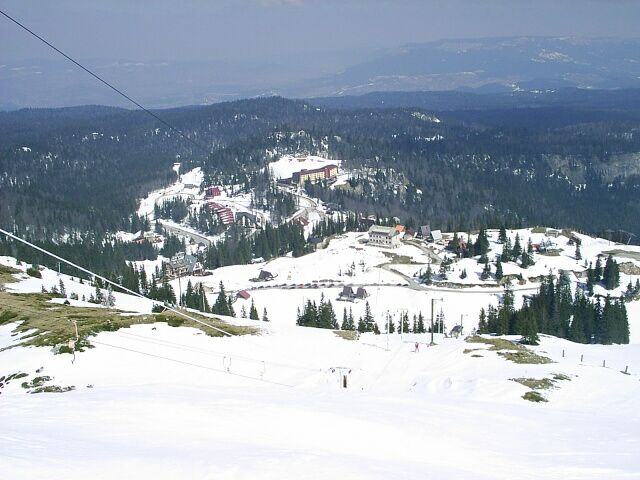
View of ski resort base from ski slope

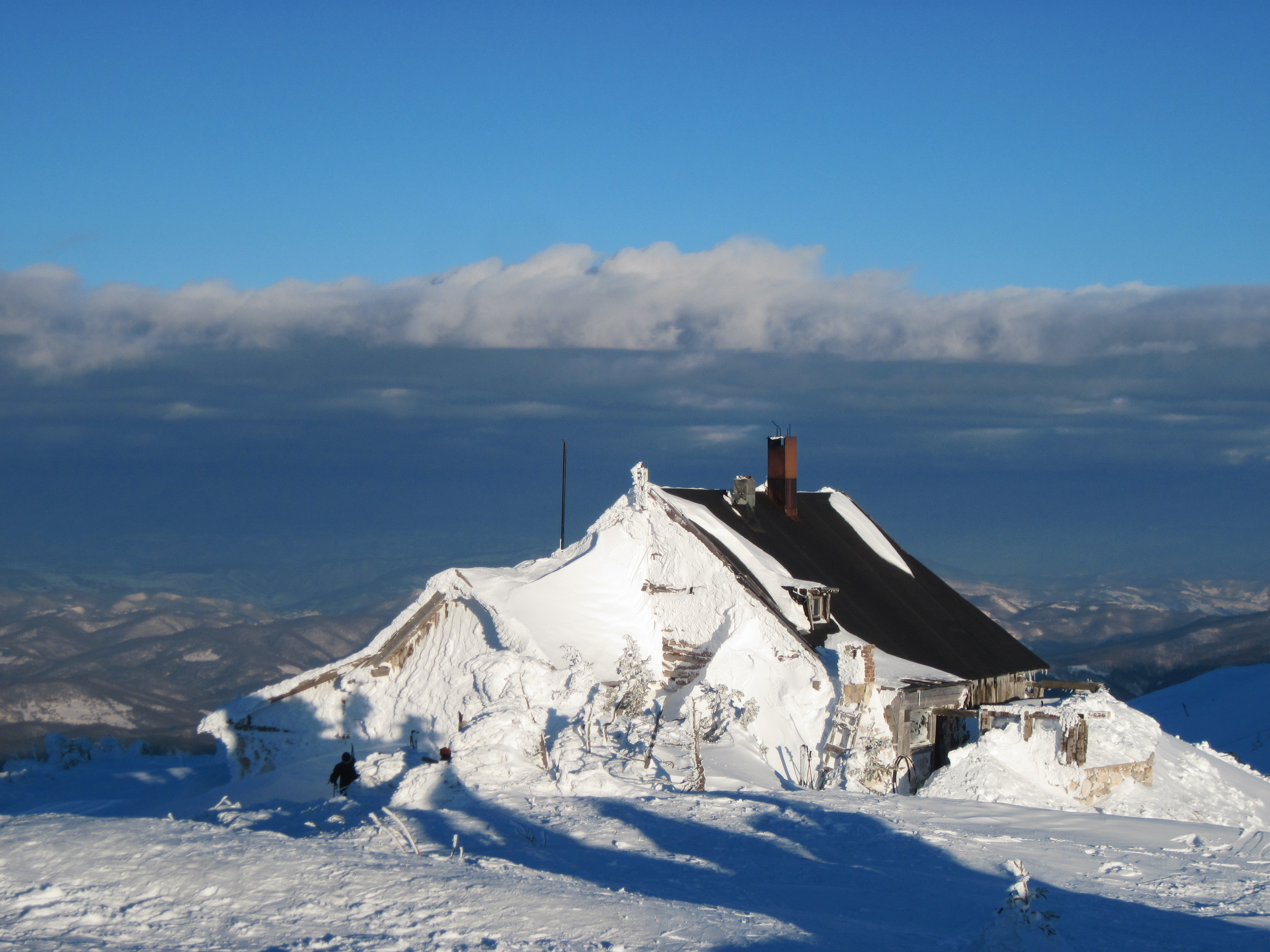
Winter house in Jahorina after avalanche

== See also ==
- Tourism in Bosnia and Herzegovina
