= Crnići-Greda =

- Village
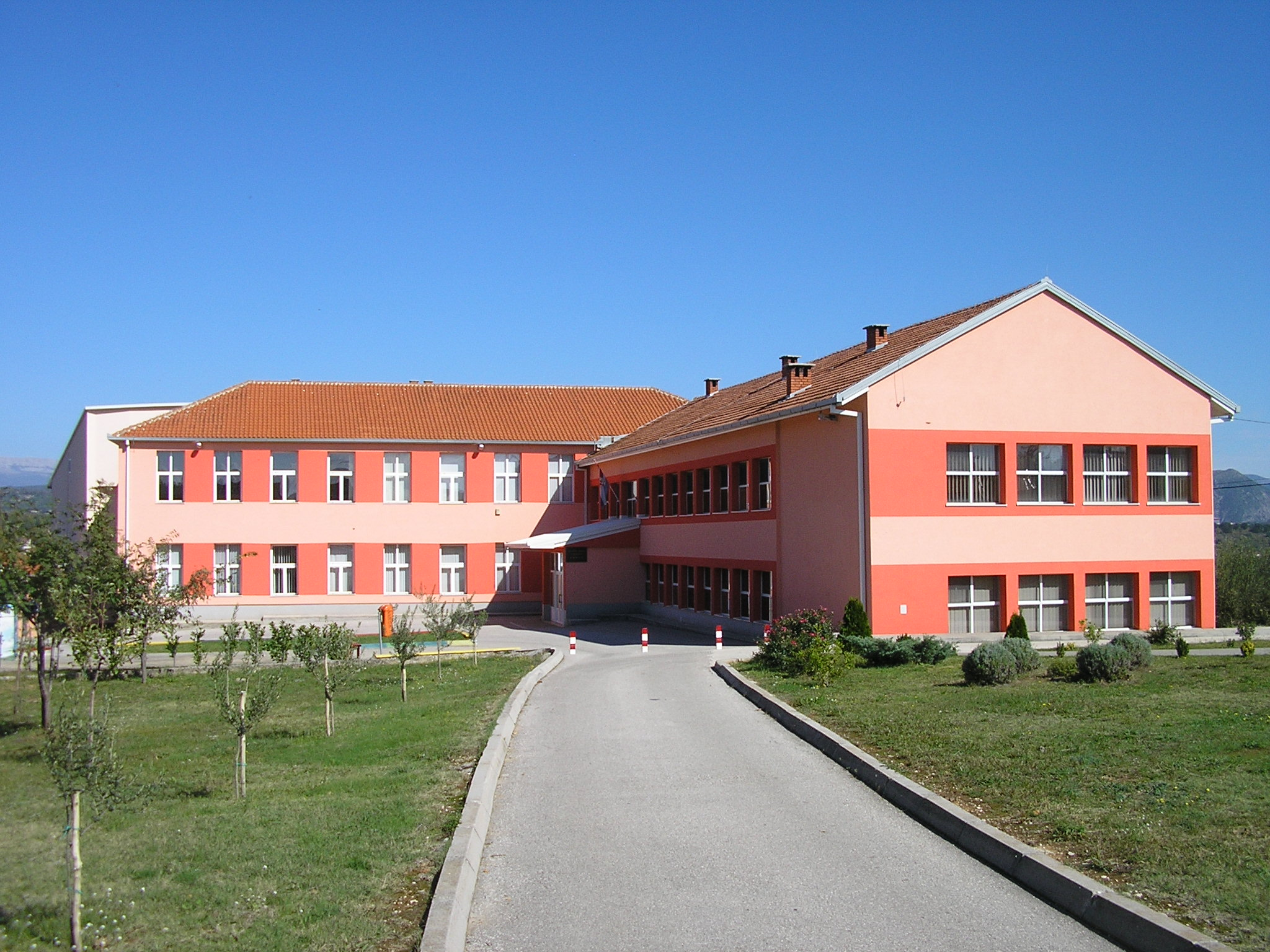
- Elementary school

- Location within Bosnia and Herzegovina
- Coordinates: 43.1327°N 17.8695°E
- Country: Bosnia and Herzegovina
- Entity: Federation of Bosnia and Herzegovina
- Canton: Herzegovina-Neretva
- Municipality: Stolac

Area
  - Total: 2.39 sq mi (6.18 km^{2})

Population (2013)
  - Total: 1,501
  - Density: 629/sq mi (243/km^{2})
- Time zone: UTC+1 (CET)
  - Summer (DST): UTC+2 (CEST)

Crnići-Greda is a village in the municipality of Stolac, Bosnia and Herzegovina.

== Demographics ==
According to the 2013 census, its population was 1,501.

Ethnicity in 2013
| Ethnicity | Number | Percentage |
|---|---|---|
| Croats | 1,370 | 91.3% |
| Bosniaks | 124 | 8.3% |
| Serbs | 2 | 0.1% |
| other/undeclared | 5 | 0.3% |
| Total | 1,501 | 100% |
