= Gunjani =

- Village
- Location within Bosnia and Herzegovina
- Coordinates: 43.8286961°N 18.0648443°E
- Country: Bosnia and Herzegovina
- Entity: Federation of Bosnia and Herzegovina
- Canton: Central Bosnia
- Municipality: Kreševo

Area
  - Total: 1.98 sq mi (5.14 km^{2})

Population (2013)
  - Total: 35
  - Density: 18/sq mi (6.8/km^{2})
- Time zone: UTC+1 (CET)
  - Summer (DST): UTC+2 (CEST)

Gunjani is a village in the municipality of Kreševo, Bosnia and Herzegovina.

== Demographics ==
According to the 2013 census, its population was 35.

Ethnicity in 2013
Ethnicity	Number	Percentage
Bosniaks	34	97.1%
other/undeclared	1	2.9%
Total	35	100%
