= Crnički Kamenik =

- Village
- Location within Bosnia and Herzegovina
- Coordinates: 43.8884°N 17.9750°E
- Country: Bosnia and Herzegovina
- Entity: Federation of Bosnia and Herzegovina
- Canton: Central Bosnia
- Municipality: Kreševo

Area
  - Total: 1.31 sq mi (3.38 km^{2})

Population (2013)
  - Total: 102
  - Density: 78.2/sq mi (30.2/km^{2})
- Time zone: UTC+1 (CET)
  - Summer (DST): UTC+2 (CEST)

Crnički Kamenik is a village in the municipality of Kreševo, Bosnia and Herzegovina.

== Demographics ==
According to the 2013 census, its population was 102.

Ethnicity in 2013
Ethnicity	Number	Percentage
Bosniaks	86	84.3%
Croats	16	15.7%
Total	102	100%
