= Buturović Polje =

Buturović Polje Бутуровић Поље
- Village
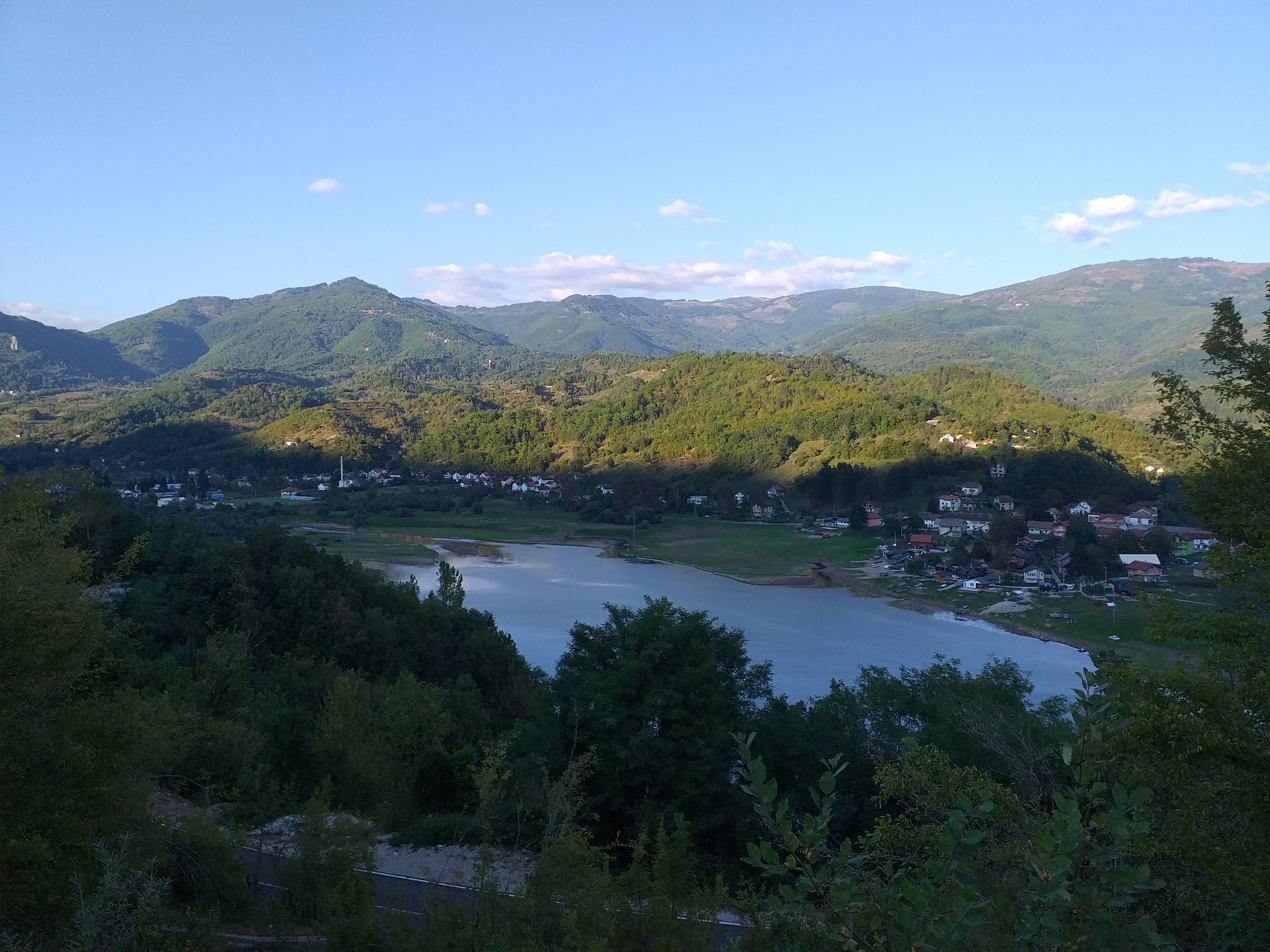

- Location within Bosnia and Herzegovina
- Coordinates: 43°43′35″N 17°49′24″E
- Country: Bosnia and Herzegovina
- Entity: Federation of Bosnia and Herzegovina
- Canton: Herzegovina-Neretva
- Municipality: Konjic

Area
  - Total: 0.58 sq mi (1.49 km^{2})

Population (2013)
  - Total: 348
  - Density: 605/sq mi (234/km^{2})
- Time zone: UTC+1 (CET)
  - Summer (DST): UTC+2 (CEST)

Buturović Polje (Cyrillic: Бутуровић Поље) is a village in the municipality of Konjic, Bosnia and Herzegovina.

== Demographics ==
According to the 2013 census, its population was 348.

Ethnicity in 2013
Ethnicity	Number	Percentage
Bosniaks	343	98.6%
Croats	1	0.3%
other/undeclared	4	1.1%
Total	348	100%

== Sport ==
Buturović Polje has a football club called FK Klis Buturović Polje .
