= Kravica massacre (1995) =

Massacre of Bosniaks in the Bosnian War

Kravica attack
- Part of the Srebrenica massacre in the Bosnian War
- Kravica (Bosnia and Herzegovina)
- Location: 44°13′N 19°12′E; Kravica, Bosnia and Herzegovina
- Date: 14 July 1995
- Target: Bosniaks
- Attack type: executions
- Deaths: Between 1,000 and 1,500 deaths
- Victim: Bosniak men
- Perpetrator: Bosnian Serb military units

The Kravica massacre was one of the mass executions of Bosniaks by the Army of Republika Srpska during the Srebrenica massacre. It was committed on 14 July 1995. It is estimated that between 1,000 and 1,500 men were killed.

== Background ==
The predominantly Bosniak area of Central Podrinje (the region around Srebrenica) had a primary strategic importance to Serbs, as without it there would be no territorial integrity within their new political entity of Republika Srpska. They thus proceeded with the ethnic cleansing of Bosniaks from the territories in Eastern Bosnia and Central Podrinje in April 1992. In neighbouring Bratunac, Bosniaks were either killed or forced to flee to Srebrenica, resulting in 1,156 deaths, according to Bosnian government data. Thousands of Bosniaks were also killed in Foča, Zvornik, Cerska and Snagovo. Serb military and paramilitary forces from the area and neighboring parts of eastern Bosnia and Serbia gained control of Srebrenica for several weeks in early 1992, killing and expelling Bosniak civilians. In May 1992, Bosnian government forces under the leadership of Naser Orić recaptured the town. The Serb authorities remained intent on capturing the enclave. On April 13, 1993, the Serbs told the UNHCR representatives that they would attack the town within two days unless the Bosniaks surrendered and agreed to be evacuated. The Bosniaks refused to surrender. On April 16, 1993, the United Nations Security Council passed Resolution 819, which demanded that: all parties and others concerned treat Srebrenica and its surroundings as a safe area which should be free from any armed attack or any other hostile act.

=== Serb take-over of Srebrenica ===
The Serb offensive on Srebrenica began in earnest on July 6, 1995. In the following days, the five UNPROFOR observation posts, in the southern part of the enclave, fell one by one in the face of the Serb forces advance. Some of the Dutch soldiers retreated into the enclave after their posts were attacked, but the crews of the other observation posts surrendered into Serb custody. Simultaneously, the defending Bosnian forces came under heavy fire and were pushed back towards the town. Once the southern perimeter began to collapse, about 4,000 Bosniak residents, who had been living in a Swedish housing complex for refugees nearby, fled north into Srebrenica town. Dutchbat soldiers reported that the advancing Serbs were cleansing the houses in the southern part of the enclave.

Late on 9 July 1995, emboldened by early successes and little resistance from largely demilitarized Bosniaks, as well as the absence of any significant reaction from the international community, President Karadžić issued a new order authorising the VRS Drina Corps to capture the town of Srebrenica.

On the morning of July 10, 1995, the situation in Srebrenica was tense. Residents crowded the streets. The Dutch UNPROFOR troops fired warning shots over the attacking Serbs’ heads and their mortars fired flares but they never fired directly on any Serb units. Lieutenant-Colonel Karremans sent many urgent requests for NATO air support to defend the town, but no assistance was forthcoming until around 2:30PM on July 11, 1995, when 2 Dutch F-16's guided by British SAS bombed VRS tanks advancing towards the town. NATO planes also attempted to bomb VRS artillery positions overlooking the town, but had to abort the operation due to poor visibility. NATO plans to continue the air strikes were abandoned following the Serb Army's threats to kill Dutch troops and French hostage Pilots being held in the custody of the VRS as well as shell the UN Potočari compound on the outside of the town, and surrounding areas where 20,000 to 30,000 civilians had fled.

Late in the afternoon of July 11, General Mladić, accompanied by General Živanović (then Commander of the Drina Corps), General Krstić (then Deputy Commander and Chief of Staff of the Drina Corps) and other Serb Army officers, took a triumphant walk through the empty streets of Srebrenica town. The moment was captured on film by Serbian journalist, Zoran Petrović.

=== Plan to execute all Bosniak men ===
A concerted effort was made to capture and kill all Bosniak men of military age. In fact, those killed included many boys well below that age and elderly men several years above that age that remained in the enclave following the take-over of Srebrenica. These men and boys were targeted regardless of whether they chose to flee to UN base in Potočari or to join the column which was trying to escape from the Serbs. The operation to capture and detain the Bosnian Muslim men was well organised and comprehensive. The buses which transported the women and children were systematically searched for men. Captured men were sent to different locations to be executed by different units that participated in genocide.

== Executions in Kravica ==
The executions were conducted in the largest of four warehouses (farm sheds) owned by the Agricultural Cooperative in Kravica. Between 1,000 and 1,500 men had been captured in fields near Sandići and detained in Sandići Meadow. They were brought to Kravica, either by bus or on foot, the distance being approximately one kilometer. A witness recalls seeing around 200 men, stripped to the waist and with their hands in the air, being forced to run in the direction of Kravica. An aerial photograph taken at 14.00 hours that afternoon showed two buses standing in front of the sheds.

At around 18.00 hours, when the men were all being held in the warehouse, Serb soldiers threw in hand grenades and opened fire with various weapons, including rocket propelled grenades. In the local area it is said that the mass murder in Kravica was unplanned and started quite spontaneously when one of the warehouse doors suddenly swung open.

Supposedly, there was more killing in and around Kravica and Sandići. Even before the murders in the warehouse, some 200 or 300 men were formed up in ranks near Sandići and then mown down with machine guns. At Kravica, it seems that the local population had a hand in the killings. Some victims were mutilated and killed with knives. The bodies were taken to Bratunac or simply dumped in the river that runs alongside the road. One witness states that this all took place on 14 July. There were three survivors of the mass murder in the farm sheds at Kravica.

Armed guards shot at the men who tried to climb out the windows to escape the massacre. When the shooting stopped, the shed was full of bodies. Another survivor, who was only slightly wounded, reports:

I was not even able to touch the floor, the concrete floor of the warehouse… After the shooting, I felt a strange kind of heat, warmth, which was actually coming from the blood that covered the concrete floor, and I was stepping on the dead people who were lying around. But there were even people who were still alive, who were only wounded, and as soon as I would step on him, I would hear him cry, moan, because I was trying to move as fast as I could. I could tell that people had been completely disembodied, and I could feel bones of the people that had been hit by those bursts of gunfire or shells, I could feel their ribs crushing. And then I would get up again and continue . . . .

When this witness climbed out of a window, he was seen by a guard who shot at him. He then pretended to be dead and managed to escape the following morning. The other witness quoted above spent the night under a heap of bodies; the next morning, he watched as the soldiers examined the corpses for signs of life. The few survivors were forced to sing Serbian songs, and were then shot. Once the final victim had been killed, an excavator was driven in to shunt the bodies out of the shed; the asphalt outside was then hosed down with water. In September 1996, however, it was still possible to find the evidence.

Analysis of hair, blood and explosives residue, collected at the Kravica Warehouse, provide strong evidence of the killings. Experts determined the presence of bullet strikes, explosives residue, bullets and shell cases, as well as human blood, bones and tissue adhering to the walls and floors of the building. Forensic evidence presented by the ICTY prosecutor link between the executions in Kravica and the primary mass grave known as "Glogova 2", in which the remains of 139 people were found. No blindfolds or restraints were found. In the secondary grave known as "Zeleni Jadar 5", there were 145 bodies, a number of which were charred. Pieces of brick and window frame which were found in the "Glogova 1" grave that was opened later also established a link with Kravica. Here, the remains of 191 victims were found.

Precisely which Bosnian Serb units were involved in the Kravica executions cannot be stated with any certainty. There were certainly personnel of the Drina Corps in the area at the time, and the headquarters of one of the Bratunac Brigade battalions was only 400 metres from Glogova. However, there are also indications that a detachment of Military Police could have been involved in burying the victims. One Bosnian Serb witness observed soon after the executions that both VRS and Special Police could well have been involved. Given the proximity of the headquarters, the request for the earthmover, and the fact that military transport was making regular use of the road through Kravica, it is almost inconceivable that the Drina Corps could have been unaware of what was going on in the area.

== See also ==
- Bosnian genocide
