= Kreševo =

- Town and municipality
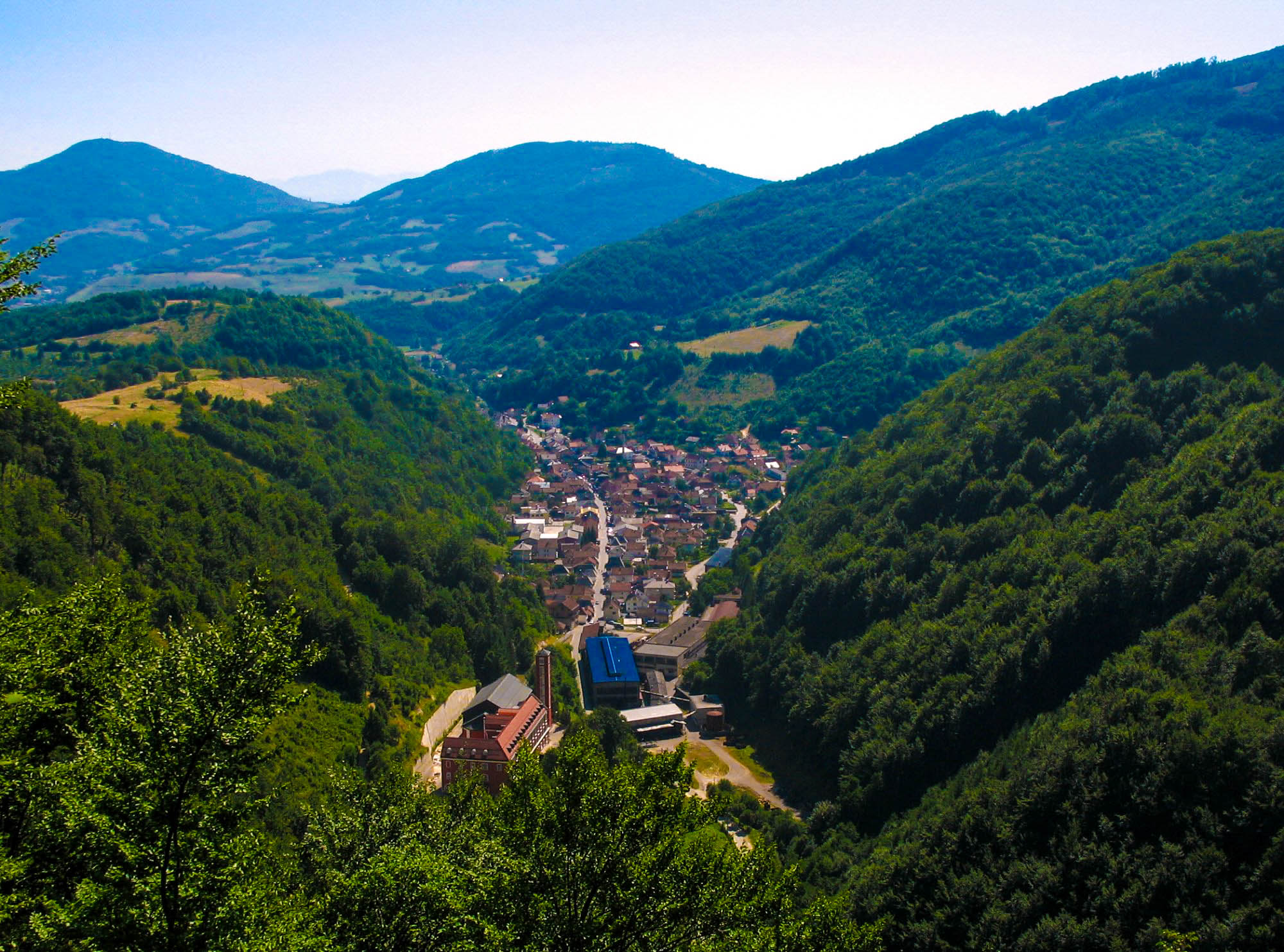
- Town of Kreševo panorama

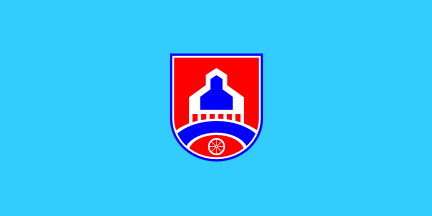
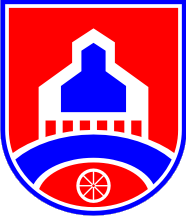
- Flag Seal

- Location of the municipality in Bosnia and Herzegovina

- Location within Bosnia and Herzegovina
- Coordinates: 43°51′56.22″N 18°02′04.52″E
- Country: Bosnia and Herzegovina
- Entity: Federation of Bosnia and Herzegovina
- Canton: Central Bosnia

Government
  - Municipal mayor: Boris Marić (HDZ BiH)

Area
  - Town and municipality: 149 km^{2} (58 sq mi)
  - Land: 149 km^{2} (58 sq mi)
  - Water: 0 km^{2} (0 sq mi)
- Elevation: 640 m (2,100 ft)

Population (2013)
  - Town and municipality: 5,273
  - Density: 35.4/km^{2} (91.7/sq mi)
  - Urban: 1,025
- Time zone: UTC+1 (CET)
  - Summer (DST): UTC+2 (CEST)
- Post code: 71260
- Area code: +387 030
- Website: www.kresevo.ba

Kreševo (pronounced [krêʃeʋo]) is a town and municipality located in Central Bosnia Canton of the Federation of Bosnia and Herzegovina, an entity of Bosnia and Herzegovina. Kreševo is a mountainous town, located in a narrow valley of the Kreševka river, under the slopes of Mount Bitovnje. An old Franciscan monastery of St. Catharine is located in the town's outskirts.

== History ==
=== Antique period ===
The area of Kreševo was inhabited since the Neolithic period. Various material remains are indicating that a life in Kreševo was intensified during the Roman Empire, when the municipality was part of the Roman province of Illyrcicum, as well as during the Migration Period. Reason for this are the subsoil assets of the Kreševo Municipality area, where gold, silver, copper, iron and mercury where exploited.

A number of the Roman aqueducts can be found on the area of the Kreševo Municipality, as well as remains of the Roman settlement near the village of Zid. During the destruction of the old Kreševan church in 1964, a number of the romanesque capitals were found in its walls from the period of 11th and 12th century. A Roman epigraphic monument was also found, in which an anonymous Roman municipium is mentioned. During the Roman period, there were two connection roads to the Via Argentaria, one of them led to an area near Sarajevo, and the other led towards the Visoko area.

=== Medieval period ===
The largest development of the Kreševo area occurred during the period of the Bosnian Kingdom. The first written mention of Kreševan silver, copper and lead mines dates to 1381. When the Saxons arrived in Bosnia, the technology of extracting and ore processing was significantly developed. They brought legal norms called the "Saxons' laws" and modern technology. However, the biggest rise of the Kreševo area occurred when it became one of the seats of the Bosnian kings. The first mentioning of the town of Kreševo was in a charter of King Stephen Thomas from 12 August 1434. The King mentioned Kreševo as a "royal town of Kreševo". During that time, the Kingdom of Bosnia had an intensive cooperation with the Republic of Ragusa. On 3 September 1444, King Stephen Thomas approved trade privileges to the Ragusans in Kreševo.

The remains of the royal town are preserved until today. The royal town is surrounded by ramparts, (Serbo-Croatian: bedem) so the area was named Bedem after them. In honor of Queen Catherine of Bosnia, a chapel was built in the Bedem in 1996. The royal town had suburbs in which craft, commerce and mining boroughs developed. The ramparts remained functional after the Ottoman conquest, as they were mentioned in 1469 as a Turkish fortress. Ragusans, who had their colony in Kreševo, held there a customs office and led the entire mining trade.

Along with Kreševo, Deževice had also great significance in this period. Today, Deževice are one of the Kreševan villages. Deževice were mentioned for the first time in 1403 as one of the seats of the Bosnian king. During the medieval period, Deževice had important lead, silver and iron mines, as well as a market town and a Ragusan colony. Customs in Deževice were mentioned for the first time in 1408. Knyaz of the market town named Pavle, was mentioned for the first time in 1412, and other knyazes were mentioned later, among them Knyaz Milutin Drašković in 1422 and Knyaz Milivoj in 1425. Deževice was a seat of a Franciscan Order who had a monastery there.

=== Ottoman Empire ===
The Ottomans conquered Kreševo in 1463, but Ragusans remained tenants of the customs office for some time. During the Ottoman Empire, Kreševo was a centre of a nahiyah, that was mentioned for the first time in 1469. At first, the Kreševo Nahiyah was a part of the kadiluk of Bobovac. In that year, the Kreševan fortress, bazaar and silver mines were mentioned, along with assisting miners in Deževice and Dusina. Kreševo fortress was mentioned for another time in 1509, but by that time, it was already abandoned, perhaps even in 1489, when Dubrovnik was fortified. For some time, the Kreševo Nahiya belonged to the kadiluk of Sarajevo.

In 1468, Kreševo was the second largest city in Bosnia, after Fojnica. In that year, there were 299 taxpayer households, and in 1485, there was 290 Christian and 9 Muslim households. This was the first appearance of Muslims in Kreševo. In 1489, there were 275 Christian households and 11 Muslims individuals. In Deževice in 1468 there was 48 Christian households and 12 individuals, and in 1485 there was 49 Christian households and 11 individuals and one Muslim household.

The Kreševo Nahiyah was also mentioned in 1485 and 1489, but it was left out in censuses from 1516 and 1530. Those censuses do not mention Fojnica and Lepenica as well, as all of them, like Kreševo, were integrated to the Visoko Nahiyah. In 18th century, Kreševo become a part of the Sarajevo Kadiluk, and in 19th century it was a part of the Fojnica Mudiriyah in Sarajevan Kaymakamluk.

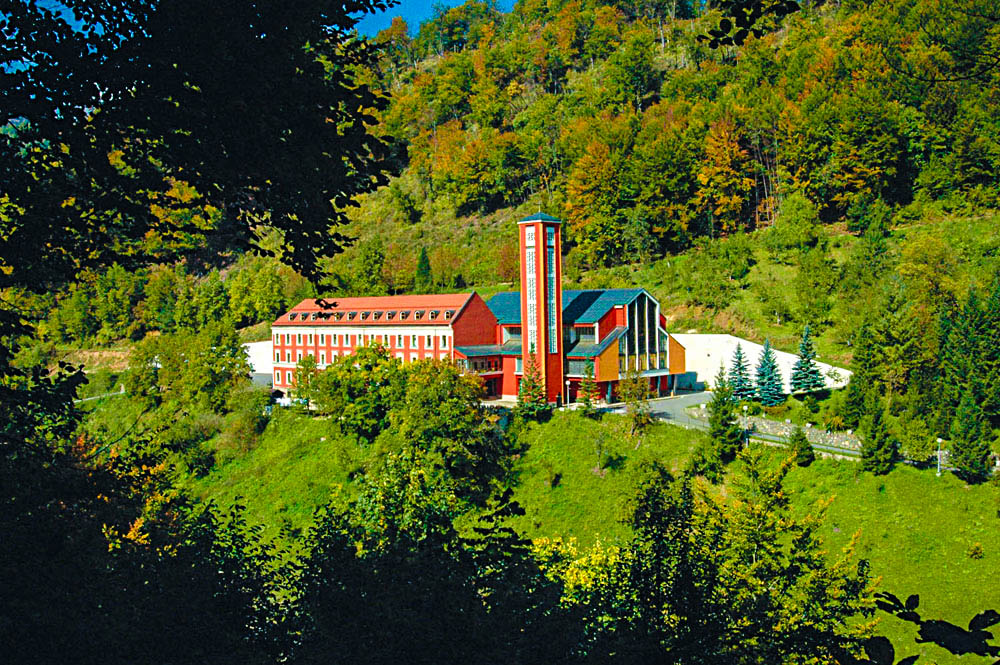
Franciscan monastery in Kreševo

Even though the Ottoman period was harsh for the Kreševo area, as well as for the whole Bosnia, the status of Kreševo area was relatively favorable due to mines, smiths and other craftsmen and merchants. The Ottoman adopted almost entire legal regulative of the area (Kanun-sas, translated as the Laws of the Saxons), as well as the technology of craft and ore processing. Those law regulations remained in power until the Austro-Hungarian rule in Bosnia and Herzegovina. Those qanuns (laws) provided autonomy for metallurgists, regulated the property rights between copartners and established executive bodies (an assembly, a knyaz and a messenger). As only Catholics were in the iron business, there were some favourable conditions for their existence as well as religious and cultural autonomy. The main product of the Kreševo area until 17th century was silver, when it was replaced by iron whose exploitation and processing found a wide range of usage.

The main products of Kreševan smiths were, among other things, horseshoes and nails. The horseshoes were of the "Arabic model" and were known for their quality on the entire Balkans. Along with horseshoes, Kreševan smiths produced door locks, which were of "Ragusan model" with six feathers. During that time, Kreševo was a large workshop with high metal production and economic development.

A detailed description of Kreševo was made by an Austrian Croat intelligence officer, certain sergeant major Božić, in 1785, prior to the Austro-Turkish War. Božić wrote that there are some 200 Christian households and 100 Muslim households, a Franciscan monastery with 30 friars and the fortress of the old town. He also mentioned the village of Vranke in which medical devices were produced. Further Božić wrote that there were 10–12 Christian households in Deževice and 7–8 Christian households in Kojsin. He also mentioned villages of Stojčići and Crnići with around 45 households. In 1848, the Franciscans established an elementary school, second in the entire Bosnia and Herzegovina.

=== Austrian-Hungary ===
After establishing the Austro-Hungarian rule in Bosnia and Herzegovina, Kreševo saw a period of stagnation. The previous rural economy was replaced by capitalism. The new modern technology in the area of mine and metallurgy production was introduced. This ended the local mining and crafts, which entered a major crisis and later entirely disappeared, and was replaced by the industrial production. The turning points occurred when blast furnaces were built in Vareš in 1891 and Zenica in 1893. After that, iron operation in Kreševo stalled. For this reason, the Kreševan economy entered the hardest period in its history.

The Austrian-Hungarian administration forbade the free forest cutting, which influenced the production of charcoal necessary for the iron production. This led to depopulation and displacement of the population to the other mining and metallurgy centres of the central Bosnia. Kreševans opposed to those new legislations. Later, the Austrian-Hungarian administration built a macadam road towards Kiseljak and connected Kreševo with rest of the country. After that, measures for saving Kreševo's economy were taken, so a smiths' cooperative was founded in 1908, which remained active until 1948, when it was transformed to the "Čelik" company.

In the Austria-Hungary, Kreševo was a district branch of the Fojnica District (Serbo-Croatian: kotar) in the Sarajevo Province (Serbo-Croatian: okrug). In 1879, Kreševo had 261 households and 1319 inhabitants, and in 1910 it had 316 households and 1043 inhabitants, of which 860 Catholics, 175 Muslims and 2 Orthodox. The Kreševan population was engaged in agriculture, animal husbandry and beekeeping. Kreševo had a branch of a weaving company "Tkaonica ćilima Sarajevo", a furrier and a smithy with a motor engine. Iron products were made, mostly horseshoes and nails, and there was also a nearby mine owed by Graf Ogsz Orzechowski.

In 1901, the Croatian national reading room and library were established. Kreševo was the first among minor towns to have a water supply, a public bath, a pool, a phone line and a hydroelectric power plant. The town also had a gendarmerie station, a post office, a telegraph, an elementary school, a Muslim mektab, a Franciscan monastery, a Catholic parish and a Muslim mosque.

=== Communist Yugoslavia ===
After the World War II, the old production traditions were continued, but on the new foundations. The old smith craft was transferred into industrial production by establishing the "Čelik" company and number of privately owned blacksmiths were modernised. The mining saw a great development by founding the company for production and processing of mineral resources named "Barit". The textile tradition was also continued by founding the "Autooprema" company, a successor of the "Tvornica ćilima Sarajevo" from the Austrian-Hungarian period.

=== Džemal Bijedić's plane crash ===
Kreševo is also a footnote in history because of the death here of Džemal Bijedić. Bijedić served as Prime Minister of Yugoslavia from July 1971 until his death in a plane crash in January 1977. The Learjet 25 that carried Bijedić, his wife Razija, and six others crashed on the Inač mountain near Kreševo on 18 January 1977. The aircraft ostensibly crashed due to poor weather conditions, but conspiracy theorists have suggested foul play.

=== Democratic period ===
After the war in Bosnia and Herzegovina, the economy of Kreševo saw a rebirth. Along with existing traditional activity, the new factories for meat production and meat processing, production of dry mortar, construction metalware, joinery, furniture, styrofoam, sponge were opened. The construction had become one of the major economy branches of Kreševo. Today, Kreševo is among the rare municipalities in Bosnia and Herzegovina where unemployment is almost non-existing.

== Demographics ==
Year	Croats	%	Bosniaks	%	Serbs	%	others	%	Total	±%	Ref.
1961	5,009	77.44	845	13.06	144	2.23	470	7.27	6,468	—	
1971	5,284	76.13	1,484	21.38	118	1.70	55	0.79	6,941	+7.3%	
1981	5,012	74.08	1,498	22.14	54	0.80	202	2.99	6,766	−2.5%	
1991	4,714	70.03	1,531	22.75	34	0.51	452	6.72	6,731	−0.5%	
2013	4,149	78.68	1,014	19.23	26	0.49	53	1.00	5,273	−16.2%	

=== Settlements ===
Settlement	Population (1991)
Alagići	229
Bjelovići	260
Botunja	178
Bukva	163
Crkvenjak	61
Crnički Kamenik	157
Crnići	465
Deževice	246
Drežnice	87
Gunjar	124
Kojsina	226
Komari	100
Kreševo	1,433
Kreševski Kamenik	197
Lipa	92
Martinići	557
Pirin	160
Poljani	53
Polje (Kreševo)	482
Rakova Noga	407
Ratkovići	94
Stojčići	390
Vidosovići	32
Vodovoji	65
Volujak	306
Vranci	97
Zvizd	70

== Economy ==
After the World War II, Kreševo saw a steady economic development. The traditional blacksmith craft was transferred to the industrial production with the foundation of the "Čelik" company, which grew from the smiths' cooperative. Other smiths and metal processors united in a crafts cooperative named "Unikov". Old blacksmiths were eventually shot down, and those left were modernised. The mining also saw a great development, especially with the founding of a company for production and processing of mineral resources named "Barit". The textile industry from the Austrian-Hungarian era was also continued with foundation of the "Autooprema" company, which, however, remains small.

After the war in Bosnia and Herzegovina, the privatisation process was mishandled and many markets were lost; technical backwardness and low productivity led to the reduction of economic activity in these sectors. The private sector expanded on other economic activities, such as meat production and processing, styrofoam production, dry mortar production and furniture production. From traditional economic activities, only metal processing and wood processing saw increase.

Currently, there are around 70 economic companies in the Kreševo Municipality. There are around 130 commercial and tourist-catering activities. The production and service sector is also increasing.

== Politics ==
=== Municipal government ===
The current municipality president of Kreševo is Renato Pejak (2020), a member of the HDZ BiH.

=== Municipal council ===
Municipal Council of Kreševo Općinsko vijeće Kreševo

Type
- Type: Unicameral

Leadership
- Chairman: Mirsad Beganović, SDA

Structure
- Seats: 15 council members
- HDZ BiH: 10 / 15
- SDA: 3 / 15
- SDP BiH: 1 / 15
- HDZ 1990: 1 / 15

Elections
- Last election: 15 November 2020

Council of Kreševo is a representative body of Kreševo's citizens and a body of local self-administration. It has 15 representatives. Last election for the Council of Kreševo were held in October 2012. President of the Council of Kreševo is Mirsad Beganović of the Party of Democratic Action.

== Sports ==
The town is home to the football club NK Kreševo-Stanić.

In mountaineering, its local HPS chapter HPD "Bitovnja" was founded on 4 August 1937. Its first president was Augustin Tvrtković.

== Features ==
The Franciscan monastery St. Catharine there has been serving its community for centuries and the Catholic traditions here are very strong. The monastery has a rustic museum, library and gallery. The monastery as an architectural ensemble, together with a number of its movable property and items, is being included by KONS into the List of National Monuments of Bosnia and Herzegovina since 2003. Famous student of the seminary in Kreševo include Albanian poet Gjergj Fishta.

With no more than a few thousand inhabitants, medieval Kreševo expanded with the arrival of Saxon blacksmiths. In several areas of Bosnia, small Saxon and Ragusan mining communities were established. The noble families of the Bosnian state were keen to exploit the plentiful resources of gold and silver but they didn't have the skills to do so. The craft was passed on from these migrant miners and can be found today in the old town.

== See also ==
- Dragutin Lerman
