= List of Australian states and territories by Human Development Index =

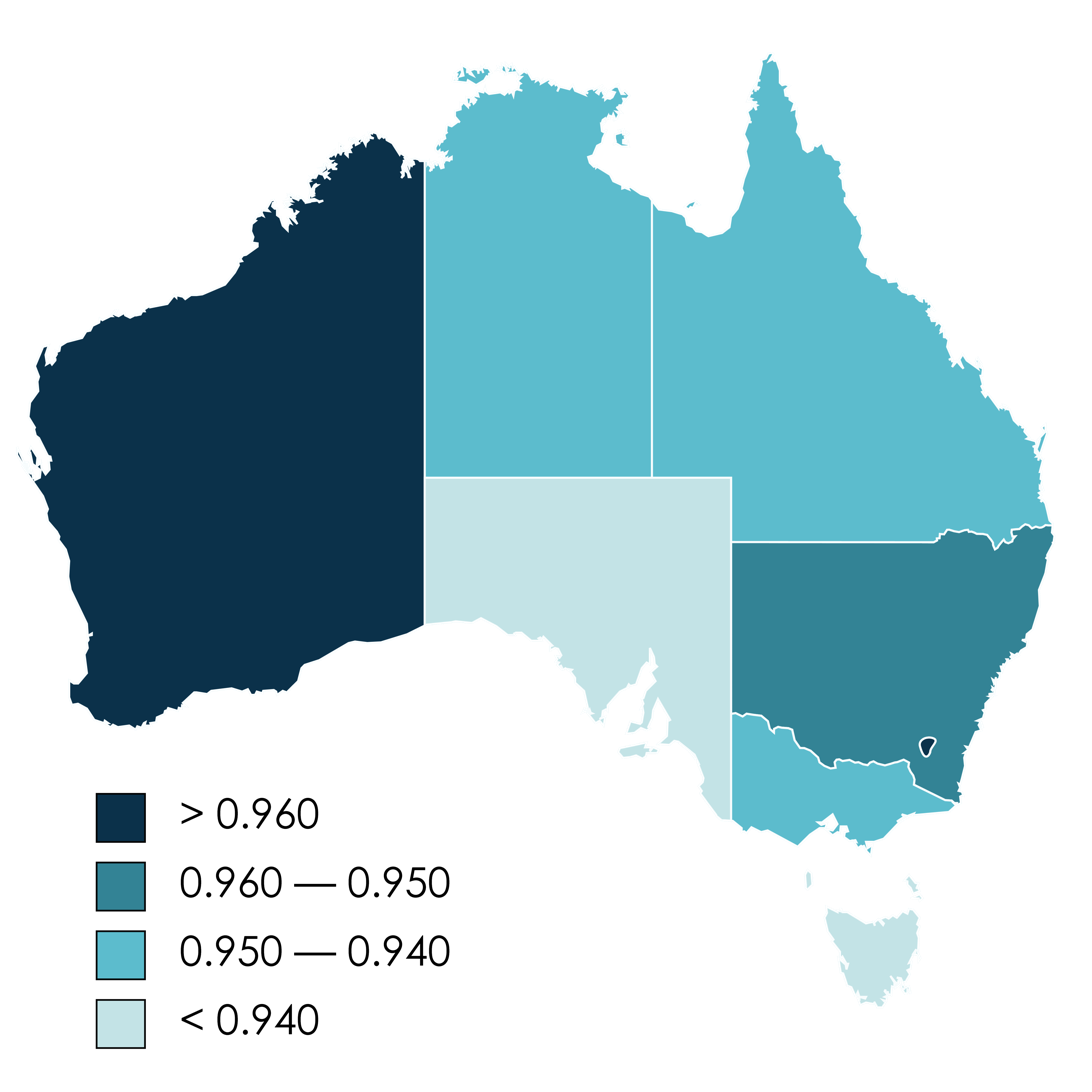
Map of Australian states and internal territories by HDI in 2021.

Below is a list of the Australian states and territories by the Human Development Index, as provided by the 2023 sub-national data set (released in 2025), which is a comparative measure of life expectancy, literacy, education, standard of living, and overall well-being of the citizens in each states. All Australian states have a very high (greater than 0.800) HDI value.

The Australian Capital Territory and Western Australia have a higher HDI value than Iceland (0.972), the highest-ranked country in the world.

As of 2025, the Australian Capital Territory had the second highest HDI rating of any sub-national region in the world, behind only the Canton of Zurich (0.993).

== Ranking ==
| Rank | State or territory | HDI (2023) |
Very High Human Development
| 1 | Australian Capital Territory | 0.988 |
| 2 | Western Australia | 0.973 |
| 3 | New South Wales | 0.958 |
| – | Australia | 0.958 |
| 4 | Victoria | 0.954 |
| 5 | Queensland | 0.947 |
| 6 | South Australia | 0.944 |
| 6 | Northern Territory | 0.944 |
| 8 | Tasmania | 0.935 |

== See also ==
- List of countries by Human Development Index
- List of countries by inequality-adjusted Human Development Index
- List of countries by planetary pressures–adjusted Human Development Index
- List of regions of New Zealand by Human Development Index
