= Indian states ranking by school enrollment rate =

This is a list of States and Union Territories of India ranked according to Gross Enrollment Ratio (GER) of students in Classes I to VIII (6–13 yrs). The list is compiled from the Statistics of School Education- 2010–11 Report by Ministry of HRD, Government of India.

== List ==
Gross enrolment ratio (GER) is a statistical measure used in the education sector and by the UN in its Education Index to determine the number of students enrolled in school at several different grade levels (like elementary, middle school and high school), and examine it to analyze the ratio of the number of students who live in that country to those who qualify for the particular grade level.

Rank	State	Gross Enrollment Ratio for Classes I-VIII (6–13 yrs) 2011
1	Manipur	155.0
2	Meghalaya	153.6
3	Arunachal Pradesh	152.0
4	Mizoram	150.7
5	Sikkim	123.8
6	Madhya Pradesh	122.6
7	Jharkhand	121.0
8	Tripura	115.4
9	Kerala	115.2
10	Tamil Nadu	112.0
11	Himachal Pradesh	111.0
12	Uttar Pradesh	109.5
13	Chhattisgarh	109.4
14	Uttarakhand	107.8
15	Gujarat	107.2
16	Odisha	104.8
**	All India Average	104.3
17	Jammu and Kashmir	104.2
18	Punjab	103.1
19	Bihar	102.9
20	Goa	101.0
21	Maharashtra	100.0
22	Rajasthan	99.3
23	Karnataka	99.3
24	Andhra Pradesh	92.0
25	Haryana	90.5
26	West Bengal	90.1
27	Nagaland	85.4
28	Assam	84.0
U/T	Delhi	120.1
U/T	Dadra and Nagar Haveli	103.9
U/T	Puducherry	103.4
U/T	Andaman and Nicobar Islands	86.9
U/T	Chandigarh	79.3
U/T	Daman and Diu	78.2
