= Human Development Index =

Composite statistic of life expectancy, education, and income indices

World map of countries or territories by HDI scores in increments of 0.050 (based on 2023 data, published in 2025): ≥ 0.950; 0.900–0.950; 0.850–0.899; 0.800–0.849; 0.750–0.799; 0.700–0.749; 0.650–0.699; 0.600–0.649; 0.550–0.599; 0.500–0.549; 0.450–0.499; 0.400–0.449; ≤ 0.399; Data unavailable

The Human Development Index (HDI) is a statistical composite index of life expectancy, education (mean years of schooling completed, expected years of schooling upon entering the education system), and per capita income indicators, which is used to rank countries into four tiers of human development. A country scores a higher level of HDI when the lifespan, education level and gross national income GNI (PPP) per capita are higher. It was developed by Pakistani economist Mahbub ul-Haq and was further used to measure a country's development by the United Nations Development Programme (UNDP)'s Human Development Report Office.

The 2010 Human Development Report introduced an inequality-adjusted Human Development Index (IHDI). While the simple HDI remains useful, it states that "the IHDI is the actual level of human development (accounting for this inequality), while the HDI can be viewed as an index of 'potential' human development (or the maximum level of HDI) that could be achieved if there were no inequality."

The index is based on the human development approach, developed by Mahbub ul-Haq, anchored in Amartya Sen's work on human capabilities, and often framed in terms of whether people are able to "be" and "do" desirable things in life. Examples include — being: well-fed, sheltered, and healthy; doing: work, education, voting, and participating in community life. The freedom of choice is considered central — someone choosing to be hungry (e.g. when fasting for religious reasons) is considered different from someone who is hungry because they cannot afford to buy food, or because the country is going through a famine.

The index does not take into account several factors, such as the net wealth per capita or the relative quality of goods in a country. This situation tends to lower the ranking of some of the most developed countries, such as the G7 members and others.

== Origins ==
The origins of the HDI are found in the annual Human Development Reports produced by the Human Development Report Office of the United Nations Development Programme (UNDP). These annual reports were devised and launched by Pakistani economist Mahbub ul-Haq in 1990, and had the explicit purpose "to shift the focus of development economics from national income accounting to people-centered policies". He believed that a simple composite measure of human development was needed to convince the public, academics and politicians that they can, and should, evaluate development not only by economic advances but also improvements in human well-being.

The underlying principle behind the Human Development Index

== Dimensions and calculation ==
=== New method (2010 HDI onwards) ===
HDI trends between 1990 and 2021: World OECD countries / Developing countries: Arab States East Asia and the Pacific Europe and Central Asia Latin America and the Caribbean South Asia Sub-Saharan Africa

Published on 4 November 2010 (and updated on 10 June 2011), the 2010 Human Development Report calculated the HDI combining three dimensions:

- A long and healthy life: Life expectancy at birth
- Education: Mean years of schooling and expected years of schooling
- A decent standard of living: GNI per capita (PPP international dollars)

In its 2010 Human Development Report, the UNDP began using a new method of calculating the HDI. The following three indices are used:

1. Life Expectancy Index (LEI) $= \frac{\textrm{LE} - 20}{85-20} = \frac{\textrm{LE} - 20}{65}$

LEI is equal to 1 when life expectancy at birth is 85 years, and 0 when life expectancy at birth is 20 years.

2. Education Index (EI) $= \frac{{\textrm{MYSI} + \textrm{EYSI}}} {2}$

2.1 Mean Years of Schooling Index (MYSI) $= \frac{\textrm{MYS}}{15}$

Fifteen is the projected maximum of this indicator for 2025.

2.2 Expected Years of Schooling Index (EYSI) $= \frac{\textrm{EYS}}{18}$

Eighteen is equivalent to achieving a master's degree in most countries.

3. Income Index (II) $= \frac{\ln(\textrm{GNIpc}) - \ln(100)}{\ln(75,000) - \ln(100)} = \frac{\ln(\textrm{GNIpc}) - \ln(100)}{\ln(750)}$

II is 1 when GNI per capita is $75,000 and 0 when GNI per capita is $100.

Finally, the HDI is the geometric mean of the previous three normalized indices:

$$\textrm{HDI} = \sqrt[3]{\textrm{LEI}\cdot \textrm{EI} \cdot \textrm{II}}.$$

LE: Life expectancy at birth
MYS: Mean years of schooling (i.e. years that a person aged 25 or older has spent in formal education)
EYS: Expected years of schooling (i.e. total expected years of schooling for children under 18 years of age, incl. young men and women aged 13–17)
GNIpc: Gross national income at purchasing power parity per capita

=== Old method (HDI before 2010) ===
The HDI combined three dimensions last used in its 2009 report:

- Life expectancy at birth, as an index of population health and longevity to HDI
- Knowledge and education, as measured by the adult literacy rate (with two-thirds weighting) and the combined primary, secondary, and tertiary gross enrollment ratio (with one-third weighting).
- Standard of living, as indicated by the natural logarithm of gross domestic product per capita at purchasing power parity.

HDI trends between 1975 and 2004: OECD Europe (not in the OECD), and CIS Latin America and the Caribbean East Asia / Arab League South Asia Sub-Saharan Africa

This methodology was used by the UNDP until their 2011 report.

The formula defining the HDI is promulgated by the United Nations Development Programme (UNDP). In general, to transform a raw variable, say $x$, into a unit-free index between 0 and 1 (which allows different indices to be added together), the following formula is used:

- $x\text{ index} = \frac{x - a}{b - a}$

where $a$ and $b$ are the lowest and highest values the variable $x$ can attain, respectively.

The Human Development Index (HDI) then represents the uniformly weighted sum with 1/3 contributed by each of the following factor indices:

- Life Expectancy Index $= \frac{\text{LE} - 25} {85-25} = \frac{\text{LE} - 25} {60}$
- Education Index $= \frac{2} {3} \times \text{ALI} + \frac{1} {3} \times \text{GEI}$
  - Adult Literacy Index (ALI) $= \frac{\text{ALR} - 0} {100 - 0} = \frac{\text{ALR}} {100}$
  - Gross Enrollment Index (GEI) $= \frac{\text{CGER} - 0} {100 - 0} =\frac{\text{CGER}} {100}$
- GDP $= \frac{\log(\text{GDPpc}) - \log(100)} {\log(40000) - \log(100)} = \frac{\log(\text{GDPpc}) - \log(100)} {\log(400)}$

Human development index

== 2023 Human Development Index (2025 report) ==
Average annual HDI growth from 2010 to 2023 (published in 2025): ≥ 1.4%; 1.2%…1.4%; 1%…1.2%; 0.8%…1%; 0.6%…0.8%; 0.4%…0.6%; 0.2%…0.4%; 0%…0.2%; −0.5%…0%; −1%…−0.5%; < −1%; No data

The Human Development Report 2025 by the United Nations Development Programme was released on 6 May 2025; the delayed report calculates HDI values based on data collected two years prior in 2023.

Ranked from 1 to 74 in the year 2023, the following countries are considered to have "very high human development":

Table of countries by HDI
Rank		Country or territory	HDI	
2023 data (2025 report)	Change since 2015	Country or territory	2023 data (2025 report)	Average annual growth (2010–2023)
1	▲ (2)	Iceland	0.972	▲0.28%
2	▼ (1)	Norway	0.970	▲0.25%
2	Steady	Switzerland	0.970	▲0.24%
4	▲ (2)	Denmark	0.962	▲0.35%
5	▼ (1)	Germany	0.959	▲0.19%
5	Steady	Sweden	0.959	▲0.38%
7	▲ (1)	Australia	0.958	▲0.20%
8	▲ (2)	Netherlands	0.955	▲0.26%
8	▼ (1)	Hong Kong	0.955	▲0.38%
10	▲ (3)	Belgium	0.951	▲0.26%
11	▲ (4)	Ireland	0.949	▲0.38%
12	▼ (4)	Finland	0.948	▲0.27%
13	▼ (2)	Singapore	0.946	▲0.25%
13	▲ (2)	United Kingdom	0.946	▲0.24%
15	▲ (27)	United Arab Emirates	0.940	▲1.04%
16	▼ (2)	Canada	0.939	▲0.22%
17	▲ (1)	Liechtenstein	0.938	▲0.23%
17	▼ (5)	New Zealand	0.938	▲0.13%
17	Steady	United States	0.938	▲0.10%
20	▲ (1)	South Korea	0.937	▲0.36%
21	▲ (2)	Slovenia	0.931	▲0.33%
22	▼ (3)	Austria	0.930	▲0.21%
23	▼ (3)	Japan	0.925	▲0.16%
24	▲ (5)	Malta	0.924	▲0.50%
25	▼ (3)	Luxembourg	0.922	▲0.14%
26	▼ (1)	France	0.920	▲0.28%
27	▼ (3)	Israel	0.919	▲0.26%
28	Steady	Spain	0.918	▲0.40%
29	▼ (3)	Czechia	0.915	▲0.22%
29	▲ (1)	Italy	0.915	▲0.24%
29	▼ (2)	San Marino	0.915	▼0.32%
32	▲ (1)	Andorra	0.913	▲0.20%
32	▲ (3)	Cyprus	0.913	▲0.45%
34	▼ (3)	Greece	0.908	▲0.18%
35	▼ (1)	Poland	0.906	▲0.35%
36	▼ (5)	Estonia	0.905	▲0.33%
37	▲ (9)	Saudi Arabia	0.900	▲0.70%
38	▼ (1)	Bahrain	0.899	▲0.80%
39	▼ (4)	Lithuania	0.895	▲0.32%
40	▲ (2)	Portugal	0.890	▲0.42%
41	▼ (1)	Croatia	0.889	▲0.53%
41	▲ (4)	Latvia	0.889	▲0.51%
43	▼ (4)	Qatar	0.886	▲0.45%
44	▼ (6)	Slovakia	0.880	▲0.14%
45	▼ (1)	Chile	0.878	▲0.47%
46	▲ (1)	Hungary	0.870	▲0.22%
47	▼ (7)	Argentina	0.865	▲0.15%
48	Steady	Montenegro	0.862	▲0.38%
48	▲ (13)	Uruguay	0.862	▲0.47%
50	▲ (1)	Oman	0.858	▲0.22%
51	▲ (7)	Turkey	0.853	▲1.10%
52	▲ (1)	Kuwait	0.852	▲0.36%
53	▼ (5)	Antigua and Barbuda	0.851	▲0.18%
54	▲ (5)	Seychelles	0.848	▲0.30%
55	▲ (1)	Bulgaria	0.845	▲0.09%
55	▲ (2)	Romania	0.845	▲0.14%
57	▲ (6)	Georgia	0.844	▲0.54%
58	▼ (4)	Saint Kitts and Nevis	0.840	▲0.49%
59	▲ (6)	Panama	0.839	▲0.47%
60	▼ (12)	Brunei	0.837	▲0.13%
60	▼ (1)	Kazakhstan	0.837	▲0.38%
62	▲ (3)	Costa Rica	0.833	▲0.39%
62	▲ (5)	Serbia	0.833	▲0.39%
64	▼ (12)	Russia	0.832	▲0.25%
65	▼ (10)	Belarus	0.824	▲0.12%
66	▼ (3)	Bahamas	0.820	▲0.21%
67	▲ (2)	Malaysia	0.819	▲0.41%
68	▲ (4)	North Macedonia	0.815	▲0.21%
69	▲ (9)	Barbados	0.811	▲0.18%
69	Steady	Armenia	0.811	▲0.52%
71	Steady	Albania	0.810	▲0.25%
72	▼ (10)	Trinidad and Tobago	0.807	▲0.30%
73	Steady	Mauritius	0.806	▲0.44%
74	▲ (7)	Bosnia and Herzegovina	0.804	▲0.68%

== Past top countries ==
The list below displays the top-ranked country from each year of the Human Development Index. Norway has been ranked the highest sixteen times, Canada eight times, Iceland three times, and Switzerland and Japan 2 times each.

=== In each original HDI ===
The year represents the time period from which the statistics for the index were derived. In parentheses is the year when the report was published.

- 2023 (2025): Iceland
- 2022 (2024): Switzerland
- 2021 (2022): Switzerland
- 2019 (2020): Norway
- 2018 (2019): Norway
- 2017 (2018): Norway
- 2015 (2016): Norway
- 2014 (2015): Norway
- 2013 (2014): Norway
- 2012 (2013): Norway
- 2011 (2011): Norway
- 2010 (2010): Norway
- 2007 (2009): Norway
- 2006 (2008): Iceland
- 2005 (2007): Iceland
- 2004 (2006): Norway
- 2003 (2005): Norway
- 2002 (2004): Norway
- 2001 (2003): Norway
- 2000 (2002): Norway
- 1999 (2001): Norway
- 1998 (2000): Canada
- 1997 (1999): Canada
- 1995 (1998): Canada
- 1994 (1997): Canada
- 1993 (1996): Canada
- 1992 (1995): Canada
- 1994 (1994): Canada
- 1993 (1993): Japan
- 1990 (1992): Canada
- 1990 (1991): Japan

== Geographical coverage ==
The HDI has extended its geographical coverage: David Hastings, of the United Nations Economic and Social Commission for Asia and the Pacific, published a report geographically extending the HDI to 230+ economies, whereas the UNDP HDI for 2009 enumerates 182 economies and coverage for the 2010 HDI dropped to 169 countries.

== Country/region specific HDI lists ==
- Afghan regions
- Angolan provinces
- African countries
- Albanian counties
- Algerian regions
- Antiguan and Barbudan parishes and dependencies
- Argentine provinces
- Armenian provinces
- Australian states and territories
- Austrian states
- Azerbaijani regions
- Baltic regions
- Bangladeshi districts and divisions
- Belgian provinces
- Bolivian departments
- Bosnia and Herzegovina regions
- Brazilian states
- Canadian provinces and territories
- Chilean regions
- Chinese administrative divisions
- Colombian departments
- Croatian counties
- Czech Regions
- Danish regions
- Dutch provinces
- Egyptian governorates
- Ethiopian regions
- European countries
- Finnish regions
- French regions
- German states
- Georgian regions
- Greek regions
- Indian states
- Tamil Nadu districts (India)
- Indonesian provinces
- Iranian provinces
- Iraqi governorates
- Irish regions
- Italian regions
- Kazakhstan regions
- Japanese prefectures
- Jordanian governorates
- Latin American countries
- Malaysian states
- Mexican states
- Myanmar administrative divisions
- Nepalese provinces
- New Zealand regions
- Nigerian states
- Norwegian regions
- Philippine provinces
- Palestinian regions
- Polish voivodeships
- Portuguese Regions
- Romanian regions
- Russian federal subjects
- Serbian Regions
- Slovak Regions
- South African provinces
- South Korean regions
- Spanish communities
- Swedish regions
- Syrian governorates
- Swiss regions
- Thai regions
- Turkish regions
- UK regions
- Ukrainian regions
- U.S. states (American Human Development Report (AHDR))
- Venezuelan states
- Vietnamese regions

== Criticism ==
HDI in relation to consumption-based CO_{2} emissions per capita

The Human Development Index has been criticized on a number of grounds, including focusing exclusively on national performance and ranking, lack of attention to development from a global perspective, measurement error of the underlying statistics, and on the UNDP's changes in formula which can lead to severe misclassification of "low", "medium", "high" or "very high" human development countries.

There have also been various criticism towards the lack of consideration regarding sustainability (later addressed by the planetary pressures-adjusted HDI), social inequality (addressed by the inequality-adjusted HDI), unemployment or democracy.

The removal of literacy from HDI has been criticized because educational attainment evaluates only the quantity of education but not the quality or the outcomes of education and can result in perverse incentives.

Economists Hendrik Wolff, Howard Chong and Maximilian Auffhammer discuss the HDI from the perspective of data error in the underlying health, education and income statistics used to construct the HDI. They have identified three sources of data error which are: (i) data updating, (ii) formula revisions and (iii) thresholds to classify a country's development status. They conclude that 11%, 21% and 34% of all countries can be interpreted as currently misclassified in the development bins due to the three sources of data error, respectively. Wolff, Chong and Auffhammer suggest that the United Nations should discontinue the practice of classifying countries into development bins because the cut-off values seem arbitrary, and the classifications can provide incentives for strategic behavior in reporting official statistics, as well as having the potential to misguide politicians, investors, charity donors and the public who use the HDI at large.

In 2010, the UNDP reacted to the criticism by updating the thresholds to classify nations as low, medium, and high human development countries. In a comment to The Economist in early January 2011, the Human Development Report Office responded to an article published in the magazine on 6 January 2011 which discusses the Wolff et al. paper. The Human Development Report Office states that they undertook a systematic revision of the methods used for the calculation of the HDI, and that the new methodology directly addresses the critique by Wolff et al. in that it generates a system for continuously updating the human-development categories whenever formula or data revisions take place.

In 2013, Salvatore Monni and Alessandro Spaventa emphasized that in the debate of GDP versus HDI, it is often forgotten that these are both external indicators that prioritize different benchmarks upon which the quantification of societal welfare can be predicated. The larger question is whether it is possible to shift the focus of policy from a battle between competing paradigms to a mechanism for eliciting information on well-being directly from the population.

== See also ==
- Gender Development Index
- Corruption Perceptions Index
- Gender Inequality Index
- International development
- Legatum Prosperity Index
- List of sovereign states by percentage of population living in poverty
- OECD Better Life Index (BLI)
- Right to an adequate standard of living
- Social Progress Index
- Sustainable Development Goals (SDGs)
- Where-to-be-born Index
- World Happiness Report
