= List of Norwegian regions by Human Development Index =

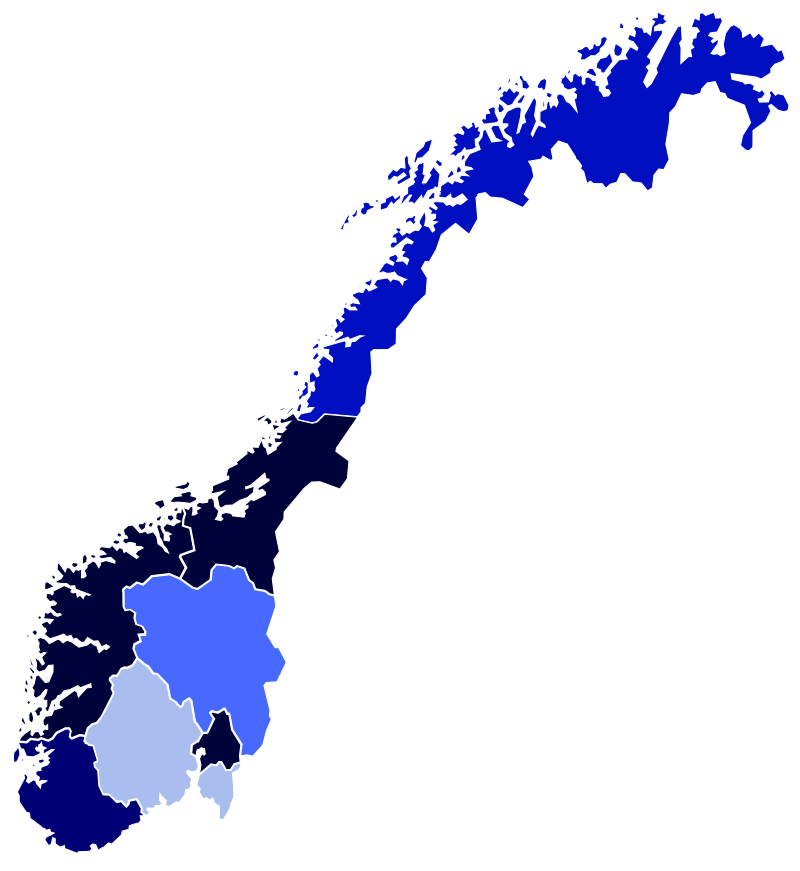
Map of the Norwegian regions by Human Development Index in 2019 Legend: > 0.950 0.950 - 0.940 0.940 - 0.930 0.930 - 0.920 < 0.920

This is a list of NUTS2 statistical regions of Norway by the Human Development Index, as of 2023.

Rank	Region	HDI (2023)
Very High Human Development
1	Oslo and Akershus	0.982
2	Vestlandet (Hordaland, Sogn og Fjordane, Møre og Romsdal)	0.974
3	Trøndelag (Sør-Trøndelag, Nord-Trøndelag)	0.972
4	Agder and Rogaland (Aust-Agder, Vest-Agder, Rogaland)	0.970
–	Norway	0.970
5	Nord-Norge (Nordland, Troms, Finnmark)	0.962
6	Sør-Østlandet (Østfold, Buskerud, Vestfold, Telemark)	0.959
7	Hedmark and Oppland	0.958

== See also ==
- List of countries by Human Development Index
- List of countries by inequality-adjusted Human Development Index
- List of countries by planetary pressures–adjusted Human Development Index
