= List of regions of South Korea by Human Development Index =

Map of the South Korean regions by HDI in 2018. Legend: > 0.920 0.900 – 0.920 0.890 – 0.900 0.880 – 0.890 < 0.880

This is a list of regions of South Korea by Human Development Index as of 2024 with data for the year 2023.

Rank	Region	HDI (2023)
Very high human development
1	Capital Area (Gyeonggi, Seoul, Incheon)	0.967
–	South Korea (average)	0.937
2	Gyeongnam [Southern Gyeongsang] (South Gyeongsang, Busan, Ulsan)	0.934
3	Chungcheong (North Chungcheong, South Chungcheong, Daejeon, Sejong)	0.920
4	Jeolla (North Jeolla, South Jeolla, Gwangju)	0.917
5	Gangwon	0.914
6	Jeju	0.911
7	Gyeongbuk [Northern Gyeongsang] (North Gyeongsang, Daegu)	0.873

== See also ==
- List of countries by Human Development Index
