= Regions of France =

Administrative divisions of France

Regions of France Régions de France (French)
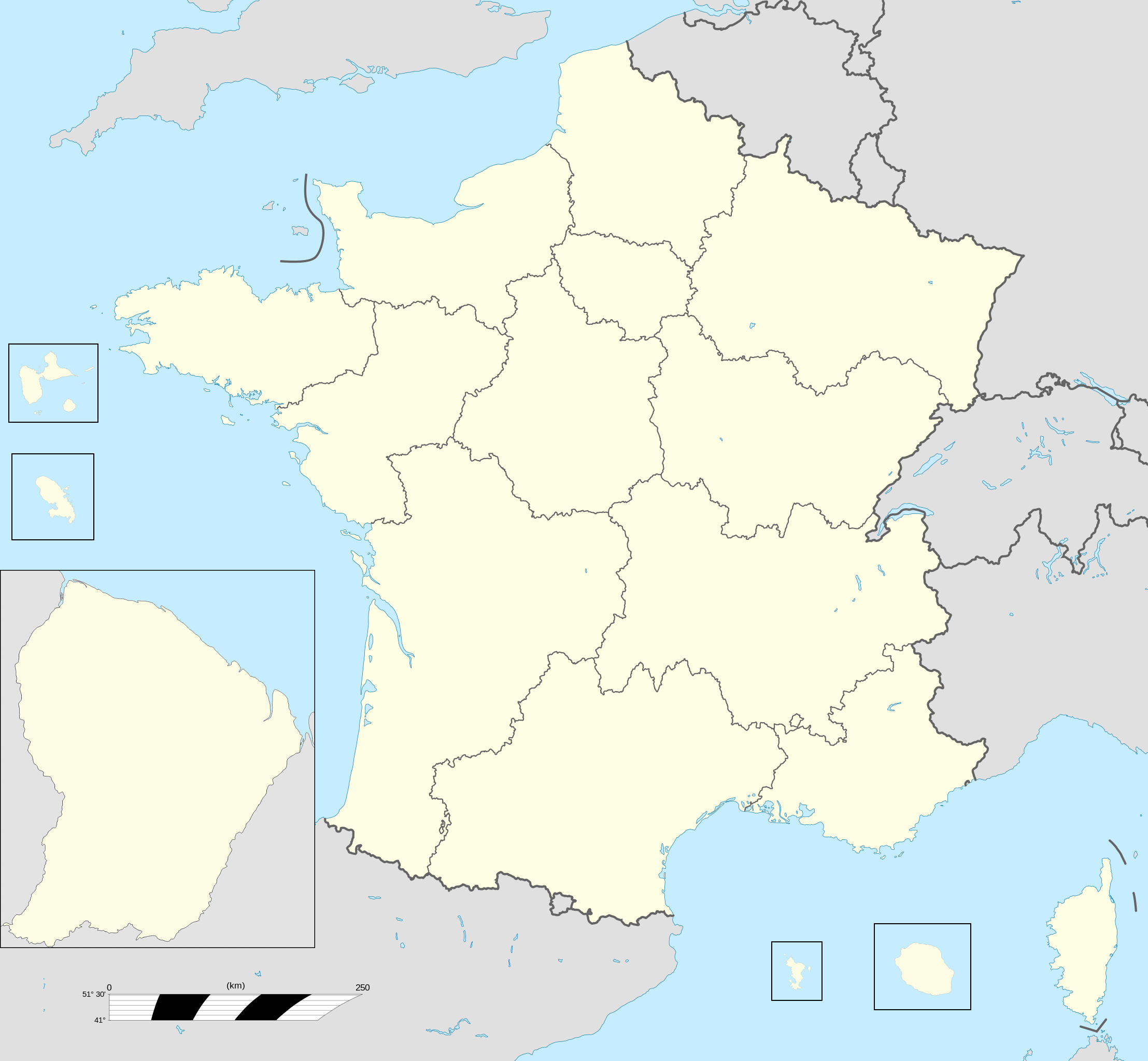
- Category: Unitary state
- Location: French Republic
- Number: 18
- Possible status: Overseas region (région d'outre-mer) (5)
- Additional status: Territorial collectivity (collectivité territoriale)
- Populations: 279,471 (Mayotte) – 12,997,058 (Île-de-France)
- Areas: 376 km^{2} (145 sq mi) (Mayotte) – 84,061 km^{2} (32,456 sq mi) (Nouvelle-Aquitaine)
- Government: Regional Government, National Government
- Subdivisions: Department

France is divided into eighteen administrative regions (French: régions administratives, singular région administrative or just région, [ʁeʒjɔ̃]). Twelve of which are located in the Hexagon (in Europe), another one is Corsica, while the other five are overseas regions (not to be confused with the overseas collectivities, which have a semi-autonomous status).

All of the thirteen metropolitan administrative regions (including Corsica as of 2019) are further subdivided into two to thirteen administrative departments, with the prefect of each region's administrative centre's department also acting as the regional prefect. The overseas regions administratively consist of only one department each and hence also have the status of overseas departments.

Most administrative regions also have the status of regional territorial collectivities, which comes with a local government, with departmental and communal collectivities below the regional level. The exceptions are Corsica, French Guiana, Mayotte and Martinique, where region and department functions are managed by single local governments having consolidated jurisdiction and which are known as single territorial collectivities.

== History ==
=== 1982–2015 ===
The term région was officially created by the Law of Decentralisation (2 March 1982), which also gave regions their legal status. The first direct elections for regional representatives took place on 16 March 1986.

Between 1982 and 2015, there were 22 regions in Metropolitan France. Before 2011, there were four overseas regions (French Guiana, Guadeloupe, Martinique, and Réunion); in 2011 Mayotte became the fifth.

Regions of France between 2011 and 2015
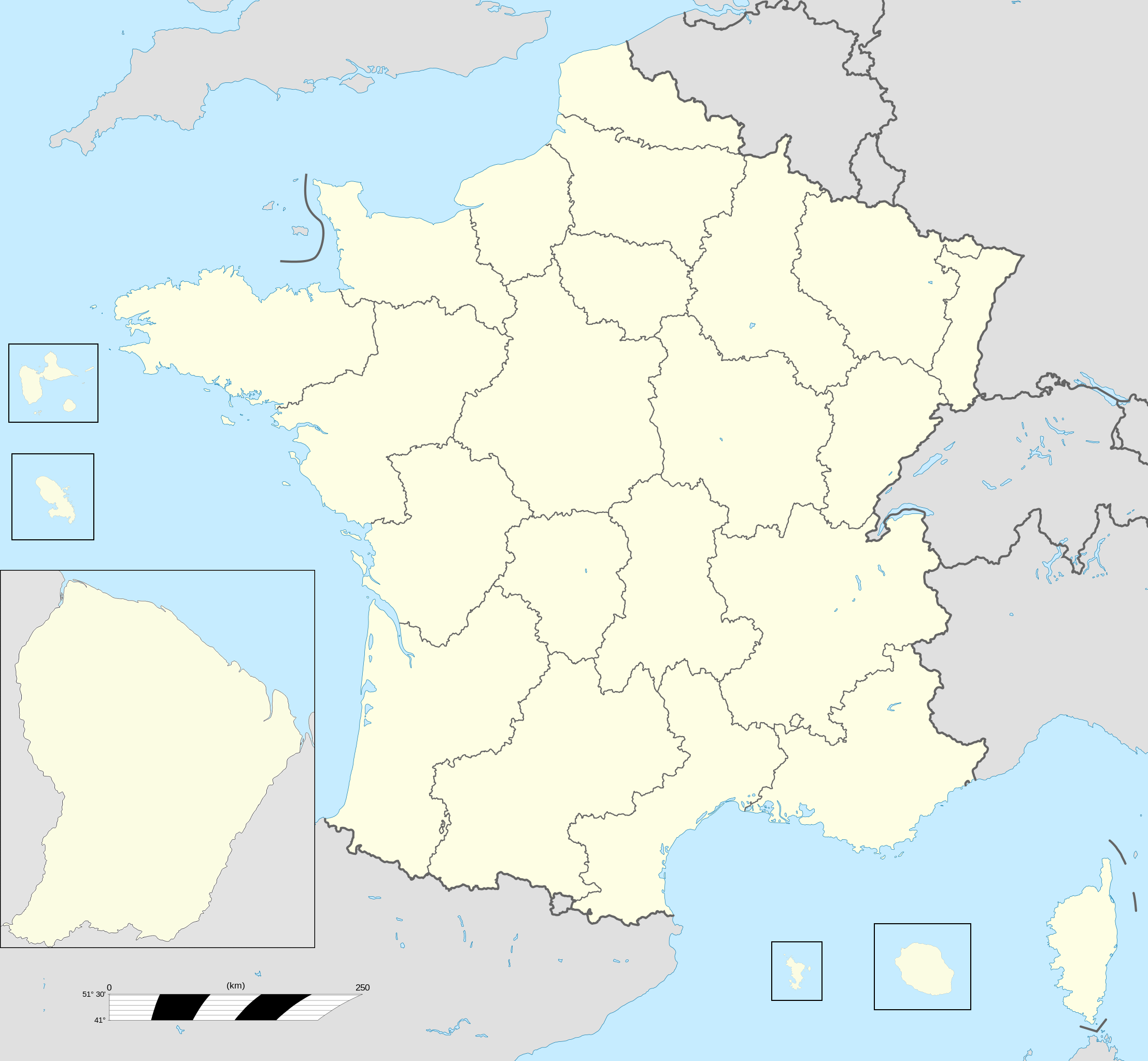

Regions in Metropolitan France between 1982 and 2015
Region	French name	Other local name(s)	INSEE No.	Capital	Derivation or etymology
Alsace	Alsace	Alsatian: Elsàss; German: Elsass	42	Strasbourg	Formerly a coalition of free cities in Holy Roman Empire, attached to Kingdom of France in 1648; annexed by Germany from Franco-Prussian War to the end of World War I and briefly during World War II
Aquitaine	Aquitaine	Occitan: Aquitània; Basque: Akitania; Saintongeais : Aguiéne	72	Bordeaux	Guyenne and Gascony
Auvergne	Auvergne	Occitan: Auvèrnhe / Auvèrnha	83	Clermont-Ferrand	Former province of Auvergne
Brittany	Bretagne	Breton: Breizh; Gallo: Bertaèyn	53	Rennes	Duchy of Brittany
Burgundy	Bourgogne	Burgundian: Bregogne / Borgoégne; Arpitan: Borgogne	26	Dijon	Duchy of Burgundy
Centre-Val de Loire	Centre-Val de Loire		24	Orléans	Located in north-central France; straddles the middle of the Loire Valley
Champagne-Ardenne	Champagne-Ardenne		21	Châlons-en- Champagne	Former province of Champagne
Corsica	Corse		94	Ajaccio	
Franche-Comté	Franche-Comté	Franc-Comtois: Fràntche-Comté; Arpitan: Franche-Comtât	43	Besançon	Free County of Burgundy (Franche-Comté)
Île-de-France	Île-de-France		11	Paris	Province of Île-de-France and parts of the former province of Champagne
Languedoc-Roussillon	Languedoc-Roussillon	Occitan: Lengadòc-Rosselhon; Catalan: Llenguadoc-Rosselló	91	Montpellier	Former provinces of Languedoc and Roussillon
Limousin	Limousin	Occitan: Lemosin	74	Limoges	Former province of Limousin and parts of Marche, Berry, Auvergne, Poitou and Angoumois
Lorraine	Lorraine	German: Lothringen; Lorraine Franconian: Lottringe	41	Metz	Named for Charlemagne's son Lothair I, the kingdom of Lotharingia is etymologically the source for the name Lorraine (duchy), Lothringen (German), Lottringe (Lorraine Franconian)
Lower Normandy	Basse-Normandie	Norman: Basse-Normaundie; Breton: Normandi-Izel	25	Caen	Western half of former province of Normandy
Midi-Pyrénées	Midi-Pyrénées	Occitan: Miègjorn-Pirenèus; Occitan: Mieidia-Pirenèus	73	Toulouse	None; created for Toulouse
Nord-Pas-de-Calais	Nord-Pas-de-Calais	Picard: Nord-Pas-Calés	31	Lille	Nord and Pas-de-Calais departments
Pays de la Loire	Pays de la Loire	Breton: Broioù al Liger	52	Nantes	None; created for Nantes
Picardy	Picardie		22	Amiens	Former province of Picardy
Poitou-Charentes	Poitou-Charentes	Occitan: Peitau-Charantas; Poitevin and Saintongeais : Poetou-Chérentes	54	Poitiers	Former provinces of Angoumois, Aunis, Poitou and Saintonge
Provence-Alpes-Côte d'Azur (PACA)	Provence-Alpes-Côte d'Azur (PACA)	Provençal: Provença-Aups-Còsta d'Azur (Prouvènço-Aup-Costo d'Azur)	93	Marseille	Former historical province of Provence and County of Nice annexed by France in 1860.
Rhône-Alpes	Rhône-Alpes	Arpitan: Rôno-Arpes; Occitan: Ròse Aups	82	Lyon	Created for Lyon from Dauphiné and Lyonnais provinces and Savoy
Upper Normandy	Haute-Normandie	Norman: Ĥâote-Normaundie; Breton: Normandi-Uhel	23	Rouen	Eastern half of former province of Normandy

=== Reform and mergers of regions ===
In 2014, the French parliament passed a law reducing the number of metropolitan regions from 22 to 13 effective 1 January 2016.

The law gave interim names for most of the new regions by combining the names of the former regions, e.g. the region composed of Aquitaine, Poitou-Charentes and Limousin was temporarily called Aquitaine-Limousin-Poitou-Charentes. However, the combined region of Upper and Lower Normandy was simply called "Normandy" (Normandie). Permanent names were proposed by the new regional councils by 1 July 2016 and new names confirmed by the Conseil d'État by 30 September 2016. The legislation defining the new regions also allowed the Centre region to officially change its name to "Centre-Val de Loire" with effect from January 2015. Two regions, Auvergne-Rhône-Alpes and Bourgogne-Franche-Comté, opted to retain their interim names.

Overview of merger proposals for the metropolitan territory

Édouard Balladur's proposal

Manuel Valls's proposal A

Manuel Valls's proposal B

President François Hollande's proposal

Regions as instituted by the National Assembly in 2014

Given below is a table of former regions and which new region they became part of.

Former region	New region	
Former region	Interim name	Final name
Auvergne	Auvergne-Rhône-Alpes	
Rhône-Alpes	Auvergne-Rhône-Alpes	
Burgundy	Bourgogne-Franche-Comté	
Franche-Comté	Bourgogne-Franche-Comté	
Brittany		
Centre-Val de Loire		
Corsica		
French Guiana		
Alsace	Alsace-Champagne-Ardenne-Lorraine	Grand Est
Champagne-Ardenne	Alsace-Champagne-Ardenne-Lorraine	Grand Est
Lorraine	Alsace-Champagne-Ardenne-Lorraine	Grand Est
Guadeloupe		
Nord-Pas-de-Calais	Nord-Pas-de-Calais-Picardie	Hauts-de-France
Picardy	Nord-Pas-de-Calais-Picardie	Hauts-de-France
Île-de-France		
Martinique		
Mayotte		
Lower Normandy	Normandy	
Upper Normandy	Normandy	
Aquitaine	Aquitaine-Limousin-Poitou-Charentes	Nouvelle-Aquitaine
Limousin	Aquitaine-Limousin-Poitou-Charentes	Nouvelle-Aquitaine
Poitou-Charentes	Aquitaine-Limousin-Poitou-Charentes	Nouvelle-Aquitaine
Languedoc-Roussillon	Languedoc-Roussillon-Midi-Pyrénées	Occitanie
Midi-Pyrénées	Languedoc-Roussillon-Midi-Pyrénées	Occitanie
Pays de la Loire		
Provence-Alpes-Côte d'Azur		
Réunion		

== List of administrative regions ==
Type	Region	Other local name(s)	ISO	INSEE No.	Capital	Area (km^{2})	Population (Note: As of 1 January 2022)	Seats in Regional council	Former regions (until 2016)	President of the Regional Council	Location
Metropolitan	Auvergne-Rhône-Alpes (Auvergne-Rhône-Alps)	Occitan: Auvèrnhe-Ròse-Aups; Arpitan: Ôvèrgne-Rôno-Arpes	FR-ARA	84	Lyon	69,711	8,042,936	204	Auvergne; Rhône-Alpes	Fabrice Pannekoucke (LR)	
Metropolitan	Bourgogne-Franche-Comté (Burgundy-Free-County)	Arpitan: Borgogne-Franche-Comtât	FR-BFC	27	Besançon and Dijon	47,784	2,805,580	100	Burgundy; Franche-Comté	Marie-Guite Dufay (PS)	
Metropolitan	Bretagne (Brittany)	Breton: Breizh; Gallo: Bertaèyn	FR-BRE	53	Rennes	27,208	3,354,854	83	unchanged	Loïg Chesnais-Girard (Ind.)	
Metropolitan	Centre-Val de Loire (Central-Vale of the Loire)		FR-CVL	24	Orléans	39,151	2,573,180	77	unchanged	François Bonneau (PS)	
Metropolitan	Corse (Corsica)	Corsican: Corsica	FR-20R	94	Ajaccio	8,680	340,440	63	unchanged	Marie-Antoinette Maupertuis (FC)	
Metropolitan	Grand Est (Greater East)	German: Großer Osten	FR-GES	44	Strasbourg	57,441	5,556,219	169	Alsace; Champagne-Ardenne; Lorraine	Franck Leroy (Ind.)	
Metropolitan	Hauts-de-France (Heights-of-France)		FR-HDF	32	Lille	31,806	6,004,947	170	Nord-Pas-de-Calais; Picardy	Xavier Bertrand (LR)	
Metropolitan	Île-de-France (Isle-of-France)	Breton: Enez-Frañs	FR-IDF	11	Paris	12,011	12,262,544	209	unchanged	Valérie Pécresse (LR)	
Metropolitan	Normandie (Normandy)	Norman: Normaundie; Breton: Normandi	FR-NOR	28	Caen and Rouen	29,907	3,325,032	102	Upper Normandy; Lower Normandy	Hervé Morin (LC)	
Metropolitan	Nouvelle-Aquitaine (New Aquitaine)	Occitan: Nòva Aquitània / Nava Aquitània / Novela Aquitània; Basque: Akitania Berria	FR-NAQ	75	Bordeaux	84,036	6,010,289	183	Aquitaine; Limousin; Poitou-Charentes	Alain Rousset (PS)	
Metropolitan	Occitanie (Occitania)	Occitan: Occitània; Catalan: Occitània	FR-OCC	76	Toulouse	72,724	5,933,185	158	Languedoc-Roussillon; Midi-Pyrénées	Carole Delga (PS)	
Metropolitan	Pays de la Loire (Lands of the Loire)	Breton: Broioù al Liger	FR-PDL	52	Nantes	32,082	3,806,461	93	unchanged	Christelle Morançais (LR)	
Metropolitan	Provence-Alpes-Côte d'Azur (Provence-Alps-Azure Coast)	Occitan: Provença-Aups-Còsta d'Azur	FR-PAC	93	Marseille	31,400	5,081,101	123	unchanged	Renaud Muselier (RE)	
Overseas	Guadeloupe	Guadeloupean Creole French: Gwadloup	GP	01	Basse-Terre	1,628	384,239	41	unchanged	Ary Chalus (GUSR)	
Overseas	Guyane (French Guiana)	Guianese Creole French: Lagwiyann / Gwiyann	GF	03	Cayenne	83,534	281,678	51	unchanged	Gabriel Serville (PG)	
Overseas	La Réunion (Réunion)	Réunion Creole French: La Rényon	RE	04	Saint-Denis	2,504	861,210	45	unchanged	Huguette Bello (PLR)	
Overseas	Martinique	Saint Lucian Creole French: Matinik	MQ	02	Fort-de-France	1,128	364,508	51	unchanged	Lucien Saliber (DVG)	
Overseas	Mayotte	Maore Comorian: Maore; Malagasy: Mahori	YT	06	Mamoudzou	374	262,895 (Note: As of 2017)	26	unchanged	Ben Issa Ousseni (LR)	
						632,734	68,035,000	1,910			

== Role ==
Regions lack separate legislative authority and therefore cannot write their own statutory law. They levy their own taxes and, in return, receive part of their budget from the central government, which gives them a portion of the taxes it levies. They also have considerable budgets managed by a regional council (conseil régional) made up of representatives voted into office in regional elections.

A region's primary responsibility is to build and furnish high schools. In March 2004, the French central government unveiled a controversial plan to transfer regulation of certain categories of non-teaching school staff to the regional authorities. Critics of this plan contended that tax revenue was insufficient to pay for the resulting costs, and that such measures would increase regional inequalities.

In addition, regions have considerable discretionary power over infrastructural spending, e.g., education, public transit, universities and research, and assistance to business owners. This has meant that the heads of wealthy regions such as Île-de-France or Rhône-Alpes can be high-profile positions.

Proposals to give regions limited legislative autonomy have met with considerable resistance; others propose transferring certain powers from the departments to their respective regions, leaving the former with limited authority.

=== Regional control ===
Number of regions controlled by each coalition since 1986.

Elections	Presidencies			Map
Elections	Left	Right	Other	Map
1986	5	21	–	
1992	4	21	1	
1998	10	15	1	
2004	23	2	1	
2010	23	3	–	
2015	7	8	2	
2021	6	8	4	

== Overseas regions ==
Overseas region (French: Région d'outre-mer) is a recent designation, given to the overseas departments that have similar powers to those of the regions of metropolitan France. As integral parts of the French Republic, they are represented in the National Assembly, Senate and Economic and Social Council, elect a Member of the European Parliament (MEP) and use the euro as their currency.

Although these territories have had these political powers since 1982, when France's decentralisation policy dictated that they be given elected regional councils along with other regional powers, the designation overseas regions dates only to the 2003 constitutional change; indeed, the new wording of the constitution aims to give no precedence to either appellation overseas department or overseas region, although the second is still virtually unused by French media.

The following have overseas region status:

- in the Indian Ocean (Africa):
  - Mayotte
  - Réunion
- in the Americas:
  - French Guiana in South America
  - Guadeloupe in the Antilles (Caribbean)
  - Martinique in the Antilles (Caribbean)

^ Saint Pierre and Miquelon (located just south of Newfoundland, Canada, in North America), once an overseas department, was demoted to a territorial collectivity in 1985.

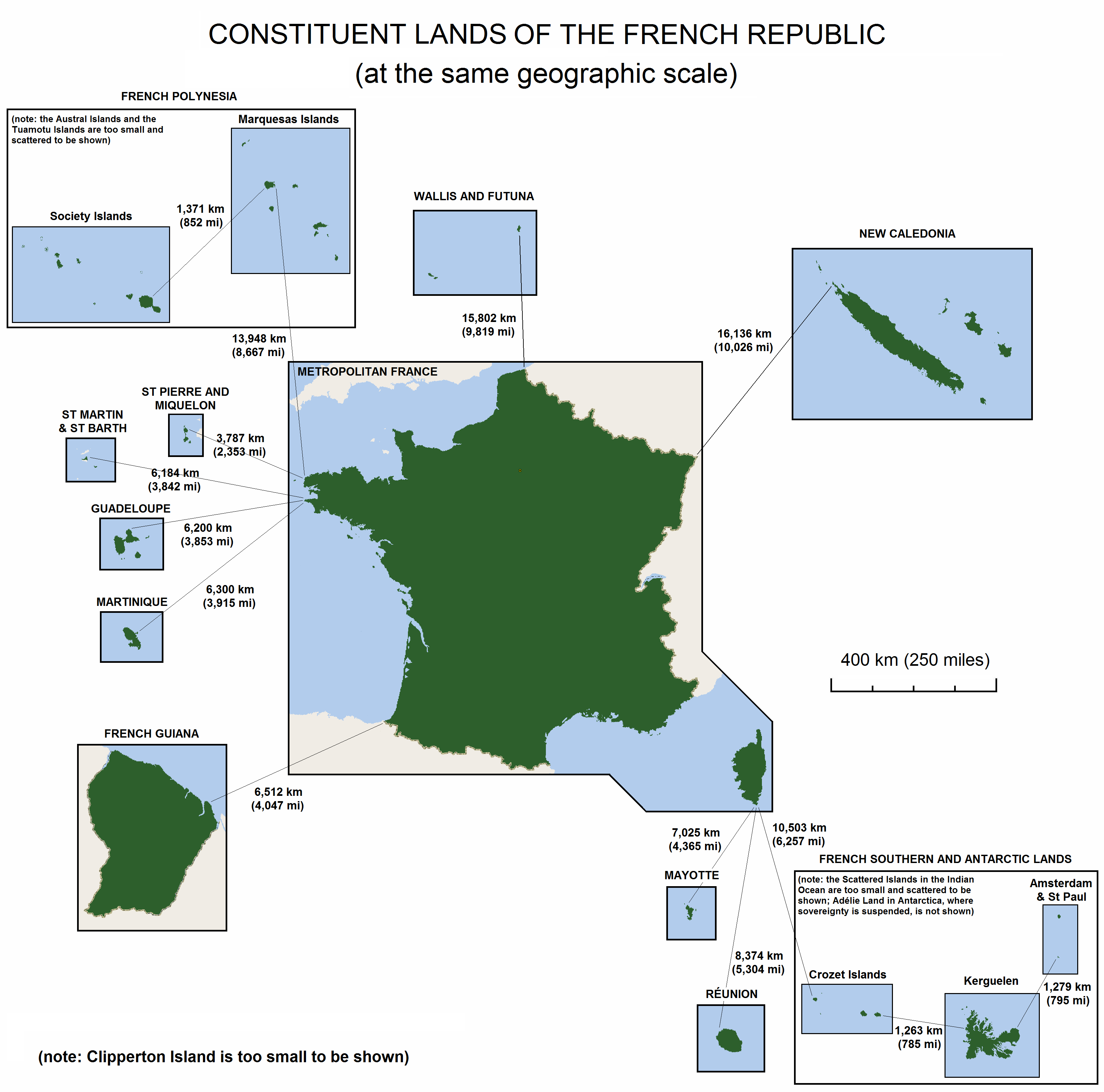

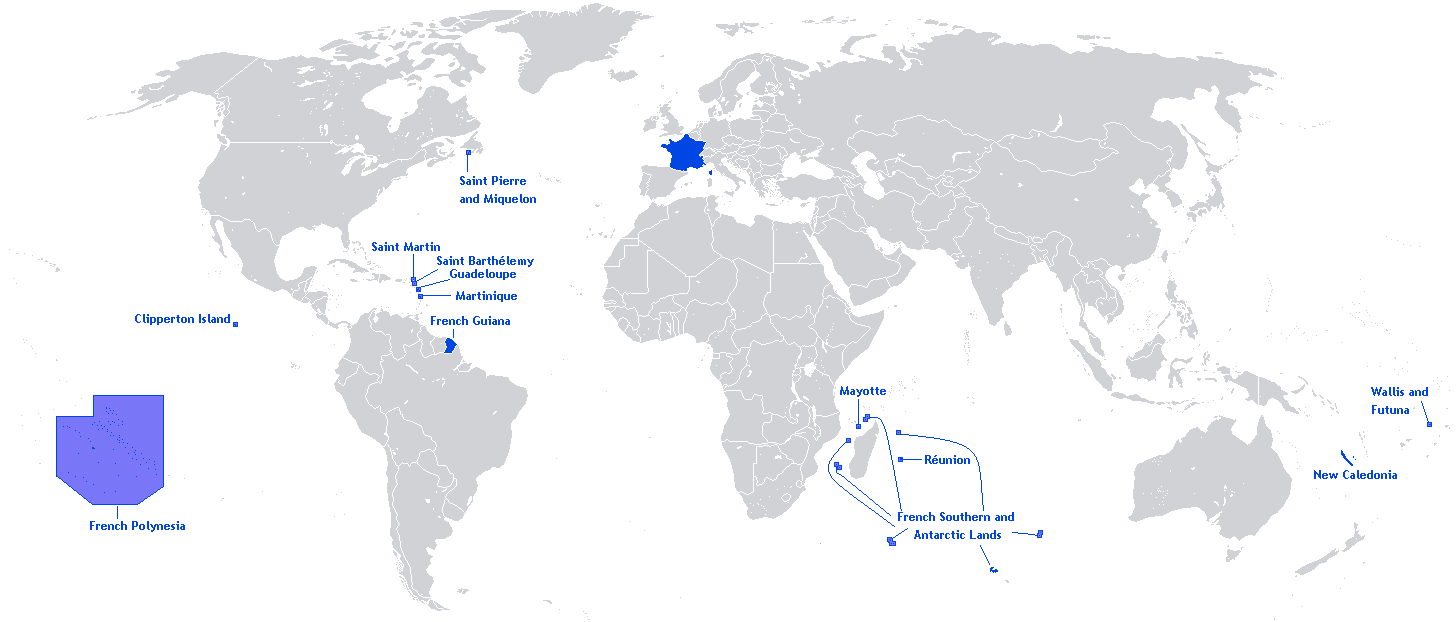

== See also ==
- List of current presidents of the regional councils of France and the Corsican Assembly
- Ranked list of French regions
- Administrative divisions of France
- List of French regions and overseas collectivities by GDP
- List of French regions by Human Development Index
- Flags of the regions of France
- ISO 3166-2:FR

General:

- Decentralisation in France
- Budget of France
- Regional councils of France
- Administrative divisions of France

Overseas

- Overseas France
  - Clipperton Island
  - Overseas collectivity
    - Overseas country (Outre-mer)
  - Overseas department and region
  - Overseas territory
  - Sui generis collectivity
