= List of Japanese prefectures by Human Development Index =

Human Branch Development in Japan

Map of Japanese regions and prefectures by HDI in 2017. Legend: > 0.930 0.900 – 0.930 0.890 – 0.900 < 0.890

This article presents a list of Japanese regions by Human Development Index as of 2021. This article also includes a list of Japanese prefectures by historical HDI in 1990, 1995 and 2000 further below.

== Japanese regions by HDI (2023) ==
This is a list regions of Japan by Human Development Index calculated using the new methodology.

Rank	Region	HDI (2023)
Very high human development
1	Southern Kantō, Koshin (Saitama, Chiba, Tokyo, Kanagawa, Yamanashi, Nagano)	0.951
2	Kansai (Shiga, Kyoto, Osaka, Hyōgo, Nara, Wakayama)	0.927
3	Tōkai (Gifu, Shizuoka, Aichi, Mie)	0.925
–	Japan	0.925
4	Chūgoku (Tottori, Shimane, Okayama, Hiroshima, Yamaguchi)	0.921
5	Northern Kantō (Ibaraki, Tochigi, Gunma)	0.913
6	Hokuriku (Niigata, Toyama, Ishikawa, Fukui)	0.907
7	Kyushu (Fukuoka, Saga, Nagasaki, Kumamoto, Ōita, Miyazaki, Kagoshima, Okinawa)	0.904
8	Shikoku (Tokushima, Kagawa, Ehime, Kōchi)	0.903
9	Hokkaido	0.898
10	Tōhoku (Aomori, Iwate, Miyagi, Akita, Yamagata, Fukushima)	0.893

== Japanese prefectures by past HDI using old methodology ==
This is a list of Japanese prefectures by Human Development Index calculated using the old methodology. This data was taken from the 2007 paper "Gross National Happiness and Material Welfare in Bhutan and Japan" (Tashi Choden, Takayoshi Kusago, Kokoro Shirai, Centre for Bhutan Studies, Osaka University). The 2022 HDI is roughly calculated by the editor, with errors approximately within ±0.015.

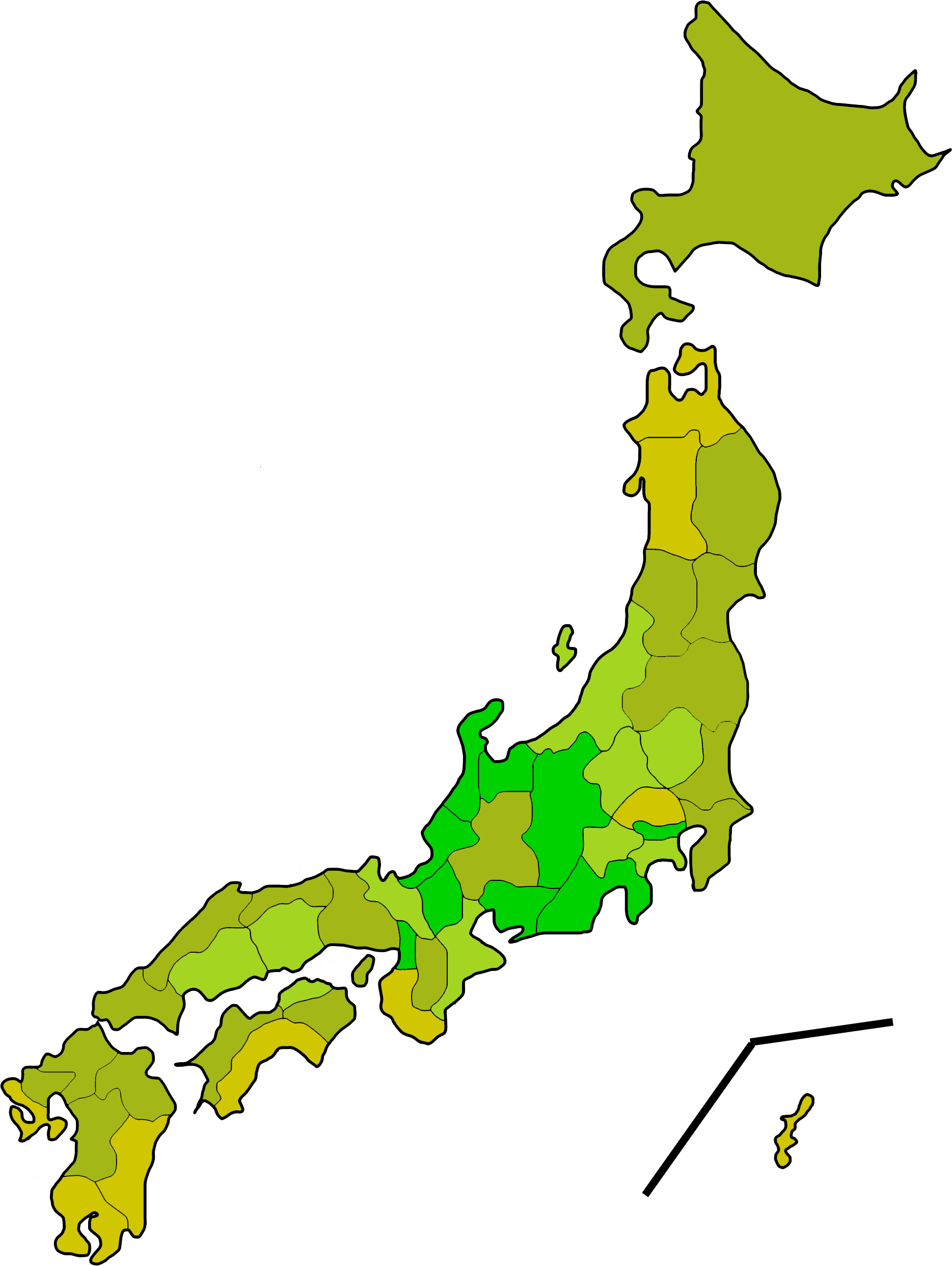
Map of the prefectures of Japan by HDI as of 2000.

Rank	Prefecture	HDI (1990)	HDI (1995)	HDI (2000)	HDI (2022)
1	Tokyo	0.9296	0.9448	0.9667	0.977
2	Aichi	0.9115	0.9265	0.9460	0.929
3	Shiga	0.9080	0.9229	0.9426	0.926
4	Shizuoka	0.9056	0.9204	0.9402	0.916
5	Fukui	0.9027	0.9204	0.9401	0.911
6	Toyama	0.9031	0.9205	0.9392	0.912
7	Osaka	0.9003	0.9177	0.9390	0.925
8	Nagano	0.8980	0.9148	0.9365	0.925
9	Ishikawa	0.8991	0.9163	0.9364	0.909
10	Hiroshima	0.9032	0.9170	0.9361	0.925
11	Kyoto	0.8952	0.9123	0.9333	0.929
12	Mie	0.8934	0.9123	0.9329	0.911
13	Kanagawa	0.8996	0.9119	0.93240	0.933
14	Yamanashi	0.8944	0.9094	0.9319	0.931
15	Okayama	0.8992	0.9152	0.9316	0.916
16	Kagawa	0.8945	0.9122	0.9304	0.907
17	Gunma	0.8957	0.9117	0.9303	0.904
18	Tochigi	0.8955	0.9107	0.9294	0.906
19	Niigata	0.8921	0.9095	0.9290	0.898
20	Hyōgo	0.8950	0.9086	0.9290	0.918
21	Ōita	0.8891	0.9076	0.9285	0.906
22	Gifu	0.8921	0.9070	0.9263	0.907
23	Hokkaidō	0.8863	0.9068	0.9260	0.893
24	Ibaraki	0.8928	0.9080	0.9259	0.911
25	Yamaguchi	0.8924	0.9084	0.9258	0.912
26	Miyagi	0.8926	0.9071	0.9247	0.903
27	Fukushima	0.8880	0.9044	0.9241	0.895
28	Tottori	0.8887	0.9045	0.9239	0.900
29	Shimane	0.8858	0.9021	0.9231	0.902
30	Fukuoka	0.8896	0.9061	0.9228	0.907
31	Kumamoto	0.8872	0.9045	0.9225	0.900
32	Ehime	0.8862	0.9047	0.9221	0.896
33	Chiba	0.8868	0.9019	0.9219	0.915
34	Yamagata	0.8855	0.9014	0.9216	0.891
35	Saga	0.8810	0.9021	0.9189	0.896
36	Iwate	0.8792	0.8998	0.9186	0.888
37	Tokushima	0.8831	0.9005	0.9182	0.906
38	Nara	0.8794	0.8944	0.9169	0.904
39	Saitama	0.8811	0.8956	0.9166	0.915
40	Kōchi	0.8781	0.8964	0.9156	0.889
41	Wakayama	0.8770	0.8957	0.9155	0.898
42	Miyazaki	0.8780	0.8959	0.9148	0.888
43	Akita	0.8777	0.8951	0.9142	0.888
44	Nagasaki	0.8749	0.8949	0.9127	0.890
45	Kagoshima	0.8762	0.8938	0.9127	0.892
46	Okinawa	0.8810	0.8940	0.9111	0.888
47	Aomori	0.8698	0.8877	0.9065	0.876
