= List of French regions by Human Development Index =

Map of French regions and overseas territories by HDI in 2017. Legend: > 0.900 0.880 - 0.900 0.860 - 0.880 0.800 - 0.860 < 0.800

This is a list of French regions and overseas territories by Human Development Index as of 2023. The regions since 2016 that the pre-2016 regions correspond to or are part of are shown alongside.

Rank	Pre-2016 region	Region since 2016	HDI (2023)
Very high human development
1	Île-de-France		0.960
2	Rhône-Alpes	Auvergne-Rhône-Alpes	0.930
3	Provence-Alpes-Côte d'Azur		0.921
–	France		0.920
4	Midi-Pyrénées	Occitanie	0.920
5	Aquitaine	Nouvelle-Aquitaine	0.914
6	Pays de la Loire		0.912
7	Alsace	Grand Est	0.910
8	Brittany		0.909
9	Languedoc-Roussillon	Occitanie	0.905
10	Upper Normandy	Normandy	0.902
11	Poitou-Charentes	Nouvelle-Aquitaine	0.901
12	Auvergne	Auvergne-Rhône-Alpes	0.899
13	Nord-Pas-de-Calais	Hauts-de-France	0.895
14	Franche-Comté	Bourgogne-Franche-Comté	0.890
15	Burgundy	Bourgogne-Franche-Comté	0.889
15	Limousin	Nouvelle-Aquitaine	0.889
17	Centre-Val de Loire		0.888
18	Champagne-Ardenne	Grand Est	0.885
19	Lower Normandy	Normandy	0.884
20	Lorraine	Grand Est	0.881
21	Picardy	Hauts-de-France	0.877
22	Corsica		0.875
23	Guadeloupe		0.872
24	Martinique		0.860
25	Réunion		0.856
26	French Guiana		0.820
27	Mayotte		0.800
