= List of governorates of Syria by Human Development Index =

This is a list of the 14 Governorates of Syria by Human Development Index as of 2025 with data for the year 2023.

Rank	Governorate	HDI (2023)
Medium human development
1	Suwayda	0.611
2	Latakia	0.606
3	Damascus	0.605
4	Tartus	0.601
5	Homs	0.585
6	Rif Dimashq	0.579
7	Daraa	0.573
8	Hama	0.570
–	Syria	0.564
9	Quneitra	0.551
Low human development
10	Deir ez-Zor	0.537
11	Idlib	0.536
12	Aleppo	0.534
13	Hasakah	0.513
14	Raqqa	0.505

== See also ==
- List of countries by Human Development Index
