= List of Chilean Regions by Human Development Index =

Chilean Regions By Human Development Index

HDI of Chilean regions (2023) 0.900 – 0.908 0.880 – 0.899 0.860 – 0.879 0.840 – 0.859 0.820 – 0.839 0.800 – 0.819

The Human Development Index (HDI) is an indicator developed by the UNDP that seeks to quantify a country's quality of life. It combines three dimensions:

- Standard of living: Measured by Gross National Income (GNI) per capita in 2021 dollars, adjusted for purchasing power parity (PPP). This indicator reflects a country's total economic activity, plus income received from abroad (such as remittances or investments), minus capital outflows to other countries. In other words, it represents the average amount of economic resources available per person, taking into account the local cost of living.
- Education: Measured by years of schooling (both expected and mean).
- Health: Measured by life expectancy at birth.

The HDI ranges from 0 to 1, where 1 represents the highest quality of life and 0 the absolute absence of it. Countries or regions with an HDI of 0.800 or higher are classified as having "very high human development".

== Tables of the Human Development Index of Chilean Regions ==
Chile leads Latin America with the highest HDI. All its regions reach the category of very high human development. According to the latest data, several Chilean subdivisions rank as the most advanced in the entire region.

=== Their HDI and its components ===
Region	HDI (2023)	Life expectancy	Expected years of schooling	Mean years of schooling	GNI per capita (PPP 2021 dollars)
Santiago Metropolitan Region	0.908	81.38	18.00	12.24	32,533
Arica y Parinacota	0.905	81.89	18.00	12.39	28,001
Tarapacá	0.905	81.89	18.00	12.39	28,001
Antofagasta	0.898	79.19	18.00	12.58	30,946
(Valparaíso Region) Valparaíso	0.894	81.47	17.61	11.75	29,437
(Magallanes y la Antártica Chilena Region) Magallanes and the Chilean Antarctica	0.891	80.25	17.59	11.74	31,257
(Atacama Region) Atacama	0.882	82.95	16.77	11.20	26,903
Chile	0.878	81.17	16.91	11.29	28,001
(Coquimbo Region) Coquimbo	0.857	81.96	15.90	10.62	24,101
Biobío Region	0.852	81.44	15.65	10.45	25,336
Ñuble Region	0.852	81.44	15.65	10.45	25,336
O'Higgins	0.847	81.61	15.19	10.14	26,370
Aysén	0.833	80.93	15.01	10.02	23,156
Los Lagos Region	0.821	81.01	14.41	9.62	22,471
Los Ríos Region	0.821	81.01	14.41	9.62	22,471
Maule Region	0.816	79.88	14.25	9.51	23,861
Araucanía	0.812	80.05	14.38	9.59	20,682

=== Comparing the regions with countries ===
We can compare the quality of life of the regions with entire countries with the same HDI:

Rank	Region	HDI (2023)	Country for Comparison
Very High Human Development
1	Santiago Metropolitan Region	0.908	Greece
2	Tarapacá	0.905	Estonia
2	Arica y Parinacota	0.905	Estonia
4	Antofagasta	0.898	Bahrain
5	Valparaíso Region	0.894	Lithuania
6	Magallanes	0.891	Portugal
7	Atacama	0.882	Slovakia
–	Chile (average)	0.878	–
8	Coquimbo	0.857	Oman
9	Biobío Region	0.852	Kuwait
9	Ñuble Region	0.852	Kuwait
11	O'Higgins	0.847	Seychelles
12	Aysén	0.833	Serbia
13	Los Lagos Region	0.821	Bahamas
13	Los Ríos Region	0.821	Bahamas
15	Maule Region	0.816	North Macedonia
16	Araucanía	0.812	Armenia

=== HDI of the regions in the 1990-2023 period ===
Region	Human Development Index (2023)								
Region	2023	2022	2021	2020	2019	2015	2010	2000	1990
Chile	0.878	0.869	0.865	0.856	0.867	0.855	0.823	0.771	0.718
Santiago Metropolitan Region	0.908	0.898	0.895	0.888	0.898	0.887	0.854	0.800	0.745
Arica y Parinacota	0.905	0.895	0.892	0.886	0.895	0.885	0.853	0.798	0.743
Tarapacá	0.905	0.895	0.892	0.886	0.895	0.885	0.853	0.798	0.743
Antofagasta	0.898	0.889	0.886	0.881	0.889	0.879	0.849	0.795	0.740
(Valparaíso Region) Valparaíso	0.894	0.885	0.881	0.871	0.882	0.870	0.838	0.785	0.731
(Magallanes y la Antártica Chilena Region) Magallanes and the Chilean Antarctica	0.891	0.881	0.877	0.868	0.879	0.867	0.835	0.782	0.728
(Atacama Region) Atacama	0.882	0.873	0.869	0.860	0.871	0.859	0.827	0.774	0.721
(Coquimbo Region) Coquimbo	0.857	0.847	0.843	0.834	0.845	0.833	0.802	0.751	0.699
Biobío Region	0.852	0.843	0.839	0.830	0.841	0.829	0.798	0.747	0.696
Ñuble Region	0.852	0.843	0.839	0.830	0.841	0.829	0.798	0.747	0.696
O'Higgins	0.847	0.837	0.833	0.825	0.835	0.824	0.793	0.743	0.691
Aysén	0.833	0.824	0.820	0.812	0.822	0.811	0.781	0.731	0.680
Los Lagos Region	0.821	0.812	0.808	0.799	0.810	0.799	0.769	0.720	0.670
Los Ríos Region	0.821	0.812	0.808	0.799	0.810	0.799	0.769	0.720	0.670
Maule Region	0.816	0.807	0.803	0.794	0.805	0.794	0.764	0.715	0.666
Araucanía	0.812	0.803	0.799	0.791	0.801	0.790	0.760	0.712	0.662

== See also ==
- Human Development Index
- Regions of Chile
- List of subnational entities with the highest and lowest Human Development Index
- Ranked lists of Chilean regions
