= List of regions of Bosnia and Herzegovina by Human Development Index =

Comparison of Human Development Index of Bosnia and Herzegovina's regions

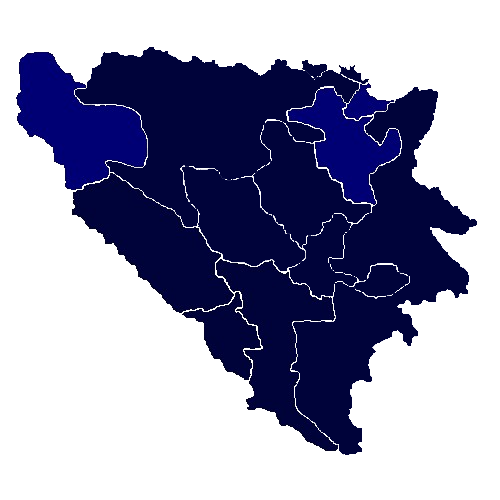
Map of the regions of Bosnia and Herzegovina by HDI in 2023. > 0.800 0.799 - 0.700

This is a list of regions of Bosnia and Herzegovina by Human Development Index as of 2023.

== List ==
Rank	Region	HDI (2023)
Very high human development
1	West Herzegovina Canton	0.827
1	Herzegovina-Neretva Canton	0.827
1	Canton 10	0.827
2	Sarajevo Canton	0.806
2	Zenica-Doboj Canton	0.806
2	Central Bosnia Canton	0.806
2	Bosnian-Podrinje Canton Goražde	0.806
–	Bosnia and Herzegovina (average)	0.804
3	Posavina Canton	0.801
3	Republika Srpska	0.801
High human development
4	Una-Sana Canton	0.798
5	Tuzla Canton	0.797
5	Brčko District	0.797
