= Governorates of Syria =

Subdivisions of Syria

Governorates of Syria محافظات سوريا (Arabic)
- Category: Unitary state
- Location: Syria
- Number: 14 governorates
- Populations: 90,000 (Quneitra) – 4,868,000 (Aleppo)
- Areas: 110 km^{2} (41 sq mi) (Damascus) – 42,220 km^{2} (16,302 sq mi) (Homs)
- Government: Provincial councils and their executive bureaus
- Subdivisions: District

Syria is a unitary state, but for administrative purposes, it is divided into fourteen governorates, also called provinces or counties in English (Arabic: مُحَافَظَة [muˈħaːfaðˤa]; pl. مُحَافَظَات muḥāfaẓāt [muħafaˈðˤaːt]). The governorates are divided into sixty-five districts (Arabic: مناطق, romanized: manāṭiq, singular minṭaqah), which are further divided into subdistricts (Arabic: نَاحِيَة [ˈnaːħijah], plural نَوَاحِي, nawāḥī [naˈwaːħiː]). The nawāḥī contain villages, which are the smallest administrative units.

Each governorate is headed by a governor, appointed by the president, subject to cabinet approval. The governor is responsible for administration, health, social services, education, tourism, public works, transportation, domestic trade, agriculture, industry, civil defense, and maintenance of law and order in the governorate. The minister of each local administration works closely with each governor to coordinate and supervise local development projects. The governor is assisted by a provincial council, all of whose members are popularly elected for four-year terms. In addition, each council elects from among its members an executive bureau which administers the day to day issues between provincial council sessions. Each executive officer is charged with specific functions.

Districts and subdistricts are administered by officials appointed by the governor. These officials work on local matters with elected district councils and serve as intermediaries between the central government and traditional local leaders, such as village chiefs, clan leaders, and councils of elders.

== History ==
1941

1952

1958

1965

Current division

Development of the administrative divisions of Syria until it reached 14 governorates

Upon achieving independence from the French Mandate on April 17, 1946, Syria retained much of the administrative framework inherited from the mandate period and organized its territory into nine top-level districts (later governorates): Aleppo, Damascus, Euphrates (Al-Furat), Hama, Hauran, Homs, Jabal al-Druze, Al Jazira, and Latakia.

During the 1950s, several governorates names were standardized: Hauran became Daraa, Jabal al-Druze was renamed Sweida, and Al-Jazira became Al-Hasakah.

In the early 1960s, further territorial adjustments were introduced: the Euphrates Governorate was divided into Al-Rashid and Deir ez-Zor, while Idlib Governorate was separated from Aleppo. In 1962, Damascus was reorganized into two administrative units, Damascus Governorate and the City of Damascus (Madīnat Dimashq).

In 1970, Al-Rashid Governorate was renamed Raqqa.

On August 27, 1964, Quneitra Governorate was created from parts of Damascus Governorate. Additional changes occurred in the 1970s, when Tartus Governorate was separated from the Latakia Governorate. In 1987, the City of Damascus was formally designated as an independent governorate, and Damascus Governorate was reorganized as Rif Dimashq Governorate, the rural governorate surrounding the capital, completing the basic structure of Syria's contemporary administrative system.

== List ==
Governorate name	Area (km^{2})	Population (2018)	Population density (km^{2})	Districts	Photo	Emblem	Location
Aleppo Governorate (محافظة حلب)	18,482	4,600,166	248.90	8			
Raqqa Governorate (محافظة الرقة)	19,616	919,000	46.85	3			
Suwayda Governorate (محافظة السويداء)	5,550	500,000	90.09	3			
Damascus Governorate (محافظة دمشق)	106	2,211,042	20858.89	1			
Daraa Governorate (محافظة درعا)	3,730	998,000	267.56	3		N/A	
Deir ez-Zor Governorate (محافظة دير الزور)	33,060	1,200,500	36.31	3			
Hama Governorate (محافظة حماة)	8,883	1,593,000	179.32	5			
Hasakah Governorate (محافظة الحسكة)	23,334	1,272,702	54.53	4		N/A	
Homs Governorate (محافظة حمص)	42,223	1,762,500	41.74	6			
Idlib Governorate (محافظة إدلب)	6,097	1,464,000	240.13	5			
Latakia Governorate (محافظة اللاذقية)	2,297	1,278,486	556.58	4			
Quneitra Governorate (محافظة القنيطرة)	1,861	87,000	46.74	2		N/A	
Rif Dimashq Governorate (محافظة ريف دمشق)	18,032	2,831,738	157.04	9			
Tartus Governorate (محافظة طرطوس)	1,892	785,000	414.89	5		v	

== See also ==
- List of governorates of Syria by Human Development Index
- Districts of Syria
- ISO 3166-2:SY
- List of cities in Syria
- List of towns and villages in Syria
