= List of regions of New Zealand by Human Development Index =

Map of regions of New Zealand by HDI in 2018 Legend: > 0.932 0.920 - 0.932 0.910 - 0.920 0.900 - 0.910 < 0.900 No data

This is a list of the regions of New Zealand by Human Development Index as of 2025 with data for the year 2023. The three most populated regions of New Zealand have the highest HDI, although the position of other regions has been variable across recent releases of the index.

Rank	Region	2023 HDI
Very High Human Development
1	Wellington	0.968
2	Auckland	0.967
3	Canterbury	0.941
4	Taranaki	0.94
–	New Zealand (average HDI)	0.938
5	Marlborough	0.937
6	Otago	0.935
7	Tasman-Nelson	0.931
7	Waikato	0.931
9	Bay of Plenty	0.93
10	Southland	0.928
11	Hawke's Bay	0.92
12	West Coast	0.918
13	Manawatū-Whanganui	0.914
14	Northland	0.899
15	Gisborne	0.896
