= Education Index =

Component of the Human Development Index

World map indicating Education Index over time (1990‍–‍2019)

The Education Index is a component of the Human Development Index (HDI) published every year by the United Nations Development Programme. Alongside the economical indicators (GDP) and Life Expectancy Index, it helps measure the educational attainment. GNI (PPP) per capita and life expectancy are also used with the education index to get the HDI of each country.

Since 2010, the education index has been measured by combining average adult years of schooling with expected years of schooling for students under the age of 25, each receiving 50% weighting. Before 2010, the education index was measured by the adult literacy rate (with two-thirds weighting) and the combined primary, secondary, and tertiary gross enrollment ratio (with one-third weighting).

Education is a major component of well-being and is used in the measure of economic development and quality of life, which is a key factor determining whether a country is a developed, developing, or underdeveloped country.

== Calculations ==
A country's education index is calculated with the following formula:

$EI= \frac{{\frac{{EYS}}{18} + \frac{{MYS}}{15}}} {2}$

$\textrm{EYS}$, expected years of schooling, is a calculation of the number of years a student is expected to attend school, or university. In most countries, a master's degree represents the highest obtainable level of education, and obtaining one reflects 18 years of education. This means that if every student in a country enrolled in a master's degree that country's EYS index would be 1.0.

$\textrm{MYS}$, mean years of schooling, is a calculation of the average number of years of education a student aged 25 or over has actually received. It's based on education attainment levels of the population converted into years of schooling based on theoretical duration of each level of education attended. 15 years is the projected maximum of this indicator for 2025 and is thus used as the maximum for the index. This means that a country whose citizens all attained 15 years of education by the age of 25, would have an MYS index of 1.0.

== Data ==
Worldwide education indexes are provided by the UNDP's Human Development Report derived from the UNESCO Institute for Statistics and other sources.

Country	2023	2019	2018	2017	2016	2015	2014	2013	2012	2011	2010	2009	2008	2007	2006	2005	2004	2003	2002	2001	2000	1999	1998	1997	1996	1995	1994	1993	1992	1991	1990
Afghanistan	0.38	0.414	0.413	0.408	0.406	0.405	0.403	0.398	0.39	0.374	0.372	0.352	0.342	0.336	0.324	0.312	0.302	0.271	0.259	0.247	0.235	0.224	0.213	0.202	0.19	0.179	0.168	0.156	0.145	0.133	0.122
Albania	0.74	0.746	0.743	0.747	0.745	0.753	0.758	0.749	0.739	0.714	0.671	0.65	0.644	0.64	0.628	0.621	0.605	0.604	0.596	0.588	0.586	0.584	0.579	0.569	0.557	0.55	0.528	0.542	0.557	0.588	0.583
Algeria	0.68	0.672	0.668	0.665	0.66	0.659	0.652	0.639	0.639	0.644	0.626	0.608	0.588	0.588	0.577	0.57	0.557	0.542	0.529	0.513	0.5	0.487	0.473	0.458	0.443	0.431	0.424	0.414	0.405	0.395	0.385
Andorra	0.79	0.72	0.72	0.713	0.722	0.718	0.725	0.714	0.724	0.671	0.67	0.668	0.667	0.652	0.651	0.631	0.65	0.642	0.636	0.63	0.63										
Angola	0.54	0.5	0.5	0.498	0.587	0.472	0.46	0.447	0.435	0.423	0.398	0.404	0.39	0.376	0.362	0.348	0.336	0.324	0.312	0.3	0.288	0.276									
Antigua and Barbuda	0.82	0.665	0.656	0.655	0.654	0.654	0.652	0.657	0.656	0.651	0.667	0.672	0.674	0.676	0.675	0.673															
Argentina	0.90	0.855	0.842	0.842	0.834	0.832	0.826	0.822	0.822	0.824	0.818	0.81	0.801	0.796	0.795	0.751	0.76	0.761	0.762	0.756	0.736	0.715	0.681	0.67	0.659	0.648	0.639	0.636	0.634	0.632	0.628
Armenia	0.78	0.74	0.74	0.739	0.744	0.75	0.746	0.743	0.736	0.737	0.734	0.729	0.712	0.717	0.696	0.679	0.668	0.662	0.66	0.66	0.671	0.674	0.666	0.646	0.633	0.631	0.64	0.647	0.64	0.64	0.637
Australia	1.01	0.924	0.923	0.923	0.919	0.918	0.908	0.906	0.928	0.922	0.919	0.916	0.914	0.879	0.876	0.873	0.892	0.893	0.895	0.896	0.895	0.895	0.895	0.895	0.895	0.894	0.875	0.875	0.874	0.874	0.873
Austria	0.87	0.865	0.866	0.865	0.862	0.861	0.854	0.833	0.841	0.838	0.837	0.819	0.809	0.806	0.759	0.749	0.74	0.728	0.721	0.754	0.731	0.727	0.72	0.715	0.711	0.709	0.704	0.699	0.692	0.682	0.675
Azerbaijan	0.73	0.711	0.711	0.713	0.708	0.681	0.674	0.668	0.666	0.663	0.659	0.674	0.662	0.662	0.68	0.652	0.666	0.66	0.653	0.647	0.64	0.633	0.625	0.616	0.614	0.618					
Bahamas	0.76	0.74	0.737	0.736	0.735	0.731	0.727	0.728	0.729	0.73	0.731	0.725	0.72	0.717	0.717	0.71	0.708	0.706	0.704	0.702	0.7										
Bahrain	0.81	0.769	0.765	0.77	0.768	0.755	0.685	0.674	0.664	0.664	0.654	0.651	0.647	0.644	0.64	0.637	0.641	0.646	0.646	0.645	0.643	0.635	0.632	0.628	0.624	0.619	0.609	0.599	0.586	0.586	0.574
Bangladesh	0.57	0.529	0.524	0.513	0.496	0.479	0.451	0.457	0.456	0.446	0.432	0.409	0.391	0.395	0.391	0.385	0.378	0.37	0.362	0.355	0.344	0.334	0.324	0.313	0.303	0.292	0.284	0.276	0.268	0.26	0.251
Barbados	0.79	0.782	0.773	0.773	0.777	0.777	0.777	0.777	0.776	0.755	0.742	0.751	0.742	0.732	0.725	0.718	0.711	0.704	0.697	0.69	0.69	0.678	0.66	0.669	0.665	0.66	0.653	0.646	0.639	0.632	0.625
Belarus	0.79	0.838	0.843	0.842	0.839	0.837	0.838	0.839	0.833	0.829	0.828	0.826	0.804	0.774	0.745	0.716	0.706	0.696	0.687	0.677	0.668	0.658	0.649	0.648	0.643	0.63					
Belgium	0.95	0.902	0.9	0.9	0.893	0.89	0.883	0.88	0.874	0.873	0.871	0.87	0.865	0.871	0.869	0.856	0.849	0.846	0.842	0.838	0.833	0.825	0.827	0.82	0.815	0.803	0.79	0.779	0.745	0.708	0.705
Belize	0.63	0.695	0.691	0.691	0.696	0.674	0.669	0.665	0.665	0.65	0.663	0.635	0.633	0.626	0.619	0.596	0.608	0.596	0.583	0.57	0.563	0.555	0.548	0.54	0.533	0.526	0.519	0.512	0.505	0.498	0.495
Benin	0.40	0.478	0.476	0.472	0.472	0.473	0.46	0.454	0.433	0.411	0.4	0.389	0.377	0.366	0.355	0.344	0.333	0.321	0.31	0.294	0.273	0.262	0.254	0.248	0.241	0.235	0.228	0.222	0.215	0.208	0.201
Bhutan	0.56	0.496	0.494	0.491	0.478	0.465	0.452	0.443	0.421	0.401	0.388	0.372	0.361	0.35	0.337	0.335															
Bolivia (Plurinational State of)	0.77	0.695	0.69	0.686	0.67	0.666	0.66	0.656	0.644	0.642	0.642	0.639	0.636	0.624	0.635	0.631	0.637	0.644	0.641	0.631	0.63	0.616	0.594	0.574	0.581	0.574	0.565	0.555	0.546	0.537	0.528
Bosnia and Herzegovina	0.73	0.711	0.71	0.708	0.709	0.688	0.687	0.683	0.672	0.626	0.608	0.625	0.623	0.615	0.607	0.599	0.59	0.582	0.574	0.565	0.557										
Botswana	0.67	0.676	0.666	0.664	0.659	0.657	0.653	0.649	0.645	0.641	0.636	0.632	0.628	0.625	0.622	0.613	0.608	0.603	0.596	0.597	0.589	0.577	0.559	0.542	0.531	0.519	0.499	0.493	0.486	0.478	0.461
Brazil	0.72	0.694	0.689	0.689	0.684	0.677	0.674	0.668	0.628	0.622	0.619	0.61	0.608	0.588	0.589	0.593	0.593	0.595	0.61	0.597	0.584	0.572	0.559	0.547	0.535	0.523	0.511	0.499	0.487	0.475	0.463
Brunei Darussalam	0.69	0.702	0.703	0.704	0.707	0.705	0.71	0.711	0.709	0.692	0.683	0.683	0.677	0.677	0.678	0.674	0.667	0.656	0.646	0.642	0.643	0.642	0.632	0.633	0.629	0.626	0.62	0.613	0.604	0.596	0.588
Bulgaria	0.81	0.779	0.779	0.785	0.793	0.794	0.793	0.785	0.77	0.765	0.761	0.752	0.747	0.743	0.727	0.715	0.712	0.705	0.691	0.69	0.677	0.676	0.671	0.667	0.663	0.647	0.635	0.635	0.635	0.637	0.632
Burkina Faso	0.32	0.312	0.3	0.298	0.286	0.277	0.264	0.261	0.253	0.245	0.232	0.22	0.208	0.194	0.181	0.173	0.162	0.151	0.147	0.142	0.139										
Burundi	0.39	0.417	0.412	0.422	0.429	0.424	0.419	0.408	0.399	0.392	0.376	0.359	0.323	0.301	0.28	0.24	0.228	0.214	0.199	0.186	0.187	0.183	0.183	0.182	0.182	0.181	0.181	0.181	0.172	0.176	0.171
Cabo Verde	0.52	0.562	0.566	0.565	0.564	0.568	0.567	0.549	0.543	0.532	0.521	0.515	0.503	0.49	0.487	0.463	0.455	0.454	0.451	0.435	0.436										
Cambodia	0.48	0.484	0.476	0.476	0.472	0.468	0.465	0.46	0.455	0.449	0.444	0.428	0.425	0.424	0.409	0.4	0.392	0.382	0.369	0.337	0.319	0.305	0.31	0.305	0.301	0.297	0.292	0.288	0.284	0.28	0.276
Cameroon	0.52	0.547	0.546	0.543	0.54	0.536	0.522	0.517	0.501	0.478	0.461	0.448	0.434	0.422	0.4	0.405	0.406	0.404	0.4	0.401	0.364	0.353	0.35	0.347	0.346	0.345	0.344	0.344	0.343	0.342	0.339
Canada	0.91	0.894	0.893	0.889	0.884	0.88	0.874	0.864	0.849	0.842	0.842	0.838	0.836	0.833	0.85	0.847	0.839	0.83	0.822	0.814	0.805	0.805	0.805	0.816	0.825	0.822	0.82	0.815	0.824	0.818	0.806
Central African Republic	0.34	0.353	0.353	0.352	0.345	0.339	0.334	0.329	0.322	0.317	0.307	0.296	0.294	0.288	0.282	0.276	0.269	0.262	0.256	0.249	0.243	0.236	0.229	0.222	0.215	0.208	0.202	0.196	0.189	0.207	0.214
Chad	0.31	0.288	0.29	0.288	0.278	0.283	0.295	0.286	0.278	0.269	0.249	0.246	0.232	0.222	0.212	0.202	0.203	0.2	0.196	0.188	0.18										
Chile	0.85	0.81	0.805	0.804	0.799	0.791	0.783	0.758	0.751	0.744	0.722	0.784	0.76	0.745	0.719	0.722	0.715	0.698	0.685	0.684	0.661	0.653	0.637	0.64	0.633	0.627	0.62	0.613	0.64	0.638	0.626
China	0.70	0.862	0.859	0.787	0.757	0.732	0.703	0.677	0.647	0.63	0.602	0.586	0.577	0.565	0.551	0.535	0.522	0.514	0.5	0.488	0.481	0.473	0.465	0.457	0.45	0.442	0.427	0.427	0.42	0.411	0.405
Colombia	0.70	0.682	0.678	0.678	0.673	0.664	0.664	0.644	0.644	0.638	0.634	0.617	0.614	0.602	0.577	0.565	0.56	0.533	0.54	0.537	0.534	0.529	0.526	0.512	0.498	0.48	0.474	0.466	0.457	0.438	0.433
Comoros	0.57	0.482	0.479	0.476	0.474	0.471	0.47	0.468	0.465	0.457	0.434	0.422	0.411	0.399	0.388	0.376	0.364	0.362	0.348	0.338	0.328										
Congo	0.55	0.543	0.539	0.539	0.539	0.533	0.522	0.511	0.5	0.5	0.5	0.492	0.484	0.476	0.468	0.46	0.453	0.445	0.449	0.452	0.454	0.455	0.456	0.458	0.459	0.46	0.459	0.458	0.457	0.455	0.455
Congo (Democratic Republic of the)	0.55	0.496	0.494	0.493	0.486	0.478	0.484	0.466	0.453	0.452	0.453	0.419	0.408	0.381	0.362	0.352	0.343	0.333	0.324	0.315	0.305	0.3	0.295	0.29	0.285	0.28	0.277	0.273	0.27	0.266	0.263
Costa Rica	0.75	0.726	0.724	0.717	0.714	0.71	0.712	0.694	0.686	0.679	0.65	0.65	0.642	0.628	0.619	0.613	0.609	0.605	0.601	0.597	0.593	0.584	0.576	0.567	0.559	0.55	0.542	0.534	0.526	0.515	0.505
Croatia	0.86	0.805	0.803	0.802	0.802	0.802	0.797	0.785	0.777	0.772	0.753	0.746	0.742	0.733	0.717	0.71	0.702	0.693	0.685	0.677	0.656	0.639	0.616	0.592	0.575	0.558	0.553	0.529	0.519	0.508	0.498
Cuba	0.74	0.79	0.783	0.776	0.768	0.767	0.76	0.76	0.773	0.813	0.824	0.841	0.838	0.815	0.78	0.736	0.721	0.693	0.671	0.67	0.663	0.655	0.647	0.64	0.636	0.621	0.619	0.633	0.627	0.626	0.624
Cyprus	0.87	0.827	0.827	0.813	0.808	0.792	0.793	0.788	0.777	0.771	0.767	0.781	0.768	0.755	0.74	0.729	0.724	0.718	0.701	0.684	0.676	0.674	0.671	0.668	0.662	0.655	0.648	0.644	0.556	0.553	0.546
Czechia	0.90	0.89	0.89	0.89	0.889	0.891	0.893	0.882	0.859	0.863	0.858	0.85	0.836	0.83	0.821	0.809	0.794	0.792	0.777	0.762	0.741	0.719	0.697	0.699	0.685	0.657	0.642	0.626	0.612	0.609	0.609
Côte d'Ivoire	0.48	0.453	0.45	0.436	0.417	0.404	0.389	0.399	0.393	0.386	0.376	0.368	0.36	0.352	0.344	0.336	0.329	0.321	0.313	0.305	0.297	0.287	0.273	0.273	0.266	0.259	0.253	0.248	0.243	0.238	0.233
Denmark	0.95	0.92	0.921	0.919	0.917	0.918	0.927	0.926	0.925	0.924	0.895	0.891	0.897	0.884	0.89	0.895	0.889	0.885	0.858	0.842	0.809	0.809	0.784	0.774	0.763	0.751	0.739	0.723	0.708	0.7	0.69
Djibouti	0.31	0.325	0.322	0.316	0.316	0.315	0.314	0.311	0.308	0.3	0.296	0.284	0.278	0.267	0.253	0.245	0.232	0.222	0.211	0.203	0.188	0.186	0.182	0.178	0.173	0.171					
Dominica	0.73	0.632	0.63	0.629	0.63	0.632	0.634	0.635	0.637	0.639	0.639	0.613	0.612	0.61	0.608	0.606	0.604	0.602	0.599	0.597	0.595										
Dominican Republic	0.65	0.666	0.66	0.657	0.655	0.652	0.641	0.619	0.616	0.611	0.606	0.601	0.598	0.595	0.59	0.585	0.579	0.573	0.566	0.56	0.554	0.548	0.542	0.537	0.531	0.525	0.517	0.509	0.501	0.493	0.485
Ecuador	0.71	0.702	0.709	0.707	0.704	0.717	0.695	0.697	0.695	0.651	0.646	0.633	0.629	0.622	0.6	0.598	0.594	0.59	0.586	0.581	0.577	0.575	0.572	0.57	0.567	0.565	0.561	0.557	0.553	0.549	0.551
Egypt	0.70	0.618	0.609	0.605	0.604	0.597	0.586	0.583	0.571	0.556	0.551	0.54	0.54	0.529	0.518	0.507	0.497	0.487	0.484	0.476	0.468	0.461	0.438	0.442	0.433	0.424	0.416	0.408	0.4	0.392	0.389
El Salvador	0.55	0.555	0.553	0.562	0.566	0.562	0.568	0.576	0.577	0.57	0.586	0.56	0.557	0.555	0.561	0.551	0.539	0.528	0.514	0.502	0.493	0.479	0.478	0.463	0.447	0.432	0.42	0.408	0.396	0.384	0.382
Equatorial Guinea	0.62	0.467	0.441	0.441	0.44	0.44	0.439	0.439	0.439	0.438	0.438	0.436	0.434	0.433	0.431	0.429	0.421	0.416	0.411	0.407	0.402										
Eritrea	0.37	0.269	0.269	0.269	0.279	0.279	0.29	0.272	0.271	0.269	0.279	0.282	0.27	0.271	0.272	0.272															
Estonia	0.90	0.882	0.882	0.881	0.882	0.878	0.87	0.875	0.877	0.876	0.872	0.863	0.858	0.856	0.852	0.85	0.841	0.835	0.83	0.822	0.808	0.783	0.768	0.747	0.726	0.707	0.69	0.678	0.683	0.676	0.675
Kingdom of Eswatini	0.71	0.557	0.553	0.545	0.541	0.537	0.532	0.522	0.515	0.508	0.501	0.491	0.481	0.47	0.459	0.426	0.403	0.376	0.373	0.38	0.388	0.395	0.397	0.401	0.406	0.408	0.41	0.409	0.41	0.412	0.407
Ethiopia	0.34	0.341	0.335	0.332	0.327	0.327	0.323	0.32	0.314	0.312	0.305	0.3	0.298	0.279	0.264	0.247	0.221	0.208	0.2	0.187	0.169										
Fiji	0.73	0.764	0.764	0.762	0.758	0.762	0.753	0.743	0.738	0.731	0.724	0.723	0.715	0.714	0.704	0.697	0.695	0.684	0.685	0.686	0.686	0.686	0.685	0.684	0.683	0.682	0.67	0.658	0.647	0.635	0.616
Finland	0.98	0.927	0.927	0.926	0.924	0.923	0.921	0.925	0.904	0.901	0.897	0.892	0.897	0.897	0.896	0.895	0.89	0.82	0.817	0.814	0.803	0.787	0.775	0.762	0.752	0.741	0.731	0.714	0.703	0.68	0.666
France	0.84	0.817	0.812	0.811	0.809	0.812	0.811	0.801	0.792	0.787	0.783	0.778	0.776	0.775	0.774	0.769	0.75	0.748	0.742	0.744	0.743	0.755	0.747	0.742	0.737	0.728	0.715	0.682	0.669	0.653	0.631
Gabon	0.67	0.65	0.639	0.633	0.628	0.623	0.618	0.612	0.608	0.604	0.599	0.594	0.589	0.585	0.58	0.575	0.569	0.563	0.557	0.551	0.545	0.538	0.531	0.523	0.516	0.509	0.501	0.494	0.487	0.48	0.473
Gambia	0.41	0.406	0.39	0.381	0.373	0.367	0.362	0.357	0.345	0.337	0.335	0.335	0.333	0.324	0.314	0.303	0.293	0.284	0.274	0.264	0.254	0.245	0.236	0.228	0.219	0.21	0.205	0.199	0.194	0.188	0.183
Georgia	0.89	0.862	0.851	0.845	0.835	0.831	0.816	0.804	0.79	0.779	0.777	0.775	0.761	0.77	0.752	0.753	0.74	0.731	0.724	0.721	0.717										
Germany	0.96	0.943	0.943	0.94	0.937	0.934	0.933	0.931	0.933	0.93	0.925	0.923	0.919	0.915	0.911	0.893	0.894	0.871	0.856	0.84	0.825	0.81	0.794	0.775	0.767	0.759	0.75	0.74	0.715	0.705	0.692
Ghana	0.55	0.563	0.558	0.555	0.556	0.538	0.545	0.538	0.53	0.533	0.526	0.516	0.511	0.492	0.469	0.454	0.437	0.423	0.427	0.419	0.427	0.416	0.411	0.409	0.405	0.402	0.397	0.391	0.386	0.381	0.375
Greece	0.96	0.849	0.833	0.833	0.824	0.833	0.831	0.812	0.805	0.795	0.793	0.794	0.785	0.764	0.775	0.768	0.742	0.724	0.714	0.69	0.672	0.659	0.659	0.639	0.632	0.627	0.626	0.619	0.623	0.624	0.607
Grenada	0.77	0.77	0.755	0.75	0.758	0.754	0.747	0.74	0.733	0.726	0.719	0.711	0.703	0.695	0.687	0.678	0.67	0.662	0.654												
Guatemala	0.49	0.519	0.511	0.511	0.511	0.512	0.51	0.453	0.45	0.443	0.437	0.43	0.423	0.416	0.403	0.39	0.386	0.382	0.379	0.368	0.358	0.349	0.339	0.33	0.32	0.311	0.304	0.3	0.294	0.289	0.284
Guinea	0.37	0.354	0.35	0.348	0.347	0.343	0.34	0.333	0.322	0.309	0.288	0.28	0.281	0.272	0.265	0.251	0.236	0.194	0.214	0.203	0.191	0.18	0.169	0.158	0.147	0.142	0.137	0.132	0.129	0.125	0.121
Guinea-Bissau	0.42	0.414	0.402	0.402	0.4	0.398	0.394	0.384	0.377	0.371	0.361	0.354	0.345	0.334	0.325	0.311															
Guyana		0.601	0.602	0.601	0.6	0.598	0.597	0.593	0.591	0.591	0.575	0.565	0.565	0.561	0.565	0.57	0.561	0.554	0.568	0.565	0.561	0.556	0.55	0.545	0.539	0.533	0.528	0.523	0.517	0.512	0.507
Haiti	0.48	0.456	0.45	0.445	0.437	0.43	0.424	0.417	0.411	0.407	0.399	0.394	0.389	0.384	0.378	0.373	0.368	0.362	0.356	0.351	0.345	0.339	0.333	0.328	0.322	0.316	0.31	0.305	0.299	0.294	0.288
Honduras	0.53	0.499	0.499	0.496	0.492	0.479	0.479	0.474	0.474	0.48	0.477	0.469	0.461	0.474	0.465	0.457	0.449	0.442	0.434	0.426	0.418	0.411	0.403	0.396	0.389	0.381	0.374	0.367	0.362	0.357	0.355
Hong Kong	0.88	0.88	0.871	0.863	0.859	0.85	0.844	0.828	0.824	0.807	0.808	0.807	0.798	0.783	0.781	0.762	0.747	0.731	0.716	0.701	0.686	0.682	0.677	0.673	0.669	0.665	0.66	0.655	0.65	0.645	0.64
Hungary	0.84	0.821	0.819	0.816	0.818	0.823	0.821	0.834	0.818	0.813	0.83	0.826	0.808	0.801	0.795	0.778	0.77	0.773	0.758	0.749	0.736	0.727	0.715	0.706	0.71	0.701	0.683	0.653	0.623	0.609	0.598
Iceland	0.99	0.926	0.918	0.912	0.912	0.906	0.906	0.898	0.883	0.868	0.853	0.849	0.846	0.842	0.838	0.835	0.828	0.827	0.813	0.796	0.789	0.778	0.774	0.758	0.742	0.738	0.731	0.721	0.722	0.71	0.678
India	0.59	0.555	0.553	0.558	0.544	0.54	0.53	0.514	0.505	0.491	0.478	0.466	0.464	0.452	0.441	0.429	0.419	0.409	0.39	0.382	0.379	0.372	0.365	0.358	0.351	0.344	0.338	0.331	0.324	0.317	0.311
Indonesia	0.66	0.65	0.642	0.637	0.634	0.622	0.615	0.614	0.607	0.598	0.586	0.579	0.559	0.559	0.567	0.552	0.551	0.543	0.533	0.524	0.518	0.504	0.485	0.467	0.441	0.42	0.409	0.398	0.394	0.391	0.389
Iran (Islamic Republic of)	0.75	0.756	0.75	0.749	0.747	0.739	0.738	0.738	0.731	0.684	0.662	0.651	0.64	0.631	0.633	0.552	0.546	0.55	0.546	0.544	0.53	0.524	0.514	0.504	0.493	0.483	0.466	0.449	0.432	0.414	0.397
Iraq	0.57	0.557	0.554	0.542	0.51	0.506	0.501	0.501	0.506	0.511	0.503	0.498	0.493	0.488	0.483	0.478	0.471	0.456	0.441	0.426	0.411	0.401	0.398	0.396	0.393	0.39	0.387	0.384	0.38	0.377	0.373
Ireland	0.92	0.922	0.918	0.918	0.918	0.91	0.91	0.893	0.877	0.862	0.857	0.877	0.88	0.87	0.866	0.87	0.864	0.851	0.84	0.827	0.818	0.809	0.798	0.723	0.714	0.71	0.703	0.693	0.675	0.665	0.66
Israel	0.86	0.883	0.881	0.879	0.881	0.88	0.879	0.874	0.875	0.871	0.86	0.855	0.851	0.855	0.838	0.847	0.846	0.848	0.849	0.827	0.82	0.82	0.803	0.786	0.769	0.763	0.757	0.75	0.74	0.729	0.714
Italy	0.82	0.793	0.791	0.785	0.785	0.784	0.786	0.785	0.787	0.787	0.778	0.774	0.771	0.765	0.757	0.748	0.741	0.733	0.722	0.712	0.7	0.694	0.686	0.678	0.665	0.656	0.647	0.631	0.62	0.609	0.599
Jamaica	0.68	0.689	0.691	0.692	0.687	0.687	0.681	0.681	0.685	0.689	0.691	0.694	0.697	0.645	0.625	0.618	0.611	0.569	0.586	0.576	0.548	0.555	0.55	0.545	0.54	0.534	0.529	0.524	0.519	0.513	0.509
Japan	0.85	0.851	0.85	0.848	0.846	0.839	0.838	0.83	0.823	0.813	0.802	0.796	0.792	0.788	0.785	0.779	0.774	0.768	0.764	0.759	0.754	0.747	0.741	0.745	0.74	0.735	0.728	0.715	0.702	0.697	0.691
Jordan	0.70	0.667	0.664	0.662	0.672	0.674	0.672	0.669	0.685	0.68	0.685	0.697	0.704	0.704	0.704	0.705	0.681	0.675	0.666	0.679	0.671	0.666	0.66	0.655	0.65	0.644	0.613	0.588	0.561	0.527	0.496
Kazakhstan	0.81	0.84	0.822	0.817	0.809	0.806	0.806	0.802	0.801	0.791	0.781	0.786	0.79	0.793	0.795	0.789	0.769	0.75	0.73	0.711	0.692	0.678	0.669	0.66	0.651	0.642	0.633	0.63	0.627	0.619	0.613
Kenya	0.61	0.534	0.536	0.536	0.535	0.534	0.528	0.522	0.515	0.508	0.501	0.494	0.484	0.475	0.476	0.455	0.451	0.434	0.412	0.414	0.407	0.405	0.402	0.399	0.396	0.393	0.39	0.386	0.383	0.379	0.376
Kiribati	0.63	0.594	0.59	0.59	0.59	0.583	0.595	0.594	0.594	0.593	0.593	0.588	0.585	0.575	0.575	0.581	0.578	0.581	0.556	0.556	0.516										
Korea (Republic of)	0.88	0.865	0.865	0.865	0.867	0.866	0.865	0.866	0.865	0.862	0.856	0.837	0.851	0.847	0.838	0.831	0.821	0.81	0.8	0.794	0.787	0.778	0.768	0.772	0.751	0.737	0.723	0.707	0.694	0.686	0.676
Kuwait	0.70	0.638	0.638	0.635	0.629	0.623	0.612	0.601	0.608	0.601	0.599	0.596	0.595	0.592	0.594	0.583	0.598	0.603	0.598	0.592	0.595	0.595	0.583	0.572	0.566	0.515	0.464	0.417	0.382	0.429	0.476
Kyrgyzstan	0.76	0.73	0.723	0.724	0.723	0.724	0.719	0.71	0.71	0.697	0.697	0.693	0.69	0.694	0.693	0.687	0.683	0.683	0.674	0.669	0.657	0.646	0.626	0.612	0.603	0.597	0.6	0.609	0.615	0.616	0.619
Lao People's Democratic Republic	0.47	0.481	0.479	0.483	0.485	0.479	0.468	0.462	0.459	0.447	0.429	0.42	0.41	0.402	0.395	0.39	0.382	0.375	0.364	0.354	0.352	0.35	0.345	0.336	0.328	0.309	0.315	0.304	0.299	0.294	0.288
Latvia	0.91	0.883	0.883	0.876	0.871	0.864	0.861	0.851	0.843	0.848	0.85	0.852	0.857	0.85	0.845	0.841	0.822	0.795	0.769	0.742	0.707	0.688	0.666	0.645	0.631	0.619	0.609	0.609	0.613	0.61	0.604
Lebanon	0.67	0.604	0.604	0.604	0.588	0.593	0.598	0.616	0.619	0.637	0.631	0.633	0.627	0.623	0.61	0.619															
Lesotho	0.56	0.532	0.528	0.525	0.521	0.516	0.515	0.51	0.505	0.498	0.492	0.498	0.48	0.482	0.475	0.473	0.471	0.469	0.46	0.456	0.45	0.428	0.429	0.429	0.429	0.43	0.424	0.413	0.419	0.418	0.415
Liberia	0.50	0.426	0.422	0.422	0.417	0.415	0.421	0.42	0.414	0.428	0.4	0.401	0.402	0.403	0.403	0.404	0.405	0.406	0.406	0.407	0.408	0.354									
Libya	0.62	0.61	0.607	0.607	0.602	0.606	0.609	0.613	0.616	0.625	0.634	0.635	0.637	0.639	0.64	0.642	0.644	0.646	0.642	0.631	0.621	0.61	0.6	0.589	0.579	0.568	0.558	0.548	0.537	0.527	0.516
Liechtenstein	0.84	0.832	0.832	0.827	0.827	0.818	0.818	0.824	0.827	0.819	0.807	0.795	0.796	0.782	0.775	0.767	0.763	0.751	0.739	0.728	0.716										
Lithuania	0.91	0.898	0.89	0.89	0.887	0.883	0.878	0.857	0.855	0.86	0.854	0.852	0.873	0.867	0.862	0.849	0.829	0.82	0.799	0.78	0.758	0.74	0.718	0.699	0.679	0.661	0.65	0.647	0.651	0.658	0.655
Luxembourg	0.82	0.806	0.802	0.802	0.798	0.788	0.783	0.778	0.779	0.78	0.78	0.774	0.767	0.766	0.759	0.752	0.746	0.739	0.734	0.725	0.717	0.712	0.684	0.668	0.657	0.639	0.633	0.625	0.618	0.61	0.602
Madagascar	0.41	0.486	0.489	0.494	0.494	0.498	0.494	0.492	0.489	0.484	0.484	0.481	0.465	0.453	0.443	0.438	0.428	0.42	0.412	0.404	0.399										
Malawi	0.45	0.47	0.463	0.455	0.455	0.457	0.456	0.45	0.436	0.433	0.428	0.421	0.406	0.383	0.381	0.373	0.375	0.387	0.388	0.388	0.378	0.395	0.392	0.387	0.381	0.385	0.29	0.28	0.271	0.239	0.231
Malaysia	0.72	0.726	0.719	0.724	0.718	0.713	0.708	0.701	0.696	0.694	0.687	0.676	0.664	0.64	0.615	0.608	0.621	0.62	0.611	0.613	0.619	0.603	0.594	0.574	0.555	0.536	0.527	0.518	0.511	0.499	0.488
Maldives	0.60	0.573	0.564	0.564	0.563	0.559	0.546	0.532	0.525	0.513	0.494	0.477	0.47	0.461	0.458	0.451	0.451	0.451	0.435	0.438	0.43	0.419	0.401	0.384	0.368	0.354					
Mali	0.25	0.286	0.286	0.282	0.278	0.274	0.285	0.279	0.284	0.283	0.277	0.27	0.26	0.222	0.237	0.226	0.214	0.203	0.191	0.179	0.168	0.159	0.146	0.136	0.123	0.114	0.106	0.098	0.091	0.085	0.081
Malta	0.86	0.825	0.824	0.816	0.813	0.802	0.798	0.789	0.777	0.763	0.769	0.744	0.733	0.734	0.729	0.737	0.7	0.678	0.662	0.657	0.648	0.647	0.646	0.631	0.625	0.622	0.62	0.618	0.614	0.61	0.605
Marshall Islands	0.84	0.707	0.707	0.707																											
Mauritania	0.38	0.396	0.392	0.389	0.397	0.385	0.381	0.371	0.359	0.344	0.338	0.333	0.317	0.318	0.319	0.311	0.307	0.291	0.286	0.282	0.279	0.274	0.266	0.253	0.249	0.24	0.234	0.212	0.195	0.184	0.178
Mauritius	0.73	0.736	0.733	0.73	0.728	0.721	0.729	0.707	0.699	0.681	0.664	0.655	0.642	0.632	0.623	0.614	0.595	0.583	0.569	0.561	0.546	0.542	0.535	0.527	0.524	0.52	0.512	0.504	0.497	0.489	0.481
Mexico	0.71	0.703	0.694	0.681	0.677	0.672	0.661	0.652	0.658	0.649	0.634	0.637	0.627	0.621	0.62	0.604	0.589	0.572	0.566	0.553	0.544	0.532	0.526	0.521	0.516	0.512	0.5	0.491	0.487	0.481	0.48
Micronesia (Federated States of)	0.56	0.581	0.578	0.574	0.567	0.56	0.561	0.558	0.556	0.554	0.55	0.541	0.54	0.527	0.515	0.503	0.49	0.478	0.465	0.453	0.441										
Moldova (Republic of)	0.80	0.711	0.708	0.708	0.707	0.709	0.713	0.716	0.709	0.699	0.696	0.697	0.698	0.7	0.69	0.676	0.666	0.652	0.638	0.623	0.617	0.615	0.603	0.59	0.586	0.593	0.594	0.595	0.596	0.597	0.598
Mongolia	0.69	0.736	0.734	0.733	0.731	0.752	0.746	0.742	0.738	0.734	0.721	0.701	0.685	0.668	0.652	0.639	0.612	0.593	0.57	0.557	0.534	0.518	0.508	0.495	0.486	0.474	0.473	0.474	0.504	0.527	0.539
Montenegro	0.86	0.803	0.801	0.796	0.794	0.792	0.791	0.79	0.789	0.788	0.787	0.78	0.767	0.751	0.734	0.718	0.705	0.693													
Morocco	0.63	0.569	0.559	0.547	0.538	0.518	0.511	0.495	0.48	0.463	0.449	0.437	0.429	0.422	0.412	0.409	0.401	0.391	0.378	0.362	0.349	0.332	0.317	0.311	0.303	0.295	0.285	0.274	0.264	0.257	0.254
Mozambique	0.45	0.395	0.389	0.385	0.381	0.373	0.367	0.364	0.345	0.344	0.373	0.366	0.36	0.347	0.328	0.318	0.298	0.282	0.268	0.253	0.236	0.22	0.206	0.191	0.177	0.159	0.147	0.139	0.134	0.133	0.131
Myanmar	0.53	0.464	0.458	0.452	0.44	0.436	0.431	0.427	0.417	0.407	0.392	0.381	0.37	0.359	0.35	0.344	0.339	0.334	0.329	0.324	0.319	0.315	0.31	0.305	0.301	0.296	0.296	0.291	0.286	0.268	0.251
Namibia	0.57	0.584	0.582	0.581	0.571	0.569	0.565	0.562	0.557	0.549	0.538	0.528	0.521	0.519	0.513	0.516	0.518	0.52	0.517	0.521	0.51	0.506	0.514	0.517	0.523	0.528	0.532	0.52	0.508	0.496	0.495
Nepal	0.53	0.521	0.516	0.507	0.513	0.509	0.499	0.492	0.478	0.454	0.442	0.414	0.393	0.379	0.373	0.357	0.35	0.344	0.339	0.32	0.328	0.325	0.32	0.315	0.31	0.299	0.295	0.293	0.291	0.283	0.276
Netherlands	0.94	0.914	0.912	0.909	0.908	0.906	0.903	0.9	0.897	0.896	0.871	0.865	0.866	0.862	0.851	0.844	0.835	0.832	0.824	0.829	0.821	0.813	0.815	0.814	0.822	0.815	0.829	0.764	0.756	0.756	0.746
New Zealand	0.97	0.926	0.923	0.923	0.919	0.914	0.907	0.905	0.903	0.901	0.899	0.897	0.894	0.892	0.89	0.888	0.888	0.888	0.887	0.872	0.869	0.864	0.869	0.867	0.858	0.854	0.846	0.829	0.807	0.797	0.787
Nicaragua	0.65	0.573	0.566	0.566	0.562	0.555	0.553	0.536	0.529	0.524	0.52	0.513	0.506	0.498	0.491	0.488	0.485	0.482	0.479	0.468	0.457	0.445	0.433	0.422	0.41	0.398	0.39	0.383	0.375	0.366	0.349
Niger	0.28	0.249	0.247	0.245	0.233	0.226	0.217	0.209	0.2	0.189	0.18	0.17	0.162	0.154	0.149	0.144	0.137	0.126	0.124	0.12	0.116	0.112	0.109	0.105	0.101	0.097	0.093	0.09	0.086	0.084	0.082
Nigeria	0.55	0.499	0.488	0.484	0.474	0.474	0.475	0.475	0.437	0.424	0.407	0.438	0.435	0.431	0.428	0.426	0.424	0.411													
North Macedonia	0.75	0.704	0.702	0.697	0.695	0.689	0.676	0.673	0.67	0.667	0.662	0.657	0.653	0.624	0.616	0.608	0.593	0.581	0.569	0.557	0.544										
Norway	0.96	0.93	0.928	0.926	0.918	0.912	0.907	0.915	0.907	0.914	0.912	0.905	0.905	0.907	0.906	0.901	0.912	0.892	0.88	0.878	0.888	0.876	0.867	0.84	0.832	0.825	0.839	0.808	0.792	0.782	0.777
Oman	0.77	0.718	0.718	0.731	0.718	0.717	0.694	0.681	0.664	0.647	0.635	0.627	0.614	0.577	0.562	0.553	0.543	0.531	0.51	0.492	0.475										
Pakistan	0.36	0.402	0.392	0.392	0.38	0.372	0.365	0.356	0.351	0.349	0.345	0.339	0.332	0.32	0.317	0.31	0.29	0.29	0.28	0.27	0.259	0.254	0.248	0.243	0.237	0.232	0.226	0.221	0.215	0.21	0.205
Palau	0.84	0.855	0.848	0.853	0.849	0.845	0.884	0.882	0.803	0.801	0.795	0.79	0.784	0.779	0.773	0.767	0.766	0.765	0.763	0.762	0.761										
Palestine, State of	0.7	0.678	0.676	0.675	0.67	0.668	0.663	0.66	0.671	0.662	0.656	0.651	0.643	0.639	0.62	0.611	0.607														
Panama	0.73	0.7	0.697	0.697	0.692	0.681	0.681	0.674	0.668	0.662	0.665	0.665	0.663	0.665	0.661	0.658	0.655	0.651	0.645	0.637	0.627	0.617	0.607	0.596	0.586	0.577	0.565	0.562	0.552	0.543	0.538
Papua New Guinea	0.49	0.439	0.432	0.43	0.429	0.429	0.42	0.425	0.391	0.419	0.405	0.389	0.375	0.367	0.353	0.34	0.33	0.316	0.306	0.296	0.284	0.273	0.268	0.259	0.25	0.241	0.225	0.228	0.221	0.214	0.207
Paraguay	0.69	0.638	0.635	0.634	0.631	0.635	0.624	0.624	0.605	0.604	0.599	0.576	0.582	0.568	0.569	0.581	0.579	0.57	0.568	0.546	0.524	0.52	0.509	0.499	0.488	0.48	0.471	0.463	0.451	0.442	0.431
Peru	0.75	0.74	0.728	0.721	0.718	0.709	0.719	0.697	0.689	0.678	0.652	0.656	0.653	0.642	0.635	0.653	0.647	0.636	0.646	0.655	0.636	0.636	0.613	0.59	0.586	0.581	0.568	0.558	0.555	0.556	0.551
Philippines	0.69	0.678	0.667	0.665	0.663	0.665	0.661	0.655	0.644	0.633	0.622	0.615	0.624	0.619	0.61	0.611	0.611	0.589	0.584	0.573	0.572	0.565	0.556	0.552	0.549	0.536	0.533	0.53	0.527	0.523	0.519
Poland	0.90	0.869	0.866	0.866	0.866	0.855	0.849	0.853	0.817	0.833	0.832	0.822	0.815	0.811	0.808	0.804	0.796	0.811	0.804	0.787	0.777	0.77	0.756	0.741	0.723	0.713	0.71	0.698	0.676	0.671	0.665
Portugal	0.81	0.768	0.763	0.763	0.763	0.767	0.751	0.739	0.73	0.721	0.712	0.702	0.688	0.684	0.683	0.692	0.686	0.681	0.669	0.669	0.661	0.652	0.661	0.652	0.644	0.632	0.621	0.606	0.573	0.55	0.536
Qatar	0.72	0.659	0.653	0.662	0.655	0.642	0.634	0.651	0.682	0.651	0.637	0.657	0.663	0.652	0.648	0.657	0.646	0.642	0.625	0.616	0.613	0.611	0.604	0.596	0.588	0.562	0.545	0.523	0.502	0.503	0.507
Romania	0.78	0.765	0.762	0.764	0.772	0.767	0.765	0.767	0.763	0.777	0.783	0.786	0.777	0.756	0.733	0.716	0.703	0.683	0.667	0.657	0.654	0.648	0.634	0.628	0.622	0.606	0.598	0.597	0.6	0.609	0.632
Russian Federation	0.78	0.823	0.823	0.823	0.815	0.804	0.801	0.794	0.793	0.783	0.772	0.763	0.77	0.767	0.764	0.762	0.76	0.757	0.746	0.735	0.724	0.705	0.694	0.682	0.674	0.662	0.656	0.658	0.662	0.664	0.663
Rwanda	0.51	0.458	0.462	0.462	0.446	0.452	0.453	0.451	0.442	0.437	0.437	0.416	0.394	0.395	0.381	0.354	0.337	0.316	0.296	0.282	0.276	0.262	0.243	0.248	0.244	0.239	0.235	0.23	0.226	0.222	0.218
Saint Kitts and Nevis	0.87	0.673	0.661	0.658	0.658	0.654	0.658	0.657	0.616	0.627	0.622	0.609	0.603	0.575	0.564	0.553															
Saint Lucia	0.64	0.672	0.673	0.681	0.668	0.664	0.64	0.627	0.641	0.653	0.644	0.637	0.628	0.607	0.608	0.594	0.584	0.591	0.592	0.592	0.593										
Saint Vincent and the Grenadines	0.83	0.684	0.68	0.679	0.68	0.682	0.68	0.656	0.652	0.658	0.651	0.652	0.654	0.642	0.639	0.636	0.629	0.626	0.616	0.613	0.606										
Samoa	0.72	0.713	0.701	0.701	0.698	0.698	0.7	0.697	0.694	0.697	0.692	0.677	0.666	0.666	0.662	0.658	0.654	0.642	0.637	0.632	0.627	0.627	0.619	0.61	0.609	0.604	0.598	0.593	0.588	0.582	0.577
Sao Tome and Principe	0.56	0.567	0.567	0.557	0.534	0.532	0.5	0.489	0.476	0.466	0.455	0.453	0.436	0.441	0.437	0.433	0.426	0.418	0.413	0.408	0.402	0.394	0.386	0.379	0.371	0.363	0.355	0.347	0.339	0.331	0.323
Saudi Arabia	0.86	0.789	0.789	0.784	0.803	0.802	0.787	0.77	0.747	0.719	0.691	0.664	0.649	0.634	0.619	0.604	0.594	0.58	0.572	0.563	0.555	0.549	0.542	0.535	0.529	0.522	0.515	0.508	0.502	0.495	0.489
Senegal	0.35	0.345	0.356	0.354	0.355	0.354	0.345	0.342	0.33	0.304	0.301	0.294	0.29	0.278	0.268	0.264	0.257	0.249	0.242	0.235	0.213	0.208	0.206	0.204	0.203	0.202	0.201	0.2	0.199	0.198	0.198
Serbia	0.80	0.783	0.783	0.778	0.775	0.766	0.754	0.74	0.739	0.744	0.722	0.726	0.724	0.716	0.716	0.713	0.7	0.693	0.684	0.684	0.677	0.671	0.666	0.66	0.654	0.648	0.641	0.633	0.626	0.618	0.61
Seychelles	0.88	0.726	0.715	0.718	0.717	0.717	0.691	0.694	0.645	0.686	0.684	0.669	0.656	0.64	0.585	0.621	0.592	0.595	0.588	0.576	0.588										
Sierra Leone	0.37	0.406	0.403	0.399	0.387	0.382	0.374	0.372	0.364	0.357	0.349	0.342	0.334	0.326	0.318	0.311	0.303	0.295	0.287	0.279	0.27	0.26	0.251	0.242	0.232	0.223	0.213	0.203	0.194	0.184	0.19
Singapore	0.86	0.924	0.921	0.913	0.892	0.875	0.843	0.813	0.808	0.796	0.788	0.754	0.751	0.736	0.741	0.739	0.688	0.681	0.67	0.657	0.649	0.633	0.616	0.6	0.583	0.566	0.551	0.535	0.519	0.503	0.488
Slovakia	0.85	0.826	0.824	0.824	0.822	0.823	0.821	0.823	0.824	0.818	0.802	0.795	0.788	0.779	0.765	0.753	0.74	0.729	0.718	0.707	0.712	0.713	0.716	0.708	0.713	0.714	0.706	0.699	0.693	0.686	0.679
Slovenia	0.92	0.91	0.899	0.893	0.885	0.875	0.876	0.881	0.859	0.878	0.878	0.873	0.868	0.862	0.862	0.854	0.852	0.843	0.831	0.818	0.795	0.788	0.761	0.744	0.732	0.724	0.714	0.708	0.709	0.699	0.696
Solomon Islands	0.51	0.474	0.469	0.469	0.465	0.468	0.466	0.467	0.468	0.471	0.467	0.432	0.426	0.421	0.413	0.394	0.388	0.383	0.377	0.357	0.336	0.35									
South Africa	0.77	0.724	0.721	0.718	0.718	0.72	0.705	0.695	0.685	0.674	0.696	0.694	0.681	0.66	0.656	0.655	0.653	0.651	0.644	0.609	0.652	0.649	0.646	0.643	0.639	0.636	0.617	0.603	0.581	0.552	0.532
South Sudan	0.35	0.307	0.309	0.309	0.309	0.309	0.309	0.317	0.325	0.333	0.297																				
Spain	0.85	0.831	0.838	0.836	0.832	0.827	0.816	0.804	0.803	0.795	0.781	0.765	0.759	0.752	0.745	0.739	0.726	0.72	0.717	0.716	0.715	0.709	0.704	0.701	0.697	0.687	0.671	0.651	0.627	0.609	0.591
Sri Lanka	0.72	0.746	0.741	0.736	0.735	0.751	0.749	0.747	0.744	0.743	0.739	0.738	0.738	0.721	0.716	0.71	0.704	0.698	0.692	0.689	0.679	0.67	0.661	0.652	0.642	0.633	0.625	0.606	0.608	0.6	0.592
Sudan	0.37	0.345	0.339	0.337	0.336	0.333	0.327	0.323	0.311	0.301	0.306	0.305	0.298	0.282	0.283	0.274	0.268	0.255	0.249	0.244	0.238	0.23	0.222	0.214	0.206	0.198	0.191	0.183	0.175	0.167	0.159
Suriname	0.59	0.675	0.661	0.661	0.659	0.658	0.642	0.64	0.634	0.61	0.595	0.593	0.583	0.579	0.576	0.572	0.57														
Sweden	0.95	0.918	0.914	0.914	0.914	0.912	0.909	0.907	0.854	0.851	0.853	0.845	0.843	0.854	0.854	0.853	0.852	0.894	0.886	0.883	0.881	0.878	0.874	0.845	0.821	0.807	0.794	0.779	0.725	0.715	0.71
Switzerland	0.93	0.9	0.9	0.888	0.885	0.885	0.877	0.888	0.885	0.88	0.877	0.873	0.855	0.844	0.834	0.823	0.819	0.813	0.805	0.807	0.803	0.789	0.776	0.758	0.741	0.727	0.721	0.716	0.706	0.701	0.695
Syrian Arab Republic	0.40	0.416	0.416	0.416	0.414	0.413	0.431	0.463	0.567	0.545	0.534	0.54	0.533	0.537	0.522	0.509	0.485	0.464	0.442	0.444	0.433	0.43	0.427	0.424	0.422	0.419	0.419	0.419	0.419	0.419	0.417
Tajikistan	0.68	0.682	0.673	0.67	0.668	0.663	0.664	0.667	0.668	0.668	0.671	0.671	0.673	0.649	0.652	0.649	0.646	0.645	0.634	0.627	0.626	0.621	0.625	0.63	0.634	0.639	0.633	0.646	0.663	0.658	0.652
Tanzania (United Republic of)	0.44	0.429	0.425	0.431	0.436	0.431	0.418	0.415	0.426	0.415	0.416	0.41	0.4	0.39	0.38	0.37	0.354	0.343	0.332	0.323	0.314	0.306	0.297	0.288	0.286	0.287	0.285	0.284	0.28	0.278	0.273
Thailand	0.73	0.682	0.675	0.665	0.65	0.64	0.629	0.615	0.626	0.626	0.611	0.618	0.611	0.607	0.576	0.585	0.568	0.555	0.544	0.532	0.517	0.501	0.485	0.463	0.446	0.433	0.425	0.416	0.406	0.398	0.387
Timor-Leste	0.58	0.51	0.496	0.496	0.495	0.497	0.498	0.501	0.508	0.51	0.493	0.476	0.468	0.443	0.428	0.414	0.399	0.384	0.37	0.364	0.364										
Togo	0.56	0.517	0.51	0.507	0.5	0.495	0.491	0.489	0.483	0.477	0.464	0.45	0.436	0.423	0.437	0.425	0.421	0.416	0.41	0.405	0.395	0.387	0.379	0.371	0.363	0.348	0.321	0.316	0.31	0.322	0.31
Tonga	0.86	0.775	0.771	0.77	0.769	0.772	0.734	0.738	0.735	0.729	0.723	0.711	0.702	0.697	0.68	0.678	0.678	0.709	0.683	0.676	0.669	0.683	0.684	0.685	0.685	0.685	0.679	0.673	0.668	0.662	0.656
Trinidad and Tobago	0.75	0.728	0.728	0.728	0.721	0.714	0.704	0.7	0.701	0.713	0.712	0.712	0.705	0.692	0.674	0.652	0.665	0.655	0.638	0.647	0.636	0.633	0.594	0.611	0.604	0.597	0.589	0.582	0.577	0.575	0.575
Tunisia	0.66	0.661	0.659	0.653	0.647	0.645	0.64	0.638	0.633	0.635	0.625	0.614	0.612	0.601	0.594	0.586	0.573	0.557	0.549	0.539	0.526	0.513	0.496	0.477	0.47	0.459	0.448	0.431	0.42	0.413	0.406
Turkey	0.85	0.731	0.727	0.722	0.717	0.704	0.7	0.682	0.643	0.622	0.602	0.569	0.553	0.552	0.541	0.534	0.532	0.53	0.524	0.51	0.493	0.477	0.459	0.442	0.435	0.427	0.421	0.416	0.41	0.404	0.399
Turkmenistan	0.74	0.653	0.645	0.628	0.628	0.628	0.627	0.626	0.626	0.625	0.624																				
Uganda	0.53	0.523	0.515	0.507	0.504	0.501	0.495	0.489	0.483	0.487	0.493	0.477	0.473	0.461	0.453	0.445	0.442	0.464	0.458	0.439	0.43	0.398	0.365	0.333	0.3	0.268	0.262	0.256	0.243	0.254	0.25
Ukraine	0.74	0.799	0.792	0.794	0.792	0.791	0.8	0.791	0.791	0.787	0.788	0.787	0.786	0.784	0.781	0.776	0.767	0.766	0.757	0.741	0.717	0.715	0.708	0.696	0.684	0.672	0.659	0.655	0.654	0.654	0.648
United Arab Emirates	0.87	0.802	0.802	0.783	0.743	0.735	0.711	0.697	0.687	0.678	0.669	0.659	0.65	0.641	0.631	0.622	0.609	0.6	0.591	0.582	0.573	0.561	0.548	0.545	0.545	0.544	0.528	0.509	0.499	0.493	0.474
United Kingdom	0.94	0.948	0.938	0.933	0.929	0.921	0.92	0.912	0.866	0.872	0.896	0.884	0.872	0.861	0.859	0.867	0.861	0.845	0.842	0.84	0.836	0.828	0.816	0.809	0.801	0.793	0.764	0.736	0.707	0.675	0.644
United States	0.91	0.9	0.899	0.899	0.896	0.893	0.892	0.891	0.898	0.897	0.892	0.887	0.882	0.869	0.865	0.862	0.859	0.857	0.853	0.851	0.845	0.863	0.867	0.867	0.867	0.869	0.866	0.863	0.853	0.843	0.839
Uruguay	0.84	0.765	0.763	0.759	0.753	0.743	0.741	0.735	0.727	0.717	0.707	0.698	0.688	0.686	0.693	0.688	0.697	0.697	0.685	0.674	0.661	0.648	0.643	0.629	0.615	0.609	0.605	0.601	0.597	0.601	0.597
Uzbekistan	0.74	0.729	0.726	0.724	0.709	0.705	0.701	0.699	0.692	0.681	0.674	0.667	0.659	0.657	0.649	0.645	0.639	0.634	0.627	0.614	0.601										
Vanuatu	0.57	0.561	0.545	0.542	0.54	0.544	0.529	0.529	0.527	0.525	0.523	0.521	0.519	0.516	0.514	0.512															
Venezuela (Bolivarian Republic of)	0.68	0.7	0.7	0.7	0.722	0.724	0.725	0.724	0.708	0.705	0.674	0.667	0.662	0.642	0.611	0.591	0.569	0.556	0.549	0.518	0.503	0.502	0.492	0.487	0.484	0.48	0.475	0.471	0.466	0.457	0.444
Viet Nam	0.73	0.63	0.626	0.626	0.621	0.619	0.613	0.614	0.608	0.602	0.583	0.598	0.561	0.55	0.539	0.528	0.518	0.507	0.496	0.485	0.474	0.464	0.455	0.415	0.427	0.413	0.4	0.387	0.374	0.361	0.348
Yemen	0.39	0.36	0.347	0.341	0.341	0.342	0.343	0.345	0.335	0.343	0.325	0.319	0.311	0.308	0.305	0.303	0.297	0.287	0.278	0.268	0.258	0.249	0.244	0.241	0.237	0.233	0.23	0.227	0.224	0.222	0.219
Zambia	0.55	0.557	0.553	0.549	0.544	0.538	0.532	0.532	0.529	0.526	0.526	0.524	0.522	0.513	0.522	0.514	0.505	0.495	0.486	0.477	0.468	0.463	0.457	0.452	0.447	0.442	0.426	0.411	0.396	0.38	0.365
Zimbabwe	0.61	0.587	0.57	0.568	0.565	0.56	0.557	0.55	0.549	0.526	0.523	0.516	0.509	0.502	0.495	0.488	0.485	0.483	0.493	0.502	0.488	0.481	0.475	0.469	0.463	0.456	0.45	0.443	0.437	0.441	0.423

== See also ==
- List of countries by literacy rate
- School-leaving age
