= Gross enrolment ratio =

Statistic in education

Gross enrolment ratio (GER) or gross enrolment index (GEI) is a statistical measure used in the education sector, and formerly by the UN in its Education Index, to determine the number of students enrolled in school at several different grade levels (like elementary, middle school and high school), and use it to show the ratio of the number of students who live in that country to those who qualify for the particular grade level. The United Nations Educational, Scientific and Cultural Organization (UNESCO), describes "Gross Enrolment Ratio" as the total enrolment within a country "in a specific level of education, regardless of age, expressed as a percentage of the population in the official age group corresponding to this level of education".

The GER can be over 100% as it includes students who may be older or younger than the official age group. This is because the GER includes students who are repeating a grade, those who enrolled late and are older than their classmates, or those who have advanced quickly and are younger than their classmates. This allows the total enrolment to exceed the population that corresponds to that level of education.

== UN Human Development Index use ==
A combined gross enrolment ratio (CGER), incorporating all three levels of education, was used to calculate the Human Development Index (HDI), an annual gauge of well-being for UN member states, from 1990 to 2009. Amongst other measures used in the calculation, the CGER was given one-third weight in assessing the knowledge component, represented by gross enrolment, while the adult literacy rate was given two-thirds weight.
