= Maximilian Auffhammer =

American economist

Maximilian Auffhammer (born 1973) is a UC-Berkeley based environmental economist who has produced some important forecasts of Chinese carbon dioxide releases. Auffhammer is an associate professor with a joint appointment in International Area Studies and Agricultural and Resource Economics. He received his Ph.D. in Economics from the University of California at San Diego. His research agenda focuses on forecasting Greenhouse Gas Emissions as well as studying the impacts of air pollution on agriculture. Geographically he is mainly interested in China and India as well as his chosen home—California.

Said Auffhammer regarding China's carbon pollution output, "The only solution is for a massive transfer of technology and wealth from the West."

His most recognized collaborated papers are: Forecasting the path of China's CO_{2} emissions using province-level information, Using Weather Data and Climate Model Output in Economic Analyses of Climate Change, and Clearing the air? The effects of gasoline content regulation on air quality.
