= List of countries by planetary pressures–adjusted Human Development Index =

This is a list of countries by planetary pressures–adjusted human development index (PHDI), as published by the UNDP in its 2020 Human Development Report. The index captures the HDI of a country adjusted for ecological and environmental factors like carbon dioxide emissions per person and material footprint. According to the PHDI, "The PHDI discounts the HDI for pressures on the planet to reflect a concern for intergenerational inequality, similar to the inequality-adjusted HDI adjustment which is motivated by a concern for intragenerational inequality."

== Methodology ==
The index captures the HDI of a country, after adjusting for its carbon dioxide emissions per person and material footprint per person. Without any carbon emissions and material footprint, the HDI and PHDI would be equal; the greater these factors are, the greater the difference between the two.

=== List (2023 data) ===
Data is sourced from The Human Development Report 2025.

Country	HDI value	PHDI value	SDG 9.4			SDG 8.4, 12.2	
Country	HDI value	PHDI value	Adjustment factor for planetary pressures	CO₂ per capita (tonnes)	CO₂ index	Material footprint per capita (tonnes)	Material footprint index
Iceland	0.972	0.735	0.756	10.0	0.869	32.2	0.643
Norway	0.970	0.723	0.746	7.1	0.907	37.5	0.584
Switzerland	0.970	0.732	0.755	3.7	0.951	39.8	0.559
Denmark	0.962	0.792	0.824	4.6	0.940	26.4	0.708
Germany	0.959	0.785	0.819	7.2	0.907	24.3	0.730
Sweden	0.959	0.810	0.845	3.4	0.955	24.0	0.734
Australia	0.958	0.700	0.731	14.5	0.811	31.5	0.651
Netherlands	0.955	0.740	0.775	6.7	0.912	32.7	0.638
Belgium	0.951	0.666	0.700	7.1	0.907	45.7	0.494
Ireland	0.949	0.752	0.793	6.8	0.911	29.4	0.674
Finland	0.948	0.748	0.789	5.7	0.926	31.4	0.652
Singapore	0.946	0.618	0.653	8.2	0.893	53.0	0.412
United Kingdom	0.946	0.827	0.875	4.5	0.941	17.3	0.808
United Arab Emirates	0.940	0.585	0.622	24.1	0.685	39.8	0.559
Canada	0.939	0.643	0.684	14.2	0.815	40.3	0.554
New Zealand	0.938	0.731	0.779	5.8	0.925	33.1	0.634
United States	0.938	0.686	0.731	14.4	0.811	31.5	0.651
South Korea	0.937	0.745	0.795	11.2	0.854	23.9	0.736
Slovenia	0.931	0.791	0.850	5.3	0.930	20.8	0.769
Austria	0.930	0.757	0.814	6.5	0.915	25.8	0.714
Japan	0.925	0.785	0.849	8.0	0.895	17.9	0.802
Malta	0.924	0.799	0.864	3.4	0.956	20.5	0.773
Luxembourg	0.922	0.479	0.519	10.7	0.861	74.2	0.178
France	0.920	0.804	0.874	4.2	0.945	17.7	0.804
Israel	0.919	0.709	0.772	6.5	0.915	33.6	0.628
Spain	0.918	0.818	0.891	4.7	0.939	14.2	0.843
Czech Republic	0.915	0.764	0.835	8.2	0.894	20.2	0.776
Italy	0.915	0.801	0.876	5.3	0.930	16.2	0.821
Cyprus	0.913	0.754	0.826	5.7	0.926	24.7	0.726
Greece	0.908	0.803	0.884	5.3	0.930	14.6	0.838
Poland	0.906	0.792	0.874	7.1	0.908	14.5	0.840
Estonia	0.905	0.714	0.789	7.6	0.901	29.1	0.677
Saudi Arabia	0.900	0.666	0.740	19.9	0.740	23.5	0.739
Bahrain	0.899	0.632	0.703	24.6	0.679	24.6	0.728
Lithuania	0.895	0.751	0.840	4.6	0.940	23.6	0.739
Portugal	0.890	0.797	0.896	3.6	0.953	14.5	0.839
Croatia	0.889	0.787	0.886	4.4	0.943	15.5	0.828
Latvia	0.889	0.749	0.843	3.6	0.954	24.2	0.732
Qatar	0.886	0.276	0.311	42.6	0.444	74.1	0.179
Slovakia	0.880	0.770	0.875	5.3	0.931	16.3	0.819
Chile	0.878	0.784	0.893	3.9	0.949	14.6	0.838
Hungary	0.870	0.757	0.870	4.0	0.948	18.8	0.792
Argentina	0.865	0.763	0.882	4.3	0.944	16.3	0.819
Uruguay	0.862	0.804	0.933	2.3	0.970	9.5	0.895
Oman	0.858	0.581	0.677	16.9	0.779	38.5	0.574
Turkey	0.853	0.729	0.854	5.0	0.934	20.4	0.774
Kuwait	0.852	0.531	0.624	23.0	0.699	40.8	0.548
Bulgaria	0.845	0.740	0.875	5.4	0.930	16.2	0.821
Romania	0.845	0.739	0.874	3.4	0.955	18.6	0.794
Georgia	0.844	0.772	0.915	3.2	0.959	11.6	0.871
Panama	0.839	0.643	0.766	3.1	0.959	38.5	0.573
Brunei	0.837	0.600	0.717	26.0	0.661	20.4	0.774
Kazakhstan	0.837	0.687	0.820	13.0	0.830	17.1	0.811
Costa Rica	0.833	0.774	0.929	1.6	0.979	11.0	0.878
Serbia	0.833	0.724	0.869	5.9	0.923	16.7	0.815
Russia	0.832	0.710	0.853	12.6	0.836	11.7	0.871
Bahamas	0.820	0.712	0.868	6.1	0.921	16.7	0.815
Malaysia	0.819	0.677	0.827	8.4	0.890	21.4	0.763
North Macedonia	0.815	0.754	0.925	3.6	0.953	9.3	0.897
Armenia	0.811	0.761	0.938	2.7	0.964	8.0	0.912
Albania	0.810	0.755	0.933	1.8	0.976	10.0	0.889
Bosnia and Herzegovina	0.804	0.701	0.872	6.3	0.918	15.7	0.826
Iran	0.799	0.725	0.907	9.2	0.880	5.9	0.934
Thailand	0.798	0.726	0.910	3.7	0.952	11.9	0.869
China	0.797	0.644	0.808	8.3	0.891	24.9	0.724
Peru	0.794	0.757	0.953	1.6	0.979	6.6	0.927
Azerbaijan	0.789	0.737	0.934	4.2	0.945	6.9	0.924
Mexico	0.789	0.721	0.914	3.8	0.951	11.2	0.876
Colombia	0.788	0.740	0.939	2.0	0.974	8.6	0.905
Brazil	0.786	0.702	0.893	2.2	0.971	16.6	0.816
Moldova	0.785	0.738	0.940	1.7	0.977	8.8	0.903
Ukraine	0.779	0.717	0.920	3.7	0.952	10.0	0.889
Ecuador	0.777	0.735	0.946	2.4	0.969	6.9	0.923
Dominican Republic	0.776	0.726	0.936	2.8	0.963	8.3	0.908
Sri Lanka	0.776	0.754	0.971	0.9	0.988	4.1	0.955
Vietnam	0.766	0.699	0.913	3.4	0.956	11.7	0.870
Turkmenistan	0.764	0.667	0.874	9.7	0.873	11.4	0.874
Algeria	0.763	0.706	0.926	3.9	0.949	8.8	0.902
Cuba	0.762	0.723	0.949	2.1	0.973	6.8	0.924
Paraguay	0.756	0.689	0.912	1.2	0.985	14.6	0.839
Egypt	0.754	0.726	0.963	2.4	0.969	3.9	0.956
Jordan	0.754	0.714	0.947	1.9	0.976	7.4	0.918
Lebanon	0.752	0.691	0.919	3.6	0.953	10.3	0.886
Mongolia	0.747	0.577	0.773	13.6	0.823	25.0	0.723
Tunisia	0.746	0.703	0.942	2.6	0.966	7.3	0.919
South Africa	0.741	0.685	0.924	6.7	0.913	5.8	0.936
Uzbekistan	0.740	0.702	0.949	3.5	0.954	5.1	0.944
Bolivia	0.733	0.675	0.921	1.9	0.975	12.1	0.866
Gabon	0.733	0.704	0.961	2.2	0.971	4.4	0.951
Botswana	0.731	0.698	0.954	2.5	0.967	5.3	0.941
Indonesia	0.728	0.684	0.940	2.6	0.966	7.7	0.915
Belize	0.721	0.670	0.929	1.6	0.979	10.9	0.879
Libya	0.721	0.629	0.872	8.9	0.884	12.7	0.859
Jamaica	0.720	0.686	0.953	2.7	0.965	5.2	0.942
Kyrgyzstan	0.720	0.699	0.971	1.5	0.980	3.4	0.962
Philippines	0.720	0.680	0.944	1.3	0.983	8.6	0.905
Morocco	0.710	0.679	0.956	1.8	0.976	5.8	0.935
Venezuela	0.709	0.652	0.920	3.5	0.955	10.4	0.885
Nicaragua	0.706	0.668	0.946	0.8	0.990	8.8	0.902
Bhutan	0.698	0.593	0.849	2.2	0.972	24.7	0.727
Iraq	0.695	0.665	0.957	3.9	0.949	3.2	0.964
Tajikistan	0.691	0.673	0.974	0.9	0.988	3.6	0.960
Bangladesh	0.685	0.666	0.972	0.7	0.991	4.3	0.952
India	0.685	0.656	0.957	2.1	0.972	5.2	0.942
El Salvador	0.678	0.638	0.941	1.3	0.983	9.1	0.899
Equatorial Guinea	0.674	0.644	0.955	3.6	0.953	3.9	0.957
Palestine	0.674	0.653	0.969	0.7	0.992	4.9	0.946
Namibia	0.665	0.611	0.918	1.6	0.979	12.8	0.858
Guatemala	0.662	0.626	0.946	1.1	0.985	8.5	0.906
Congo	0.649	0.631	0.973	1.3	0.984	3.5	0.962
Honduras	0.645	0.620	0.961	1.0	0.986	5.9	0.935
Ghana	0.628	0.604	0.962	0.6	0.992	6.2	0.932
Kenya	0.628	0.610	0.971	0.4	0.995	4.8	0.946
Nepal	0.622	0.592	0.952	0.5	0.993	7.9	0.912
Laos	0.617	0.570	0.923	3.2	0.958	10.0	0.889
Angola	0.616	0.604	0.980	0.6	0.993	2.9	0.967
Myanmar	0.609	0.593	0.973	0.6	0.993	4.2	0.953
Cambodia	0.606	0.572	0.944	1.2	0.984	8.7	0.903
Zimbabwe	0.598	0.585	0.978	0.7	0.991	3.1	0.965
Zambia	0.595	0.585	0.983	0.4	0.995	2.7	0.970
Cameroon	0.588	0.574	0.976	0.3	0.995	4.0	0.956
Ivory Coast	0.582	0.537	0.922	0.5	0.994	13.5	0.850
Uganda	0.582	0.569	0.978	0.1	0.998	3.9	0.957
Rwanda	0.578	0.567	0.980	0.1	0.999	3.4	0.962
Papua New Guinea	0.576	0.566	0.982	0.8	0.989	2.3	0.974
Togo	0.571	0.562	0.984	0.3	0.996	2.5	0.972
Syria	0.564	0.553	0.981	1.1	0.986	2.2	0.976
Mauritania	0.563	0.542	0.962	0.9	0.988	5.8	0.936
Nigeria	0.560	0.548	0.979	0.6	0.993	3.2	0.965
Tanzania	0.555	0.541	0.975	0.3	0.997	4.3	0.953
Haiti	0.554	0.545	0.984	0.3	0.996	2.5	0.972
Pakistan	0.544	0.529	0.973	0.8	0.989	3.9	0.956
Senegal	0.530	0.512	0.966	0.7	0.991	5.4	0.940
Gambia	0.524	0.514	0.982	0.3	0.997	3.0	0.966
Democratic Republic of the Congo	0.522	0.517	0.990	0.0	0.999	1.8	0.980
Malawi	0.517	0.507	0.980	0.1	0.999	3.5	0.961
Benin	0.515	0.504	0.978	0.4	0.995	3.5	0.961
Djibouti	0.513	0.480	0.936	0.4	0.994	11.0	0.878
Sudan	0.511	0.498	0.974	0.4	0.995	4.2	0.954
Liberia	0.510	0.505	0.990	0.1	0.998	1.7	0.982
Eritrea	0.503	0.496	0.986	0.2	0.998	2.4	0.974
Guinea	0.500	0.488	0.975	0.3	0.996	4.1	0.955
Ethiopia	0.497	0.487	0.980	0.1	0.998	3.5	0.962
Afghanistan	0.496	0.492	0.991	0.3	0.997	1.2	0.986
Mozambique	0.493	0.486	0.986	0.2	0.997	2.3	0.975
Madagascar	0.487	0.481	0.988	0.1	0.998	2.0	0.977
Yemen	0.470	0.465	0.989	0.3	0.996	1.6	0.982
Sierra Leone	0.467	0.459	0.983	0.1	0.998	2.9	0.967
Burkina Faso	0.459	0.453	0.987	0.3	0.997	2.0	0.978
Burundi	0.439	0.435	0.991	0.1	0.999	1.6	0.982
Mali	0.419	0.411	0.981	0.3	0.996	3.2	0.965
Niger	0.419	0.410	0.979	0.1	0.999	3.6	0.960
Chad	0.416	0.397	0.954	0.2	0.998	8.1	0.910
Central African Republic	0.414	0.407	0.983	0.0	0.999	2.9	0.968
Somalia	0.404	0.396	0.979	0.0	1.000	3.7	0.959
South Sudan	0.388	0.383	0.986	0.1	0.998	2.3	0.974
OECD	0.916	0.752	0.821	8.2	0.893	22.6	0.750
World	0.756	0.680	0.900	4.5	0.941	12.7	0.859

== See also ==
- List of countries by Human Development Index
- List of countries by inequality-adjusted Human Development Index
