= Predrag Kojović =

Bosnian politician (born 1965)

Predrag Kojović Предраг Којовић
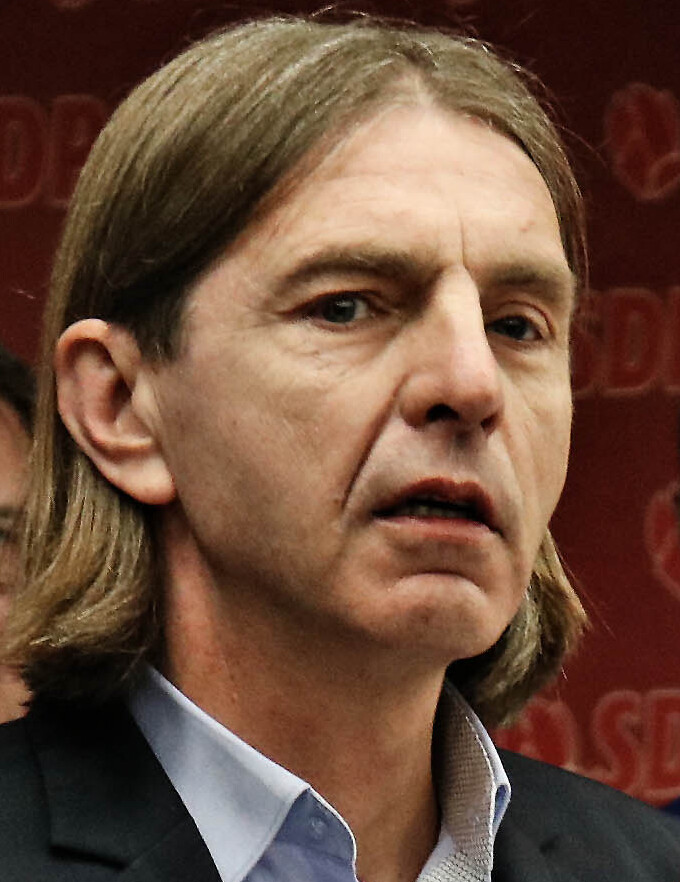
- Kojović in 2018

Member of the House of Representatives
- Incumbent
- Assumed office 6 December 2018
- Constituency: 3rd Electoral Unit FBiH
Parliamentary offices
Member of the Federal House of Peoples
In office
17 March 2011 – 20 February 2019
Additional positions
President of Our Party
In office 16 May 2015 – 4 September 2021
Preceded by	Dennis Gratz
Succeeded by	Edin Forto

Personal details
- Born: 2 July 1965 (age 61) Travnik, SR Bosnia and Herzegovina, SFR Yugoslavia
- Party: Our Party
- Spouse: Kimberley Music
- Education: University of Sarajevo (LL.B.)

Predrag "Peđa" Kojović (Serbo-Croatian Cyrillic: Предраг Којовић; born 2 July 1965) is a Bosnian politician and former journalist serving as member of the national House of Representatives since December 2018. He was previously a member of the Federal House of Peoples from 2011 to 2019. He was president of Our Party from 2015 to 2021.

Born in Travnik, Kojović earned a law degree from the University of Sarajevo. He initially worked as a journalist for Yutel, before joining Reuters. He was a correspondent during the Yugoslav Wars. A member of Our Party, Kojović was elected to the Sarajevo Canton Assembly in 2010, and was re-elected in 2014. He was simultaneously a delegate in the Federal House of Peoples. Kojović was elected to House of Representatives in the 2018 general election, and managed to get re-elected in the 2022 general election.

== Early life and career ==
Kojović, a Bosnian Serb, was born in Travnik on 2 July 1965. He graduated from the Faculty of Law in Sarajevo in 1988. Before the Yugoslav Wars, he worked as a journalist for Yutel, and from 1991 he worked as a reporter for Reuters, covering wars in Slovenia, Croatia and Bosnia and Herzegovina. Kojović was not a member of the Army of the Republic of Bosnia and Herzegovina, but he worked as a war correspondent. Later he worked as war correspondent across the world. Kojović worked for Reuters until 2008.

== Political career ==
A member of Our Party since its formation in 2008, Kojović was elected to the Sarajevo Canton Assembly in 2010 general election. He was re-elected in the 2014 general election, and simultaneously became a member of the Federal House of Peoples. On 16 May 2015, he was elected president of Our Party, succeeding Dennis Gratz.

On 28 June 2016, during a Sarajevo Canton Assembly session, BOSS member Rasim Smajić insulted Our Party member Sabina Ćudić, and then physically attacked Kojović who had come to Ćudić's defense. Subsequently, the Sarajevo Canton Prosecutor's Office filed an indictment against Smajić, which was confirmed by the local court in August 2016.

In the 2018 general election, Kojović was elected to the national House of Representatives. On 25 June 2021, Kojović resigned from his position as president of Our Party, stating that "the reasons are of a personal nature and I sincerely hope that there will be no malicious speculations and conspiracy theories in this regard." However, only three days later, on 28 June, he decided to stay as the party's president until its scheduled congress in September 2021. At the party's congress, held on 4 September, he was succeeded as party leader by Sarajevo Canton premier Edin Forto.

In the 2022 general election, Kojović was re-elected to the national House of Representatives, obtaining over 10,000 votes.

== Personal life ==
Kojović is married to Kimberley Music, and they live in Sarajevo. In July 2024, Kojović said that he was attacked by a taxi driver at the Sarajevo City Center after standing up for an Arab family who the driver refused to pick up.
