= Mario Nenadić =

Bosnian politician (born 1964)

Prime Minister of Sarajevo Canton
- In office 3 March 2020 – 5 January 2021
- Preceded by: Edin Forto
- Succeeded by: Edin Forto

Personal details
- Born: 25 March 1964 (age 62) Sarajevo, SR Bosnia and Herzegovina, SFR Yugoslavia
- Party: Union for a Better Future
- Education: University of Sarajevo (LL.B.)

Mario Nenadić (born 25 March 1964) is a Bosnian politician who served as Prime Minister of Sarajevo Canton from 2020 to 2021. He is a member of the Union for a Better Future.

== Early life and education ==
Nenadić was born in Sarajevo, SR Bosnia and Herzegovina, SFR Yugoslavia on 25 March 1964. He graduated from the Faculty of Law at the University of Sarajevo.

== Career ==
Nenadić was a long-term employee of the Bosnian Ministry of Human Rights and Refugees. He then worked at the Ministry of Civil Affairs and Communication from 1998 to 2000. After that, he became an assistant to the Minister of Human Rights and Refugees.

Nenadić later worked at the Bosnian Agency for Statistics, then again as an assistant to the Minister of Human Rights and Refugees and later as the Cantonal Minister of Justice and Administration from 2015 until 2018.

On 5 February 2020, Nenadić was chosen to serve as Prime Minister of Sarajevo Canton, as part of a three-party coalition which included his party, the Union for a Better Future. He officially became prime minister on 3 March 2020. Nenadić served as prime minister until 5 January 2021, after which he was succeeded by Edin Forto, following the 2020 municipal elections and a lacklustre showing of the three-party coalition.

== Personal life ==
Nenadić lives in Sarajevo with his wife. Apart from his native Bosnian, he also speaks English.

On 7 August 2020, Nenadić suffered a mild stroke. Six days later, on 13 August, Nenadić was released from hospital. On 3 November 2020, it was confirmed that he tested positive for COVID-19, amid its pandemic in Bosnia and Herzegovina.
