= Boriša Falatar =

Bosnian international official and politician (born 1975)

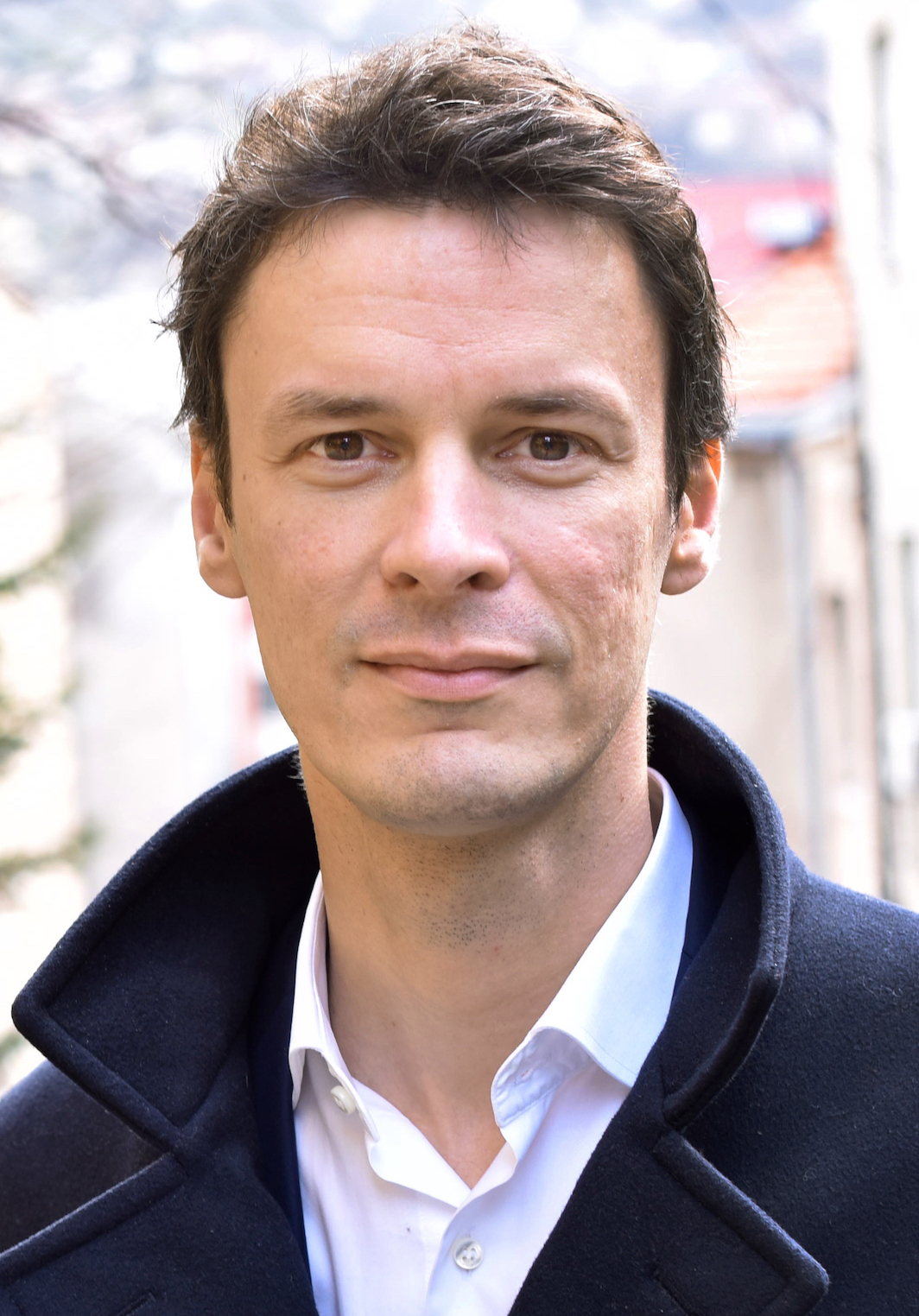
- Falatar in 2018

Personal details
- Born: 6 June 1975 (age 51) Sarajevo, SR Bosnia and Herzegovina, SFR Yugoslavia
- Party: Our Party
- Education: American University of Paris (BEc); London School of Economics (MS); Harvard Kennedy School (MPA)

Boriša Falatar (born 6 June 1975) is a Bosnian international official and politician currenty working for the European Commission. He ran for the Croat seat in the Presidency of Bosnia and Herzegovina in the 2018 Bosnian general election, as the lead candidate of Our Party, a social liberal and multi-ethnic political party.

== Early life and education ==
Falatar was born in Sarajevo, SR Bosnia and Herzegovina, SFR Yugoslavia on 6 June 1975, and was raised in a mixed Croat and Bosniak household. His parents are Miljenko Falatar, a mechanical engineer, and Dženana Balagija, a government economist related to both Džemal Bijedić and Nurija Pozderac, notable Bosnian political leaders who belonged to the Pozderac family.

Falatar attended elementary and secondary schools in Sarajevo. He graduated from the American University in Paris, France, where he earned a bachelor's degree in Economics. He continued his postgraduate studies at the London School of Economics, where he studied with professor Fred Halliday, and earned his master of sciences degree in Economic Development and International Relations. His master's thesis was on complex humanitarian emergencies, using Sarajevo as a case study.

Later on, Falatar attended Harvard University's Kennedy School of Government as a Mason Fellow, where he studied with Professors Ronald Heifetz, Marshall Ganz, Ricardo Hausmann, Michael Porter and others. Falatar earned his Master of Public Administration degree, and was elected class graduation speaker.

== Career ==
Falatar started his career as a humanitarian worker during the Bosnian War. During the siege of Sarajevo, as a 17-year-old, he operated a radio system which permitted thousands of citizens of Sarajevo to connect to the outside world. In 1993, Falatar joined the United Nations Protection Force (UNPROFOR), working with the Argentinean battalion. After finishing his post-graduate studies, Falatar joined the International Committee of the Red Cross. He led humanitarian protection activities in the Huambo province in Angola, providing humanitarian aid and reuniting kidnapped children with their families. Following the killing of UNITA leader Jonas Savimbi, Falatar negotiated with the Angolan government the reintegration of rebel UNITA soldiers.

He returned to the United Nations as an international civil servant in charge of UNESCO's relations with member states. From 2008 to 2011, Falatar worked at the UN Headquarters in New York City, representing UNESCO in the UN General Assembly, ECOSOC and the Security Council. He was then UNESCO's Coordinator for Crisis Response, overseeing humanitarian and development operations in South Sudan, Libya, Syria, Iran and Palestine. He was a member of cabinet of UNESCO Director-General Irina Bokova at the time when she was a candidate for the position of UN Secretary-General. Falatar was also in charge with relations with Israel and Palestine. Over a ten-year period, he advised five Presidents of UNESCO's General Conference.

After the election campaign, Falatar joined the Organization for Security and Co-operation in Europe (OSCE), and served as Head of Kyiv office of the Special Monitoring Mission to Ukraine for three years until the 2022 Russian invasion of Ukraine. He then joined the European Commission in 2023, where he is a member of the cabinet of Hadja Lahbib, European Commissioner for Preparedness and Crisis Management.

== 2018 election campaign ==
After announcing his candidacy for the Croat seat in the Presidency of Bosnia and Herzegovina on 21 April 2018, Falatar started a listening campaign across the country, meeting with people from different economic, social and ethnic backgrounds. He called his approach "Open hands politics", using the imagery from the medieval Bosnian monuments stećci.

Falatar campaigned as a pro-European socio-liberal candidate, whose foreign policy priorities were EU membership, strong regional relations with neighbouring countries, and economic diplomacy with major economic powers. During his campaign, he visited the European Parliament, and was supported by the Alliance of Liberals and Democrats for Europe.

Falatar came fourth in the election which took place on 7 October 2018. Although he was not elected, the visibility of the Falatar campaign helped Our Party (NS) to quadruple its number of votes, and quadruple its number of elected parliamentary representatives compared to previous elections. As a result, NS formed a coalition government in Sarajevo Canton on 26 December 2018, appointing a Prime Minister and two ministers.

Following the election, Falatar continued campaigning for political reform in Bosnia and Herzegovina, and its closer integration in Europe.
