= Sarajevo Canton Representation in Brussels =

Sarajevo Canton
- Flag Coat of arms

- Location of the Sarajevo Canton
- Country: Bosnia and Herzegovina
- Entity: Federation of Bosnia and Herzegovina
- Website: http://www.kanton-sarajevo.eu

Sarajevo Canton Regional Representation in Brussels is a member of Assembly of European Regions and has a mission to promote and lobby political, economic and business interests of Sarajevo Canton toward the European institutions and among other regions and private stake holders. The Representation Office in Brussels was founded in 2007. Its goal is development and improvement of international cooperation of Sarajevo Canton with European Regions and cities as well with the various European associations with the objective of enhancing of the policy of the interregional, cross border cooperation of Sarajevo Canton.

== The Office ==
The Representation Office in Rue du Commerce 49, 1000 Brussels, in the same building as three other regional representations: Istria, Friuli-Venezia Giulia and Carinthia.

== Head of the Representation ==
Dino Elezović has been the representative of Sarajevo Canton in Brussels since 2007.

== The activities ==
The office's activities focus on advocacy, strengthening connections with EU institutions, and supporting regional development projects.

In 2012, on the occasion of the Open Days of the 10th European Week of Regions and Cities in Brussels, Sarajevo Canton and the Slovenian MEP Jelko Kacin hosted a political round table named "The perspectives of Croatian Accession to the EU for the future of EU integration process and regional co-operation".
