= Nihad Uk =

Bosnian politician (born 1989)

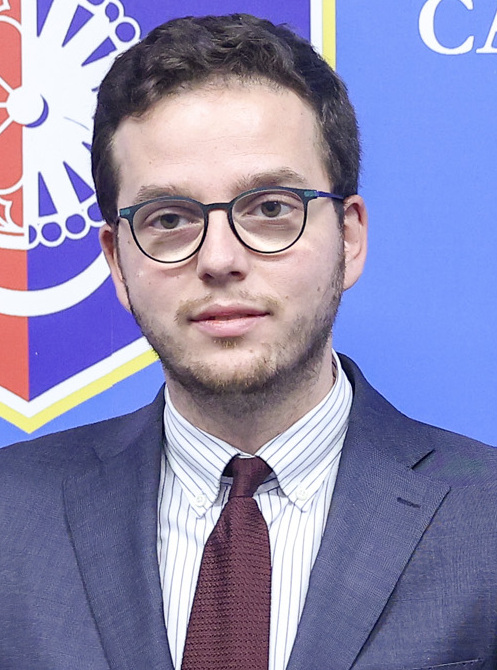
- Uk in 2023

Prime Minister of Sarajevo Canton
- Incumbent
- Assumed office 24 March 2023
- Preceded by: Darja Softić-Kadenić (acting)
Parliamentary offices
Member of the Federal House of Peoples
In office
17 January 2023 – 24 March 2023

Personal details
- Born: 10 July 1989 (age 37) Sarajevo, SR Bosnia and Herzegovina, SFR Yugoslavia
- Party: Our Party
- Spouse: Ajla Uk
- Children: 1
- Education: University of Sarajevo (LLB, LLM)

Nihad Uk (born 10 July 1989) is a Bosnian politician who has served as Prime Minister of Sarajevo Canton since March 2023. He previously served as member of the Federal House of Peoples from January to March 2023. He is a member of Our Party, and was its secretary general between 2017 and 2023.

Taking office at the age of 33, he is the youngest person to serve as Sarajevo Canton prime minister.

== Early life and education ==
Uk was born in Sarajevo. He graduated from the Faculty of Law of the University of Sarajevo in 2013, and earned a master's degree in international law at the same faculty in 2017. From 2013 to 2014, he worked as a legal trainee at the "Home for Children Without Parental Care of Sarajevo Canton." From 2015 to 2016, he was an associate in public procurement at the R&S d.o.o. company.

== Political career ==
In the 2016 municipal elections, Uk was elected councilor of Our Party in the municipal council of Centar Sarajevo, and was also delegated to the Sarajevo City Council. From 2017 to 2023, he was also the secretary general of Our Party.

In the 2022 general election, Uk was elected to the Sarajevo Canton Assembly, and then in January 2023 he was also delegated to the Federal House of Peoples. When Our Party leader Edin Forto resigned as Prime Minister of Sarajevo Canton to serve as the new Minister of Communication and Traffic in the Council of Ministers following the October 2022 election, Darja Softić-Kadenić was appointed as acting prime minister in January 2023. After successful coalition negotiations, Uk eventually succeeded Softić-Kadenić as prime minister with the formation of a new Cantonal government on 24 March 2023. Following a tram derailment in Sarajevo on 12 February 2026 that killed one person and injured four others, as well as ensuing protests, Uk resigned on 15 February. He will remain in office until a new prime minister is appointed.

== Personal life ==
Nihad is married to Ajla Uk and together they have a daughter. They live in Sarajevo.
