= Edin Forto =

Bosnian politician (born 1972)

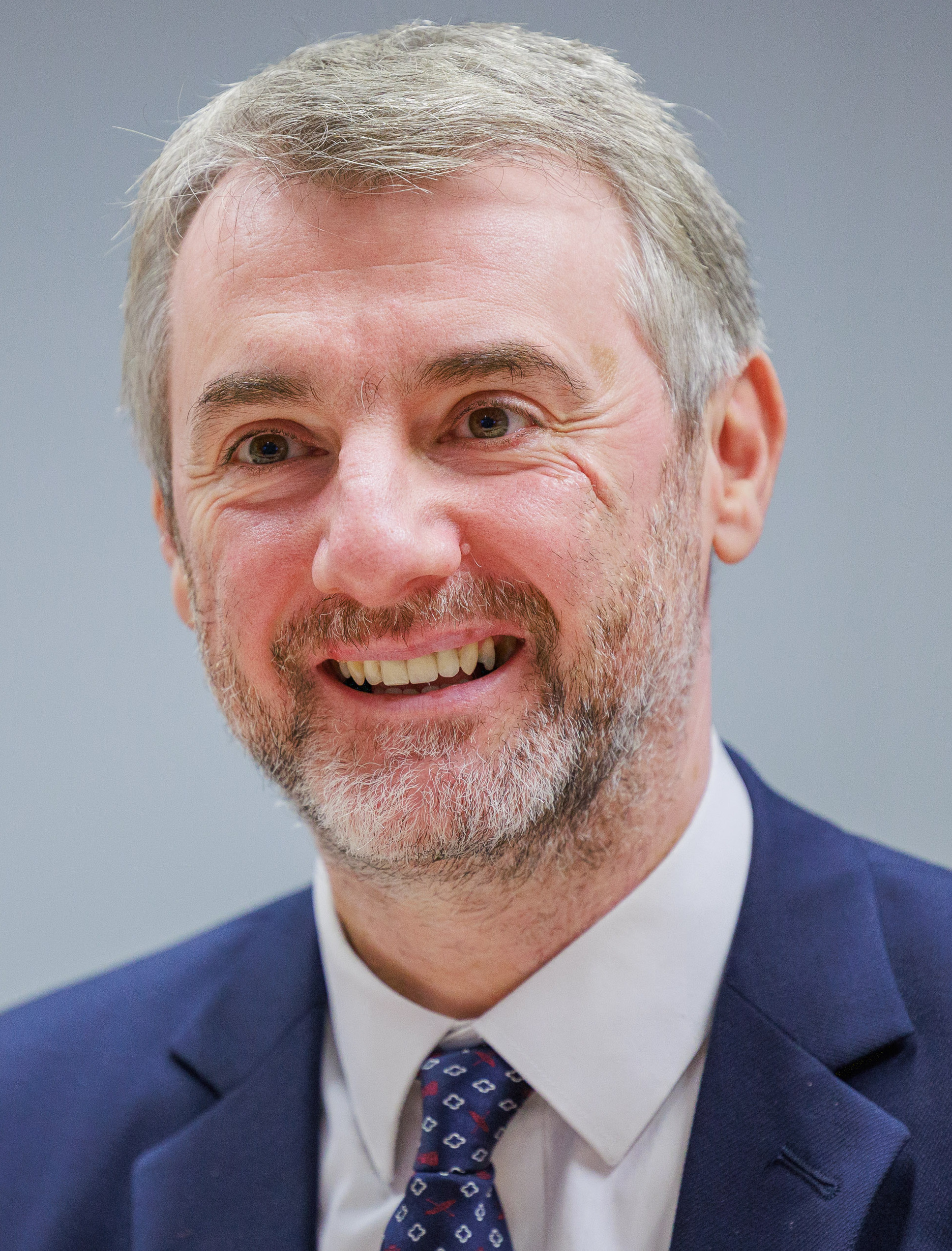
- Forto in 2023

Minister of Communication and Traffic
- Incumbent
- Assumed office 25 January 2023
- Prime Minister: Borjana Krišto
- Preceded by: Vojin Mitrović

Prime Minister of Sarajevo Canton
- In office 5 January 2021 – 25 January 2023
- Preceded by: Mario Nenadić
- Succeeded by: Darja Softić-Kadenić (acting); Nihad Uk
- In office 26 December 2018 – 3 March 2020
- Preceded by: Adem Zolj
- Succeeded by: Mario Nenadić
Parliamentary offices
Member of the Federal House of Peoples
In office
15 January 2015 – 26 December 2018
Additional positions
President of Our Party
In office 4 September 2021 – 11 October 2025
Preceded by	Predrag Kojović
Succeeded by	Sabina Ćudić

Personal details
- Born: 16 August 1972 (age 54) Sarajevo, SR Bosnia and Herzegovina, SFR Yugoslavia
- Party: Our Party (since 2009)
- Spouse: Emina Šehagić (m. 2014)
- Children: 2
- Education: UNC-Chapel Hill (BA); Columbia University (MIA)

Edin Forto (born 16 August 1972) is a Bosnian politician who has served as the Minister of Communication and Traffic since January 2023. He previously served as Prime Minister of Sarajevo Canton from 2018 to 2020 and again from 2021 to 2023. He was president of Our Party from 2021 to 2025.

Born in Sarajevo in 1972, Forto worked as an amateur journalist during the Bosnian War. He later graduated from UNC-Chapel Hill, and earned a master's degree from Columbia University in 2001. He worked at Eurasia Group, before returning to Sarajevo and working in executive positions in a number of companies.

A member of Our Party since 2009, Forto was elected to the Sarajevo Canton Assembly in the 2014 general election, serving until 2018. He was simultaneously a member of the Federal House of Peoples from 2015 to 2018. In September 2021, he was elected president of Our Party for a four-year term. Following the 2022 general election, Forto was appointed Minister of Communication and Traffic in the Fourteenth Council of Ministers of Bosnia and Herzegovina.

== Early career ==
Forto was born in Sarajevo on 16 August 1972, where he graduated from the Second Gymnasium in 1991. During the Bosnian War from 1992 to 1995, he worked as an amateur journalist, editor, and DJ for several creative and media outlets, including Obala Art Center, Radio ZID, Radio 202, and Dani magazine.

Following the Bosnian War, Forto moved to North Carolina, United States in September 1995. He studied at the University of North Carolina at Chapel Hill, earning a Bachelor of Arts in Media and Journalism in 1999. In 2001, he completed a master's degree in international affairs at Columbia University in New York City.

After completing his studies, Forto worked for two years at Eurasia Group, a political consultancy based in New York City. In 2003, he returned to Sarajevo, where he became deputy director of the construction company Put, a position he held until 2005. He then worked as an economist at Sarajevska pivara until 2006, after which he once again served as deputy director of Put from 2006 to 2008. Following this role, he was appointed director of Put Aggregates and Concrete Ltd., where he remained until 2013. From 2013 until 2015, he was the director of the Sarajevo branch of Nexe Group, a Croatian industrial company specializing in construction materials.

== Political career ==
Forto joined Our Party in 2009. He became a member of the Federal House of Peoples, the upper chamber of the Parliament of the Federation of Bosnia and Herzegovina, following the 2014 general election. He was also elected to the Sarajevo Canton Assembly in the election.

Forto was appointed Prime Minister of Sarajevo Canton on 26 December 2018 and served until 3 March 2020, when his government was ousted by the Party of Democratic Action (SDA), the Democratic Front and the Union for a Better Future. Following the 2020 municipal elections and a loss in confidence in the SDA-led government, Forto was once again appointed as the prime minister, taking office on 5 January 2021. On 4 September 2021, he became the new president of Our Party, succeeding Predrag Kojović, who had resigned earlier that year.

After the 2022 general election and the formation of a new Council of Ministers of Bosnia and Herzegovina, headed by Borjana Krišto, Forto was appointed Minister of Communication and Traffic on 25 January 2023. At Our Party's congress, held on 11 October 2025, he was succeeded as party leader by Sabina Ćudić.

== Personal life ==
Forto lives in Sarajevo. He married Emina Šehagić in 2014, and the couple has two children, Emir and Naida.

On 9 September 2021, Forto underwent a successful surgical procedure in Albania to treat inflammation of a cervical spine nerve, a condition he had been diagnosed with the previous month at a hospital in Sarajevo.

Political offices
Preceded by Vojin Mitrović	Minister of Communication and Traffic; 2023–present	Incumbent
