= Faruk Selmanović =

Bosnian politician (born 1987)

Member of the Sarajevo Canton Assembly
- Incumbent
- Assumed office 11 November 2022

Personal details
- Born: 1987 Sarajevo, SR Bosnia and Herzegovina, SFR Yugoslavia
- Party: Party of Democratic Action (2004–present)
- Children: 3
- Education: Sarajevo School of Science and Technology (BSc CIS), Buckingham University (MSIS)
- Website: farukselmanovic.com

Faruk Selmanović (born 1987) is a Bosnian politician and information systems specialist serving as member of the Sarajevo Canton Assembly.

Selmanović was born in Sarajevo, Bosnia and Herzegovina. He holds a Bachelor’s degree in Information Systems Engineering with a specialization in Economics from the Sarajevo School of Science and Technology. He later obtained a Master’s degree in Information Systems from Buckingham University.

Selmanović has been actively involved in public service. He serves as a member of the Sarajevo Canton Assembly and has been involved in various community initiatives. His work in information systems has focused on the application of technology in public administration and economic development.

Selmanović is married and has three children. He is an ethnic Bosniak.
