= 2026 Sarajevo tram derailment =

2026 fatal derailment in Sarajevo, Bosnia and Herzegovina

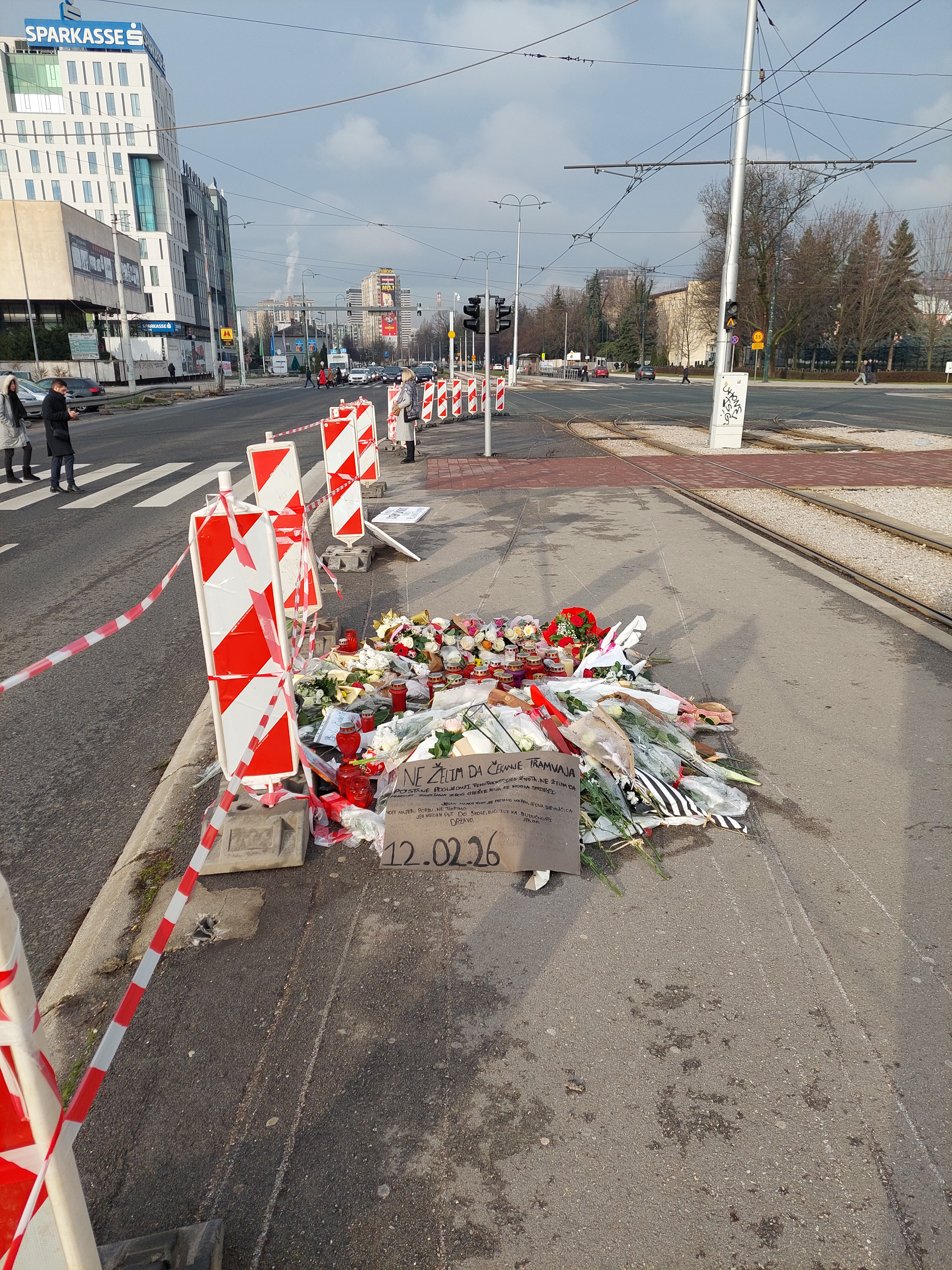
- Location of the tram derailment at tram stop "Muzeji" with visible markings left by tram wheels after derailment and flowers placed in memory of one dead student

Details
- Date: 12 February 2026; 8 months ago c. 12:00 p.m. CET
- Location: Tram stop "Muzeji" (eng. "Museums") near the National Museum and Historical Museum, Sarajevo
- Country: Bosnia and Herzegovina
- Operator: KJKP Gras
- Cause: Unknown; possible brake failure

Statistics
- Trains: 1 tram (2 carriages)
- Deaths: 1
- Injured: 4

On 12 February 2026, a tram derailed at tram stop "Muzeji" (eng. "Museums") in front of the National Museum in Sarajevo, Bosnia and Herzegovina, severely damaging the tram station and sliding onto the main road (Zmaja od Bosne Street). One person died, along with four others injured. This was one of the worst tram incidents in Bosnia and Herzegovina.

== Accident ==
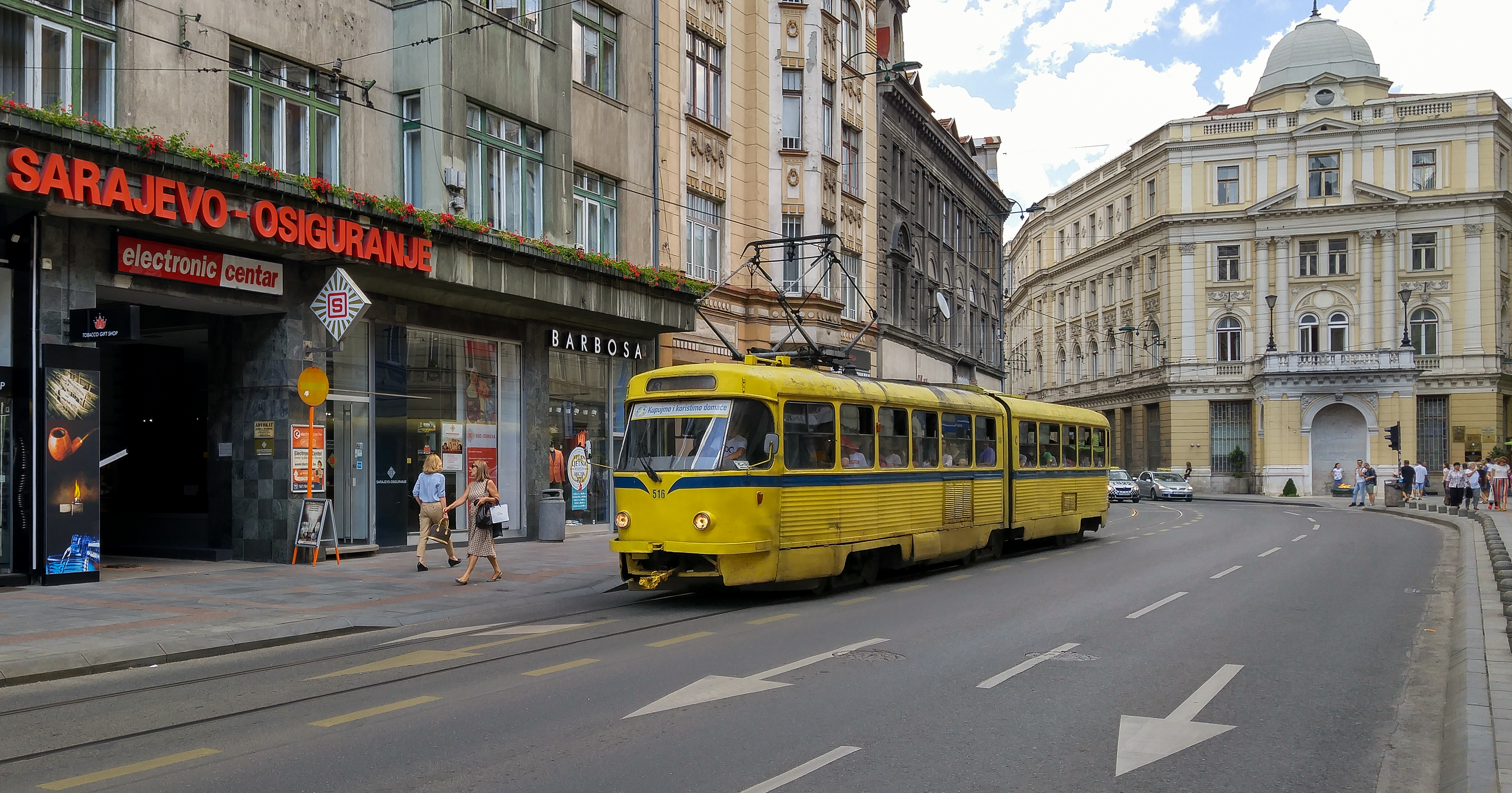
Tatra K2YU tram (fleet number 516) involved in this derailment, pictured in 2018

The tram which derailed was a Tatra K2YU model, fleet number 516 (old fleet number 231), produced in 1975. The tram left Sarajevo railway station en route to Baščaršija on Route 1. As it approached the intersection, where a section of the Sarajevo tram system branches off to the railway station, it was under manual operation to slow the tram down, as it was considered a sharp turn, and could lead to accidents. However, when the operator began braking, it malfunctioned, keeping the tram at almost full speed in such a sharp turn. The tram most likely derailed from the switch track, which was designed for low-speed operation, and after it derailed, it kept sliding towards the nearby tram station, crushing at least three people, with one of them dying. The tram station was severely damaged, while the tram itself slid onto the main road and hit a car, where it stopped, and a nearby ambulance responded immediately.

== Aftermath ==
Immediately after the derailment, a section of the Zmaja od Bosne Street was shut off to all traffic, to assess the damages and safely clear the area of any debris from the accident. The next day, an official investigation was launched by the Ministry of Interior of the Sarajevo Canton to investigate what caused the derailment. The tram driver was also arrested and held in custody in the Ministry of Interior, as the driver is facing charges relating to public security threat, gross negligence and negligent endangerment causing death. The same day as the driver was arrested, a large group of university students, and people who knew the victim, held a vigil to honor him.

On 13 February, citizens went out on the streets to express solidarity and pay tribute to the 23-year-old student who was killed in the accident, and to also show support to the 17-year-old girl who was still in critical condition. The following day, on 14 February, several thousand of citizens gathered in front of the National Museum, blocking the streets in protest; the protest lasted over three hours and the main route in Sarajevo was blocked by the protesters.

The third day of the protests took place on 15 February, where protesters demanded the release of the tram driver from custody. Amid ensuing protests, Sarajevo Canton prime minister Nihad Uk resigned. Subsequently, the driver was released from custody. On 16 February, the protests continued for the fourth day. The protesters sought deeper investigations into the operator, KJKP Gras, while its director Senad Mujagić resigned.
