= Sabina Ćudić =

Bosnian politician (born 1982)

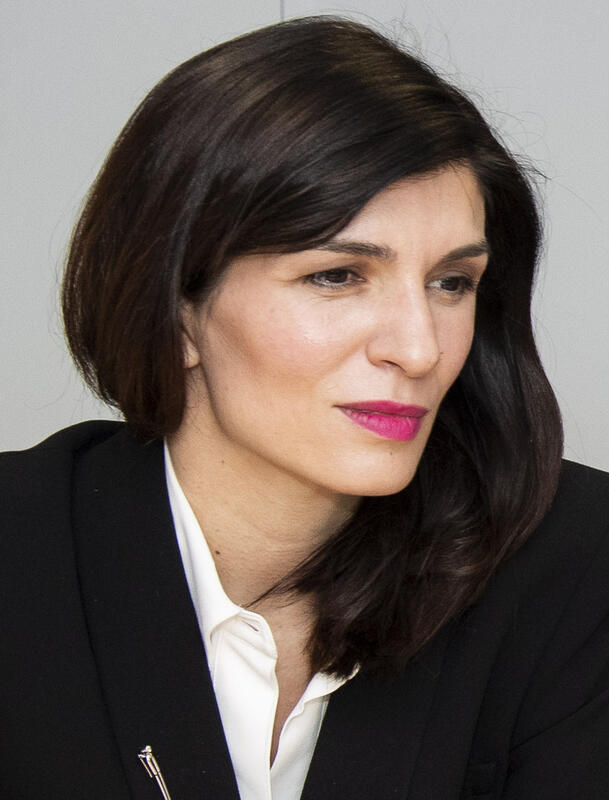
- Ćudić in 2024

Member of the House of Representatives
- Incumbent
- Assumed office 1 December 2022
- Constituency: 3rd Electoral Unit FBiH
Parliamentary offices
Member of the Federal House of Representatives
In office
27 November 2018 – 1 December 2022
Additional positions
President of Our Party
In office 11 October 2025 – 14 November 2026
Preceded by	Edin Forto
Succeeded by	Behija Kulović (acting)

Personal details
- Born: 17 April 1982 (age 44) Sarajevo, SR Bosnia and Herzegovina, SFR Yugoslavia
- Party: Our Party (since 2012)
- Spouse: Alban Ukaj (m. 2014)
- Children: 1
- Education: Towson University (BA); University of Bologna (MA); University of Sarajevo (MA)

Sabina Ćudić (born 17 April 1982) is a Bosnian politician who has served as a member of the House of Representatives of Bosnia and Herzegovina since December 2022. She previously served as a member of the House of Representatives of the Federation of Bosnia and Herzegovina from 2018 to 2022. From October 2025 to November 2026, she had been the president of Our Party.

== Early life and education ==
Ćudić was born in Sarajevo in 1982. During the Bosnian War, she fled with her family to the United States, where she completed her secondary education, graduating from Skyline High School in Idaho Falls. She earned a bachelor’s degree in political science and international studies from Towson University in 2005. She later completed a master’s degree in human rights and democracy, jointly awarded by the University of Bologna and the University of Sarajevo.

From 2005 to 2013, Ćudić worked at the Faculty of Political Sciences and International Relations at the Sarajevo School of Science and Technology, where she served as a teaching assistant and later as a senior teaching assistant in political science.

== Political career ==
Ćudić joined the social-liberal Our Party in 2012 and later served as its vice-president. In the same year, she ran unsuccessfully for mayor of Novo Sarajevo in the 2012 municipal elections.

She was elected to the Sarajevo Canton Assembly in the 2014 general election. In the 2018 general election, she was elected to the Federal House of Representatives, where she served until 2022.

In the 2022 general election, Ćudić was elected to the national House of Representatives, receiving more than 20,000 votes. Since March 2023, she has also been a member of the Parliamentary Assembly of the Council of Europe.

In January 2025, acting on Ćudić’s initiative, Nebojša Radmanović of the Alliance of Independent Social Democrats (SNSD) was removed from the collegium of the national House of Representatives. In February 2025, the liberal alliance Troika, in cooperation with opposition parties from Republika Srpska, appointed Darko Babalj of the Serb Democratic Party as Radmanović’s replacement.

Ćudić announced her candidacy for president of Our Party in September 2025, ahead of the party congress held on 11 October 2025. At the congress, she was unanimously elected party leader, succeeding Edin Forto. She was re-elected to the national House of Representatives in the 2026 general election, but announced her resignation as Our Party president on 10 October 2026, citing party's poor electoral performance. She remained in the role until 14 November 2026, when Behija Kulović was appointed acting president ahead of the party congress scheduled for 20 March 2027.

== Personal life ==
Ćudić married Kosovo-Albanian actor Alban Ukaj at New York City Hall in New York on 10 April 2014. Their child, a boy named Nardis, was born in August 2015.
