= Our Party (Bosnia and Herzegovina) =

Political party in Bosnia and Herzegovina

Our Party Naša stranka Наша странка
- Abbreviation: NS
- President: Behija Kulović (acting)
- General Secretary: Ćamil Osmanagić
- Vice Presidents: See list: Vildana Bešlija Alen Girt
- Founders: Danis Tanović; Dino Mustafić
- Founded: 5 April 2008; 18 years ago
- Merger of: Liberal Democratic Party
- Headquarters: Branilaca Sarajeva 5, Sarajevo
- Youth wing: Our Youth
- Ideology: Liberalism; Social liberalism; Economic liberalism; Secularism; Pro-Europeanism; Multiculturalism
- Political position: Centre to centre-left
- National affiliation: Troika (since 2020)
- Regional affiliation: Liberal South East; European Network
- European affiliation: Alliance of Liberals and Democrats for Europe
- Colours: Orange-red
- HoP BiH: 0 / 15
- HoR BiH: 1 / 42
- HoP FBiH: 4 / 80
- HoR FBiH: 4 / 98
- NA RS: 0 / 83
- Cantonal Heads: 1 / 10
- Mayors: 1 / 145

Website
- nasastranka.ba

Our Party (Bosnian, Croatian, and Serbian: Naša stranka/Наша странка, abbreviated NS) is a social-liberal and multi-ethnic political party in Bosnia and Herzegovina, founded in 2008. Its current leader is Sabina Ćudić. The party's founders are the Bosnian directors Danis Tanović and Dino Mustafić. The party aims to break the dominance of nationalist parties in the Bosnian political system. It is a member of the Alliance of Liberals and Democrats for Europe.

== Platform ==
Our Party is a social-liberal and multi-ethnic party that seeks greater inclusion of citizens in the decision-making process in Bosnia and Herzegovina. They are also pro-EU and pro-NATO.

Our Party also believes that collective rights should not have priority over individual rights and are against ethnically-based decision-making processes. They believe that the rights of the constituent peoples of Bosnia and Herzegovina should be clearly formulated and enumerated, and the party's belief is that the Constitutional Court should be the one protecting vital ethnic interests and not the national House of Peoples, which according to Our Party should be abolished.

The party does not agree with the concept of privatization at all costs, but rather believes that it should be done strategically and that public companies should be kept public if they are financially and economically viable.

Our Party states in their 2015 official party economic programme that they consider the cost of labour in Bosnia and Herzegovina to be too high. One of the party documents was called "Third Way", reflecting the party's strong support of neoliberal ideas, such as support for the free market, free trade, deregulation, privatisation, reduction of taxes for private companies, public-private partnerships, etc.

Our Party believes that small and medium-sized enterprises are essential for Bosnia and Herzegovina's economic development. According to the party's platform, taxes should be lowered in order to attract domestic and foreign investments.

The party is also for progressive taxation and differentiated VAT rates in order to make basic necessities cheaper. The party is also for the decrease of the enormous administration which according to them would significantly improve the country's economic situation.

The party believes, in contrast to the ethnic parties of Bosnia and Herzegovina, that the economy is the main integration mechanism.

== History ==
=== Foundation (2008–2010) ===
Our Party was founded on 5 April 2008 on the initiative of a group of citizens and public figures led by prominent film directors Danis Tanović and Dino Mustafić. None of them became president of the party, which is in contrast to most other leader-oriented parties that emerged in Bosnia and Herzegovina after the war. Instead, they became vice presidents, together with Maja Marjanović and Boris Divković, while Bojan Bajić was elected party president and Fadil Šero secretary-general. The unifying element for the founders of Our Party was the dissatisfaction with the political practices in Bosnia and Herzegovina at the time.

The first elections Our Party contested were the 2008 municipal elections, claiming their aim was to build the party infrastructure from below by building local organisations and dealing with real-life issues. They won 24 seats in different municipal assemblies and their candidate Hajder Ermin became the mayor of the municipality of Bosanski Petrovac.

=== 2010 elections and financial issues (2010–2012) ===
Following the 2010 general election, and relatively poor results – two seats in the Sarajevo Canton Assembly and one seat in the Federal House of Peoples, Dennis Gratz was elected as the party's new president.

One of the main problems the party had in the period 2008–2010 was its large local infrastructure which was financially unfeasible. After the new leadership took over, the party started massive reconstruction. They decided to pull from municipalities where they lacked much support and concentrate on those municipalities where they did have such as Sarajevo municipalities, as well as Gračanica, Vareš, Zenica, Tuzla and Doboj-Istok.

=== Electoral gains and first time in government (2014–2018) ===
The decision to concentrate on municipalities where they did have electoral success in the past proved to be successful, as Our Party doubled their number of votes and increased its seat number by one in the Sarajevo Canton Assembly. They also managed to win one seat in the Federal House of Representatives, and earned two seats in the Federal House of Peoples. After the 2014 electoral success, the party decided to once again expand their local organisations across Bosnia and Herzegovina.

On 16 May 2015, Predrag Kojović was elected president of the party.

On 4 June 2016, Our Party became a member of the Alliance of Liberals and Democrats for Europe. The 2016 municipal elections were held on 2 October. The party managed to significantly increase its share of votes in Sarajevo, becoming the second largest political party and the largest left leaning party in the city.

On 21 April 2018, Our Party announced the candidacy of Boriša Falatar in the Bosnian general election, running for Presidency member and representing the Croats. In the general election, held on 7 October 2018, he failed to get elected. However, the visibility of the Falatar campaign helped Our Party to quadruple its number of votes, and quadruple its number of elected parliamentary representatives compared to previous elections. As a result, the party formed a coalition government in the Sarajevo Canton on 26 December 2018, appointing a Prime Minister and two ministers.

=== Formation of Troika and further electoral success (2020–2024) ===
On the eve of the 2020 municipal elections, Our Party entered into a four-party liberal coalition alongside the Social Democratic Party, People and Justice and the Independent Bosnian-Herzegovinian List (NBL), colloquially known as the Four, and currently known as Troika following the NBL's exit. In the elections, the alliance made significant results in Sarajevo, winning in the municipalities of Centar, Novo Sarajevo, Stari Grad and Ilidža, as well as other major cities in the country. Our Party vice-president Srđan Mandić was elected municipal mayor of Centar.

In the 2022 general election, the party won two seats in the national House of Representatives and six seats in the Federal one. Following the election, a coalition led by the Alliance of Independent Social Democrats, the Croatian Democratic Union and the Social Democratic Party, including Our Party, reached an agreement on the formation of a new government. Party president Edin Forto was appointed as the new Minister of Communication and Traffic within the newly formed government in January 2023. Additionally, the party's general secretary, Nihad Uk, succeeded Forto as Sarajevo Canton prime minister with the formation of a new Cantonal government in March 2023.

Our Party repeated its electoral success in the 2024 municipal elections, as Srđan Mandić got re-elected as municipal mayor of Sarajevo's municipality Centar.

== List of presidents ==
#	Name (Born–Died)	Portrait	Term of Office		Note
1	Bojan Bajić (b. 1978)		5 April 2008	26 March 2011	
2	Dennis Gratz (b. 1978)		26 March 2011	16 May 2015	
3	Predrag Kojović (b. 1965)		16 May 2015	4 September 2021	
4	Edin Forto (b. 1972)		4 September 2021	11 October 2025	
5	Sabina Ćudić (b. 1982)		11 October 2025	14 November 2026	
-	Behija Kulović (b. 1979)		14 November 2026	present	acting

== Election results ==
=== Parliamentary Assembly of Bosnia and Herzegovina ===
Parliamentary Assembly of Bosnia and Herzegovina
Year	Leader	#	Popular vote	%	HoR	Seat change	HoP	Seat change	Government
2010 (Note: Run in coalition with New Socialist Party.)	Bojan Bajić	14th	19,435	1.18	0 / 42	New	0 / 15	New	Extra-parliamentary
2014	Dennis Gratz	18th	10,913	0.67	0 / 42	0	0 / 15	0	Extra-parliamentary
2018	Predrag Kojović	10th	48,401	2.92	2 / 42	▲2	0 / 15	0	Opposition
2022	Edin Forto	9th	49,481	3.12	2 / 42	0	0 / 15	0	Coalition
2026	Sabina Ćudić	12th	32,310	2.39	1 / 42	▼1	TBD	TBD	TBD

=== Parliament of the Federation of Bosnia and Herzegovina ===
Parliament of the Federation of Bosnia and Herzegovina
Year	Leader	#	Popular vote	%	HoR	Seat change	HoP	Seat change	Government
2010	Bojan Bajić	14th	23,222	2.32	0 / 98	New	1 / 58	New	Opposition
2014	Dennis Gratz	10th	15,248	1.54	1 / 98	▲1	2 / 58	▲1	Opposition
2018	Predrag Kojović	6th	50,947	5.09	6 / 98	▲5	3 / 58	▲1	Opposition
2022	Edin Forto	6th	50,815	5.21	6 / 98	Steady	4 / 80	▲1	Coalition
2026	Sabina Ćudić	8th	29,552	3.85	4 / 98	▼2	TBD	TBD	TBD

=== Presidency elections ===
Presidency of Bosnia and Herzegovina
Election year	#	Candidate	Votes	%	Representing	Note	Elected?
2018	4th	Boriša Falatar	16,036	3.74%	Croats	—	No
2022	1st	Denis Bećirović (Note: Member of the SDP BiH.)	330,238	57.37%	Bosniaks	Support	Yes
2022	3rd	Vojin Mijatović	38,655	6.09%	Serbs	Support	No
2026	1st	Denis Bećirović	215,615	38.12%	Bosniaks	Support	Yes

=== Cantonal elections ===
Cantonal election	Cantonal Assembly										
Cantonal election	Una-Sana	Posavina	Tuzla	Zenica-Doboj	Bosnian Podrinje Goražde	Central Bosnia	Herzegovina-Neretva	West Herzegovina	Sarajevo	Canton 10	Total won / Total contested
2010	0 / 30	0 / 21	0 / 35	0 / 35	0 / 25	0 / 30	0 / 30	0 / 23	2 / 35	0 / 25	2 / 289
2014	0 / 30	0 / 21	0 / 35	0 / 35	0 / 25	0 / 30	0 / 30	0 / 23	3 / 35	0 / 25	3 / 289
2018	1 / 30	0 / 21	2 / 35	1 / 35	1 / 25	0 / 30	0 / 30	0 / 23	5 / 35	0 / 25	10 / 289
2022	1 / 30	0 / 21	1 / 35	1 / 35	0 / 25	0 / 30	0 / 30	0 / 23	5 / 35	0 / 25	8 / 289
2026	0 / 30	0 / 21	2 / 35	1 / 35	0 / 25	0 / 30	0 / 30	0 / 23	3 / 35	0 / 25	6 / 289
