= Vojin Mitrović =

Bosnian Serb politician

Minister of Economy and Entrepreneurship of Republika Srpska
- Incumbent
- Assumed office 23 December 2022
- Prime Minister: Radovan Višković
- Preceded by: Vjekoslav Petričević

Minister of Communication and Traffic
- In office 23 December 2019 – 23 December 2022
- Prime Minister: Zoran Tegeltija
- Preceded by: Ismir Jusko
- Succeeded by: Edin Forto

Member of the House of Representatives of Bosnia and Herzegovina
- In office 2018–2022
- Constituency: 2nd Electoral Unit RS

Personal details
- Born: 27 April 1961 (age 65) Brodac Donji, Bijeljina, PR Bosnia and Herzegovina, FPR Yugoslavia
- Party: Alliance of Independent Social Democrats (2005–2012; 2014–present)
- Other political affiliations: National Democratic Movement (2014)
- Spouse: Nela Mitrović
- Children: 2
- Education: University of Novi Sad Faculty of Technical Sciences

Vojin Mitrović (Serbian Cyrillic: Војин Митровић; born 27 April 1961) is a Bosnian Serb politician serving as Minister of Economy and Entrepreneurship of Republika Srpska since December 2022. He previously served as Minister of Communication and Traffic from 2019 to 2022.

Mitrović was a member of the national House of Representatives and a member of the National Assembly of Republika Srpska. He is currently a member of the Alliance of Independent Social Democrats.

== Early life and education ==
Born in the village of Brodac Donji near Bijeljina, PR Bosnia and Herzegovina, FPR Yugoslavia on 27 April 1961, Mitrović graduated from the University of Novi Sad Faculty of Technical Sciences.

== Career ==
Mitrović became a member of the Alliance of Independent Social Democrats (SNSD) in 2005, but left the party in 2012. Two years later, before the 2014 general election, he became a member of the National Democratic Movement (NDP) and at that election in October, Mitrović won a seat in the National Assembly of Republika Srpska. A month after the election, he left the NDP and once again became a member of the SNSD. At the 2018 general election, he was elected to the national House of Representatives. He is currently a member of the party Presidency of the SNSD.

On 23 December 2019, Mitrović was appointed as Minister of Communication and Traffic in the government of Zoran Tegeltija. As minister, on 16 March 2021, he signed an agreement on cooperation in infrastructure and construction projects between Bosnia and Herzegovina and Turkey, which also referred to the construction of a highway from Bosnia and Herzegovina's capital Sarajevo to Serbia's capital Belgrade. Following his appointment as Minister of Economy and Entrepreneurship of Republika Srpska on 23 December 2022, Mitrović was relieved of his duty as minister in the Tegeltija cabinet.

== Personal life ==
Vojin is married to Nela Mitrović and together they have two children. They live in Bijeljina.

Political offices
Preceded by Ismir Jusko	Minister of Communication and Traffic; 2019–2022	Succeeded by Edin Forto
