= Dennis Gratz =

Bosnian lawyer and politician (born 1978)

Dennis Gratz Денис Грац

Member of the Federal House of Representatives
- Incumbent
- Assumed office 1 December 2022
- In office 17 November 2014 – 20 November 2018
Additional positions
President of Our Party
In office 26 March 2011 – 16 May 2015
Preceded by	Bojan Bajić
Succeeded by	Predrag Kojović

Personal details
- Born: Muhamed Gracić; 15 September 1978 (age 48) Sarajevo, SR Bosnia and Herzegovina, SFR Yugoslavia
- Party: Democratic Front (2022–present)
- Other political affiliations: Our Party (2008–2018)
- Education: University of Sarajevo (LL.B.); University of Hamburg (PhD)

Dennis Gratz (Serbo-Croatian Cyrillic: Денис Грац; born Muhamed Gracić (Serbo-Croatian Cyrillic: Мухамед Грацић); 15 September 1978) is a Bosnian lawyer and politician serving as member of the Federal House of Representatives since 2022, having previously served from 2014 to 2018.

Gratz is a member of the Democratic Front since 2022. Before joining the Democratic Front, he was a member and president of the social-liberal Our Party from 2008 until 2018.

== Personal life ==
Gratz lives in Sarajevo, Bosnia and Herzegovina.
