= List of heads of the Sarajevo Canton =

Prime Minister of Sarajevo Canton
- Premijer Kantona Sarajevo
- Coat of arms of Sarajevo Canton

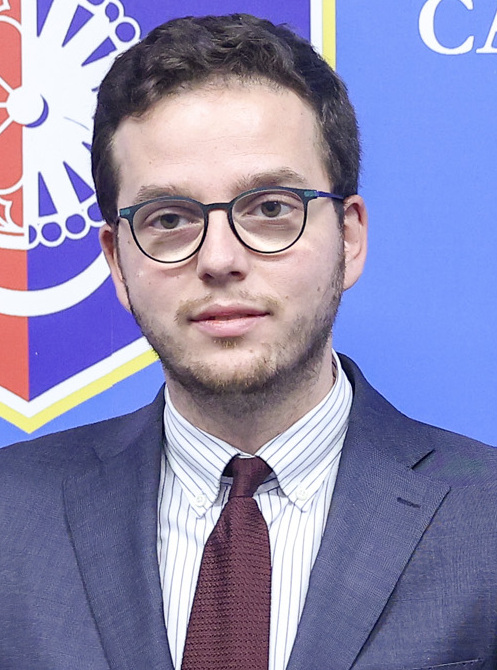
- Incumbent; Nihad Uk since 24 March 2023
- Appointer: Sarajevo Canton Assembly
- Inaugural holder: Sabira Hadžović (as governor); Ševkija Okerić (as prime minister)
- Formation: 11 March 1996
- Salary: 1,649 EUR per month

This article lists the heads of the Sarajevo Canton, the head of the Government of the Sarajevo Canton.

Until 2002, both the offices of governor and prime minister existed. However, the office of governor of the Sarajevo Canton was abolished and the office of prime minister was left as the sole office. The prime minister is appointed by the Sarajevo Canton Assembly. As head of the government, the prime minister has no authority for appointing ministers, and his role is that of a coordinator. Ministers are appointed in his or her stead by the majority-parties according to ethnic and entity representation rules, so that a deputy minister must not be of same ethnicity as the respective minister.

Nihad Uk is the 16th and current prime minister of the Sarajevo Canton. He took office on 24 March 2023, following the 2022 general election.

== Heads of the Sarajevo Canton (1996–present) ==
Party of Democratic Action
Party for Bosnia and Herzegovina
Social Democratic Party
People and Justice
Our Party
Union for a Better Future

=== Governors ===
№	Portrait	Name (Born–Died)	Term of Office		Party
1		Sabira Hadžović (1929–2019)	11 March 1996	30 October 1996	SDA
2		Midhat Haračić (1946–)	30 October 1996	27 May 1998	SDA
3		Mustafa Mujezinović (1954–2019)	27 May 1998	June 2000	SDA
4		Mirsad Kebo (1947–)	June 2000	25 January 2001	SDA
5		Mustafa Pamuk (1937–2017)	25 January 2001	6 October 2002	SDA

=== Prime Ministers ===
№	Portrait	Name (Born–Died)	Term of Office		Party
1		Ševkija Okerić (1956–)	11 March 1996	30 October 1996	SDA
2		Mustafa Mujezinović (1954–2019)	30 October 1996	12 November 1998	SDA
3		Beriz Belkić (1946–2023)	12 November 1998	15 February 2001	SBiH
4		Huso Hadžidedić (1940–)	15 February 2001	27 December 2001	SDP BiH
5		Nermin Pećanac (1958–)	27 December 2001	6 February 2003	SDP BiH
6		Denis Zvizdić (1964–)	6 February 2003	16 November 2006	SDA
7		Samir Silajdžić (1963–)	16 November 2006	19 November 2008	SBiH
—		Hajrudin Ibrahimović (1957–); Acting	19 November 2008	21 January 2009	SBiH
8		Besim Mehmedić (1955–)	21 January 2009	11 November 2010	SBiH
—		Zlatko Mešić; Acting	11 November 2010	13 January 2011	SBiH
9		Fikret Musić (1953–)	13 January 2011	21 November 2012	SDP BiH
10		Suad Zeljković (1960–)	21 November 2012	8 February 2014	SDA
11		Muhamed Kozadra (1957–)	8 February 2014	23 March 2015	SDA
12		Elmedin Konaković (1974–)	23 March 2015	4 April 2018	SDA (until February 2018)
		Elmedin Konaković (1974–)	23 March 2015	4 April 2018	NiP (from March 2018)
13		Adem Zolj (1964–)	4 April 2018	26 December 2018	SDA
14		Edin Forto (1972–)	26 December 2018	3 March 2020	NS
15		Mario Nenadić (1964–)	3 March 2020	5 January 2021	SBB
(14)		Edin Forto (1972–)	5 January 2021	25 January 2023	NS
—		Darja Softić-Kadenić (1982–); Acting	25 January 2023	24 March 2023	NS
16		Nihad Uk (1989–)	24 March 2023	Incumbent	NS

== See also ==
- Sarajevo Canton Assembly
- List of heads of cantons of the Federation of Bosnia and Herzegovina
