= Suad Zeljković =

Bosnian politician (born 1960)

Prime Minister of Sarajevo Canton
- In office 21 November 2012 – 8 February 2014
- Preceded by: Fikret Musić
- Succeeded by: Muhamed Kozadra

Personal details
- Born: 13 September 1960 (age 65) Sarajevo, PR Bosnia and Herzegovina, FPR Yugoslavia
- Party: Party of Democratic Action

Suad Zeljković (born 13 September 1960) is a Bosnian politician who served as Prime Minister of Sarajevo Canton, one of Bosnia and Herzegovina's ten cantons, until his forced resignation as a result of the countrywide anti-government riots in February 2014.

== Biography ==
Zeljković was the director of the public utility company Toplanama until November 2012 and began working at Energoinvest in 1985.

He speaks Bosnian, English and German.

=== 2014 riots and resignation ===
Zeljković was forced to resign as Prime Minister of Sarajevo Canton on the night of 8 February 2014, following days of the 2014 protests and riots throughout Bosnia and Herzegovina. He had served since 21 November 2012 and, like most Bosnian politicians, was accused of corruption by protesters. Zeljković was quoted as saying: "I have not gone out of fear, I do not want to be a doormat for your feet." He also said that the anti-government revolt in his country had "elements of a coup d'état." The New York Times stated that Zeljković angered citizens even more during the riots when he said that the people of Sarajevo were not justified in their dissatisfaction; "In Sarajevo, no one has reasons for unrest and actions like this," he told reporters on 6 February. "There is not a single unpaid salary, nor does any sector of society have reasons for dissatisfaction."
