= Behija Kulović =

Bosnian politician and professor

Behija Kulović (born 21 May 1979) is a Bosnian politician and professor, serving as acting president of Our Party, following the resignation of Sabina Ćudić in November 2026.

== Biography ==
Kulović was born on 21 May 1979, in Zenica, SR Bosnia and Herzegovina. She finished elementary school and gymnasium in Kakanj, later graduating from the Faculty of Humanities at the University of Sarajevo. Kulović works as a professor of Bosnian language and literature at the gymnasium in Kakanj.

She is a member of Our Party since 2016. Kulović served as member of the Kakanj Municipal Council from 2020 to 2022. She has served as a member of the Assembly of the Zenica-Doboj Canton since the 2022 general election, being reelected in 2026. Following the 2026 election and the party's poor electoral performance, Sabina Ćudić resigned as party president and Kulović was appointed acting president on 14 November 2026, until the party congress scheduled for 20 March 2027.
