= Ministry of Communications and Transport (Bosnia and Herzegovina) =

Government ministry of Bosnia and Herzegovina

Ministry of Communications and Transport of Bosnia and Herzegovina
- Ministarstvo komunikacija i prometa Bosne i Hercegovine; Министарство комуникација и саобраћајa Босне и Херцеговине

- Greece–Bosnia and Herzegovina Friendship Building, seat of the Ministry of Communications and Transport of Bosnia and Herzegovina

Department overview
- Formed: 2002
- Headquarters: Sarajevo
- Minister responsible: Edin Forto
- Website: mkt.gov.ba/en

The Ministry of Communications and Transport of Bosnia and Herzegovina (Serbo-Croatian: Ministarstvo komunikacija i prometa Bosne i Hercegovine / Министарство комуникација и саобраћајa Босне и Херцеговине) is the governmental department which oversees the communications and transport of Bosnia and Herzegovina.

== History ==
After the end of the Bosnian War in 1995, the 1996 Bosnian general election and the formation of the first post-war government in Bosnia and Herzegovina in 1997, the Ministry of Civil Affairs and Communication of Bosnia and Herzegovina began working with Spasoje Albijanić (SDS) at the head, which is the predecessor of today's Ministry of Communications and Transport of Bosnia and Herzegovina and Ministry of Civil Affairs of Bosnia and Herzegovina.

After the 2002 Bosnian general election and the formation of the new government of Bosnia and Herzegovina between the Party of Democratic Action (SDA), the Serbian Democratic Party (SDS) and the Croatian Democratic Union of Bosnia and Herzegovina (HDZ BiH), headed by Adnan Terzić (SDA), the Ministry of Civil Affairs and Communications of Bosnia and Herzegovina was divided into the Ministry of Communications and Transport of Bosnia and Herzegovina with Branko Dokić (PDP) becoming Minister and the Ministry of Civil Affairs of Bosnia and Herzegovina with Safet Halilović (SBiH) as Minister.

== Organization ==
The Ministry of Communications and Transport of Bosnia and Herzegovina consists of four sectors, one inspectorate, one directorate and one regulatory board.

- Sector for Legal and Financial Affairs
- Transport Sector
- Sector for transport infrastructure, project preparation and implementation
- Inspectorate
- Directorate of Civil Aviation of Bosnia and Herzegovina
- Regulatory Board of Rail transport in Bosnia and Herzegovina

== List of ministers ==
=== Ministers of Civil Affairs and Communication (1997–2002) ===
Political parties:
Serb Democratic Party (SDS)
Alliance of Independent Social Democrats (SNSD)
Socialist Party (SP)

No.	Portrait	Minister of Civil Affairs and Communication	Took office	Left office	Time in office	Party
1	Spasoje Albijanić	Spasoje Albijanić	3 January 1997	3 February 1999	2 years, 31 days	SDS
2	Marko Ašanin	Marko Ašanin (1955–2011)	3 February 1999	22 June 2000	1 year, 140 days	SNSD
3	Tihomir Gligorić	Tihomir Gligorić	22 June 2000	22 February 2001	245 days	SP
4	Svetozar Mihajlović	Svetozar Mihajlović (born 1949)	22 February 2001	23 December 2002	1 year, 304 days	SP

=== Ministers of Communications and Transport (2002–present) ===
Political parties:
Party of Democratic Progress (PDP)
Croatian Democratic Union 1990 (HDZ 1990)
Social Democratic Party (SDP BiH)
Democratic Front (DF)
Union for a Better Future of BiH (SBB BiH)
Alliance of Independent Social Democrats (SNSD)
Our Party (NS)

No.	Portrait	Minister of Communications and Transport	Took office	Left office	Time in office	Party
1	Branko Dokić	Branko Dokić (born 1949)	23 December 2002	11 January 2007	4 years, 19 days	PDP
2	Božo Ljubić	Božo Ljubić (born 1949)	11 January 2007	23 June 2009	2 years, 232 days	HDZ 1990
3	Rudo Vidović	Rudo Vidović (born 1958)	23 June 2009	12 January 2012	2 years, 203 days	HDZ 1990
4	Damir Hadžić	Damir Hadžić (born 1976)	12 January 2012	31 March 2015	3 years, 78 days	SDP BiH
5	Slavko Matanović	Slavko Matanović (born 1958)	31 March 2015	11 May 2016	1 year, 41 days	DF
6	Ismir Jusko	Ismir Jusko (born 1971)	11 May 2016	26 December 2018	2 years, 229 days	SBB
7	Vojin Mitrović	Vojin Mitrović (born 1961)	23 December 2019	23 December 2022	3 years, 0 days	SNSD
8	Edin Forto	Edin Forto (born 1972)	25 January 2023	Incumbent	3 years, 281 days	NS
