= Coat of arms of Sarajevo Canton =

Seal of Sarajevo Canton

The coat of arms of Sarajevo Canton, generally known as the seal of Sarajevo Canton, is the coat of arms of the Sarajevo Canton in Bosnia and Herzegovina.

The official act of Sarajevo Canton describes the seal and flag of Sarajevo Canton, its adoption and usage. The seal is described as:

"The coat of arms of the Sarajevo Canton is form of shield, constructed symmetrically along the vertical axis. The shield in the lower two-thirds narrowing into spike. The frame of the shield is gold. The surface of the coat of arms is divided into two parts by vertical axis. Left half of the shield is in maroon (C0 M100 Y100 K40), and the right half is in blue (C40 M40 Y0 K60). In the central part of the shield is a central element – a combination of the knocker from Sarajevo Catholic Cathedral and the rosette from the Begova Mosque (Gazi Husrev-beg Mosque) gate, both halves in silver, which symbolize synthesis and encounter of two great civilizations, of East and West. Above the central element are nine gold stars, the symbols of the nine municipalities of Sarajevo Canton."

== See also ==
- Sarajevo
- Bosnia and Herzegovina
