= Sarajevo Canton Assembly =

Unicameral legislature of the Sarajevo Canton

Sarajevo Canton Assembly Skupština Kantona Sarajevo
- Coat of arms of Sarajevo Canton

Type
- Type: Unicameral

Leadership
- Speaker: Elvedin Okerić (NiP) since 7 December 2020

Structure
- Seats: 35
- Political groups: Government (16) SDP BiH (7) NiP (5) NS (4) Supported by (5) Independent (5) Opposition (14) SDA (7) DF–GS (4) SBiH (3)
- Length of term: 4 years

Elections
- Voting system: Proportional representation
- Last election: 2 October 2022

Meeting place
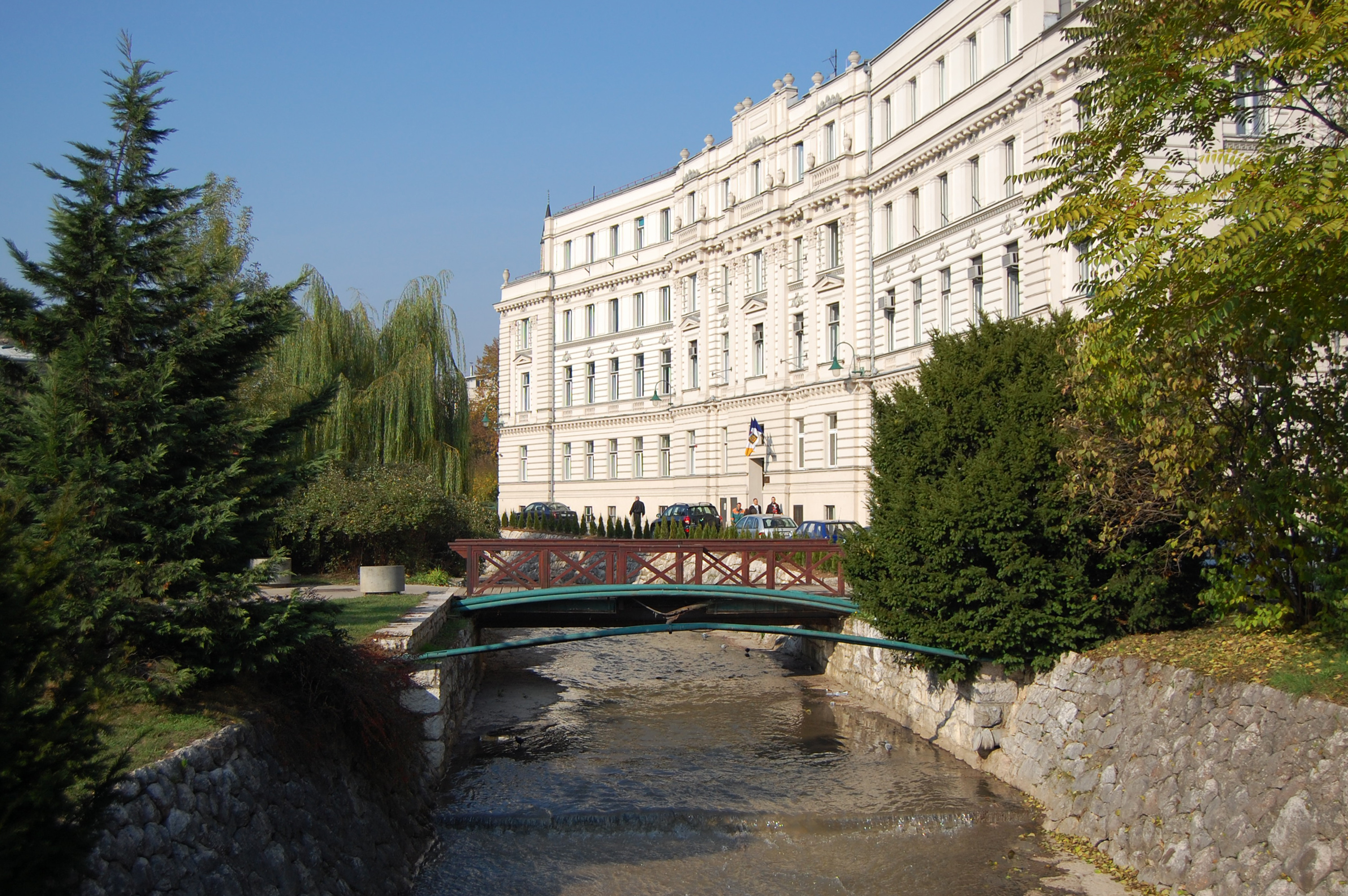
- Sarajevo Canton Building; Sarajevo, Bosnia and Herzegovina; 43°51′26.42″N 18°24′48.48″E

Website
- skupstina.ks.gov.ba

The Sarajevo Canton Assembly (Bosnian: Skupština Kantona Sarajevo) is the legislative body of the Sarajevo Canton, one of the ten cantons of the Federation of Bosnia and Herzegovina, within Bosnia and Herzegovina. The assembly is unicameral, and its number of members, 35, is determined in relation to the national structure of the population of the Sarajevo Canton.

== Electoral system ==
The assembly consists of 35 members which are elected by party-list proportional representation with open lists. Members of the Assembly are elected to a four-year term in general democratic and direct elections, by secret ballot, throughout the territory of the canton. Cantonal Assembly members are elected based on the number of votes won. Any resident of the canton may be elected as member of the assembly.

== Responsibilities ==
The Federal government and the canton are responsible, as legislative authorities, for:

1. guaranteeing and enforcing human rights;
2. healthcare;
3. human environment protection policy;
4. communication and transport infrastructure, in accordance with the Constitution of Bosnia and Herzegovina;
5. social policy;
6. implementing aws and other regulations on citizenship and travel documents of the citizens of Bosnia and Herzegovina from the territory of the Federation;
7. tourism;
8. use of natural resources.

Additionally, the Cantonal Assembly prepares and adopts the Cantonal Constitution by a two-thirds majority, enacts other regulations for the exercise of cantonal powers, adopts the Cantonal Budget, enacts laws on taxation and otherwise ensures the necessary financing. After elections, the assembly elects the Cantonal Government, the prime minister and ministers.

== Composition ==
| Party | Votes | % | Seats | +/– |
|---|---|---|---|---|
| SDA | 39,209 | 18.26 | 7 | -3 |
| NiP | 39,146 | 18.23 | 7 | +1 |
| SDP | 33,818 | 15.75 | 6 | +2 |
| SBiH | 27,619 | 12.86 | 5 | +5 |
| NS | 25,383 | 11.82 | 5 | 0 |
| DF–GS | 19,488 | 9.07 | 4 | +1 |
| ZNG | 8,194 | 3.82 | 1 | New |
| NES | 6,401 | 2.98 | – | 0 |
| SBB | 5,587 | 2.60 | – | -4 |
| Others | 9,933 | 4.62 | – | -3 |
| Total | 214,778 | 100.00 | 35 | – |
| Valid votes | 214,778 | 94.17 | | |
| Invalid votes | 8,929 | 3.91 | | |
| Blank votes | 4,376 | 1.92 | | |
| Total votes | 228,083 | 100.00 | | |
| Registered voters/turnout | 420,757 | 54.21 | | |
Source: CEC

== See also ==
- List of heads of the Sarajevo Canton
- Assemblies of the cantons of the Federation of Bosnia and Herzegovina
