= Sarajevo Canton =

Canton of the Federation of Bosnia and Herzegovina

Coordinates: 43°51′N 18°15′E

Sarajevo Canton Kanton Sarajevo (Bosnian) Sarajevska županija (Croatian) Сарајевски кантон (Serbian)
- Canton
- Flag Coat of arms

- Sarajevo Canton within Bosnia and Herzegovina
- Country: Bosnia and Herzegovina
- Entity: Federation of Bosnia and Herzegovina
- Established: 1995; 31 years ago
- Cantonal seat: Sarajevo
- Municipalities: 9 municipalities

Government
  - Prime Minister: Nihad Uk (NS)
  - Canton Assembly: 35 members

Area
  - Total: 1,276 km^{2} (493 sq mi)

Population (2013)
  - Total: 413,593
  - Density: 324.1/km^{2} (839.5/sq mi)
- Area code: 037
- ISO 3166 code: BA-09
- HDI (2023): 0.806 very high · (2nd)
- Website: vlada.ks.gov.ba

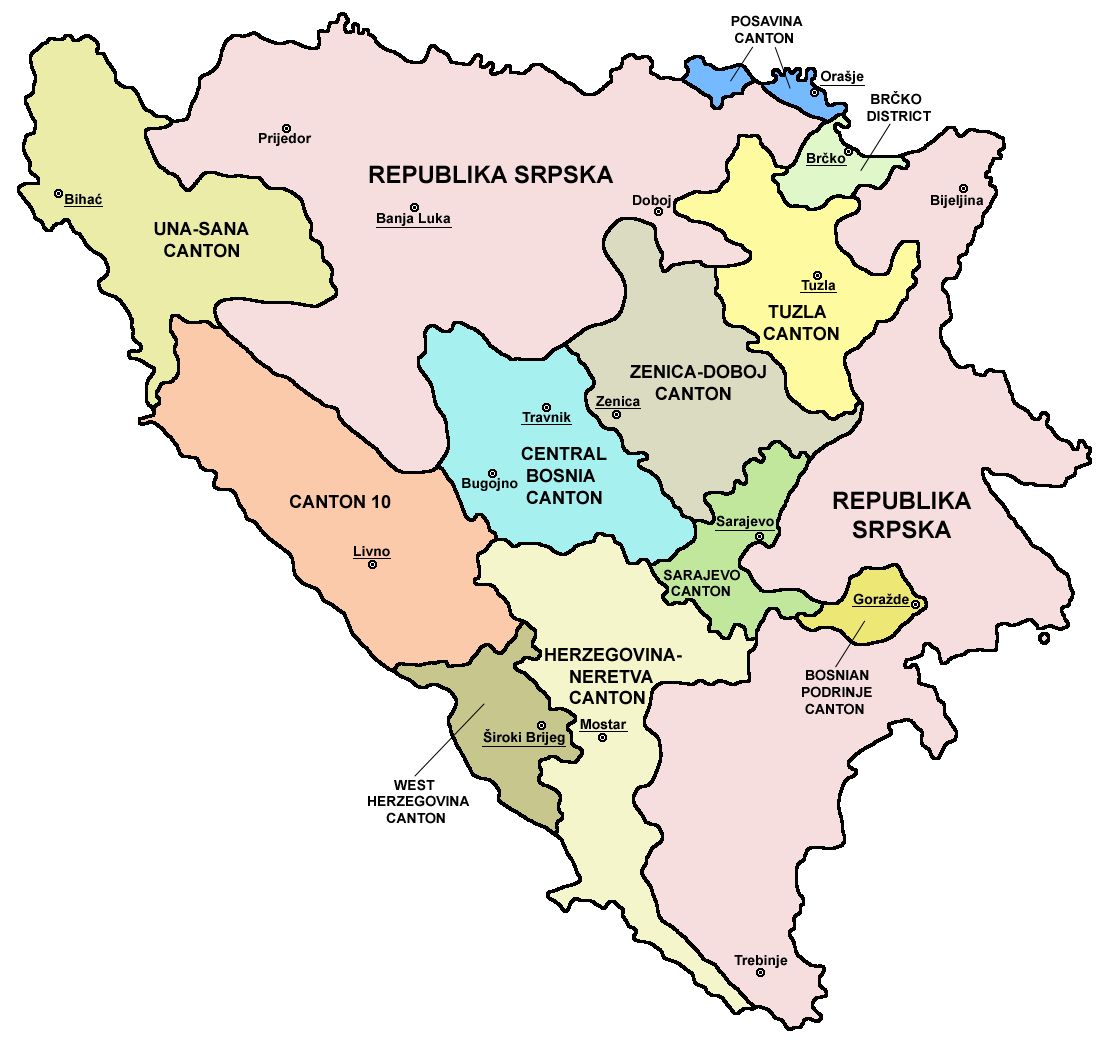
Cantons of the Federation of Bosnia and Herzegovina.

The Sarajevo Canton (Bosnian: Kanton Sarajevo; Croatian: Sarajevska županija; Serbian: Сарајевски кантон) is a federated state and one of the ten cantons of the Federation of Bosnia and Herzegovina in Bosnia and Herzegovina. Its cantonal seat is the city of Sarajevo, also the capital city of Bosnia and Herzegovina.

The canton is bordered by Republika Srpska to the north and east, Bosnian-Podrinje Canton Goražde to the southeast, Herzegovina-Neretva Canton to the south and southwest, and Central Bosnia Canton to the west.

The Canton represents the metro area of Sarajevo. It contains 97% of the city's population, but a much smaller percentage of the official land area. The majority of the population is Bosniak (83.8%).

== Municipalities ==
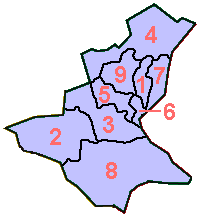
Map showing the municipalities within Sarajevo Canton. 1–Centar, 2–Hadžići, 3–Ilidža, 4–Ilijaš, 5–Novi Grad, 6–Novo Sarajevo, 7–Stari Grad, 8–Trnovo, 9–Vogošća

The Sarajevo Canton consists of 9 municipalities, of which 4 comprise the city of Sarajevo:

Municipality	Population (2013)	Area (km^{2})
Novi Grad, Sarajevo	118,553	47.31
Ilidža	66,730	136.77
Novo Sarajevo, Sarajevo	64,814	9.19
Centar, Sarajevo	55,181	32.92
Stari Grad, Sarajevo	36,976	49.69
Vogošća	26,343	71.69
Hadžići	23,891	272.86
Ilijaš	19,603	308.55
Trnovo	1,502	340.08
Total	413,593	1,269.05

== History ==
The history of Sarajevo dates back to Neolithic times, when the Butmir culture made its mountains and hills their home. In ancient times, the Sarajevo area (Canton) was occupied by the Illyrians. The local tribe, the Daesitates, controlled most of the area. They were a warlike bunch and the last Illyrian tribe to resist Roman rule, which finally came in AD 9. Under Roman rule, many roads were constructed in the region, as well as a city on top of modern-day Ilidža. During the Middle Ages, the area of Sarajevo Canton was a key part of the Bosnian Kingdom. The toponym Vrhbosna existed somewhere in the region and was one of the notable settlements at the time.

True development of the region came after the Ottoman conquest when local Muslim noble Isa-Beg Isaković established the roots of the modern city of Sarajevo, between 1461 and 1463. The region grew along with the city, which quickly, after Istanbul, became the most important in the Balkans. Later rule by Austria-Hungary modernized and westernized the region. Under Yugoslavia, there was major development of the area, which more than tripled in size. Because of its ideal geographical location in between mountains, Sarajevo was chosen to host the 1984 Winter Olympics. Much of this progress was offset however by the Yugoslav Wars in the early 1990s.

The Sarajevo Canton was a result of this warfare, created by the Washington Accords in 1994, and its boundaries defined by the Dayton Accords in 1995.

== Government ==
Like all Cantons of the Federation of Bosnia and Herzegovina, the head of the Sarajevo Canton is called the Prime Minister. The current Prime Minister is Nihad Uk, having served since 24 March 2023. Like many other heads of executive branches of government in the world, the Prime Minister has a cabinet which helps him go about his duties. The Sarajevo Canton also has ministries, services, and agencies to help in the running of the region.

The Canton is split into 9 municipalities. They are all based on the major settlements in their region, except for Sarajevo, whose size and status as capital city gives it four separate municipalities and its own separate city government. Major cities are in municipalities of the same name in Bosnia and Herzegovina (i.e. Ilidža is part of Ilidža Municipality) whose governments are the de facto city government as their jurisdiction covers the city and all major suburbs.

- Agencies of Sarajevo Canton
  - Agency for Cantonal Development
  - Agency for Reserves of Goods
  - Agency for Cantonal Information and Statistics
  - Agency for the Planning of Cantonal Growth
  - Professional Fire-Extinguishing Brigade

== Geography ==
The Sarajevo Canton has a typical Bosnian geography. It is located close to the geometric center of the country, and contains numerous mountains, including Bjelašnica, Igman, Jahorina, Trebević, and Treskavica. The cities of the Canton are built predominantly on the hills at the foot of these mountains, and the fields in between them. The most significant of these is the Sarajevo field, a small depression upon which the bulk of the city is built upon. The Miljacka river passes through the Canton. Vrelo Bosne, the source of the Bosna River, is found in Sarajevo Canton and is the source of water for most residents of Sarajevo.

== Economy ==
Sarajevo is economically strongest region in the whole of Bosnia and Herzegovina. The city and canton generate more than 37% of the Bosnian-Herzegovinian GDP.

The economy of Sarajevo Canton is slowly growing better, although it has been severely weakened by the Siege of Sarajevo and is still drastically weaker than it used to be during Yugoslav period. The employment rate in Bosnia and Herzegovina is 45.5% officially; however, grey economy may reduce actual unemployment to between 25 and 30%, while in Sarajevo the official unemployment rate is around 15% of the labour force.

Major industries in the region include tourism, food processing, manufacturing and IT. Several major Bosnian companies are based in the Canton such as Bosnalijek and Bosna Bank International. The area also holds the country footholds of numerous foreign corporations, such as Coca-Cola, Raiffeisen Bank International, Ziraat Bank, Al Jazeera, Volkswagen, among many others.

== Demographics ==
The Sarajevo Canton contains Sarajevo and its metro area. Since the city is the largest in Bosnia and Herzegovina, it is also one of the most populous Cantons of Bosnia and Herzegovina. According to the 2013 population census, the overall population of Sarajevo Canton is 413.593. 84% of population are ethnic Bosniaks, 4,2% Croats, and 3,2% Serbs.

The population density of Sarajevo Canton is some 350 people per km^{2}. 15.8% of the Canton's population are youth up to 14 years of age, 67.8% are between 15 and 64 years of age, and some 16.4% are over 65 years of age.

Of the nine municipalities, the biggest population belongs to Novi Grad, with some 125.626 residents, and the smallest population was in Trnovo, which has a mere 2.850 residents.

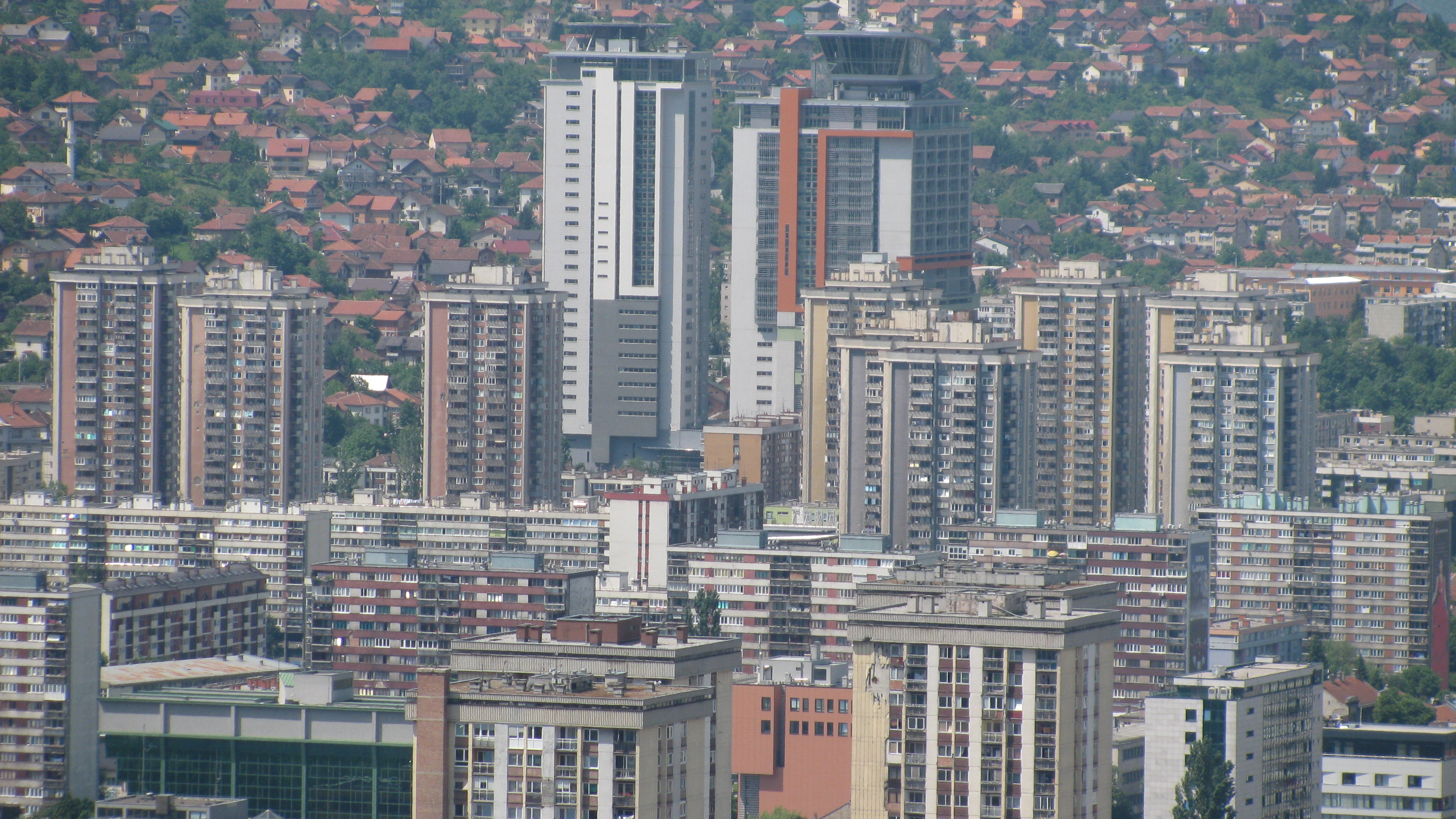
View on Bosmal City Center Towers

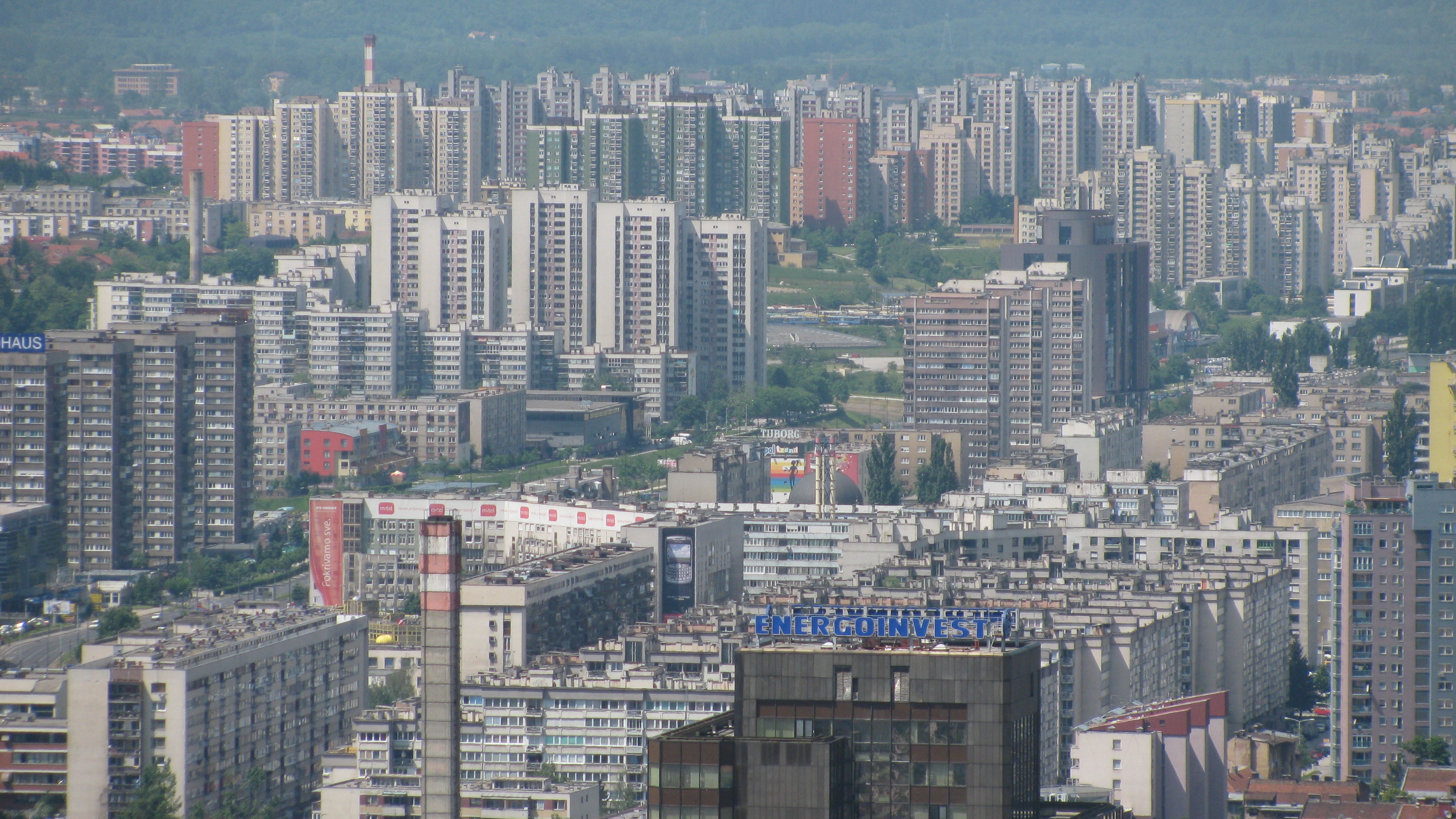
View on Novi Grad, Sarajevo

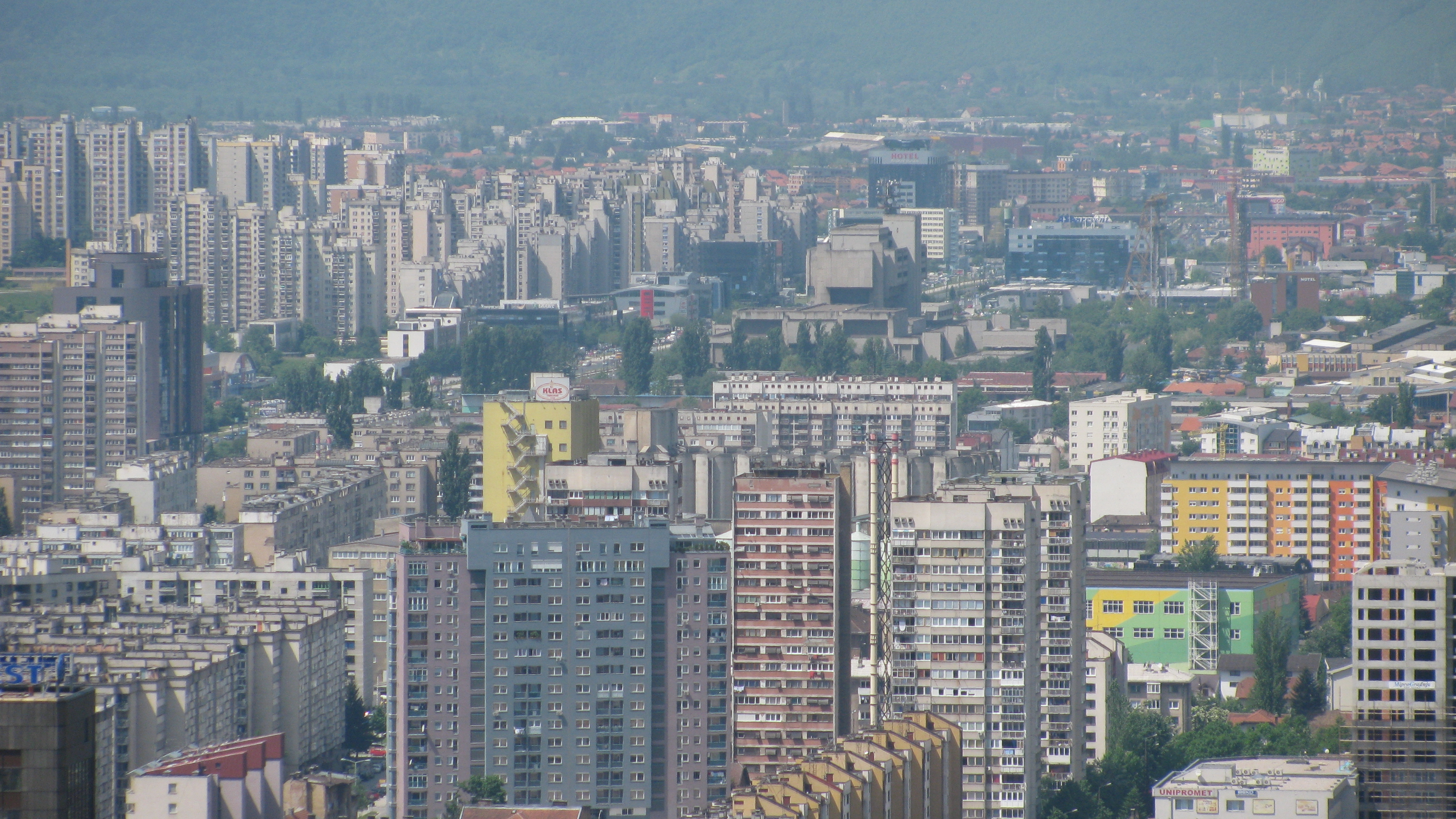
View towards BHRT Sarajevo

∗ 1961–1981 censuses

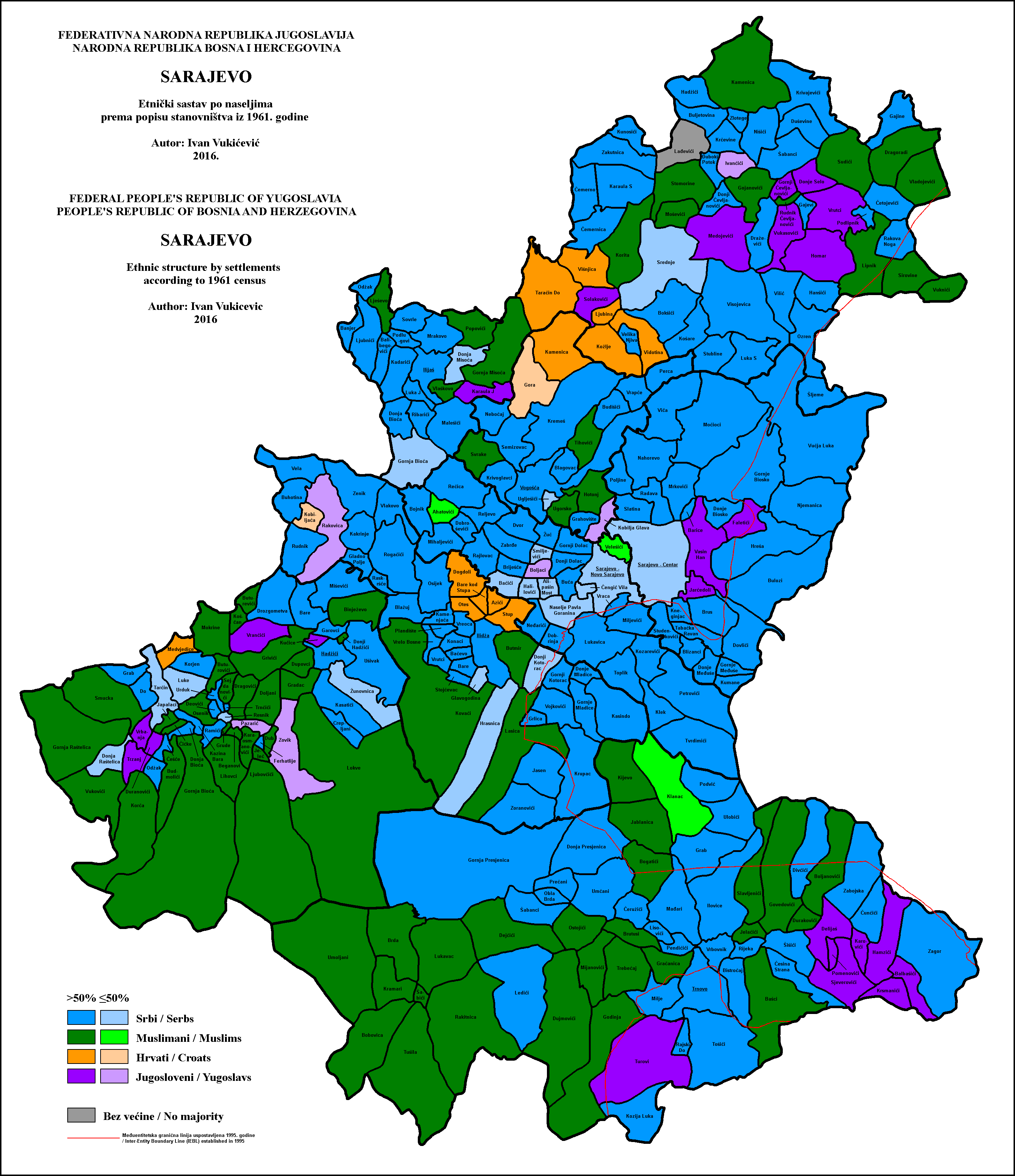
Ethnic structure of Sarajevo by settlements 1961

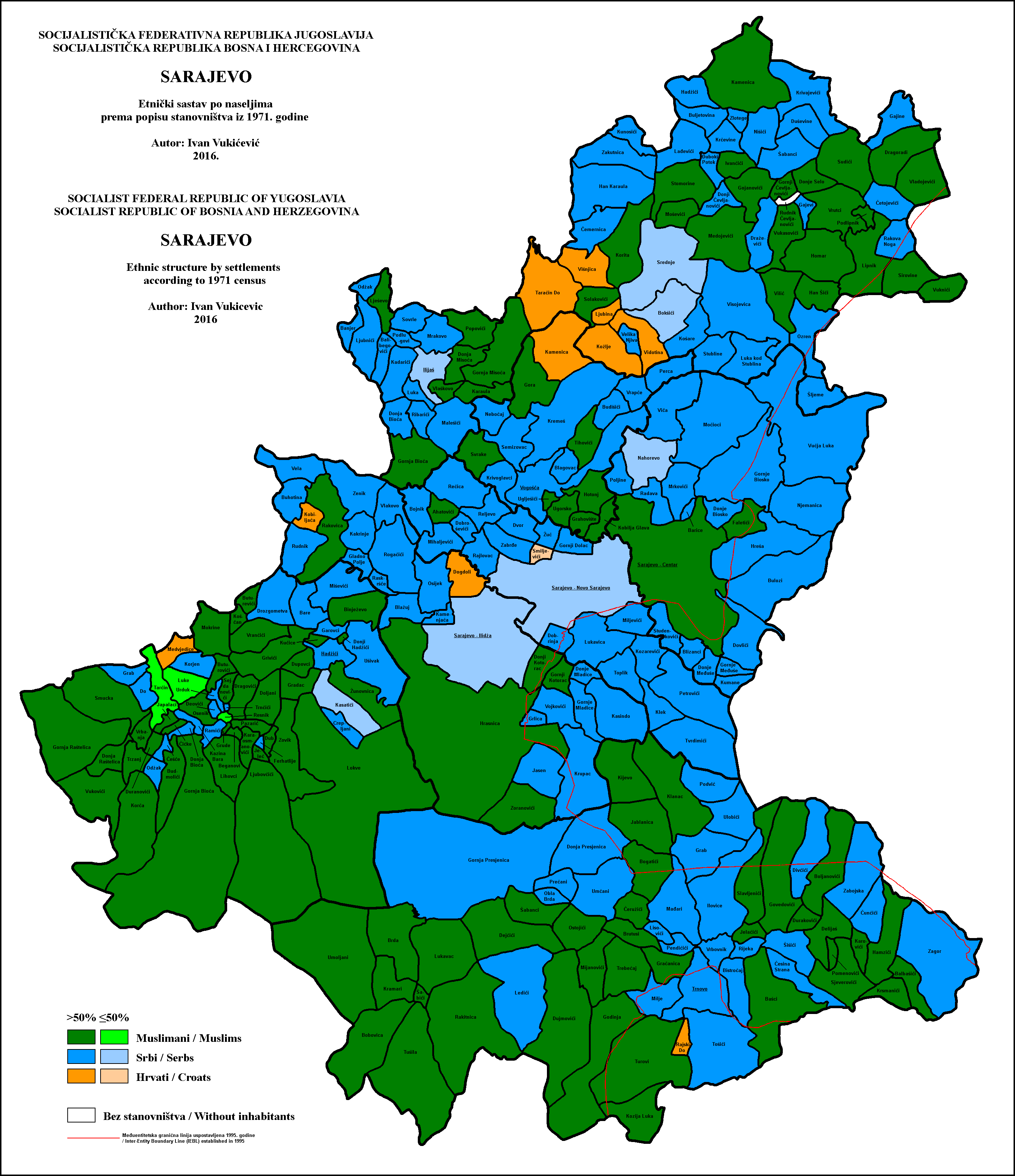
Ethnic structure of Sarajevo by settlements 1971

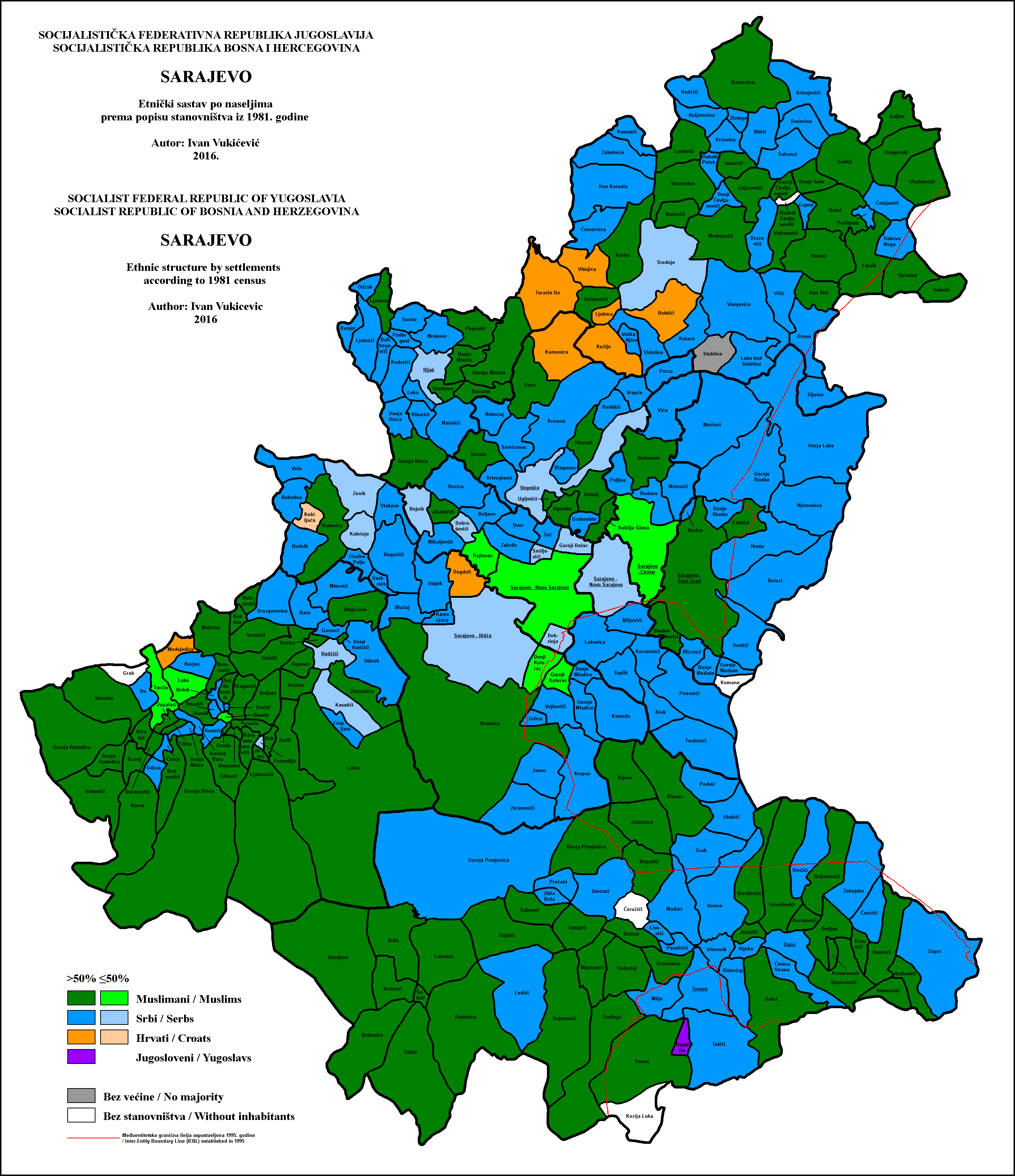
Ethnic structure of Sarajevo by settlements 1981

∗ 1991 census

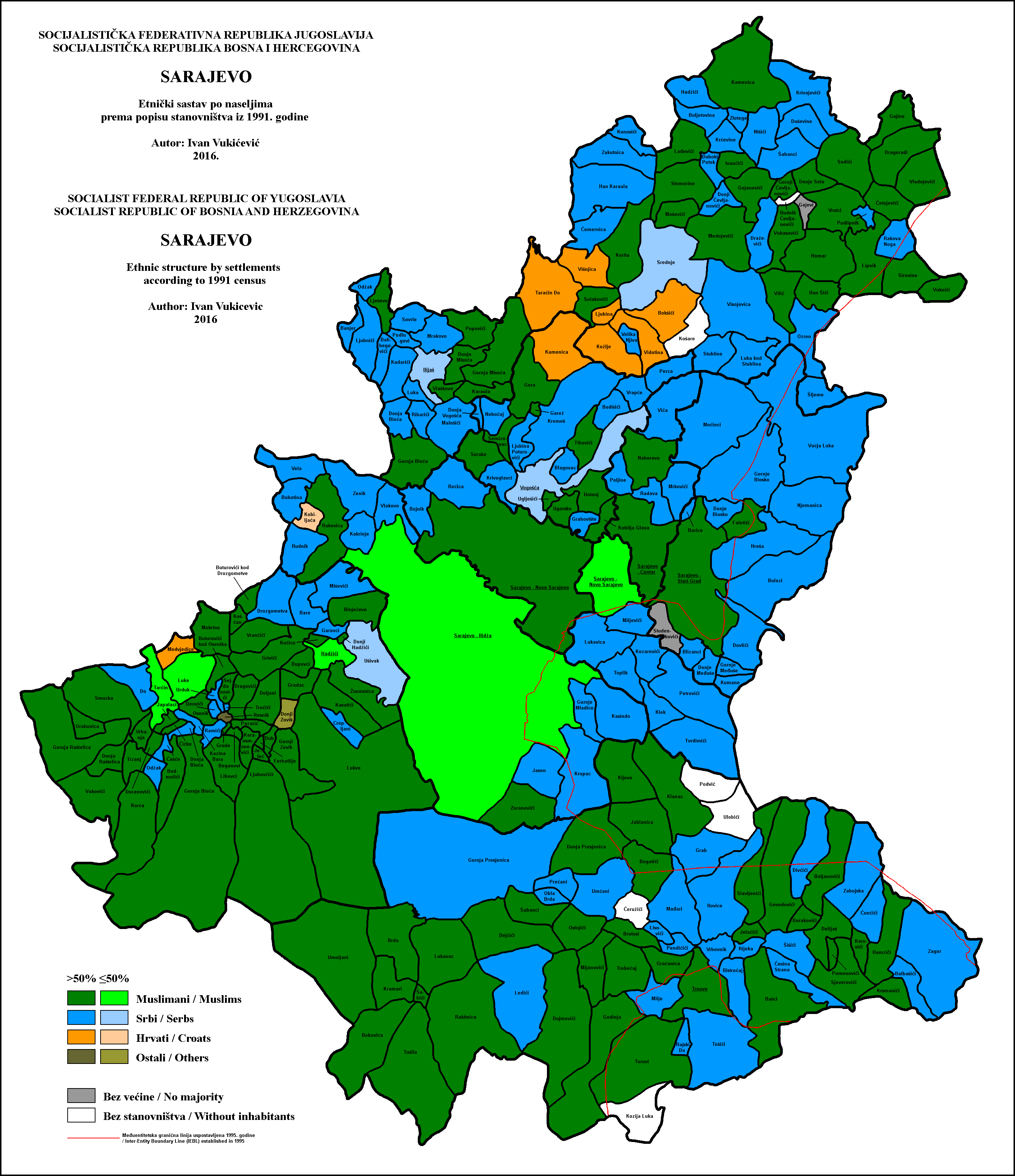
Ethnic structure of Sarajevo by settlements 1991

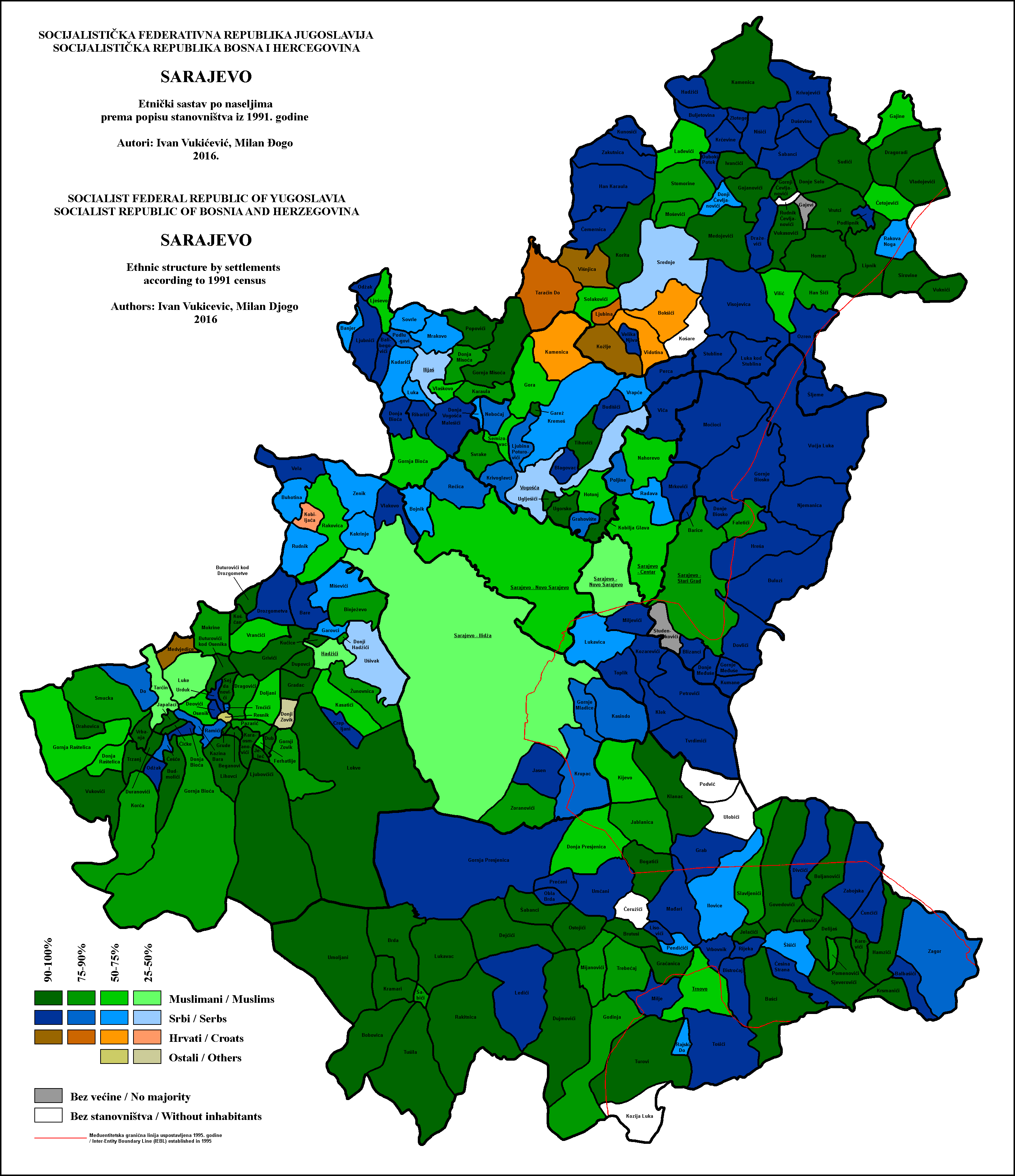
Ethnic structure of Sarajevo by settlements 1991

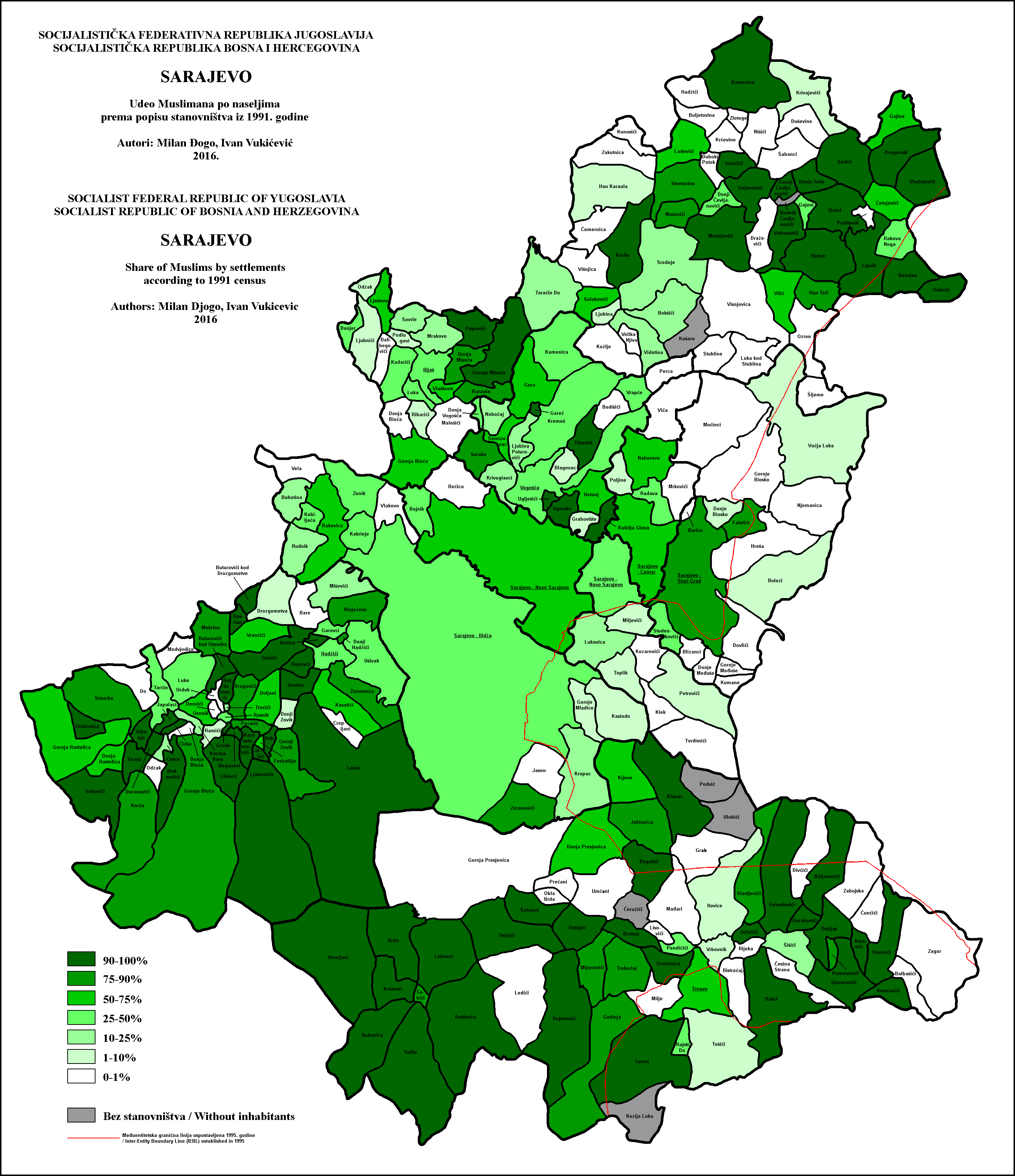
Share of Muslims in Sarajevo by settlements 1991

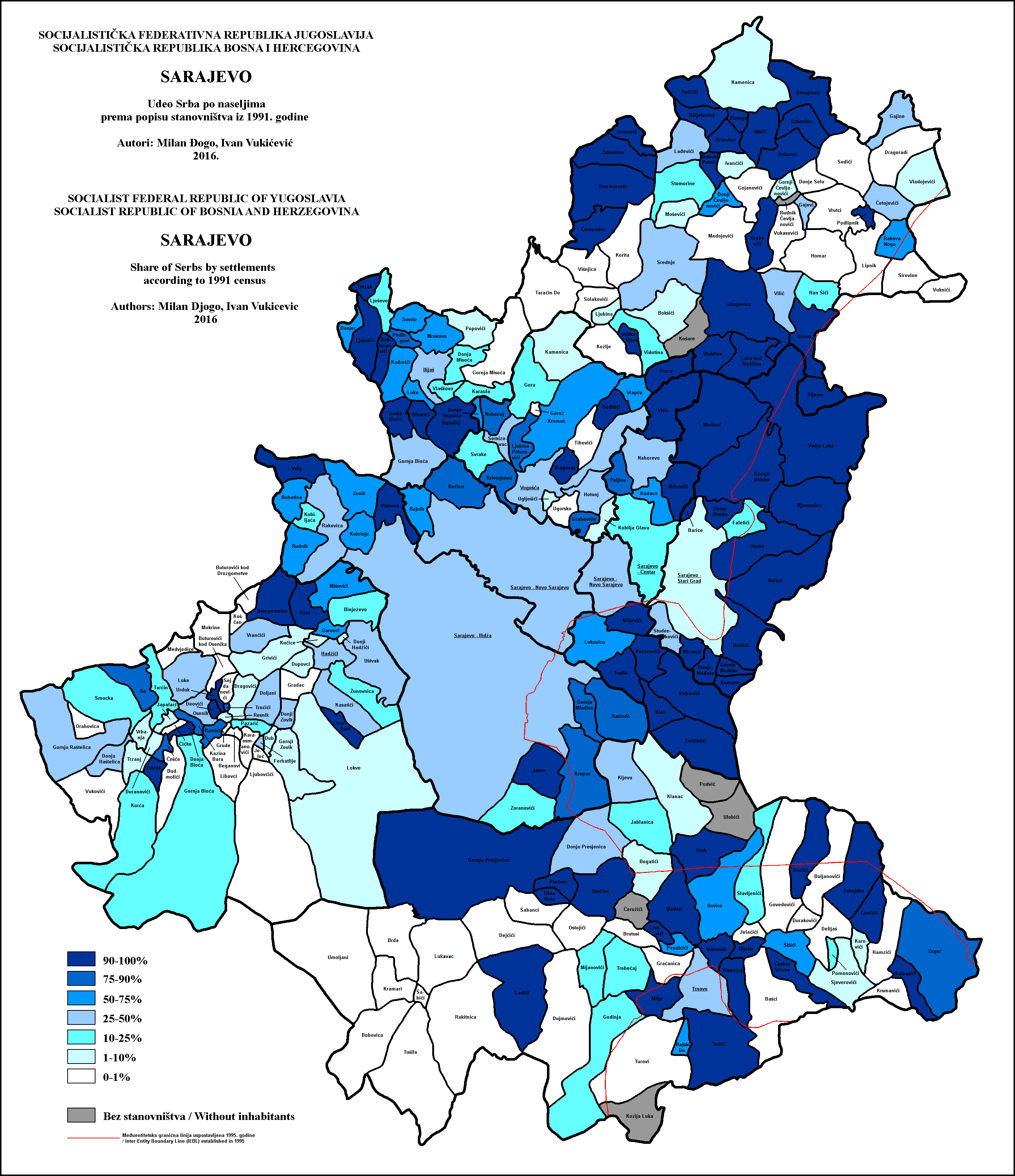
Share of Serbs in Sarajevo by settlements 1991

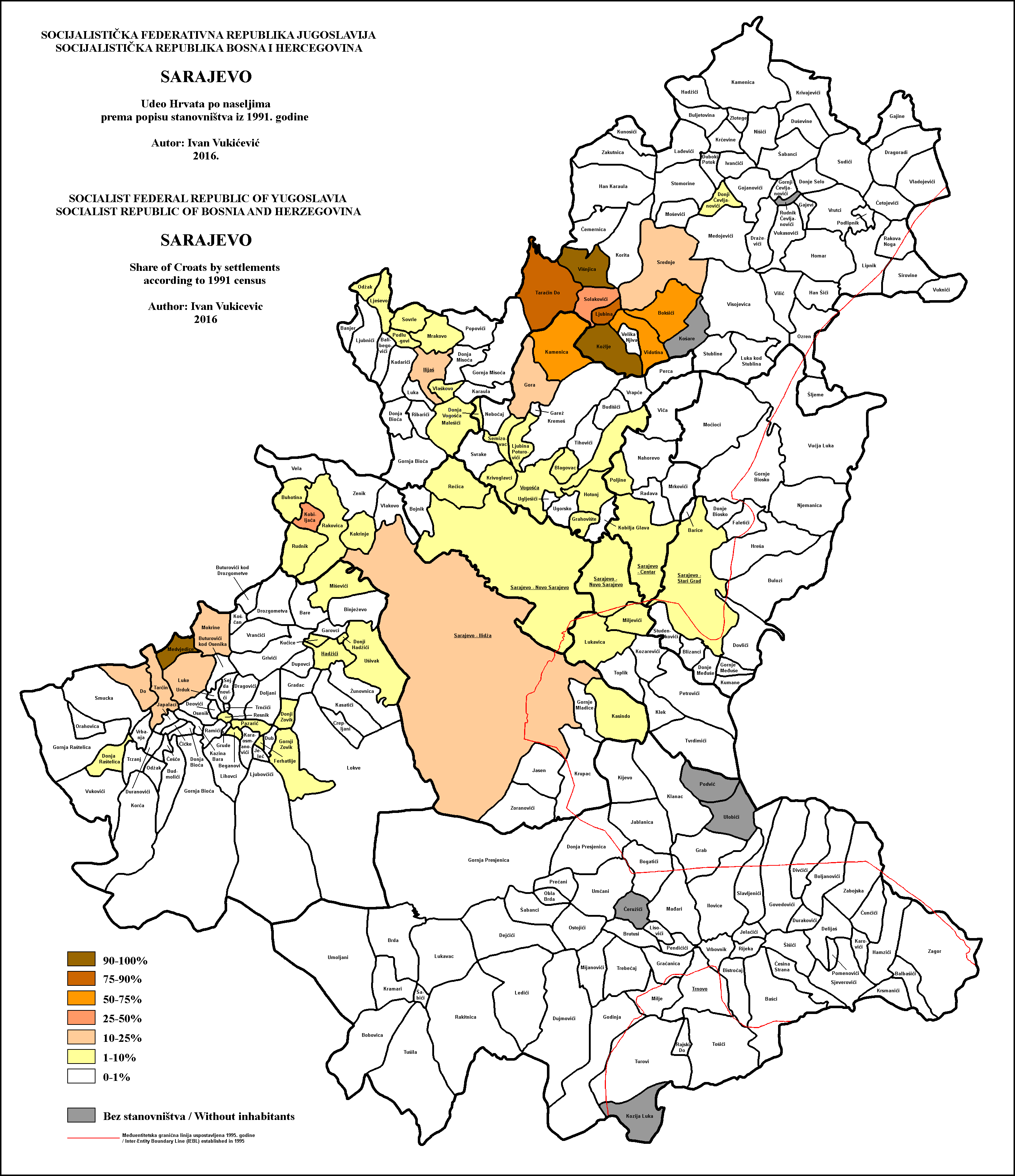
Share of Croats in Sarajevo by settlements 1991

∗ 2013 census

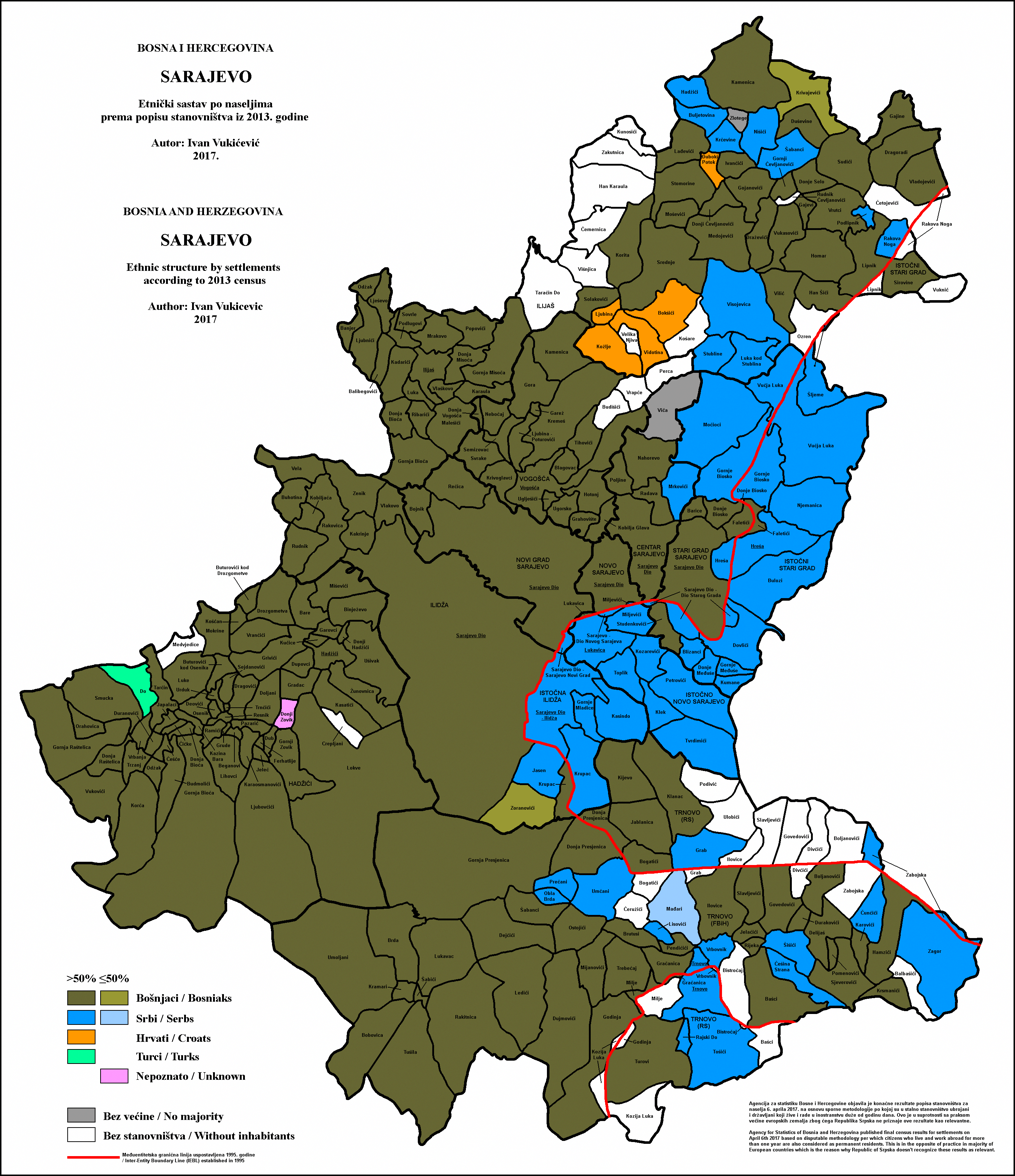
Ethnic structure of Sarajevo by settlements 2013

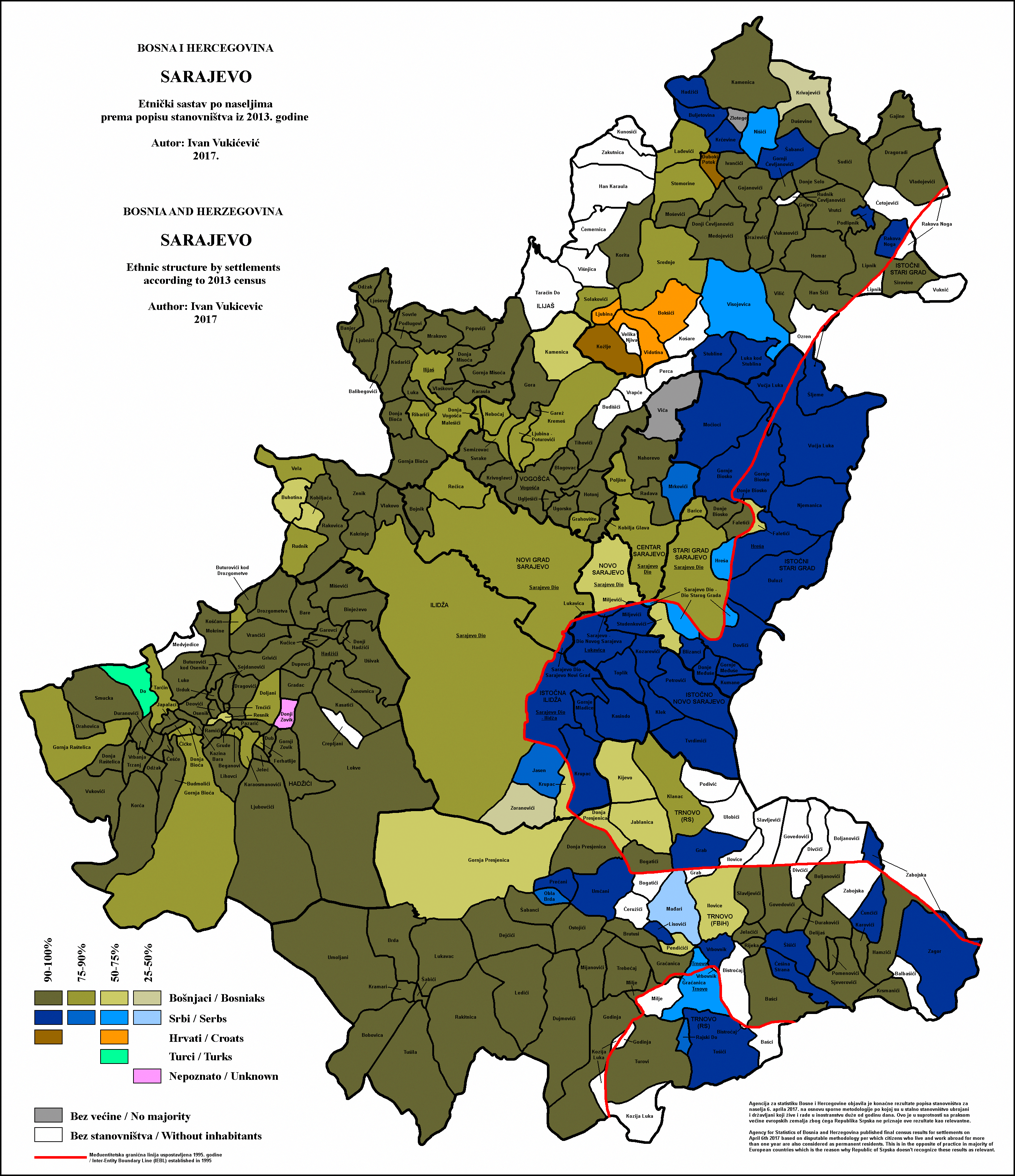
Ethnic structure of Sarajevo by settlements 2013

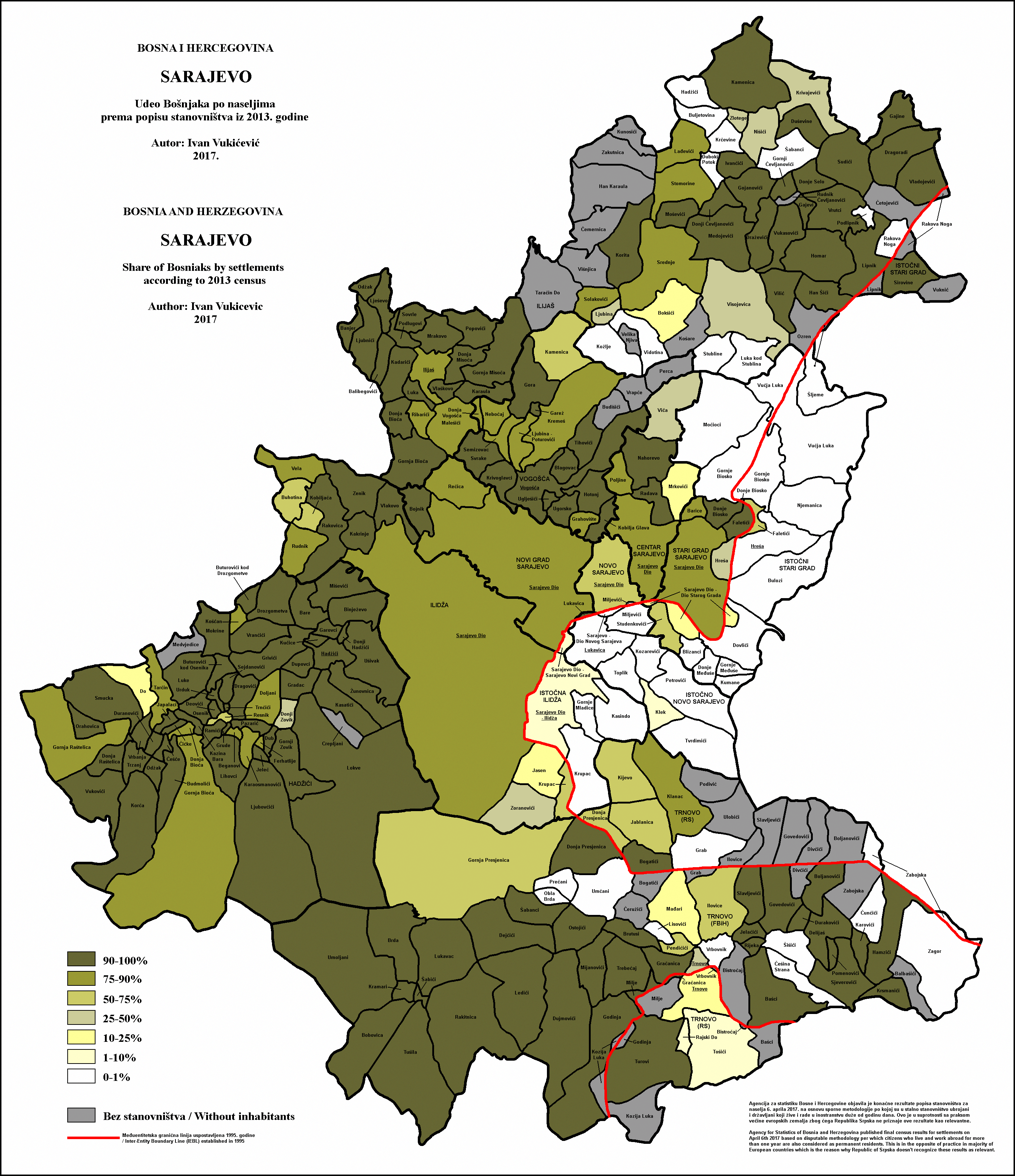
Share of Bosniaks in Sarajevo by settlements 2013

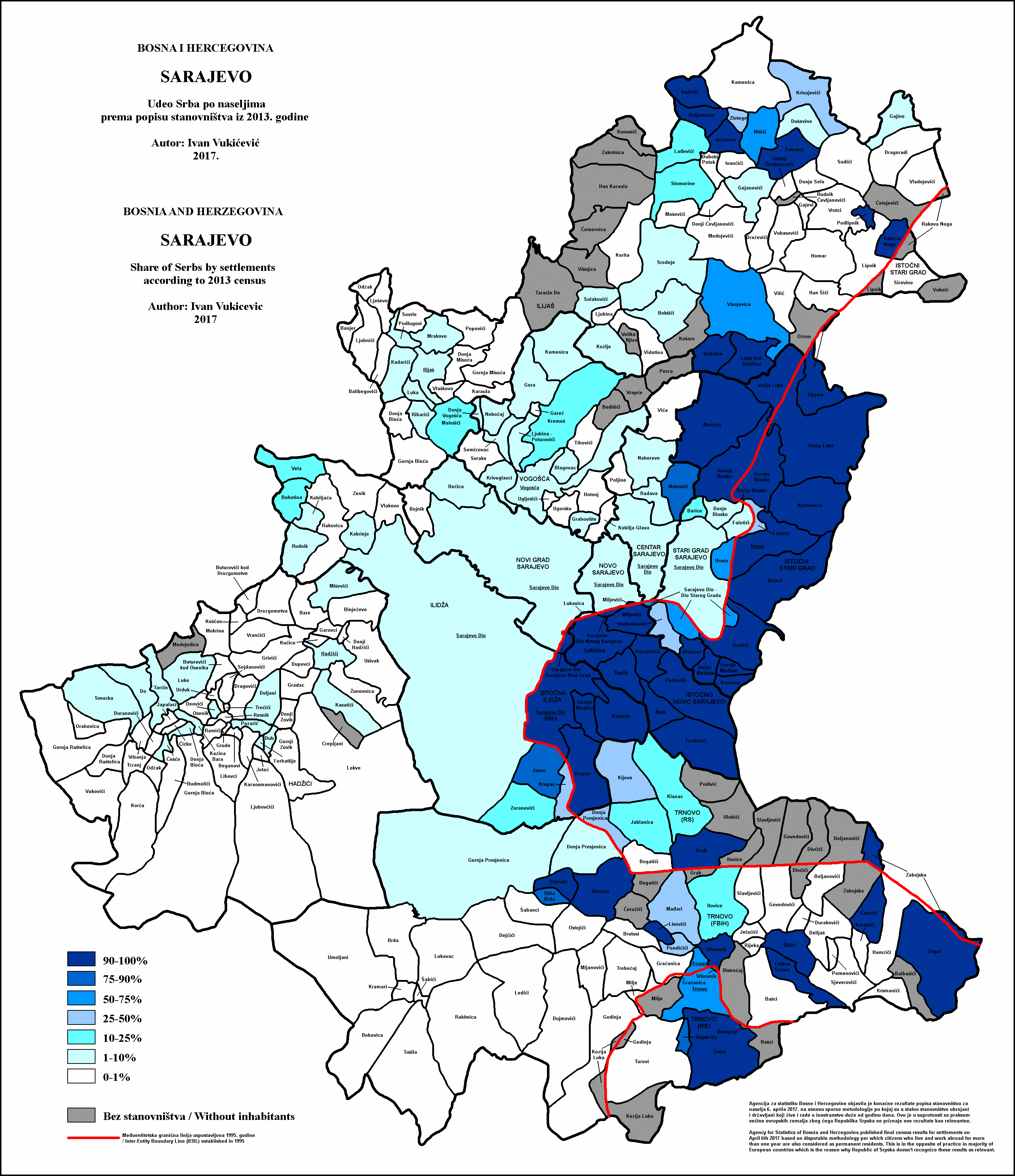
Share of Serbs in Sarajevo by settlements 2013

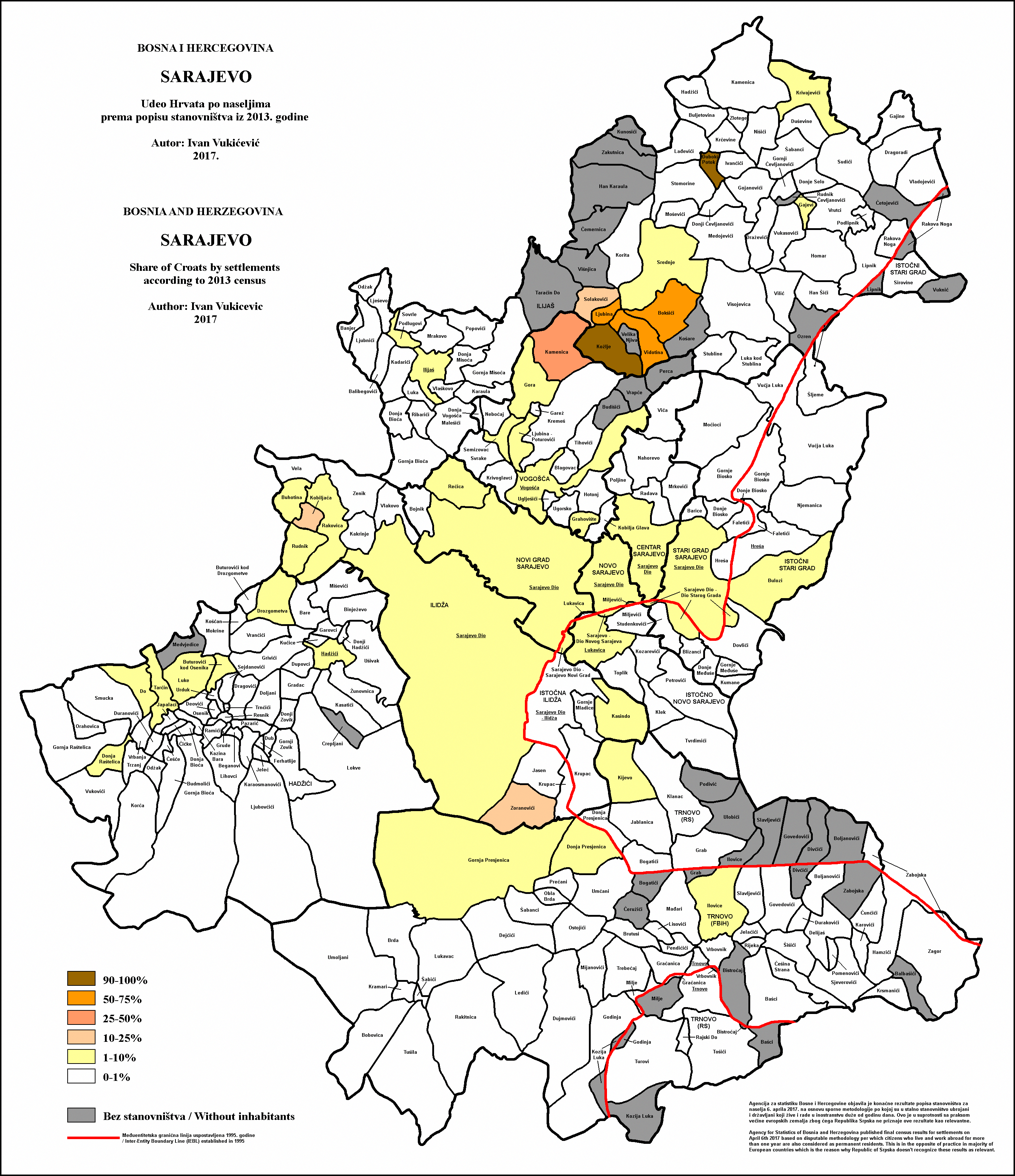
Share of Croats in Sarajevo by settlements 2013

== See also ==
- List of heads of the Sarajevo Canton
