= Pozderac family =

The Pozderac family are an influential Bosniak family from Cazin, Bosnia and Herzegovina, who rose to prominence in Bosanska Krajina as Bosnian Ottoman nobility. They have been called the "Bosniak Kennedy's".

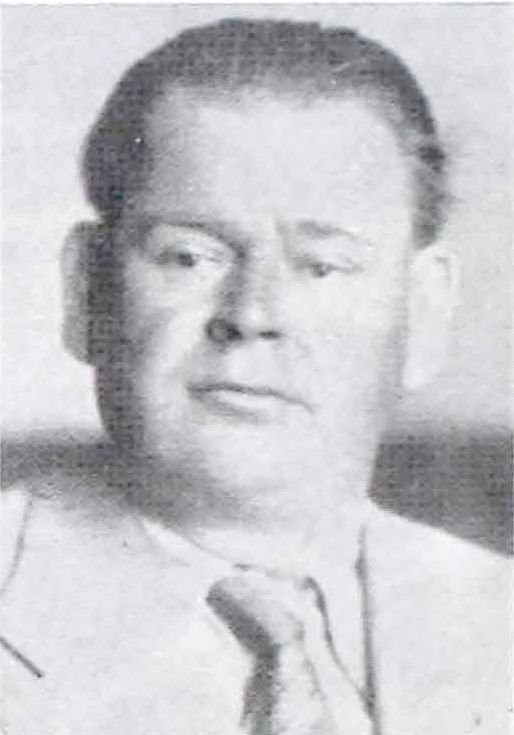
Nurija Pozderac

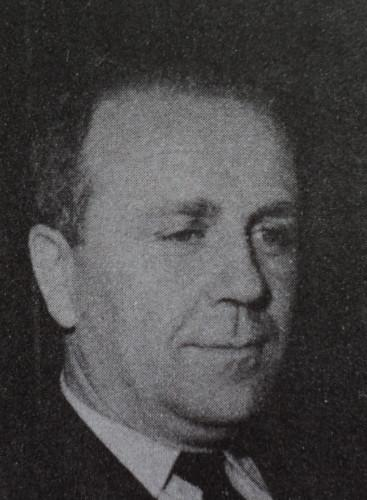
Hakija Pozderac

== Notable members ==
- Agha Murat Pozderac (1862–1930), was the last leader of Cazin, Bosnia and Herzegovina during Ottoman rule. His wife's name was Meleća. Murat's parents were Alija Pozderac and Fatima (née Omanović).
  - Nurija Pozderac (1892–1943), son of Murat and a local political leader and liberation fighter, killed in the line of duty during World War II near Tjentište.
    - Hakija Pozderac (1919–1994), son of Nurija Pozderac, Yugoslav politician.
    - Hamdija Pozderac (1924–1988), nephew of Nurija Pozderac. communist politician and the president of Bosnia and Herzegovina from 1971 to 1974. He was a vice president of the former Yugoslavia in the late 1980s, and was in line to become the president of Yugoslavia just before he was forced to resign from politics in 1987.
- Vuk Jeremić (born 1975), Serbian politician, Minister of Foreign Affairs of Serbia from 2007 until 2012. Great-grandson of Nurija Pozderac.
- Hamdija Lipovača (born 1976), Bosnian politician. Great-grandson of Nurija Pozderac.
