= Hamdija Lipovača =

Bosnian politician (born 1976)

Prime Minister of Una-Sana Canton
- In office 31 January 2011 – 10 February 2015
- Preceded by: Šemsudin Dedić
- Succeeded by: Izudin Saračević

Mayor of Bihać
- In office 2004–2010
- Preceded by: Adnan Alijagić
- Succeeded by: Albin Muslić
Parliamentary offices
Member of the House of Representatives of Bosnia and Herzegovina
In office 2010–2014
Constituency	1st Electoral Unit

Personal details
- Born: 20 December 1976 (age 49) Bihać, SR Bosnia and Herzegovina, SFR Yugoslavia
- Party: SBiH (2022–present)
- Other political affiliations: SDP BiH (1998–2022)
- Spouse: Jasmina Brkić
- Children: 3
- Education: University of Sarajevo

Hamdija Lipovača (born 20 December 1976) is a Bosnian politician who served as the Prime Minister of Una-Sana Canton from 2011 until his forced resignation three years later, following the violent protests and riots in Bosnia and Herzegovina, which took effect in February 2015. Lipovača was also the canton's Minister of Police. He previously served as the mayor of Bihać from 2004 to 2010.

Lipovača was arrested in December 2014 on charges of "abuse of office and forgery of documents." In March 2015, Lipovača was sentenced to two months in prison and served time until April 2015 when he was released.

== Early life ==
Lipovača was born in the Bosanska Krajina city Bihać in western Bosnia and Herzegovina, while Bosnia was a part of communist Yugoslavia. His father's name is Nurija, named after his grandfather Nurija Pozderac of the influential Bosniak political Pozderac family.

He enrolled in the University of Sarajevo in 1996, not long after the end of the Bosnian War. Upon graduating in 2000, Lipovača returned to his city of birth and became employed at the University of Bihać School of Law. In 2002 he defended a master's thesis at the University of Connecticut in the United States and after that joined a Bosnia and Herzegovina mission for the United Nations in New York.

== Political career ==
Lipovača became a part of the Social Democratic Party of Bosnia and Herzegovina political party in 1998 and eventually became the party's leader a decade later, and remained so until his removal on 21 February 2012. He was reinstated as the party's president on 3 July 2013.

He held his position as President of the Municipal Committee of Bihać from 2002 until 2008. In 2002 upon returning to Bihać from the United States, he was voted in as a member of the Assembly of the Una-Sana Canton, a position he held until 2004. Lipovača won the 2004 elections to become the mayor of Bihać. He was re-elected in 2008. He renounced the position two years later, when he was elected as a member of the Parliamentary Assembly of Bosnia and Herzegovina and as the prime minister of the Una-Sana Canton. Lipovača was voted in as the prime minister of the Una-Sana Canton on 3 October 2010 and took office on 31 January 2011.

In June 2013, the Federal Police Administration in Bosnia and Herzegovina, and its Detachment in Bihać, completed a report on the many years of illegal business activities and spending of public funds by Lipovača, against whom the Bihać Cantonal Prosecutor's Office filed a criminal complaint. Lipovača was accused of abuse/misuse of power and authority and forgery of official documents in conjunction with deception.

It is alleged that in 2007, Lipovača, then-mayor of Bihać, signed a contract claiming certain buildings in his city needed additional work done to them in the amount of 1,292,000 KM (about $902,222.40). He drafted and signed an official document in which he entered false data about the execution of additional work with the identical date and number of the protocol, but other monetary amounts with the aim of acquiring money for personal use. Although the contract does not specify which particular "buildings" in the city needed work done, there was a bridge built in the city at this time called Smaragdni most (Emerald Bridge). The cantonal budget was about 1,241,000 km, but the price agreed in late 2007 with the contractor was 1,333,000 km. The price for the construction of the aforementioned bridge was 328,000 km, in addition to making railings and pillars for the bridge. In Bihać, the fact that contractors worked on large projects for Lipovača's private estate was not kept a secret. Lipovača, whose wealth increased dramatically while he served as mayor of Bihać and prime minister of the Una-Sana Canton, owns a house in a Bihać, a home in the Croatian village Seline, two apartments on the Adriatic Sea, apartments in Sarajevo and Zagreb, and several cottages throughout Bosnia and Croatia. He is also a landlord.

On 17 July 2013, the Bosnia and Herzegovina Central Election Commission decided to begin proceedings to determine whether or not Lipovača had been employed by close relatives to powerful positions in Bosnia's largest power company, Elektroprivreda. During the investigation, it was found that his father Nurija was appointed to a high position in the company on 1 August 2011 and stayed in the position until 1 January 2012 as "director of the ordinary mandate of affiliates." This fact, along with others, was one of the reasons that Bosnian citizens felt that he was a corrupt politician.

Radio Sarajevo reported in December 2014 that Lipovača and his wife had multiple properties in Bosnia-Herzegovina and a beach-side home in Croatia, totaling nearly 1,000,000 KM and that both of them had loan debts of 218,000 km.

=== 2014 Bosnian riots and resignation ===
During the 2014 riots in Bosnia and Herzegovina, over 3,000 disgruntled citizens rallied at the Town Square in the western Bosnian town of Bihać to express dissatisfaction with the government of the Una-Sana Canton, one of Bosnia and Herzegovina's ten post-war cantons, and demanding the resignation of the cantons' Prime Minister and Minister of Police, Hamdija Lipovača.

In front of the local government building protesters from all over the country were greeted by police. Protesters shouted "Thieves!" and "We want resignation!" and asked the police to side with them. Police officers confiscated a number of Molotov cocktails and shops in the city center closed down as a precautionary measure. Hundreds of protesters gathered around Lipovača's home fighting with the police and demanding his resignation. The clash with police injured several people and the crowd later dispersed.

Bosnian and Croatian media reported that on 7 February Lipovača had escaped with his family to Starigrad, Croatia amid widespread riots in his country. On 8 February 2014 he posted "Bihać ♥" on his Facebook account, in a possible effort to make people believe that he was still in Bihać. That same day he was quoted as saying "I am in Bihać! I support the expression of dissatisfaction of citizens, but I condemn the violence, looting, arson and destruction." Lipovača refused to resign at first, saying he did not want to leave his canton "without a leader" and that he did not have anyone to hand the roles of Prime Minister and Minister of Police over to. At one point he stated "A small group of demonstrators will not make me resign."

He claimed to have met and talked to over 250 protesters in front of the Una-Sana Canton government building, passing the "barrier" of police officers, and claimed to have been assaulted by the "criminal" protesters, saying that one of them punched him. The crowds egged and stoned the government building, and destroyed the local hotel Emporium, claiming it was co-owned by Lipovača. He later said that his cousin was the hotel's actual owner. Protesters mockingly called the hotel Imperium.

On 9 February, he held a press conference in Bihać, during which he accused Bosnian President Željko Komšić of organizing anti-government riots and said that "Either we (politicians) all submit our resignation or none of us." He also stated that he had not escaped to Croatia as was reported by some media and even by the police. On the same day he held the press conference, people continued protesting, peacefully. They said that Lipovača "...must resign, and that it is not a matter of his choice."

Lipovača officially submitted his resignation paperwork less than an hour after midnight 10 February 2014, after days of refusing to leave post. His resignation was accepted about five hours later by 24 of the 29 members of the Assembly of the Una-Sana Canton, but Lipovača remained in the technical mandate until 10 February 2015. It was reported by several media sources on 11 February that he and his family had escaped to Croatia following his resignation and amid riots and protests throughout Bosnia and Herzegovina.

=== Arrest and sentencing ===
On the orders of the Una-Sana Cantonal Court in Bihać, several locations in Bihać were raided by police on the morning of 17 December 2014 and Lipovača was arrested at his home in the street Midžić Mahala. The arrest was confirmed to media by the Federal Interior Ministry, citing the reason as "abuse of office and forgery of documents." It is accused that, while serving as mayor of Bihać in 2007, Lipovača "exceeded the limits of power" and, contrary to the Law on Public Procurement, annexed his initial contract, as well as the contracts on performing additional work on certain buildings in his town in the amount of 1,292,000 KM.

Lipovača and his business partner Alen Gluhalić, who was also arrested the same day, were released from jail on 16 January 2015, with a future court date set to determine punishment. Lipovača and Gluhalić were suspected of fraud during the 2007 reconstruction of the Bihać sports and recreation center Stens. Lipovača was at the time Mayor of Bihać and Gluhalić was the owner of a construction company Agra. According to investigators, Lipovača signed more annex to the original construction contract, and entered incorrect information on the execution of additional works with the same date, but with another amount of money in order to obtain illegal profit for the contractor – the Bihać-based company Agra, owned by Alen Gluhalić. According to the original contract, the construction should have cost 810,000 km, but after the aforementioned annex project, the value increased to 1.7 million KM.

After two months of freedom, Lipovača was sentenced to two months in prison by the Una-Sana Cantonal Court in Bihać on 24 March 2015. He was returned to prison to serve his sentence, but was released again on 8 April 2015, with authorities giving no reason for the early release.

== Personal life ==
Lipovača is cousin to Serbian politician Vuk Jeremić. They both descended from the Pozderac family, considered the most influential Bosniak political family during communist Yugoslavia. Lipovača and Jeremić share the same great-grandparents, Nurija Pozderac and his wife Devleta, who are both known for sheltering Jews during World War II. In effect, Lipovača is also related to Yugoslav politicians Hakija and Hamdija Pozderac who occupied some of the most powerful political posts for years in the Socialist Republic of Bosnia and Herzegovina).

In November 2012, Lipovača's great-grandfather and great-grandmother Nurija and Devleta Pozderac were posthumously awarded the honorific of Righteous among the Nations by the Jewish victims memorial Yad Vashem for their acts of saving Jews during World War II in Cazin on the territory of the Ustaše-run Nazi-puppet Independent State of Croatia. The Jews Nurija and Develta sheltered, escaped during transport to Jasenovac concentration camp.

Lipovača is married to Jasmina (née Brkić). They have three daughters.
