= 2014 unrest in Bosnia and Herzegovina =

Series of riots in Bosnia and Herzegovina

- Part of the Impact of the Arab Spring
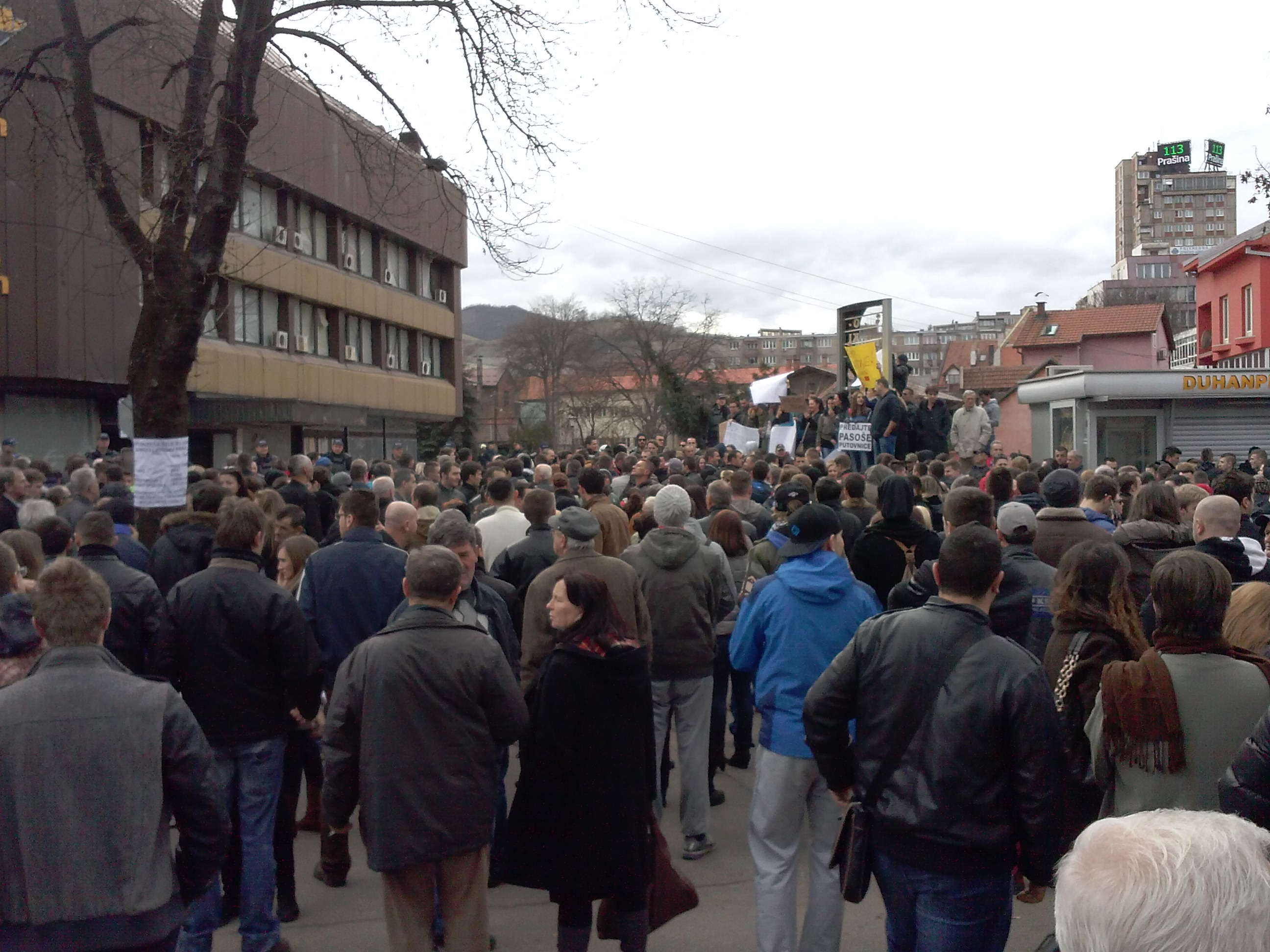
- Protests in Zenica, 10 February 2014
- Date: Riots and unrest: 4–10 February 2014 (1 week); Demonstrations: February–April 2014 (ca. 2–3 months)
- Location: Bosnia and Herzegovina (mostly in the Federation of Bosnia and Herzegovina)
- Caused by: Mass unemployment; Mass poverty; Privatization of government services; Political corruption and nepotism; Police brutality
- Goals: Resignation of the government; Political reforms; Improvement of living standards
- Methods: Protests; Riots; Civil resistance; Civil disobedience; Demonstrations; Online activism
- Result: Mass resignation of local government officials in 4 cities, including Sarajevo and Tuzla: Resignation of the Prime Minister of the Una-Sana Canton Hamdija Lipovača

Parties
Citizens; UDAR (anti-government organization); Coordinating organizations ("Plenums"); Trade unions; Anarchist activists	Government of Bosnia and Herzegovina; Ministry of Security; State Investigation and Protection Agency; Police of Federation of Bosnia and Herzegovina; Police of Republika Srpska

Lead figures
	(Bosnia and Herzegovina) Predrag Kurteš (Bosnia and Herzegovina) Fahrudin Radončić

Casualties
- Deaths: 0
- Injuries: As of 8 February: 200 (Tuzla); 121 (Sarajevo); 50 (Zenica)
- Arrested: 38

The 2014 unrest in Bosnia and Herzegovina was a series of demonstrations and riots that began in the northern town of Tuzla on 4 February 2014 but quickly spread to multiple cities in Bosnia and Herzegovina, including Sarajevo, Zenica, Mostar, Jajce, and Brčko, among others, for social reasons and with the aim of overthrowing the government. The riots were the most violent scenes the country had seen since the end of the Bosnian War in 1995. The rioting largely took place in the entity of Federation of Bosnia and Herzegovina, and the same level of unrest or activism did not occur in Republika Srpska.

Some news sources, such as BBC and The New York Times, used the name Bosnian Spring when describing the riots, a terminology taken from other events such the Arab Spring and the Prague Spring. The Swedish politician Carl Bildt also said that "in some places there has been talk about a Bosnian Spring".

Most of the riots calmed down by 8 February, although protesting continued throughout the days that followed.

By April 2014, the protests had faded away due to decreasing participation. A Balkan Insight article said they "ran out of steam."

== Background ==
After World War II, Tuzla developed into a major industrial and cultural centre during the communist period in the Socialist Federal Republic of Yugoslavia. During the first decade of the 21st century, four former state-owned companies, including furniture and washing powder factories, were sold to private owners who were contracted to invest in and make them profitable. Instead, the new owners opted for asset stripping, stopped paying workers and filed for bankruptcy. The closures left hundreds of workers without jobs in a country that already has a high unemployment rate of between 27%–47%. Although official data show that 27.5 percent of its working population is unemployed, at least another 20 percent of people are estimated to be engaged in the so-called grey economy. An average monthly salary in Bosnia and Herzegovina was 300 euros at the time (about $350), with one in five citizens living below the poverty line.

== Protests ==
Locations where protests took place, as reported by klix.ba. The major sites of protest are marked by name in the map.

The protests mark the largest outbreak of public anger over high unemployment and two decades of political inertia in the Balkan country of 3.8 million people since the end of the 1992–95 war.

=== Tuzla ===
4–5 February

Protests began on 4 February 2014, peacefully, in the city of Tuzla, Bosnia and Herzegovina, but turned violent the following day when hundreds of demonstrators, mostly former employees of several big companies, such as Dita, Polihem, Guming and Konjuh, clashed with police near the Tuzla local government building demanding compensation and calling on Tuzla officials to intervene instantly. Demonstrators blame local officials for allowing several state firms to collapse between 2000 and 2008 after being privatized, leaving many unemployed.

The protests later spread to various cities across Bosnia and Herzegovina, including Bihać, Mostar, Zenica, Kakanj and the capital Sarajevo.

Due to the recent closures of factories and firms in Tuzla, at least 600 protesters tried to storm the building of the Tuzla local government, accusing authorities of turning a blind eye to the collapse of a number of state firms after their privatization. Some of the protesters threw eggs, flares and stones at the windows of the building and set tires on fire, blocking traffic in the city center. Police eventually forced demonstrators back and cordoned off the building. One of the hundreds of protesters in the city said: "This is the start of the Bosnian Spring," alluding to the ongoing Arab Spring which began in 2010.

The protesters gathered in front of the cantonal government building, requesting compensation and repayments of healthcare and pension payments after the privatized companies for which they worked failed. Local media reports said that some protesters scuffled with police after breaking into the cantonal government building, while others set garbage containers and tires on fire. It was reported that, by the end of the day, a total of twenty-two people, including 17 police officers, had been injured, while 24 were arrested for their involvement in the protests.

As a result of the police brutality the day before, protesters were outraged. The next day, the number of protesters grew enormously; around 6,000 individuals gathered in front of the cantonal government building. The number of injured individuals also rose enormously. According to local newspapers, around 100 policemen were injured, with most of the injuries due to being hit by stones. 11 cars were destroyed and 27 protesters were arrested. Around 20 civilians sustained minor injuries.

6 February

On Thursday, 6 February, the protests spread into multiple cities in the country, at first by people who wanted to show solidarity with the citizens of Tuzla. In the capital city, Sarajevo, protesters clashed with police who had blocked traffic in the city center. Four officers were hospitalized. Over 200 people blocked traffic in Mostar and about 150 Zenica citizens protested in front of their local government building. One of the protestors in Zenica was quoted: "Today we fought for Tuzla, tomorrow we fight for all of us." Protests also broke out in Bihać and Tešanj, among others.

27 people who had been arrested the day before were released. That day also marked the first time since the start of the uprising that police used tear gas on the crowds. More than two dozen people were hospitalized with tear-gas-related injuries.

Schools throughout Tuzla were closed and residents of buildings yelled insults and threw buckets of water at the officers who passed-by in full riot gear. Elderly neighbors banged on their windows and balconies.

7 February

The Government Building of Tuzla Canton burning, 7 February 2014
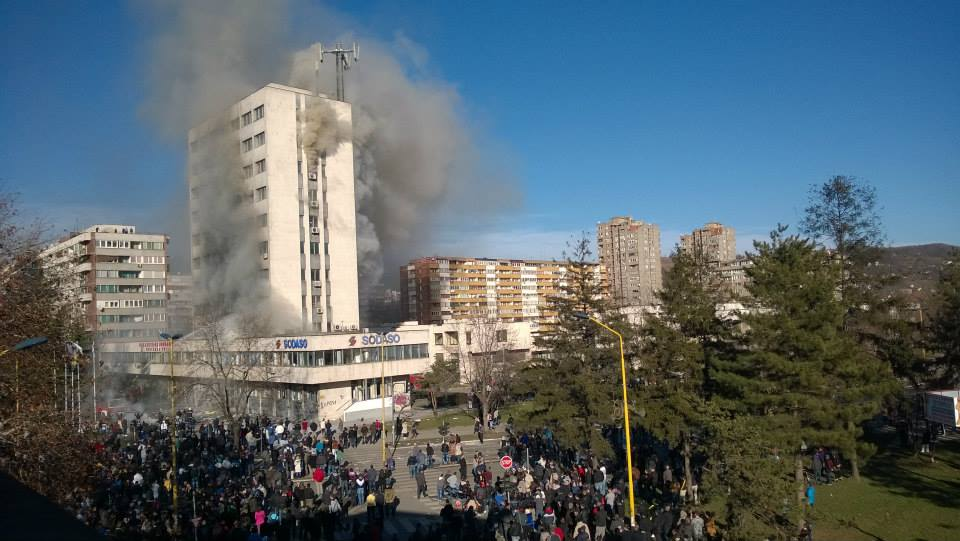
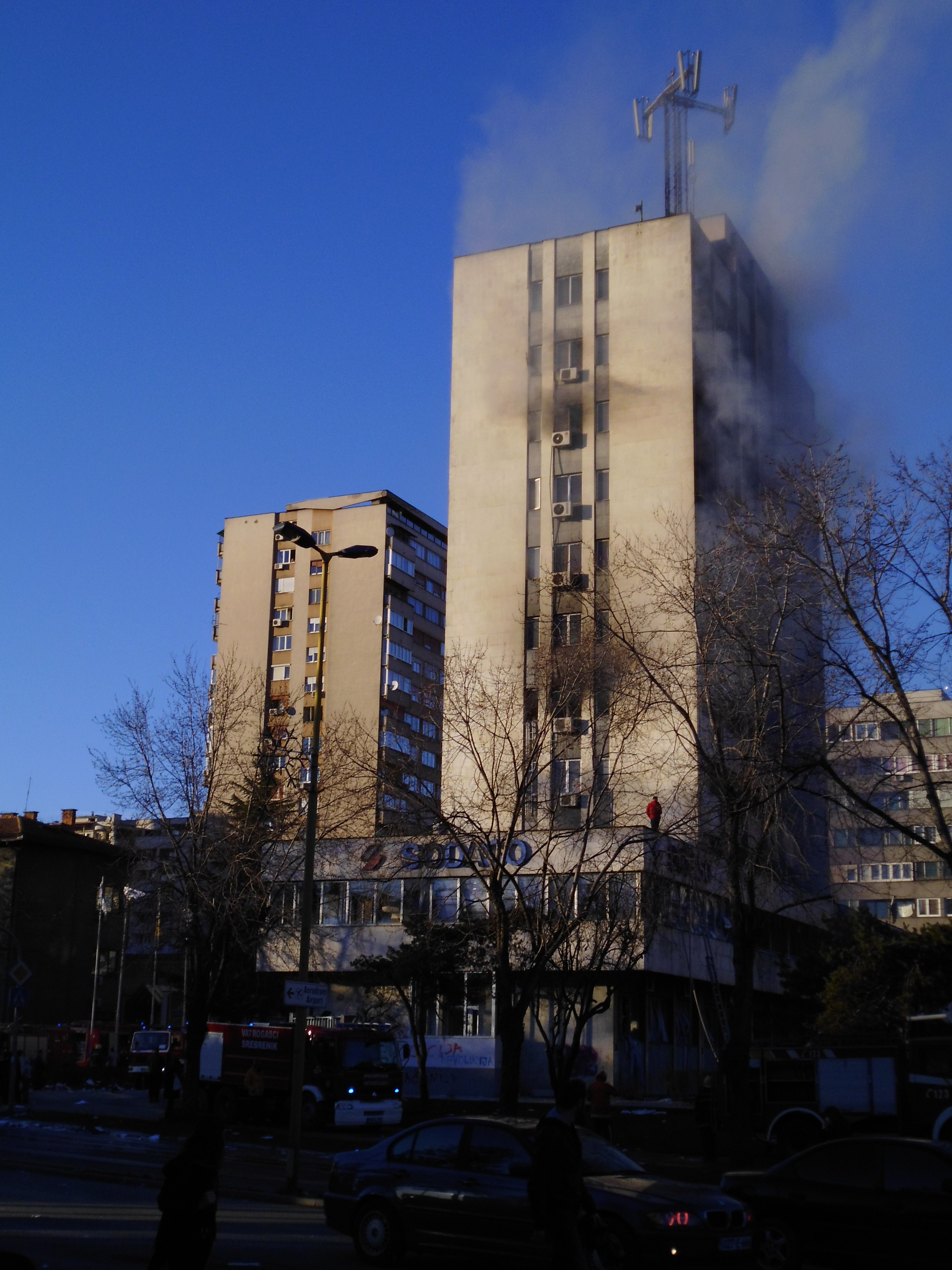

On 7 February, mass crowds began to gather at the same place and in over 20 major cities across the country. People gathered in their city centers to support the protests in Tuzla. According to the official statements, more than 130 people, including 104 police officers, were injured on the third day of anti-government demonstrations in Tuzla alone. After a long day of waiting, 10,000 outraged protesters broke through the last line of police defense around the cantonal government building. Around 100 younger protesters stormed into the building, throwing furniture and papers out of the windows and burning the building afterwards.

Even quick intervention by local fire crews could not prevent the fire from spreading to other floors. The protesters gave them a "calm hour," after which the protests continued in front of the cantonal court. Protesters asked workers of the cantonal court to address them about their plans in freeing the remaining protesters arrested that day and the day before, which included the leader and organizer of the demonstrations. Shortly thereafter, a rain of stones started hitting the cantonal court. The group of 10,000 people started moving towards the municipal building, where all workers were evacuated before the angry mob arrived. The attack on the municipal building included a few short fights between the protesters and the special police units. It included the use of tear gas, which outraged the protesters even more. After the police fell back, protesters started throwing bricks and stones at the building, breaking windows that way. Shortly after burning the municipal building, it was announced that the police forces had switched sides and joined the protesters.

During the unrest on Friday, 7 February, the mayor of Brčko was taken hostage by the crowd for a short while and then released.

In the afternoon, a unit of special police of the Tuzla canton, under commanding officer Dževad Korman, lowered their shields and took off their helmets, which caused a wave of enthusiasm from the crowd, the members of which then approached and shook hands with the special forces members. Both the regular and the judicial police followed suit in front of the court and the prosecution buildings.

8 February

By 8 February, the riots had stopped and all the people had resumed peaceful protests and began clearing the streets of garbage and debris.

=== Zenica ===
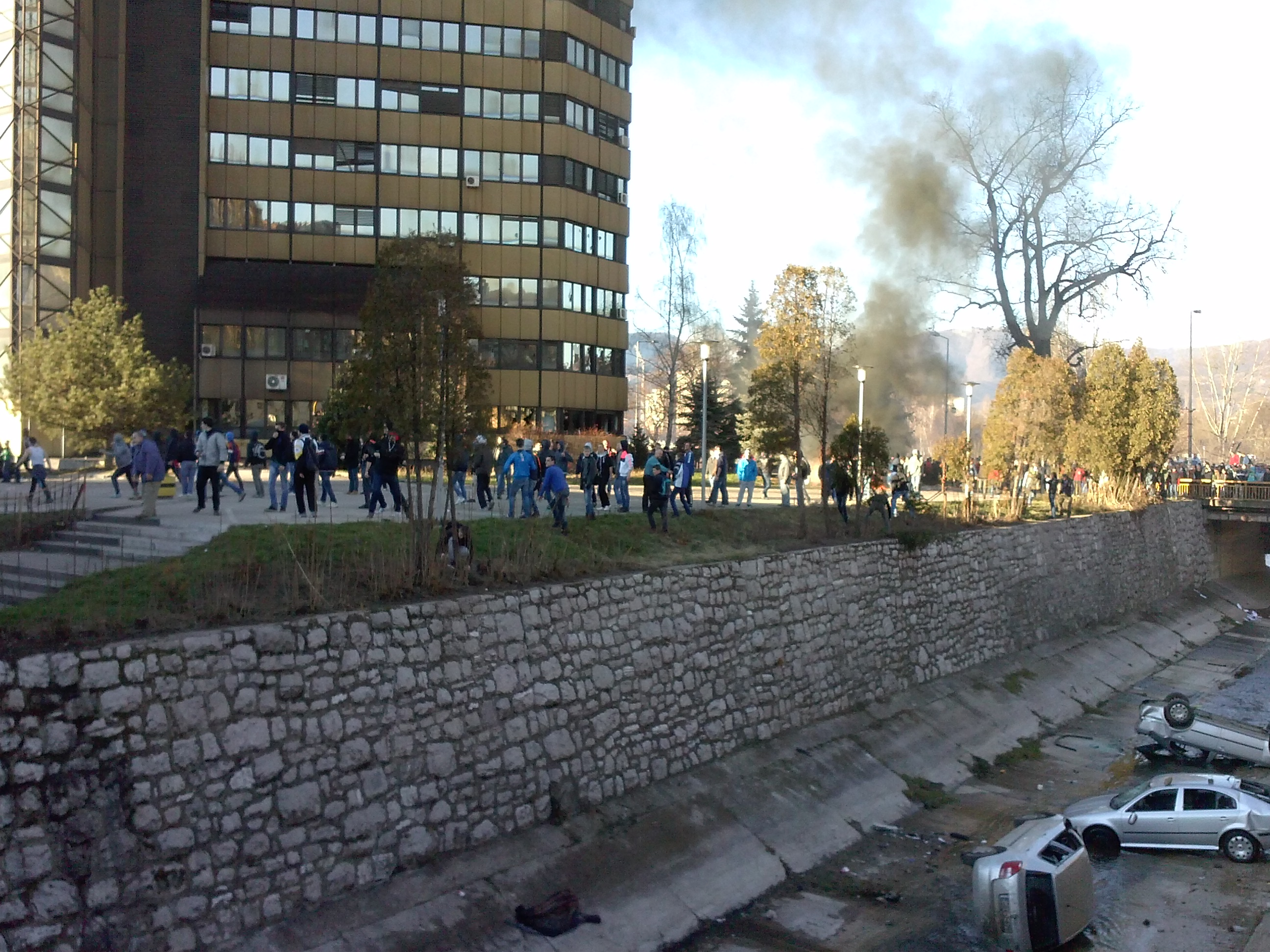
Protests in Zenica on 7 February 2014.

On 7 February, protestors in Zenica forced their way through a police cordon and set fire to a local government building and surrounding cars. The entire government of Zenica-Doboj Canton announced that they would resign during their next meeting.

On 9 February, late in the night, the government of the Zenica-Doboj Canton analyzed the situation.

On 10 February, protesters gathered again in front of the Cantonal building, demanding immediate changes in social politics. Protest representatives held a meeting with the government officials to present their demands. During the protests, the main city boulevard was blocked for traffic.

=== Sarajevo ===
7 February

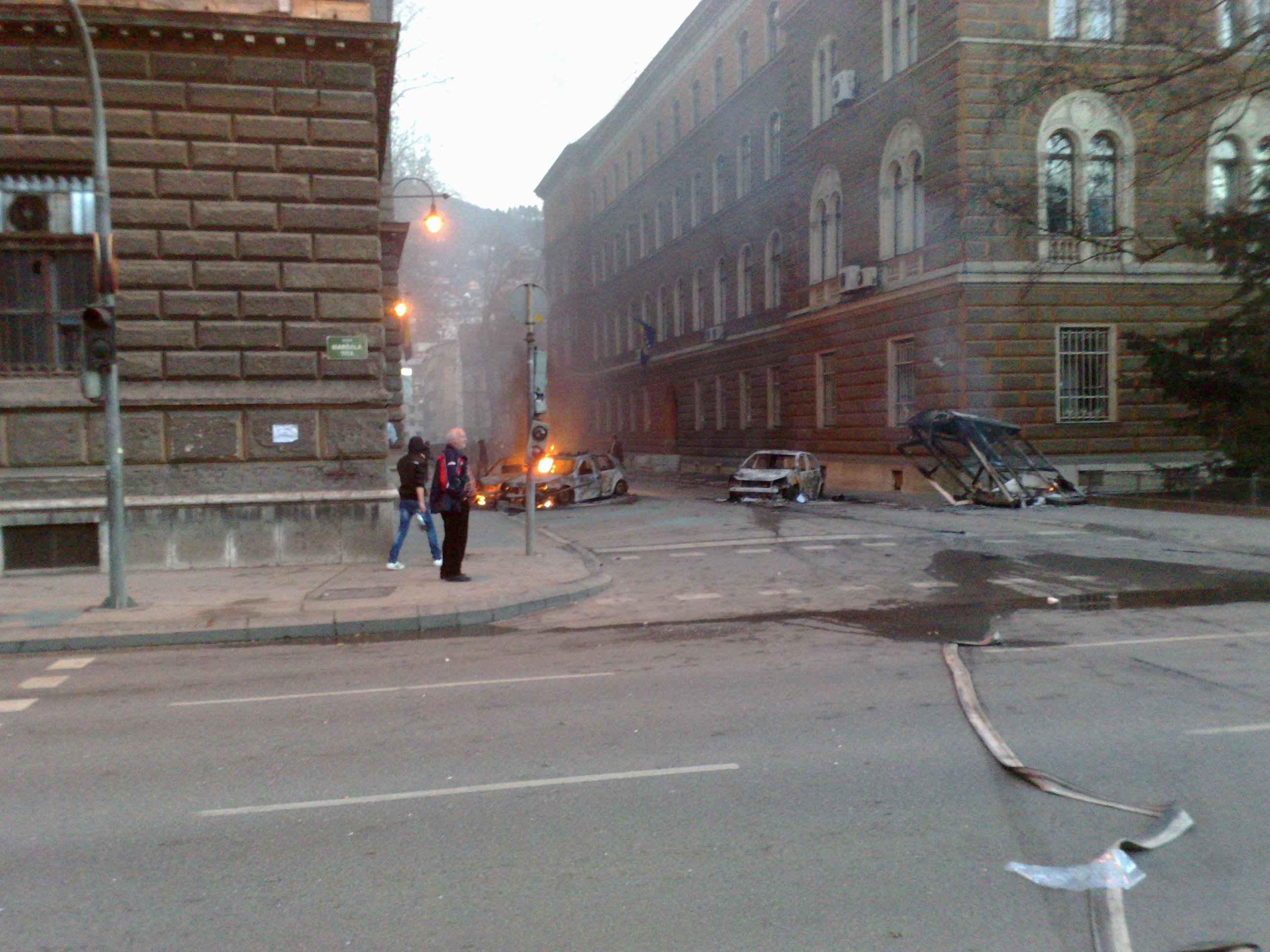
Burning cars near Presidency palace, 7 February 2014

Tear gas and smoke blanketed downtown Sarajevo, where police fired rubber bullets on several thousand protesters who set fire to the headquarters of the capital's cantonal government. Water cannon was also used to disperse protesters who were trying to enter the presidency building.

Dense smoke was caused by the burning of several police cars near the Building of the Presidency of Bosnia and Herzegovina, which was also heavily damaged when the demonstrators set fire to sections of the State Archives of Bosnia and Herzegovina, which is located there. Demonstrators also torched and stoned the building of the Centar Municipality, Sarajevo, as well as the seat of the regional government of the Sarajevo Canton.

8–9 February

Peaceful protests with at least 200 people continued at 16:00 on 8 February, protesters demanding release of some young people from prisons that were involved in violent riots days earlier. The protesters called for peaceful protests to continue and demand the change of the incumbent government. A spokesperson for the municipal court of Sarajevo, Alem Hamzić, stated that 33 protesters had been released—adding, "Criminal proceedings will be launched against some ten demonstrators with court likely imposing prohibitive measures. Prohibitive measures include: ban on meeting and communicating, confiscation of passports and identity documents, and they will need to report twice weekly to the relevant police department." Peaceful demonstrations continued throughout the day on 9 February.

10 February

Some time after 10 o'clock in the evening, an explosion in Skenderija shocked the Sarajevo metropolitan area; no casualties were reported.

=== Bihać ===
Protests began in Bihać as early as 6 February. On 8 February, over 3,000 disgruntled citizens rallied at the Town Square to express dissatisfaction with the government of the Una-Sana Canton, one of Bosnia and Herzegovina's ten post-war cantons, demanding the resignation of the canton's Prime Minister Hamdija Lipovača and the Minister of the Police.

In front of the local government building, protesters from all over the country were met by police. Protesters shouted "Thieves!" and "We want resignation!" and asked the police to side with them. Police officers confiscated a number of Molotov cocktails. Shops in the city center closed down as a precautionary measure. Hundreds of protesters gathered around Prime Minister Lipovača's home, fighting against the police and demanding resignation. The clash with police injured several people and the crowd later dispersed.

On 10 February 2014, after days of protests that involved at least 3,000 people, the Prime Minister of the Una-Sana Canton Hamdija Lipovača officially resigned.

== UDAR in May ==
On 5 May the anti-government organization under the name of "UDAR", which was already involved in the unrest, announced new protests on 9 May in Sarajevo. The protesters planned to march from cities and towns across Bosnia, primarily Tuzla, Zenica and Mostar, as well as other towns. However, any events announced earlier never occurred.

== Neighboring countries ==
Protests were held on 12 February in Belgrade, Serbia, and on 13 February in Zagreb, Croatia, in support of the ongoing political struggle in Bosnia. Two women were reportedly detained by the police in Zagreb. There were reports of anti-government protests coming from neighbouring Montenegro and also Kosovo.

== Resignations ==
- Sead Čaušević, Prime Minister of Tuzla Canton.
- Munib Husejnagić, Prime Minister of Zenica-Doboj Canton.
- Suad Zeljković, Prime Minister of Sarajevo Canton.
- Hamdija Lipovača, Prime Minister of Una-Sana Canton.

== Damages ==
Monetary

The estimated cost in all the cities across the country has been estimated by the Klix portal [8 February, during the riots] to be around 50 million KM (≈ €25 million).

Cultural

Large amounts of historical documents were destroyed when sections of the Archives of Bosnia and Herzegovina, housed in the presidential building, were set on fire. Among the lost archival material were documents and gifts from the Ottoman period, original documents from the 1878–1918 Austro-Hungarian rule in Bosnia and Herzegovina, as well as documentations of the interwar period, the 1941–1945 rule of the Independent State of Croatia, papers from the following years, and about 15,000 files from the 1996–2003 Human Rights Chamber for Bosnia and Herzegovina.

In the repositories that were burnt, about 60 percent of the material was lost, according to estimates by Šaban Zahirović, the head of the Archives. Zahirović also mentioned issues with water damage from the firefighting, but said that it could be dealt with. Further, he wanted to clarify that there are four different buildings that store material for the Archives, but "those who claimed that 99.9% of the material was saved were uninformed and wrong." Numerous organizations and foreign archives have offered to help with the restoration, and the Turkish agency TIKA has taken an initiative to assist with the preservation of the remaining documents.

Seven of the rioters in Sarajevo were suspected of having started the fire; two (Salem Hatibović and Nihad Trnka) were arrested. On 4 April 2014, both were released (although still under suspicion of terrorism), on conditions that they don't leave their places of residence and abstain from having any contact with each other. Both were also mandated to report to the police once every week.

== Consequences ==
Economic

Mitsubishi Hitachi Power Systems is believed to have stopped investment into Tuzla Thermal Power Plant, due to city riots and political situation thereafter.

== Reactions ==
=== Domestic ===
- Federation of Bosnia and Herzegovina—On 7 February 2014, the Federation Prime Minister Nermin Nikšić held a press conference, with prosecutors, and accused hooligans of creating chaos. Bakir Izetbegović, one of the country's three presidents and leader of the Party of Democratic Action said, "I believe that people want a change of power. I believe that within three months we should offer citizens a chance to choose who they trust, because it's obvious that this isn't working anymore." Bosnian minister Zlatko Lagumdžija said, "Now, it is time for citizens to talk and for politicians to listen in silence. We should create a dialogue environment in Bosnia and Herzegovina."
- Republika Srpska—President Milorad Dodik has expressed that he is "proud of the citizens in Republika Srpska" for not falling for provocations that could make the unrests in the Federation entity of BiH spread further. He has also expressed suspicions that there might be an underlying political project that intends to somehow make the recent unrests expand into Republika Srpska entity of BiH.

=== Supranational ===
- European Union—Spokesman for the European Commissioner for Enlargement and European Neighbourhood Policy Štefan Füle called for protesters and police to avoid resorting to violence. On 18 February, Füle, disappointed with the results of talks with the leaders of seven most influential political parties in Bosnia and Herzegovina, decided to end his pursuit in trying to make a deal to put the Sejdić–Finci verdict into effect. "It is time for the Bosnia and Herzegovina's institutions to take matters into their own hands and solve the issue. The implementation of the verdict is the key of Bosnia and Herzegovina's advancement to EU membership, but also the protection of the rights of its citizens," Füle said.

=== International ===
- Austria—High Representative for Bosnia, Austrian Valentin Inzko, said that Austria will increase its number of troops in Bosnia, and if the situation worsens, he will bring in more EU troops.
- Croatia—Croatia has called for an immediate cessation of violence in Bosnia and Herzegovina. Croatian ministry of Foreign and European Affairs stated: 'We are worriedly monitoring the development of events in Bosnia and Herzegovina and calling for urgent cessation of conflicts and violence. We call for all parties to establish a mutual communication because European, stable and prosperous Bosnia and Herzegovina is in the interest of all its citizens. Bosnia and Herzegovina has a perspective of being an EU member state and should resolve its conflicts in the spirit of one.'

Croatian president Ivo Josipović commented on the riots while away at the Winter Olympics in Sochi. "I wish for our neighbours and friends to have the current situation [in the country] calm down as soon as possible. It's paramount that all of the social problems be solved within the democratic institutions and I hope that will be the case with Bosnia and Herzegovina, too," president Josipović said.

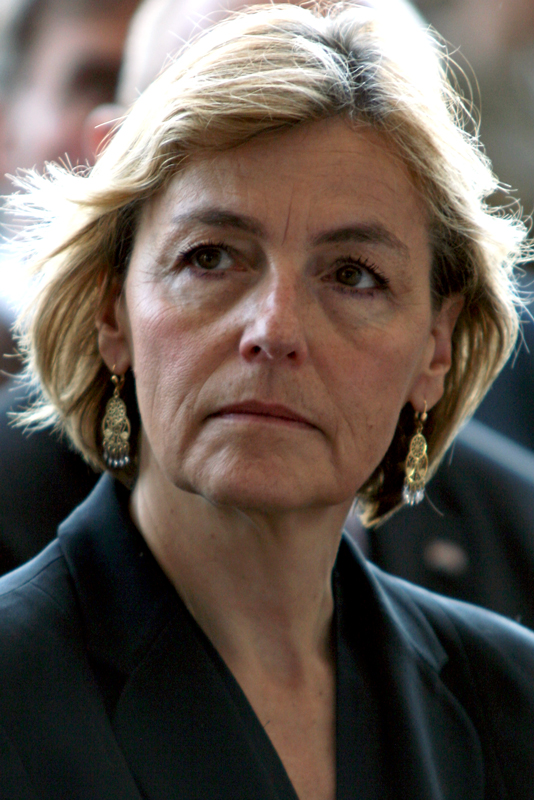
Vesna Pusić, Croatian Minister of Foreign and European Affairs

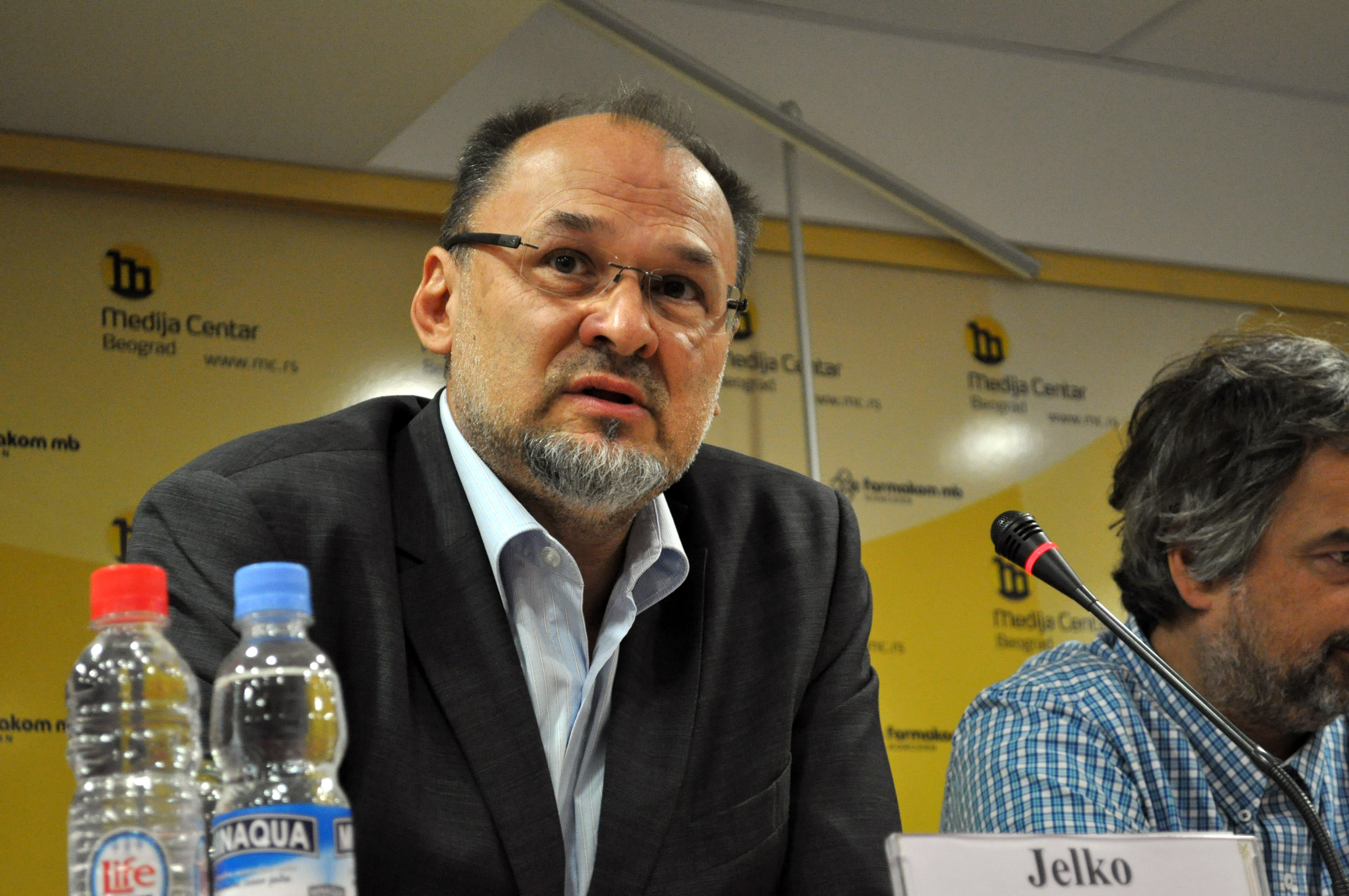
Jelko Kacin, Slovenian MEP

Two politicians who have conflicting opinions about potential EU accession for Bosnia and Herzegovina

Croatian Foreign and European affairs minister Vesna Pusić said that "Bosnia and Herzegovina has, unlike some other difficult cases at this moment, a guaranteed European perspective; it has a confirmed path in front of it towards European integrates. I think that, even with all of the hardships, it is something which has a wide support as a direction of development for Bosnia and Herzegovina among its citizens, and thus I think it would be necessary to find a method of communication as soon as possible." She added she would be speaking about the situation on 10 February, in Brussels at the foreign affairs ministers' meeting. On 10 February, Pusić suggested to open the "prenegotiations" with Bosnia and Herzegovina to have them join the EU but there is no indication that the consensus has been reached on the matter. The European Commission stated that the implementing of the Sejdić–Finci verdict as the immovable condition of the Bosnia and Herzegovina's path towards the EU is "not the most productive of the ideas." However, they stated that the implementation of the verdict is very important for progress. On the other hand, in the European Parliament, Jelko Kacin, Slovenian MEP openly opposed Pusić's suggestion in front of the EU high representative Catherine Ashton, saying he is "against allowing Bosnia and Herzegovina a fast track towards the EU, because it would suit the political elite of Bosnia and Herzegovina, the very act which led its citizens to the edge of the abyss. Furthermore, the Sejdić–Finci verdict is about human rights, and your country, Croatia, knows all too well it's not possible to skip over steps towards the EU when we're talking about human rights." Kacin also commented it's hard to speak of opening the negotiations when Bosnia and Herzegovina's politicians can't decide whether or not to export milk, since one of the entities refuses to make the veterinary service state-level. "The matter could be resolved in a blink of an eye, but they cannot agree. And if they can't solve even that, how can we even talk about fast tracking?," Kacin said. Upon being asked a question if the EU is thinking about abolishing the Republika Srpska, Pusić said for the press that that isn't the way EU works. "EU is not an officer nor someone who can impose the inner arrangement of the country but it can create the conditions which attract people to the country. Not as a police officer, but through a soft power," said Pusić, adding she would be giving the details of the Bosnia and Herzegovina EU negotiation start plan to the diplomats in the EU institutions and afterwards to the public.
European Parliament member Davor Ivo Stier from the Croatian Democratic Union also commented on the situation in Bosnia and Herzegovina. "When people who set things on fire in Mostar are yelling 'This is Bosnia!,' it incredibly reminds me of the Chetniks during the aggression against Croatia yelling 'This is Serbia.'. When Zlatko Lagumdžija accuses the European Parliament because of a resolution which condemns centralism, it is clear just how much the centralist elites are against the European peace project. Croatia and the EU cannot be passive towards this downward spiral of violence in Bosnia and Herzegovina. It is time to show leadership. End to centralism! End to violence! It's time for a European path of Bosnia and Herzegovina!," he commented the riots in Bosnia and Herzegovina on his Facebook profile.
Prime minister Zoran Milanović visited Mostar, which was criticised in the capital Sarajevo, due to the expectations of the Croatian prime minister first visiting the capital city. In an interview with Večernji list, Minister of Security of Bosnia and Herzegovina Fahrudin Radončić said he would prefer if Milanović visited Sarajevo first but believed he had his best intentions in mind.
Robert Bubalo, Večernji list's columnist, wrote how it is peculiar that nobody protested the arrival of Turkish Foreign Minister Ahmet Davutoğlu, since "his own government forcefully repressed protests with violence and bloodshed last year, his government which is corrupt and which hunts down intellectuals such as Orhan Pamuk. No one to even ask him what Erdoğan meant by saying 'Sarajevo is ours and Anatolia yours.' Imagine the reactions in Sarajevo if a celebrity, even a singer, said 'Mostar is ours, Lika is yours.'" He concluded by saying Milanović would be of greater help to Bosnia and Herzegovina as a prime minister of an EU member state, unlike the Turkish Foreign Minister.

- Germany—Christian Schwarz-Schilling who was the high representative for Bosnia and Herzegovina and observed the signing of the Dayton Peace Accords that ended the Bosnian War on 14 December 1995, has said, "The politics that they have practiced must be stopped immediately. The privileges they [politicians] have enjoyed for too long from old times now must be curtailed. But this would necessitate involvement from the international community. And I don't see that coming. It's just like with Ukraine. There, the international community woke up only after a critical situation arose. The same thing will happen in Bosnia."
- Luxembourg—Deputy Prime Minister of Luxembourg Jean Asselborn dramatized the current situation further by stating, "We support all those who want stability in Bosnia and Herzegovina. The citizens have spoken. Bosnia is the biggest problem that European Union has in the Balkan region. We must defend the principle that Bosnia is one nation and never to be partitioned into three or four entities. I hope there are enough of those people in the European Union and Bosnia itself who want Bosnia to take the right path."
- Serbia—Serbia's Deputy Prime Minister and current President Aleksandar Vučić said, "There is no need to solve political problems by setting buildings on fire, using violence and beating up police. Serbia wants stability in the region, and thinks that is of essential importance."
- Turkey—Turkish Foreign Minister Ahmet Davutoğlu made his appeal during a visit to Sarajevo, stating, "Today is the day to act in Bosnia and we must not wait any longer. Bosnia urgently needs international aid in the form of a new package of political and economic reforms. The Dayton peace agreement was of outmost importance for it helped end the war but it now hampers the functioning of the country."
- United States—The US Embassy in Sarajevo issued a statement stating politicians should listen to the protesters and authorities should end the violence. "The use of violence distracts attention from the fundamental message we see the vast majority of protesters trying to make—that reform is necessary now," the statement said.
- United Kingdom—British Foreign Secretary William Hague demands stagnation in Bosnian politics and government to come to an end, stating, "What happened in Bosnia is a wake-up call. We need to focus more efforts on helping Bosnia towards the EU, towards NATO membership, so that the stagnation in Bosnian politics and government can come to an end, and I think it's probably going to become a more important issue over the coming months."

== Gallery ==
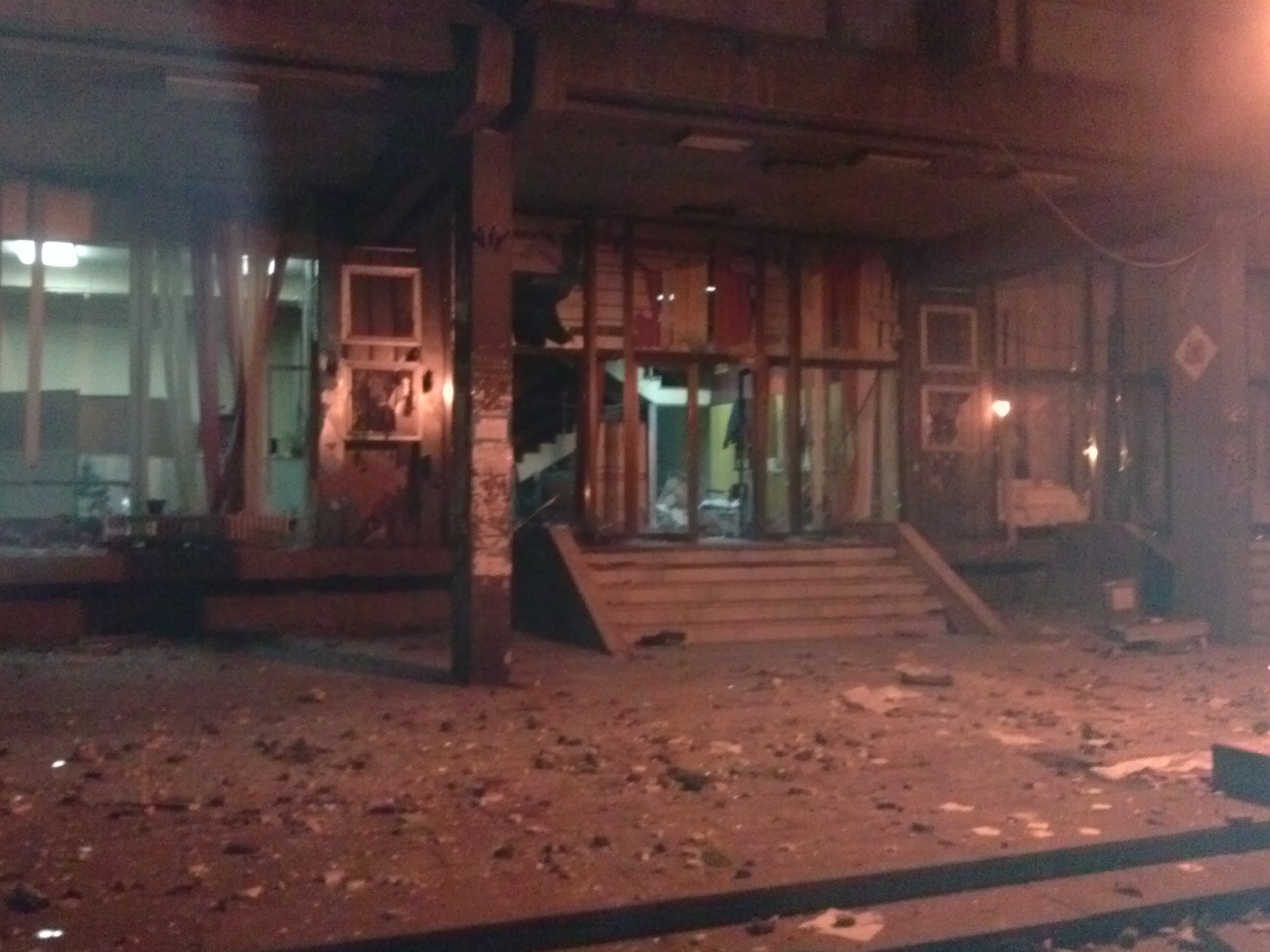
Municipality building in Zenica after the Bosnian social riots

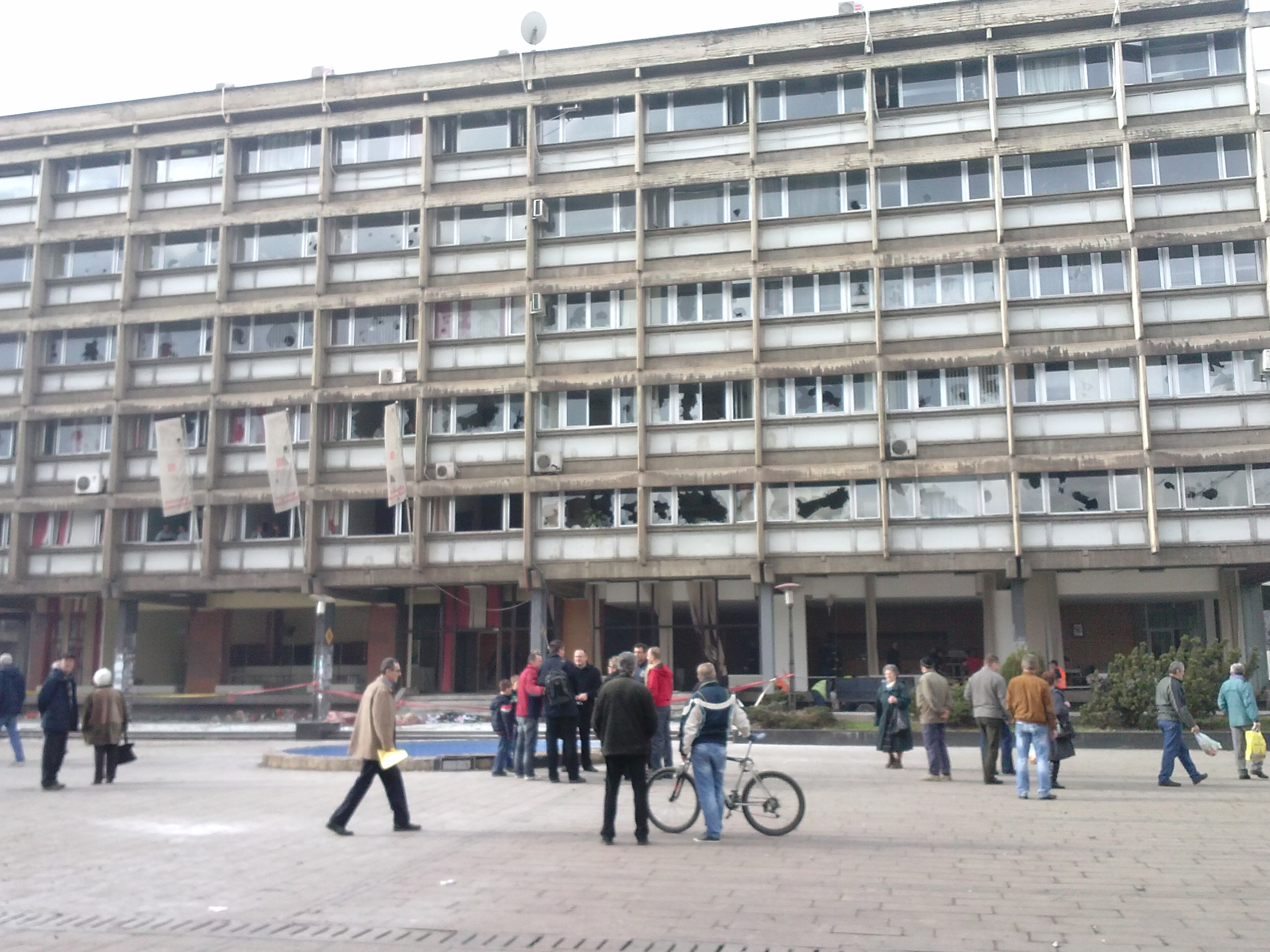
Municipality Zenica building the day after the riot in February 2014

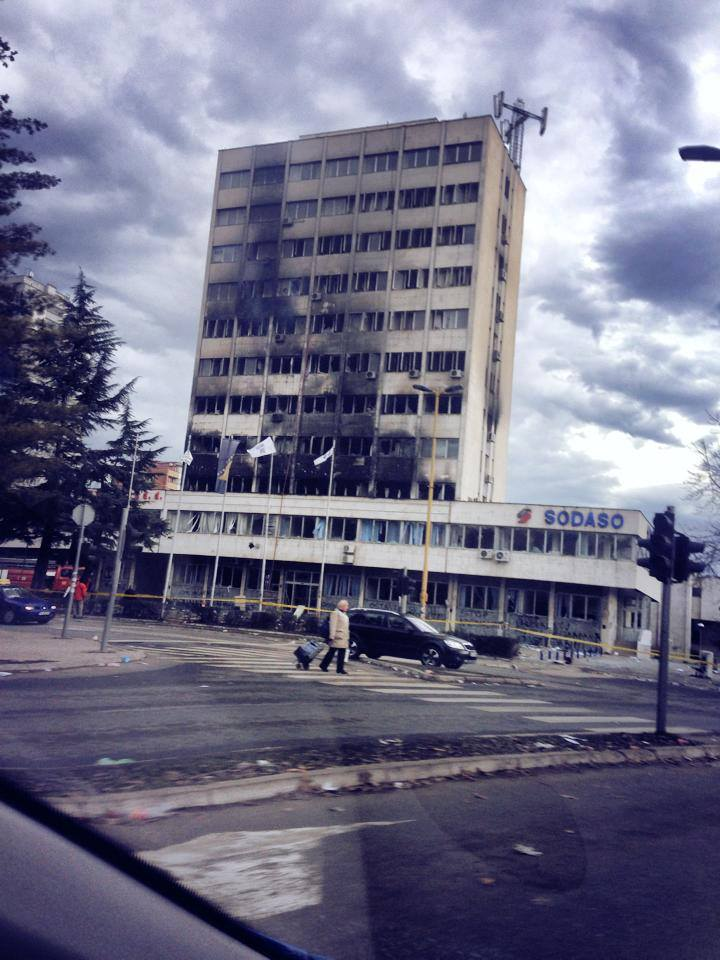
View at the Government Building of Tuzla Canton day after it was burned down; date: 8 February 2014

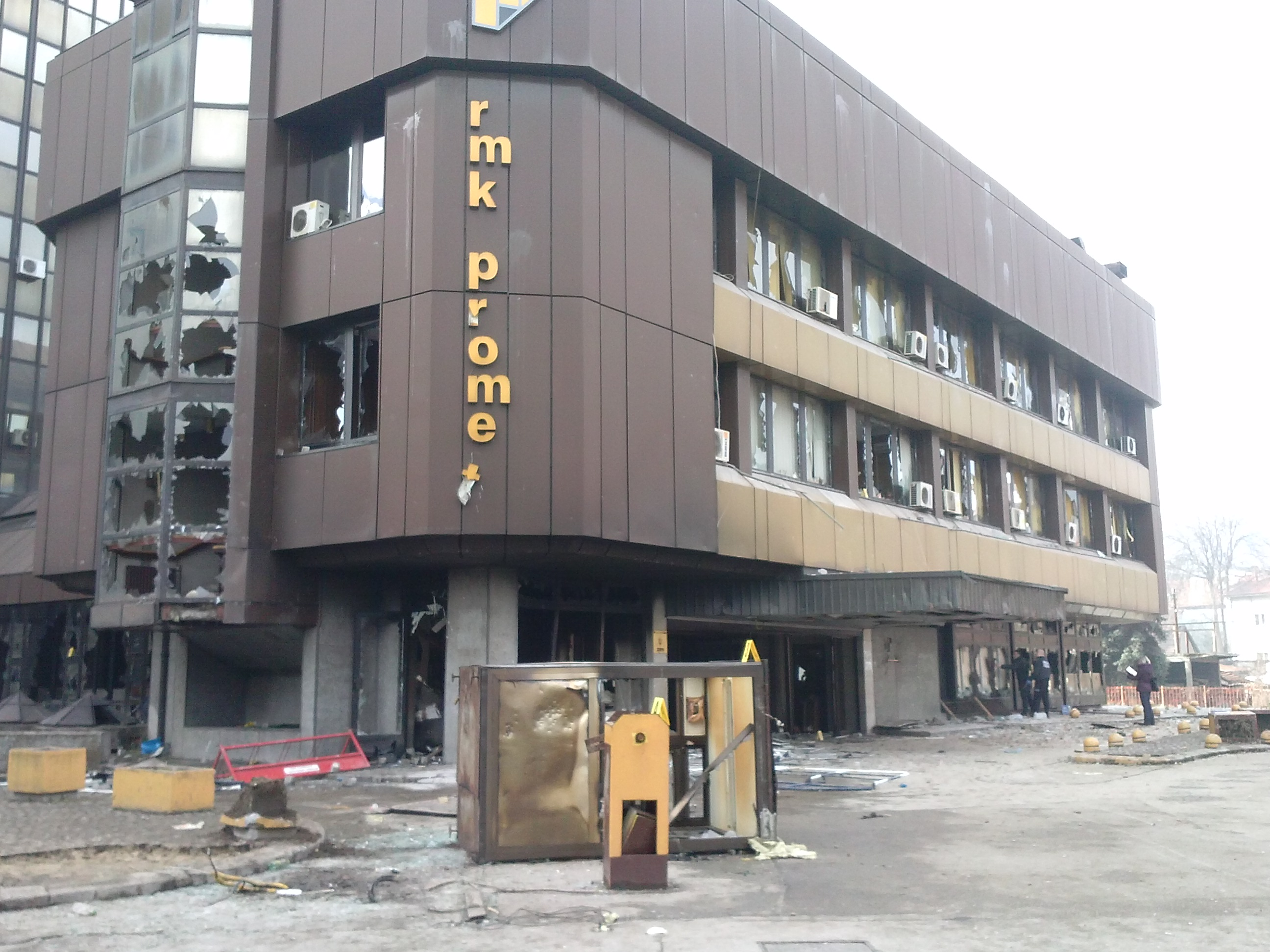
Zenica-Doboj Canton building the day after the riot in February 2014
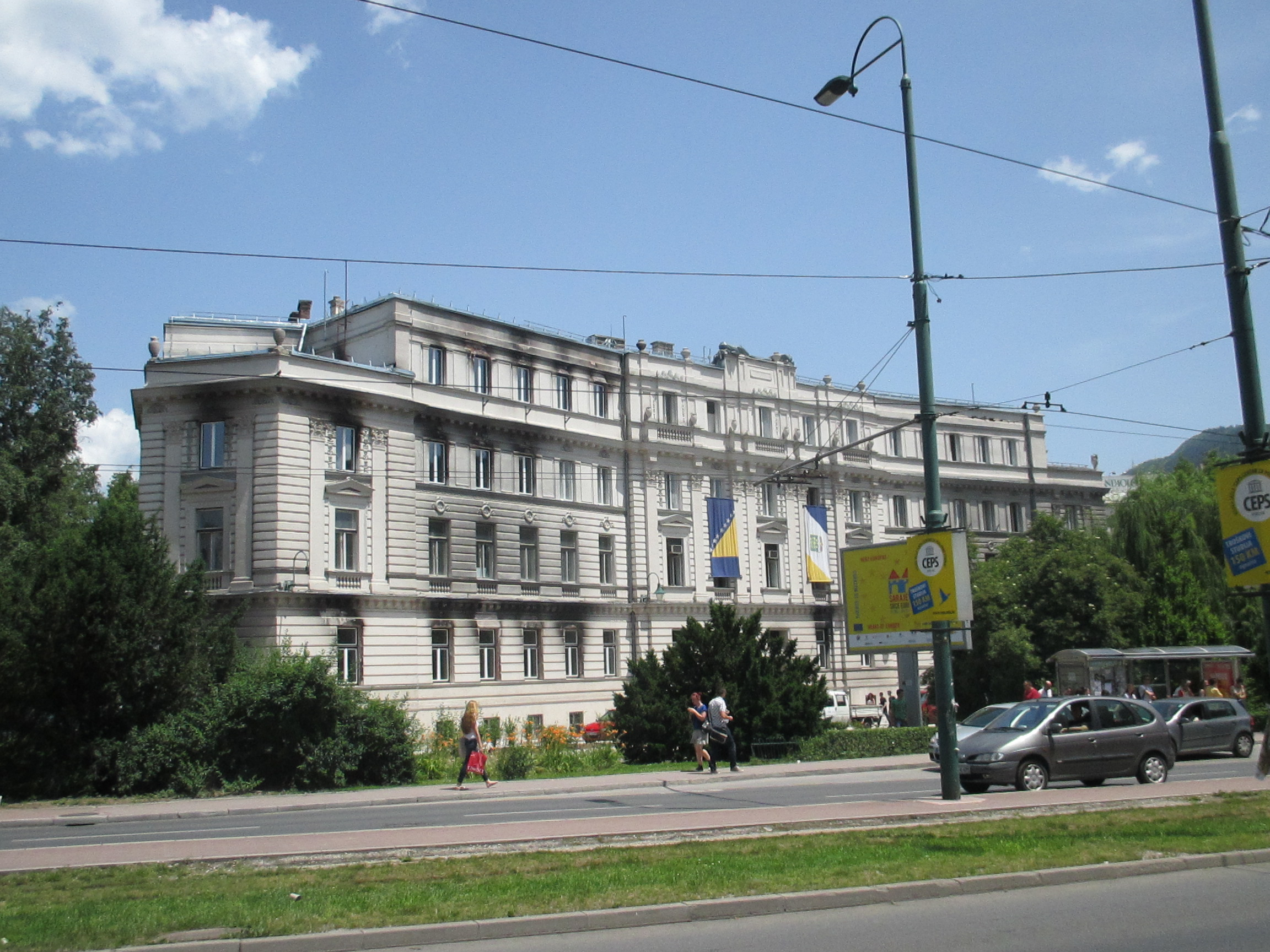
The building of Kanton Sarajevo in June 2014, still bearing the marks of the February riots

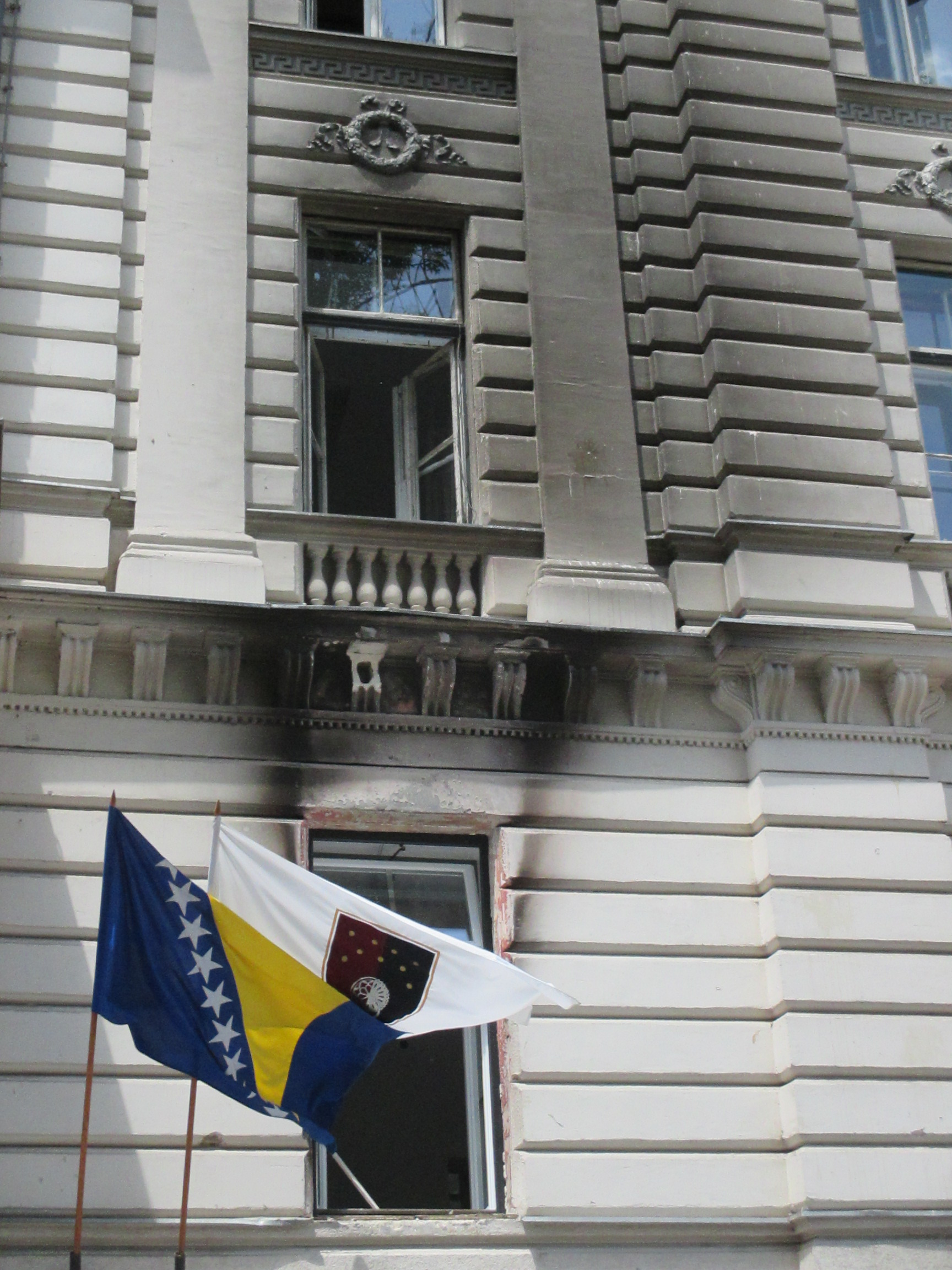
The building of Kanton Sarajevo in June 2014, still bearing the marks of the February riots

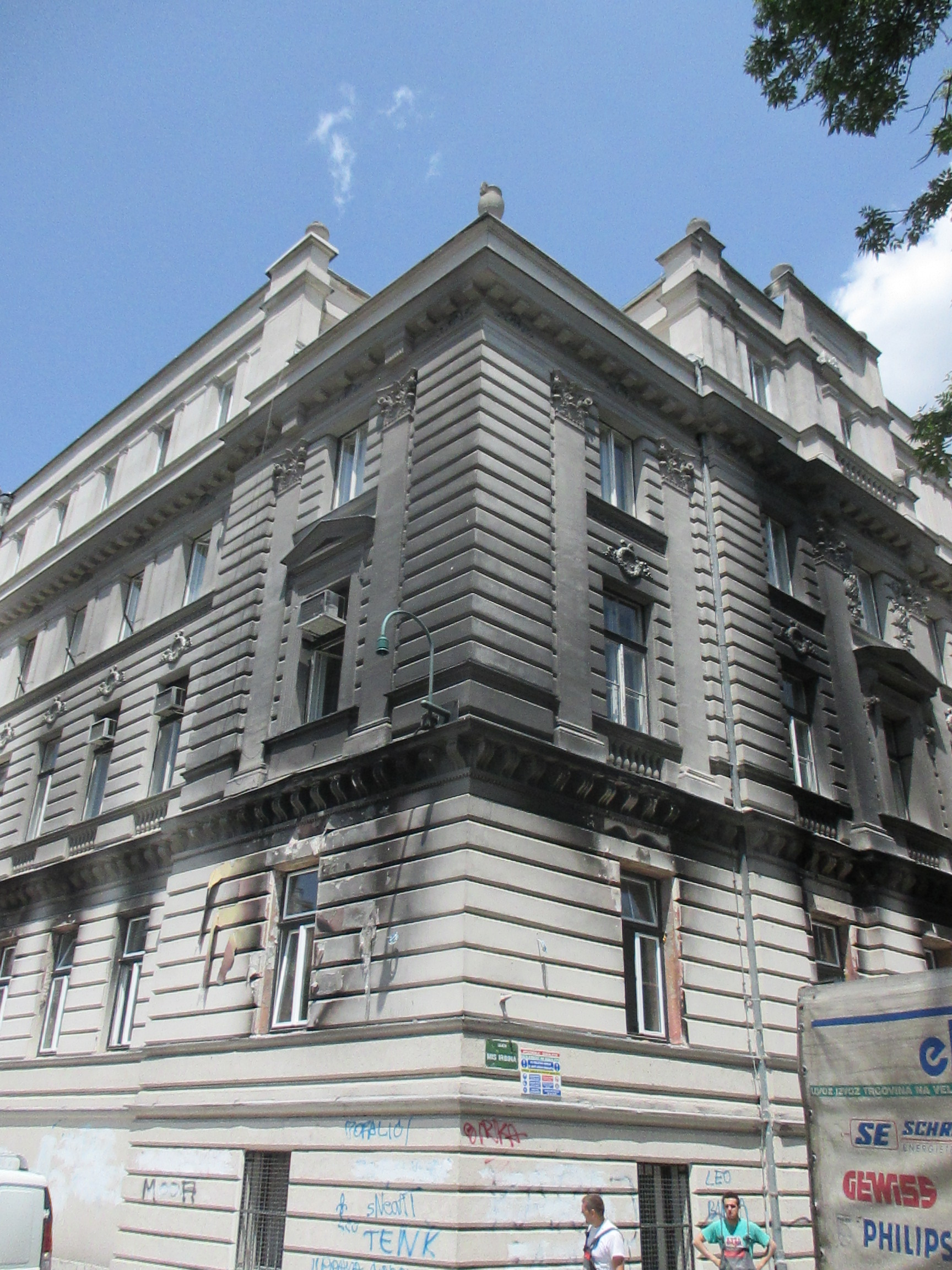
The building of Kanton Sarajevo in June 2014, still bearing the marks of the February riots

== See also ==
- Economy of Bosnia and Herzegovina
- History of Bosnia and Herzegovina
- Cazin uprising
- Husino uprising
- Spring (political terminology)
- List of protests in the 21st century
