= List of members of the Presidency of Yugoslavia =

This article lists the members of the Presidency of Yugoslavia, the collective head of state of the Socialist Federal Republic of Yugoslavia from 1971 until the country's dissolution in 1991/92.

Formed by the 1971 amendments to the 1963 Yugoslav Constitution, the Presidency of Yugoslavia originally had 23 members – three from each republic, two from each autonomous province and President of the Republic Josip Broz Tito. The 1974 Yugoslav Constitution reorganized the Presidency, reducing it to 9 members – one from each republic and autonomous province and, until 1988, leader of the League of Communists of Yugoslavia ex officio. The 1974 Constitution provided for the office of President of the Presidency, but only coming into effect with the disestablishment of the office of President of the Republic. A separate article affirmed Josip Broz Tito with an unlimited mandate which ensured the new President of the Presidency would not come into effect until after his death, which occurred on 4 May 1980.

== List ==
=== SR Bosnia and Herzegovina members ===
League of Communists of Yugoslavia

No.	Member of the Presidency		Lifespan	Term of office		Party	Notes
NA		Hamdija Pozderac	1924–1988	30 June 1971	15 May 1974	League of Communists of Yugoslavia	
NA	Ratomir Dugonjić	Ratomir Dugonjić	1916–1987	30 June 1971	15 May 1974	League of Communists of Yugoslavia	
NA		Augustin Papić	1917–2002	30 June 1971	15 May 1974	League of Communists of Yugoslavia	
1	Cvijetin Mijatović	Cvijetin Mijatović	1913–1993	15 May 1974	15 May 1984	League of Communists of Yugoslavia	President of the Presidency: 15 May 1980 – 15 May 1981.
2	Branko Mikulić	Branko Mikulić	1928–1994	15 May 1984	15 May 1986	League of Communists of Yugoslavia	Left the Presidency to accept role of President of the Federal Executive Council.
3		Hamdija Pozderac	1924–1988	15 May 1986	15 September 1987	League of Communists of Yugoslavia	Resigned due to accusation of participation in the Agrokomerc scandal.
N/A	Mato Andrić	Mato Andrić	1928–2015	15 September 1987	31 December 1987	League of Communists of Yugoslavia	Acting member of the Presidency as President of the Presidency of SR Bosnia and Herzegovina.
4	Raif Dizdarević	Raif Dizdarević	1926–2026	31 December 1987	15 May 1989	League of Communists of Yugoslavia	President of the Presidency: 15 May 1988 – 15 May 1989.
5		Bogić Bogićević	1953–	15 May 1989	27 April 1992	League of Communists of Yugoslavia	

=== SR Croatia members ===
League of Communists of Yugoslavia Croatian Democratic Union

No.	Member of the Presidency		Lifespan	Term of office		Party	Notes
NA	Jakov Blažević	Jakov Blažević	1912–1996	30 June 1971	15 May 1974	League of Communists of Yugoslavia	
NA		Đuro Kladarin	1915–1996	30 June 1971	15 May 1974	League of Communists of Yugoslavia	
NA	Miko Tripalo	Miko Tripalo	1926–1995	30 June 1971	December; 1971	League of Communists of Yugoslavia	Removed from his position by decision of the 21st meeting of the Presidency of the League of Communists of Yugoslavia due to his role in the Croatian Spring.
NA	Milan Mišković	Milan Mišković	1918–1978	December; 1971	15 May 1974	League of Communists of Yugoslavia	Replaced Miko Tripalo after his removal from politics.
1	Vladimir Bakarić	Vladimir Bakarić	1912–1983	15 May 1974	16 January 1983	League of Communists of Yugoslavia	Died in office.
2	Mika Špiljak	Mika Špiljak	1916–2007	16 January 1983	15 May 1984	League of Communists of Yugoslavia	President of the Presidency: 15 May 1983 – 15 May 1984
3	Josip Vrhovec	Josip Vrhovec	1926–2006	15 May 1984	15 May 1989	League of Communists of Yugoslavia	
4		Stipe Šuvar	1936–2004	15 May 1989	19 October 1990	League of Communists of Yugoslavia	Also served as member of the presidency ex officio 30 June 1988 – 25 November 1988 as President of the Presidency of the League of Communists of Yugoslavia. He was recalled by Parliament after the first multi-party elections in 1990.
5	Stjepan Mesić	Stjepan Mesić	1934–	19 October 1990	5 December 1991	Croatian Democratic Union	President of the Presidency: 30 June 1991 – 5 December 1991

=== SR Serbia members ===
League of Communists of Yugoslavia Socialist Party of Serbia

No.	Member of the Presidency		Lifespan	Term of office		Party	Notes
NA	Dragoslav Marković	Dragoslav Marković	1920–2005	30 June 1971	15 May 1974	League of Communists of Yugoslavia	
NA	Dobrivoje Vidić	Dobrivoje Vidić	1918–1992	30 June 1971	15 May 1974	League of Communists of Yugoslavia	
NA	Koča Popović	Koča Popović	1908–1992	30 June 1971	1972	League of Communists of Yugoslavia	Resigned out of solidarity with cadres removed in the Purge of liberals in Serbia.
NA	Dragi Stamenković	Dragi Stamenković	1920–2004	1972	15 May 1974	League of Communists of Yugoslavia	Replaced Koča Popović after his withdrawal from politics.
1	Petar Stambolić	Petar Stambolić	1912–2007	15 May 1974	15 May 1984	League of Communists of Yugoslavia	President of the Presidency: 15 May 1982 – 15 May 1983
2	Nikola Ljubičić	Nikola Ljubičić	1916–2005	15 May 1984	15 May 1989	League of Communists of Yugoslavia	
4	Borisav Jović	Borisav Jović	1928–2021	15 May 1989	27 April 1992	League of Communists of Yugoslavia (until January 1990)	President of the Presidency: 15 May 1990 – 15 May 1991
	Borisav Jović	Borisav Jović	1928–2021	15 May 1989	27 April 1992	Socialist Party of Serbia (from January 1990)	President of the Presidency: 15 May 1990 – 15 May 1991

=== SR Slovenia members ===
League of Communists of Yugoslavia Liberal Democracy of Slovenia

No.	Member of the Presidency		Lifespan	Term of office		Party	Notes
NA	Sergej Kraigher	Sergej Kraigher	1914–2001	30 June 1971	15 May 1974	League of Communists of Yugoslavia	
NA	Marko Bulc	Marko Bulc	1926–2019	30 June 1971	15 May 1974	League of Communists of Yugoslavia	
NA	Mitja Ribičič	Mitja Ribičič	1919–2013	30 June 1971	15 May 1974	League of Communists of Yugoslavia	
1	Edvard Kardelj	Edvard Kardelj	1910–1979	15 May 1974	10 February 1979	League of Communists of Yugoslavia	Died in office.
2	Sergej Kraigher	Sergej Kraigher	1914–2001	February; 1979	15 May 1984	League of Communists of Yugoslavia	President of the Presidency: 15 May 1981 – 15 May 1982
3	Stane Dolanc	Stane Dolanc	1925–1999	15 May 1984	15 May 1989	League of Communists of Yugoslavia	
4	Janez Drnovšek	Janez Drnovšek	1950–2008	15 May 1989	25 June 1991	League of Communists of Yugoslavia (until February 1990)	President of the Presidency: 15 May 1989 – 15 May 1990
	Janez Drnovšek	Janez Drnovšek	1950–2008	15 May 1989	25 June 1991	Liberal Democracy of Slovenia (from February 1990)	President of the Presidency: 15 May 1989 – 15 May 1990

=== SR Macedonia members ===
League of Communists of Yugoslavia

No.	Member of the Presidency		Lifespan	Term of office		Party	Notes
NA	Nikola Minčev	Nikola Minčev	1915–1997	30 June 1971	15 May 1974	League of Communists of Yugoslavia	
NA	Krste Crvenkovski	Krste Crvenkovski	1921–2001	30 June 1971	15 May 1974	League of Communists of Yugoslavia	
NA	Kiro Gligorov	Kiro Gligorov	1917–2012	30 June 1971	1972	League of Communists of Yugoslavia	
NA	Lazar Koliševski	Lazar Koliševski	1914–2000	1972	15 May 1974	League of Communists of Yugoslavia	
1	Lazar Koliševski	Lazar Koliševski	1914–2000	15 May 1974	15 May 1984	League of Communists of Yugoslavia	President of the Presidency: 4 May 1980 – 15 May 1980
2	Lazar Mojsov	Lazar Mojsov	1920–2011	15 May 1984	15 May 1989	League of Communists of Yugoslavia	President of the Presidency: 15 May 1987 – 15 May 1988
3	Vasil Tupurkovski	Vasil Tupurkovski	1951–	15 May 1989	8 September 1991	League of Communists of Yugoslavia	

=== SR Montenegro members ===
League of Communists of Yugoslavia Democratic Party of Socialists of Montenegro

No.	Member of the Presidency		Lifespan	Term of office		Party	Notes
NA	Vidoje Žarković	Vidoje Žarković	1927–2000	30 June 1971	15 May 1974	League of Communists of Yugoslavia	
NA	Veljko Mićunović	Veljko Mićunović	1916–1982	30 June 1971	15 May 1974	League of Communists of Yugoslavia	
NA	Dobroslav Ćulafić	Dobroslav Ćulafić	1926–2011	30 June 1971	15 May 1974	League of Communists of Yugoslavia	
1	Vidoje Žarković	Vidoje Žarković	1927–2000	15 May 1974	15 May 1984	League of Communists of Yugoslavia	
2	Veselin Đuranović	Veselin Đuranović	1925–1997	15 May 1984	15 May 1989	League of Communists of Yugoslavia	President of the Presidency: 15 May 1984 – 15 May 1985
3		Nenad Bućin	1935–2013	15 May 1989	16 March 1991	League of Communists of Yugoslavia	Resigned.
4	Branko Kostić	Branko Kostić	1939–2020	16 March 1991	27 April 1992	Democratic Party of Socialists of Montenegro	

=== SAP Vojvodina members ===
League of Communists of Yugoslavia Socialist Party of Serbia

No.	Member of the Presidency		Lifespan	Term of office		Party	Notes
NA		Ilija Rajačić	1923–2005	30 June 1971	1973	League of Communists of Yugoslavia	
NA		Sreten Kovačević	1920–1995	1973	15 May 1974	League of Communists of Yugoslavia	Replaced Ilija Rajačić.
NA	Maćaš Kelemen	Maćaš Kelemen	1921–2003	30 June 1971	1973	League of Communists of Yugoslavia	
NA		Ida Szabo	1915–2016	1973	15 May 1974	League of Communists of Yugoslavia	Replaced Maćaš Keleman.
1	Stevan Doronjski	Stevan Doronjski	1918–1981	15 May 1974	14 August 1981	League of Communists of Yugoslavia	Died in office.
2	Radovan Vlajković	Radovan Vlajković	1922–2001	August; 1981	15 May 1989	League of Communists of Yugoslavia	President of the Presidency: 15 May 1985 – 15 May 1986
3	Dragutin Zelenović	Dragutin Zelenović	1928–2020	15 May 1989	December; 1990	League of Communists of Yugoslavia	Left the Presidency to accept role of Prime Minister of Serbia.
4		Jugoslav Kostić	1939–2025	December; 1990	27 April 1992	Socialist Party of Serbia	

=== SAP Kosovo members ===
League of Communists of Yugoslavia Socialist Party of Serbia

No.	Member of the Presidency		Lifespan	Term of office		Party	Notes
NA	Ilaz Kurteshi	Ilaz Kurteshi	1927–2016	30 June 1971	15 May 1974	League of Communists of Yugoslavia	
NA		Veli Deva	1923–2015	30 June 1971	15 May 1974	League of Communists of Yugoslavia	
1	Fadil Hoxha	Fadil Hoxha	1916–2001	15 May 1974	15 May 1984	League of Communists of Yugoslavia	
2		Sinan Hasani	1922–2010	15 May 1984	15 May 1989	League of Communists of Yugoslavia	President of the Presidency: 15 May 1986 – 15 May 1987
3		Riza Sapunxhiu	1925–2008	15 May 1989	21 March 1991	League of Communists of Yugoslavia	He was recalled by Serbian Parliament.
4	Sejdo Bajramović	Sejdo Bajramović	1927–1993	21 March 1991	27 April 1992	Socialist Party of Serbia	

== See also ==
- President of the Presidency of Yugoslavia
- Vice President of the Presidency of Yugoslavia
