= Brano Miljuš =

- Брано Миљуш

Member of National Assembly (Serbia)

Personal details
- Born: 15 January 1950 (age 76) Sanski Most, SR BiH, SFR Yugoslavia
- Party: SKJ
- Children: Branko
- Education: University of Sarajevo
- Occupation: lawyer
- Profession: politician
- Website: eukallos.edu.ba/prof-dr-brano-miljus/

Brano Miljuš (born 15 January 1950 in Sanski Most, SR BiH, SFR Yugoslavia) is a Serbian politician and academic from Bosnia-Herzegovina.

Former high-ranking official of the Yugoslav Communist League' (SKJ) Bosnia-Herzegovina branch, he was most recently a member of Alliance of Independent Social Democrats (SNSD).

In early 1999, he became the Prime Minister elect of Republika Srpska, Serbian entity in Bosnia-Herzegovina.

== Biography ==
=== Education ===
He began his education in his hometown Sanski Most, where he finished high school. After that, he enrolled at the Faculty of Political Sciences „Veljko Vlahović“ in Sarajevo, where he graduated and was later elected as an assistant, then as a senior assistant at the same faculty, in the period from 1974 to 1980.

From 2003 to 2014, he worked as an assistant professor, and later as an associate professor, at the Pan-European University in Banjaluka „Apeiron“, where he taught international law and European Union law. In addition, he also lectured at the Singidunum University in Belgrade, where he taught subjects related to international law and EU law.

==== Quarrel over a job position ====
Miljuš competed with Vojislav Šešelj for the position of assistant at the Sarajevo Faculty. What initially seemed like a purely scientific issue turned into a political dispute with the government of the then SR Bosnia and Herzegovina, especially with the leading figures of the ZK BiH, Branko Mikulić and Hamdija Pozderac, who supported Miljuš, whom Šešelj accused of copying his doctoral dissertation in part from Edvard Kardelj. Miljuš and Šešelj competed for the same assistant position at the faculty, and the promising young Miljuš won it.

Vojislav Šešelj himself later admitted that his goal at the time was neither the alleged plagiarism nor the competitor Brane Miljuš, but that he wanted to divert the attention of the Central Committee of the League of Communists of Bosnia and Herzegovina from Nenad Kecmanović:

Ja sam krenuo direktno na Pozderca

„To je bio način da pomognem Nenadu Kecmanoviću, protiv koga je krenula lavina optužbi iz Centralnog komiteta zbog njegovih napisa u beogradskom „Ninu“, pa sam ja na taj način pravio neku ravnotežu i krenuo direktno na Hamdiju Pozderca, što je Hamdija i shvatio.“

I headed straight for Pozderac.

"It was a way to help Nenad Kecmanović, against whom a series of accusations were launched from the Central Committee because of his articles in Belgrade's magazine "NIN", that's why I created a kind of balance and turned directly to Hamdija Pozderac, which he understood."

It is assumed that this resentment, as well as Šešelj's ultranationalist orientation, as well as the Marxist bias of the court, ultimately led to his expulsion from the faculty, surveillance by the UDBA (State Security Service), and, on top of that, "earned" him a lengthy eight-year prison sentence. He was convicted on 9 July 1984 for acting with what the verdict stated were "anarcho-liberal and nationalist views", thereby committing "the criminal act of endangering social order". The trial used witness statements from private conversations and the unpublished text of a questionnaire entitled "Шта да се ради?" The Supreme Court of the SFRY gradually reduced the sentence, so that he ultimately served almost two years and was released in 1986.

=== Political activity ===
In his early political activity, Miljuš was associated with the Youth organization and the League of Communists, and established contacts with important figures of the time. He was the president of the Socialist Youth of Bosnia and Herzegovina (SSOBiH), and later the secretary of the city committee of the League of Communists in Sarajevo.

Brano Miljuš was the last bearer of Relay of Youth, which was lowered onto his funeral pyre after the death of Josip Broz on May 4 in 1980, i.e. before the Day of Youth, which was celebrated with the handing over of the baton to Tito in Belgrade on 25 May, his birthday. The decision that Miljuš, then president of the Youth of Bosnia and Herzegovina, would be in charge of this symbolic moment on the day of the funeral was made because the baton was in Bosnia and Herzegovina at the time of Tito's death (4 May 1980) and its journey was practically stopped. The somewhat unusual decision to hand over the baton to Tito's dead body was made by the presidium of the League of Communists of Yugoslavia, which was informed by the then member of the presidium, Nikola Stojanović.

Between 1980 and 1989, he worked at the Ministry of Foreign Affairs of Yugoslavia, where he held important positions, including the position of deputy minister. During this period, he was also active in the political life of Yugoslavia, as he was also a member of the Federal Assembly of the Socialist Federal Republic of Yugoslavia (SFRY).

This period was a time of great political and social changes, both on a global level and within Yugoslavia, which faced increasing challenges in its final years. Mutual friction, unresolved international issues, and Pan-Serbian nationalism led to the Disintegration of Yugoslavia through a fratricidal civil war. Formally, this disintegration began on 25 June 1991 with the declarations of independence and sovereignty by Slovenia and Croatia from Belgrade.
