= Nezir Pivić =

Bosnian university professor and politician

Nezir Pivić (born 4 July 1983) is a Bosnian university professor and politician of the Party of Democratic Action (SDA). He was appointed Prime Minister of the Zenica-Doboj Canton in October 2023.

== Early life and education ==
Born in Zenica in 1983, Pivić graduated from the Faculty of Criminal Justice Sciences at the University of Sarajevo in 2006. Since 2007, he has been employed at the Faculty of Law at the University of Zenica, within the Department of Criminal Law. He earned his Master of Laws degree in 2009 and his Doctor of Laws degree in 2012. He served as teaching assistant, senior teaching assistant, and assistant professor before being appointed associate professor in November 2017.

Pivić is the author of three books and dozens of academic and professional papers in the field of criminal law.

== Political career ==
Pivić was named Deputy Minister of Justice of Bosnia and Herzegovina in April 2015. He was elected as a representative to the Federal House of Representatives in the 2022 election. He was appointed Prime Minister of the Zenica-Doboj Canton on 26 October 2023.

Within the Party of Democratic Action (SDA), Pivić has held several positions, including president of SDA Zenica since February 2018.

== Personal life ==
Pivić is married to Alma Pivić, a civil servant.
