= Munib Husejnagić =

Bosnian politician (born 1959)

Prime Minister of Zenica-Doboj Canton
- In office 20 June 2013 – 11 March 2015
- Preceded by: Fikret Plevljak
- Succeeded by: Miralem Galijašević

Personal details
- Born: 17 September 1959 (age 66) Žepče, SR Bosnia and Herzegovina, SFR Yugoslavia
- Party: Social Democratic Party

Munib Husejnagić (born 17 September 1959) is a Bosnian politician. He served as the Prime Minister of Zenica-Doboj Canton from 20 June 2013 until his forced resignation less than eight months later, amid the violent protests and riots in Bosnia and Herzegovina.

== Early life ==
Husejnagić was born in Žepče, a town in central Bosnia and Herzegovina.

== Political career ==
Husejnagić was elected as the prime minister of Zenica-Doboj Canton, one of Bosnia and Herzegovina's ten cantons, on 20 June 2013. The canton's previous prime minister resigned on 17 June 2013.

During the violent protests and riots in Bosnia and Herzegovina in February 2014, Husejnagić and the entire government of the Zenica-Doboj Canton were forced to resign by 6,000 protesters who threw eggs at the government at the government building and demanded his resignation, considering him to be a corrupt leader.

== Personal life ==
On 23 February 2015, Husejnagić was attacked and sustained minor injuries after being attacked by a man in a café.
