= Tatjana Ljujić-Mijatović =

Bosnian politician (born 1941)

- Татјана Љујић-Мијатовић

Serb member of the Presidency of the Republic of Bosnia and Herzegovina
- In office 24 December 1992 – 5 October 1996 Serving with Mirko Pejanović
- Preceded by: Nenad Kecmanović
- Succeeded by: Momčilo Krajišnik
Additional positions
Deputy Mayor of Sarajevo
In office 8 January 1998 – April 2000
Mayor	Rasim Gačanović

Personal details
- Born: Tatjana Ljujić; 11 May 1941 (age 85) Sarajevo, Independent State of Croatia (modern-day Bosnia and Herzegovina)
- Party: Social Democratic Party
- Children: 2, including Dunja
- Education: University of Sarajevo (BE, PhD); University of Belgrade (ME)

Tatjana "Tanja" Ljujić-Mijatović (Serbian Cyrillic: Татјана "Тања" Љујић-Мијатовић; born 11 May 1941) is a Bosnian former politician. By vocation, she is a horticulturist and landscape designer. During the Bosnian War, Ljujić-Mijatović served as the Serb member of the Presidency of the Republic of Bosnia and Herzegovina.

== Early life and education ==
Ljujić-Mijatović was born on 11 May 1941 into a Serb family in Sarajevo. Her father was a high-ranking commander in the Yugoslav Partisan resistance movement during World War II. She attended elementary school, high school, and university in Sarajevo.

Having graduated from the University of Sarajevo as an agriculture engineer in 1964, Ljujić-Mijatović obtained a master's degree in landscape design at the University of Belgrade in 1982, followed by a doctoral degree in Sarajevo in 1986. She worked as a landscape designer in Vienna from 1969 until 1971 and in Sarajevo from 1971 to 1979, and became a university professor in Mostar and Sarajevo in 1982.

== Political career ==
Ljujić-Mijatović became politically active during Bosnia and Herzegovina's socialist era. She became a delegate in the People's Assembly in 1991.

When the Bosnian War broke out in 1992, Ljujić-Mijatović rejected Serb nationalist politics, stayed in Sarajevo during the siege of the city by the Bosnian Serb army, and supported the preservation of a multiethnic Bosnia and Herzegovina. When Nenad Kecmanović resigned his post as Serb member of the Presidency of the Republic of Bosnia and Herzegovina in July 1992, Ljujić-Mijatović was the Serb delegate with most votes in the 1990 general election who was still residing in the government-controlled territory. Biljana Plavšić and Nikola Koljević had also resigned, and two delegates ahead of Ljujić-Mijatović left the country. She duly took her seat in the Presidency in December 1992, as the only woman among the seven members. In 1993, Ljujić-Mijatović gave an interview in Vienna about the life in besieged Sarajevo, which prompted Alois Mock, the Austrian Foreign Minister, to request that she be named Bosnian ambassador to the United Nations. During the Dayton negotiations, she resolutely opposed the division of Bosnia and Herzegovina.

Following the war, Ljujić-Mijatović remained a member of the Social Democratic Party. From 1998 until 2000, she was the deputy mayor of Sarajevo, and afterward served in the City Council. She is a member of the Serb Civic Council.

== Personal life ==
Ljujić-Mijatović is divorced. She has two daughters, including Dunja Mijatović (born in 1964).

Political offices
Preceded by Nenad Kecmanović	Serb member of the Presidency of the Republic of Bosnia and Herzegovina; 1992–1996; With: Mirko Pejanović	Succeeded by Momčilo Krajišnik
