= Agrokomerc =

Company of Yugoslavia

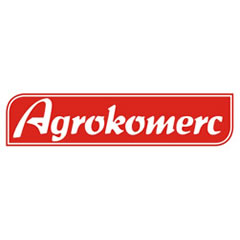
- Logo of Agrokomerc
- Type: Food
- Industry: Agriculture (farming and livestock); Food production (meat, dairy, baked goods, and processed foods); Poultry farming (egg and chicken production); Packaging and distribution of food products
- Founded: 1967; 59 years ago, in Velika Kladuša
- Founders: Fikret Abdić
- Headquarters: Velika Kladuša, Bosnia and Herzegovina
- Number of locations: 200+ (peak)
- Area served: Region of the former Yugoslavia
- Number of employees: 13,000+ (peak)

Agrokomerc is a food company headquartered in Velika Kladuša, Bosnia and Herzegovina with former operations extending across the entire area of former Yugoslavia. The company became internationally known in the late 1980s due to a corruption scandal known as the Agrokomerc Affair. During the war in Bosnia and Herzegovina, Fikret Abdić, the chief executive officer of the company, used his wealth and political influence to establish the Autonomous Province of Western Bosnia, an unrecognized state.

== Initial growth ==
Agrokomerc is located in an area that was put in an economic blockade by the Yugoslav Communist party immediately after World War II. At the time, the company consisted of one farm bordering Croatia.

Originally a small chicken farm with 30 employees, the company started to grow after its new president Fikret Abdić took over in 1967. Agrokomerc started to grow by making connections with farmers in surrounding areas, building chicken farms and providing jobs for thousands of unemployed people in the region.

Shortly after, Agrokomerc became the main subject in all aspects of local life. With positive influence on employees and the public, as well as with its own investments, Agrokomerc made this region into one of the most advanced regions in Yugoslavia. With its own resources, Agrokomerc built roads in the farthest parts of the region, provided water supply and electricity to the region. It also invested in the education system in order to procure highly educated employees.

By the 1980s the company had consisted of millions of chickens, thousands of turkeys, thousands of farmed rabbits, mayonnaise production, liquor production, deli meats, chocolate production, fungiculture, as well as ownership of cold and dry storage units. It grew to over 13,000 employees. It had its own trucks for distribution of products, a transport service for employees and the public, a strong reputation for quality of products all over Europe and Agrokomerc was considered to be a successful company and a food manufacturing giant.

== Agrokomerc Affair ==
The Agrokomerc Affair become public in August 1987, after an article published on 15 August 1987 in the Belgrade-based Borba newspaper, in which the company was accused of issuing promissory notes without coverage. The Executive Council of the SR Bosnia and Herzegovina also released a note regarding the case. Soon, a media campaign was launched against Fikret Abdić, and the brothers Hamdija and Hakija Pozderac, who were accused of political sponsorship for Abdić, and were considered main culprits for Abdić's entry into the financial system.

The Presidency of the Central Committee of the League of Communists of Bosnia and Herzegovina (CK SK BiH) held an extended session on 31 August 1987 discussing business irregularities of the SOUR Agrokomerc. Even in April, the Presidency of the CK SK BiH asked the republic institutions for checking the legitimate status within Agrokomerc. This request to the republic institutions was made after the Republic Secretariat of Internal Affairs (RSUP) warned about the wide phenomenon of business irregularities, misuse, bribery, corruption and inappropriate use of funds. The Presidency of the CK SK BiH asked the party organizations in Velika Kladuša and Cazin to refrain themselves from illegal doings and to analyze the complete status. However, due to noncooperation of the Agrokomerc business structures and refusal to give in the information, the Executive Council of the Assembly of the SR Bosnia and Herzegovina formed a special group in order to investigate the economic-financial state of Agrokomerc.

The finding of the special group shocked the whole Yugoslav public. The Central Committee of the SK BiH referred to the activities of the business departments of Agrokomerc as "anti-self-managing" and "technocratic", asking for expulsion of Fikret Abdić from the Central Committee, his dismissal from the Federal Council of the Yugoslav Assembly, and removal from the post of president of the business committee of Agrokomerc. The authorities demanded questioning regarding responsibility of communists in the Republic's Public Persecution, the State Accounting Service, the People's Bank and the Business Bank Sarajevo - Udružena banka (eng: United Bank), because they showed a lack of initiative in discovering irregularities and protecting the legality and the state property.

== In the war ==
When the war broke out in the 1990s, Abdić created the Autonomous Province of Western Bosnia, a de facto independent entity that existed in the northwestern corner of the Republic of Bosnia and Herzegovina between 1993 and 1995. Agrokomerc was the cornerstone of its economy.

== After the war ==
The original company folded after the war, but was re-established as Agrokomerc d.d Velika Kladuša by former workers in 1999 in cooperation with of the Sarajevo-based company Gadžo Komerc, which specialized in producing the Tops brand biscuits. Although the company exported its products to the United States, Australia and Canada, it struggled financially and was later brought under state control. Agrokomerc was auctioned by the state in 2014, but reported problems in attracting buyers.

In 2017, it was reported that the company had been acquired by AC Food, a company of the Sarajevo-based food and textile conglomerate AS Group and had recovered financially, continuing to produce biscuits, chocolate and other confectionery products, with plans for production of meat, poultry and eggs from 2018. Other products such as Maza hazelnut spread and Kremipan chocolate bar have been unveiled recently.

== See also ==
- List of companies of the Socialist Federal Republic of Yugoslavia
