= List of heads of the Zenica-Doboj Canton =

Prime Minister of Zenica-Doboj Canton
- Premijer Zeničko-dobojskog kantona
- Coat of arms of Zenica-Doboj Canton
- Incumbent; Nezir Pivić since 26 October 2023
- Appointer: Zenica-Doboj Cantonal Assembly
- Inaugural holder: Bedrudin Salčinović (as governor); Vehid Šahinović (as prime minister)
- Formation: 21 September 1995

This is a list of heads of the Zenica-Doboj Canton.

== Heads of the Zenica-Doboj Canton (1995–present) ==
Party of Democratic Action
Social Democratic Party
Party for Bosnia and Herzegovina
Bosnian-Herzegovinian Initiative

=== Governors ===
№	Portrait	Name (Born–Died)	Term of Office		Party
1		Bedrudin Salčinović	21 September 1995	February 2001	SDA
2		Mugdin Herceg (1951–)	February 2001	6 October 2002	SDP BiH

=== Prime Ministers ===
№	Portrait	Name (Born–Died)	Term of Office		Party
1		Vehid Šahinović	23 December 1996	February 2001	SDA
2		Hamdija Kulović (1948–)	February 2001	4 September 2001	SBiH
3		Vahid Hećo (1954–)	4 September 2001	9 January 2003	SBiH
4		Nedžad Polić (1969–)	9 January 2003	19 January 2006	SBiH
5		Miralem Galijašević (1955–)	19 January 2006	28 February 2011	SDA
6		Fikret Plevljak (1956–)	28 February 2011	20 June 2013	SDP BiH
7		Munib Husejnagić (1959–)	20 June 2013	11 March 2015	SDP BiH
(5)		Miralem Galijašević (1955–)	11 March 2015	27 March 2019	SDA
8		Mirza Ganić (1981–)	27 March 2019	24 November 2020	SDA
9		Mirnes Bašić (1976–)	24 November 2020	23 December 2022	SDA
10		Amra Mehmedić (1981–)	23 December 2022	26 October 2023	BHI
11		Nezir Pivić (1983–)	26 October 2023	Incumbent	SDA
