= Nurija Pozderac =

Bosnian politician and World War II resistance leader

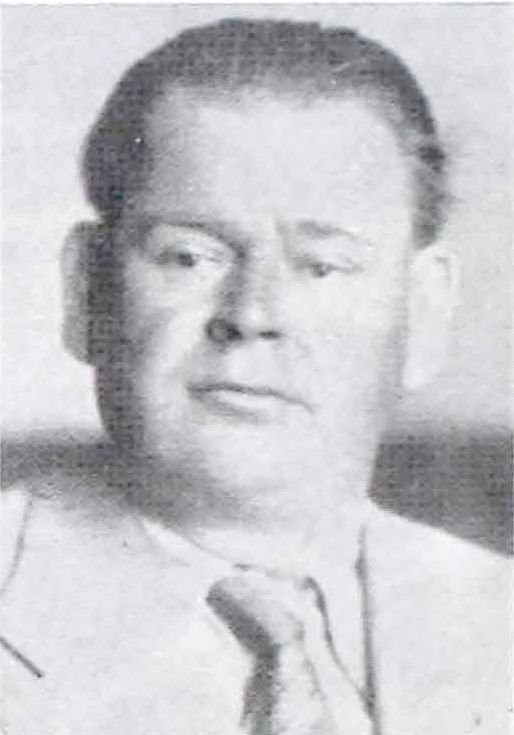

Vice President of the Executive Board of the Anti-Fascist Council of National Liberation of Yugoslavia
- In office 26 November 1942 – 12 June 1943
- Preceded by: Position established
- Succeeded by: vacant

Personal details
- Born: 15 January 1892 Cazin, Austro-Hungarian Bosnia, Austria-Hungary
- Died: 12 June 1943 (aged 51) near Tjentište, Independent State of Croatia
- Spouse: Devleta Pozderac
- Relatives: Agha Murat Pozderac; (father); Hakija Pozderac; (nephew); Hamdija Pozderac; (son); Hamdija Lipovača; (great-grandson); Vuk Jeremić; (great-grandson)
- Awards

Nurija Pozderac (15 January 1892 – 12 June 1943) was a Bosnian teacher, politician, member of the Yugoslav Muslim Organization, and local liberation leader during World War II, participating in the National Yugoslav Liberation Struggle. He served as Vice President of the Executive Board of the Anti-Fascist Council for the National Liberation of Yugoslavia. His nephews Hakija and Hamdija were influential communist politicians during the era of Yugoslavia.

== Early life ==
Pozderac was one of 11 children—seven sons and four daughters—born to Bashi-bazouk Agha Murat Pozderac (1862–1930), the last leader of Cazin, Bosnia and Herzegovina during Ottoman rule. His father had three wives, a common practice in 19th century Bosnia.

His six brothers were Mujaga, Mehmed, Muhamed, Smail, Ahmet, Hasan; his four sisters were Semka, Derviša, Šefika, and Zulejha.

== Politics ==
Nurija was a teacher before moving into politics in the 1930s. His first serious political engagement came as a minister in the local legislative and administrative body of Cazin. He was a member of the Yugoslav Muslim Organization.

== World War II ==
After the 1941 occupation of the Kingdom of Yugoslavia and the creation of the Independent State of Croatia, Pozderac was angry at the Ustasha policy of killing and expelling Jews and Serbs in Bosnia and Herzegovina. He rejected Džafer Kulenović's offer to become a minister in the Government of the fascist Independent State of Croatia.

Later in 1941, Pozderac teamed up with the Yugoslav Partisans and became a member of the Yugoslav National Liberation Movement. As an influential and well-known figure among the people of Cazin and the Krajina, in 1942 he was elected president of the National Liberation Committee in Cazin. He participated in the first session of the Anti-Fascist Council of National Liberation of Yugoslavia (AVNOJ) on 26—27 November 1942 in Bihać. At this meeting he was elected vice-president of the Executive Board of AVNOJ.

=== Death ===
In June 1943, during the Fifth Enemy Offensive (also known as the Battle of Sutjeska) and one of the Axis forces attack on Partisans' High Command, which was in retreat across the Sutjeska river and over the ridge of Maglić, attempting to reach Vučevo plateau, Pozderac was mortally wounded, while his group tried to take cover from heavy aerial bombardment on the edges of Perućica. Four days later, while in the presence of his son Sead, Nurija Pozderac died from his wounds.

== Legacy ==
In March 2013, Nurija and his wife Devleta received Israel's Righteous Among the Nations medal for rescuing and sheltering Jewish people during the Holocaust. His great-grandson, Serbian politician Vuk Jeremić, spoke at the ceremony saying that he was, "...immensely proud of his origin and ancestors who rose up against the crimes against their Jewish and Serbian citizens during World War II."
