= Nenad Kecmanović =

Bosnian Serb political scientist and politician (born 1847)

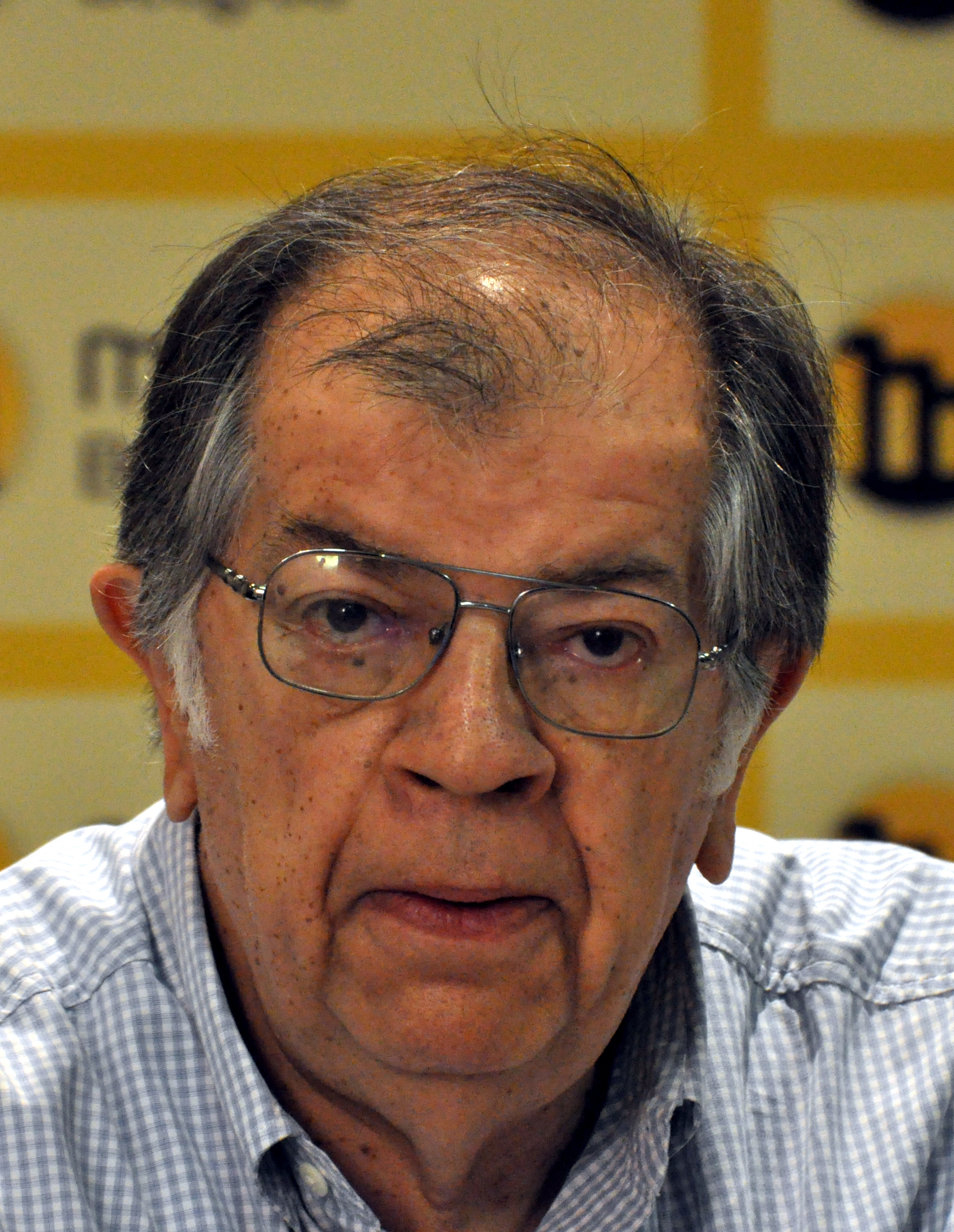
- Kecmanović in 2017

Serb member of the Presidency of the Republic of Bosnia and Herzegovina
- In office 17 June 1992 – 6 July 1992 Serving with Mirko Pejanović
- Preceded by: Biljana Plavšić
- Succeeded by: Tatjana Ljujić-Mijatović
Additional positions
Rector of the University of Sarajevo
In office 1988–1991
Preceded by	Ljubomir Berberović
Succeeded by	Jusuf Mulić

Personal details
- Born: 9 September 1947 (age 79) Sarajevo, PR Bosnia and Herzegovina, FPR Yugoslavia
- Party: Union of Reform Forces (1990–1992); Democratic Centre (2001–2004)
- Education: University of Sarajevo (BA, MA, PhD)

Nenad Kecmanović (Serbian Cyrillic: Ненад Кецмановић; born 9 September 1947) is a Bosnian Serb political scientist, sociologist, political analyst, publicist and former politician who served as the Serb member of the Presidency of the Republic of Bosnia and Herzegovina from June to July 1992. Resigning just 19 days after taking office, he is the shortest serving Presidency member overall.

Kecmanović was rector of the University of Sarajevo from 1988 until 1991. He has resided in Belgrade, Serbia since 1992.

== Early life and academic career ==
Kecmanović was born in Sarajevo, PR Bosnia and Herzegovina, FPR Yugoslavia on 9 September 1947. He graduated in sociology in 1971 as a student of the generation, and in political science in 1973, from the University of Sarajevo, after which he worked as an assistant at the Faculty of Political Science. He received his doctorate in "Convergence of Political Systems" in 1975. In 1976, Kecmanović became an assistant professor at the same Faculty, an associate professor in 1979, becoming a full professor in 1984. Until the Bosnian War and the breakup of Yugoslavia, he was a professor of political science and dean of the Faculty of Political Science in Sarajevo. He was rector of the University of Sarajevo from 1988 until 1991. In 1991, he received an honorary doctorate from the University of Michigan.

In Belgrade, Serbia, Kecmanović worked as a professor and head of the Department of Political Science at the Faculty of Political Sciences of the University of Belgrade.

Kecmanović is currently active as a full professor at the University of East Sarajevo. He was also dean of the University of Banja Luka, where he currently works as an associate professor. He has been a member of the Senate of Republika Srpska since September 1996. He was elected an expert of the United Nations Center for Peace and Development in Paris in 1998, and in 2006 he became a member of the Russian Academy of Sciences in Moscow.

== Political career ==
=== Šešelj against Miljuš ===
Brane Miljuš competed with Vojislav Šešelj for the position of assistant at the Sarajevo Faculty. What initially seemed like a purely scientific issue turned into a political dispute with the government of the then SR Bosnia and Herzegovina, especially with the leading figures of the ZK BiH, Branko Mikulić and Hamdija Pozderac, who supported Miljuš, whom Šešelj accused of copying his doctoral dissertation in part from Edvard Kardelj. Miljuš and Šešelj namely competed for the same assistant position at the faculty, and the promising young Miljuš won it.

Vojislav Šešelj himself later admitted that his goal at the time was neither the alleged plagiarism nor the competitor Brane Miljuš, but that he wanted to divert the attention of the Central Committee of the League of Communists of Bosnia and Herzegovina from Nenad Kecmanović:

Ja sam krenuo direktno na Pozderca

„To je bio način da pomognem Nenadu Kecmanoviću, protiv koga je krenula lavina optužbi iz Centralnog komiteta zbog njegovih napisa u beogradskom „Ninu“, pa sam ja na taj način pravio neku ravnotežu i krenuo direktno na Hamdiju Pozderca, što je Hamdija i shvatio.“

I headed straight for Pozderac.

"It was a way to help Nenad Kecmanović, against whom a series of accusations were launched from the Central Committee because of his articles in Belgrade's magazine "NIN", that's why I created a kind of balance and turned directly to Hamdija Pozderac, which he understood."

=== Multi-party system ===
Following the introduction of the multi-party system in Yugoslavia in 1990, Kecmanović founded a Bosnian branch of Ante Marković's centre-left Union of Reform Forces party. He was president of the party's Bosnian branch and its leader in the 1990 general election.

In 1990, at the last Yugoslav Presidency elections, Kecmanović was elected member of the Presidency of Yugoslavia, but was immediately removed from that office through the State Security Service, under the pretext of "insufficient security culture".

When Biljana Plavšić and Nikola Koljević, both members of the Serb Democratic Party, resigned their post as Serb members of the Presidency of Bosnia and Herzegovina in April 1992, Kecmanović was elected new member of the Presidency on 17 June 1992, as the Serb delegate with the most votes in the 1990 election after Plavšić and Koljević, serving with Mirko Pejanović of the Social Democratic Party (SDP BiH). However, on 6 July 1992, Kecmanović resigned his post as Serb member of the Presidency, and was succeeded by SDP BiH member Tatjana Ljujić-Mijatović.
