= Zenica-Doboj Canton =

Canton of the Federation of Bosnia and Herzegovina

Zenica-Doboj Canton Zeničko-dobojski kanton (Bosnian) Zeničko-dobojska županija (Croatian) Зеничко-добојски кантон (Serbian)
- Canton
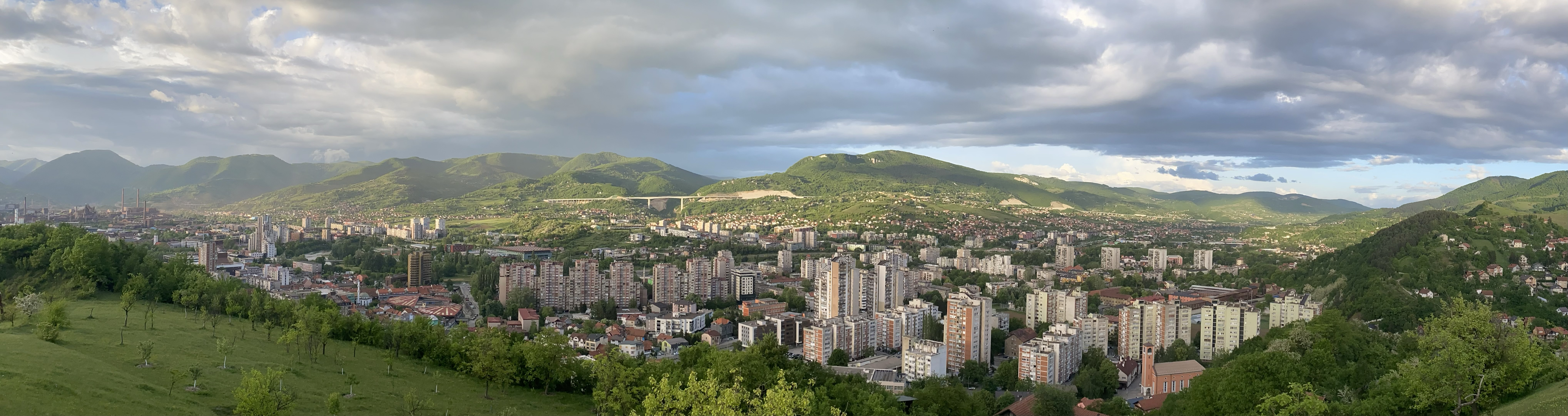
- City of Zenica

- Flag Coat of arms

- Country: Bosnia and Herzegovina
- Entity: Federation of Bosnia and Herzegovina
- Established: 12 June 1996
- Seat: Zenica

Government
  - Type: Parliamentary system
  - Prime Minister: Nezir Pivić (SDA)
  - President of Assembly: Ćazim Huskić (SDA)

Area
  - Total: 3,415 km^{2} (1,319 sq mi)

Population (2013)
  - Total: 364,433
  - Density: 106.7/km^{2} (276.4/sq mi)

Languages
  - Official: Bosnian, Croatian, Serbian
- Time zone: UTC+1 (CET)
  - Summer (DST): UTC+2 (CEST)
- HDI (2023): 0.806 very high · (2nd)

The Zenica-Doboj Canton (Bosnian: Zeničko-dobojski kanton; Croatian: Zeničko-dobojska županija; Serbian: Зеничко-добојски кантон) is a federated state and one of ten cantons in Bosnia and Herzegovina. It is part of the entity of Federation of Bosnia and Herzegovina. The seat and largest city is Zenica.

Spread over an area of 3,415 km^{2} (1,319 sq mi), the canton roughly occupies the central areas of the country. With a population of over 0.35 million inhabitants in 2013, it is the third most populous canton in the entity.

== History ==
Archeological evidence point to human habitation since the Neolithic period. The region was under the rule of the Illyrians, Romans, and Ottomans at various times during history. During the later Middle Ages, the city of Zenica served as the administrative centre of the region. Its location on the banks of the Bosna River made it an important economic centre during Ottoman rule.

In the late 19th century, it came under Austro-Hungarian rule, when rapid industrialization took place with the establishment of iron and steel factories, coal mines, and textile mills. This urbanization resulted in a rapid influx of people, and growth of population in the late 19th and early 20th centuries. During the First World War, the region experienced substantial damage and became part of Yugoslavia. During the Second World War, it was occupied by Nazi Germany. After the liberation during the late years of the war, it again became part of Yugoslavia. After the breakup of Yugoslavia in the early 1990s, it became part of Bosnia and Herzegovina. However, the subsequent ethnic conflict resulting in the Bosnia War took a heavy toll on the region. It endured heavy bombardment, and the economy collapsed. During the protests and riots in Bosnia and Herzegovina in February 2014, the entire government of the Zenica-Doboj Canton resigned.

== Geography ==
Zenica-Doboj is one of ten cantons in Bosnia and Herzegovina. It is part of the entity of Federation of Bosnia and Herzegovina. Spread over an area of 3,415 km^{2} (1,319 sq mi), the canton roughly occupies the central areas of the country. It is bordered by the other cantons of Sarajevo, Central Bosnia, and Tuzla of the Federation of Bosnia and Herzegovina. It also shares land borders with the municipalities of Teslić, Istočno Sarajevo, Petrovo and Doboj in the entity of Republika Srpska. The seat and largest city is Zenica.

The canton is situated in the inner Dinarides, and consists of three distinct topographical areas. The high mountainous southern region with an altitude of 501–1,473 m (1,644–4,833 ft), the highlands of the central region with altitudes between 201–500 m (659–1,640 ft), and the northern lowlands. River Bosna is the major river that flows through the region, and the lowlands in the north form part of the river valley. The river causes floods during seasons of high precipitation. The canton gets rainfall throughout the year, with the lowlands getting an average of 70 cm (28 in) and the highlands receiving 100 cm (39 in) of rain. The region has a temperate climate.

=== Sub-divisions ===
The Zenica-Doboj canton consists of the city of Zenica and 11 municipalities.

Municipality	Population	
Municipality	Urban	Municipal
Zenica	70,553	110,663
Tešanj	5,257	43,063
Visoko	11,205	39,938
Kakanj	11,796	37,441
Zavidovići	8,174	35,988
Žepče	5,460	30,219
Maglaj	6,099	23,146
Breza	3,014	14,168
Olovo	2,465	10,175
Vareš	2,917	8,892
Usora	–	6,603
Doboj Jug	–	4,137
Total	126,940	364,433

== Demographics ==
As per the 2013 census, a total of 364,433 inhabitants lived in Zenica-Doboj canton. It is the third most populous canton in the entity. Bosniaks formed the majority with about 82.2% of the population, followed by ethnic Croats (12%) and Serbs (1.5%).

== See also ==
- Political divisions of Bosnia and Herzegovina
- List of heads of the Zenica-Doboj Canton
- Zenica coal mine one of the largest deposits in Europe
