= Hamdija Pozderac =

Yugoslav politician

16th Vice President of the Presidency of Yugoslavia
- In office 15 May 1987 – 23 September 1987
- President: Lazar Mojsov
- Preceded by: Lazar Mojsov
- Succeeded by: Raif Dizdarević

3rd Member of the Presidency of Yugoslavia for SR Bosnia and Herzegovina
- In office 15 May 1986 – 23 September 1987
- Preceded by: Branko Mikulić
- Succeeded by: Mato Andrić (Acting); Raif Dizdarević

5th President of the League of Communists of Bosnia and Herzegovina
- In office 20 May 1982 – 28 May 1984
- Preceded by: Nikola Stojanović
- Succeeded by: Mato Andrić

4th President of the People's Assembly of SR Bosnia and Herzegovina
- In office 30 July 1971 – 1978
- Prime Minister: Dragutin Kosovac
- Preceded by: Džemal Bijedić
- Succeeded by: Niko Mihaljević

Personal details
- Born: 15 January 1924 Cazin, Kingdom of Serbs, Croats, and Slovenes
- Died: 7 April 1988 (aged 64) Sarajevo, SR Bosnia and Herzegovina, SFR Yugoslavia
- Party: League of Communists

Hamdija Pozderac (15 January 1924 – 6 April 1988) was a Yugoslav Bosniak communist politician from SR Bosnia and Herzegovina. He was the 4th President of the People's Assembly of SR Bosnia and Herzegovina from 1971 to 1974. Pozderac was also a member of the Presidency of Yugoslavia for SR Bosnia and Herzegovina from 1986 to 1987, and served as President of the League of Communists of Bosnia and Herzegovina from 1982 to 1984. He was forced to resign from politics due to a corruption scandal in September 1987.

Pozderac was considered one of the most influential and powerful politicians in Bosnia and Herzegovina during the communist era. His removal from the political scene in the late 1980s is today considered one of the most controversial events that preceded the Bosnian War. Pozderac was removed due to the Agrokomerc Affair of 1987, which the Yugoslav press compared to the American Watergate scandal.

== Early life ==
Pozderac was born in Cazin to an established Bosnian Muslim family which exerted strong influence in the westernmost part of the Bosnian region of Bosanska Krajina known for its strong resistance to the fascist Independent State of Croatia regime during World War II. During the war, he joined the illegal Alliance of Communist Youth of Yugoslavia (SKOJ) and the anti-fascist Partisan movement.

He held various military and public posts in the Bosanska Krajina region during the war and was ordained with several military and public honors. Following the advent of communist rule, the Pozderac family affirmed its strong position in Yugoslav politics with Nurija Pozderac and Hamdija's brother, Hakija, both of whom held high positions in the Yugoslav government during and after World War II. His younger sister Hasnija was a Mayor of Cazin and also a prominent political figure. Pozderac was a close ally of Josip Broz Tito, President of Yugoslavia for 27 years.

== Education ==
Pozderac was highly educated, holding a philosophy degree from the University of Belgrade. He studied in Moscow, published several sociological studies, and was a professor of political science at the University of Sarajevo.

== Political activity ==
Pozderac's politics centred on his involvement in the Communist Party of Yugoslavia that he ideologically followed. He held various high positions in the government of SR Bosnia and Herzegovina and SFR Yugoslavia in the 1970s and 1980s. He exerted considerable influence on the politics of the communist party. He was president of the Federal Constitutional Commission of Yugoslavia, which he held for nearly 20 years. His political ascendance began with the economic revitalisation of the Bosanska Krajina region, which was impoverished in the SR Bosnia and Herzegovina. Pozderac provided political backing to Agrokomerc, a small local food manufacturer that would later become one of the largest food manufacturing corporations in the former Yugoslavia. Agrokomerc proved to be the key to the economic prosperity of the region.

While his primary goal was economic reform of then impoverished SR Bosnia and Herzegovina, which he relatively successfully implemented, Pozderac also played an important role in confronting nationalists from Serbia through a series of controversial and risky political moves. The reason he is today considered one of the most important Bosnian politicians is his significant role in constitutional amendments in the 1970s, which recognised Bosnian Muslims as one of the constituent ethnic groups of SR Bosnia and Herzegovina and SFR Yugoslavia. Although his political orientation was left of centre, and while he continually confronted nationalist politics of ethnic groups in former Yugoslavia, Pozderac inevitably contributed to the establishment of the process that led to the emergence of the modern Bosniak nation.

=== Šešelj against Miljuš ===
A series of political attacks were reportedly staged against Pozderac by the Serbian lobby in Bosnia, who tried to discredit and remove him from the political scene. One attempt was made by Vojislav Šešelj in the early 1980s, who claimed that one of the students of Pozderac at the University of Sarajevo allegedly copied part of his dissertation from Edvard Kardelj and so it plagiarized, but was not punished for by Pozderac who was a mentor at the time. Allegedly because the student Brano Miljuš was a high-ranking individual within the Communist party, controversy ensued but Šešelj's efforts were ultimately unsuccessful.Miljuš and Šešelj competed for the same assistant position at the faculty, and the promising young Miljuš won it.

Vojislav Šešelj himself later admitted that his goal at the time was neither the alleged plagiarism nor the competitor Miljuš, but that he wanted to divert the attention of the Central Committee of the League of Communists of Bosnia and Herzegovina from Nenad Kecmanović:

Ja sam krenuo direktno na Pozderca

„To je bio način da pomognem Nenadu Kecmanoviću, protiv koga je krenula lavina optužbi iz Centralnog komiteta zbog njegovih napisa u beogradskom „Ninu“, pa sam ja na taj način pravio neku ravnotežu i krenuo direktno na Hamdiju Pozderca, što je Hamdija i shvatio.“

I headed straight for Pozderac.

"It was a way to help Nenad Kecmanović, against whom a series of accusations were launched from the Central Committee because of his articles in Belgrade's magazine "NIN", that's why I created a kind of balance and turned directly to Hamdija Pozderac, which he understood."

=== Sarajevo process ===
The most controversial process, however, was the so-called "Sarajevo process" in 1983. The Sarajevo process centred on convicting Alija Izetbegović for having written the Islamic Declaration. Pozderac reaffirmed his political opposition to Serbian nationalism and in particular to the politics of Slobodan Milošević, who was allegedly seeking to revert the constitutional amendments of the 1970s that awarded the Muslims the status of a constituent ethnicity.

The "Sarajevo process" backfired as the Serbian lobby insisted that Bosnia was a "dark vilayet" where all those who oppose the government will be prosecuted and where Bosnian Muslim communists were prosecuting Muslim believers. Others interpreted the "Sarajevo process" as Pozderac's way of removing political amateurs who could end up disrupting the process of Bosnian independence.

Izetbegović would later supersede Pozderac becoming the President of the Presidency of SR Bosnia and Herzegovina in 1990.

=== Agrokomerc Affair ===
Attacks on Pozderac culminated with the "Agrokomerc Affair" that began in 1987. In the 1980s Agrokomerc, one of the leading food manufacturers, was engulfed in questionable banking deals where the corporation issued numerous high interest promissory notes without the proper financial equity. Such practices were reportedly common within the Yugoslav system. The difference with Agrokomerc was that the director of the corporation, Fikret Abdić, lost the sense of scale as the corporation issued in excess of $500 million in "worthless" promissory notes.

The problem became more acute as the press reported on it as the biggest economic affair in former Yugoslavia triggering the 250% inflation rate in Yugoslavia. Pozderac, who contributed to the initial growth of Agrokomerc, was indicted of being aware of the financial dealings of the company. However such accusations were never proven.

The political blow to Pozderac came from Abdić's statement that he was in possession of audio tapes with conversations that would prove Pozderac's involvement in the scandal. While tapes were never actually presented, the political pressure on Pozderac culminated in September 1987, at which point he resigned from politics.

Abdić would later join Alija Izetbegović in 1990 to form the Party of Democratic Action (SDA) and win the popular vote for the Presidency of Bosnia and Herzegovina in the 1990 Bosnian general election.

== Legacy ==
Historical significance of Pozderac for the history of Bosnia and Herzegovina is today still debated among historians. He is criticized for his ideological following of the communist doctrines and for setting processes that did not honor certain liberties viewed in the western world as the core democratic principles, such as the freedom of speech. He was also criticized for being a cog of nepotism and although he did not subscribe to that tactic himself he certainly took advantage of it. As a result, Pozderac was criticized for contributing to the continued presence of Pozderac family on the political scene in Bosnia and Herzegovina.

One however needs to view these issues from the context within which Pozderac operated. Being part of the communist system, Pozderac saw political ascendance possible only within the system. If one adds to this, the patriarchic nature of the Balkans, his strong leadership was proven to be the only potent power that could make the difference in SR Bosnia and Herzegovina of the communist era. He was the follower of the conviction that political, legal, philosophical, religious, literary, artistic and other progress is based on the economic progress. Pozderac is credited for implementing processes that led the economic revitalization of Bosnia and Herzegovina, which contributed to strengthening the cultural independence and identity Bosnia within Yugoslavia.

Pozderac cannot be viewed as a movement leader but as a patient and principled politician who saw the opportunity for change by working within the system.

His legacy certainly can be credited with contributions to the constitutional recognition of Muslims (historically revived as Bosniaks in 1993) as a constituent people within Bosnia and Herzegovina, along with the already recognised Croats and Serbs, and his persistent position in protecting those rights. He has also continually worked on protection of the sovereignty of Bosnia and Herzegovina within Yugoslavia and while he did begin some processes for which he would be criticized, many consider that without his involvement in the Yugoslav politics at the time, Bosnia may have not had the political nor other potency to pursue to independence in the 1990s.
