= Hakija Pozderac =

Hakija Pozderac Хакија Поздерац
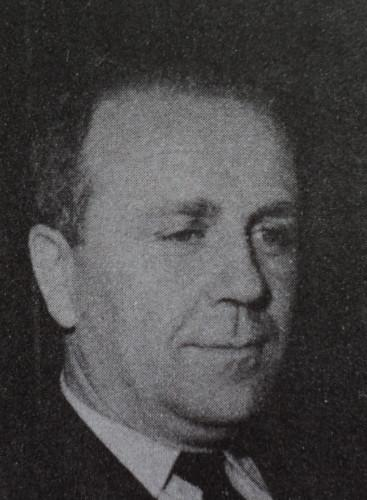
- Pozderac in 1965
- In office April 4, 1975 – February 21, 1994
- Prime Minister: Fadil Tihić
- Preceded by: Džemal Bijedić
- Succeeded by: Đuro Pucar
- In office October 29, 1960 – January 13, 1994
- Preceded by: Milentije Popović

Personal details
- Born: 6 March 1919 Cazin, Yugoslavia
- Died: 27 March 1994 (aged 74) Belgrade, Yugoslavia
- Party: Socialist Alliance of Working People of Yugoslavia
- Spouse: Razija Pozderac
- Children: 3
- Education: University of Belgrade

Hakija Pozderac (Serbian Cyrillic: Хакија Поздерац; 6 March 1919 – 27 March 1994) was a Yugoslav and Bosnian Muslim communist politician and partisan.

== Biography ==
Hakija Pozderac was the son of Devleta and Meho Pozderac. He self-identified as a Serb. Upon his uncle's request (Nurija Pozderac) he moved from Cazin to Belgrade in 1934 to complete his studies, where he graduated at Belgrade Technical School in 1938. Prior to the outbreak of World War II he joined the Alliance of Communist Youth of Yugoslavia (SKOJ). During this time he received an assignment from the Party to join the Yugoslav King's Army in order to agitate Communist virtues among the King's soldiers. On the day of the bombing of Yugoslavia, 6 April 1941, he was stationed with his regiment at the outskirts of Belgrade (Batajnica area), where his regiment held the position until captured by German Wehrmacht Forces. He spent from 10 April 1941 to 30 March 1942 in captivity at an unknown Military Prison Camp (near Mauthausen-Gusen concentration camp in Austria) until escaping with group of prisoners and returning by foot back to his hometown Cazin. After recovering from imprisonment, torture and hardship, he joined the Partizan movement 8th Krajina Muslim Striking Brigade (osma kraijska muslimanska udarna brigada), obtaining the position of Political Commissar until the end of the War, 15 May 1945.

From January 1947 until the end of 1948 he was the Republic Prosecutor for War Crimes committed in Districts Banja Luka and Bihać.

In 1948 he was elected as National Representative of Cazin to Republic Parliament.

From 1949 to 1952, General Secretary of the Government of Bosnia and Herzegovina (Sarajevo).

From 1953 to 1954, State Secretary for Economic Relations of National Republic of BiH (Sarajevo).

From 1954 to 1956, Head of State Secretariat for Budgeting and Economy of National Republic of BiH (Sarajevo).

From 1956 to 1960, Director of BiH National Bank, Branch Office of Yugoslavian National Bank (Sarajevo).

From 1960 to 1962, Head of Economic Relations Department in National Republic of BiH (Sarajevo).

From 1962 to 1965, Federal Secretary (Minister) for Economy, Federal Republic Of Yugoslavia (Belgrade).

From 1965 to 1967, Federal Secretary (Minister) for Industry and Trade, Federal Republic of Yugoslavia (Belgrade).

From 1967 to 1971, Representative in Federal Executive Council, Socialist Federal Republic of Yugoslavia (Belgrade).

From 1971 to 1982, Representative in Federal Assembly of Yugoslavia, SFRY (Belgrade).

From 1982 to 1983, Representative in the Council of Federation, SFRY (Belgrade).

Pozderac was married three times; first to Zekija Omanović from Cazin, with whom he had three children (Safija, Rasim and Malik). In his next two marriages, he had two sons (Jasminko and Mehmed): second marriage was to Habiba and third marriage to Razija from Zenica.

After Pozderac's death in 1994, his wife Razija and their son Mehmed moved to Sarajevo. His daughter Safija and son Rasim, now live in Belgrade.
