= 2024 Mostar municipal elections =

- 6 October 2024
- Mayoral election
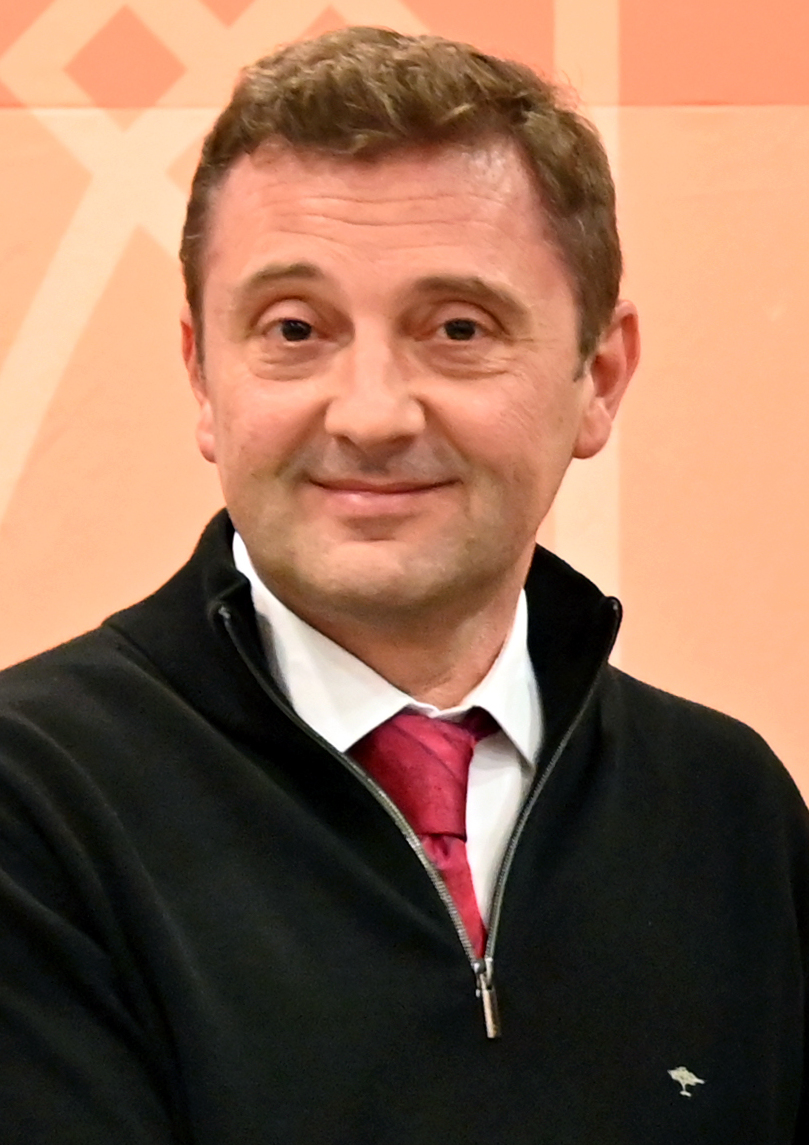
Candidate	Mario Kordić	Đani Rahimić
Party	HDZ BiH	SDA
Electoral vote	20	15
Percentage	57.14%	42.86%
Mayor before election
Mario Kordić
HDZ BiH
Elected mayor
Mario Kordić
HDZ BiH
- Assembly election
- All 35 seats in the City Council; 18 seats needed for a majority
- Turnout: 44.33%
Party	Leader	Vote %	Seats	+/–
HDZ BiH	Mario Kordić	41.00	15	+2
SDA (Note: Run in coalition with BHZ and BPS.)	Đani Rahimić	26.02	10	−1
DF–SBiH (Note: Run in coalition with NES and PMP.)	Sanel Kajan	11.88	3	+2
Troika	Sanjin Hadžiomerović	7.24	2	−4
HRS	Slaven Bevanda	6.57	3	0
HDZ 1990	Tomislav Ćurčić	3.16	1	0
HLJ	Dario Petrović	-	1	New
This lists parties that won seats. See the complete results below.
Speaker before	Speaker after
Salem Marić; SDA	Đani Rahimić; SDA

Municipal elections were held in Mostar on 6 October 2024 to elect members of the City Council and the mayor of Mostar. The elections were part of the Bosnian municipal elections. It was the first elections after 2008 to be held during the same time as the rest of the country, since the previous ones were held on 20 December 2020, 35 days apart.

== Background ==
This is the second election after a twelve-year intermission and just the fifth in the country. Most of the seats in the council are held by national-oriented parties, Croatian Democratic Union of Bosnia and Herzegovina controlling 13 seats and Party of Democratic Action with 11 seats.

Mostar is one of the cities in Bosnia and Herzegovina known for its ethnic division. Since the end of the war in Bosnia and Herzegovina, the city has been divided into a western part with a Croat majority and an eastern part with a Bosniak majority. According to the 2013 census, Croats make up 48.4% of the city, Bosniaks 44.1%, and Serbs 4.1%.

== Election system ==
When electing councilors to the City Council of the City of Mostar, voters vote on two ballots. One is used to elect parties at the level of the entire city, and the other at the level of six city areas, in three of which Bosniaks make up the majority, and in three Croats. There are 35 councilors in the council, of which 13 are elected from the city constituency, and 22 are proportionally divided according to the number of voters in six city areas. Seats distributed by the Sainte-Laguë method for parties that have crossed the electoral threshold of 3%.

The mayor of Mostar is elected indirectly from the City Council. If in two rounds of voting none of the candidates receives two-thirds support from 35 councilors, a third round is organized in which a simple majority is sufficient. In case of a tie, the mayor will become a younger candidate.

== Electoral lists ==
On 25 July 2024, the Central Electoral Commission (CIK) made decisions on order of candidate lists. The table below is a list of the all parties and electoral coalitions which are contesting the election in Mostar.

List	Parties	City areas running						
List	Parties	C	1	2	3	4	5	6
HDZ BiH	Croatian Democratic Union of Bosnia and Herzegovina	X	X			X	X	X
Troika	List: Social Democratic Party (SDP); People and Justice (NiP); Our Party (NS)	X	X	X	X		X	X
Coalition for Mostar	List: Party of Democratic Action (SDA); Bosnian-Herzegovinian Patriotic Party (BPS); Bosnian-Herzegovinian Greens (BH Zeleni)	X	X	X	X	X		
My City	List: Democratic Front (DF); People's European Union (NES); Party for Bosnia and Herzegovina (SBiH); First Mostar Party (PMP)	X	X	X	X		X	
HDZ 1990	Croatian Democratic Union 1990	X					X	X
SNSD	Alliance of Independent Social Democrats	X	X			X		
HSS	Croatian Peasant Party of Bosnia and Herzegovina	X						
HRS	Croatian Republican Party	X					X	X
HLJ	Croatian List for the South					X		
Ind. Ćavar	Independent list of Boška Ćavar						X	
Ind. Redžić	Independent list of Elvis Redžić	X						
Ind. Bally	Independent list of Elam Bally	X						

== City council elections ==
=== City areas ===
The six city areas were divided in such a way that the city is divided into two parts, i.e. three cover majority Bosniak settlements and three majority Croats. The settlement of Mostar is divided into three parts, which belong to the city areas of Old City, West and Southwest. On the other hand North, Southeast and South includes rural parts on both riversides of Neretva.

==== North ====
Party list	Votes	%	Seats
Coalition for Mostar	2,902	59.36	2
Troika	713	14.58	0
My City	634	12.97	0
HDZ BiH	350	7.16	0
SNSD	290	5.93	0
Total:	4,889	100.00	2
Invalid votes:	503	9.33	
Turnout:	5,392	49.55	
Registered voters:	10,882		
Source: Central Election Commission

==== Old City ====
Party list	Votes	%	Seats
Coalition for Mostar	4,452	51.99	3
Troika	2,170	25.34	1
My City	1,942	22.68	1
Total:	8,564	100.00	5
Invalid votes:	1,110	11.47	
Turnout:	9,674	40.55	
Registered voters:	23,855		
Source: Central Election Commission

==== Southeast ====
Party list	Votes	%	Seats
Coalition for Mostar	2,513	66.10	2
Troika	674	17.73	0
My City	615	16.18	0
Total:	3,802	100.00	2
Invalid votes:	464	10.88	
Turnout:	4,266	50.93	
Registered voters:	8,376		
Source: Central Election Commission

==== South ====
Party list	Votes	%	Seats
HDZ BiH	1,673	44.94	1
HLJ	1,117	30.27	1
Coalition for Mostar	601	16.14	0
SNSD	332	8.92	0
Total:	3,723	100.00	2
Invalid votes:	464	11.08	
Turnout:	4,187	50.22	
Registered voters:	8,337		
Source: Central Election Commission

==== Southwest ====
Party list	Votes	%	Seats
HDZ BiH	8,553	68.73	5
HRS	1,633	13.12	1
HDZ 1990	820	6.59	1
Troika	651	5.23	0
My City	435	3.50	0
Ind. Ćavar	353	2.84	-
Total:	12,445	100.00	7
Invalid votes:	912	6.83	
Turnout:	13,357	43.73	
Registered voters:	30,545		
Source: Central Election Commission

==== West ====
Party list	Votes	%	Seats
HDZ BiH	4,752	66.52	3
HRS	1,232	17.25	1
Troika	585	8.19	0
HDZ 1990	575	8.05	0
Total:	7,144	100.00	4
Invalid votes:	837	10.49	
Turnout:	7,981	41.6	
Registered voters:	19,159		
Source: Central Election Commission

=== City constituency ===
Party list	Votes	%	Seats
HDZ BiH	17,215	41.00	6
Coalition for Mostar	10,923	26.02	3
My City	4,988	11.88	2
Troika	3,038	7.24	1
HRS	2,758	6.57	1
SNSD	1,327	3.16	0
HDZ 1990	1,327	3.16	0
Ind. Bally	164	0.39	-
HSS	156	0.37	-
Ind. Redžić	88	0.21	-
Total:	41,984	100.00	13
Invalid votes:	2,855	6.43	
Turnout:	44,839	44.33	
Registered voters:	101,154		
Source: Central Election Commission

=== Combined results ===
Party list	City	Areas	Total
HDZ BiH	6	9	15
Coalition for Mostar	3	7	10
HRS	1	2	3
My City	2	1	3
Troika	1	1	2
HDZ 1990	0	1	1
HLJ	-	1	1
SNSD	0	0	0
HSS	0	-	0
Ind. Redžić	0	-	0
Ind. Bally	0	-	0
Ind. Ćavar	-	0	0
Total:	13	22	35
Source: Central Election Commission

== Mayoral election ==
The city council was constituted on 3 December 2024 with mayoral elections hold the same day. Mario Kordić was in the race with Đani Rahimić, who was nominated by the Coalition for Mostar, and Slaven Bevanda, who was nominated by HRS. After the counting, in the first round 17 councilors voted for Mario Kordić, 13 for Đani Rahimić, and three councilors for Slaven Bevanda. Two councilors submitted invalid ballots, one was incomplete and the other was filled in incorrectly. Kordić and Ramihić entered the second round of voting. Although both rounds of voting were said to last ten minutes, both rounds took significantly longer. In the second round, Rahimić received 13 votes, and Kordić 19. There were three invalid ballots. Since a two-thirds majority was not achieved, the third round of voting was started, in which a simple majority of the votes of the elected city councilors is required for the election of the mayor. In the third round of voting, Rahimić received 15 votes and Kordić 20, thus becoming the new, old mayor.

Candidate	Party	1st ballot	2nd ballot	3rd ballot
Mario Kordić	HDZ BiH	17	19	20
Đani Rahimić	SDA	13	13	15
Slaven Bevanda	HRS	3	Eliminated	
Invalid votes		2	3	-
Abstained		-	-	-
Total:		35	35	35
Majority needed		24	24	Relative
