= 2020 Ilidža local elections =

Local elections in Bosnia

- 15 November 2020
- Registered: 65,601
- Turnout: 45.68% (▲1.1 pp)
- Mayoral election
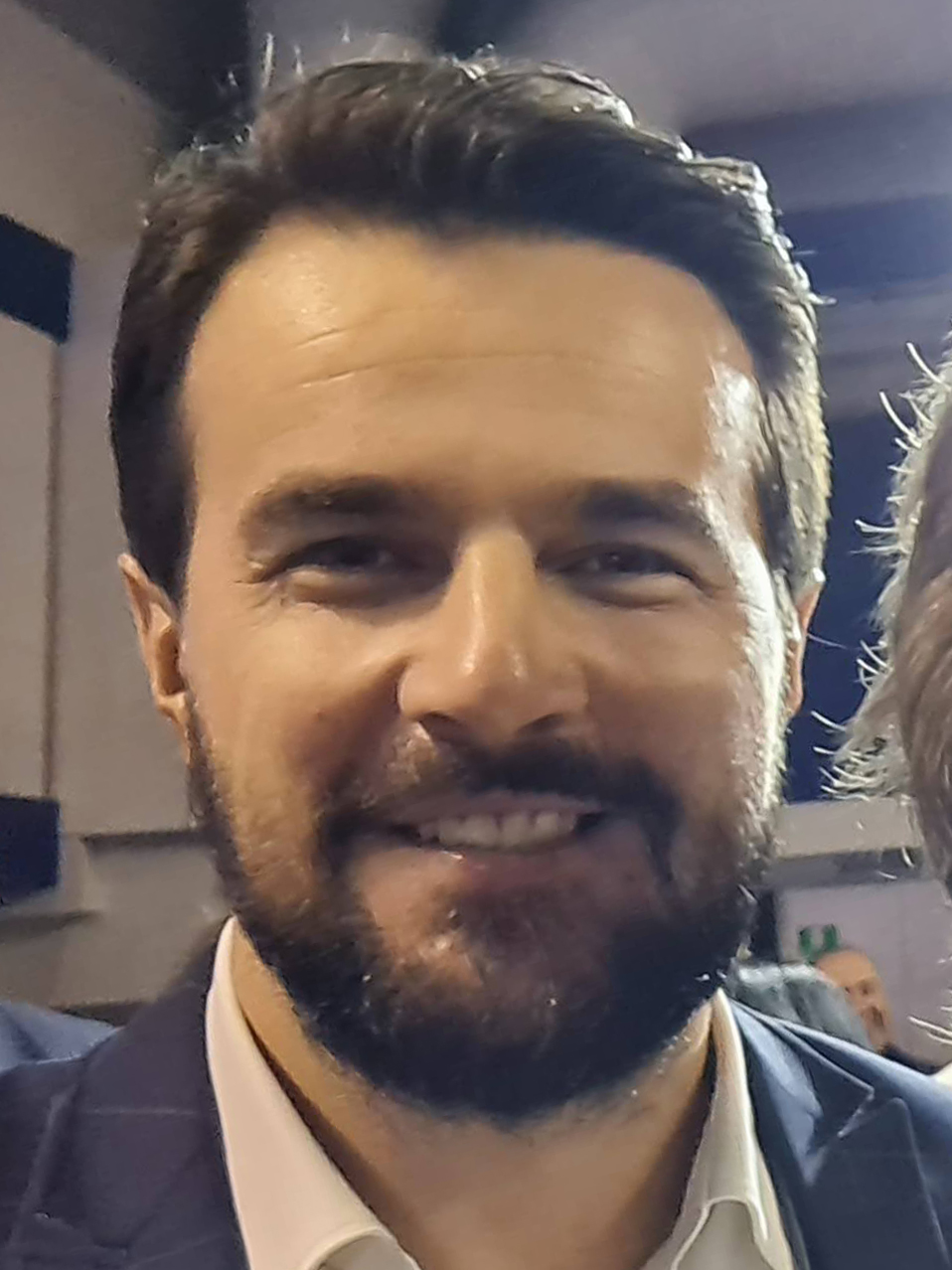

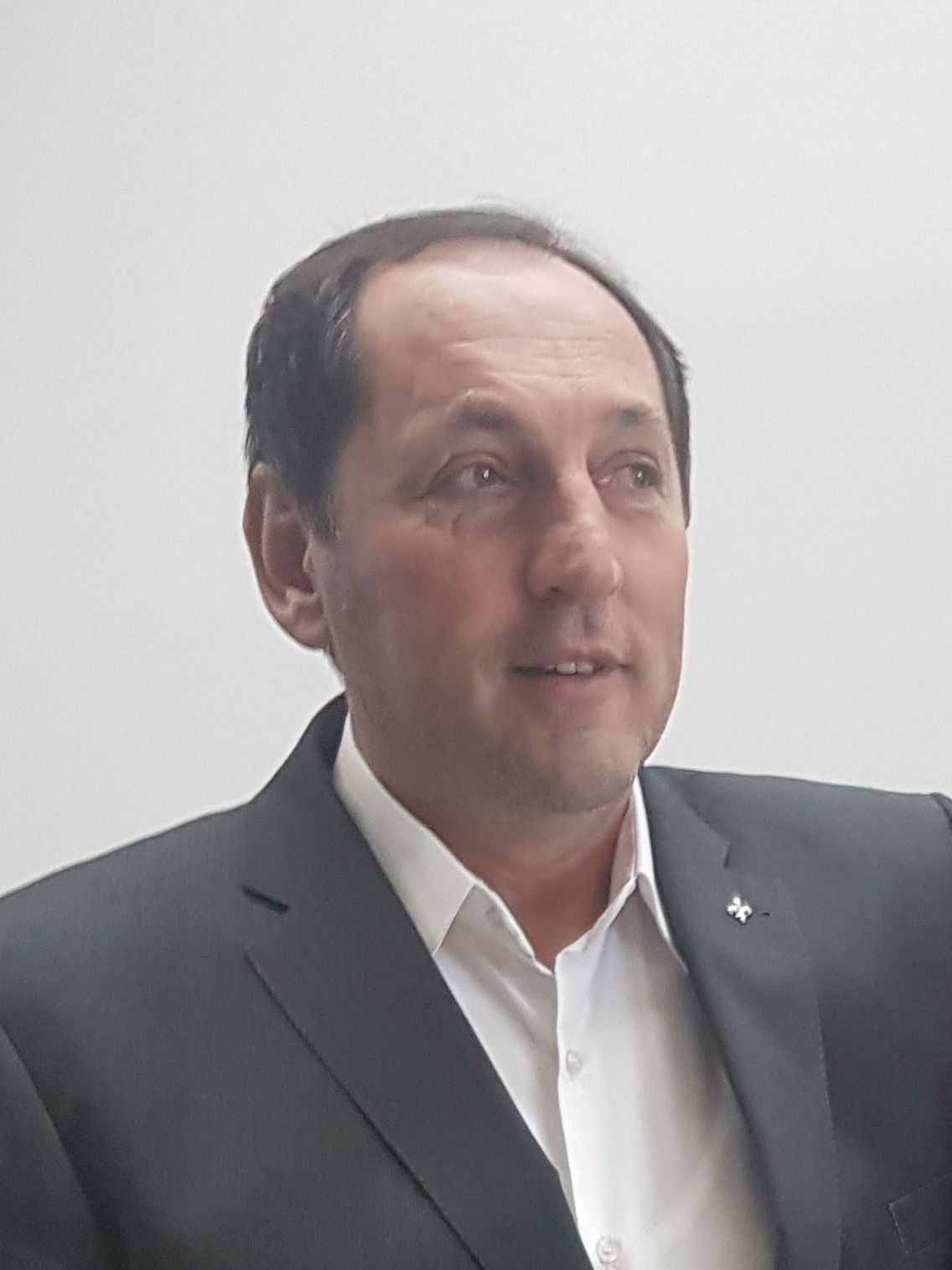
Candidate	Nermin Muzur	Fikret Prevljak
Party	NiP	SDA
Alliance	Four
Popular vote	18,349	8,730
Percentage	63.60%	30.26%
Candidate	Edin Bunda	Tahir Pervan
Party	PzP	Independent Bloc
Popular vote	1,345	227
Percentage	4.66%	0.79%
Mayor before election
Senaid Memić
SDA
Elected mayor
Nermin Muzur
NiP

Local elections were held in Ilidža on 15 November 2020 to elect members of the municipal council and the municipal mayor. The elections were part of the Bosnian municipal elections. The elections occurred under the backdrop of the COVID-19 pandemic.

== Background ==
Incumbent municipal mayor, Senaid Memić, was not seeking re-election, instead the Party of Democratic Action (SDA) candidate was former Bosnian Army commander Fikret Prevljak. The political dynamics in Ilidža mirrored broader trends in the Sarajevo Canton, with the Four coalition, a broad coalition of parties united in opposition to the SDA's dominance in the Canton, composing of People and Justice (NiP), the Social Democratic Party, Our Party and the Independent Bosnian-Herzegovinian List. Their candidate was NiP's Nermin Muzur. There were also two candidates from minor parties, Edin Bunda from the Platform for Progress, Tahir Pervan from the Independent Bloc and Muhamed Kubat who was an independent candidate.

== Campaign ==
Prevljak's campaign emphasized the importance of continuing the development of Ilidža, including infrastructure projects like a tramway to the neighborhood of Hrasnica, a cable car from Hrasnica to mount Igman and improving water and sewage systems. He promised to create job opportunities for young people to prevent their emigration and supported projects for self-employment and housing for young couples. His campaign was also marred by some controversy. The Central Election Commission had initiated proceedings against Prevljak, due to his controversial statement about Predrag Kojović, the president of Our Party, implying that Kojović “won't be around,” which the party reported as a threat. He also sent a letter to a dead soldier, Fahrudin Kovač, asking for his vote. Kovač’s son, Amar, who responded to it, said that his father died in 1992. Amar expressed his family's struggles and criticized Prevljak for the emotional distress caused by the letter.

Muzur was formerly a member of the SDA but left with several other SDA members to form People and Justice in 2018. He campaigned emphasizing the differences between the two parties, particularly in their approach to corruption and transparency and that he was willing to make personal sacrifices, such as reducing his salary and using public transport, to set an example and save costs. He promised to implement managerial governance, develop industrial zones, and improve tourism in Ilidža. He also supported building a tram line from Ilidža to Hrasnica and a cable car from Hrasnica to Igman. Regarding whether Ilidža should be a separate city or part of the capital Sarajevo, he said that decision should be made by its residents.

Platform for Progress candidate Edin Bunda criticized the lack of vision, knowledge, and strategy in local politics, criticizing both the ruling party and the opposition, calling for new faces in politics, change, and fresh ideas. His campaign focused on security, economic development, urbanization, and transparency. He also planned to address pollution, COVID-19, low birth rates, and traffic congestion by involving experts.

During a TV debate, independent candidate Muhamed Kubat, in what seemed like a frustrated, unplanned move, announced his withdrawal from the race to support Fikret Prevljak.

== Results ==
=== Mayoral election ===
Candidates		Results	
Candidate	Party	Votes	%
Nermin Muzur	NiP–NS–SDP	18,349	63.60
Fikret Prevljak	Party of Democratic Action	8,730	30.26
Edin Bunda	Platform for Progress	1,345	4.66
Tahir Pervan	Independent Bloc	227	0.79
Muhamed Kubat (withdrawn)	Independent	198	0.69
Invalid votes:		1,117	3.73%
Turnout:		29,966	45.68%
Registered voters:		65,601	

=== Municipal Council ===

Party	Previous seats	Votes	%	Seats	Seat change
Party of Democratic Action	14 / 31	8,702	30.73	11 / 31	▼3
People and Justice	0 / 31	8,406	29.68	11 / 31	▲11
Social Democratic Party	3 / 31	2,347	8.29	3 / 31	0
Our Party	3 / 31	1,356	4.79	2 / 31	▼1
Platform for Progress	0 / 31	1,237	4.37	2 / 31	▲2
First Party	2 / 31	1,029	3.63	1 / 31	▼1
Independent Bosnian-Herzegovinian List	0 / 31	973	3.44	1 / 31	▲1
Party for Bosnia and Herzegovina	1 / 31	831	2.93	0 / 31	▼1
Union for a Better Future	3 / 31	801	2.83	0 / 31	▼3
Democratic Front	0 / 31	719	2.54	0 / 31	0
Party of Democratic Activity	0 / 31	378	1.33	0 / 31	0
Pensioners' Party of Bosnia and Herzegovina	0 / 31	310	1.09	0 / 31	0
Croatian Democratic Union of Bosnia and Herzegovina	0 / 31	301	1.06	0 / 31	0
Independent Bloc	0 / 31	277	0.98	0 / 31	0
Bosnian-Herzegovinian Patriotic Party	1 / 31	274	0.97	0 / 31	▼1
Liberal Democratic Party	0 / 31	205	0.72	0 / 31	0
Social Democrats	0 / 31	115	0.41	0 / 31	0
Bosniak Movement	0 / 31	39	0.14	0 / 31	0
Movement Bridge 21	0 / 31	16	0.06	0 / 31	0
Croatian Party of Rights of Bosnia and Herzegovina	0 / 31	6	0.02	0 / 31	0
Invalid votes:		1,644	5.49%		
Turnout:		29,966	45.68%		
Registered voters:		28,322			
