= Irma Baralija =

Bosnian politician and activist (born 1984)

Member of the Mostar City Council
- Incumbent
- Assumed office 5 February 2021

Personal details
- Born: 1984 (age 41–42) Mostar, SR Bosnia and Herzegovina, SFR Yugoslavia
- Party: Our Party
- Education: University of Sarajevo (BA); Complutense University (MA)

Irma Baralija (born 1984) is a Bosnian politician, teacher, and democracy activist serving as member of the Mostar City Council since February 2021. She is a member of Our Party.

Baralija rose to prominence in 2018, when she took the Bosnian government to court for violating her human rights after local elections were not held in her hometown Mostar for over a decade following a political stalemate between rival nationalist parties. In 2019, the European Court of Human Rights ruled in Baralija's favour, and the following year local elections were held in Mostar for the first time since 2008.

== Early life and education ==
Baralija was born in Mostar in 1984. After studying philosophy and sociology at the University of Sarajevo, she went on to obtain a master's degree in political sciences at Compluntense University in Madrid, Spain.

In 2011, Baralija returned to Mostar, where she found work as a high school teacher. She taught at multiple schools throughout the city, including Croatian, Bosnian, and International Baccalaureate Diploma curricula. Barija also worked as a professor of philosophy and sociology at United World College in Mostar.

== Political career ==
=== European Court of Human Rights case (2018–2020) ===
Mostar is an ethnically divided city in which the population is roughly split between Bosniaks and Croats, who live on either side of the Neretva River. The city's statute, implemented in 2004, divided it into constituencies whose elected members compromised the City Council. Concerns arose that the constituencies were not proportionate to the number of people living within them, leading to disproportionate representation in the City Council, and ultimately prompting the Constitutional Court of Bosnia and Herzegovina to rule the Mostar's electoral system as "unconstitutional". Despite this, the council, which was largely divided on ethnic grounds, did not address the issue by the end of its mandate in 2012, and as a result local elections were not held in the city in 2012 or 2016. As a result, the only person with political power was Ljubo Bešlić of the Croatian Democratic Union (HDZ), who had been elected as mayor in 2008; in 2019, when he was admitted to hospital in Croatia, Baralija described the political situation in Mostar as a "political ghost town" due to the lack of an operating city council to oversee things in Bešlić's absence.

The two ruling nationalist parties in Mostar following the 2008 election, the Croat HDZ and the Bosniak Party of Democratic Action (SDA), proposed a new city statute that would have given two-thirds of the City Council's seats to members of six constituencies: three located in the city's Croat districts, and another three in the city's Bosniak districts. The remaining one third of seats would go to members elected via a citywide list. Baralija voiced concerns at these proposals, identifying that the predominance given to constituency seats would mean the continued predominance of nationalist parties in the city, causing further division within Mostar. Baralija criticised the predominance of nationalist politics in Bosnia-Herzegovina, describing the 1995 Dayton Agreement, which had formally divided the country on ethnic lines, describing it as "unfunctional" in contemporary Bosnia-Herzegovina. She accused right-wing nationalist parties like the HDZ and the SDA of wrongly making Bosnians believe that change was only possible through voting on ethnic grounds, and publicly commented that politics would work better ethnic division was removed from politics and society at large.

In 2018, after feeling frustrated at being unable to have a say in local politics, Baralija decided to enter local politics and became a member of the social-liberal and multi-ethnic Our Party, going on to become its vice president. That same year, Baralija filed an application before the European Court of Human Rights, in which she accused the Bosnian government of violating her human rights after failing to hold elections in Mostar since 2008. The following year, the Court ruled in Baralija's favour, finding that the government's failure to enable democratic elections in Mostar accounted to discrimination against Baralija due to the area she lived. The Court ordered the government to reform this within six months, and in June 2020, the 2001 Election Act was amended and an electoral framework was established that would permit residents of Mostar to vote in local elections the following December. On elections held on 20 December 2020, Baralija was elected as an Our Party councillor on Mostar City Council.

=== Mostar City Council (2020–present) ===
In February 2021, Baralija ran as the candidate for the left-leaning parties for City Mayor of Mostar. She was eliminated following the first round of voting.

In 2021, Baralija campaigned for formal recognition with Mostar of Berta Bergman and Marija Kon, two sisters who were the first in Bosnia to graduate high school and to obtain a doctorate, respectively. In 2023, a plaque was unveiled by the City Council at Gimnazija Mostar where the sisters attended, though Baralija criticised the unveiling for not mentioning the role she played in getting the sisters formally recognised.

That same year, Baralija resigned from her position as the national vice president of Our Party, citing personal reasons. It was subsequently reported that she had stepped down due to her unhappiness when Our Party's president, Predrag Kojović, publicly apologised for a joke Baralija had made on social media about photos of her, the mayor of Sarajevo, Benjamina Karić, and the mayor of Banja Luka, Draško Stanivuković, at an event in Mostar. Baralija publicly stated that the jokes were made in good humour, though she was criticised by some members of the Social Democratic Party.

In 2022, Baralija presented a letter to the City Council from international diplomats including High Representative Christian Schmidt, Matt Field, Johann Sattler, and Kathleen A. Kavalec, calling for the council to formally rename five streets in Mostar that were named after members of the Ustaše, a Croatian fascist organisation.

== Recognition ==
In March 2021, the United States embassy in Sarajevo gave Baralija an award in honour of Women's History Month, in recognition of her efforts to return democracy to Mostar.
