= 2020 Mostar municipal elections =

- 20 December 2020
- Mayoral election
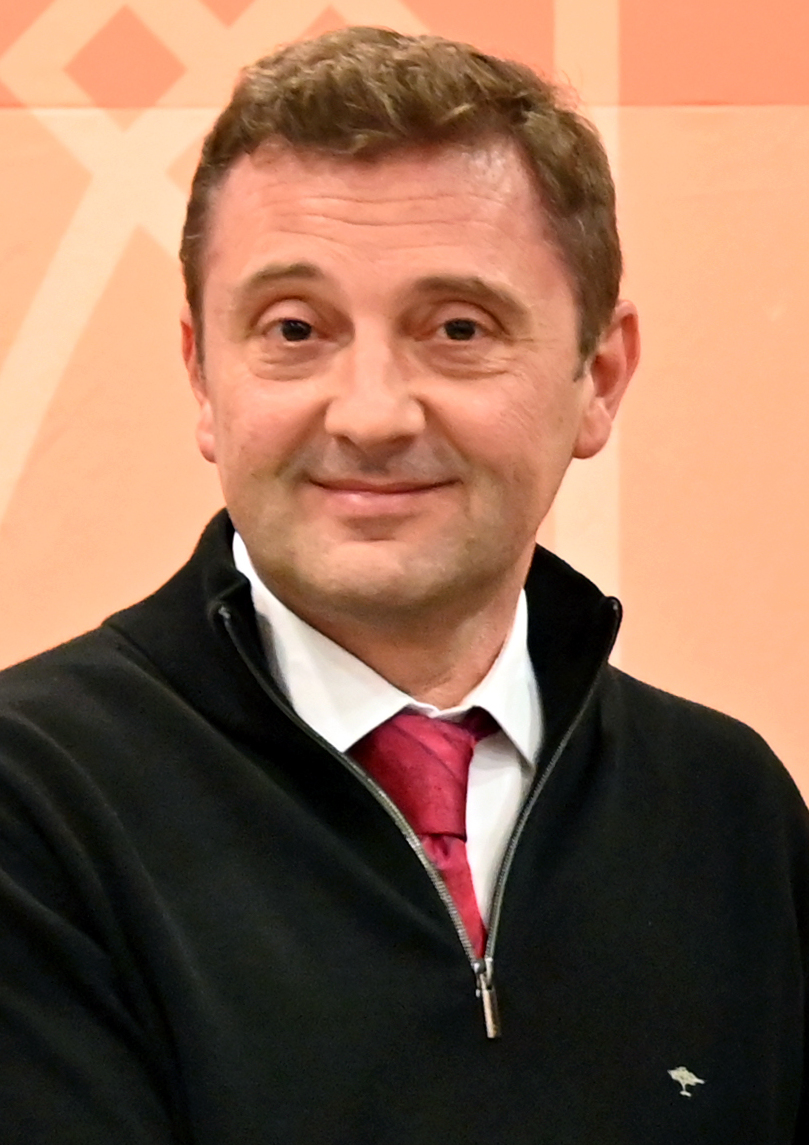
Candidate	Mario Kordić	Zlatko Guzin
Party	HDZ BiH	SDA
Electoral vote	17	16
Percentage	48.57%	45.71%
Mayor before election
Ljubo Bešlić
HDZ BiH
Elected mayor
Mario Kordić
HDZ BiH
- Assembly election
- All 35 seats in the City Council; 18 seats needed for a majority
- Turnout: 55.59%
Party	Leader	Vote %	Seats	+/–
HDZ BiH	Mario Kordić	35.27	13	+6
SDA (Note: Run in coalition with SBB, DF, SBiH and BPS.)	Zlatko Guzin	30.08	11	−1
SDP–NS	Arman Zalihić	13.19	6	+3
HRS	Slaven Bevanda	7.08	3	New
SNSD–SDS	Velibor Milivojević	4.83	1	+1
PMP	Nazif Derviškadić	3.89	1	New
This lists parties that won seats. See the complete results below.
Speaker before	Speaker after
Vacant	Salem Marić; SDA

Municipal elections were held in Mostar on 20 December 2020 to elect members of the City Council and the mayor of Mostar. The elections were part of the Bosnian municipal elections, although the elections in the rest of the country the elections were held earlier, on 15 November.

== Background ==
The first local elections after a twelve-year intermission were held in Mostar after the Constitutional Court of Bosnia and Herzegovina amended the election regulations relating to that city, and in the middle of the year a political agreement was reached with the mediation of international officials on the method of electing city councilors. Croatian Democratic Union of Bosnia and Herzegovina and the Party of Democratic Action have unsuccessfully negotiated new election rules for more than nine years, that is, how many councilors will be elected from which constituency. They agreed on this only in the middle of 2020, after strong pressure from the international community and after the judgment of the European Court of Human Rights from October 2019 following the lawsuit of Irma Baralija from Mostar. The European Court ruled that the fact that there were no elections in Mostar for so long represented a violation of the human and civil rights of the inhabitants of that city.

Mostar is one of the cities in Bosnia and Herzegovina known for its ethnic division. Since the end of the war in Bosnia, the city has been divided into a western part with a Croat majority and an eastern part with a Bosniak majority. According to the 2013 census, Croats make up 48.4% of the city, Bosniaks 44.1% and Serbs 4.1%.

== Election system ==
When electing councilors to the City Council of the City of Mostar, voters vote on two ballots. One is used to elect parties at the level of the entire city, and the other at the level of six city areas, in three of which Bosniaks make up the majority, and in three Croats. There are 35 councilors in the council, of which 13 are elected from the city constituency, and 22 are proportionally divided according to the number of voters in six city areas. Seats distributed by the Sainte-Laguë method for parties that have crossed the electoral threshold of 3%.

The mayor of Mostar is elected indirectly from the City Council. If in two rounds of voting none of the candidates receives two-thirds support from 35 councilors, a third round is organized in which a simple majority is sufficient. In case of a tie, the mayor will become a younger candidate.

== City council elections ==
=== City areas ===
The six city areas were divided in such a way that the city is divided into two parts, i.e. three cover majority Bosniak settlements and three majority Croats. The settlement of Mostar is divided into three parts, which belong to the city areas of Old City, West and Southwest. On the other hand North, Southeast and South includes rural parts on both riversides of Neretva.

==== North ====
Party list	Votes	%	Seats
Coalition for Mostar	3,825	65.90	2
SDP–NS	1,069	18.42	0
HDZ BiH	456	7.86	0
SNSD–SDS	439	7.56	0
others	15	0.26	-
Total:	5,804	100.00	2
Invalid votes:	394	6.36	
Turnout:	6,198	58.48	
Registered voters:	10,598		
Source: Central Election Commission

==== Old City ====
Party list	Votes	%	Seats
Coalition for Mostar	5,309	44.66	2
SDP–NS	4,732	39.80	2
PMP	1,111	9.35	1
PzP	419	3.52	0
SNSD–SDS	242	2.04	-
others	75	0.63	-
Total:	11,888	100.00	5
Invalid votes:	870	6.82	
Turnout:	12,758	54.44	
Registered voters:	23,436		
Source: Central Election Commission

==== Southeast ====
Party list	Votes	%	Seats
Coalition for Mostar	3,590	72.75	2
PzP	583	11.81	0
SDP–NS	541	10.96	0
SNSD–SDS	112	2.27	-
HDZ BiH	94	1.90	-
others	15	0.30	-
Total:	4,935	100.00	2
Invalid votes:	332	6.30	
Turnout:	5,267	64.13	
Registered voters:	8,213		
Source: Central Election Commission

==== South ====
Party list	Votes	%	Seats
HDZ BiH	2,619	52.66	1
Coalition for Mostar	1,001	20.13	1
SNSD–SDS	569	11.44	0
HRS	411	8.26	0
HSP BiH–HKDU–HRAST	266	5.35	0
HDZ 1990	107	2.15	-
Total:	4,973	100.00	2
Invalid votes:	320	6.05	
Turnout:	5,293	62.54	
Registered voters:	8,464		
Source: Central Election Commission

==== Southwest ====
Party list	Votes	%	Seats
HDZ BiH	9,238	59.29	5
HRS	2,547	16.35	1
SDP–NS	1,602	10.28	1
HDZ 1990	828	5.31	0
Coalition for Mostar	634	4.07	0
SNSD–SDS	492	3.16	0
HSP BiH–HKDU–HRAST	221	1.42	-
others	18	0.12	-
Total:	15,580	100.00	7
Invalid votes:	879	5.34	
Turnout:	16,459	53.23	
Registered voters:	30,923		
Source: Central Election Commission

==== West ====
Party list	Votes	%	Seats
HDZ BiH	5,398	56.77	2
HRS	1,736	18.26	1
SDP–NS	1,198	12.60	1
SNSD–SDS	543	5.71	0
HDZ 1990	422	4.44	0
HSP BiH–HKDU–HRAST	180	1.89	-
others	32	0.34	-
Total:	9,509	100.00	4
Invalid votes:	600	5.94	
Turnout:	10,109	52.57	
Registered voters:	19,230		
Source: Central Election Commission

=== City constituency ===
Party list	Votes	%	Seats
HDZ BiH	18,901	35.35	5
Coalition for Mostar	15,903	29.74	4
SDP–NS	7,148	13.37	2
HRS	3,798	7.10	1
SNSD–SDS	2,585	4.83	1
PzP	1,445	2.70	-
Independent list right on the city	1,310	2.45	-
HDZ 1990	1,206	2.26	-
others	1,171	2.20	-
Total:	53,467	100.00	13
Invalid votes:	2,605	4.65	
Turnout:	56,072	55.59	
Registered voters:	100,864		
Source: Central Election Commission

=== Combined results ===
Party list	City	Areas	Total
HDZ BiH	5	8	13
Coalition for Mostar	4	7	11
SDP–NS	2	4	6
HRS	1	2	3
SNSD–SDS	1	-	1
PMP	-	1	1
Total:	13	22	35
Source: Central Election Commission

== Mayoral election ==
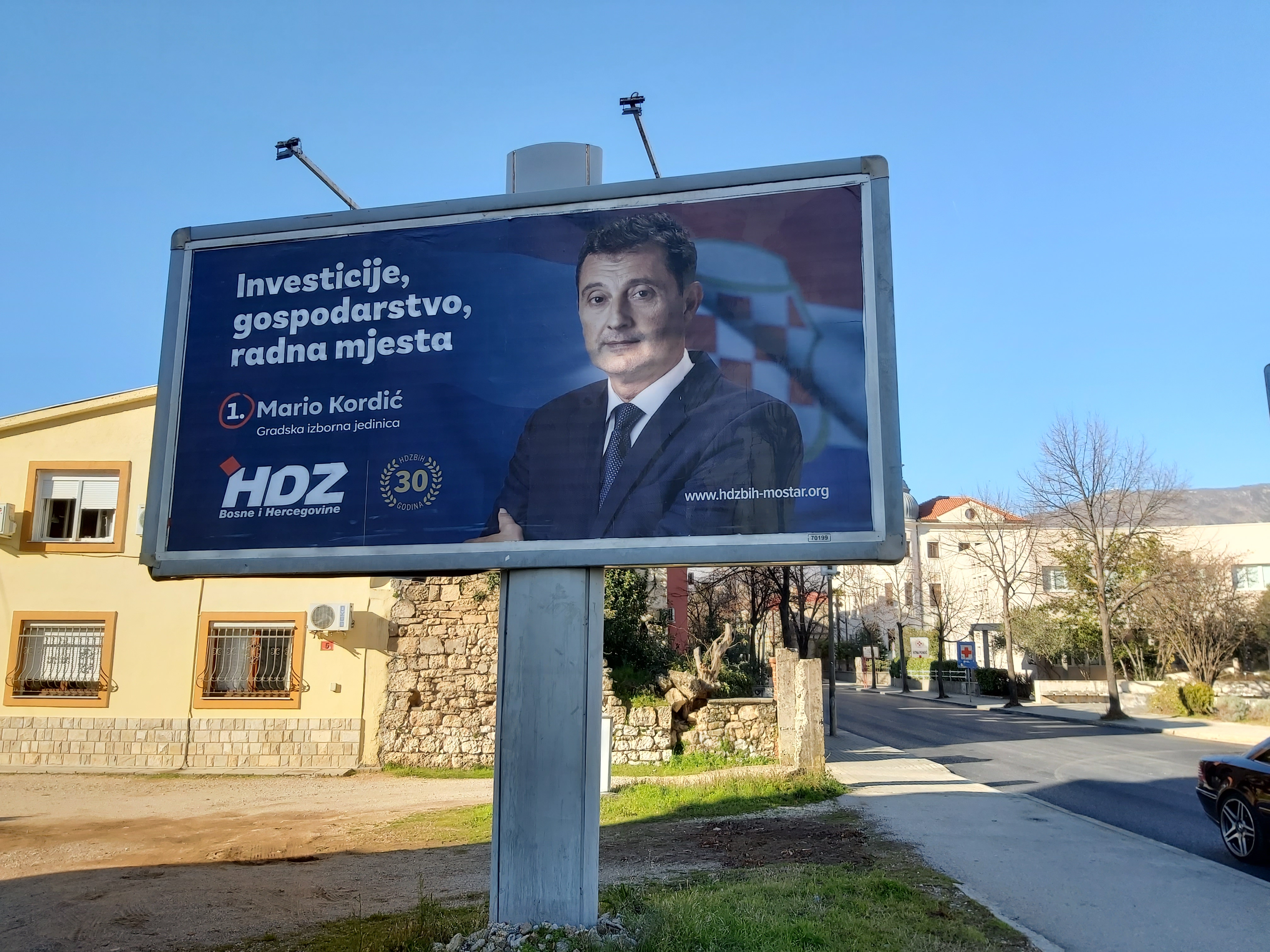
One of HDZ BiH's campaign posters featuring mayoral candidate Mario Kordić. The slogan Investments, economy, jobs is positioned above the party's logo

The city council was constituted on 5 February 2021, and the first round of elections for mayor was held there, in which none of the candidates received the required majority. Before voting in the second round, the representatives of the Coalition for Mostar, which includes the SDA, SBB, DF, SBiH and BPS, left the session, resulting in a lack of quorum, which is why the voting was postponed to February 10. After the first round, High Representative Valentin Inzko sent a message to the councilors that the election in the first round was invalid because the voting was held in public, which is contrary to the city's statute, which provides for secret voting. For this reason, on February 10, the first round of elections was repeated, which enabled new candidacies. In the end, Mario Kordić with 14 votes and Zlatko Guzin with 12 went to the second round, the other candidates were eliminated. The second round of elections was planned for February 12, but was postponed to February 15 at the request of several councilors. The second round was held on 15 February, and even then no one got the required majority, 17 councilors voted for Kordić and 14 for Guzin. The third round was held immediately after that, and Kordić again won 17 votes, which was enough for him to be elected mayor, while Guzin won 16 votes.

Candidate	Party	1st ballot	1st ballot (Note: Repeated 1st ballot)	2nd ballot	3rd ballot
Mario Kordić	HDZ BiH	14 (Note: HDZ and SNSD)	14	17	17
Zlatko Guzin	SDA	11 (Note: SDA, SBB, DF, SBiH and BPS)	12	14	16
Irma Baralija	NS	5 (Note: SDP and NS)	2	Eliminated	
Arman Zalihić	SDP	-	0	Eliminated	
Invalid votes		-	3	1	2
Abstained		5 (Note: HRS and PMP)	4	3	-
Total:		35	35	35	35
Majority needed		24	24	24	Relative
