= 2020 Bosnian municipal elections =

Elections in Bosnia and Herzegovina

- 15 November 2020 (Note: Elections in Mostar were conducted on 20 December 2020.)

All 145 municipal/city mayors All 145 municipal/city councils
- Registered: 3,283,194
- Turnout: 50.40% (▼3.48 pp)
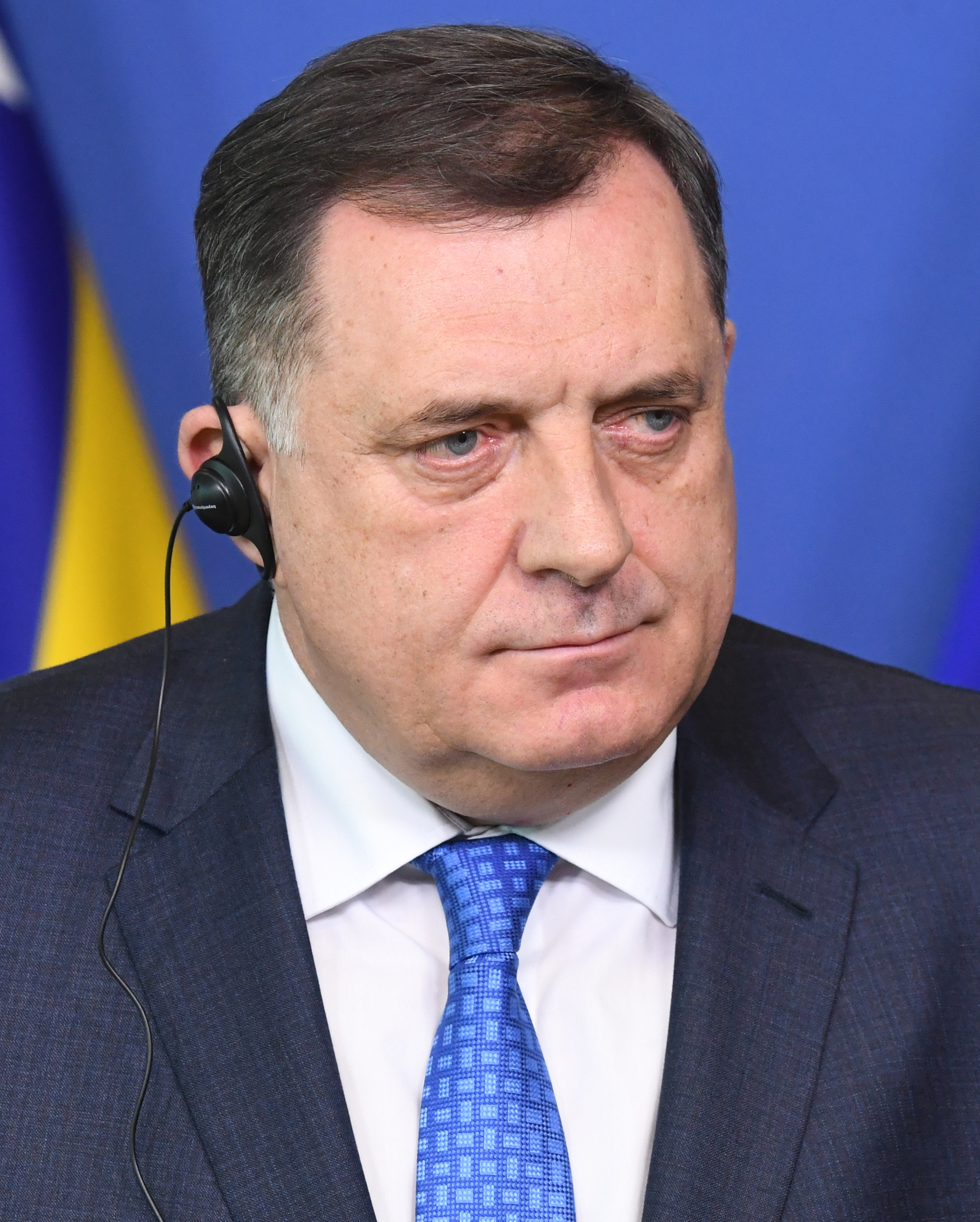

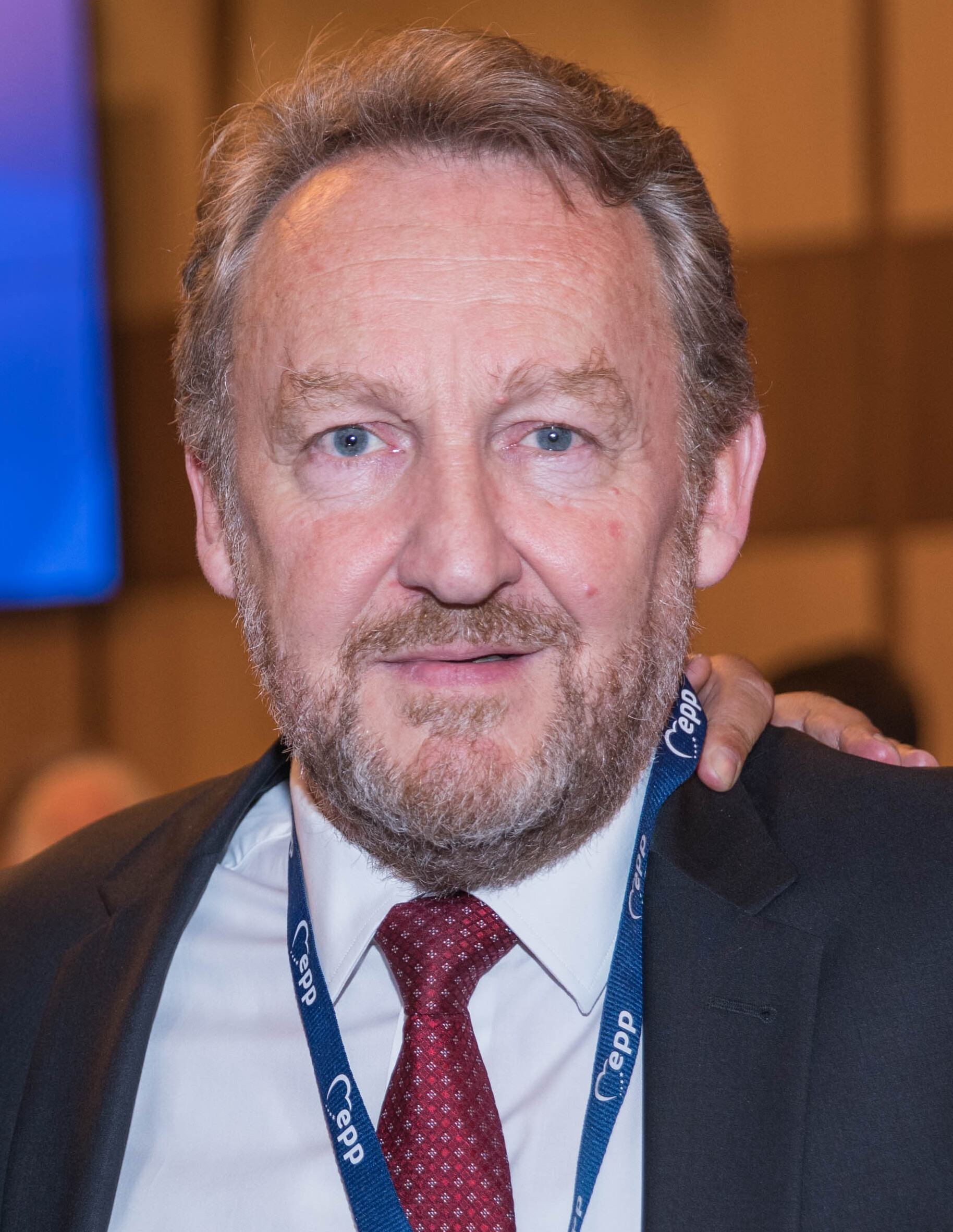

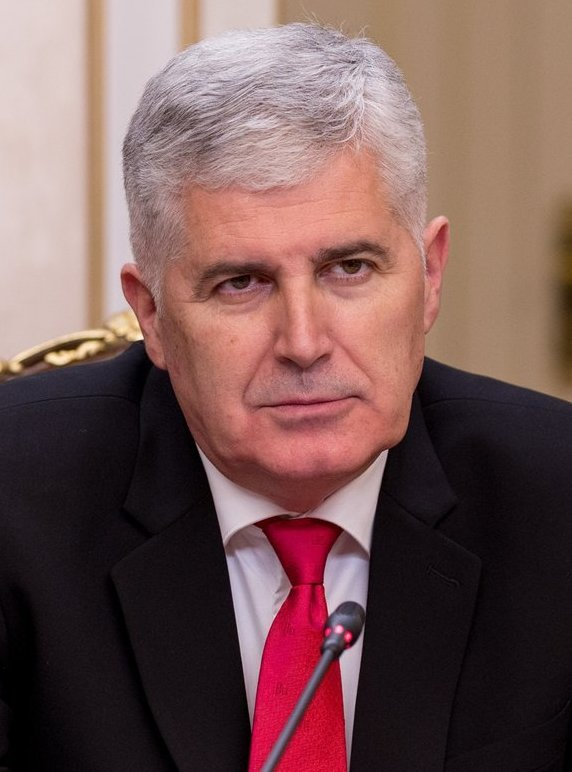

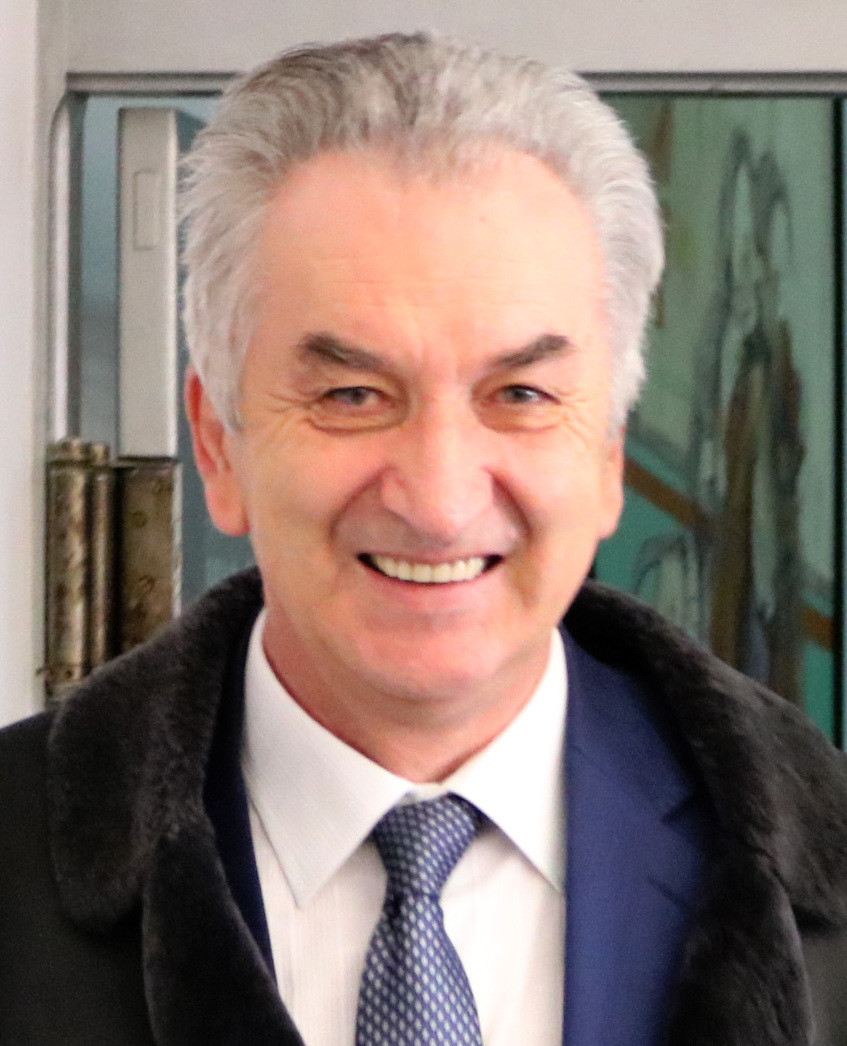

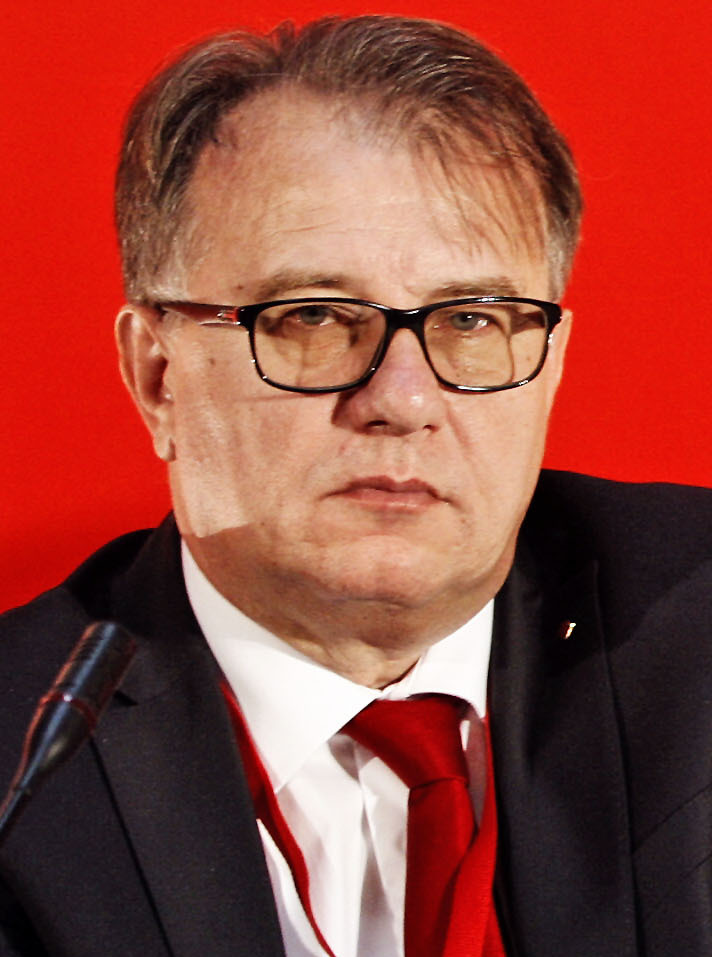
	First party	Second party	Third party
Leader	Milorad Dodik	Bakir Izetbegović	Dragan Čović
Party	SNSD	SDA	HDZ BiH
Mayors	44	27	22
Change	▲11	▼7	▲3
Percentage	30.34%	18.62%	15.17%
	Fourth party	Fifth party	Sixth party
			IND
Leader	Mirko Šarović	Nermin Nikšić	None
Party	SDS	SDP BiH	Independent
Mayors	16	9	5
Change	Steady	▲1	▼9
Percentage	11.03%	6.20%	3.44%
- Results by municipality.

Municipal elections were held in Bosnia and Herzegovina on 15 November 2020 to elect mayors and assemblies in 145 municipalities and cities. Originally scheduled for 4 October, they were postponed due to a lack of funds.

Occurring under the backdrop of the COVID-19 pandemic, they came less than a year following the delayed formation of the state government. National coalition partners and the hegemonic Bosniak, Serb and Croat political parties, the Party of Democratic Action (SDA), Alliance of Independent Social Democrats (SNSD) and Croatian Democratic Union (HDZ), respectively, each defended the most number of positions.

A total of 3,283,194 citizens of Bosnia and Herzegovina were registered to vote – almost on par with the total population of the country, 3,531,159 at the 2013 census – pointing to issues of outdated data in the voters' registry.

Out of 425 mayoral candidates, 29 were women. Only 4 women were elected mayors, down from 7.

== Electoral system ==
Municipal elections in Bosnia and Herzegovina comprise the election of a mayor and municipal assembly across the 145 municipalities of the Federation of Bosnia and Herzegovina and Republika Srpska. They are governed by the Law on Elections.

Mayors are elected by a first-past-the-post system, with the candidate receiving the plurality of votes winning. For this reason, multi-party coalitions are more common at the mayoral level, with a united political or ethnic slate presented in situations where several candidates may divide the electorate. Assembly elections use open list proportional representation, with the number of assembly members varying by population.

Sarajevo and Istočno Sarajevo are further subdivided into four and six municipalities which also elect assemblies. The mayor of Sarajevo is elected indirectly, while the mayor of Istočno Sarajevo has been elected directly since these elections. The Brčko District is an independent self-administrative unit, electing an assembly which in turn selects a mayor.

Mostar holds elections using the mixed-member proportional representation system where 22 seats are elected in six different city areas and 13 on the city list. The mayor is elected by the city assembly. These were the first elections in Mostar after the political agreement in 2020 and the first to be held in the same time as the rest of the country since the 2008 elections.

== Electoral campaign ==
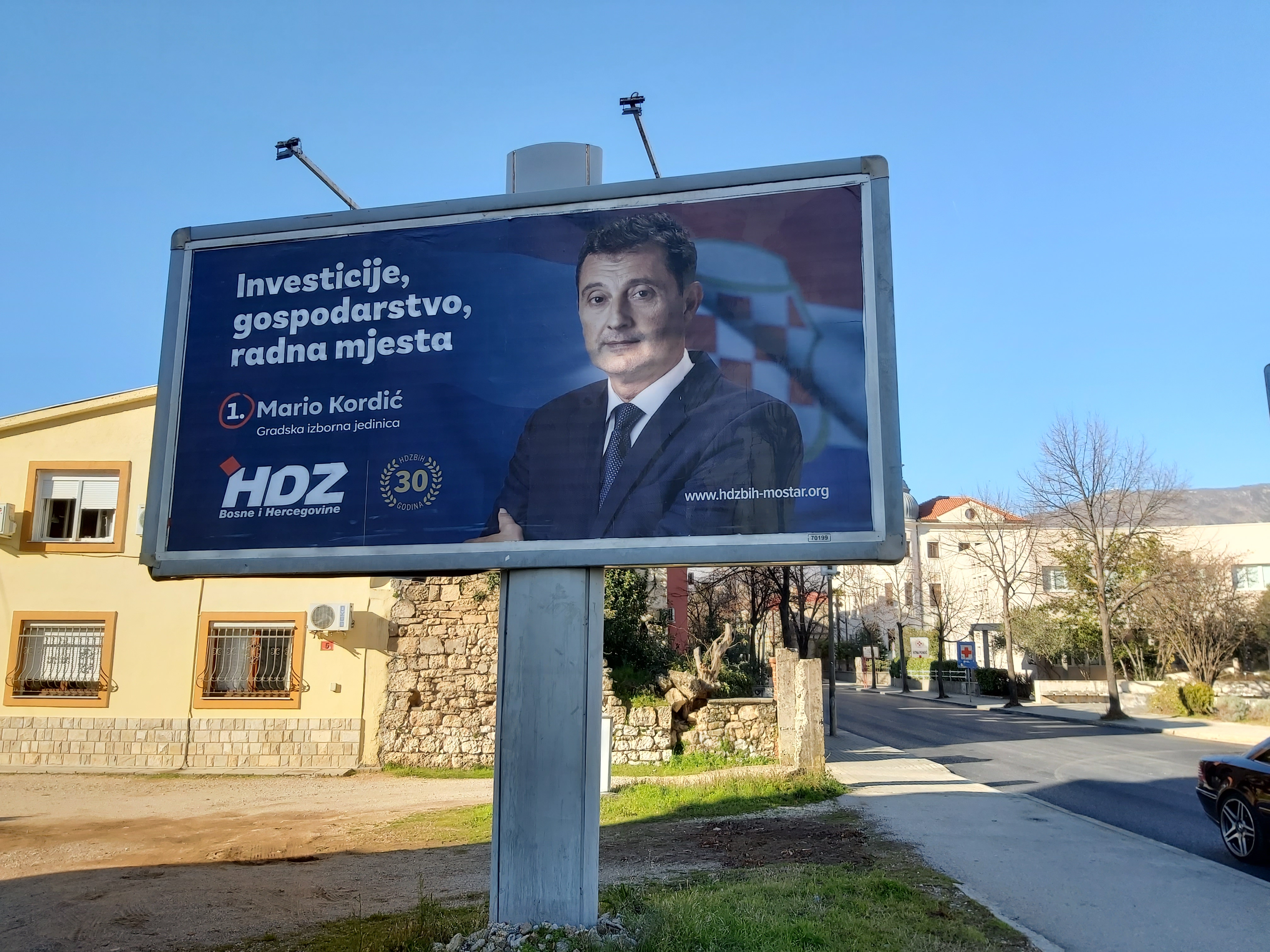
One of HDZ BiH's campaign posters featuring Mostar city council candidate Mario Kordić. The slogan Investments, economy, jobs is positioned above the party's logo

Electoral issues dominated the Bosnian public sphere across September and October, although the electoral campaign officially started only on 16 October. Political parties held large rallies, despite growing COVID-19 cases (over 50,000 cases and 1,234 deaths by 31 October) and in violation of health and safety regulations.

According to Transparency International in Bosnia and Herzegovina (TI BIH), political parties spent almost one million BAM on video production and advertising in TV and print media in the first two weeks of campaign. Almost the entire amount was spent by the main six parties, with the largest share by Banja Luka-based SNSD (351,357) and PDP (325,852 km). Transparency International also recorded multiple examples of abuse of administrative resources by parties in power for electoral purposes.

In Velika Kladuša, outgoing mayor and convicted war criminal Fikret Abdić, under arrest since June for abuse of office, was released to allow him to carry out electoral campaign.

The international High Representative for Bosnia and Herzegovina, Valentin Inzko, noted that the election campaign was "characterized by divisive, negative rhetoric that deepens existing divisions and makes reconciliation in Bosnia and Herzegovina increasingly difficult."

The Central Electoral Commission (CIK) fined several parties for illicit activities before the formal start of the electoral campaign. On 7 October, the CIK banned from elections the United Srpska and fined it BAM 10,000 for diffusion of a video on social media deemed as spreading ethnic hatred. On 15 October, the Court of Bosnia and Herzegovina annulled such decision, as it deemed that the legal provisions referred to by the CIK (Election Law) did not apply to the period ahead the formal start of the electoral campaign. The video continued to be shared by the party on social media in the following weeks.

The number of voters registers from abroad soared to 101,771, alarming judicial institutions to the risk of fraud. The CIK received over 3,500 reports of suspected fraud, particularly in relation to Srebrenica and Brčko. To facilitate the identification of such cases, on 8 October the CIK published on its website the liste of registered mail-in voters, including names and addresses, allowing all citizens to identify and report suspected irregularities. On 14 October the BiH Agency for the Protection of Personal Data requested the removal of the list of registered mail-in voters from the CIK website, citing privacy concerns.

The CIK rejected over 27,000 received applications for voting from abroad and reported suspect cases of fraud to the State-level BiH Prosecutor's Office, which however on 12 October indicated that it rejected jurisdiction on them and advised the CIK to address local judicial institutions.

The local elections were observed remotely by the Council of Europe.

== Results ==
Composition of the Sarajevo City Council following the elections

Turnout reached 50.40%. Governing parties in each communities (Bosniak SDA and Bosnian Serb SNSD) had a lacklustre showing, and opposition candidates won in Sarajevo as well as, unexpectedly, in Banja Luka and Bijeljina. Party leaders (Bakir Izetbegović and Milorad Dodik respectively) acknowledged the loss.

In the Bosnian capital Sarajevo, in its municipality of Centar, the candidate of the opposition coalition Srđan Mandić (Our Party) obtained almost two thirds of the votes. Opposition candidates won 4 municipalities out of 9. Experienced politician, Social Democrat Bogić Bogićević was poised to be elected the next mayor of the city of Sarajevo in the coming weeks by the City Council. In parallel, the alliance of the four opposition parties, colloquially called the Four, also initiated the reshuffle process of the government of the Sarajevo Canton, which they controlled with good results for the first time in 2019, but which returned in March 2020 to the hands of the SDA.

In Zenica the outgoing mayor, the independent Fuad Kasumović, kept the town hall; the SDA candidate, Deputy Minister of Justice Nezir Pivić got only second. Also in Tuzla, the Social Democrat Jasmin Imamović – the longest-serving mayor in Bosnia and Herzegovina, in power since 2001 – maintained control of the cantonal capital, resulting in the lead in all polling stations in town. In Velika Kladuša, war criminal Fikret Abdić, was re-elected, even if only with a very narrow margin on challenger Jasmin Hušić. In Mostar, voting took place on 20 December, for the first time since 2008.

In the Republika Srpska entity, 27-year-old opposition candidate Draško Stanivuković (PDP) won the majority of votes for the post of City mayor of Banja Luka over the outgoing Igor Radojičić (SNSD), a loyalist of Dodik. Stanivuković created a public profile lambasting nepotism and corruption of the ruling party, as well as showing himself closer to the demands of the "Justice for David" movement. Dodik's party had ruled the Bosnian Serb capital since 1998.

The SNSD, with Dalibor Pavlović, instead gained the municipality of Prijedor, a fiefdom of his allied DNS party; that of Doboj, where the previous mayor aligned himself with the SNSD in 2018; and that of Trebinje, where Dodik had promised the construction of an airport – financed by Serbia. In Srebrenica, waiting for the postal votes, the outgoing mayor, Serb Mladen Grujičić, a denier of the genocide, was ahead of just 600 votes; Bosniak parties, which counted on at least 1600 postal votes, declared victory for their candidate Alija Tabaković. Ultimately, Grujičić was re-elected. Finally, in Bijeljina the outgoing mayor Mićo Mićić, in power since 2004, had aligned himself with Dodik, being expelled from the SDS party; he unexpectedly lost his seat to opposition candidate Ljubiša Petrović (SDS/PDP). However, Dodik's coalition obtained a majority in the city council.

=== Mayoral ===
Denotes municipality within city
Denotes municipality changing hands

==== Federation of Bosnia and Herzegovina ====
Municipality	Mayor before	Mayor elected
Banovići	PDA	SDA
Bihać	POMAK	POMAK
Bosanska Krupa	SDP BiH	SDP BiH
Bosanski Petrovac	DNS	SDA
Bosansko Grahovo	Independent	SNSD
Breza	SBB BiH	SDA
Bugojno	SDA	SDA
Busovača	SDA	SDA
Bužim	SDA	SDA
Cazin	A-SDA	A-SDA
Centar	SDA	NS
Čapljina	HDZ BiH	HDZ BiH
Čelić	SDA	SBiH
Čitluk	HDZ BiH	HDZ BiH
Doboj East	SDA	SDA
Doboj South	SDA	SDA
Dobretići	HSS SR	HSS SR
Domaljevac-Šamac	HDZ BiH	HDZ BiH
Donji Vakuf	Independent	Independent
Drvar	SNSD	SNSD
Foča-Ustikolina	SDA	Independent
Fojnica	SDA	SDA
Glamoč	SNSD	SNSD
Goražde	NBL	SDP BiH
Gornji Vakuf-Uskoplje	SDA	SDA
Gračanica	SDP BiH	SDP BiH
Gradačac	SDP BiH	SDP BiH
Grude	HDZ BiH	HDZ BiH
Hadžići	SDA	SDA
Ilidža	SDA	NiP
Ilijaš	SDA	SDA
Jablanica	SDA	SDP BiH
Jajce	SDA	SDA
Kakanj	SDA	SDA
Kalesija	NBL	NBL
Kiseljak	HDZ BiH	HDZ BiH
Kladanj	PDA	PDA
Ključ	SDP BiH	SDP BiH
Konjic	SDA	SDA
Kreševo	HDZ BiH	HDZ BiH
Kupres	HDZ BiH	HDZ BiH
Livno	HDZ BiH	HDZ BiH
Lukavac	SD BiH	SD BiH
Ljubuški	HDZ BiH	HDZ BiH
Maglaj	SDP BiH	SDP BiH
Mostar	HDZ BiH (Note: Local elections have not been held in Mostar since 2008 due to disputes around electoral laws.)	HDZ BiH
Neum	HDZ BiH	HDZ BiH
Novi Grad Sarajevo	SDA	SDA
Novi Travnik	SDA	HDZ BiH
Novo Sarajevo	SDA	Independent
Odžak	HDZ BiH	HDZ BiH
Olovo	SDA	SDA
Orašje	HDZ BiH	HDZ BiH
Pale-Prača	SDA	SDA
Posušje	HDZ BiH	HDZ BiH
Prozor-Rama	HDZ 1990	HDZ 1990
Ravno	HDZ BiH	HDZ BiH
Sanski Most	SDA	SDA
Sapna	PDA	PDA
Sarajevo	SDA	SDP BiH
Srebrenik	Independent	NiP
Stari Grad	NBL	NBL
Stolac	HDZ BiH	HDZ BiH
Široki Brijeg	HDZ BiH	HDZ BiH
Teočak	SDA	SDA
Tešanj	SDA	SDA
Tomislavgrad	HNP	HNP
Travnik	SDA	SDA (Note: The elected Mayor, Mirsad Peco, died on election day, likely necessitating a by-election.)
Trnovo	SDA	SDA
Tuzla	SDP BiH	SDP BiH
Usora	HDZ BiH	HDZ BiH
Vareš	HDZ BiH	HDZ BiH
Velika Kladuša	LS BiH	LS BiH
Visoko	Independent	SDA
Vitez	HDZ BiH	HDZ BiH
Vogošća	SDA	SDA
Zavidovići	NBL	NBL
Zenica	Independent	Independent
Žepče	HDZ BiH	HDZ BiH
Živinice	SDA	SDA

==== Republika Srpska ====
Municipality	Mayor before	Mayor elected
Banja Luka	SNSD	PDP
Berkovići	SDS	SDS
Bijeljina	SDS S	SDS
Bileća	SNSD	SDS
Bratunac	SNSD	Independent
Brod	SNSD	SDS
Čajniče	SDS	SDS
Čelinac	SNSD	SNSD
Derventa	SNSD	SNSD
Doboj	SNSD	SNSD
Donji Žabar	SRS 9J	SNSD
Foča	SNSD	SNSD
Gacko	SDS	SNSD
Gradiška	SNSD	SNSD
Han Pijesak	SNSD	SDS
Istočna Ilidža	SDS	SDS
Istočni Drvar	ZSD	ZSD
Istočni Mostar	SDS	SDS
Istočni Stari Grad	SDS	SDS
Istočno Novo Sarajevo	SNSD	SNSD
Istočno Sarajevo	PDP	SNSD
Jezero	SNSD	SNSD
Kalinovik	SDS	SNSD
Kneževo	Independent	SNSD
Kostajnica	SDS	SNSD
Kotor Varoš	PDP	PDP
Kozarska Dubica	SNSD	SNSD
Krupa na Uni	DNS	DNS
Kupres	SNSD	SNSD
Laktaši	SNSD	SNSD
Ljubinje	SP	SDS
Lopare	SDS	SDS
Milići	SNSD	SNSD
Modriča	SNSD	SDS
Mrkonjić Grad	SNSD	SNSD
Nevesinje	SNSD	SNSD
Novi Grad	SNSD	SNSD
Novo Goražde	SNSD	SNSD
Osmaci	SDS	SNSD
Oštra Luka	DNS	SNSD
Pale	SNSD	SNSD
Pelagićevo	SP	SNSD
Petrovac	DNS	SNSD
Petrovo	SDS	SNSD
Prijedor	DNS	SNSD
Prnjavor	SNSD	SNSD
Ribnik	SNSD	SNSD
Rogatica	SNSD	SNSD
Rudo	SRS RS	SNSD
Sokolac	SDS	SDS
Srbac	SNSD	SNSD
Srebrenica	SNSD	SNSD
Stanari	SNSD	US
Šamac	NDP	SDS
Šekovići	SNSD	DEMOS
Šipovo	SNSD	SNSD
Teslić	SDS	SDS
Trebinje	SNSD	SNSD
Trnovo	SNSD	SNSD
Ugljevik	SDS	SDS
Višegrad	SNSD	SNSD
Vlasenica	SNSD	SNSD
Vukosavlje	SNSD	SNSD
Zvornik	SNSD	SNSD

=== Assembly of Brčko District ===
There are 31 seats in the Assembly of the Brčko District. The seats were divided as follows:

Constituency	Council				Mayor elected by Council		
Constituency	Party	Popular vote	%	Seats	Mayor	Votes	%
Brčko	Party of Democratic Action	6,133	16.46	5	Esed Kadrić, SDA	22	71%
Brčko	SNSD—DEMOS	4,651	12.49	4			
Brčko	Socialist Party	4,396	11.80	4			
Brčko	Croatian Democratic Union	2,973	7.98	3			
Brčko	Union for a Better Future	2,574	6.91	2			
Brčko	People and Justice	2,514	6.75	2			
Brčko	United Srpska	2,307	6.19	2			
Brčko	Party of Democratic Progress	1,873	5.03	2			
Brčko	Party for Bosnia and Herzegovina	1,749	4.70	2			
Brčko	SDP BiH—NS	1,643	4.41	1			
Brčko	Serb Democratic Party	1,638	4.40	1			
Brčko	Democratic People's Alliance	1,428	3.83	1			
Brčko	Minority candidate Alija Denjagić	(535)	—	1			
Brčko	Minority candidate Mejra Šečić	(305)	—	1			
Total		37,252		31			

== See also ==
- 2020 Mostar municipal elections
- 2020 Ilidža local elections
