= Troika (Bosnia and Herzegovina) =

Political alliance in Bosnia and Herzegovina

Troika Trojka
- Leader: Collective leadership
- Founded: August 2020
- Headquarters: Sarajevo
- Ideology: Liberalism; Secularism; Anti-corruption; Multiculturalism; Pro-Europeanism Internal factions: Social democracy; Liberal conservatism
- Political position: Big tent
- HoR BiH: 8 / 42
- HoP BiH: 0 / 15
- HoR FBiH: 27 / 98
- HoP FBiH: 21 / 80
- NA RS: 1 / 83

Troika (Bosnian: Trojka, English translation: three), formerly known as the Four (Bosnian: Četvorka), is a liberal political alliance in Bosnia and Herzegovina. The alliance consists of the Social Democratic Party, the People and Justice party and Our Party.

Formed in August 2020, ahead of the Bosnian municipal elections, and initially called the Four, the alliance had also included the Independent Bosnian-Herzegovinian List, before it left the alliance and renamed it to Troika in 2021. The alliance made noteworthy results in the 2020 municipal elections, most notably in Sarajevo, emerging as the largest political bloc in the capital. Following the 2022 general election, Troika managed to form a coalition government on both the national and Federal level.

== History ==
Originally dubbed as the Four, the alliance consisted of the Social Democratic Party (SDP BiH), People and Justice (NiP), Our Party and the Independent Bosnian-Herzegovinian List (NBL). It was formed for the 2020 Bosnian municipal elections. In the elections, the alliance made significant results in the capital Sarajevo, winning in the municipalities of Centar, Novo Sarajevo, Stari Grad and Ilidža, as well as other major cities in the country.

On 20 November 2020, the alliance announced that Bogić Bogićević accepted the appointment as mayor of Sarajevo following the elections. However, on 24 March 2021, Bogićević decided to pull out of the candidacy because of conflicts in the coalition. This ultimately led to the NBL leaving the group, and renaming the Four to Troika.

Troika, also supported by the Union for a Better Future and the People's European Union, announced SDP BiH vice-president Denis Bećirović's candidacy in the Bosnian general election on 21 May 2022, running for presidency member and representing the Bosniaks. For the Republika Srpska election, the SDP formed the State Movement with nine other Bosniak parties, but NiP and Our Party did not support their candidate. In the general election, held on 2 October 2022, Bećirović was elected to the Presidency, having obtained 57.37% of the vote. Following the election, Troika reached an agreement on the formation of a new government supported by the coalition of the Alliance of Independent Social Democrats (SNSD), the Croatian Democratic Union (HDZ BiH) and the Democratic People's Alliance. Troika also agreed on a coalition alongside the HDZ BiH and Croatian Democratic Union 1990, forming a Federal government in April 2023, with SDP BiH president Nermin Nikšić serving as prime minister in his second term.

Troika, for the most part, repeated its electoral success in the 2024 municipal elections, holding on to every municipality in Sarajevo which they previously held, including Ilidža. The alliance also managed to win in Ilijaš, Bugojno and Donji Vakuf. However, NiP suffered noticeable losses in Sarajevo, losing municipal councilors in all four of the city's municipalities.

In January 2025, the alliance announced that it was rescinding its support for the coalition with the SNSD, following the latter failing to vote for two laws concentrated on European Union accession. The legislation was ultimately passed with votes from the SNSD's opposition in Republika Srpska.

== Member parties ==
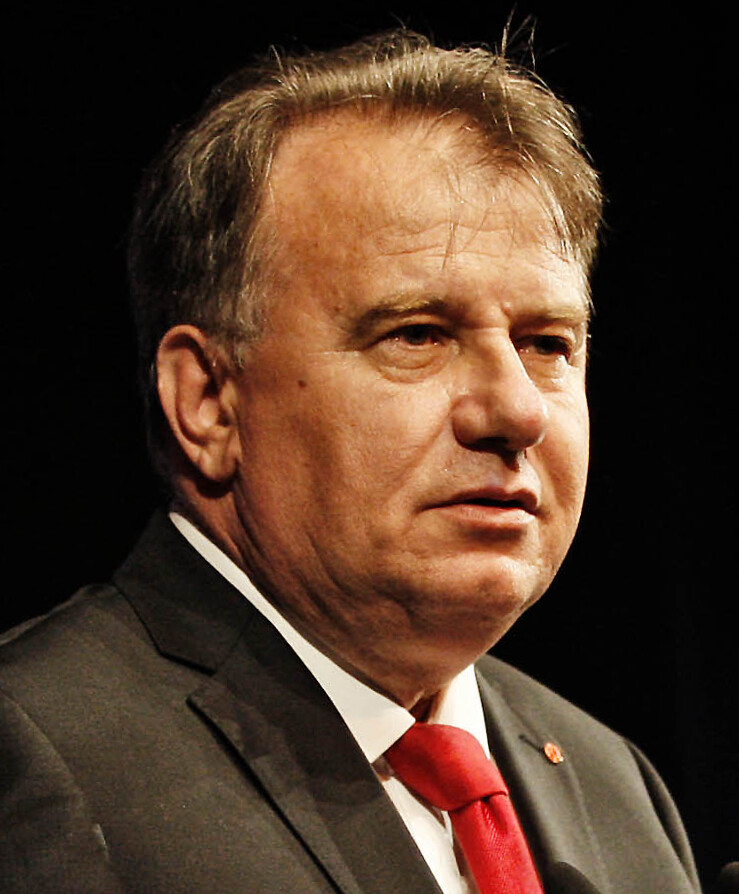
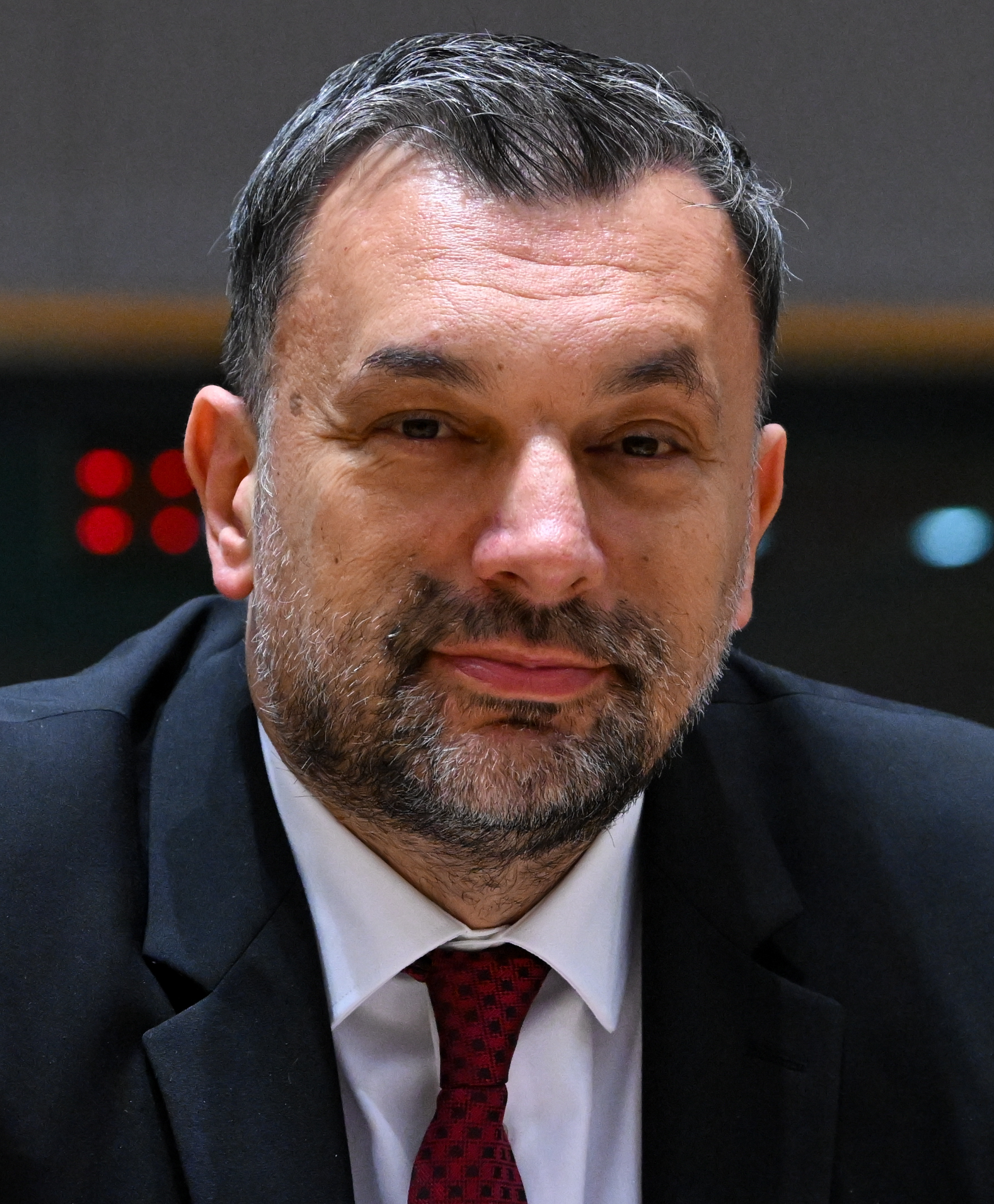
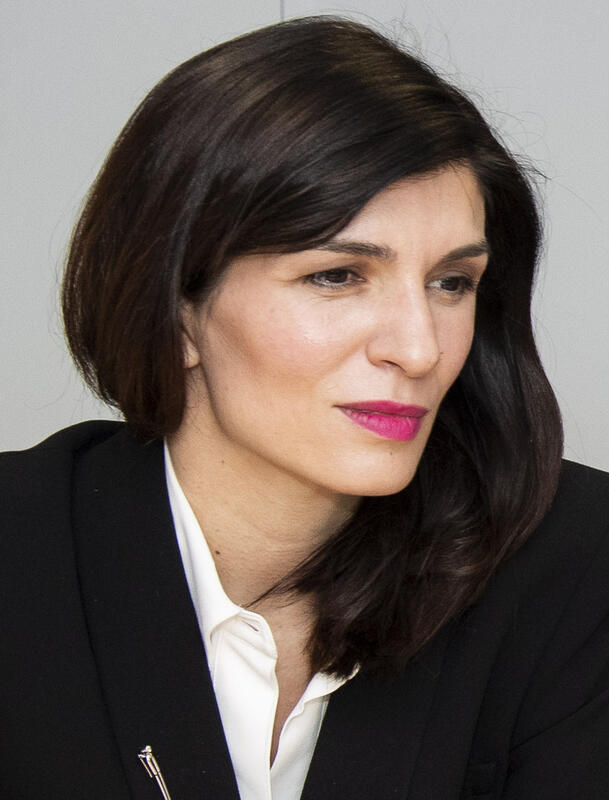
The collective leaders of Troika, from left to right: Nermin Nikšić, Elmedin Konaković and Sabina Ćudić

Name	Abbr.	Leader	Position	Ideology
Social Democratic Party; Socijaldemokratska partija	SDP BiH	Nermin Nikšić	Centre-left to left-wing	Social democracy Pro-Europeanism
People and Justice; Narod i pravda	NiP	Elmedin Konaković	Centre-right	Liberal conservatism Pro-Europeanism; Atlanticism
Our Party; Naša stranka	NS	Sabina Ćudić	Centre to centre-left	Social liberalism Secularism; Pro-Europeanism

== Election results ==
=== Parliamentary Assembly of Bosnia and Herzegovina ===
Parliamentary Assembly of Bosnia and Herzegovina
Year	Popular vote	%	HoR	Seat change	HoP	Seat change	Government
2022	258,535	16.28	10 / 42	New	1 / 15	New	Coalition
2026	206,371	16.10	8 / 42	▼2	TBD	TBD	TBD

=== Parliament of the Federation of Bosnia and Herzegovina ===
Parliament of the Federation of Bosnia and Herzegovina
Year	Popular vote	%	HoR	Seat change	HoP	Seat change	Government
2022	249,338	25.56	28 / 98	New	24 / 80	New	Coalition
2026	197,979	25.80	27 / 98	▼1	TBD	TBD	TBD

=== Presidency elections ===
Presidency of Bosnia and Herzegovina
Election year	#	Candidate	Votes	%	Representing	Elected?
2022	1st	Denis Bećirović	330,238	57.37%	Bosniaks	Yes
2022	3rd	Vojin Mijatović	38,655	6.1%	Serbs	No
2026	1st	Denis Bećirović	215,615	38.12%	Bosniaks	Yes

=== Cantonal elections ===
Cantonal election	Cantonal Assembly										
Cantonal election	Una-Sana	Posavina	Tuzla	Zenica-Doboj	Bosnian Podrinje Goražde	Central Bosnia	Herzegovina-Neretva	West Herzegovina	Sarajevo	Canton 10	Total won / Total contested
2022	6 / 30	1 / 21	11 / 35	9 / 35	5 / 25	6 / 30	4 / 30	0 / 23	18 / 35	2 / 25	62 / 289
