= Bogić Bogićević =

Bosnian politician (born 1953)

Bogić Bogićević Богић Богићевић
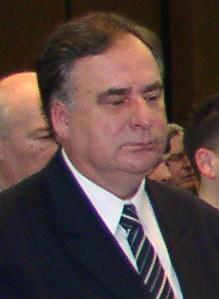
- Bogićević in 2005

5th Member of the Presidency of Yugoslavia for SR Bosnia and Herzegovina
- In office 15 May 1989 – 27 April 1992
- Preceded by: Raif Dizdarević
- Succeeded by: Office abolished
Parliamentary offices
Member of the House of Representatives
In office 29 December 2000 – 3 December 2002
Constituency	3rd Electoral Unit of the FBiH
Additional positions
2nd President of the Olympic Committee of Bosnia and Herzegovina
In office 1997–2001
Preceded by	Stjepan Kljuić
Succeeded by	Zdravko Rađenović

Personal details
- Born: 15 May 1953 (age 73) Ugljevik, SR Bosnia and Herzegovina, SFR Yugoslavia
- Party: Social Democratic Party (1992–present)
- Other political affiliations: SKJ (until 1992)
- Children: 2
- Education: University of Sarajevo

Bogić Bogićević (Serbo-Croatian Cyrillic: Богић Богићевић; born 15 May 1953) is a Bosnian politician who served as the 5th Bosnian member of the Yugoslav Presidency from 1989 until its abolishment in 1992.

Bogićević later served as a member of the national House of Representatives from 2000 to 2002. He was also the president of the Olympic Committee of Bosnia and Herzegovina from 1997 to 2001.

== Early and personal life ==
Bogićević was born into an ethnic Serb family in the Eastern Bosnian town of Ugljevik. He is married and a father of two children.

== Presidency of Yugoslavia (1989–1992) ==
Bogićević was elected member of the Presidency of Yugoslavia by a referendum of the citizens of Bosnia and Herzegovina on 25 June 1989, among five candidates, thus becoming the first democratically elected member of the collective Yugoslav Presidency. In addition, he served as President of Yugoslavia's Federal Council for the Protection of the Constitutional Order.

On 12 March 1991, Bogićević famously defied fellow Presidency members from Serbia on a vote which would have imposed martial law in Yugoslavia. Formally, the military leadership proposed raising combat readiness, but the real goal was to introduce military rule in Slovenia and Croatia and to overthrow the new political leaderships of Kiro Gligorov in Macedonia and of Alija Izetbegović in his native Bosnia and Herzegovina. The pro-Milošević faction, which already controlled the Presidency votes from Serbia (with Vojvodina and Kosovo as separate seats in the Presidency), and Montenegro, counted on his vote as a fellow Serb. Bogićević rejected the proposal, and thus by one vote, the Yugoslav Presidency rejected the imposition of martial law. He reportedly commented on his vote, which historians deemed "fateful": "I am a Serb, but not by profession". His decision was decried by the Serb Democratic Party, who claimed that Bogićević did not represent the Serbs, and he was deprived of his presidential salary as a punishment. He later started working for the Social Democratic Party.

Together with Macedonian Presidency member Vasil Tupurkovski, in July 1991, Bogićević mediated negotiations between the Slovenian government and the Yugoslav People's Army (JNA) Supreme Command on the release of recruits and the unblocking of barracks during the Ten-Day War between the Slovenian Territorial Defence and the JNA.

Bogićević spent the wartime period between 1992 and 1995 in Sarajevo under siege.

== Post-war career ==
In post-war Bosnia and Herzegovina, Bogićević was a member of the national House of Representatives of the Parliamentary Assembly of Bosnia and Herzegovina, and vice president of the Social Democratic Party (SDP BiH). Bogićević was also president of the Olympic Committee of Bosnia and Herzegovina. A poll conducted by the Dani newspaper in 1998 to survey the population of Sarajevo, Banja Luka and West Mostar found that Bogićević was among the most popular politicians in West Mostar and Sarajevo. In 2003, he founded the consulting company Fides, dealing with market research.

On 20 November 2020, Bogićević announced he would accept the appointment as mayor of Sarajevo by the four-party liberal alliance, colloquially called the Four, which was set to govern the City Council after the 2020 Bosnian municipal elections, and that also included the SDP BiH. However, on 24 March 2021, he decided to pull out of the candidacy because of conflicts in the alliance. Ultimately, with Bogićević pulling out, the SDP BiH nominated Benjamina Karić for the post on 5 April 2021, getting unanimously elected by members of the City Council three days later on 8 April.

== Honours ==
=== Awards ===
- In 1999, Bogićević received the Plaque of Humanism, an award given by the Permanent Committee of the International League of Humanists.
- In 2006, the International Centre for Peace Sarajevo awarded him with the traditional award "Freedom".

=== Orders ===
Award or decoration	Country	Awarded by	Year	Place
Order of Duke Trpimir	Croatia	Stjepan Mesić	2002	Zagreb
Silver Order of Freedom	Slovenia	Janez Drnovšek	2004	Ljubljana

=== Honorary citizenship ===
Country	City	Date
Bosnia and Herzegovina	Honorary citizen of Bihać	26 February 2018
Bosnia and Herzegovina	Honorary citizen of Tuzla	2 October 2019
Bosnia and Herzegovina	Honorary citizen of Bosanska Krupa	18 September 2020
Bosnia and Herzegovina	Honorary citizen of Zenica	20 March 2021
