= 2024 Bosnian municipal elections =

- 6 October 2024 (Note: Elections in Kiseljak, Kreševo, Konjic and Fojnica were conducted on 20 October 2024, while in Jablanica they were held on 3 November 2024.)

All 145 municipal/city mayors All 145 municipal/city councils
- Registered: 3,400,204
- Turnout: 45.88% (▼4.52 pp)
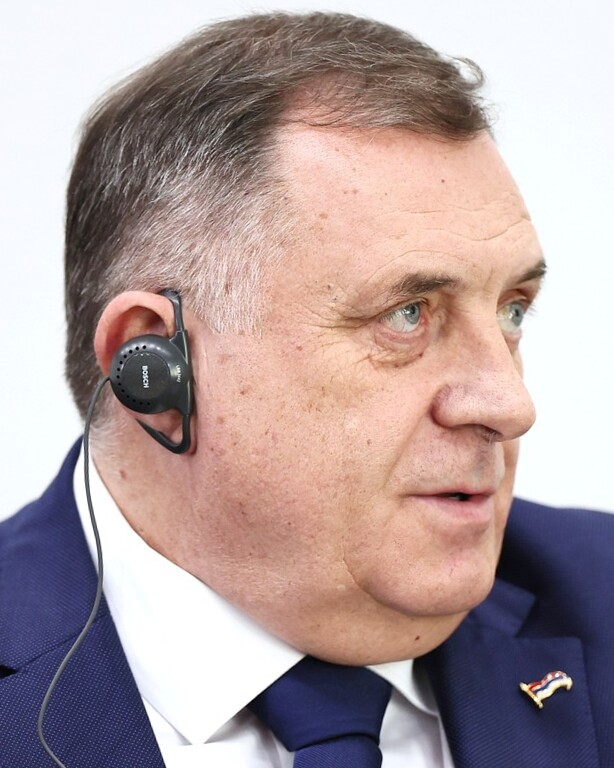

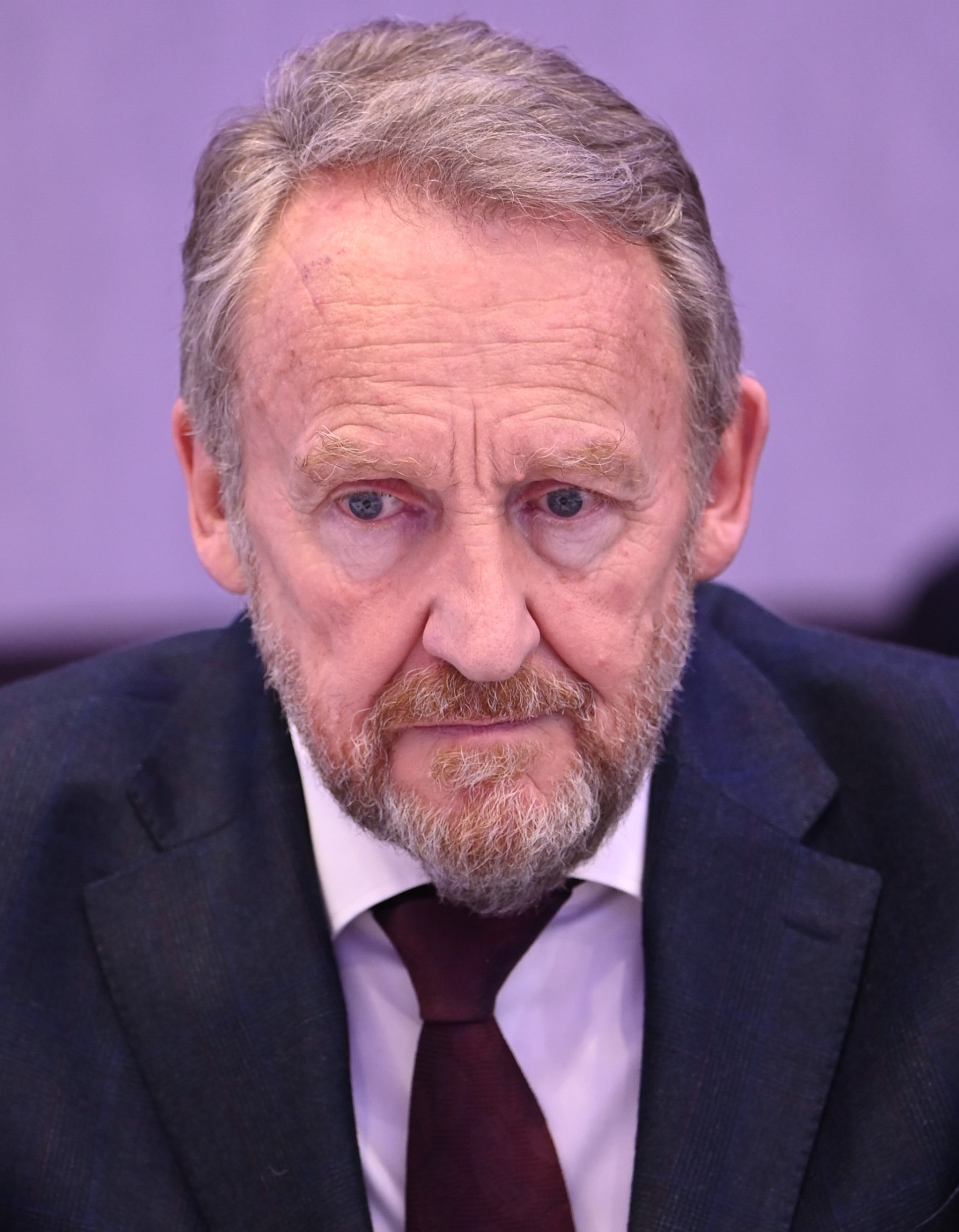

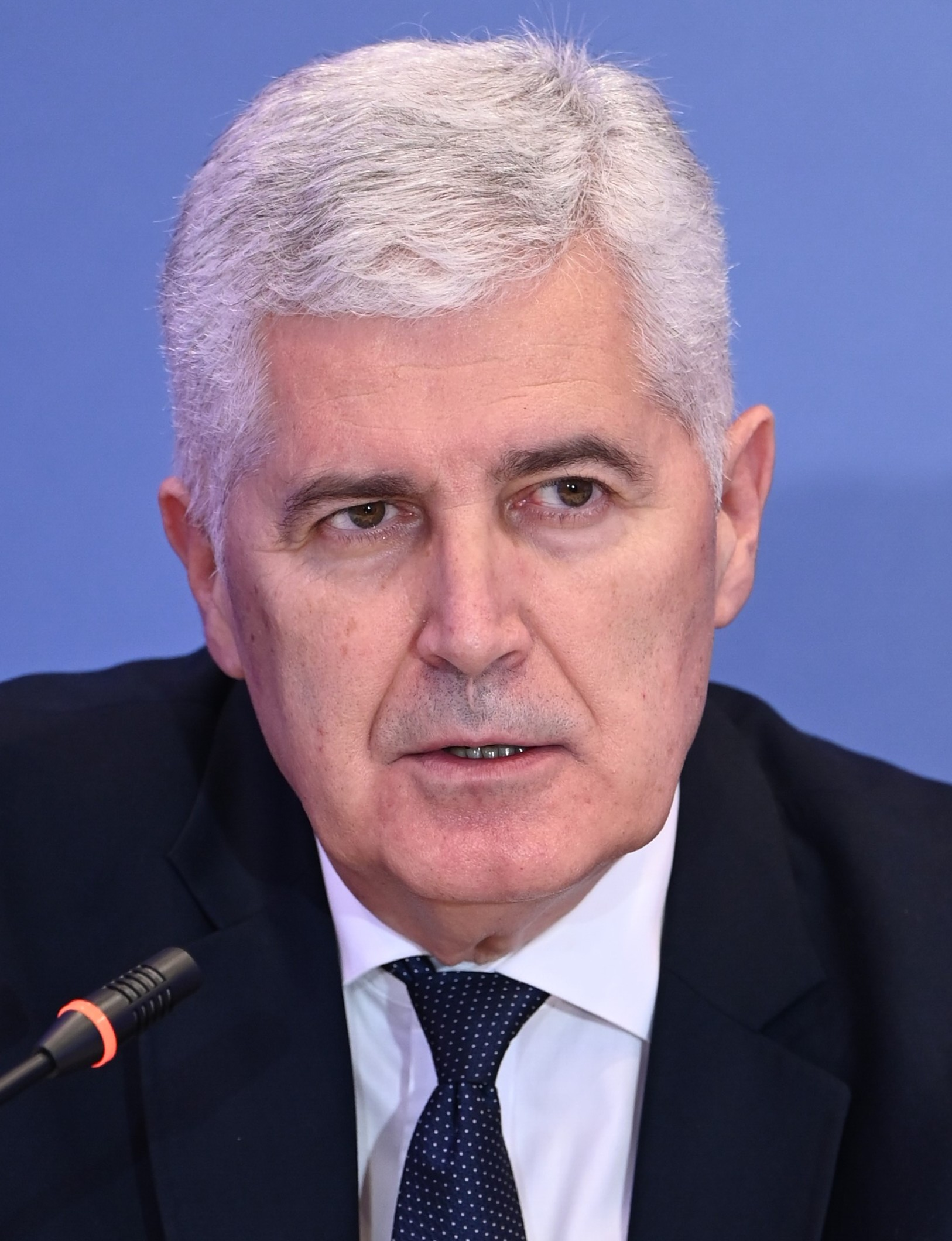

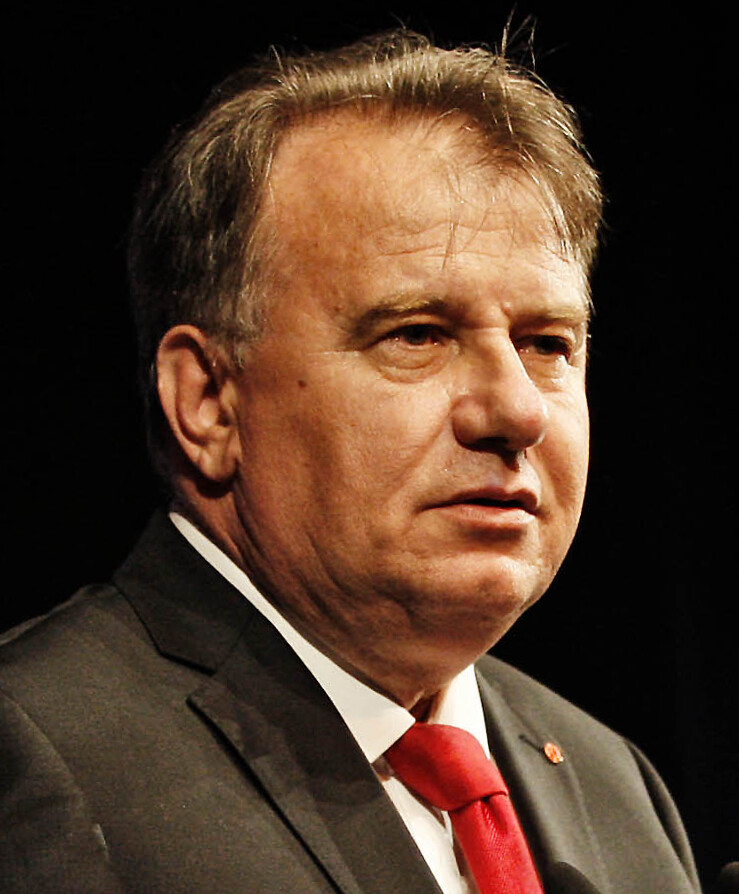

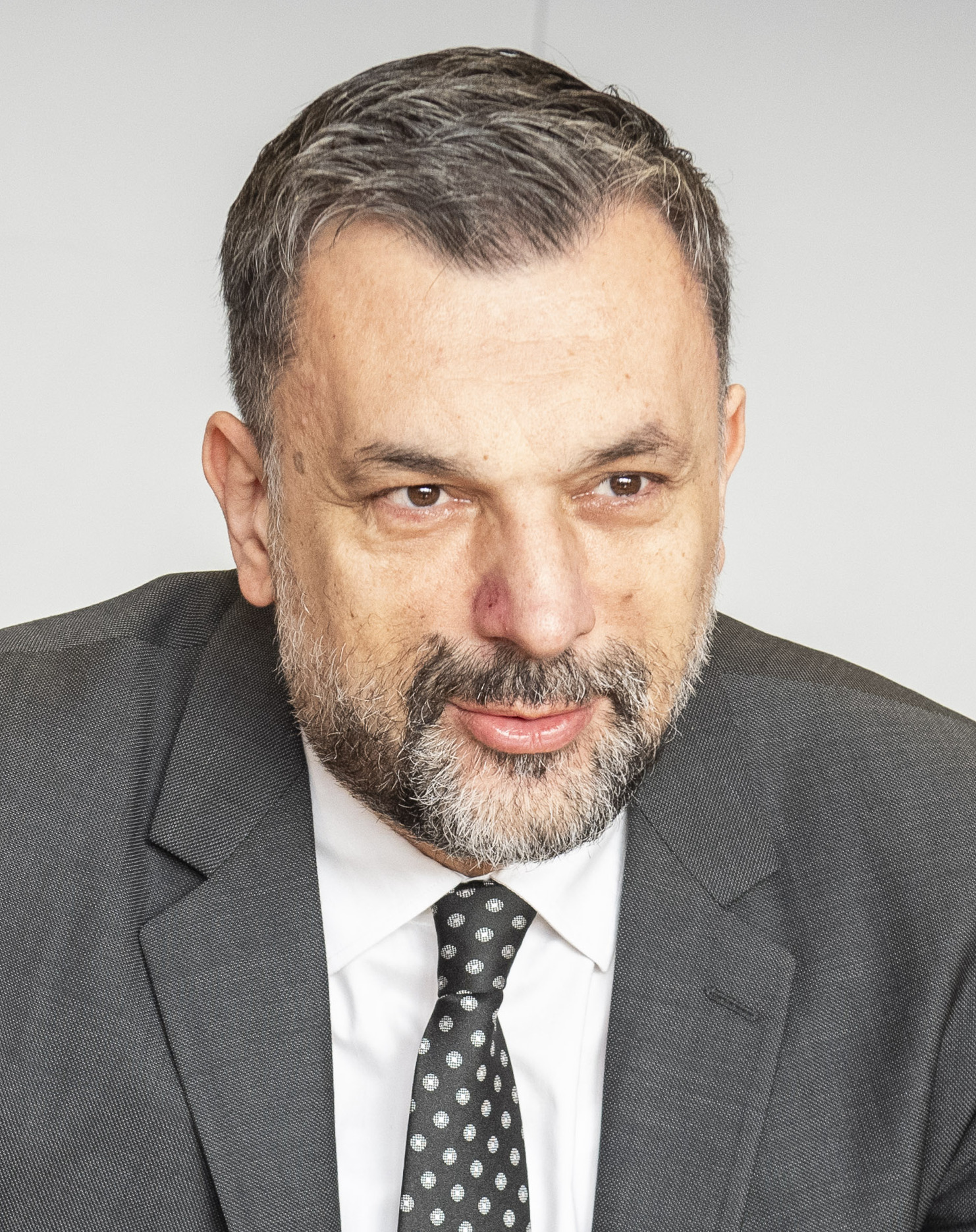
	First party	Second party	Third party
Leader	Milorad Dodik	Bakir Izetbegović	Dragan Čović
Party	SNSD	SDA	HDZ BiH
Mayors	47	32	20
Change	▲3	▲5	▼2
Percentage	32.41%	22.06%	13.79%
	Fourth party	Fifth party	Sixth party
	SDS
Leader	Milan Miličević	Nermin Nikšić	Elmedin Konaković
Party	SDS	SDP BiH	NiP
Mayors	11	8	4
Change	▼5	▼1	▲2
Percentage	7.58%	5.51%	2.75%
- Results by municipality.

Municipal elections were held in Bosnia and Herzegovina on 6 October 2024 to elect mayors and assemblies in 140 municipalities.

Due to sustaining major damage and suffering casualties following heavy floods two days prior, elections were postponed and held on 20 October in the municipalities of, Kiseljak, Kreševo, Konjic and Fojnica. Elections in the town of Jablanica, which suffered most of the flood damage, were held on 3 November 2024.

== Electoral system ==
Municipal elections in Bosnia and Herzegovina comprise the election of a mayor and municipal assembly across the 145 municipalities of the Federation of Bosnia and Herzegovina and Republika Srpska. They are governed by the Law on Elections.

Mayors are elected by a first-past-the-post system, with the candidate receiving the plurality of votes winning. For this reason, multi-party coalitions are more common at the mayoral level, with a united political or ethnic slate presented in situations where several candidates may divide the electorate. Assembly elections use open list proportional representation, with the number of assembly members varying by population.

Sarajevo and Istočno Sarajevo are further subdivided into four and six municipalities which also elect assemblies. The mayor of Sarajevo is elected indirectly, while the mayor of Istočno Sarajevo has been elected directly since the 2020 municipal elections. The Brčko District is an independent self-administrative unit, electing an assembly which in turn selects a mayor. Mostar holds elections using the mixed-member proportional representation system where 22 seats are elected in six different city areas and 13 on the city list. The mayor is elected by the city assembly.

== Results ==
=== Mayoral ===
Denotes municipality within city
Denotes municipality changing hands

==== Federation of Bosnia and Herzegovina ====
Municipality	Mayor before	Mayor elected
Banovići	SDA	PDA
Bihać	POMAK	POMAK
Bosanska Krupa	SDP BiH	SDP BiH
Bosanski Petrovac	SDA	SDA
Bosansko Grahovo	SNSD	Independent
Breza	SDA	SDA
Bugojno	SDA	SDP BiH
Busovača	SDA	SDA
Bužim	SDA	SDA
Cazin	NES	NES
Centar	NS	NS
Čapljina	HDZ BiH	HDZ BiH
Čelić	SBiH	SBiH
Čitluk	HDZ BiH	HDZ BiH
Doboj East	SDA	SDA
Doboj South	SDA	SDA
Dobretići	HSS SR	HSS SR
Domaljevac-Šamac	HDZ BiH	HDZ BiH
Donji Vakuf	Independent	SDP BiH
Drvar	SNSD	SNSD
Foča-Ustikolina	Independent	Independent
Fojnica	SDA	SDA
Glamoč	SNSD	SNSD
Goražde	SDP BiH	SDP BiH
Gornji Vakuf-Uskoplje	SDA	SDA
Gračanica	SDP BiH	SDA
Gradačac	SDP BiH	SDA
Grude	HDZ BiH	HDZ BiH
Hadžići	SDA	SDA
Ilidža	NiP	NiP
Ilijaš	SDA	NiP
Jablanica	SDP BiH	SDA
Jajce	SDA	SDA
Kakanj	SDA	SDA
Kalesija	SDA	SDA
Kiseljak	HDZ BiH	HDZ BiH
Kladanj	PDA	SDA
Ključ	SDP BiH	SDA
Konjic	SDA	SDA
Kreševo	HDZ BiH	HDZ BiH
Kupres	HDZ BiH	HDZ BiH
Livno	HDZ BiH	HDZ BiH
Lukavac	SD BiH	SD BiH
Ljubuški	HDZ BiH	HDZ BiH
Maglaj	SDP BiH	SDA
Mostar	HDZ BiH	HDZ BiH
Neum	HDZ BiH	HDZ BiH
Novi Grad Sarajevo	SBiH	SBiH
Novi Travnik	HDZ BiH	HDZ BiH
Novo Sarajevo	SDP BiH	SDP BiH
Odžak	HDZ BiH	SDA
Olovo	SDA	SDA
Orašje	HDZ BiH	HDZ BiH
Pale-Prača	SDA	SDA
Posušje	HDZ BiH	HDZ BiH
Prozor-Rama	RNS	RNS
Ravno	HDZ BiH	HDZ BiH
Sanski Most	SDA	SDA
Sapna	SDA	SDA
Sarajevo	SDP BiH	NiP
Srebrenik	NiP	NiP
Stari Grad	SDP BiH	SDP BiH
Stolac	HDZ BiH	HDZ BiH
Široki Brijeg	HDZ BiH	HDZ BiH
Teočak	SDA	SDA
Tešanj	SDA	SDA
Tomislavgrad	HNP	HNP
Travnik	SDA	SDA
Trnovo	SDA	SDA
Tuzla	SDP BiH	SDP BiH
Usora	HDZ BiH	HDZ BiH
Vareš	HDS	HDS
Velika Kladuša	LS BiH	Independent
Visoko	SDA	SDA
Vitez	HDZ BiH	HDZ BiH
Vogošća	SDA	SDA
Zavidovići	SN	SDA
Zenica	BHI	BHI
Žepče	HDZ BiH	HDZ BiH
Živinice	SDA	SDA

==== Republika Srpska ====
Municipality	Mayor before	Mayor elected
Banja Luka	PDP	PDP
Berkovići	SDS	SDS
Bijeljina	SDS	SDS
Bileća	SDS	SNSD
Bratunac	SNSD	SNSD
Brod	SDS	SNSD
Čajniče	SDS	SRS 9J
Čelinac	SNSD	SNSD
Derventa	SNSD	SNSD
Doboj	SNSD	SNSD
Donji Žabar	SNSD	SNSD
Foča	SNSD	SNSD
Gacko	SNSD	SDS
Gradiška	SNSD	SNSD
Han Pijesak	SDS	SDS
Istočna Ilidža	SDS	SDS
Istočni Drvar	ZSD	SNSD
Istočni Mostar	SDS	Independent
Istočni Stari Grad	SDS	SDS
Istočno Novo Sarajevo	SNSD	SNSD
Istočno Sarajevo	SNSD	SNSD
Jezero	SNSD	SNSD
Kalinovik	SNSD	SNSD
Kneževo	SNSD	SNSD
Kostajnica	SNSD	SNSD
Kotor Varoš	PDP	PDP
Kozarska Dubica	SNSD	SNSD
Krupa Na Uni	SNSD	NPS
Kupres	SNSD	SP
Laktaši	SNSD	SNSD
Ljubinje	SDS	SDS
Lopare	SDS	SDS
Milići	SNSD	SNSD
Modriča	SDS	SDS
Mrkonjić Grad	SNSD	SNSD
Nevesinje	SNSD	SNSD
Novi Grad	SNSD	SNSD
Novo Goražde	SNSD	SNSD
Osmaci	SNSD	SNSD
Oštra Luka	SNSD	SNSD
Pale	SNSD	DEMOS
Pelagićevo	SNSD	SNSD
Petrovac	SNSD	SNSD
Petrovo	SNSD	SNSD
Prijedor	SNSD	SNSD
Prnjavor	SNSD	SNSD
Ribnik	SNSD	SNSD
Rogatica	SNSD	SNSD
Rudo	SNSD	SNSD
Sokolac	SDS	SNSD
Srbac	SNSD	SNSD
Srebrenica	SNSD	SNSD
Stanari	US	US
Šamac	SDS	SDS
Šekovići	SNSD	SNSD
Šipovo	SNSD	SNSD
Teslić	SDS	SDS
Trebinje	SNSD	SNSD
Trnovo	SNSD	SNSD
Ugljevik	SDS	SNSD
Višegrad	SNSD	SNSD
Vlasenica	SNSD	SNSD
Vukosavlje	SNSD	SDP BiH
Zvornik	SNSD	SNSD

=== Assembly of Brčko District ===
There are 31 seats in the Assembly of the Brčko District. The seats are divided as follows as of 2024:

Constituency	Council				Mayor elected by Council		
Constituency	Party	Popular vote	%	Seats	Mayor	Votes	%
Brčko	Party of Democratic Action	6,024	15.93	4	Siniša Milić, SNSD	24	82.76
Brčko	SNSD—SPS	5,945	15.72	4			
Brčko	SP—DNS—PUP	3,489	9.23	3			
Brčko	United Srpska	3,431	9.07	3			
Brčko	Croatian Democratic Union	3,387	8.96	3			
Brčko	Party of Democratic Progress	2,321	6.14	2			
Brčko	Union for a Better Future	2,271	6.01	2			
Brčko	People and Justice	2,224	5.88	2			
Brčko	Our Party	2,053	5.43	2			
Brčko	Social Democratic Party	1,988	5.26	1			
Brčko	Serb Democratic Party	1,752	4.63	1			
Brčko	Party for Bosnia and Herzegovina	1,385	3.66	1			
Brčko	HSS SR—HDZ 1990	1,201	3.18	1			
Brčko	Minority candidate Alija Denjagić	(276)	—	1			
Brčko	Minority candidate Radoslav Subotić	(157)	—	1			
Total		38,589		31			

== See also ==
- 2024 Mostar municipal elections
