= Mario Kordić =

Bosnian Croat politician (born 1972)

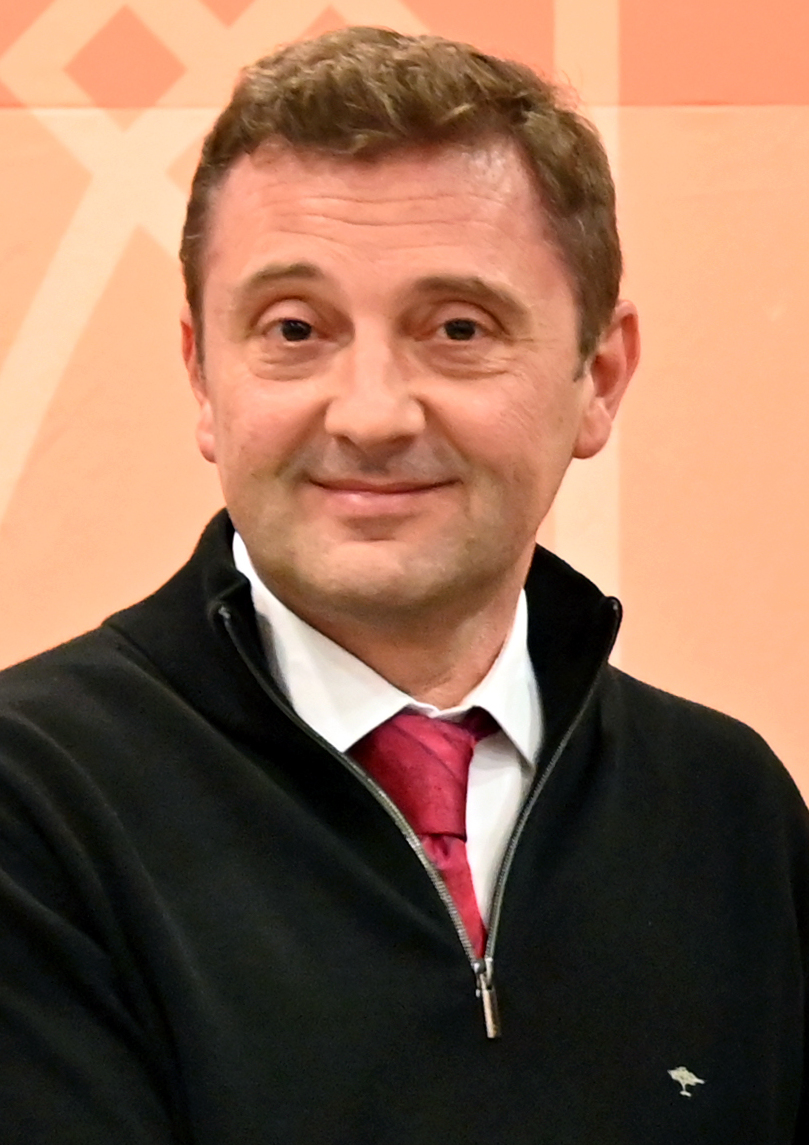
- Kordić in 2021

34th Mayor of Mostar
- Incumbent
- Assumed office 15 February 2021
- Preceded by: Ljubo Bešlić

Personal details
- Born: 28 June 1972 (age 54) Ludwigshafen, West Germany
- Party: Croatian Democratic Union
- Spouse: Andrea Kordić
- Children: 2
- Education: University of Zagreb (MB, MM, MD)

Mario Kordić (born 28 June 1972) is a Bosnian Croat politician and physician serving as the 34th mayor of Mostar since February 2021. He is a member of the Croatian Democratic Union.

Born in Ludwigshafen in 1972, Kordić graduated from the University of Zagreb's School of Medicine. He worked as a practising physician for over twenty years. Following the 2020 municipal elections in Mostar, Kordić was elected mayor in the third round of the city council voting on 15 February 2021.

== Early life and education ==
Kordić was born on 28 June 1972 in Ludwigshafen, West Germany. He graduated with a MB degree from the School of Medicine at the University of Zagreb in 1996. He earned his master's degree in 2011, and his doctorate in 2019.

== Medical career ==
Kordić specialized in urology, and first started working at the Clinical Hospital Dubrava in Zagreb following his graduation. He started working at the University Clinical Hospital in Mostar in 2003. Kordić was the director of the Mostar Community health center from 2016 until 2021.

== Political career ==
The first local elections after a twelve-year intermission were held in Mostar on 20 December 2020, after the Constitutional Court of Bosnia and Herzegovina amended the election regulations relating to the city. The Croatian Democratic Union (HDZ BiH) nominated Kordić as their mayoral candidate.

The city council was constituted on 5 February 2021, and the first round of elections for mayor was held, in which none of the candidates received the required majority. After the first round, High Representative Valentin Inzko sent a message to the councilors that the election in the first round was invalid due to the voting being held in public, which is contrary to the city's statute, which provides for secret voting. For this reason, on February 10, the first round of elections was repeated, which enabled new candidacies. Kordić with 14 votes and Party of Democratic Action member Zlatko Guzin with 12 went to the second round, while the other candidates were eliminated. With no clear majority in the second round, Kordić would ultimately get elected mayor in the third round on 15 February, earning 17 votes opposed to Guzin's 16. This marked the end of Kordić's fellow HDZ BiH member Ljubo Bešlić's seventeen-year mayorship.

== Personal life ==
Kordić is married and has two children. He lives with his family in Mostar.

Political offices
Preceded by Ljubo Bešlić	Mayor of Mostar; 2021–present	Incumbent
