= Ljubo Bešlić =

Bosnian Croat politician (1958–2021)

33rd Mayor of Mostar
- In office December 2004 – 15 February 2021
- Preceded by: Neven Tomić
- Succeeded by: Mario Kordić

Personal details
- Born: 27 July 1958 Mostar, PR Bosnia and Herzegovina, FPR Yugoslavia
- Died: 3 September 2021 (aged 63) Zagreb, Croatia
- Party: Croatian Democratic Union
- Spouse: Dubravka Bešlić
- Children: 3
- Education: University of Mostar (BE)

Ljubo Bešlić (27 July 1958 – 3 September 2021) was a Bosnian Croat politician who served as the 33rd mayor of Mostar from 2004 to 2021. He was a member of the Croatian Democratic Union.

== Early life and career ==
Bešlić was born on 27 July 1958, in Mostar, PR Bosnia and Herzegovina, FPR Yugoslavia. He graduated in 1982 from the Faculty of Mechanical Engineering at the University of Mostar. Bešlić then worked as a professor at the High School of Mechanical Engineering in Mostar, and then at the printing house "Rade Bitanga" of Mostar as the head of the maintenance service. He was actively involved in handball (1972–1990) at the Velež Mostar Handball Club.

From 1992 to 1995, Bešlić served in the Croatian Defence Council during the Bosnian War. In 1996, he got involved in the NATO-led arms reduction programmes. He took part in the establishment of the Ministry of Defence of the Federation of Bosnia and Herzegovina and then worked in the same ministry as head of the Technical Department in the Logistics Sector.

Bešlić was an active member of the Croatian Democratic Union (HDZ BiH) since 2004. In 2015, he was appointed chair of the Cantonal Committee of the HDZ BiH. From 2006 to mid-2009, he was the President of the Association of Municipalities and Cities of the Federation of Bosnia and Herzegovina.

== Mayor of Mostar (2004–2021) ==
A member of the HDZ BiH, Bešlić was appointed deputy mayor of Mostar by the City council in early 2003, and then mayor in mid-December 2004, following the 2004 municipal elections.

He was appointed mayor of Mostar for a second term on 18 December 2009. During his first term the reconstructed Stari most (Old Bridge) entered the UNESCO World Heritage List.

Following an appeal by the HDZ BiH, in November 2010 the Constitutional Court annulled the electoral legislation on Mostar which had been imposed in 2001 by the international High Representative. In the absence of a legal basis, since the Parliament had not acted to replace such legislation, local elections could not take place in Mostar in 2012 and 2016. In the absence of a city council, Bešlić remained as acting mayor for eight additional years, during which he affirmed that he considered resigning multiple times, also due to his deteriorating health. During this time, he shared the administrative duties with Izet Šahović, head of Mostar's Finance Department, a bureaucrat and member of the Bosniak Party of Democratic Action (SDA).

In October 2019, the European Court of Human Rights ruled against Bosnia and Herzegovina in a case on the absence of electoral rights for the residents of Mostar. In July 2020, the Bosnian Parliament amended the electoral law to allow for local elections in Mostar to be held in December 2020. Bešlić, due to his health issues (he was in need of a heart transplant) did not run as candidate councilor. He was succeeded as mayor by fellow HDZ BiH member Mario Kordić on 15 February 2021, marking the end of Bešlić's seventeen-year mayorship.

== Personal life ==
Bešlić was married to Dubravka Bešlić, with whom he had three children. He died on 3 September 2021, in Zagreb from a heart transplant complication. He was 63. Bešlić has been subject to a heart transplant earlier in February.

Political offices
Preceded by Neven Tomić	Mayor of Mostar; 2004–2021	Succeeded by Mario Kordić
