= Independent Bosnian-Herzegovinian List =

Independent Bosnian-Herzegovinian List Nezavisna bosanskohercegovačka lista
- Abbreviation: NBL
- President: Ibrahim Hadžibajrić
- Founder: Association of Municipal Mayors
- Founded: September 30, 2017
- Dissolved: February 27, 2021
- Merged into: People's European Union of Bosnia and Herzegovina
- Headquarters: Sarajevo
- Ideology: Conservatism
- Political position: Centre-right
- Slogan: "NBL - Nova politička realnost Šta hoćemo, a šta nećemo"

The Independent Bosnian-Herzegovinian List (Bosnian: Nezavisna bosanskohercegovačka lista) (NBL) was a political party in Bosnia and Herzegovina based in Sarajevo. The party was created by a group of mayors who were elected in the 2016 Bosnian local elections.

The NBL merged with the Party of Democratic Activity (A-SDA) on 27 February 2021 to create a new party named the People's European Union of Bosnia and Herzegovina (NES). The two parties were dissolved, and the new party became the ruling party in Una-Sana canton. Prior to its dissolution, the party was led by Ibrahim Hadžibajrić.

== See also ==
- List of political parties in Bosnia and Herzegovina
- People's European Union of Bosnia and Herzegovina
- Party of Democratic Activity
