= List of Croatian flags =

This is a list of flags, some of which were used in the past, or used in the present by Croatia and Croats.

== Modern Croatia ==
Flag	Date	Use	Description
	21 December 1990 – present	Flag of Croatia	Three equal horizontal fields, red on the top, white in the middle, and blue on the bottom; with the national coat of arms in the centre.
	21 December 1990 – present	Flag of Croatia (vertical)	

== Standard ==
Flag	Date	Use	Description
	1 November 1990 – present	Standard of the president of Croatia	A square blue field with a border of red and white squares; in the center a version of the national coat of arms surmounted by a red-white-blue ribbon with the letters "RH" (the initials of the country's full name in Croatian, Republika Hrvatska).
	1990 – present	Standard of the prime minister of Croatia	
	1990 – present	Standard of the speaker of the Croatian Parliament	

== Military ==
=== Army ===
Flag	Date	Use	Description
	1991–present	Flag of the Croatian Army	Green background with the shoulder sleeve insignia of the Croatian Army in the center
	1991	Flag of the Croatian National Guard	Green background with the shoulder sleeve insignia of the Croatian National Guard in the center

=== Navy ===
Flag	Date	Party	Description
		Civil and state ensign of Croatia	Identical to the national flag, but with 2:3 proportions.
	1 March 1999 – present	Naval ensign of Croatia (ensign of the Croatian Navy)	Same as the civil ensign, but with two crossed anchors behind the coat of arms.
	1 March 1999 – present	Naval jack of Croatia	A blue field with red and white border, with the national coat of arms and two crossed anchors in the centre.
	1 March 1999 – present	Naval flag defence minister	
	1 March 1999 – present	Naval flag Chief of the General Staff	
	1 March 1999 – present	Naval flag of the General	
	1 March 1999 – present	Flag of the Commander of the Croatian Navy	
	1 March 1999 – present	Flag of an admiral	
	1 March 1999 – present	Flag of an Admiral of the Fleet	
	1 March 1999 – present	Flag of a vice admiral	
	1 March 1999 – present	Flag of a rear admiral	
	1 March 1999 – present	Flag of a commodore	
	1 March 1999 – present	Pennant of the commander of a fleet of naval vessels	
	1 March 1999 – present	Pennant of the commander of a flotilla of naval vessels	
	1 March 1999 – present	Pennant of the commander of a division of naval vessels	
	1 March 1999 – present	Pennant of the commander of a group of naval vessels	
	1 March 1999 – present	Pennant of the most senior commander of a naval vessel	
	1 March 1999 – present	Pennant of the commander of a naval vessel	

=== Air Force ===
Flag	Date	Use	Description
		Flag of Croatian Air Force	Blue flag with the emblem of the Croatian Air Force in the middle.

=== Coast Guard ===
Flag	Date	Use	Description
		Flag of Croatian Coast Guard	Blue flag with the vertical bar bearing the Croatian checkerboard at the hoist and the emblem of the Croatian Coast Guard.

== Police ==
Flag	Date	Use	Description
		Flag of Croatian Police	Blue flag with the emblem of the Croatian Police in the middle.

== Security and Intelligence Agency ==
Flag	Date	Use	Description
		Flag of Security and Intelligence Agency	Blue flag with the emblem of the agency in the middle.

== Subnational flags ==
Flag	Administrative division	Adopted	Description
	Bjelovar-Bilogora County		A horizontal bicolor of yellow and green with the county's coat of arms in the center
	Brod-Posavina County		A blue field with two diagonal white stripes and the county's coat of arms in the center
	Dubrovnik-Neretva County		A horizontal bicolor of red and white with the county's coat of arms in the center
	Istria County		A horizontal bicolor of blue and green with the county's coat of arms in the center
	Karlovac County		A horizontal bicolor of red and yellow with the county's coat of arms in the center
	Koprivnica-Križevci County		Orthogonally quartered red and blue with the county's coat of arms in the center
	Krapina-Zagorje County		A red field with narrow gold stripes at the top and bottom and the county's coat of arms in the center
	Lika-Senj County		Unequal horizontal triband of blue and white with the county's coat of arms in the center
	Međimurje County		A vertical bicolor of white and red with the county's coat of arms in the center
	Osijek-Baranja County		Five unequal horizontal stripes of white and dark blue with the county's coat of arms in the center
	Požega-Slavonia County		Unequal horizontal triband of green and yellow with the county's coat of arms in the center
	Primorje-Gorski Kotar County		A sky blue field with the county's coat of arms between two thin white horizontal stripes
	Šibenik-Knin County		A blue field with the county's coat of arms between two thin white horizontal stripes
	Sisak-Moslavina County		A blue field with narrow red and white stripes along either the hoist or the top side and the county's coat of arms in the center
	Split-Dalmatia County		Unequal vertical stripes of yellow and blue with the county's coat of arms in the center of the yellow part
	Varaždin County		Five horizontal stripes of red and white with the county's coat of arms at the hoist side
	Virovitica-Podravina County		Horizontal triband of blue and white with the county's coat of arms in the center
	Vukovar-Srijem County		Seven horizontal stripes of yellow and white with the county's coat of arms in the center
	Zadar County		Two white and blue horizontal stripes separated by a wavy line, with the county's coat of arms in the center
	Zagreb County		Five horizontal stripes of green and white with the county's coat of arms in the center
	Zagreb		The city's coat of arms on a blue field

== Political flags ==
Flag	Date	Party	Description
Link to file	1989–present	Croatian Peasant Party	
	2015–present	Social Democratic Party of Croatia	
	2005–2008	Social Democratic Party of Croatia	
	1989–present	Croatian Democratic Union	
	1997–present	Socialist Labour Party of Croatia	
	1990–present	Croatian Party of Rights	
	1956–present	Croatian Liberation Movement	Founded in Argentina
	2011–2022	Human Shield	
Link to file	1998–2015	Party of Danube Serbs	
	1991–1993 (officially)	Croatian Defence Forces	Paramilitary arm of the Croatian Party of Rights (HSP)
	1946–1990	League of Communists of Croatia	

== Ethnic groups flags ==
Flag	Date	Use	Description
	9 April 2005–present (1997–present in eastern Slavonia)	Flag of Serbs of Croatia	The Serbian tricolor (a horizontal triband of red, blue, and white). Defined by the Serb National Council.
	?–present	Flag of Pannonian Rusyns in Croatia	The Croatian tricolor (a horizontal triband of red, white, and blue) with a coat of arms that is similar to the coat of arms of Carpathian Ukraine. Defined by the Union of Rusyns of the Republic of Croatia.
	?–present	Flag of Šokci	
	?–present	Flag of Bunjevci	Bicolor flag with a white and a light blue vertical stripe, containing Bunjevci coat of arms and three golden stars in each field's centre, respectively. Recognised by the Bunjevačka matica.
	1990–present	Flag of Italians of Croatia	Tricolor flag with the same color as the flag of Italy, but an aspect ratio of 1:2.
Former
For a more comprehensive list, see List of Yugoslav flags § Ethnic communities.

== Historical flags ==
=== Historical national flags ===
Flag	Date	Use	Description
	27 June – 21 December 1990	Early flag of the Republic of Croatia (federal unit of Yugoslavia). Also flag of Croatian political opposition in exile 1945 – 1990.	Three equal horizontal fields, red on the top, white in the middle, and blue on the bottom, coat of arms of Croatia in the center of the middle field. The first field of the coat of arms was never specified in the Croatian constitution. The flag used Republic of Croatia colors, proportions 1:2.
	18 January 1947 – 27 June 1990	Flag of the Socialist Republic of Croatia (subdivision of SFR Yugoslavia).	A tricolour of red, white, and blue with a (golden-rimmed) red star in the center. The flag used Yugoslav colors, proportions 1:2.
	8 May 1945 – 18 January 1947	Flag of the People's Republic of Croatia (subdivision of FPR Yugoslavia).	A tricolour of red, white, and blue with a red star in the center. The flag used Yugoslav colors, proportions 1:2.
	15 December 1943 – 8 May 1945	Flag of the Federal State of Croatia (provisional subdivision within DF Yugoslavia). (Note: As described in an order by Supreme Headquarters of Yugoslav Partisans on 1 October 1941 as the future flag of Croatia. Flown by Croatian Partisans during World War II.)	A tricolour of red, white, and blue with a red star in the center. The flag used Yugoslav colors, proportions 1:2.
	1941–1945	State flag of the Independent State of Croatia (NDH)	A tricolour of red, white, and blue with the Ustaše symbol in top hoist corner (letter "U" surrounded by Croatian interlace) and the Croatian coat of arms (but with the first field white, as opposed to red) in the center. The flag used Ustaše colors, proportions 2:3.
	1941–1945	Variant of the state flag of the NDH	A variant of tricolour of red, white, and blue with the Ustaše symbol in top hoist corner and the Croatian coat of arms in the center. The flag used Ustaše colors, proportions 2:5.
	1941–1945	Civil flag of the NDH	A tricolour of red, white, and blue without the Ustaše symbol and the Croatian coat of arms. Similar to the Dutch flag, proportions 2:3.
	21 November 1939 – 17 October 1943 (21 January 1941)	Flag of the Banovina of Croatia (subdivision of the Kingdom of Yugoslavia). Used de facto 1939–1941; legally valid 1939–1943.	A tricolour of red, white, and blue. The flag used Yugoslav colors, proportions 2:3.
	21 November 1939 – 17 October 1943 (21 January 1941)	Variant with coat of arms of the flag of the Banovina of Croatia	A tricolour of red, white, and blue. The flag used Yugoslav colors, proportions 2:3.
	29 October – 1 December 1918	Flag of State of Slovenes, Croats and Serbs	A tricolour of red, white, and blue. The flag used Yugoslav colors, proportions 1:2.
	1860–1918	Unofficial, but more common, flag of the Kingdom of Croatia-Slavonia, which used a different crown on top of the shield.	A tricolour of red, white, and blue, with the composite coat of arms of the Triune Kingdom superimposed and centred The flag used Croatian colors, proportions 2:3.
	1860–1918	The tricolour was again made legal in Croatia, and in 1868, made the Flag of the Kingdom of Croatia-Slavonia (subdivision of the Austria-Hungary). State flag, unofficial outside Croatia-Slavonia.	A tricolour of red, white, and blue, with the composite coat of arms of the Triune Kingdom superimposed and centred The flag used Croatian colors, proportions 2:3.
	1860–1918	The tricolour was again made legal in Croatia, and in 1868, made the Civil flag the Kingdom of Croatia-Slavonia (subdivision of the Austria-Hungary). Civil flag, official on all levels.	A tricolour of red, white, and blue. The flag used Croatian colors, proportions 2:3.
	8 March 1852 – 1868	Flag of the Kingdom of Croatia (subdivision of the Austrian Empire). Official on all levels.	Two bars of red and white. The flag used Croatian colors, proportions 1:2. The flag design was similar to the flag of Monaco.
	1848–1852	Flag of the Kingdom of Croatia (subdivision of the Austrian Empire). The flag was banned from 1852 to 1860.	A tricolour of red, white, and blue with the Triune Kingdom coat of arms in the center. The flag used Croatian colors, proportions 1:2.

=== Royal Standards ===
Flag	Date	Use	Description
	1868–1871	Royal bans standard of Baron Levin Rauch	A-side Royal COA, B-side Bans family crest
	1860–1867	Royal bans standard of Baron Josip Šokčević	Red-White-Blue flag, A-side Royal COA, B-side Bans family crest
	1848–1859	Royal bans standard of Count Josip Jelačić Bužimski	Red-White-Blue flag, A-side Royal COA, B-side Bans family crest
	1680–1690	Royal bans standard of Nikola III Erdody	A-side Royal COA, B-side Bans family crest

=== Coronation Standards ===
Flag	Date	Use	Description
	1618	Banner of Croatia at Ferdinand II's coronation	Banner with the arms of Croatia
	1618	Banner of Slavonia at Ferdinand II's coronation	Banner with the arms of Slavonia

=== Historical governmental flags ===
Flag	Date	Use	Description
	1941–1945	Standard of the Poglavnik (Head of State) of the Independent State of Croatia	Standard of the Poglavnik of the Independent State of Croatia
	1941–1945	Flag of Minister of Armed Forces in Independent State of Croatia	
	1941–1945	Flag of Minister in Independent State of Croatia	
	1941–1945	Flag of Vojskovođa (Marshal) in Independent State of Croatia	

=== Historical military flags ===
Flag	Date	Use	Description
Commanders of the Armed Forces of the Independent State of Croatia (1941–1945)
	1941–1945	Flag of Commander of the Armed Forces in Independent State of Croatia	
	1941–1945	Flag of a general of the infantry, artillery, etc. of Independent State of Croatia	
	1941–1945	Flag of a lieutenant general of the Independent State of Croatia	
	1941–1945	Flag of a general of the Independent State of Croatia	
Navy of the Independent State of Croatia (1941–1945)
	1941–1945	Naval ensign of NDH (1941–1944); Naval jack of the NDH (1944–1945)	2:3 squares 5×5 (total ratio 2:3)
	1944–1945	Naval ensign of the NDH (1944-1945)	A tricolour of red, white, and blue and the NDH coat of arms. The flag used Ustaše colors, proportions 2:3.
	1941–1945	Civil ensign of the NDH	A tricolour of red, white, and blue with the Ustaše symbol in top hoist corner, but without the Croatian coat of arms. The flag used Ustaše colors, proportions 2:3.
	1941–1945	Flag of an admiral of the Independent State of Croatia	A simple blue cross on a white field.
	1941–1945	Flag of a vice admiral of Independent State of Croatia	
	1941–1945	Flag of a rear admiral of the Independent State of Croatia	
Air Force of the Independent State of Croatia (1941–1945)
	1941–1945	Flag of the Air Force of the Independent State of Croatia	

=== Historical regional flags ===
Flag	Date	Use	Description
	1820–1918	Flag of the Kingdom of Dalmatia	Two horizontal bars of blue and gold. Proportions 1:2.
	1820–1918	Variant flag of the Kingdom of Dalmatia	Two horizontal bars of faded blue and gold. Proportions 1:2.
	1852–1868	Flag of the Kingdom of Slavonia	Two horizontal bars of blue and silver. Proportions 1:2
	mid 1800's–1852	Flag of the Kingdom of Slavonia	Three horizontal bars of blue, white, and red. Proportions 1:2
	1860–1918	Flag of the Kingdom of Slavonia	Three horizontal bars of blue, white, and red. Proportions 1:2
	1779–1918	Flag of Corpus separatum Rijeka	Three horizontal bars of burgundy red, gold, and blue.
	1849–1918	Flag of Margraviate of Istria in the Austrian Littoral	Three horizontal bars of gold, red, and blue.
	1849–1918	Variant flag of Margraviate of Istria in the Austrian Littoral	Three horizontal bars of gold, red, and blue with the coat of arms of the Austrian Littoral on it.

=== Historical flags (medieval) ===
1444	Flag of Croatian troops in Varna battle	Banner of Croatian soldiers (white flag with black cross) under leadership of Franko Talovac in the battle of Varna
1444	Flag of Croatian troops in Varna battle	Banner (black flag) of Rafael Herczeg's banderium, bishop of Bosnia, in the battle of Varna
Since 1526 or 1527	Flag of Croatian troops	Banner of Croatian troops (chessboard) carried by one of the captains of Croatian ban

=== Republic of Ragusa flags ===
Flag	Date	Use	Description
	1358–1808	Flag of Republic of Dubrovnik	Saint Blaise, patron saint of Dubrovnik, today the official flag of the City of Dubrovnik
	1358–1808	Variant flag of Republic of Ragusa	
	1358–1808	State and war flag and naval ensign	
	1358 – c. 1667	Civil ensign	
	c. 1667–1807	Civil and merchant flag	
	1358–1808	The "Libertas" flag of Dubrovnik	
	1358–1808	Secondary ensign	

=== Other ===
Flag	Date	Use	Description
	1996–1998	United Nations Transitional Administration for Eastern Slavonia, Baranja and Western Sirmium	Flag of the United Nations
	1995–1996	Eastern Slavonia, Baranja and Western Syrmia	Flag of Serbs of Croatia
	1991–1995	Flag of the Republic of Serbian Krajina	A horizontal tricolour of red, blue, and white, charged with the coat of arms.
	1995–1996	War flag of Serbian Krajina	A horizontal tricolour of red, white, and blue, charged with two crossed gold swords.
	1941–1943	Flag of the 369th Croatian Reinforced Infantry Regiment (obverse and reverse)	
	1924–1947	Flag of the Province of Carnaro	
	1918–1941	Flag of the Province of Zara	
	1921	Flag of the Labin Republic	
	1920–1924	Flag of the Free State of Fiume	A horizontal tricolour of red, yellow, and blue.
	1919–1920	Flag of the Italian Regency of Carnaro	
	1919–1920	Ensign of the Italian Regency of Carnaro	

== Flag proposals ==
Flag	Date	Use	Description
	1990	Proposal by Krsto Mažuranić	
	1990	Proposals by Boris Ljubičić	

== Croatian people in other countries ==
Flag	Date	Use	Description
	1992–1996	Flag of the Croatian Republic of Herzeg-Bosnia	A tricolor of red, white, and blue with the coat of arms of Herzeg-Bosnia in the center
	2005–present	Flag of the Croats of Serbia and Montenegro, adopted by the Croat National Council	A tricolor of red, white, and blue with the shield from the coat of arms of Croatia in the center

== Burgees of Croatia ==
Flag	Club
	Opatija
	Orion
	Pesja
	Plav
	Rijeka
	Split
