= Cvitan Galić =

Croatian World War II fighter ace

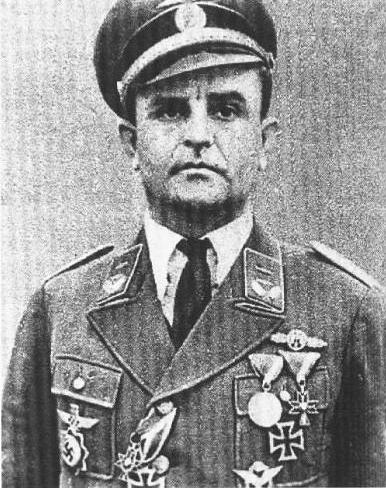
- Born: 29 November 1909; Gorica, Grude, Bosnia and Herzegovina, Austria-Hungary
- Died: 6 April 1944 (aged 34); Banja Luka, Independent State of Croatia
- Burial place: Mirogoj Cemetery
- Spouse: Ana Vocel
- Military career
- Allegiance: Kingdom of Yugoslavia; Independent State of Croatia; Nazi Germany
- Service years: 1932–1944
- Rank: Captain

Cvitan Galić (29 November 1909 – 6 April 1944) was a Croatian World War II fighter ace.

Born in the village of Gorica near Grude, in present-day Bosnia and Herzegovina, Galić finished grade school in the town of Sovići. In 1927 he joined the Royal Yugoslav Air Force completing pilot training with 7. Vazduhoplovni Puk (VP - aviation regiment) at Mostar on 1 November 1930.

During the German-led invasion of Yugoslavia in April 1941, Galić serving with the Mostar-based III. PS. The following month, Galić flew to Sinj where he joined the newly formed Air Force of the Independent State of Croatia. He joined the Croatian Air Force Legion and went to Fürth near Nürnberg for special training before going to the Eastern Front as part of 15 (kroat.)/JG 52, a Croat staffel attached to Jagdgeschwader 52 of the Luftwaffe. Flying a Bf 109E-4, he scored his first victory on 2 March 1942, a R-10 shot down over Magnitovka.

By June 1943 Galić had scored 38 confirmed air victories and had completed 2 tours with the Croatian Air Force Legion. He was awarded the German Cross in Gold on 23 June 1943. From Germany he also received the Iron Cross 1st Class and 2nd Class. He received the Ante Pavelić Award for Bravery which gave him the title of vitez (knight).

He was killed by strafing Spitfire IXs of No.2 Squadron SAAF South African Air Force on 6 April 1944 at Zalužani airfield near Banja Luka when a bomb hit his Morane-Saulnier M.S.406. He had just moments earlier landed after completing a patrol and was in the act of leaving the cockpit when the attack occurred. He was buried at Mirogoj Cemetery, but his grave was destroyed by the Yugoslav Partisans in 1945.

In 439 sorties Galić claimed a DB-3, Pe-2, Spitfire and R-10, two MDR 6 flying boats, five Il-2s, four MiG-ls, four I-153s, five I-16s, five MiG-3s and nine LaGG-3s.
