= Grude (disambiguation) =

Grude is a town in West Herzegovina Canton, Bosnia and Herzegovina.

Grude may also refer to:

- Grude (Hadžići), a village in the municipality of Hadžići, Bosnia and Herzegovina
- Grudë, Albania
- Radio Grude, a Hercegovina commercial radio station
