= Mate Boban =

President of the unrecognised breakaway entity Herzeg-Bosnia from 1991 to 1994

President of Herzeg-Bosnia
- In office 18 November 1991 – 8 February 1994
- Prime Minister: Jadranko Prlić
- Vice President: Dario Kordić
- Preceded by: Office established
- Succeeded by: Krešimir Zubak

President of the Croatian Democratic Union
- In office 14 November 1992 – 10 July 1994
- Preceded by: Milenko Brkić
- Succeeded by: Dario Kordić

Personal details
- Born: 12 February 1940 Sovići, Yugoslavia
- Died: 7 July 1997 (aged 57) Mostar, Bosnia and Herzegovina
- Resting place: Gorica, Bosnia and Herzegovina
- Party: SKJ (1958–1990); Croatian Democratic Union (1990–1997)
- Parents: Stjepan Boban (father); Iva Boban (mother)
- Profession: Politician; Economist
- Awards: Order of Nikola Šubić Zrinski; Order of Ante Starčević; Homeland's Gratitude Medal; Homeland War Memorial Medal

Mate Boban (Croatian pronunciation: [mǎːte bǒban]; 12 February 1940 – 7 July 1997) was a Bosnian Croat politician and one of the founders of the Croatian Republic of Herzeg-Bosnia, an unrecognized entity within the Republic of Bosnia and Herzegovina during the Bosnian War. He was the first president of Herzeg-Bosnia from 1991 until 1994. From 1992 to 1994, Boban was the president of the Croatian Democratic Union.

== Pre-war life ==
Boban was born on 12 February 1940 in a large family in Sovići in the Municipality of Grude in Herzegovina, to Stjepan and Iva Boban. He finished elementary school in Sovići and later he attended seminary in Zadar. After second grade he moved to a high school in Široki Brijeg, and eventually graduated in Vinkovci. In 1958, Boban joined the League of Communists of Yugoslavia. He attended the Faculty of Economics in Zagreb where he obtained an M.A. degree in Economics. After a shorter stay in Grude, he was employed in Imotski where he became the director of the Napredak trading company.

On charges of business fraud, Boban spent two and a half years in a remand prison in Split. He later called it a show trial and said that the reason for his imprisonment was Croatian nationalism. In the late 1980s, he was the head of the Tobacco Factory Zagreb branch in Herzegovina. In 1990, he joined the Croatian Democratic Union (HDZ BiH) and was elected to the parliament in the 1990 general election. In March 1991, Boban became the vice president of the HDZ BiH. As vice president, Boban said in April 1991 that HDZ BiH and the Croat people as a whole advocate the view that Bosnia and Herzegovina is sovereign and indivisible.

== President of Herzeg-Bosnia (1991–1994) ==
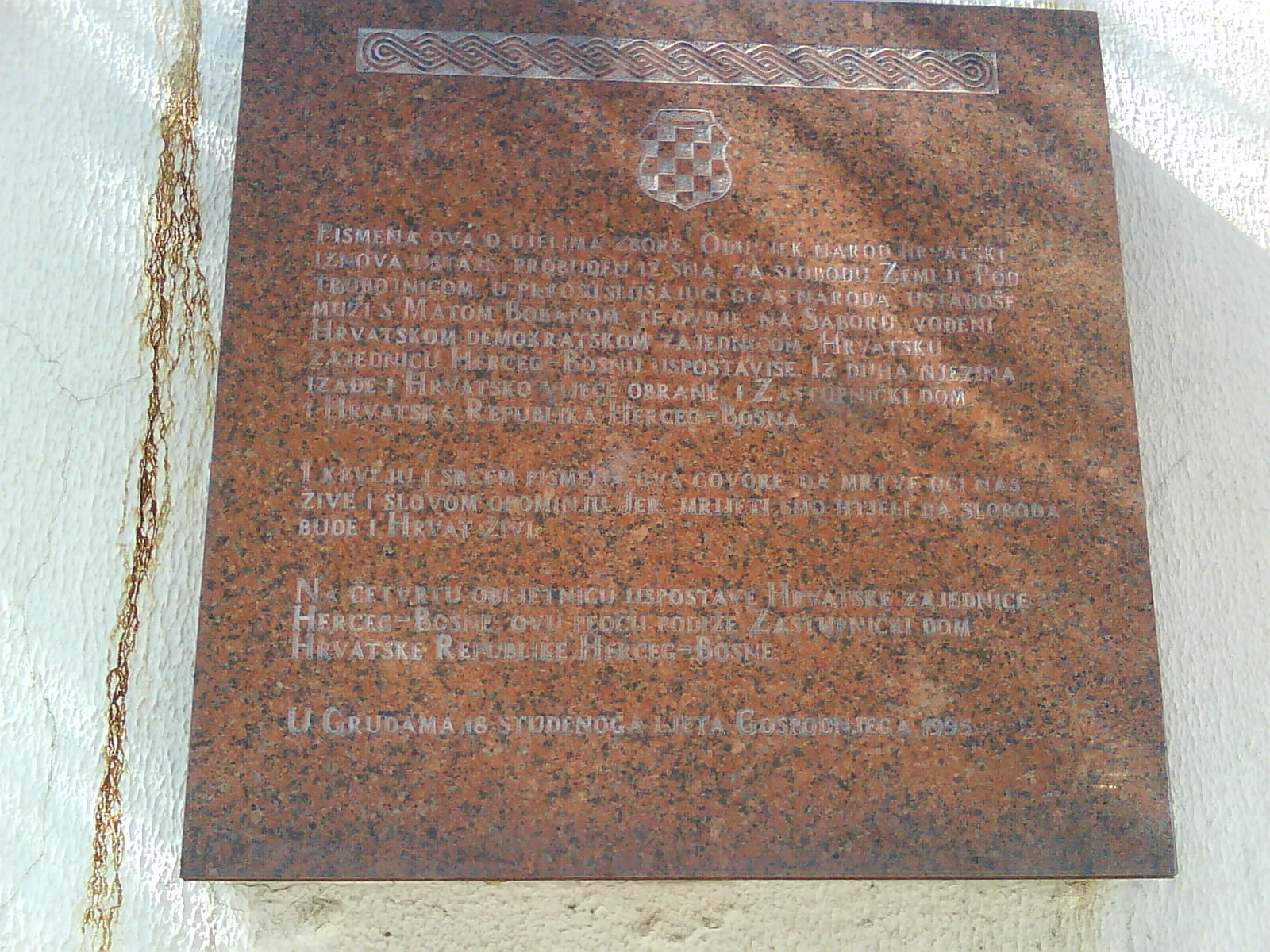
Memorial plaque in Grude, made in tribute of Boban and the leaders of Herzeg-Bosnia

In March 1991, the Croatian War of Independence began. In October 1991, the Croat village of Ravno in Herzegovina was attacked and destroyed by Yugoslav People's Army (JNA) forces before turning south towards the besieged Dubrovnik. These were the first Croat casualties in Bosnia and Herzegovina. Bosnian president Alija Izetbegović did not react to the attack on Ravno and gave a televised proclamation of neutrality, stating that "this is not our war". The leadership of Bosnia and Herzegovina initially showed willingness to remain in a rump Yugoslavia, but later advocated for a unified Bosnia and Herzegovina.

The Croat leadership started organizing a defense in areas with a Croat majority. On 12 November 1991, Boban chaired a meeting with local party leaders of the HDZ BiH, together with Dario Kordić. It was decided that Croats in Bosnia and Herzegovina should institute a policy to bring about "our age-old dream, a common Croatian state" and should call for a proclamation of a Croatian Croatian: banovina as the "initial phase leading towards the final solution of the Croatian question and the creation of sovereign Croatia within its ethnic and historical borders".

On 18 November 1991, Croat representatives established the Croatian Community of Herzeg-Bosnia in Mostar as a "political, cultural, economic and territorial whole". Boban was chosen as its president. The decision on its establishment stated that the Community will "respect the democratically elected government of the Republic of Bosnia and Herzegovina for as long as exists the state independence of Bosnia and Herzegovina in relation to the former, or any other, Yugoslavia". One of Boban's advisers stated that Herzeg-Bosnia was only a temporary measure and that the entire area will be an integral part of Bosnia and Herzegovina when the war ends. When asked why was Herzeg-Bosnia proclaimed, Boban answered:

Proud Bosnia ceased to be proud. Evil is circulating through its roads, railways, air waves. It is occupied. The Croatian people, a proud people, had to do something to not participate in that, to make it clear they don't want it.

HDZ BiH was not unanimous regarding the political organization of the country. Its president, Stjepan Kljuić, opposed the move by Boban. On 27 December 1991, the leadership of the HDZ of Croatia and of HDZ BiH held a meeting in Zagreb chaired by Croatian president Franjo Tuđman. They discussed Bosnia and Herzegovina's future, their differences in opinion on it, and the creation of a Croatian political strategy. At the beginning of the meeting, Boban said that, in the event of Bosnia and Herzegovina's disintegration, Herzeg-Bosnia should be proclaimed "an independent Croatian territory and merged with the Croatian state, but at a time and at a moment when the Croatian leadership … decides that this time and this moment are ripe." Kljuić, on the other hand, favoured a unified Bosnia and Herzegovina on the Bosniak line. He was criticized by Tuđman for acceding to Izetbegović's policies and Bosniak interests. Largely due to the support of the Croatian leadership, Boban's branch of the party prevailed. Kljuić resigned from his position as president of HDZ BiH in February 1992, at a meeting of the party in Široki Brijeg. He was replaced with Milenko Brkić.

Following the declaration of independence of Bosnia and Herzegovina, the Bosnian War began. A Croat–Bosniak alliance was formed in the beginning of the war, but over time there were notable breakdowns of it. On 8 April 1992, the Croatian Defence Council (HVO) was founded as the official military of Herzeg-Bosnia. Mate Boban said that it was formed because "thirteen Croatian villages in the municipality of Trebinje—including Ravno—were destroyed and the Bosnian government did nothing thereafter".

Boban met with Radovan Karadžić, president of Republika Srpska, on 6 May 1992 in Graz, Austria where they reached an agreement for a ceasefire. They discussed the details of the demarcation between a Croat and Serb territorial unit in Bosnia and Herzegovina and stressed the need for further negotiations together with the European Community. However, the conflict continued and on the following day the JNA and Bosnian Serb forces mounted an attack on Croat-held positions in Mostar.

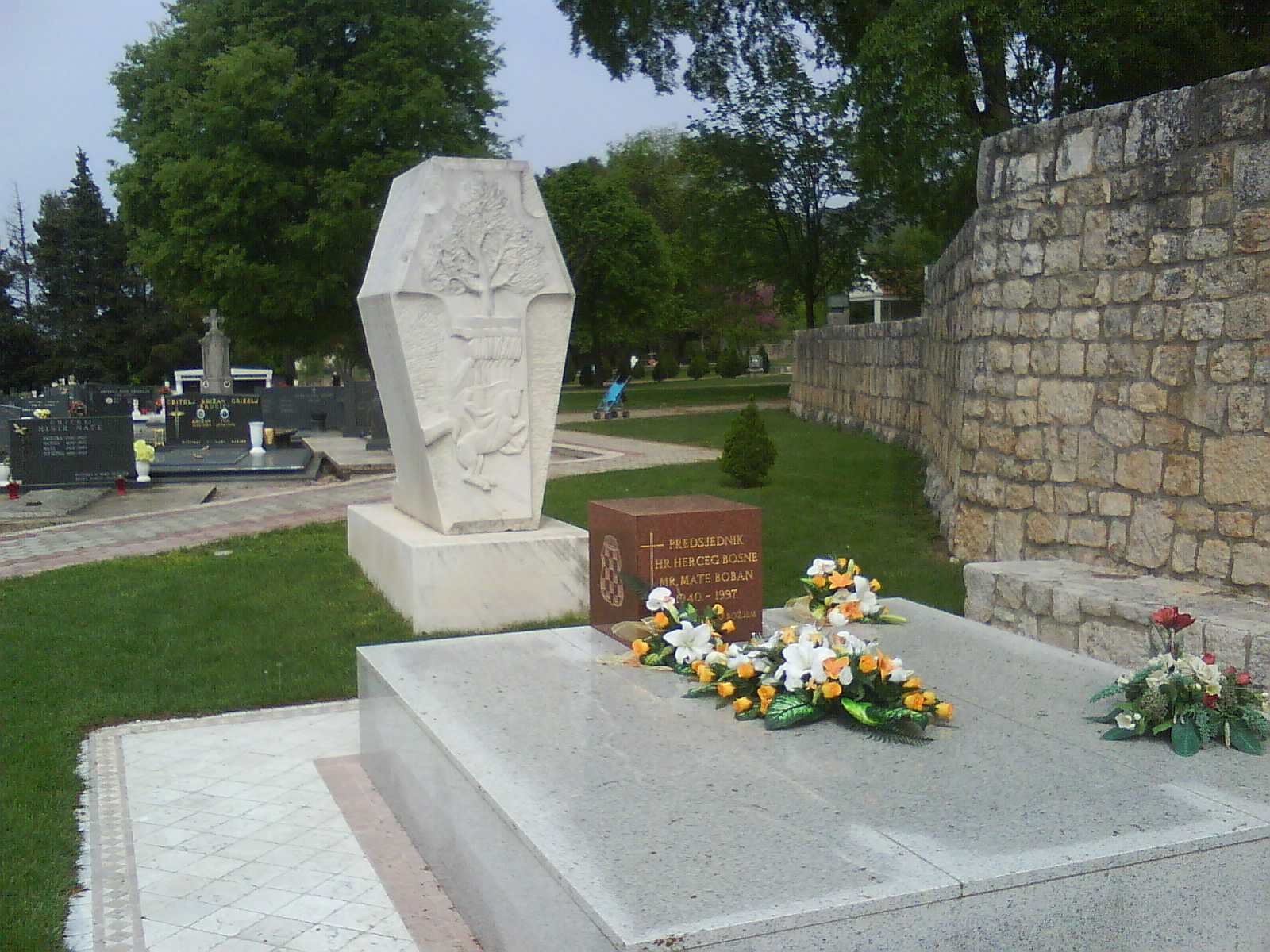
Boban's grave in Gorica

In September 1992, Boban said that "We want an independent Bosnia and Herzegovina, a joint state of three nations in which, like others, Croats will be sovereign". In October 1992, he emphasized that Bosnia and Herzegovina should consist of three constituent units that would be split into several regions. On 14 November, Boban became the president of HDZ BiH.

Throughout late 1992, tensions between Croats and Bosniaks increased and in early 1993 the Croat–Bosniak War fully escalated. Clashes spread in central Bosnia, particularly in the Lašva Valley. In late July 1993 the Owen-Stoltenberg Plan was proposed by United Nations mediators Thorvald Stoltenberg and David Owen that would organize Bosnia and Herzegovina into a union of three ethnic republics. On 28 August, in accordance with the Owen-Stoltenberg peace proposal, the Croatian Republic of Herzeg-Bosnia was proclaimed in Grude as a "republic of the Croats in Bosnia and Herzegovina". However, it was not recognised by the Bosnian government.

In February 1994, Boban resigned as president of Herzeg-Bosnia and was replaced by Krešimir Zubak. The Washington Agreement was signed in March that ended hostilities between Croats and Bosniaks. Under pressure from the international circles, Boban announced his withdrawal from politics. Dario Kordić replaced him as president of HDZ BiH.

In May 2013, the International Criminal Tribunal for the former Yugoslavia, in a first-instance verdict against Jadranko Prlić, found that Boban took part in the joint criminal enterprise against the non-Croat population of Bosnia and Herzegovina.

== Last years ==
After the Washington accords ended the existence of Herzeg-Bosnia, Boban went into retirement. On 4 July 1997 he suffered a stroke and died three days later at a hospital in Mostar.

== Streets named for Mate Boban ==
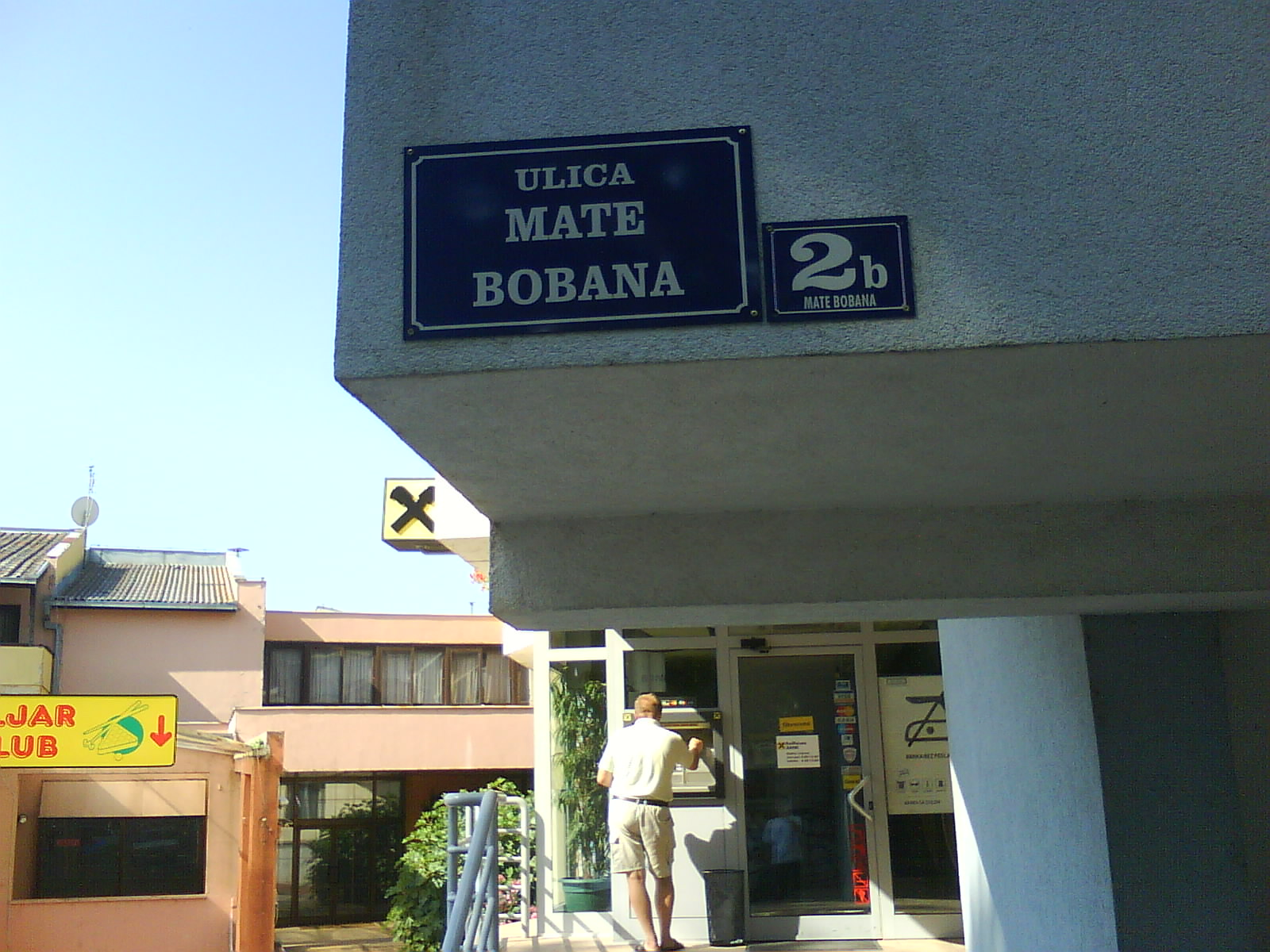
Street named after Boban in Grude

- Ulica Mate Bobana, Grude, 88340
- Ulica Mate Bobana, Čapljina
- Ulica Mate Bobana, Kupres (not completed yet)

== Honours ==
Ribbon	Decoration
	Order of Nikola Šubić Zrinski
	Order of Ante Starčević
	Homeland's Gratitude Medal
	Homeland War Memorial Medal

== Notes ==
Party political offices
Preceded by Milenko Brkić	President of the Croatian Democratic Union; 1992–1994	Succeeded by Dario Kordić
Political offices
Preceded by Office established	President of Herzeg-Bosnia; 1991–1994	Succeeded by Krešimir Zubak
