= Dragićina, Grude =

Village in Grude, Bosnia and Herzegovina

Dragićina
- Village
- Location within Bosnia and Herzegovina
- Coordinates: 43°21′07″N 17°26′55″E
- Country: Bosnia and Herzegovina
- Entity: Federation of Bosnia and Herzegovina
- Canton: West Herzegovina
- Municipality: Grude

Area
  - Total: 2.42 sq mi (6.28 km^{2})

Population (2013)
  - Total: 851
  - Density: 351/sq mi (136/km^{2})
- Time zone: UTC+1 (CET)
  - Summer (DST): UTC+2 (CEST)
- Postal code: 88340

Dragićina is a village in the Municipality of Grude, West Herzegovina Canton of the Federation of Bosnia and Herzegovina in Bosnia and Herzegovina. According to the 1991 census, the village is located in the municipality of Grude.

== Demographics ==
According to the 2013 census, its population was 851.

Ethnicity in 2013
Ethnicity	Number	Percentage
Croats	848	99.6%
Bosniaks	1	0.1%
Serbs	1	0.1%
other/undeclared	1	0.1%
Total	851	100%
