= Football Federation of Herzeg-Bosnia =

N/FSBIH
- Founded: 1993
- N/FSBIH affiliation: 2000

The Football Federation of Herzeg-Bosnia (Croatian: Nogometni savez Herceg-Bosne) served as the top football league in self-proclaimed Croatian Republic of Herzeg-Bosnia (Croatian: Hrvatska Republika Herceg-Bosna) during the Bosnian War and post-war periods of the 1990s. During those years, football was divided along ethnic lines with the Croat, and Serb populations each running their own league. Meanwhile, only the Football Association of Bosnia and Herzegovina was formally recognized as the legitimate football association in Bosnia and Herzegovina.

The league formed in 1993. In the 1997/1998 season, the top Croat teams began facing the top teams from the Football Association of Bosnia and Herzegovina for entrance to UEFA tournaments; something that had been denied the Herzeg-Bosnia league on its own. This setup lasted until the 2000/2001 season when the two leagues merged to form the Premier League of Bosnia and Herzegovina.
