= HKK Grude =

- Leagues: A1 Liga
- Founded: 1976; 49 years ago
- Arena: Športska Dvorana Bili Brig
- Location: Grude, Bosnia and Herzegovina
- Team colors: Blue and white
- President: Tomislav Pejić
- Vice-president(s): Draženko Vranješ
- Head coach: Igor Jelić
- Championships: 4 (2005, 2011, 2016, 2018)
Home	Away

Hrvatski košarkaški klub Grude (transl. Croat Basketball Club Grude), commonly referred to as HKK Grude or simply Grude, is a basketball team from the town of Grude, Bosnia and Herzegovina. Formed in 1976, the club currently competes in the A1 Herzeg Bosnia League.

== History ==
HKK Grude was formed in 1976, by basketball fans in the town of Grude. Soon after foundation, the club formed a youth squad and a female team.

== Honours ==
- Herzeg-Bosnia League:
  - Winners (4): 2005, 2011, 2016, 2018
  - Runner-Up (1): 2021

== Fans ==
HKK Grude does not have an official fan group. Most of the club supporters come from the west Herzegovina region. A small fan group called Uncuti supports the club.

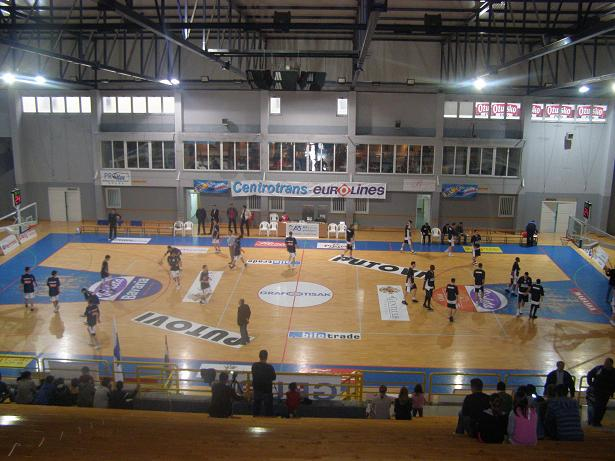
Bili Brig arena

== Current roster ==
Note: Flags indicate national team eligibility at FIBA-sanctioned events. Players may hold other non-FIBA nationalities not displayed.

HKK Grude roster
Players
Coaches

Pos.	No.	Nat.	Name	Ht.	Age
PG	10	(Bosnia and Herzegovina)	Galić, Zlatko	1.81 m (5 ft 11 in)	32 – 16 April 1993
F/C	9	(Bosnia and Herzegovina)	Andrijanić, Nikola	1.98 m (6 ft 6 in)	30 – 9 June 1994
F	5	(Bosnia and Herzegovina)	Leko, Željko	1.95 m (6 ft 5 in)	32 – 17 April 1993
C	13	(Bosnia and Herzegovina)	Mikulić, David	2.01 m (6 ft 7 in)	26 – 13 May 1998
G	11	(Bosnia and Herzegovina)	Andrijanić, Marko	1.95 m (6 ft 5 in)	26 – 8 July 1998
C	14	(Bosnia and Herzegovina)	Galić, Boze	2.03 m (6 ft 8 in)	28 – 13 January 1997
G	4	(Bosnia and Herzegovina)	Alpeza, Luka	1.92 m (6 ft 4 in)	28 – 25 May 1996
G	15	(Bosnia and Herzegovina)	Mikulić, Domagoj	1.94 m (6 ft 4 in)	28 – 9 June 1996
F/C	6	(Bosnia and Herzegovina)	Mikulić, Mateo	1.97 m (6 ft 6 in)	25 – 20 August 1999

Head coach

- (Bosnia and Herzegovina) Igor Jelić

Assistant coach(es)

- (Bosnia and Herzegovina) Stipe Brzica

Legend

- (C) Team captain
- Injured

- Roster
- Transactions
Updated: August 18, 2020
