= Puteševica =

Village in Grude, Bosnia and Herzegovina

- Village
- Location within Bosnia and Herzegovina
- Coordinates: 43°19′N 17°20′E
- Country: Bosnia and Herzegovina
- Entity: Federation of Bosnia and Herzegovina
- Canton: West Herzegovina
- Municipality: Grude

Area
  - Total: 2.28 sq mi (5.90 km^{2})

Population (2013)
  - Total: 117
  - Density: 51.4/sq mi (19.8/km^{2})
- Time zone: UTC+1 (CET)
  - Summer (DST): UTC+2 (CEST)

Puteševica is a village in Bosnia and Herzegovina. According to the 1991 census, the village is located in the municipality of Grude.

== Demographics ==
According to the 2013 census, its population was 117, all Croats.
