= Blaževići =

Village in Grude, Bosnia and Herzegovina

- Village
- Location within Bosnia and Herzegovina
- Country: Bosnia and Herzegovina
- Entity: Federation of Bosnia and Herzegovina
- Canton: West Herzegovina
- Municipality: Grude

Area
  - Total: 1.02 sq mi (2.63 km^{2})

Population (2013)
  - Total: 167
  - Density: 164/sq mi (63.5/km^{2})
- Time zone: UTC+1 (CET)
  - Summer (DST): UTC+2 (CEST)

Blaževići is a village in Bosnia and Herzegovina. According to the 1991 census, the village is located in the municipality of Grude.

== Demographics ==
According to the 2013 census, its population was 167.

Ethnicity in 2013
| Ethnicity | Number | Percentage |
|---|---|---|
| Croats | 166 | 99.4% |
| Bosniaks | 1 | 0.6% |
| Total | 167 | 100% |
