= Borajna =

Village in Grude, Bosnia and Herzegovina

Borajna Борајна
- Village
- Location within Bosnia and Herzegovina
- Country: Bosnia and Herzegovina
- Entity: Federation of Bosnia and Herzegovina
- Canton: West Herzegovina
- Municipality: Grude

Area
  - Total: 2.93 sq mi (7.58 km^{2})

Population (2013)
  - Total: 211
  - Density: 72.1/sq mi (27.8/km^{2})
- Time zone: UTC+1 (CET)
  - Summer (DST): UTC+2 (CEST)

Borajna (Cyrillic: Борајна) is a village in Bosnia and Herzegovina. According to the 1991 census, the village is located in the municipality of Grude.

== Demographics ==
According to the 2013 census, its population was 211.

Ethnicity in 2013
Ethnicity	Number	Percentage
Croats	209	99.1%
Serbs	2	0.9%
Total	211	100%
