= Ružići, Grude =

Village in Grude, Bosnia and Herzegovina

Ružići
- Village
- Location within Bosnia and Herzegovina
- Country: Bosnia and Herzegovina
- Entity: Federation of Bosnia and Herzegovina
- Canton: West Herzegovina
- Municipality: Grude

Area
  - Total: 8.41 sq mi (21.77 km^{2})

Population (2013)
  - Total: 1,688
  - Density: 200.8/sq mi (77.54/km^{2})
- Time zone: UTC+1 (CET)
  - Summer (DST): UTC+2 (CEST)

Ružići is a village in a municipality of Grude, Bosnia and Herzegovina.

== Notable residents ==
- Andrija Nikić
- Ivan Alilović
- Ljubo Jurčić

== Demographics ==
Ružići
Year	1971	1981	1991
Croats	2,181 (99.40%)	1,598 (99.75%)	1,535 (99.03%)
Serbs	7 (0.31%)	0	1 (0.06%)
Yugoslavs	0	1 (0.06%)	0
others	6 (0.27%)	3 (0.18%)	14 (0.90%)
Total	2,194	1,602	1,550

According to the 2013 census, its population was 1,688.
