= Ljubo Jurčić =

Croatian economist and politician

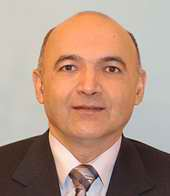

Minister of Economy
- In office 30 July 2002 – 23 December 2003
- Prime Minister: Ivica Račan
- Preceded by: Hrvoje Vojković
- Succeeded by: Branko Vukelić

Member of the Croatian Parliament
- In office 11 January 2008 – 22 December 2011
- Constituency: III electoral district
- In office 22 December 2003 – 11 January 2008
- Constituency: VI electoral district

Personal details
- Born: 20 March 1954 (age 72) Ružići, PR Bosnia and Herzegovina, FPR Yugoslavia
- Children: 1
- Parents: Vlado Jurčić; Milka Jurčić
- Education: University of Zagreb
- Occupation: Economist

Ljubo Jurčić (pronounced [ʎǔːbɔ jûːrtʃitɕ]; born 20 March 1954) is a Croatian economist, current president of the Croatian Association of Economists since 2006 and former Minister of Economy from 2002 to 2003.

== Biography ==
Ljubo Jurčić is a Herzegovinian Croat born in the village of Ružići near Grude, SR Bosnia and Herzegovina, SFR Yugoslavia. Three of his uncles died in World War II, including one Maksimilijan Jurčić, a Franciscan friar who was killed by Yugoslav Partisans in 1945. He graduated from the Faculty of Economics at the University of Zagreb and became a doctor of economic science.

From July 2002 to December 2003 he served as Economy Minister in the second cabinet of Prime Minister Ivica Račan.

Although he was not a member of the ruling Social Democratic Party of Croatia (SDP) party, he was closely aligned with them as a non-partisan economic expert. As head of SDP's Council for Economy and Development, Jurčić formulated SDP's economic strategy that would be implemented should the party win the 2007 elections. The Social Democrats' Main Committee, following a proposal by party chairman Zoran Milanović, named Jurčić as SDP's candidate for the office of Prime Minister.

On 30 November 2007, this decision was reverted, with the election still running, and he was substituted with Zoran Milanović.

Ljubo Jurčić remained in SDP ranks while still showing his definite non-partisan attitude by publicly defending singer Marko Perković Thompson from accusations that arose after his successful May 2008 concert in Ban Jelačić Square. At the same time, he had been published in and is a member of the editorial board of the left-wing magazine Novi Plamen.

On 12 July 2009, Jurčić contended a party primary to be nominated the SDP candidate for the December 27 presidential elections, but was defeated by the Law professor and musician Ivo Josipović.

In May 2011, Jurčić left SDP and became an independent representative in the Parliament. In September 2011, Jurčić announced that his new party Croatian Economic Initiative (Hrvatska ekonomska inicijativa) would enter into a pre-election coalition with the Bloc Pensioners Together (Blok Umirovljenici zajedno). On 6 October 2011, he signed a formal pre-election coalition agreement with the representatives of the Party of Pensioners and the Alliance of Primorje-Gorski Kotar. By November, they named their coalition "Znati kako" and extended it to include another small party, the Croatian Labour Party. Their election lists failed to enter the parliament.
