= Drinovačko Brdo =

Village in Grude, Bosnia and Herzegovina

- Village
- Location within Bosnia and Herzegovina
- Country: Bosnia and Herzegovina
- Entity: Federation of Bosnia and Herzegovina
- Canton: West Herzegovina
- Municipality: Grude

Area
  - Total: 2.76 sq mi (7.16 km^{2})

Population (2013)
  - Total: 396
  - Density: 143/sq mi (55.3/km^{2})
- Time zone: UTC+1 (CET)
  - Summer (DST): UTC+2 (CEST)

Drinovačko Brdo is a village in Bosnia and Herzegovina. According to the 1991 census, the village is located in the municipality of Grude.

It is located at the Bosnia-Croatia border.

== Demographics ==
According to the 2013 census, its population was 396.

Ethnicity in 2013
Ethnicity	Number	Percentage
Croats	393	99.2%
other/undeclared	3	0.8%
Total	396	100%
