= Flag of the Croatian Republic of Herzeg-Bosnia =

Croatian Republic of Herzeg-Bosnia
- Use: Small vexillological symbol or pictogram in black and white showing the different uses of the flag
- Proportion: 1:2
- Adopted: 1992 (Herzeg-Bosnia); 26 March 1996 (West Herzegovina)
- Design: A horizontal tricolor of red, white and blue with the coat of arms of the Croatian Republic of Herzeg-Bosnia in the centre

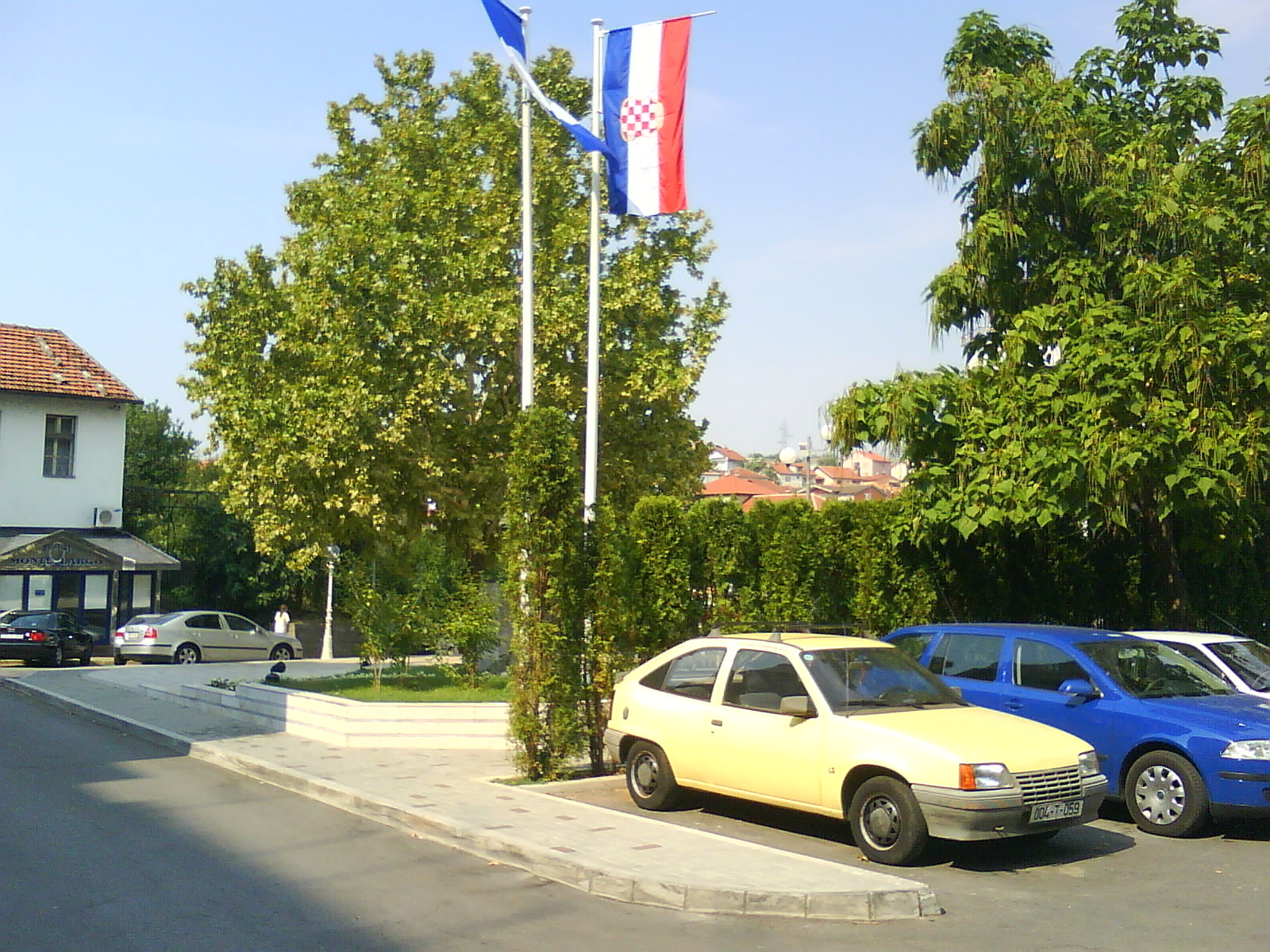
Herzeg-Bosnia flag flying in Široki Brijeg

The flag of the abolished Croatian Republic of Herzeg-Bosnia (1992–96) consists of three equal size, horizontal stripes in the pan-Slavic colours arranged in Croat tricolour: red, white and blue. In the middle is the coat of arms of the Croatian Republic of Herzeg-Bosnia stylised with a triple wattle at the top. In 1997 and 1998 the Constitutional Court of the Federation of Bosnia and Herzegovina ruled its usage as a canton flag unconstitutional, since the symbols of cantons and municipalities cannot represent just one ethnic group.

== Usage ==
The flag was adopted by the short-lived Croatian Republic of Herzeg-Bosnia in 1992 as a variation of Croatian flag and used throughout the war. Since the entity's incorporation into the Federation of Bosnia and Herzegovina in 1994–96, the flag has come to represent Croats in the country. However, no official decision has been made about it, since no body has the competency to decide upon this matter. Between 1994 and 1996, before the Bosniak-Croat Federation adopted its own symbols, three flags were hoisted in the sessions of the Parliament of the Federation: the flag of Bosnia and Herzegovina of the time, the flag of Bosniaks, and the flag of Herzeg-Bosnia "(that is, the flag of Bosnian Croats, red-white-blue with chequy coat of arms)."

In 1997 and 1998 the Constitutional Court of the Federation of Bosnia and Herzegovina ruled its usage in office unconstitutional. As an unofficial flag of Bosnia and Herzegovina's Croats, it is present in the office of Croat member of state presidency, as well as in many Croat-majority municipalities and schools in the country. Croatian National Assembly uses it regularly, just as all mainstream Croat political parties in Bosnia and Herzegovina.

=== Canton flag ===
Since the creation of Bosniak-Croat Federation of Bosnia and Herzegovina in 1994 and the establishment of its 10 cantons in 1996, as Herzeg-Bosnia was abolished, it was used as the official flag of three Croat-majority cantons (Posavina Canton, Canton 10 and West Herzegovina Canton). Posavina Canton changed its flag in 2000 and adopted new official symbols, while it is still used in West Herzegovina Canton and Canton 10, where new official canton and municipal symbols have not yet been adopted.

== Other flags of Bosnian Croats ==
Flag that represented Croats in the constituent assembly of Federation of Bosnia and Herzegovina, March 1994

Flag of Croat Self-Rule (2001)

Flag of the Croatian Brigade in the Army of the Federation (1999–2004)

== See also ==
- Flag of Croats of Serbia
- Coat of arms of the Croatian Republic of Herzeg-Bosnia
- Symbols of Croats in Bosnia and Herzegovina
- List of flags of Bosnia and Herzegovina
