= Sovići =

Village in Grude, Bosnia and Herzegovina

- Village
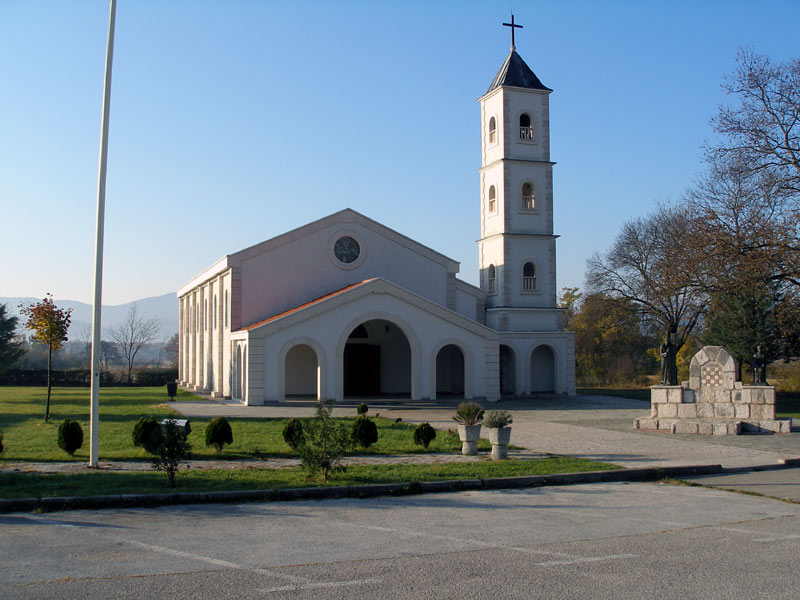

- Location within Bosnia and Herzegovina
- Country: Bosnia and Herzegovina
- Entity: Federation of Bosnia and Herzegovina
- Canton: West Herzegovina
- Municipality: Grude

Area
  - Total: 11.54 sq mi (29.88 km^{2})

Population (2013)
  - Total: 2,771
  - Density: 240.2/sq mi (92.74/km^{2})
- Time zone: UTC+1 (CET)
  - Summer (DST): UTC+2 (CEST)

Sovići (Serbian Cyrillic: Cовићи) is a village in the Municipality of Grude in West Herzegovina Canton of the Federation of Bosnia and Herzegovina in Bosnia and Herzegovina.

== Demographics ==
According to the 1991 Yugoslav census, there were 2,629 residents in the village of Sovići, of which 2,625 were ethnic Croats. According to the 2013 census, its population was 2,771.

Ethnicity in 2013
Ethnicity	Number	Percentage
Croats	2,764	99.7%
Serbs	1	0.0%
other/undeclared	6	0.2%
Total	2,771	100%

== Notable residents ==
- Rafael Boban
- Mate Boban
