= Coat of arms of the Croatian Republic of Herzeg-Bosnia =

- Armiger: Croatian Republic of Herzeg-Bosnia; West Herzegovina Canton
- Adopted: 1992

The Coat of arms of the Croatian Republic of Herzeg-Bosnia is the variation of the historical Croatian coat of arms (chequy of 25 red and white squares) in the form of a stylized Polish heraldic shield with triple wattle on top. It is bordered by golden lines.

== Usage ==
The coat of arms was adopted by the short-lived Croatian Republic of Herzeg-Bosnia in 1992 as a variation of Croatian coat of arms and used throughout the war. It was also present on its military insignia, most notably in Croatian Defence Council (HVO). Entity's vehicle registration plates also sported arms of Herzeg-Bosnia.

Since the entity's incorporation into the Federation of Bosnia and Herzegovina in 1994-6, this Herzeg-Bosnian variation of Croatian chequy has not been officially used on entity or state level. The Federation insignia 1996-2007 included a regular-shaped Croatian chequy, identical to the coat of arms of Croatia without the crown. Such Croatian coat of arms has been used in the Croat components and units in the Federation's and Country's armed forces, too.

However, as a part of the flag of Bosnia's Croats, Herzeg-Bosnian coat of arms is widely present as an unofficial symbol of country's Croats. For example, as a part of the flag it can be found in the office of Croat member of state presidency, as well as in many Croat-majority municipalities and schools in the country. Students’ report cards in secondary schools in Jajce have been marked with the coat of arms of Herzeg-Bosna. Herzeg-Bosnia's coat of arms is a part of the Croatian National Assembly's logo, while its variations are used by some Croat political parties in Bosnia and Herzegovina (most notably, Croatian Party of Rights of Herzeg-Bosnia).

=== Canton coat of arms ===
Since the creation of Bosniak-Croat Federation of Bosnia and Herzegovina in 1994 and the establishment of its 10 cantons in 1996, as Herzeg-Bosnia was abolished, its coat of arms was used as the official symbol of three Croat-majority cantons (Posavina Canton, Canton 10 and West Herzegovina Canton). In 1997 and 1998 the Constitutional Court of the Federation of Bosnia and Herzegovina ruled its usage as a canton symbol unconstitutional, since the symbols of cantons and municipalities cannot represent just one ethnic group. Posavina Canton changed its coat of arms in 2000, while it is still used as an official coat of arms of West Herzegovina Canton (since Croats comprise 98,8% of the population) and, controversially, Canton 10 (with 77% of Croats). It is also part of the logo of public companies such as Canton 10's forestry company "Herzeg-Bosnian Forests."

== Gallery ==
The Croatian chequy, known in Croatian as the "šahovnica" is one of the most recognizable symbols of Croats. It was used as Herzeg-Bosnia symbols (1991–92) and throughout the Bosnian war (1992–95). This emblem was used on the flag of the Federation of Bosnia and Herzegovina and the coat of arms of the Federation of Bosnia and Herzegovina as the official symbol of the Bosnian Croats (1996–2007).
Patch of 1. Infantry (Guard) Regiment of Bosnia and Herzegovina Armed Forces
Coat of arms of the Federation of Bosnia and Herzegovina (1996–2007)
Logo of Croatian Party of Rights of Herzeg-Bosnia

== See also ==
- Flag of the Croatian Republic of Herzeg-Bosnia
