= Radio Grude =

Grude; Bosnia and Herzegovina
- Broadcast area: West Herzegovina Canton

Programming
- Language: Croatian language
- Format: Urban music, entertainment, talk, news

History
- First air date: 18 November 1998

Technical information
- Transmitter coordinates: 43.3747°N 17.4096°E

Links
- Webcast: On website
- Website: www.radiogrude.net

Radio Grude is a Herzegovinian commercial radio station, broadcasting from Grude, Bosnia and Herzegovina.

Radio Grude was launched on 18 November 1998.

== Frequencies ==
The program is currently broadcast on 3 frequencies:

- Grude 95.5 MHz
- Grude 90.9 MHz
- Mostar 90.9 MHz

== See also ==
- List of radio stations in Bosnia and Herzegovina
