= Croatian Republic of Herzeg-Bosnia =

Unrecognized proto-state in the Balkans (1991–1996)

Croatian Community of Herzeg-Bosnia Hrvatska Zajednica Herceg-Bosna (Croatian) (1991–1993) Croatian Republic of Herzeg-Bosnia Hrvatska Republika Herceg-Bosna (Croatian) (1993–1996)
- 1991–1996
- Flag Coat of arms
- Anthem: Lijepa naša domovino (de facto) "Our Beautiful Homeland"
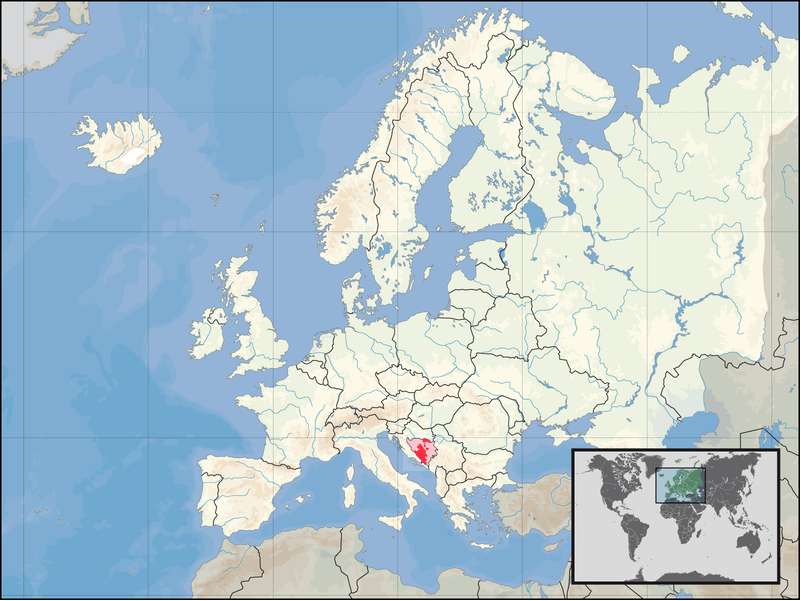
- Location of the Croatian Republic of Herzeg-Bosnia (shown in red) within Bosnia and Herzegovina (shown in pink)

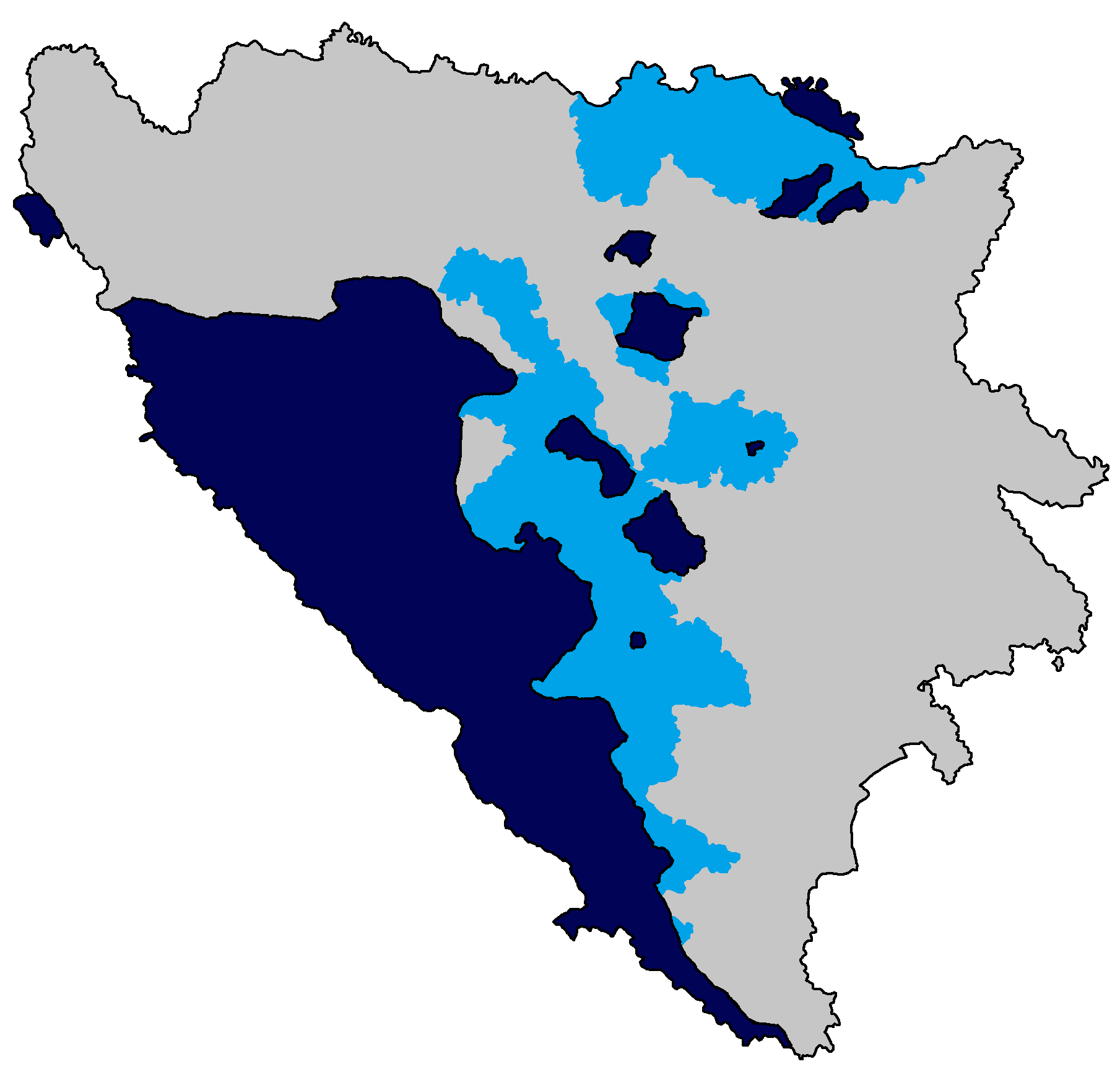
- Herzeg-Bosnia at its greatest territorial extent in late 1995 after Operation Southern Move Territory controlled in October 1995 Territory claimed
- Status: Defunct unrecognized quasi-state in Bosnia and Herzegovina
- Capital and largest city: Mostar; 43°20′37″N 17°48′27″E
- Official languages: Croatian
- Religion: Catholic Christianity (majority)
- Government: Republic
- President
  - 1991–1994: Mate Boban
  - 1994–1996: Krešimir Zubak
- Prime Minister
  - 1993–1996: Jadranko Prlić
  - 1996: Pero Marković
- Legislature: Assembly of the Croatian Republic of Herzeg-Bosnia
- Historical era: Yugoslav Wars
  - Community proclaimed: 18 November 1991
  - Bosnian War: 6 April 1992
  - Declared unconstitutional^{a}: 14 September 1992
  - Croat–Bosniak War: 18 October 1992
  - Republic proclaimed: 28 August 1993
  - Washington Agreement: 18 March 1994
  - Formally abolished: 14 August 1996

Area
  - 1995: 12,937 km^{2} (4,995 sq mi)
- Currency: Official: Bosnia and Herzegovina dinar Parallel: Deutsche Mark, Croatian dinar
Preceded by	Succeeded by
Socialist Republic of Bosnia and Herzegovina	Federation of Bosnia and Herzegovina
- 1. By the Constitutional Court of the Republic of Bosnia and Herzegovina.

The Croatian Republic of Herzeg-Bosnia (Croatian: Hrvatska Republika Herceg-Bosna) was an unrecognized geopolitical entity and quasi-state in Bosnia and Herzegovina. It was proclaimed on 18 November 1991 under the name Croatian Community of Herzeg-Bosnia (Croatian: Hrvatska Zajednica Herceg-Bosna) as a "political, cultural, economic and territorial whole" in the territory of Bosnia and Herzegovina, and abolished on 14 August 1996.

The Croatian Community of Bosnian Posavina, proclaimed in northern Bosnia on 12 November 1991, was joined with Herzeg-Bosnia in October 1992. In its proclaimed borders, Herzeg-Bosnia encompassed about 30% of the country, but did not have effective control over the entire territory as parts of it were lost to the Army of Republika Srpska (VRS) at the beginning of the Bosnian War. The armed forces of Herzeg-Bosnia, the Croatian Defence Council (HVO), were formed on 8 April 1992 and initially fought in an alliance with the Army of the Republic of Bosnia and Herzegovina. Their relations deteriorated throughout late 1992, which led to the Croat–Bosniak War.

The Constitutional Court of the Republic of Bosnia and Herzegovina declared Herzeg-Bosnia unconstitutional on 14 September 1992. Herzeg-Bosnia formally recognized the Government of the Republic of Bosnia and Herzegovina and functioned as a state within a state, while some in its leadership advocated the secession of the entity and its unification with Croatia.

On 28 August 1993, Herzeg-Bosnia was declared a republic following the proposal of the Owen-Stoltenberg Plan, envisioning Bosnia and Herzegovina as a union of three republics. Its capital city was Mostar, which was then a war zone, and the effective control center was in Grude. In March 1994, the Washington Agreement was signed that ended the conflict between Croats and Bosniaks. Under the agreement, Herzeg-Bosnia was to be joined with Bosniaks into the Federation of Bosnia and Herzegovina, but it continued to exist until it was formally abolished in 1996.

The Hague Tribunal ruled that Herceg-Bosna served as a means for pursuing a joint criminal enterprise whose aim was to create a Croatian entity in Bosnia and Herzegovina, one with an overwhelming Croat majority, and to ultimately annex that entity to the Republic of Croatia. This involved the leadership and authorities of Herceg-Bosna, the Croatian Defence Council, the HDZ and HDZ BiH, as well as members of various Croatian armed forces and intelligence services. Members of the wartime leadership of Herceg-Bosna were indicted or convicted before the ICTY for the gravest crimes under international law, including ethnic cleansing, crimes against humanity, and war crimes committed against Bosnian Muslims and Serbs.

== Etymology ==
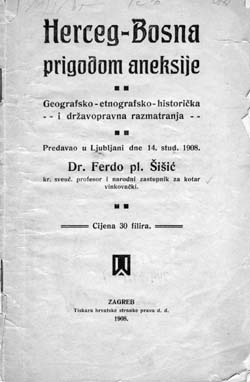
Ferdo Šišić's book from 1908 with Herceg-Bosna in the title

The term Herzeg-Bosnia (Croatian: Herceg-Bosna) appeared in the late 19th century and was used as a synonym for Bosnia and Herzegovina without political connotations. It was often found in folk poems as a more poetic name for Bosnia and Herzegovina. One of the earliest mentions of the term was by Croatian writer Ivan Zovko in his 1899 book Croatianhood in the Tradition and Customs of Herzeg-Bosnia. Croatian historian Ferdo Šišić used the term in his 1908 book Herzeg-Bosnia on the Occasion of Annexation. In the first half of the 20th century the name Herzeg-Bosnia was used by historians such as Hamdija Kreševljaković and Dominik Mandić and Croatian politicians Vladko Maček and Mladen Lorković. Its usage decreased in the second half of the 20th century until 1991 and the proclamation of the Croatian Community of Herzeg-Bosnia. Since the 1990s, it has been used as a name for a Croat territorial unit in Bosnia and Herzegovina.

After the Washington Agreement was signed in March 1994 and the Federation of Bosnia and Herzegovina was created, one of its cantons was named the Herzeg-Bosnia Canton. In 1997, that name was declared unconstitutional by the Constitutional Court of the Federation of Bosnia and Herzegovina, and officially renamed Canton 10.

== Background ==
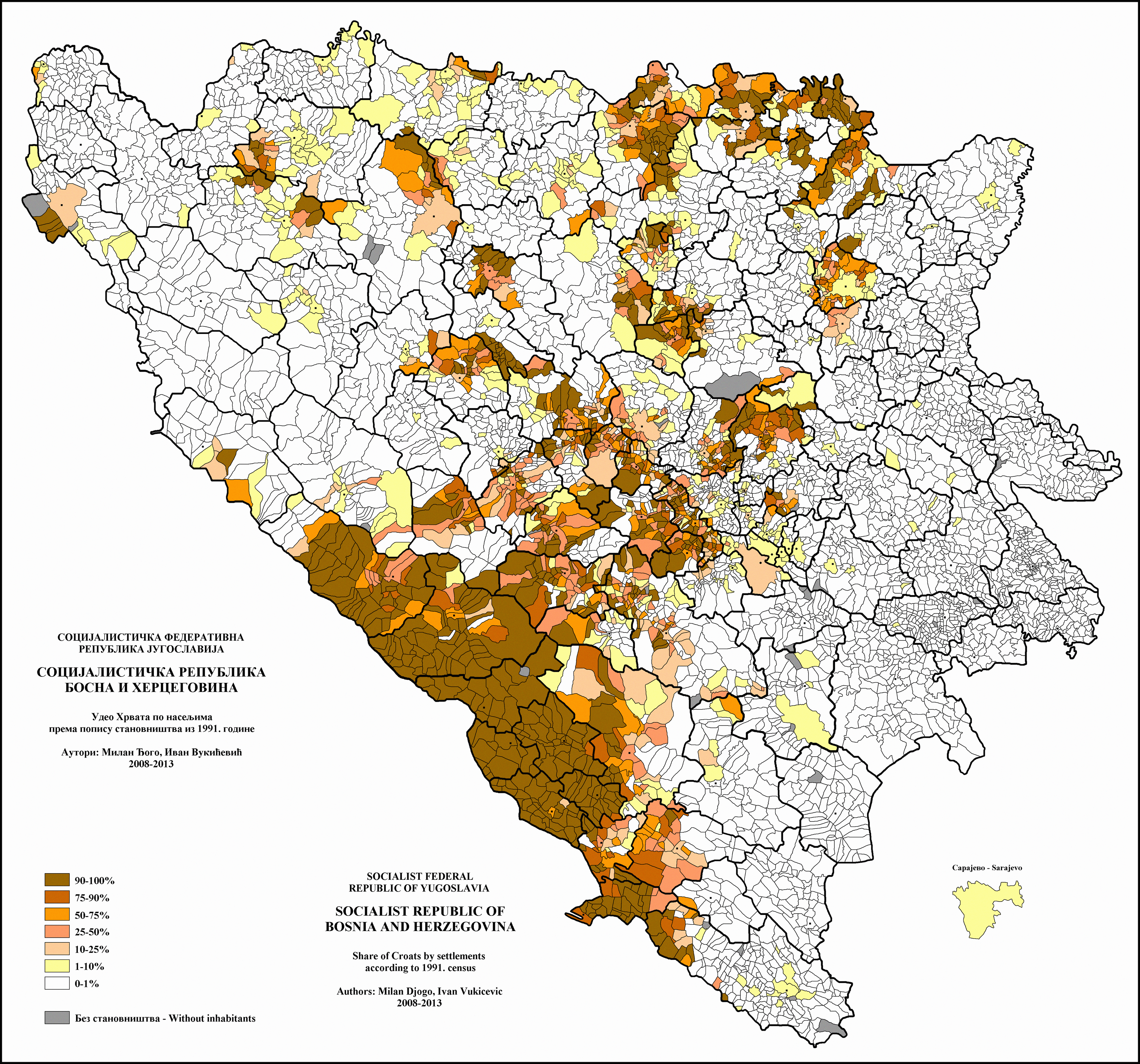
The share of Croats in Bosnia and Herzegovina in 1991

In early 1991, following the 14th Extraordinary Congress of the Communist Party of Yugoslavia, the leaders of the six Yugoslav republics began a series of meetings to solve the crisis in Yugoslavia. The Serbian leadership favored the centralisation of the country, whereas the Croatian and Slovenian leadership favored a confederation of sovereign states or federalization. Alija Izetbegović proposed an asymmetrical federation on 22 February, where Slovenia and Croatia would maintain loose ties with the four remaining republics. Shortly after that, he changed his position and opted for a sovereign Bosnia and Herzegovina as a prerequisite for such a federation. On 25 March 1991, Croatian president Franjo Tuđman met with Serbian president Slobodan Milošević in Karađorđevo, allegedly to discuss the partition of Bosnia and Herzegovina. On 6 June, Izetbegović and Macedonian president Kiro Gligorov proposed a weak confederation between Croatia, Slovenia and a federation of the other four republics, which was rejected by Milošević.

On 13 July, the government of Netherlands, then the presiding EC country, suggested to other EC countries that the possibility of agreed changes to Yugoslav Republics borders could be explored, but the proposal was rejected by other members. In July 1991, Radovan Karadžić, president of the self-proclaimed Republika Srpska, and Muhamed Filipović, vice president of the Muslim Bosniak Organisation (MBO), drafted an agreement between the Serbs and Bosniaks which would leave Bosnia in a state union with SR Serbia and SR Montenegro. The Croatian Democratic Union (HDZ BiH) and the Social Democratic Party (SDP BiH) denounced the agreement, calling it an anti-Croat pact and a betrayal. Although initially welcoming the initiative, Izetbegović also dismissed the agreement.

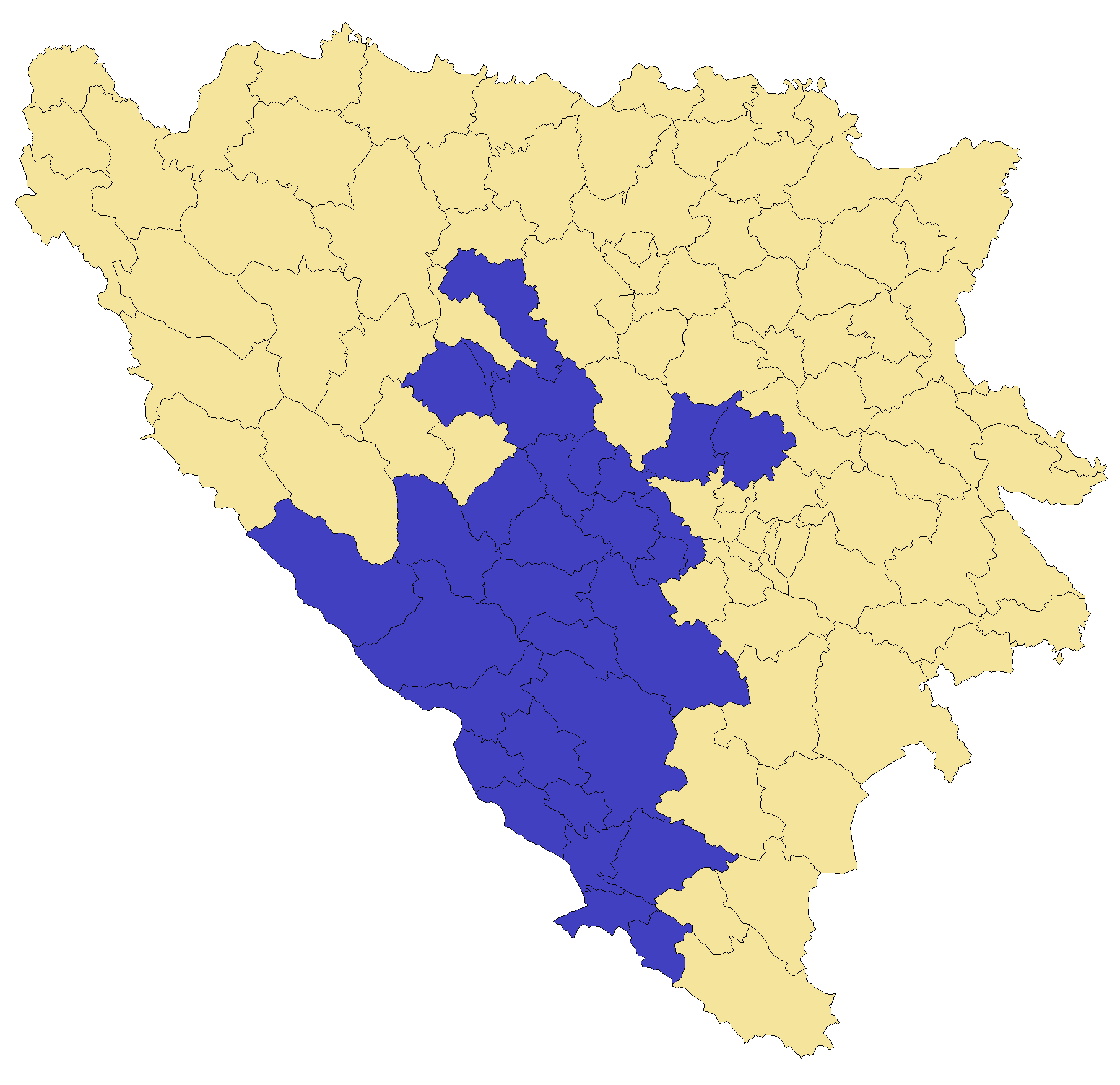
30 municipalities declared part of the Croatian Community of Herzeg-Bosnia in 1991

From July 1991 to January 1992, during the Croatian War of Independence, the Yugoslav People's Army (JNA) and Serb paramilitaries used Bosnian territory to wage attacks on Croatia. The Croatian government helped arm the Croats and Bosniaks in Bosnia and Herzegovina, expecting the war to spread there. By late 1991 about 20,000 Croats in Bosnia and Herzegovina, mostly from the Herzegovina region, enlisted in the Croatian National Guard. During the war in Croatia, Bosnian president Izetbegović gave a televised proclamation of neutrality, stating that "this is not our war", and the Sarajevo government was not taking defensive measures against a probable attack by the Bosnian Serbs and the JNA. Izetbegović agreed to disarm the existing Territorial Defense (TO) forces on the demand of the JNA. This was defied by Bosnian Croats and Bosniak organizations that gained control of many facilities and weapons of the TO.

== History ==
The Croatian Democratic Union became a general people's movement in the early 1990s

=== Establishment ===
In October 1991 the Croat village of Ravno in Herzegovina was attacked and destroyed by JNA forces before turning south towards the besieged Dubrovnik. These were the first Croat casualties in Bosnia and Herzegovina. Izetbegović did not react to the attack on Ravno. The leadership of Bosnia and Herzegovina initially showed a willingness to remain in a rump Yugoslavia but later advocated for a unified Bosnia and Herzegovina.

On 12 November 1991, at a meeting chaired by Dario Kordić and Mate Boban, local party leaders of the HDZ BiH reached an agreement to undertake a policy of achieving an "age-old dream, a common Croatian State" and decided that the proclamation of a Croatian banovina in Bosnia and Herzegovina should be the "initial phase leading towards the final solution of the Croatian question and the creation of a sovereign Croatia within its ethnic and historical [...] borders." On the same day, the Croatian Community of Bosnian Posavina was proclaimed in municipalities of northwest Bosnia in Bosanski Brod.

On 18 November, the autonomous Croatian Community of Herzeg-Bosnia (HZ-HB) was established, it claimed it had no secession goal and that it would serve a "legal basis for local self-administration". The decision on its establishment stated that the Community will "respect the democratically elected government of the Republic of Bosnia and Herzegovina for as long as exists the state independence of Bosnia and Herzegovina in relation to the former, or any other, Yugoslavia". Boban was established as its president. One of Boban's advisers stated that Herzeg-Bosnia was only a temporary measure and that the entire area would in the end be an integral part of Bosnia and Herzegovina. From its inception the leadership of Herzeg-Bosnia and Croatian Defence Council (HVO) held close relations to the Croatian government and the Croatian Army (HV). At a session of the Supreme State Council of Croatia, Tuđman said that the establishment of Herzeg-Bosnia was not a decision to separate from Bosnia and Herzegovina. On 23 November, the Bosnian government declared Herzeg-Bosnia unlawful.

On 27 December 1991, the leadership of the HDZ of Croatia and of HDZ BiH held a meeting in Zagreb chaired by Tuđman. They discussed Bosnia and Herzegovina's future, their differences in opinion on it, and the creation of a Croatian political strategy. Stjepan Kljuić favored that Croats stay within Bosnia and Herzegovina while Boban said that, in the event of Bosnia and Herzegovina's disintegration, Herzeg-Bosnia should be proclaimed an independent Croatian territory "which will accede to the State of Croatia but only at such time as the Croatian leadership [...] should decide." Kordić, the vice president of Herzeg-Bosnia, claimed that the spirit of Croats in Herzeg-Bosnia had grown stronger since its declaration and that Croats in the Travnik region were prepared to become a part of the Croatian State "at all costs [...] any other option would be considered treason, save the clear demarcation of Croatian soil in the territory of Herzeg-Bosnia." At the same meeting, Tuđman said that "from the perspective of sovereignty, Bosnia-Herzegovina has no prospects" and recommended that Croatian policy should be one of "support for the sovereignty [of Bosnia and Herzegovina] until such time as it no longer suits Croatia." He based this on the belief that the Serbs did not accept Bosnia and Herzegovina and that Bosnian representatives did not believe in it and wished to remain in Yugoslavia, and thought that such a policy would avoid war. Tuđman declared "it is time that we take the opportunity to gather the Croatian people inside the widest possible borders".

=== Bosnian War ===
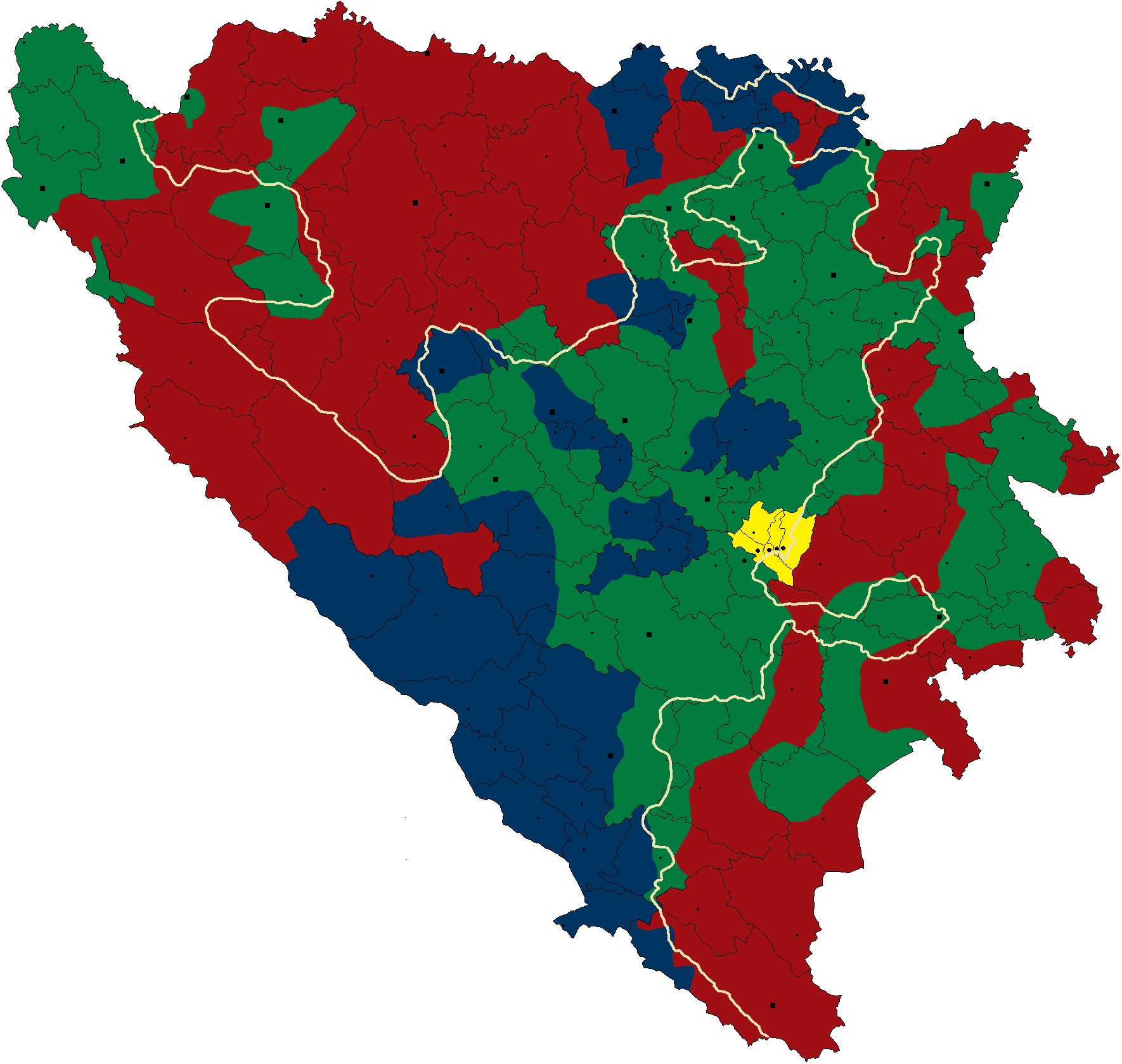
Carrington-Cutileiro plan, proposed in early 1992 Bosniak cantons Serb cantons Croat cantons

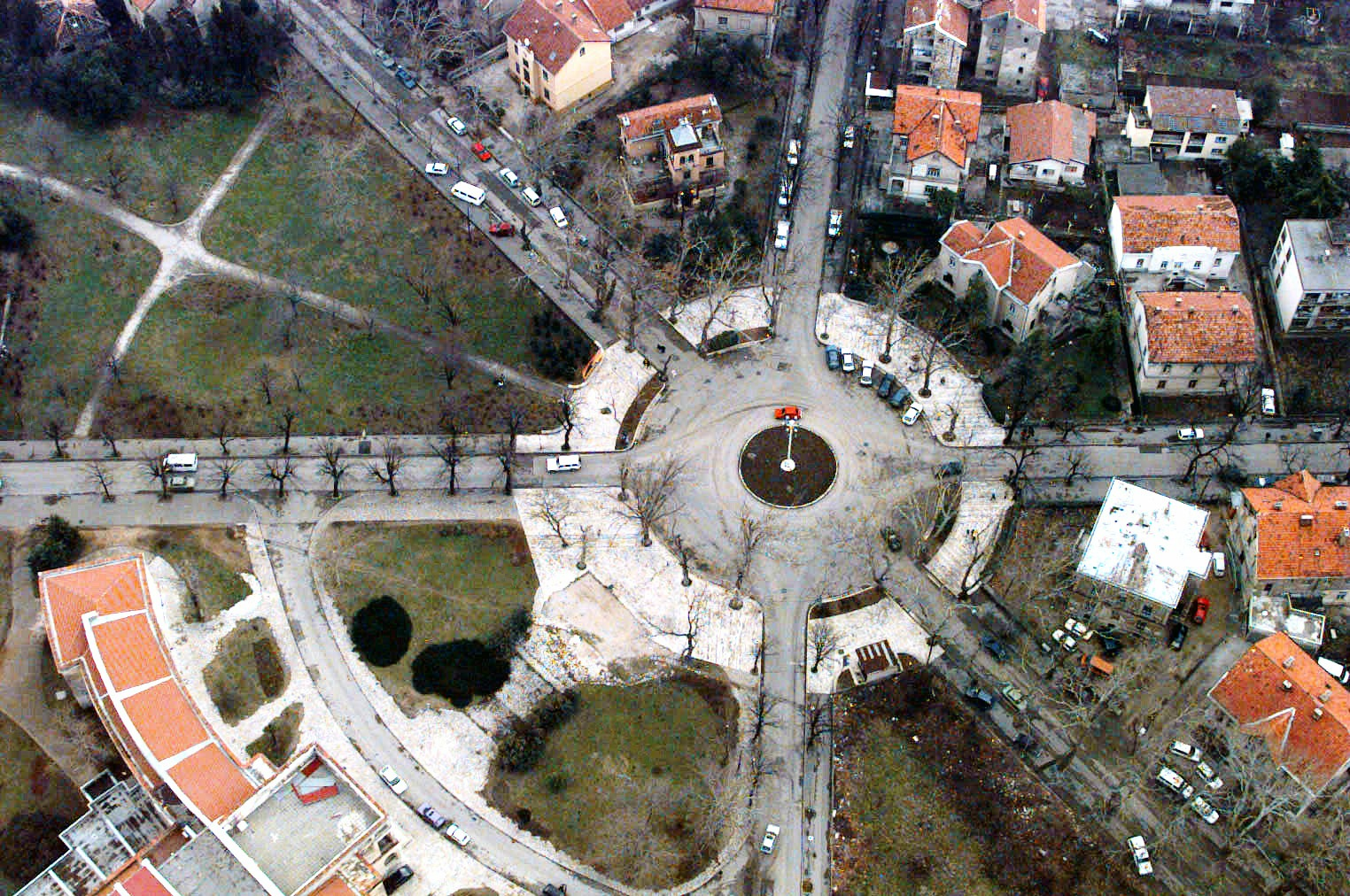
Aerial photograph of Croatian Nobles Square in Mostar after the war, where the Government of Herzeg-Bosnia was located

Between 29 February and 1 March 1992, an independence referendum was held in SR Bosnia and Herzegovina. The referendum question was: "Are you in favor of a sovereign and independent Bosnia-Herzegovina, a state of equal citizens and nations of Muslims, Serbs, Croats and others who live in it?" Independence was strongly favoured by Bosniak and Bosnian Croat voters, but the referendum was largely boycotted by Bosnian Serbs. The total turnout of voters was 63.6%, of which 99.7% voted for the independence of Bosnia and Herzegovina.

On 8 April 1992, the HVO was formed and was the official military of Herzeg-Bosnia. A sizable number of Bosniaks also joined the HVO, constituting between 20 and 30 percent of the army. The legal rationale for the formation of HVO was seen in the laws of Yugoslavia that allowed citizens to organize their own self-defence when their government was unable or unwilling to defend them. Boban said that the HVO was formed because "thirteen Croatian villages in the municipality of Trebinje – including Ravno – were destroyed and the Bosnian government did nothing thereafter".

At the beginning of the war, a Croat-Bosniak alliance was formed, but over time there were notable breakdowns of it due to rising tensions and the lack of mutual trust, with each of the two sides holding separate discussions with the Serbs, and soon there were complaints from both sides against the other. The designated capital of Herzeg-Bosnia, Mostar, was besieged by the JNA and later the Army of Republika Srpska (VRS) from April 1992. In late May, the HVO launched a counter-offensive and, after more than a month of fighting, managed to suppress the VRS forces from Mostar and the surrounding area.

The Croatian and Herzeg-Bosnia leadership offered Izetbegović a confederation of Croatia and Bosnia and Herzegovina, but Izetbegović rejected it. On 3 July 1992, the Croatian Community of Herzeg-Bosnia was formally declared, in an amendment to the original decision from November 1991. It adopted the Croatian dinar as its currency and Croatian as the official language. It had its own school curriculum and a local government system. In the preamble it was attested:

"Faced with the ruthless aggression of the Yugoslav Army and Chetniks against the Republic of Bosnia and Herzegovina and the Republic of Croatia, with the tremendous number of lives lost, with the suffering and pain, with the fact that age-old Croatian territories and goods are being coveted, with the destruction of the Republic of Bosnia and Herzegovina and its legally elected bodies, the Croatian people of Bosnia and Herzegovina, in these difficult moments of their history when the last Communist army of Europe, united with the Chetniks, is endangering the existence of the Croatian people and the Republic of Bosnia and Herzegovina, are deeply aware that their future lies with the future of the entire Croatian people."

On 21 July 1992, the Agreement on Friendship and Cooperation between Bosnia and Herzegovina and Croatia was signed by Izetbegović and Tuđman, establishing a military cooperation between Bosnian and Croatian forces. Although it was often not harmonious, it resulted in the gradual stabilisation of the defence in Bosnia and Herzegovina. Weapons for the Bosnian army were sent through Croatia despite the arms embargo. At a session held on 6 August, the Bosnian Presidency accepted HVO as an integral part of the Army of the Republic of Bosnia and Herzegovina (ARBiH).

On 14 September 1992, the Constitutional Court of Bosnia and Herzegovina declared the proclamation of Herzeg-Bosnia unconstitutional. The Croatian Community of Bosnian Posavina was formally joined into Herzeg-Bosnia in October 1992. Throughout late 1992, tensions between Croats and Bosniaks increased and in early 1993 the Croat–Bosniak War escalated. Clashes spread in central Bosnia, particularly in the Lašva Valley. Within two months most of central Bosnia was under ARBiH control.

In late July 1993 the Owen-Stoltenberg Plan was proposed by U.N. mediators Thorvald Stoltenberg and David Owen that would organize Bosnia and Herzegovina into a union of three ethnic republics. Serbs would receive 53 percent of the territory, Bosniaks would receive 30 percent, and Croats 17 percent. The Croats accepted the proposal, although they had some objections regarding the proposed borders. The Serbs also accepted the proposal, while the Bosniak side rejected the plan, demanding territories in eastern and western Bosnia from the Serbs and access to the Adriatic Sea from the Croats. On 28 August, in accordance with the Owen-Stoltenberg peace proposal, the Croatian Republic of Herzeg-Bosnia was proclaimed in Grude as a "republic of the Croats in Bosnia and Herzegovina". However, it was not recognised by the Bosnian government.

=== Washington Agreement ===
On 26 February 1994 talks began in Washington, D.C. between the Bosnian government leaders and Mate Granić, Croatian Minister of Foreign Affairs to discuss the possibilities of a permanent ceasefire and a confederation of Bosniak and Croat regions. By this time the amount of territory of Bosnia and Herzegovina controlled by the HVO had dropped from 16 percent to 13 percent. Boban and HVO hardliners and war criminals were removed from power while "criminal elements" were dismissed from the ARBiH. Under strong American pressure, a provisional agreement on a Croat-Bosniak Federation was reached in Washington on 1 March. On 18 March, at a ceremony hosted by US President Bill Clinton, Bosnian Prime Minister Haris Silajdžić, Croatian Foreign Minister Mate Granić and President of Herzeg-Bosnia Krešimir Zubak signed the ceasefire agreement. The agreement was also signed by Izetbegović and Tuđman. Under this agreement, the combined territory held by the Croat and Bosnian government forces was divided into ten autonomous cantons. It effectively ended the Croat-Bosniak War.

=== Aftermath ===
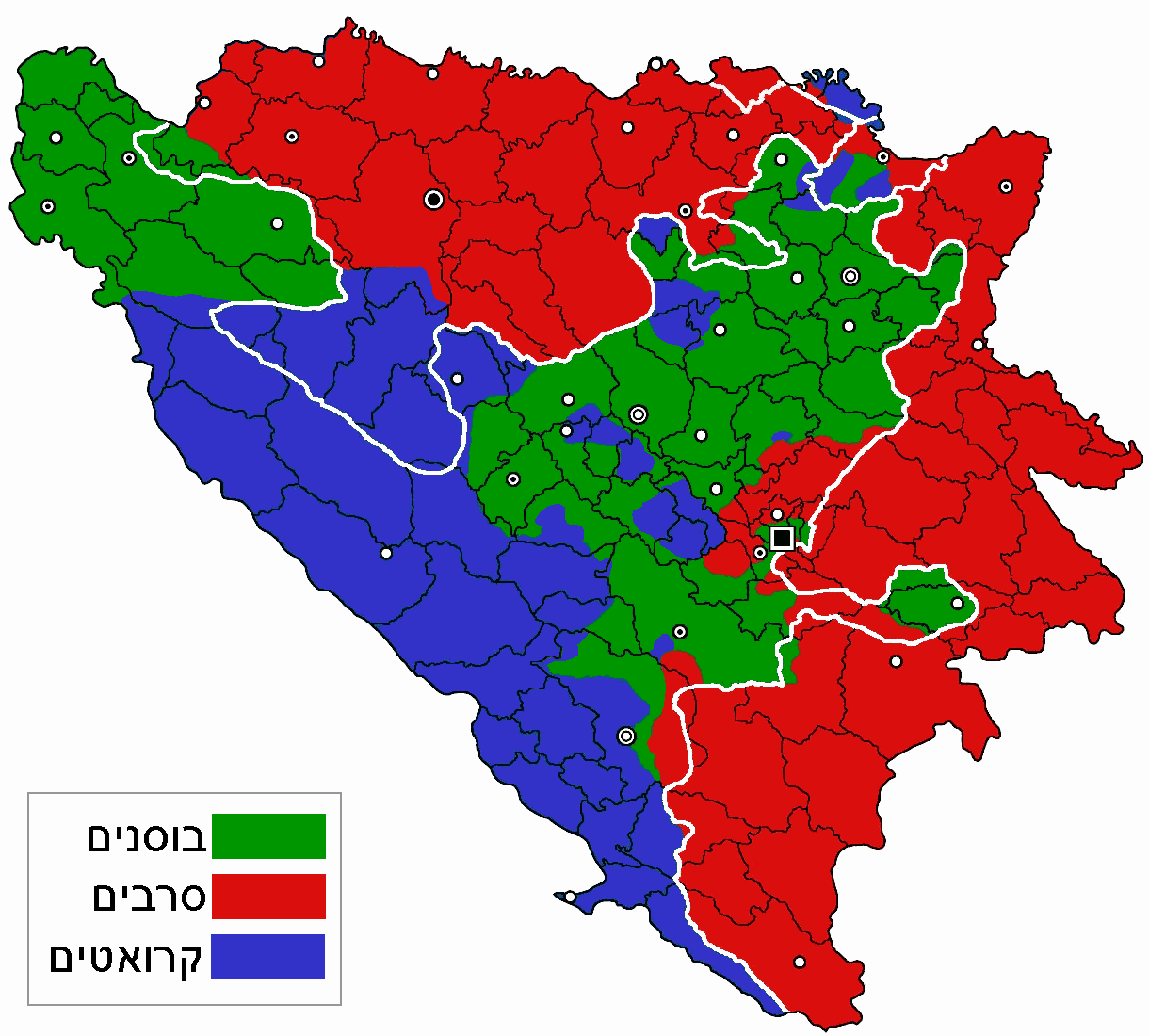
BiH territory controlled just before Dayton Agreement in 1995. HVO (Croatian Defence Council) ARBiH (Army of Bosnia-Herzegovina) VRS (Republika Srpska)

In November 1995 the Dayton Agreement was signed by presidents of Croatia, Bosnia and Herzegovina and Serbia that ended the Bosnian war. The Federation of Bosnia and Herzegovina (FBiH) was defined as one of the two entities of Bosnia and Herzegovina and comprised 51% of the territory. The Republic of Srpska (RS) comprised the other 49%. However, there were problems with its implementation due to different interpretations of the agreement. An Army of the Federation of Bosnia and Herzegovina was to be created by merging units from the ARBiH and the HVO, though this process was largely ineffective. The Federation was divided into 10 cantons. Croats were a majority in three of them and Bosniaks in five. Two cantons were ethnically mixed, and in municipalities that were divided during the war parallel local administrations remained. The return of refugees was to begin in those cantons. The agreement stipulated that Herzeg-Bosnia be abolished within two weeks.

The Federation acted only on paper and failed to function as a working government, despite the pressure from Washington and with presidents Tuđman and Izetbegović assuring that Croat and Bosniak politicians would join in the new government. On 14 August 1996, it was agreed that Herzeg-Bosnia would be formally abolished by the end of that month. On 24 May 1997, the Croatian Community of Herzeg-Bosnia association was founded in Neum as the main institution of Croats in the country.

According to a 1999 report by the European Stability Initiative (ESI), Herzeg-Bosnia structures continued to function and a parallel government acted to expand the independence of its financial institutions. HDZ leaders claimed that "the Herzeg-Bosnia side could not accept a common financial system, because such a system did not allow the Bosnian Croats to finance their own army and to follow up on their own social obligations in the long term." Parallel Herzeg-Bosnia budgetary systems collect revenue from Croat-controlled cantons. The Herzeg-Bosnia Payments Bureau controls Croat economic activity and there are separate Croat public utilities, social services, social insurance funds, and forestry administrations. A segregated education system with a Herzeg-Bosnia curriculum and textbooks from Croatia is maintained. According to the ESI report, Herzeg-Bosnia continued receiving financial support from Croatia, particularly the Ministry of Defence. The pension and education systems and the salaries of Croat politicians and military officers are subsidized by the Croatian government. An Organization for Security and Co-operation in Europe (OSCE) report two years after the end of the war concluded that Herzeg-Bosnia became "in every respect, from military and security matters to business ties, part of Croatia."

== Area and population ==
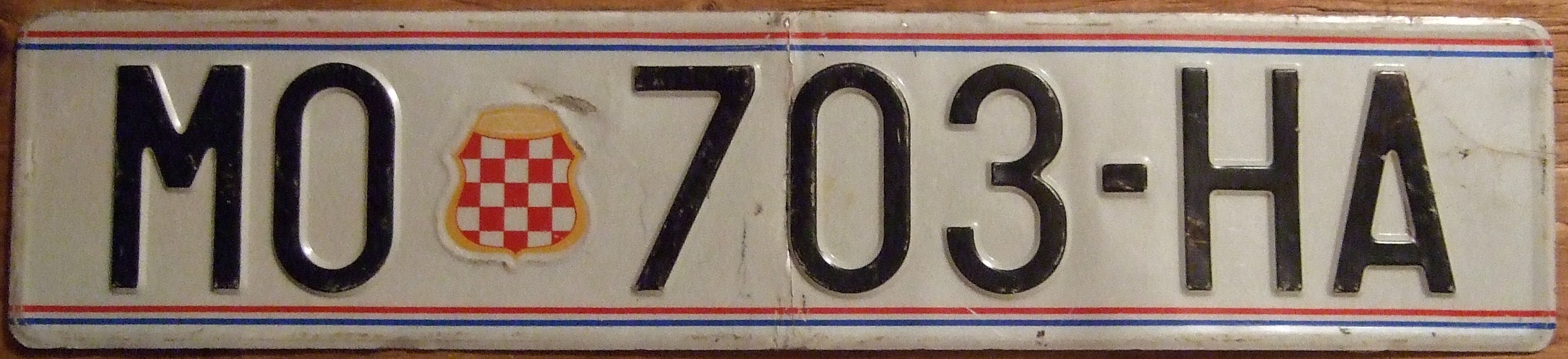
License plate of Mostar with the Coat of arms of Herzeg-Bosnia

The Croatian Communities of Bosnian Posavina and Herzeg-Bosnia within its proclaimed borders in November 1991 extended at about 30% of Bosnia and Herzegovina. According to the 1991 census, in that territory, there were 1,238,512 people with ethnicities as follows.

- Croats – 556,274 (44.91%)
- Muslims – 398,092 (32.14%)
- Serbs – 203,612 (16.44%)
- Yugoslavs – 56,092 (4.53%)
- Others – 24,505 (1.98%)

During the initial negotiations organized by the international community, the Croatian side advocated for a Croat national unit at some 30% of Bosnia and Herzegovina – slightly altered borders of the Croatian Communities, but with Croat enclaves around Žepče, Banja Luka and Prijedor included.

This maximalist approach was done for a better position during negotiations, which would inevitably reduce the excessive demands to an optimal envision of a Croat unit. Based on later statements of Herzeg-Bosnia leading officials, the optimal range of a Croat territorial unit was within the borders of the 1939 Banovina of Croatia, thus excluding Bosniak and Serb majority areas on the outskirts of Herzeg-Bosnia. Those borders would include around 26% of Bosnia and Herzegovina. The ethnic composition of this area in 1991 was:

- Croats – 514,228 (50.94%)
- Muslims – 291,232 (28.85%)
- Serbs – 141,805 (14.05%)
- Yugoslavs – 44,043 (4.36%)
- Others – 18,191 (1.80%)

At the beginning of the war, JNA and VRS forces gained control of Serb-majority areas that were proclaimed part of Herzeg-Bosnia. By late 1992 Herzeg-Bosnia lost Kupres, most of Bosnian Posavina, and Jajce to VRS. The territory under the authority of Herzeg-Bosnia became limited to Croat ethnic areas in around 16% of Bosnia and Herzegovina. The arrival of Bosniak refugees from areas captured by the VRS to HVO-controlled parts of central Bosnia and Mostar altered the ethnic structure and reduced the share of Croats.

== Economy ==
In the late 1980s and early 1990s, Bosnia and Herzegovina was among the less-developed republics of SFR Yugoslavia, alongside Macedonia and Montenegro, while Kosovo was the poorest federal unit overall. However, Bosnia also had a significant industrial base, especially in mining, metallurgy, energy, machinery and military-related production. Its problem was lower income, uneven development and weaker infrastructure compared with Slovenia, Croatia and Serbia proper, not absence of industry.

The economy of Bosnia and Herzegovina totally faded during the Bosnian War. Many companies, which were successful before the war, were robbed and destroyed just at the beginning of the war. There was no economic activity due to the Yugoslav wars. Agricultural output was diminished, the traffic infrastructure was in collapse, construction was almost non-existent, and unemployment was very high. As a result of the wars, between 1992 and 1995, industrial production declined by 80% and an already poor infrastructure declined further. Croats left the war the most prosperous. Former Yugoslav companies were left without headquarters which were located on the territory of Herzeg-Bosnia. All banks were based in Sarajevo.

Herzeg-Bosnia did not have a central bank. Credits were obtained from local commercial banks, meaning that the deficit was financed by the real sector and the households sector. Foreign banking branches had to legally close their operations and reregister as new banks in Bosnia and Herzegovina after it declared independence. The most important bank in Herzeg-Bosnia was Hrvatska banka d.d. Mostar. The second largest bank was Hrvatska poštanska banka. The official currency in the territory of Herzeg-Bosnia was the Bosnia and Herzegovina dinar, but two parallel currencies were also in use: the Deutsche Mark and the Croatian dinar (later the Croatian kuna).

Reconstruction in most of Herzeg-Bosnia resumed shortly after the Washington Agreement was signed. Civilian employment in Herzeg-Bosnia in 1994 was around 20% of its pre-war level. In 1995, the industrial production growth rate in Croat-majority areas was 25%, average wages grew by 35%, and employment growth was 69%. The highest growth was recorded in the production of concrete. The average monthly wage was 250 DEM and each employee received a monthly food supplement of 50 DEM. Unemployment was estimated at 50% of the total labor force in mid-1995. GDP growth in the Federation of Bosnia and Herzegovina was estimated at 28% in 1995, fueled by the renewal of the Croat-Bosniak alliance, while GDP in Republic of Srpska declined by 23%.

== Military ==
Flag of the Croatian Defence Council (HVO)

Police of the Croatian Republic of Herzeg-Bosnia

The Croatian Defence Council (Croatian: Hrvatsko vijeće obrane, HVO) was formed on 8 April 1992 and was the official military of Herzeg-Bosnia, although the organization and arming of Bosnian Croat military forces began in late 1991. Each district of Herzeg-Bosnia was responsible for its own defence until the formation of four Operative Zones with headquarters in Mostar, Tomislavgrad, Vitez and Orašje. However, there were always problems in coordinating the Operative Zones. On 15 May 1992, the HVO Department of Defense was established. By that time the HVO Main Staff, Main Logistics Base, Military Police, and Personnel Administration were also formed. The backbone of the HVO were its brigades formed in late 1992 and early 1993. Their organization and military equipment was relatively good, but could only conduct limited and local offensive action. The brigades usually had three or four subordinate infantry battalions with light artillery, mortars, antitank and support platoons. A brigade numbered between a few hundred to several thousand men, but most had 2–3,000. In early 1993 the HVO Home Guard was formed in order to provide support for the brigades. The HVO forces became better organized as time passed by, but they started creating guards brigades, mobile units of professional soldiers, only in early 1994. The European Community Monitoring Mission (ECMM) estimated the strength of the HVO in the beginning of 1993 at 45,000–55,000. In July 1993, CIA estimated the HVO forces at 40,000 to 50,000 men.

== Culture ==
The Government of Herzeg-Bosnia (Croatian: Vlada Herceg-Bosne) founded the National Theatre in 1993 in Mostar. From 1994 it had the title of Croatian National Theatre in Mostar and was the first one with the prefix Croatian. The first play performed in this theatre was A Christmas Fable (Croatian: Božićna bajka) by Mate Matišić. The foundations of a new building were laid in January 1996.

== Education ==
The Ministry of Education of Herzeg-Bosnia adopted Croatian as the official language and followed the education programme of Croatian schools. As the war escalated, teaching in schools and the University of Mostar was suspended in May 1993 for the remainder of the academic year. The Faculty of Pedagogy of the University of Mostar, located in western Mostar, temporarily moved its facilities to the towns of Široki Brijeg and Neum where there were no major armed conflicts. It returned to Mostar in 1994.

== Sport ==
Organized football competitions in Bosnia and Herzegovina were cancelled in 1992 due to the war. The First League of Herzeg-Bosnia as the top football league started on 20 April 1994 and was divided into two groups. The League was organized by the Football Federation of Herzeg Bosnia. The winner of the first season, that was played only in Spring, was NK Mladost-Dubint Široki Brijeg. The league was played for seven years, with NK Široki Brijeg winning five and NK Posušje two trophies.

== Legacy ==
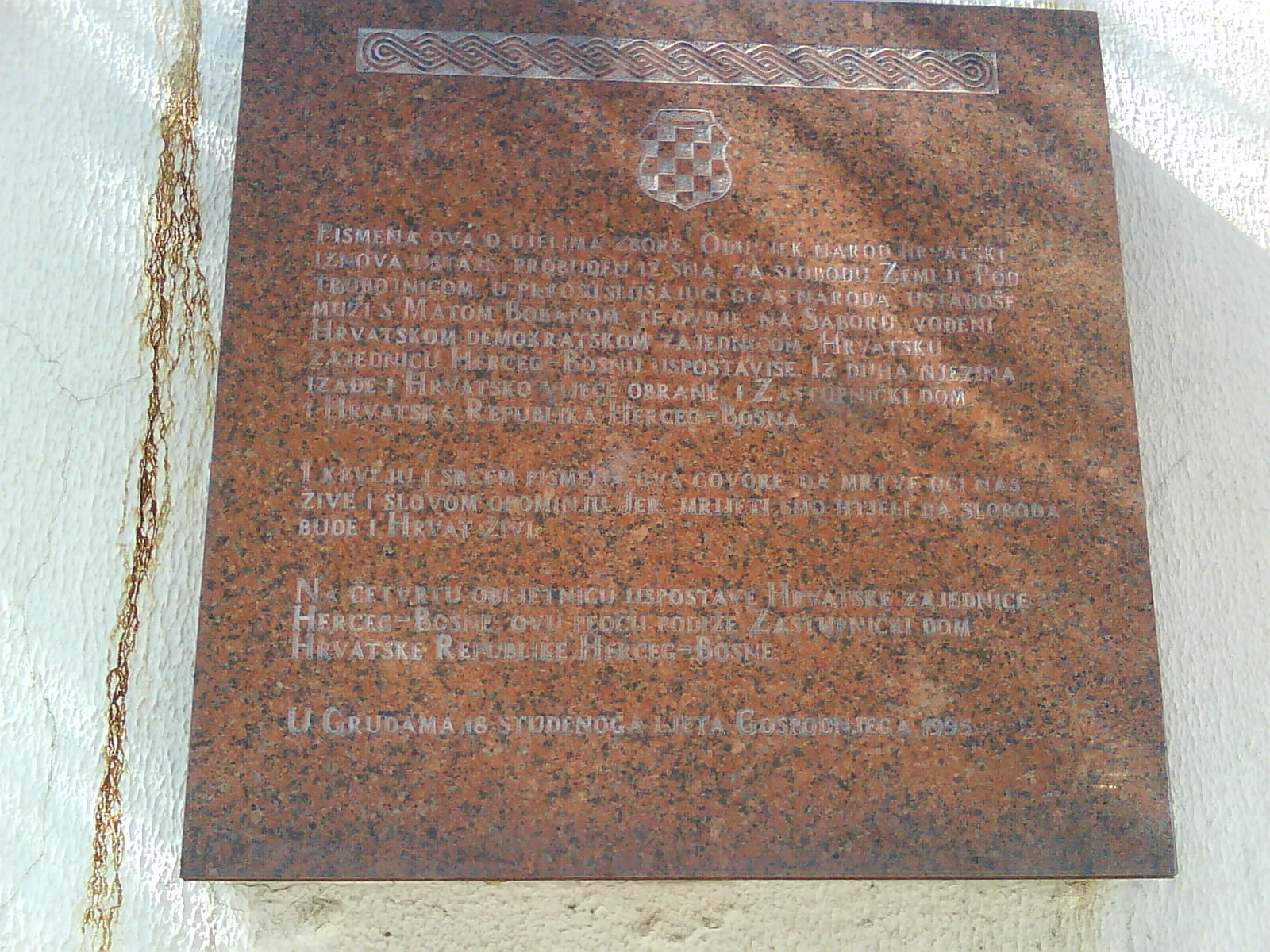
Memorial plaque in Grude, made as a tribute to Mate Boban and leaders of Herzeg-Bosnia

Since 2005, there have been attempts to restore Herzeg-Bosnia by creating a new third entity in Bosnia and Herzegovina. This was started under the leadership of Ivo Miro Jović, as he said "I don't mean to reproach Bosnian Serbs, but if they have a Serb republic, then we should also create a Croat republic and Bosniak (Muslim) republic". The Croat representative on the federal Bosnian Presidency, Željko Komšić, opposed this, but some Bosnian Croat politicians advocated for the establishment of a third (Croatian) entity.

Dragan Čović, president of one of the main Croatian parties in Bosnia, Croatian Democratic Union of Bosnia and Herzegovina (HDZ BiH), said that "all Croatian parties will propose that Bosnia and Herzegovina be divided into three ethnic entities, with Sarajevo as a separate district. Croatian politicians must be the initiators of a new constitution which would guarantee Croats the same rights as to other constituent peoples. Every federal unit would have its legislative, executive and judiciary organs". He claimed the two-entity system is untenable and that Croats have been subject to assimilation and deprived of basic rights in the federation with Bosniaks.

Petar Matanović, president of the Croatian National Council, opposed creating a third entity, claiming that the division of Bosnia into four federal units (three proposed ethnically based entities plus Sarajevo as a neutral capital entity) would lead to a new war. He added that "we have to establish the state of Bosnia-Herzegovina in accordance with European standards and then regulate entities. It seems to me that this agreement entails an intention to strengthen entities and weaken the country." Stjepan Mesić, former president of Croatia, opposed the creation of a third entity, stating that: "if the current division of Bosnia Herzegovina into two entities does not function, it will not function with divisions into three entities".

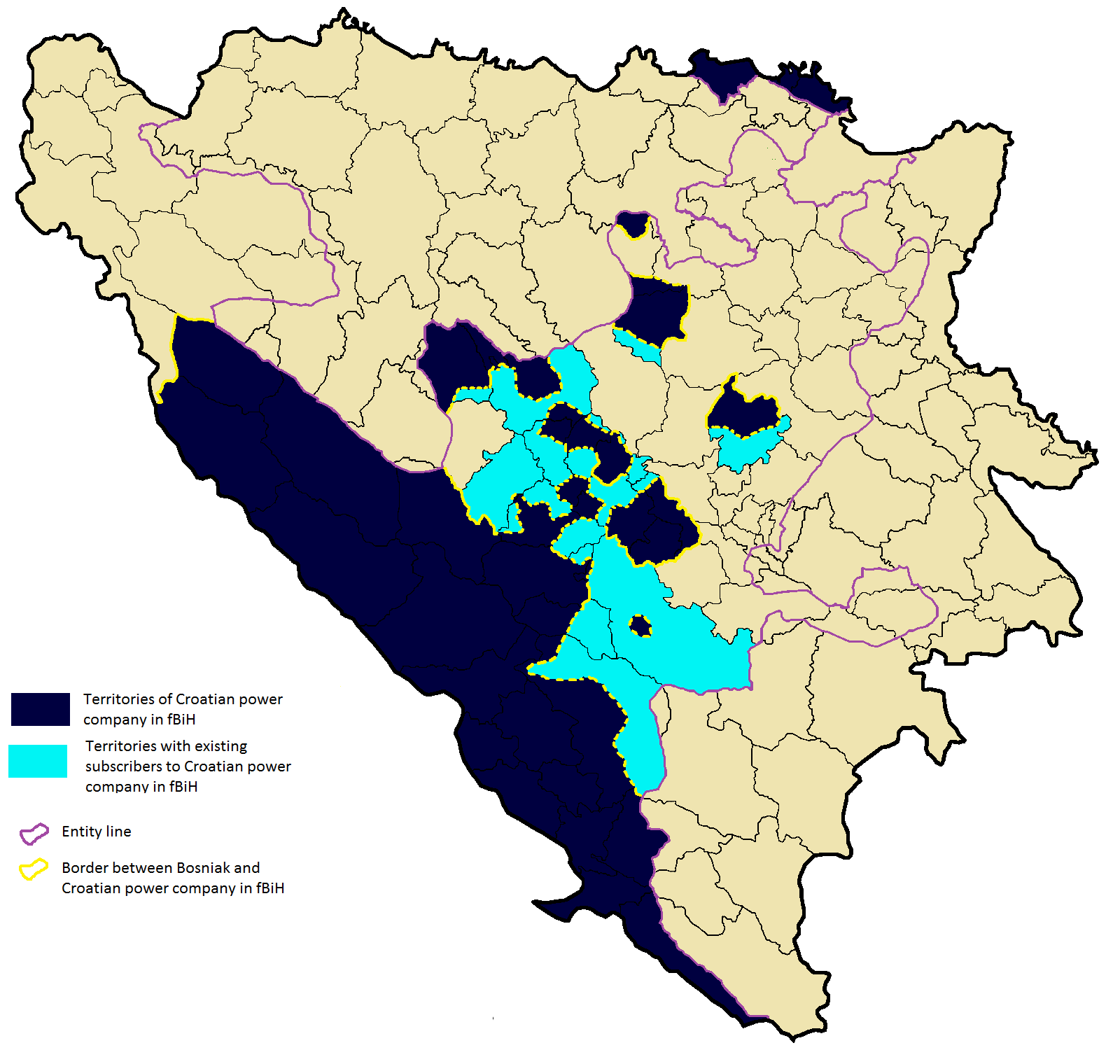
Operation area of the utility company of Croatian Community of Herzeg-Bosnia, "Elektroprivreda HZ HB", roughly corresponding with the area of Herzeg-Bosnia political and institutional control in 1995–97, has been proposed by International Crisis Group and Croatian Peasant Party as the tentative area of Croat entity.

In 2009, Miroslav Tuđman, son of the late Franjo Tuđman, called for the establishment of a Croatian entity. Čović stated, "We want to live in Bosnia-Herzegovina where Croats will be equal to the other two peoples according to the Constitution."

In 2013, six political and military leaders of Herzeg-Bosnia, Jadranko Prlić, Bruno Stojić, Slobodan Praljak, Milivoj Petković, Valentin Ćorić, and Berislav Pušić, were convicted in a first instance verdict by the ICTY for being part of a joint criminal enterprise (JCE) against the non-Croat population of Bosnia and Herzegovina. The ICTY also ruled, by a majority, that Tuđman, Šušak and Boban were part of a JCE, whose goal was to annex or control territory that was part of the Banovina of Croatia in 1939. Judge Jean-Claude Antonetti, the presiding judge in the trial, issued a separate opinion in which he contested the notion of a joint criminal enterprise.

Slobodan Praljak and others (Prlić, Stojić, Petković, Ćorić and Pušić) were found guilty of committing violations of the laws of war, crimes against humanity and breaches of the Geneva Conventions during the Croat–Bosniak War by the International Criminal Tribunal for the former Yugoslavia (ICTY) in November 2017.

In February 2017, Croatian Peasant Party of Bosnia and Herzegovina's president Mario Karamatić said his party will demand a reestablishment of Croatian Republic of Herzeg-Bosnia in its 1995 shape if the Republika Srpska secedes. Karamatić declared Croats have been "fooled" by the 1994 Washington Agreement that abolished Herzeg-Bosnia and established the Croat-Bosniak Federation, which was also "broken" numerous times and that Croats have the right to recede to the status quo ante, i.e., Herzeg-Bosnia. As far as the Herzeg-Bosnia's tentative territory, Karamatić proposed the area served by the electricity utility Elektroprivreda HZ HB, which covers most areas of Croat habitation.

18 November is celebrated as the holiday in West Herzegovina Canton as the day of Herzeg-Bosnia's foundation. One of the cantons of the Federation used the name "Herzeg-Bosnian Canton", but this name was deemed unconstitutional by the Federation Constitutional Court, and it is officially referred to as Canton 10. A memorial plaque in honor of Herzeg-Bosnia and Mate Boban was placed in downtown Grude.

== See also ==
- Croatian Defence Forces
