= Gorica, Grude =

Village in Grude, Bosnia and Herzegovina

Gorica
- Village
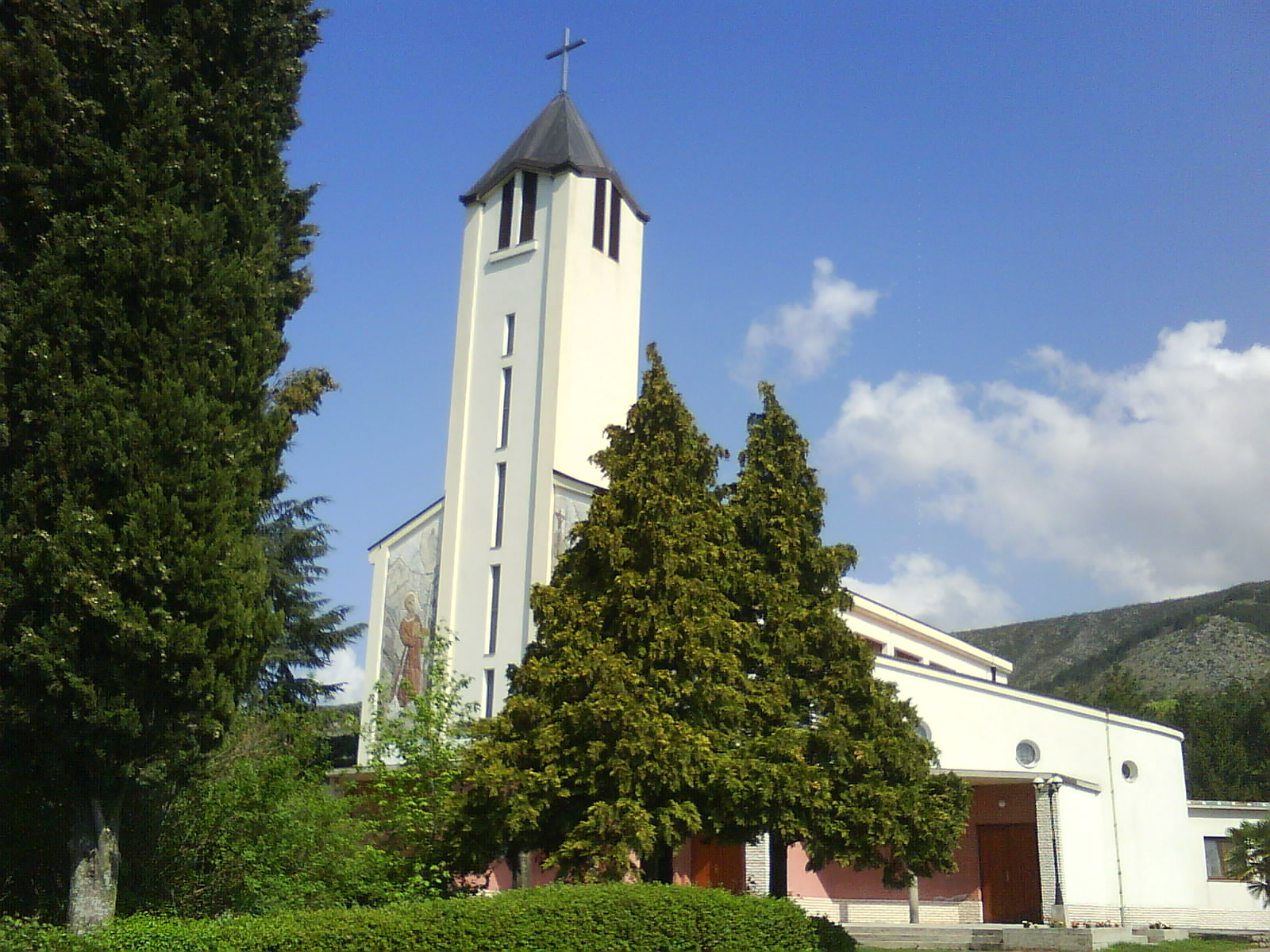

- Location within Bosnia and Herzegovina
- Coordinates: 43°25′06″N 17°17′06″E
- Country: Bosnia and Herzegovina
- Entity: Federation of Bosnia and Herzegovina
- Canton: West Herzegovina
- Municipality: Grude

Area
  - Total: 4.63 sq mi (12.00 km^{2})

Population (2013)
  - Total: 1,123
  - Density: 242.4/sq mi (93.58/km^{2})
- Time zone: UTC+1 (CET)
  - Summer (DST): UTC+2 (CEST)

Gorica is a village in Bosnia and Herzegovina. According to the 1991 census, the village is located in the municipality of Grude.

== Demographics ==
According to the 2013 census, its population was 1,123.

Ethnicity in 2013
Ethnicity	Number	Percentage
Croats	1,117	99.5%
other/undeclared	6	0.5%
Total	1,123	100%
