= Grude =

- Town and municipality
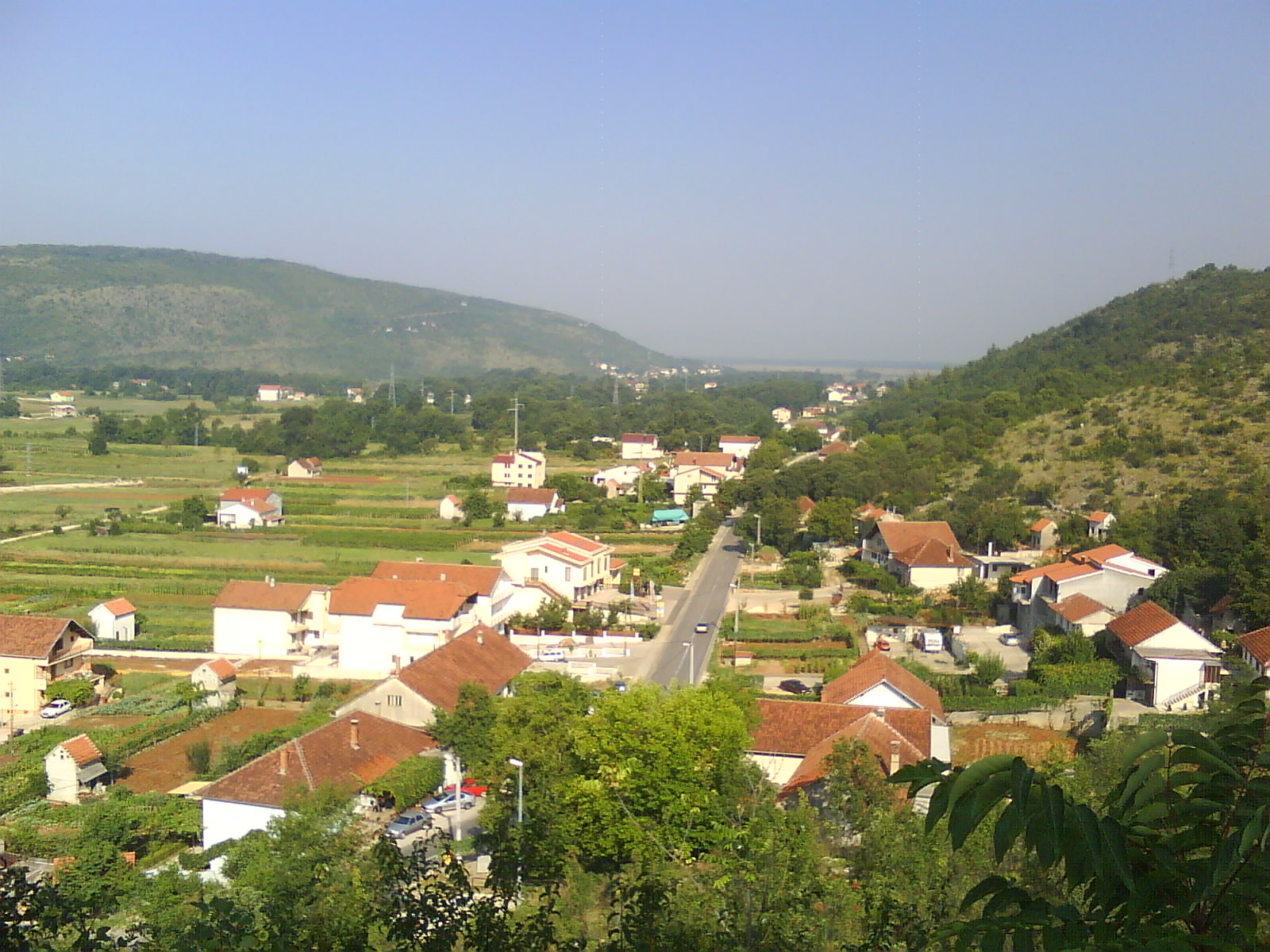
- Panoramic view of Grude

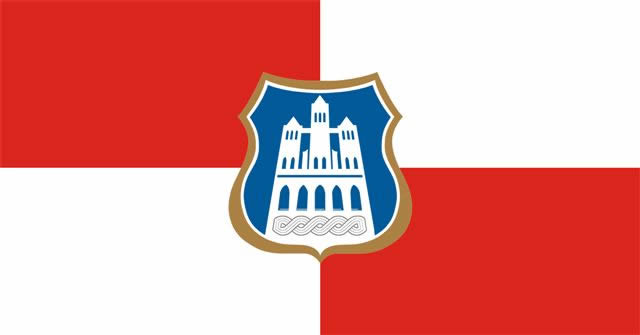
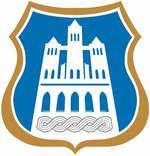
- Flag Coat of arms

- Location of Grude within Bosnia and Herzegovina

- Location within Bosnia and Herzegovina
- Coordinates: 43°22′21″N 17°24′51″E
- Country: Bosnia and Herzegovina
- Entity: Federation of Bosnia and Herzegovina
- Canton: West Herzegovina
- Geographical region: Herzegovina

Government
  - Municipal mayor: Ljubo Grizelj (HDZ BiH)

Area
  - Total: 220.8 km^{2} (85.3 sq mi)
  - Land: 220.8 km^{2} (85.3 sq mi)
  - Water: 0 km^{2} (0 sq mi)

Population (2013)
  - Total: 17,865
  - Density: 80.91/km^{2} (209.6/sq mi)
- Demonym: Gruđani
- Time zone: UTC+1 (CET)
  - Summer (DST): UTC+2 (CEST)
- Post code: 88340
- Area code: +387 (0)39
- Patron saint: Saint Kate
- Website: www.grude.info

Grude (Serbian Cyrillic: Груде; pronounced [ɡrûde]) is a town and a municipality located in West Herzegovina Canton of the Federation of Bosnia and Herzegovina, an entity of Bosnia and Herzegovina.

== Geography ==
Grude is located 49 kilometers from Mostar, 19 kilometers from Imotski, and 100 km from Split.

== History ==
=== Prehistory and antiquity ===
Evidence of human habitation in the area dates back to prehistoric times. Archaeological finds from Ravlić Cave, located near Drinovci, indicate settlement during the late Neolithic period. Human presence in the region continued uninterrupted through successive periods, with changing cultures and populations.

During antiquity, the area formed part of the Roman Empire. A Roman commercial road connecting the major centres of Salona and Narona passed through the region. Archaeological excavations at Gorica have confirmed the existence of a significant Roman settlement, indicating sustained activity during the Roman period.

=== Middle Ages ===
Following the decline of Roman authority in the late antiquity period, the region became part of the medieval South Slavic world. From the early Middle Ages onward, the area was continuously inhabited.

The medieval period is marked by the widespread presence of stećak medieval tombstones, which are found throughout the municipality of Grude, indicating a stable population during this era. The region's favourable geographical position, relatively mild climate, and access to natural resources contributed to its continued habitation.

The late Middle Ages were shaped by the Ottoman expansion, which reached the area in the second half of the 15th century.

=== Modern times ===
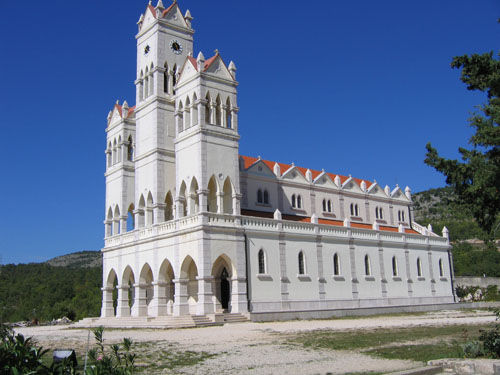
Church of St. Catherine, Grude

Following Ottoman rule, which lasted from the late 15th century until the late 19th century, the region came under Austro-Hungarian administration in 1878. During this transitional period, schools and infrastructure associated with modern state administration were established.

After World War II in Yugoslavia, and throughout the period of the Socialist Federal Republic of Yugoslavia (1945–1992), Grude—like much of West Herzegovina—was labelled by the authorities as a pro-Ustasha area. As a result, the municipality received limited state investment, contributing to economic hardship and significant emigration during the mid-to-late 20th century, particularly to Zagreb, Dalmatia, and West Germany as Gastarbeiter.

During the early 1990s, amid the breakup of Yugoslavia and the Bosnian War (1992–1995), Grude became a political and military centre. The Croatian Republic of Herzeg-Bosnia and the Croatian Defense Council (HVO) were established in the town, which also served as the location of the HVO's main headquarters.

In the post-war period, the municipality has developed into one of the more economically active areas in Bosnia and Herzegovina, with a number of small and medium-sized enterprises; the Violeta paper factory is among its most prominent companies.

== Settlements ==
- Blaževići
- Borajna
- Donji Mamići
- Dragičina
- Drinovačko Brdo
- Drinovci
- Gorica
- Grude
- Jabuka
- Puteševica
- Ružići
- Sovići
- Tihaljina

== Demographics ==
=== 1971 ===
19,203 total

- Croats - 19,111 (99.52%)
- others - 92 (0.48%)

=== 1991 ===
In the 1991 census, the municipality of Grude had a population of 16,358 residents:

- 16,210 Croats (99.09%)
- 148 others (0.91%)

The town of Grude had 3,528 residents; almost all of whom were ethnic Croats.

=== 2013 ===
In the 2013 census, the municipality of Grude had a population of 17,308 residents:

- 17,263 Croats (99.74%)
- 45 others (0.26%)

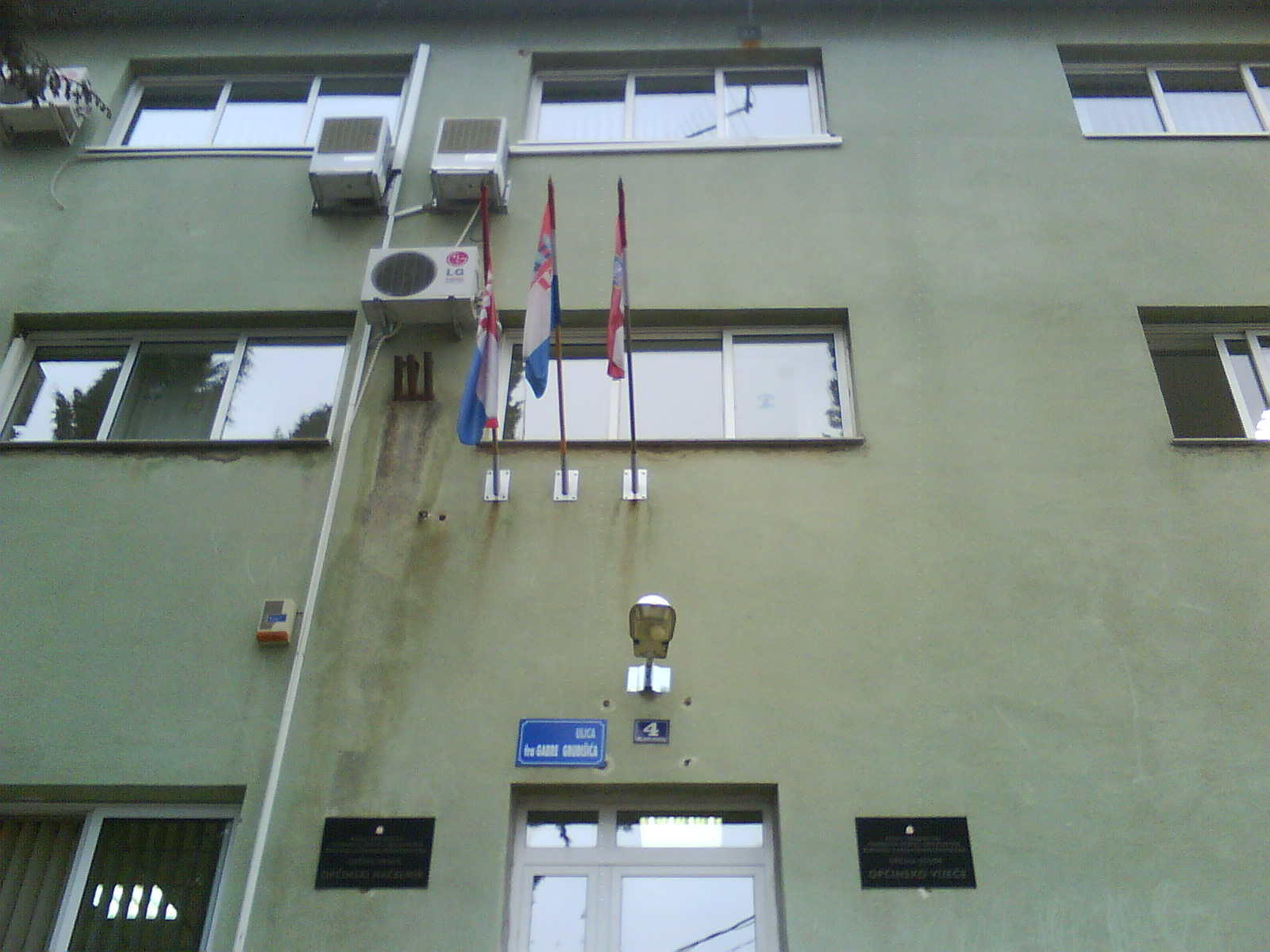
Grude council building

== Economy ==
During the war in Bosnia and Herzegovina, Grude was one of the bastions of the "rebellion" against the aggression of the Yugoslav Army. The late 1990s and early 2000s were marked by recent war and the struggle for survival, whereas today Grude is experiencing cultural and economic renaissance.

== Traffic and road connections ==
Grude is placed on the crossroads of two big roads: Slavonski Brod-Ploče and Mostar-Split. Through Grude goes master road M-6 Grude - Ljubuški - Čapljina - Metković, and master road M-17.5 Posušje - Grude - Privalj - Široki Brijeg - Mostar. Besides that there are also 2 regional roads:

- R-421: Sovići - Klobuk
- R-421a: Krenica - State Border

== Sports ==
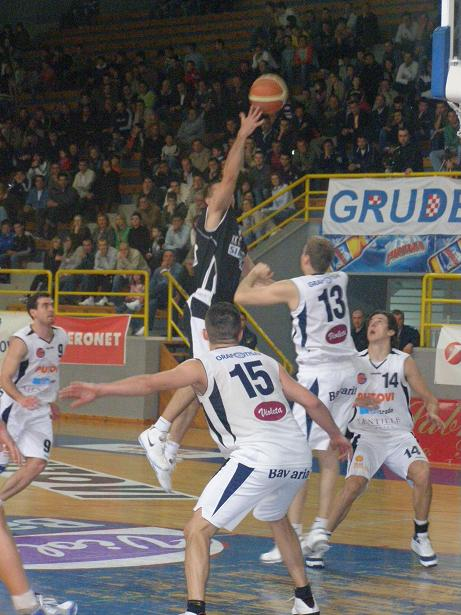
HKK Grude - KK Igokea, 2008.

The town is home to the football club HNK Grude, basketball club HKK Grude, and the female handball club HŽRK Grude. NK Drinovci is based in Drinovci (located in the same municipality). De Boules clubs Grude and Sv. Stipan based in Sovići.

== International relations ==
=== Twin towns – Sister cities ===
Grude is twinned with:

- Slunj, Croatia
- Baldissero Torinese, Italy

== Notable people ==
- Milan Bandić, former mayor of Zagreb
- Mate Boban, first president of Herzeg-Bosnia
- Rafael Boban, military commander of Ustaše Militia and Croatian Armed Forces during World War II
- Ljubo Jurčić, former Croatian Minister of Economy
- Goran Marić, former Croatian Minister of State Property
- Mirko Marić, Croatian footballer
- Mile Pešorda, Croatian writer
- Andrijica Šimić, Herzegovinian hajduk
- Antun Branko Šimić, Croatian poet
- Blago Zadro, a commander of the northern part of Croatian forces in Vukovar during the Croatian War of Independence

== Communications ==
Radio Grude broadcasts from the town.
