= List of decisions of the Constitutional Court of Bosnia and Herzegovina =

A select number of decisions from the Constitutional Court of Bosnia and Herzegovina have proven to have a profound effect on legal and political situation in Bosnia and Herzegovina. The notable decisions of the Court are listed in chronological order.

== Decision on the constitutionality of the peace agreement ==
On 13 October 1997, the Croatian 1861 Law Party and the Bosnia-Herzegovina 1861 Law Party requested the Constitutional Court to annul several decisions and to confirm one decision of the Supreme Court of the Republic of Bosnia and Herzegovina and, more importantly, to review the constitutionality of the General Framework Agreement for Peace in Bosnia and Herzegovina, since they alleged that the agreement violated the Constitution of Bosnia and Herzegovina in a way that it undermined the integrity of the state and that it may cause the dissolution of Bosnia and Herzegovina. The Court reached the conclusion that it is not competent to decide the disputes in regard to the mentioned decisions, since the applicants were not subjects that were identified in Article VI.3 (a) of the Constitution, in regard to those who can refer disputes to the Court. The Court also rejected the other request stating:

[T]he Constitutional Court is not competent to evaluate the constitutionality of the General Framework Agreement as the Constitutional Court has in fact been established under the Constitution of Bosnia and Herzegovina in order to uphold this Constitution [...] The Constitution of Bosnia and Herzegovina was adopted as Annex IV to the General Framework Agreement for Peace in Bosnia and Herzegovina, and consequently there cannot be a conflict or a possibility for controversy between this Agreement and the Constitution of Bosnia and Herzegovina.

This was one of the early cases in which the Court had to deal with the question of the legal nature of the Constitution. By making the remark in the manner of obiter dictum concerning the Annex IV (the Constitution) and the rest of the peace agreement, the Court actually "established the ground for legal unity" of the entire peace agreement, which further implied that all the annexes are in the hierarchical equality. In later decisions the Court confirmed this by using other annexes of the peace agreement as a direct base for the analysis and not only in the context of systematic interpretation of the Annex IV. However, since the Court rejected the presented request of the appellants, it did not go into details concerning the controversial questions of the legality of the process in which the new Constitution (Annex IV) came to power, and replaced the former Constitution of the Republic of Bosnia and Herzegovina. The Court used the same reasoning to dismiss the similar claim in a later case.

== Decision on the constituency of peoples ==
On 12 February 1998, Alija Izetbegović, at the time Chair of the Presidency of Bosnia and Herzegovina, instituted proceedings before the Constitutional Court for an evaluation of the consistency of the Constitution of the Republika Srpska and the Constitution of the Federation of Bosnia and Herzegovina with the Constitution of Bosnia and Herzegovina. The request was supplemented on 30 March 1998 when the applicant specified which provisions of the Entities' Constitutions he considered to be unconstitutional. The four partial decisions were made in a year 2000, by which many of articles of the constitutions of entities were found to be unconstitutional, which had a great impact on politics of Bosnia and Herzegovina, because there was a need to adjust the current state in the country with the decision of the Court. There was a narrow majority (5-4), in the favor of the applicant. In its third partial decision, among other things, the Court stated:

[T]he provisions of the Preamble are thus a legal basis for reviewing all normative acts lower in rank in relation to the Constitution of BiH for as long as the aforesaid Preamble contains constitutional principles delineating [...] spheres of jurisdiction, the scope of rights or obligations, or the role of the political institutions. The provisions of the preamble are therefore not merely descriptive, but are also invested with a powerful normative force thereby serving as a sound standard of judicial review for the Constitutional Court [...] [E]lements of a democratic state and society as well as underlying assumptions – pluralism, just procedures, peaceful relations that arise out of the Constitution – must serve as a guideline for further elaboration of the issue of the structure of BiH as a multi-ethnic state [...] Territorial delimitation [of Entities] must not serve as an instrument of ethnic segregation – on the contrary – it must accommodate ethnic groups by preserving linguistic pluralism and peace in order to contribute to the integration of the state and society as such [...] Constitutional principle of collective equality of constituent peoples, arising out of designation of Bosniacs, Croats and Serbs as constituent peoples, prohibits any special privileges for one or two constituent peoples, any domination in governmental structures and any ethnic homogenization by segregation based on territorial separation [...] [D]espite the territorial division of BiH by establishment of two Entities, this territorial division cannot serve as a constitutional legitimacy for ethnic domination, national homogenisation or the right to maintain results of ethnic cleansing [...] Designation of Bosniacs, Croats and Serbs as constituent peoples in the Preamble of the Constitution of BiH must be understood as an all-inclusive principle of the Constitution of BiH to which the Entities must fully adhere, pursuant to Article III.3 (b) of the Constitution of BiH.

The Court dealt with the following questions: the legal status entities, legal nature of the Constitution of B&H, prohibition of discrimination, equality of constituent peoples, the status of the orthodox church in RS and equality of language and script. The formal name of this item is U-5/98, but it is widely known as the "Decision on the constituency of peoples" (Bosnian: Odluka o konstitutivnosti naroda), referring to the Court's interpretation of the significance of the phrase "constituent peoples" used in the Preamble of the Constitution of Bosnia and Herzegovina. The decision was also the basis for other notable cases that came before the court.

== Decision on the Council of Ministers ==
On 11 February 1999, Mirko Banjac, at the time Deputy Chair of the House of Representatives of the Parliamentary Assembly of Bosnia and Herzegovina, instituted a request for, among other issues, the evaluation of the constitutionality of the Law on the Council of Ministers of Bosnia and Herzegovina and the Ministries of Bosnia and Herzegovina (Official Gazette of Bosnia and Herzegovina, No. 4/97) which foresaw the existence of two Co-Chairs and a vice-chair of the Council of Ministers. In its decision the Court had, among other things, stated the following:

Article V.4 of the Constitution of Bosnia and Herzegovina defines the Council of Ministers of Bosnia and Herzegovina, which is composed of the Chair of the Council of Ministers and a certain number of ministers as may be appropriate, who are responsible for the implementation of the policy and the decisions of Bosnia and Herzegovina from within the competencies of the institutions of Bosnia and Herzegovina; the Presidency of Bosnia and Herzegovina appoints the Chair of the Council of Ministers of Bosnia and Herzegovina, who assumes the office upon the approval by the House of Representatives of the Parliamentary Assembly of Bosnia and Herzegovina; the Chair of the Council of Ministers appoints the Minister of Foreign Affairs, the Minister of Foreign Trade and other ministers as may be appropriate (no more than two thirds of the ministers may be appointed from the territory of the Federation of Bosnia and Herzegovina), who assume the office upon the approval by the House of Representatives; also, the Chair appoints deputy ministers (who may not be from the same constituent people as their ministers), who assume the office upon the approval by the House of Representatives. It follows from what has been stated above that the challenged provisions of the law defining the Co-Chairs and the Vice-Chair of the Council of Ministers are not in accordance with the Constitution of Bosnia and Herzegovina, since the Constitution clearly establishes the traditional function of a Prime Minister designate who also appoints the ministers according to Article V.4 of the Constitution of Bosnia and Herzegovina.

The Court gave the Parliamentary Assembly of Bosnia and Herzegovina a three-month period from the date of publication of its decision on this matter in the "Official Gazette of Bosnia and Herzegovina" to bring the contested provisions of the Law in conformity with the Constitution of Bosnia and Herzegovina. After the Parliamentary Assembly failed to do that the Court, acting upon the request of the applicant and pursuant to its decision of 14 August 1999 and the legal standpoint exemplified in the reasons of the decision, established that certain provisions of the Law on Ministers and Ministries shall cease to be valid.

== Decision on the relationship between the Court and the Human Rights Chamber for B&H ==
On 20 April 1998, the Office of the Public Attorney of the Federation of Bosnia and Herzegovina challenged the Decision of the Human Rights Chamber for Bosnia and Herzegovina in Case No. CH/96/30, claiming that it was not in conformity with the national laws and international conventions. The Constitutional Court had to decide whether it had an appellate jurisdiction over the decisions of the Human Rights Chamber for Bosnia and Herzegovina, the later being an institution of a special nature also vested with judicial functions with respect to alleged violations of human rights as provided for in Annex 6 to the Dayton Agreement, unlike the Constitutional Court regulated in Annex 4 (the Constitution of Bosnia and Herzegovina) of the same Agreement. In its majority decision (4-1), the Court had, among other things, held the following:

The provisions of these two Annexes should [...] be considered to supplement each other, and in view of the link between these two Annexes, it can be concluded with certainty that the rules contained in the Agreement on Human Rights cannot be contrary to the Constitution of Bosnia and Herzegovina [...] It is thus clear that human rights issues fall under the jurisdiction of both the Constitutional Court and the Human Rights Chamber. There is no mention in the Constitution of Bosnia and Herzegovina or in any other law of a specific hierarchy or other relationship between the Constitutional Court and the Human Rights Chamber [...] [C]orrect interpretation must be that the authors did not intend to give either one of these institutions the competence to review the decisions of the other, but rather considered that, in regard to human rights issues, the Constitutional Court and the Human Rights Chamber should function as parallel institutions, neither of them being competent to interfere in the work of the other and it being left in some cases to the discretion of applicants to make a choice between these alternative remedies.

Thus, the Court held that it had no jurisdiction and that the appeal had to be rejected. The Court had recognized that the situation created by the Dayton Agreement might result in certain problems such as possible conflicting case law concerning some human rights issues, however it also concluded that the problem was mostly of a temporary nature since the Agreement foresaw the possibility of the transfer of the competence in this area to the institutions of Bosnia and Herzegovina dealing with human rights. The Human Rights Chamber of B&H existed in the period of 1996–2003, and after 1 January 2004 new cases alleging human rights violations are decided by the Constitutional Court of B&H.

== Decisions concerning the High Representative in Bosnia and Herzegovina ==
=== Decision on the competency to review the laws enacted by the High Representative ===
On 7 February 2000, eleven members of the House of Representatives of the Parliamentary Assembly of B&H initiated proceedings before the Constitutional Court for the evaluation of the constitutionality of the Law on State Border Service that was enacted by the High Representative for B&H on 13 January 2000, and later published in the Official Gazette of B&H. Among other issues, the applicants contended that the High Representative did not have the normative powers to impose a law in the absence of a vote by the Parliamentary Assembly. In its majority decision (7-2), the Court had, among other things, held the following:

[T]he High Representative – whose powers under Annex 10 to the General Framework Agreement, the relevant resolutions of the Security Council and the

Bonn Declaration as well as his exercise of those powers are not subject to review by the Constitutional Court – intervened in the legal order of Bosnia and Herzegovina substituting himself for the national authorities. In this respect, he therefore acted as an authority of Bosnia and Herzegovina and the law which he enacted is in the nature of a national law and must be regarded as a law of Bosnia and Herzegovina [...] The competence given to the Constitutional Court to "uphold the Constitution" [...] confers on the Constitutional Court the control of the conformity with the Constitution of Bosnia and Herzegovina of all acts, regardless of the author, as long as this control is based on one of the competences enumerated in Article VI.3 of the Constitution of Bosnia and Herzegovina [...] The competence of the Constitutional Court to examine conformity with the Constitution of

Bosnia and Herzegovina of the Law on State Border Service enacted by the High Representative, acting as an institution of Bosnia and Herzegovina, is thus based on Article VI.3 (a) of the Constitution of Bosnia and Herzegovina.

Thus, although the Constitutional Court declined to review the "exercise" of the powers of the High Representative with regards the possible justification of his intervention in the legislative process of B&H, the Court did declare that it has the competency to review his actions when he acts as a legislator. The Court subsequently determined that the law reviewed was in conformity with the Constitution.

=== Decision on the authority of the High Representative to change the laws ===
On 12 October 2000, thirty-four representatives of the National Assembly of Republika Srpska submitted a request to the Constitutional Court of B&H for the evaluation of the conformity of the Decision on Amending the Law on Travel Documents of B&H, adopted by the High Representative on 29 September 2000, with the Constitution of B&H. Besides the general claims that the High Representative can only interpret laws, and thus cannot create them, the applicants, among other issues, asserted that the High Representative cannot amend the Law on Travel Documents by a decision, since a decision represents an act of weaker legal force than laws. In its majority decision, the Court had, among other things, held the following:

The question whether it was necessary to adopt the Decision despite the fact that the Law on Travel Documents already existed is a question of legislative policy and not a constitutional question. In this respect, the High Representative substituted domestic authorities in taking the view that amendments to the existing law were required [...] As for the question of whether the decision of the High Representative is in conformity with Article 34 of the Law on Citizenship of Bosnia and Herzegovina, it is sufficient to point out that the Law on Citizenship is not a constitutional regulation. Therefore, the Constitutional court may not use the Law as the legal basis for review of the constitutionality. Otherwise, the Constitution of Bosnia and Herzegovina would be interpreted on the basis of the ordinary law. This would alter the whole hierarchy of the legal system which follows from the provision of Article III.3 (b) on the supremacy of the Constitution of Bosnia and Herzegovina.

Thus, the Court held that the High Representative has the authority not only to enact the laws, but also to change them, and although the Court could not review the authority of the High Representative in that regard it could review the laws that he had enacted or changed. It also held that the Decision Amending the Law on Travel Documents of Bosnia and Herzegovina was in conformity with the Constitution of B&H.

=== Decision on the competency to review decisions of the High Representative to remove public officials ===
On 27 March 2001, 37 representatives of the House of Representatives of the Parliament of the Federation of B&H, as well as Edhem Bičakčić, filed an appeal against the Decision of the High Representative for B&H to remove Edhem Bičakćić from the office of director general of "Elektroprivreda BiH" (public company for distribution of electric energy) and to prohibit him from holding any public or appointed office unless or until such time as the High Representative may expressly authorize him to hold such office. Bičakćić was removed on the grounds of criminal offenses that were allegedly committed during the performance of his duties as the Prime Minister of the Federation of B&H. The appellants alleged that the challenged Decision of the High Representative was unconstitutional in regard to both the competence to take such a decision and the substance of the decision, particularly because it was taken, in their opinion, without applying any criteria and without applying a fair procedure for establishing the truth. Thus, the applicants asked the Court to grant the appeals and quash the decision of the High Representative. In its unanimous decision, the Court had, among other things, held the following:

According to Article VI.3 (b) of the Constitution of Bosnia and Herzegovina, the Constitutional Court shall have appellate jurisdiction over issues under this Constitution arising out of a judgment of any other court in Bosnia and Herzegovina. The Constitutional Court finds that the decision of the High Representative to remove Mr. E. B. from the office of director general of 'Elektroprivreda BiH' and to prohibit him from holding public office cannot be considered a judgment by a court. It follows that the Constitutional Court has no appellate jurisdiction under Article VI.3 (b) of the Constitution of Bosnia and Herzegovina concerning this decision.

Thus, the Constitutional Court held that it cannot review a decision of the High Representative to remove a public official under Article VI.3 (a) Constitution of Bosnia and Herzegovina.

=== Decision on right to effective remedy after removal from public office by the High Representative ===
In 2005, Milorad Bilbija and Dragan Kalinić lodged appeals before the Constitutional Court against decisions of ordinary courts that had dismissed their appeals against the decisions of the High Representative concerning them. Bilbija was removed by the decision of the High Representative from his position of Deputy Head of the Operative Administration of the Intelligence and Security Agency in Banja Luka and from other public and party positions, while Kalinić was removed from his position as Chairman of the National Assembly of Republika Srpska and President of the Serbian Democratic Party. Both were also barred from other public and party duties that they were performing, and from holding any official, elective or appointive public office and from running in elections and from office within political parties unless or until such time the High Representative, by his subsequent decision, expressly authorizes them to do or hold the same, also ending any entitlements they had to receive remuneration or any privileges or status they had from those positions. Both complained that this violated their rights to effective legal remedy, to a fair trial, to no punishment without law, to freedom of expression, to freedom of assembly and association, to non-discrimination and to free elections. In its unanimous decision, the Court had, among other things, held the following:

In the case at hand the question is raised as to whether the appellants have an effective legal remedy available against the decision of the High Representative by which they could challenge the said decisions as referred to in Article 13 of the European Convention [...] Having regard to the said powers of the High Representative, the Opinion of the Venice Commission as well as the decisions of ordinary courts, which are adopted in the proceedings initiated by the appellants against the decisions of the High Representative, it follows that there is no effective legal remedy against the decisions of the High Representative available within the existing legal system of Bosnia and Herzegovina [...] However, the Constitutional Court must consider a further question. Does the special status of the High Representative or the sources of his authority in the General Framework Agreement for Peace in Bosnia and Herzegovina and various resolutions of the United Nations Security Council deprive the claimants of rights under the Constitution of Bosnia and Herzegovina or prevent positive obligations attaching to the State of Bosnia and Herzegovina to protect any such rights? [...] [T]he Constitutional Court considers that the obligations of Bosnia and Herzegovina in public international law to co-operate with the High Representative and to act in conformity with decisions of the UN Security Council cannot determine the constitutional rights of people who are within the jurisdiction of Bosnia and Herzegovina [...] Court holds that there is nothing in the international legal context from which this case arises to compel it to reach a conclusion different from the one to which it would arrive merely on the basis of its interpretation of the rights in their national constitutional context. It follows from the aforesaid that the State has a positive obligation to ensure respect for fundamental human rights enshrined in the Constitution of Bosnia and Herzegovina or arising from international treaties, however, the source of their legal force is in the Constitution of Bosnia and Herzegovina, as it is in the present case the individual’s right to an effective legal remedy [...] The Constitutional Court notes that Bosnia and Herzegovina, through the Steering Board of the Peace Implementation Council and Security Council of the United Nations, a body in charge of nominating and confirming the appointment of the High Representative, was obliged to make an effort in pointing to the alleged violations of constitutional rights of individuals on the grounds of lack of an effective legal remedy and thus ensure the protection of constitutional rights of its citizens. Having regard to the aforesaid, the Constitutional Court established that there is no effective legal remedy available within the existing legal system of Bosnia and Herzegovina against individual decisions of the High Representative concerning the rights of individuals, nor has Bosnia and Herzegovina undertaken the activities, required by its positive obligation, to ensure an effective legal remedy against the said decisions of the High Representative through the bodies in charge of nominating and appointing the High Representative.

Thus, the Court held that the appellants' right to an effective legal remedy under Article 13 of the European Convention has been violated, and that Bosnia and Herzegovina had a positive obligation to protect the constitutional rights of appellants in that regard. Up until this decision the Court had been rejecting the appeals lodged against the Decisions of the High Representative, initially finding itself not competent and subsequently holding that those appeals were premature. The Court however did not decide in merits on what standard of human rights the High Representative was to comply with, nor did it order the establishment of independent judicial body to review decisions of the High Representative in similar cases. Decision of the Court led to a vigorous response from the High Representative: on 23 March 2007 he issued a decision removing any practical effect from the Courts decision. Kalinić and Bilbija submitted the application before the European Court of Human Rights, but their application was declared incompatible ratione personae. Subsequently, the High Representative lifted the ban imposed on Dragan Kalinić.

=== Decision quashing the ruling of a court based on a decision by the High Representative ===
On 15 October 2001, Ante Jelavić lodged an appeal with the Constitutional Court against the ruling of the Cantonal Court in Sarajevo which dismissed Jelavić's appeal against the ruling of an investigative judge of the Cantonal Court in Sarajevo on the conduct of investigation against Jelavić. Although the judge confirmed that the alleged offenses were committed in Mostar, he based his competency, among other things, on the Decision of the High Representative of 26 April 2001, on establishing the territorial and subject-matter competence of the Cantonal Court in Sarajevo "for conducting investigation and first instance trial against perpetrators of all criminal acts" arising from certain events in which the appellant was allegedly involved. Jelavić raised an objection to the territorial competence of the Cantonal Court in Sarajevo, stating that the Cantonal Court in Mostar was competent for conducting the proceedings and that his right to a fair trial was violated. In its unanimous decision, the Court had, among other things, held the following:

[...] Decision of the High Representative is regarded as the law of the Federation of Bosnia and Herzegovina. This Decision derogates the respective provisions of the Criminal Procedure Code, which rather comprehensively specify the issue of territorial competence with regards to offenses. The restriction of legal rights in a democratic society may be effectuated by amending laws or in some other legitimate way. Undoubtedly, such is the legitimacy of the High Representative [...] Thus the High Representative shall have a sovereign authority in decision-making in that sense. However, the High Representative, interfering with the legal system of Bosnia and Herzegovina on the basis of "functional duality", is, however, obliged to respect the Constitution and constitutional principles of Bosnia and Herzegovina. The acts passed by the High Representative have to have a positive reflection on the principle of democracy, legal state and on the guarantees of a fair trial. In the present case, the Decision of the High Representative does not contain a reasoning which would justify the general interest of restriction of the rights provided for in the Criminal Procedure Code. The reasons for the derogation of the respective provisions of this Law are not clearly specified in the Decision insofar as the events stated in paragraph 1 of this Decision are concerned. The Decision has been imposed, which is in breach of the principle of democracy and legal state, provided for in Article 112 of the Constitution of Bosnia and Herzegovina. In view of the aforementioned, the Constitutional Court concludes that the Cantonal Court in Sarajevo, in its ruling No. KV-645/01 of 18 December 2001, incorrectly found itself territorially competent, thereby violating Article 6 of the European Convention.

The Court granted the appeal of Ante Jelavić, and quashed the rulings of the Cantonal Court of Sarajevo and designated the Cantonal Court in Mostar as territorially competent to conduct the investigation. This was also the first and the only time the Constitutional Court had determined that a legislative measure of the High Representative was unconstitutional.

=== Decision on imposition of arbitration by the High Representative ===
On 29 June 2001, Živko Radišić, a member of the Presidency of B&H submitted a request to the Constitutional Court for deciding the dispute between the Republika Srpska and Federation of B&H on the Inter-Entity Boundary Line between Dobrinja I and Dobrinja IV and for review of the constitutionality of the Decision of the High Representative which ties both the Republika Srpska and the Federation of B&H into final and binding arbitration on the Inter-Entity Boundary Line in the Sarajevo suburbs of Dobrinja I and IV, No. 84/01 of 5 February 2001 and the Arbitration Award by an independent Arbitrator for Dobrinja I and IV. In its unanimous decision, the Court had, among other things, held the following:

The High Representative is vested with general competence for implementation of civilian aspects of the Peace Agreement. He is authorized to oversee its implementation, to facilitate it and to judge whether any difficulties arising out of the civilian implementation of the Peace Agreement need to be resolved. He is also the final authority in theatre to interpret the said agreement [...] In the present case, the Constitutional Court notes that the Decision of the High Representative and the Arbitration Award did not interfere with the legislative prerogatives assigned to the domestic legislation of Bosnia and Herzegovina by the Constitution. As the dispute arises under the framework of Annex 2 of the General Framework Agreement for Peace in Bosnia and Herzegovina, the challenged decisions were adopted according to the specific powers of the High Representative regarding the interpretation of the Agreement on the Civilian Implementation of the Peace Agreement [...] Considering that the challenged decisions do not have the characteristics of a law, the Constitutional Court is not competent to review their constitutionality.

Thus, the Court rejected the submission as inadmissible, as it held that it is not competent to adopt a decision.

== Decision on jurisdiction to review the laws of Bosnia and Herzegovina ==
On 8 February 2002, thirty-three representatives of the People's Assembly of the Republika Srpska submitted a request to the Constitutional Court of Bosnia and Herzegovina for a review of constitutionality of Article 18.8, paragraph 3 of the Election Law of Bosnia and Herzegovina, which they considered to be discriminatory. In admissibility stage the Court had to consider the provisions of the Article VI.3 of the Constitution of Bosnia and Herzegovina which does not expressly grant the jurisdiction to the Court to review the constitutionality of the laws adopted at the state level. The Court unanimously held the following:

Although the provision of Article VI.3 (a) of the Constitution of Bosnia and Herzegovina

does not provide for the Constitutional Court to have an explicit jurisdiction to review the constitutionality of the laws or provisions of the laws of Bosnia and Herzegovina, the substantial jurisdiction specified by the Constitution of Bosnia and Herzegovina itself, indicates that the

Constitutional Court is entitled to exercise such jurisdiction, particularly having in mind the role of the Constitutional Court as the body which upholds the Constitution of Bosnia and Herzegovina. The position adopted by the Constitutional Court in its jurisprudence in such cases clearly points to the conclusion that the Constitutional Court is competent to review the constitutionality of a law, or particular provisions of the laws, of Bosnia and Herzegovina [...]

Although the Court had in the case no. U 1/99 implicitly held that it had jurisdiction to review the laws adopted at the state level, this was the first time it had expressly done so. In the merits stage the Court ruled against the applicants.

== Decision on the insignia of entities ==
On 12 April 2004, Sulejman Tihić, then Chairman of the Presidency of Bosnia and Herzegovina, filed a request with the Constitutional Court of Bosnia and Herzegovina for the review of constitutionality of Articles 1 and 2 of the Law on the Coat of Arms and Flag of the Federation of Bosnia and Herzegovina (Official Gazette of Federation of BiH No. 21/96 and 26/96), Articles 1, 2 and 3 of the Constitutional Law on the Flag, Coat of Arms and Anthem of the Republika Srpska (Official Gazette of the Republika Srpska No. 19/92), Articles 2 and 3 of the Law on the Use of Flag, Coat of Arms and Anthem (Official Gazette of the Republika Srpska No. 4/93) and Articles 1 and 2 of the Law on the Family Patron-Saint's Days and Church Holidays of the Republika Srpska (Official Gazette of Republika Srpska No. 19/92). On 2 December 2004 the applicant submitted a supplement to the request. Two partial decisions were made in a year 2006, when the Court found that the coat of arms and flag of the Federation of B&H, and coat of arms, anthem, family patron-saint days and church holidays of Republika Srpska were unconstitutional. In its decision, among other things, the Court stated:

The Constitutional Court concludes that it is the legitimate right of the Bosniak and Croat people in the Federation of BiH and the Serb people in the Republika Srpska to preserve their tradition, culture and identity through legislative mechanisms, but an equal right must be given to the Serb people in the Federation of BiH and Bosniak and Croat peoples in Republika Srpska and other citizens of Bosnia and Herzegovina. The Constitutional Court further holds that it cannot consider as reasonable and justified the fact that any of the constituent peoples has a privileged position in preservation of tradition, culture and identity as all three constituent peoples and other citizens of Bosnia and Herzegovina enjoy the rights and fulfil obligations in the same manner as provided for in the Constitution of Bosnia and Herzegovina and Constitutions of the Entities. Moreover, it is of a particular importance the fact that the identity of the constituent peoples, education, religion, language, fostering culture, tradition and cultural heritage are defined in the Constitution of the Federation of BiH and Constitution of the Republika Srpska, as the vital national interests of the constituent peoples.

The formal name of the item is U-4/04, but it is widely known as "Decision on the insignia of entities" (Bosnian: Odluka o obilježjima entiteta), since its merritum was about the symbols of entities. The Court has ordered the Parliament of the Federation of Bosnia and Herzegovina and the National Assembly of Republika Srpska to bring the contested legal documents in line with the Constitution of Bosnia and Herzegovina within six months from the publishing date of its decision in the Official Gazette of Bosnia and Herzegovina. Since the harmonisation was not done in that granted time-limit, that Court has, on 27 January 2007, adopted the Ruling on failure to enforce in which it established that the contested articles of the interpreted legal documents shall cease to be in force as of the date following the publishing date of the Ruling in Official Gazette of Bosnia and Herzegovina. On 16 June 2007, the Government of Republika Srpska had adopted the provisional emblem of Republika Srpska, until it adopted the new Coat of Arms of Republika Srpska. It had also decided to use the melody of its former anthem "Bože pravde" as its new intermezzo anthem, but the Constitutional Court of Republika Srpska has declared such use of melody as unconstitutional as well, so the new anthem, "Moja Republika" was adopted. Both the new anthem (in relation to words moja zemlja – "my land") and new coat of arms have been contested by Bosniak members of National Assembly of Republika Srpska in front of the Constitutional Court of Republika Srpska. The Court declared the coat of arms to be unconstitutional since it did not represent Bosniaks in any way, while it rejected the claim in relation to the anthem.

== Decision on the names of the cities ==
=== Decision on removal of prefix "Srpski" ("Serbian") from names of the municipalities ===
On 30 July 2001, Sejfudin Tokić, Deputy Chair of the House of Peoples of the Parliamentary Assembly of Bosnia and Herzegovina at the time of its filing request, filed with the Constitutional Court of Bosnia and Herzegovina a request for a review of constitutionality of Articles 11 and 11(a) of the Law on Territorial Organization and Local Self-Government (Official Gazette of the Republika Srpska Nos. 11/94, 6/95, 26/95, 15/96, 17/96, 19/96, and 6/97) and the title itself of the Law on the Town of Srpsko Sarajevo as well as its Articles 1 and 2 (Official Gazette of the Republika Srpska Nos. 25/93, 8/96, 27/96 and 33/97). The Court made its decision in 2004, in which it declared the laws that changed the names of the cities to ones with prefixes "srpski" (Serbian), were unconstitutional and had to be changed (which was done later). In its decision, among other things, the Court stated:

The groups which are to be compared are in this case the Bosniac, Croat and Serb citizens of Bosnia and Herzegovina who should, according to a basic constitutional principle, be granted equal treatment throughout the territory of Bosnia and Herzegovina. However, the change of names by adding the adjective "srpski" before the names of certain towns or municipalities, by replacing a previous name with a new name indicating a Serb affiliation, or by eliminating in some cases the prefix "bosanski" demonstrates a clear intention and a wish to make it clear that the towns and municipalities concerned are to be regarded as exclusively Serb [...] In any case, the constitutional arguments against the choice of names indicating a specific Serb affiliation are so strong that in this case no reasonable proportionality exists between the means used and the aim sought to be realized [...] The Constitutional Court therefore concludes that the contested legal provisions are not consistent with the constitutional principle of the equality of the constituent peoples in Bosnia and Herzegovina. Moreover, they constitute discrimination contrary to Article II(4) in conjunction with Article II(5) of the Constitution of Bosnia and Herzegovina. In view of the fact that the provision of Article II(5) is an integral part of certain rights under Article II(3) of the Constitution of Bosnia and Herzegovina, the Constitutional Court concludes that this Article was also violated in the present case.

The formal name of the item is U-44/01, but it is widely known as the "Decision on the names of the cities" (Bosnian: Odluka o nazivima gradova).

This judgement is important not only because it was unanimous (no division according to ethnic lines inside the Court), but also because it elaborates the collective equality of the constituent peoples and accepts the symbolic importance of names.

=== Decision on removal of prefix "Bosanski" ("Bosnian") from names of the municipalities ===
On 7 September 2009, the Bosniak Caucus in the Council of Peoples of the Republika Srpska, represented by its President Edin Ramić, lodged an appeal with the Constitutional Court of Bosnia and Herzegovina against the decision of the Council for the Protection of Vital Interest of the Constitutional Court of the Republika Srpska (the "Council") No. UV-2/09 of 8 July 2009. At the same time the appellant sought a review of the constitutionality of the Rules of Procedure on the Operations of the Constitutional Court of the Republika Srpska and, within that request, sought adoption of an interim measure.

Previously the Chairman of the Council of Peoples of the Republika Srpska initiated the procedure for the protection of vital national interest of Bosniak people under the Law on Territorial Organization of the Republika Srpska before the Council since that Law did not include prefix "Bosnian" in front of the names of the municipalities of Brod and Kostajnica, which had such prefix before, and this prefix was also absent in the names of the municipalities whose names had been previously changed (Gradiška, Novi Grad, Šamac and Kozarska Dubica). The council had determined that the Law had not violated the vital national interest of Bosniak people. The appellants claimed that the council had violated the provisions of the Constitution of Bosnia and Herzegovina relating to non-discrimination, right to return and right to a fair hearing, as well as provisions of ECHR relating to non-discrimination and a right to a fair hearing. The majority (7-1) of the Court decided against the applicant. In its decision, among other things, the Court stated:

Once it is accepted that the adjective "Bosnian" does not relate to any of the constituent peoples, it is not possible to claim that the omission of that adjective from the name of the locality discriminates directly or indirectly any of the constituent peoples [...] [T]he only threat relate[s] to what the applicants adequately describe, in point 6 of their application, as a danger ... to cultural and historical identity of Bosnia and Herzegovina. However, the country itself does not have a right to non-discrimination, even if discrimination could be established [...] There does not exist evidence that the refugees and displaced persons would probably regard the naming of some locality that does not relate to any constituent people or geographical location of the country Bosnia and Herzegovina as creating a hostile environment.

The Court also decided that the decision of the Council for the Protection of Vital Interest of the Constitutional Court of the Republika Srpska is to be regarded as a "judgment of the court" in the meaning of the Constitution of Bosnia and Herzegovina, against which an application can be made to the Constitutional Court. However, the Court decided that it did not have the jurisdiction to review the constitutionality of the Rules of Procedure on the Operations of the Constitutional Court of the Republika Srpska since the collective right of the constitutional peoples of the protection of the vital national interests is a right of political nature that is not covered by the scope of "civil rights and obligations" as understood by the Constitution or the ECHR.

== Decisions on relation of the law of B&H and European Convention on Human Rights ==
=== Decision on the conformity of certain provisions of the Constitution of B&H with the ECHR and its Protocols ===
On 27 April 2004, Sulejman Tihić, at the time Chair of the Presidency of Bosnia and Herzegovina, instituted proceedings before the Constitutional Court for a review of conformity of the provisions of Articles IV.1, IV.1(a), IV.3(b) and V.1) of the Constitution of Bosnia and Herzegovina with the provision of Article 14 of the European Convention for the Protection of Human Rights and Fundamental Freedoms (henceforth: European Convention) and Article 3 of Protocol No. 1 to the European Convention. Since the noted Articles of the Constitution establish a de iure discrimination, especially in relation to "Others" (i.e. those that are not members of "constituent peoples"), a question arose about a possible conflict between international and domestic law, moreover since the Constitution itself states (in its Article II.2), that the European Convention "shall have the priority over all other law". The applicant argued that this meant that the European Convention has a priority even over the Constitution and not only sub-constitutional legal documents. The Court rejected the request as inadmissible, stating:

[I]n the present case an examination of conformity of certain provisions of the Constitution of BiH with the European Convention is requested, the Constitutional Court notes that the rights under the European Convention cannot have a superior status to the Constitution of BiH. The European Convention, as an international document, entered into force by virtue of the Constitution of BiH, and therefore the constitutional authority derives from the Constitution of BiH and not from the European Convention itself [...] The Constitutional Court must always hold on to the text of the Constitution of Bosnia and Herzegovina, which in the present case does not allow for wider interpretation of its jurisdiction, in view of the obligation of the Constitutional Court to "uphold this Constitution".

With this decision the Court has upheld the discriminatory nature of the Constitution and laws that find their legal basis in it. As a result, Jakob Finci, the president of Jewish community of Bosnia and Herzegovina, Dervo Sejdić, a Roma who has been legally abridged from becoming a member of the Presidency of Bosnia and Herzegovina or a member of House of Peoples of Bosnia and Herzegovina, have filed separate suits against Bosnia and Herzegovina in front of European Court of Human Rights, which acknowledged Finci's and Sejdić's ineligibility for presidency and House of Peoples to be in violation of the European Convention on Human Rights.

=== Decision on conformity of Election Law of B&H with ECHR ===
On 6 September 2005, Sulejman Tihić, Member of the Presidency of Bosnia and Herzegovina, filed a request with the Constitutional Court of Bosnia and Herzegovina for a review of conformity of Article 8.1 paragraphs 1 and 2 of the Election Law of Bosnia and Herzegovina with Article 3 of Protocol No. 1 to the European Convention for the Protection of Human Rights and Fundamental Freedoms and Article 1 of Protocol No. 12 to the European Convention, and Articles 2(1)(c) and 5(1)(c) of the International Convention on Elimination of All Forms of Racial Discrimination. This particularly related to the manner in which the members of the Presidency of B&H were elected, as well as total bar from the Presidency of the "Others" in the Election Law of B&H, which reflected almost identical constitutional provisions. The majority (7-2) of the Court rejected the request as inadmissible. In its decision, among other things, the Court stated:

[A]lthough the subject matter of the case at hand is not a review of conformity of the provisions of the Constitution of Bosnia and Herzegovina but of the Election Law, it cannot be ignored that the challenged provision of the Election Law, de facto, derive fully from the provisions of Article V of the Constitution of BiH, which remove any doubts as to its unconstitutionality. For these reasons, the Constitutional Court has no competence to decide because this would otherwise imply a review of conformity of the constitutional provision with the provisions of the international documents relating to the human rights, and it has already took the position that these, i.e. the European Convention, could not have a superior status in relation to the Constitution of BiH [...]

Unlike the case U-5/04, here three judges (Grewe and Palavrić dissenting and Feldman submitting separate opinion) thought that the case was admissible since it did not challenge the Constitutional provisions but the Election Law. Still, the majority decided not to go to the merits stage.

=== Decision on the appeal of Ilijaz Pilav ===
On 20 September 2006, Party for Bosnia and Herzegovina and Ilijaz Pilav filed an appeal with the Constitutional Court of Bosnia and Herzegovina against the Ruling of Court of BiH of 10 August 2006, and Decisions of Central Election Commission of 1 August 2006 and of 24 July 2006, which rejected the application for certification of the candidate Pilav on the Party's candidate list for the Presidency of Bosnia and Herzegovina, as Serb member, stating that he cannot be elected from the territory of Republika Srpska as he declares himself as Bosniak. Pilav and the Party argued that their rights have been violated, particularly that Pilav was discriminated on national/ethnic basis. The majority (7-2) of the Court decided against the applicants. In its decision, among other things, the Court stated:

There is no dispute that the provision of Article V of the Constitution of Bosnia and Herzegovina, as well as the provision of Article 8 of the Election Law have a restrictive character in a way that they restrict the rights of citizens with respect to the candidacy of Bosniaks and Croats from the territory of Republika Srpska and the Serbs from the territory of the Federation of Bosnia and Herzegovina to stand for election as members of the Presidency of Bosnia and Herzegovina. However, the purpose of those provisions is strengthening of the position of constituent peoples in order to secure that the Presidency is composed of the representatives from amongst these three constituent peoples. Taking into account the current situation in Bosnia and Herzegovina, the restriction imposed by the Constitution and Election Law, which exist with respect to the appellants' rights in terms of differential treatment of the appellant’s candidacy in relation to the candidacy of other candidates who are the Serbs and are directly elected from the territory of the Republika Srpska, is justified at this moment since there is a reasonable justification for such treatment. Therefore, given the current situation in BiH and specific nature of its constitutional order as well as bearing in mind the current constitutional and law arrangements, the challenged decisions of the Court of BiH and CEC did not violate the appellants' rights under Article 1 of the Protocol no. 12 to the European Convention and Article 25 of the International Covenant on Civil and Political Rights since the mentioned decisions are not arbitrary and are based on the law. It means that they serve a legitimate aim, that they are reasonably justified and that they do not place an excessive burden on the appellants given that the restrictions imposed on the appellants' rights are proportional to the objectives of general community in terms of preservation of the established peace, continuation of dialogue, and consequently creation of conditions for amending the mentioned provisions of the Constitution of Bosnia and Herzegovina and Election Law.

In this case the Court, for the first time, rejected the request on the merits, rather that declaring it as prima facie inadmissible. Two of the dissenting judges (Grewe and Palavrić) were of the opinion that differential treatment challenged by the appeal is not justified in an objective or in a proportionate manner.

== Decision regarding the general principles of international law ==
On 30 June 2009, Ilija Filipović, Chairman of the House of Peoples of Bosnia and Herzegovina filed a request for review of the constitutionality of the Law on Protection of Domestic Production under the CEFTA. He also requested the Constitutional Court to issue an interim measure whereby it would suspend the application of the challenged Law pending a decision on the request, which the Court granted. One of the initial problems for the Court was that the Constitution of Bosnia and Herzegovina does not contain any explicit provision defining the rank of international treaties in domestic law or attributing competence in this field to the Constitutional Court. In addition, the Court had to interpret the Article III(3)(b) which provides that the "general principles of international law shall be an integral part of the law of Bosnia and Herzegovina and the Entities". The majority (6-3) of the Court decided in the favor of the applicant. In its decision, among other things, the Court stated:

Firstly the internationalization is one of the most characteristic general principles of this Constitution [...] Secondly, there is no constitutional provision regulating the introduction of international treaties in domestic law as condition for their applicability; in particular, the Constitution does not prescribe to "transform" international rules in domestic law through a law [...] In this provision [Article III(3)(b)], the supremacy of the Constitution is closely linked either to the general principles of international law either to the competencies of the Constitutional Court, since the latter is charged with the constitutional review of the laws and more generally with the Constitution’s upholding (Article VI). Consequently, the competence of the Constitutional Court cannot be generally excluded. The question is nonetheless whether the general principles of international law entail any indication on the relationship between domestic laws and ratified international treaties. The Constitutional Court observes that one of the fundamental principles of international law, as referred to by the applicant, is the principle of pacta sunt servanda [...] Pursuant to the rule of pacta sunt servanda which constitutes an integral part of the law of Bosnia and Herzegovina and the Entities, within the meaning of Article III(3)(b) of the Constitution of Bosnia and Herzegovina, the CEFTA Convention imposes obligations on Bosnia and Herzegovina on the basis of multilateral treaties entered into by SFRY and taken over by Bosnia and Herzegovina. In view of the aforesaid, the Constitutional Court concludes that it is at least competent to review the laws which are adopted on the subjects having been previously covered by ratified treaties with regard to Articles VI(3)(a) and VI(3)(c) [...] In view of the aforesaid, the Constitutional Court holds that, pursuant to the rule of pacta sunt servanda, there is an indisputable obligation of the institutions in Bosnia and Herzegovina and first of all of the legislator, to comply with the provisions of the treaties and to execute them in good faith. Consequently, there is an obligation of the institutions of Bosnia and Herzegovina to bring all laws into line with the provisions of the CEFTA.

Thus, the Court established that the Law on the Protection of the Domestic Production under the CEFTA is inconsistent with Article III(3)(b) of the Constitution of Bosnia and Herzegovina and that it is quashed in its entirety.

In their Separate Joint Dissenting Opinion judges Feldman and Pantiru recognized the importance of pacta sunt servanda principle but still held that it has no more weight than laws passed by the legislators at the state or entity level and that it does not in any case entail giving provisions of treaties a status superior to that of Laws under the Constitution. Similarly, the President of the Court, Simović, in his dissenting opinion noted that "if interpreted in this manner, the entire international treaty law obtains a constitutional law level, which has not been the intention of the author of the Constitution."

== Decision on proportional representation in legislature of B&H ==
On 16 November 2009, Sulejman Tihić, then Chairman of the House of Peoples of Bosnia and Herzegovina, filed a request with the Constitutional Court of Bosnia and Herzegovina for the review of constitutionality of several Articles of the Election Law of Bosnia and Herzegovina and the Rules of Procedure of the House of Representatives of Bosnia and Herzegovina. The applicant claimed that although the principle of proportional representation of the three constituent peoples and other citizens has been respected in the executive of the Federation of BiH and Republika Srpska, as well as in the organs of the public authority and courts in the entities, it is not respected with regards the structure of the legislature in Bosnia and Herzegovina (at the state and entity levels) according to the census from 1991, and that the particular voting procedure in the House of Representatives, popularly called "the entity voting", has thus been transformed into "ethnic voting" where the ethnic majority from one or the other entity can promote its interests, as opposed to the interests and will of the other two constituent peoples from either entities, as well as the will of other citizens from the territory of those entities. Thus, the applicant claimed that the indicated provisions of the Electoral Law are not in conformity with the lines 3, 8 and 9 of the Preamble of the Constitution of Bosnia and Herzegovina and with the Article I/2 of the Constitution. The Court unanimously decided against the applicant. In its decision, among other things, the Court stated:

The Constitutional Court observes that neither the disputed Articles, nor the Election Law in general, contain any provision that grants any of the constitutional peoples the privileged status. Also, the Constitutional Court notes that there is no provision in the Constitution of Bosnia and Herzegovina that imposes an obligation on the legislator that the Election Law has to contain the provision on the mechanisms for ensuring the proportional representation of the constituent peoples regardless of the election results. In relation to the request of the applicant for assessment of the constitutionality of the disputed Articles of the Election Law because they do not contain provisions that, in the opinion of the applicant, they had to contain, the Constitutional Court emphasizes that the review of constitutionality cannot refer to something that the legislator had not prescribed.

The Court had particularly reiterated its previous decisions in the cases U-5/98 and U-8/04, with regards the notion of "effective participation of the constituent peoples in state authorities" which in principle means that officials appointed to positions in institutions of Bosnia and Herzegovina should be representative reflection of advanced co-existence of all peoples in Bosnia and Herzegovina, but that if such participation falls outside the constitutional framework, it must never be carried out or imposed at the expense of efficient operation of the state and its authorities.

== Decisions on international position of entities ==
=== Decision on constitutionality of political lobbying of foreign governments and international organizations by RS ===
On 15 September 2008, Haris Silajdžić, at the time the Chairman of the Presidency of B&H, lodged the request with the Constitutional Court in which it was requested that it should establish that the Decision of the Government of RS granting consent to the Agreement entered into between Hill & Knowlton International Belgium and the RS and the Memorandum of Agreement entered into between Quinn Gillespie & Associates and the RS, Conclusion of the RS Government, Memorandum of Agreement entered into between Quinn Gillespie & Associates and the RS and its Annex I, item 614700 of the RS Budget for 2008 and item 614700 of the RS Budget for 2009 (on the allocation of funds for the RS's representation abroad), and the activities of the RS carried out in the USA either directly or indirectly on the basis of the Memorandum of Agreement through the authorized Agent Quinn Gillespie & Associates and directed towards the government, institutions and officials of the US and officials of some international organizations, are inconsistent with Articles III(1)(a) and (b), III(3)(b), V(3)(a) and (c) and V(4)(a) of the Constitution of B&H. The majority (7-2) of the Court decided against the applicant. In its decision, among other things, the Court stated:

The Constitutional Court holds it unnecessary to define the Bosnia and Herzegovina’s foreign policy framework but it needs to underline the undisputed fact that foreign policy and foreign trade policy are the sole responsibility of Bosnia and Herzegovina, as stipulated in Article III(1)(a) and (b) of the Constitution of BiH. Also, the Constitutional Court of BiH recalls that the Entities have a constitutional basis for adopting their budgets, which determine a financial framework for revenue and expenditure. In the present case, the adoption of such a budget whereby the funds are allocated, inter alia, for the Republika Srpska’s representation abroad is not per se inconsistent with the Constitution of Bosnia and Herzegovina as it does not constitute a takeover of or interference with foreign policy and foreign trade policy of Bosnia and Herzegovina. However, the Constitutional Court of BiH considers that the issue of compliance with the constitutional division of responsibilities between Bosnia and Herzegovina and the Entities may be raised in case where the activities, which are undertaken by officials of the Entities and financed from the budgets of the Entities, constitute a takeover of or interference with some of the responsibilities of Bosnia and Herzegovina. Considering the activities undertaken by the Republika Srpska in the present case, the Constitutional Court of BiH holds that it did not relate to the establishment of diplomatic relations with another country, the conclusion of an agreement with another country or international organisation, nor did the Republika Srpska, through the aforementioned activities, represented itself abroad as an independent state, which would bring into question the division of responsibilities in respect of foreign policy and foreign trade policy. The Constitutional Court of BiH holds that the aforementioned activities undertaken by the Republika Srpska were aimed at lobbying abroad for the interest of the Republika Srpska as an Entity. Therefore, the Constitutional Court of BiH holds that the activities undertaken by the Republika Srpska as well as the formal acts passed by the Republika Srpska as the basis for any such activities contain nothing that relates to the sole responsibility of Bosnia and Herzegovina in the field of foreign affairs or foreign trade.

An important aspect of the Decision was the fact that the request was unanimously found to be admissible since it was held that a series of formal acts and activities undertaken by one of the Entities may raise an issue of existence of a dispute between the Entity and B&H over an issue under the Constitution of B&H in respect of which the Constitutional Court of BiH has sole jurisdiction to decide.

In her dissenting opinion, joint by judge Mirsad Ćeman, judge Seada Palavrić criticized the Court for not giving a definition of foreign policy and foreign trade policy, since, in her opinion, only a detailed interpretation could assist in determination of the exclusive competence of B&H in this area. She also reiterated the earlier decisions of the Court with regards the lack of international personality of the RS, while the analysis of the relevant documentation show that RS had acted not as an integral part of B&H but as an independent state conducting its foreign policy in an nontransparent matter.

=== Decision on the constitutionality of communication of RS with United Nations Security Council ===
On 24 November 2009, Beriz Belkić, at the time the Deputy Chairman of the House of Representatives of the Parliamentary Assembly of B&H, filed a request with the Constitutional Court for review of the constitutionality of the Second Report of the RS submitted to the UNSC on the Situation in B&H of 16 November 2009, as well as for review of the constitutionality of the activities of the RS taken either directly or indirectly through its authorized agent and directed towards the UNSC. The majority (5-3) of the Court decided against the applicant. In its decision, among other things, the Court stated:

[...] Constitutional Court will not give a definition of foreign policy in the case at hand. However, while considering the activities taken by the Republika Srpska in the case at hand and taking into account the content of the challenged Second Report of the Republika Srpska to the Security Council on the Situation in Bosnia and Herzegovina, i.e. the submission of the mentioned Report to the UN Security Council, the Constitutional Court considers that the contested report and activities do not represent a report of the State of Bosnia and Herzegovina nor they have in any way represented the State of Bosnia and Herzegovina before the UN Security Council in a way that would bring into question the constitutional division of competencies in terms of foreign policy. The Constitutional Court notes that there is nothing in the activities taken by the Government of the Republika Srpska by drafting and submitting the challenged Second Report to the UN Security Council on the situation in Bosnia and Herzegovina that could be considered foreign policy and thus included in the exclusive responsibility of Bosnia and Herzegovina. In addition, the Constitutional Court holds that in the present case there is no violation of the Constitution of Bosnia and Herzegovina, in particular as to the division of responsibilities between the State of Bosnia and Herzegovina and its Entities, i.e. no legally relevant activity based on the challenged Report was taken to the detriment of the constitutional position of the State of Bosnia and Herzegovina.

Importantly, the Court held that the acts and activities taken by one of the Entities, even of political nature, may raise an issue as to the existence of a dispute between the Entity and B&H over a matter under the Constitution of B&H, which only the Constitutional Court is competent to resolve.

Judge Mirsad Ćeman filed a dissenting opinion, joint by judges Seada Palavrić and Valerija Galić, in which he criticized the Court for not defining the term "foreign policy". Also, in his opinion the challenged activities of the RS included the matters and positions which, by their nature, fall within the scope of the foreign policy of B&H and, as such, they are within the sole responsibility of the B&H. He also held that the Government of RS, through the preparation and submission of the challenged Second Report, acted unilaterally on the international scene, which constituted an interference with the responsibilities of the State of B&H by the Entity. Finally, he did not agree with the majority that no legally relevant activity based on the challenged Report was taken to the detriment of the constitutional position of the B&H, since the preparation and submission of the challenged Second Report constituted such an activity and the damages for B&H arising from that activity are reflected in damages to the constitutional capacity, sovereignty and international subjectivity of B&H as a state.
