= Larisa Velić =

Bosnian lawyer

- Born: 1973 (age 52–53); Sarajevo
- Education: Faculty of Law Univezitet Heinrich-Heine Düsseldorf. Ruhr Universität Bochum
- Years active: 2000–
- Employer(s): Constitutional Court of Bosnia and Herzegovina

Larisa Velić is a Bosnian lawyer and professor of law who has served as a judge of the Constitutional Court of Bosnia and Herzegovina since 2025.

== Biography ==
Velić completed primary and secondary school in Sarajevo. She earned her law degree from the Heinrich Heine University of Düsseldorf's Faculty of Law in 2000. She earned her doctorate in legal sciences from the Ruhr Universität in Bochum in 2011.

She began her professional career as a trainee at the Supreme Regional Court of Düsseldorf in 2000, and since 2003 she has worked as a lawyer, first at the law firm Dr Walter und Boers in Düsseldorf, then at the law firm Schwarz & Tajić in Wuppertal, and from 2004 to 2012 at the law firm Mebus in Leverkusen. Since 2004, she has been an educator at the Center for the Education of Judges and Prosecutors of the Federation of Bosnia and Herzegovina and the Republika Srpska.

In the period from 2003 to 2011, she worked first as a legal expert, then as the Head of the Legal Department on the project "Land Administration in Bosnia and Herzegovina" at the Deutsche Gesellschaft für Internationale Zusammenarbeit/German Society for International Cooperation (GIZ), and from 2011 to 2018, she was the Deputy Head of the project for support to the judiciary in BiH - Strengthening Prosecutorial Capacity, which was implemented by the High Judicial and Prosecutorial Council of Bosnia and Herzegovina.

From 2013 until she assumed the position of judge of the Constitutional Court of Bosnia and Herzegovina, she worked at the Faculty of Law of the University of Zenica, first part-time, then as an assistant professor, associate professor, and full professor. From 2021 until her appointment to the Constitutional Court in 2013, she was the Dean of the Faculty of Law in Zenica. During the same period, she was the Chairwoman of the Senate of the University of Zenica.

She is the recipient of the Plaque of the Rectors' Conference/Rectors' Council of Bosnia and Herzegovina.

In May 2025, she took up the position of judge of the Constitutional Court of Bosnia and Herzegovina, replacing Seada Palavrić.

She is fluent in German and English.

== Bibliography ==
Velić is author or co-author of nine books:

- Komentar zakona o zemljišnim knjigama. Weike/Tajic. Privredna Štampa, Sarajevo (2005)
- Komentar Zakona o stvarnim pravima RS, Babic/Medic/Hasic/Povlakic/Velic; 2011;
- Das Erbbaurecht in Bosnien-Herzegowina im Vergleich zum Erbbaurecht in Deutschland. Larisa Velić. Berlin, mbv (2011)
- Komentar Zakona o stvarnim pravima FBiH. Babić/Medić/Hasić/Povlakić/Velić. Privredna štampa, Sarajevo (2014)
- Praktikum za stvarna prava, E. Hašić/L. Velić/G. Nezirović/I. Velić/H. Tajić. Privredna štampa, Sarajevo (2015)
- Tort law. E. Bikić/L. Velić. International Encyclopaedia of Laws. Kluwer law international (2021)
- Priručnik za primjenu zakona o stvarnim pravima u FBiH i RS (u organizaciji UNDPa), L.Velić i drugi. (2015)
- „Enabling the Business of Agriculture 2016: Comparing regulatory good practices report“ Mogućnosti poslovanja u sektoru poljoprivrede, L. Velić i ostali.. World Bank, Washington. (2016)
- Pravo građenja, Larisa Velić. Privredna štampa, Sarajevo (2024)
