= Miodrag Simović =

Miodrag Simović (born 3 November 1952 in Foča) is a Bosnian judge and academic, member of the Constitutional Court of Bosnia and Herzegovina. He declared ethnic affiliation as a Bosnian Serb.

== Biography ==
Simović graduated with honours from the University of Novi Sad Faculty of Law. In 1981, he obtained his master's degree in criminal law in Novi Sad, and defended his PhD dissertation at the same faculty in 1985. After completing his law studies he worked in the Ministry of Internal Affairs and in the Ministry of Justice and Administration of the Socialist Republic of Bosnia and Herzegovina. From 30 January 1991 until 25 October 1993 he held the office of the Vice-President of the Government of the Socialist Republic of Bosnia and Herzegovina and then Republic of Bosnia and Herzegovina.

From December 1998 to May 2003 Simović served as judge of the Constitutional Court of Republika Srpska.

In May 2003 Simović was appointed by the Republika Srpska National Assembly as judge of the Constitutional Court of Bosnia and Herzegovina; he served twice as vice president of the court. He is appointed Vice-President of the Constitutional Court of Bosnia and Herzegovina by the end of May 2003 and reappointed in May 2006. He filed a dissenting opinion on the Decision U-5/09 on the general principles of international law.

Simović is full professor of Law at the University of Banja Luka, where he chairs the criminal procedure law clinic; at the University of Bihać, where he teaches criminal procedural law; and at the University of East Sarajevo.

Simović is member of the editorial board in six scientific journals. Additionally, he is the editor-in-chief for Bosnia and Herzegovina of the Izbor sudske prakse review from Belgrade. He presented over 450 works to the scientific and professional community, including 22 books as author and 43 as co-author.

As of 2011, he is an international member of the Russian Academy of Natural Sciences and as of 2012 he is a corresponding member of the Academy of Sciences and Arts of Bosnia and Herzegovina (member of its presidency since 2014). As of 2014 he is a member of the European Academy of Sciences and Arts. He is member of the Academy of Arts and Sciences of Republika Srpska and of the Presidency of the Association of Lawyers of Republika Srpska.

== Bibliography ==
- Criminal Procedural Law of the Republika Srpska, (two editions) Banja Luka, 1997 and 1998
- Criminal Procedural Law, Istočno Sarajevo, 2001
- Criminal Procedures in Bosnia and Herzegovina, Banja Luka 2003
- Criminal Procedures in Bosnia and Herzegovina - collection of criminal procedural laws of Bosnia and Herzegovina with introductory comments and terminology register, Sarajevo, 2004
- Practical Commentary on the Law on Criminal Procedure of the RS, Banja Luka, 2005
- Criminal Procedural Law – introduction and general part, Bihać, 2005
- Criminal Procedural Law - special part, Banja Luka, 2006
