= Human Rights Chamber for Bosnia and Herzegovina =

The Human Rights Chamber for Bosnia and Herzegovina (Bosnian: Dom za ljudska prava za Bosnu i Hercegovinu), which was active between March 1996 and 31 December 2003, was a judicial body established in Bosnia and Herzegovina under Annex 6 to the General Framework Agreement for Peace in Bosnia and Herzegovina (Dayton Peace Agreement).

== Structure ==
The Chamber had the mandate to consider alleged or apparent violations of human rights as provided in the European Convention for the Protection of Human Rights and Fundamental Freedoms and the Protocols thereto, and alleged or apparent discrimination arising in the enjoyment of the rights and freedoms provided for in the Convention and 15 other international agreements listed in the Appendix to Annex 6 of the Dayton Peace Agreement.

== The applicants ==
The Chamber was receiving applications concerning such human rights violations directly from any Party to Annex 6 of the Dayton Peace Agreement or from any person, non-governmental organisation or group of individuals claiming to be the victim of a violation by any Party or acting on behalf of alleged victims who are deceased or missing.

== Jurisdiction of the Chamber ==
The Chamber was only receiving applications concerning matters which were within the responsibility of one of the Parties to Annex 6 (the State of Bosnia and Herzegovina, the Federation of Bosnia and Herzegovina, and the Republika Srpska), and which occurred or continued after entry into force of the Dayton Peace Agreement on 14 December 1995.

== The judges of the Chamber ==
The Chamber was composed of 14 judges (two panels of seven judges). Four members were appointed by the Federation of Bosnia and Herzegovina and two by the Republika Srpska. The remaining eight members were international members.

The President of the Chamber, Ms. Michèle Picard, a French national, was designated by the Committee of Ministers of the Council of Europe from among the international members. The members appointed were all distinguished lawyers and bring to the Chamber a wide variety of experience in different backgrounds including the judiciary, the academic sphere, private legal practice, administration and politics, and international, criminal and human rights law.

The composition of the Human Rights Chamber was:

1. Prof. Dr. Rona Aybay (Turkish)
2. Dr. Hasan Balić (Bosnian)
3. Mr. Mehmed Deković (Bosnian)
4. Prof. Dr. Giovanni Grasso (Italian)
5. Mr. Andrew William Grotrian (British)
6. Mr. Želimir Juka (Bosnian)
7. Prof.Dr. Viktor Masenko-Mavi (Hungarian)
8. Mr. Jakob Möller (Icelandic)
9. Prof. Dr. Manfred Nowak (Austrian)
10. Mr. Miodrag Pajić (Bosnian)
11. Ms. Michèle Picard (French)
12. Prof. Dr. Vitomir Popović (Bosnian)
13. Prof. Dr. Dietrich Rauschning (German)
14. Mr. Mato Tadić (Bosnian)

== The admissibility criterion ==
Under the terms of Annex 6 of the Dayton Peace Agreement, when the Chamber receives an application it must decide whether to accept or reject it, taking into account a number of criteria listed in Article VIII. These criteria include:

(a) whether effective remedies exist, and the applicant has demonstrated that they have been exhausted and that the application has been filed with the Chamber within six months from such date on which the final decision was taken; (b) whether the application is substantially the same as a matter that the Chamber has already examined; (c) whether the application is incompatible with the Human Rights Agreement, manifestly ill-founded, or an abuse of the right of petition; and (d) whether the application concerns a matter currently pending before another international human rights body or another Commission established by the Dayton Peace Agreement.

== The procedure of the Chamber ==
The Chamber’s procedures was modeled on those of the European Court of Human Rights. Unless the Chamber decides at the outset that an application is inadmissible or should be struck out, written observations are requested from the applicant and respondent Party, after which the Chamber deliberates and decides on a case. In addition to the written procedure, the Chamber may decide to schedule a public hearing for oral argument by the parties and submission of evidence by witnesses and experts. The Chamber may also invite written or oral amicus curiae submissions. If the Chamber finds a violation, it may, in its written decision on the merits, issue an order indicating the steps that the respondent Party must take to remedy the breach, including orders to cease and desist or grant monetary relief. At any stage of the proceedings, it may also order provisional measures or attempt to facilitate an amicable resolution based on respect for human rights.

== The implementation of the decisions ==
The decisions of the Chamber were final and binding and the respondent Parties are obligated to implement them fully. Chamber decisions on the merits are forwarded to the Organization for Security and Co-operation in Europe (OSCE) and the Office of the High Representative (OHR) for monitoring of compliance.

== The expiration of the mandate of the Chamber ==
According to the Agreement Pursuant to Article XIV of Annex 6 to the General Framework Agreement for Peace in Bosnia and Herzegovina entered into by the Parties on 22 and 25 September 2003, the Human Rights Chamber's mandate expired on 31 December 2003. This Agreement established the Human Rights Commission to operate between 1 January 2004 and 31 December 2004 within the Constitutional Court of Bosnia and Herzegovina. The Human Rights Commission has jurisdiction to consider pending cases received by the Human Rights Chamber on or before 31 December 2003; after 1 January 2004, new cases alleging human rights violations are to be decided by the Constitutional Court.
