= Hatidža =

Hatidža is a Bosnian feminine given name. Notable people with the name include:

- Hatidža Hadžiosmanović (1938–2015), Bosnian judge
- Hatidža Mehmedović (1952–2018), Bosnian human rights activist
