= Zhenis Kembayev =

Kazakh scholar

Jeñıs Mūhtarūly Kembaev (Note: Often transliterated as Zhenis Mukhtarovich Kembayev through a Russified Romanization of Женис Мухтарович Кембаев.) (Kazakh: Жеңіс Мұхтарұлы Кембаев; born 25 February 1975) is a Kazakh academic who's a professor of law at the KIMEP, Almaty, Kazakhstan.

== Education ==
Kembaev graduated with honors from the Al-Farabi Kazakh National University in 1997. The same year, he was awarded a scholarship of the German Academic Exchange Service (DAAD) for one-year academic study in Germany. In 1998, he obtained a Master of Law (LL.M, magna cum laude) degree from the University of Hamburg and in 2002, a Ph.D. degree in law from the Al-Farabi Kazakh National University.

From 2003 to 2004, he was a Fulbright scholar at the Southwestern University School of Law (Los Angeles, USA) and in 2007–2008 an Alexander von Humboldt Foundation fellow at the Europa-Institut of the University of Saarland (Saarbruecken, Germany) and at the Max Planck Institute for Comparative Public Law and International Law (Heidelberg, Germany).

In 2008, he earned his second doctorate in law (Dr. iur., magna cum laude) from the University of Cologne.

== Teaching and research career ==
Kembayev joined KIMEP in 2004 and teaches courses in Public International Law, Law of the European Union and Constitutional Law.

His research interests are connected with legal issues related to: (a) the regional integration processes within the Eurasian Economic Union and the Collective Security Treaty Organization; (b) the operation of the Shanghai Cooperation Organisation; (c) the EU constitutional and external relations law; and (d) constitutional law of Kazakhstan and comparative constitutional law.

Since 2015, Kembayev is a Jean Monnet Chair in European and International Law. From 2016 to 2017, he was selected as a Weiser and a Grotius Research Fellow at the University of Michigan and in 2018, a research fellow at the National University of Singapore.

He is the author of several books and is active in publishing in internationally recognized peer-review journals. He has presented papers at scores of legal conferences and public hearings around the world. Kembayev also serves on several advisory editorial boards, including Review of Central and East European Law and Osteuropa-Recht.
