= Faculty of Law, University of Sarajevo =

Law School of the University of Sarajevo

University of Sarajevo Faculty of Law
- Pravni fakultet Univerziteta u Sarajevu
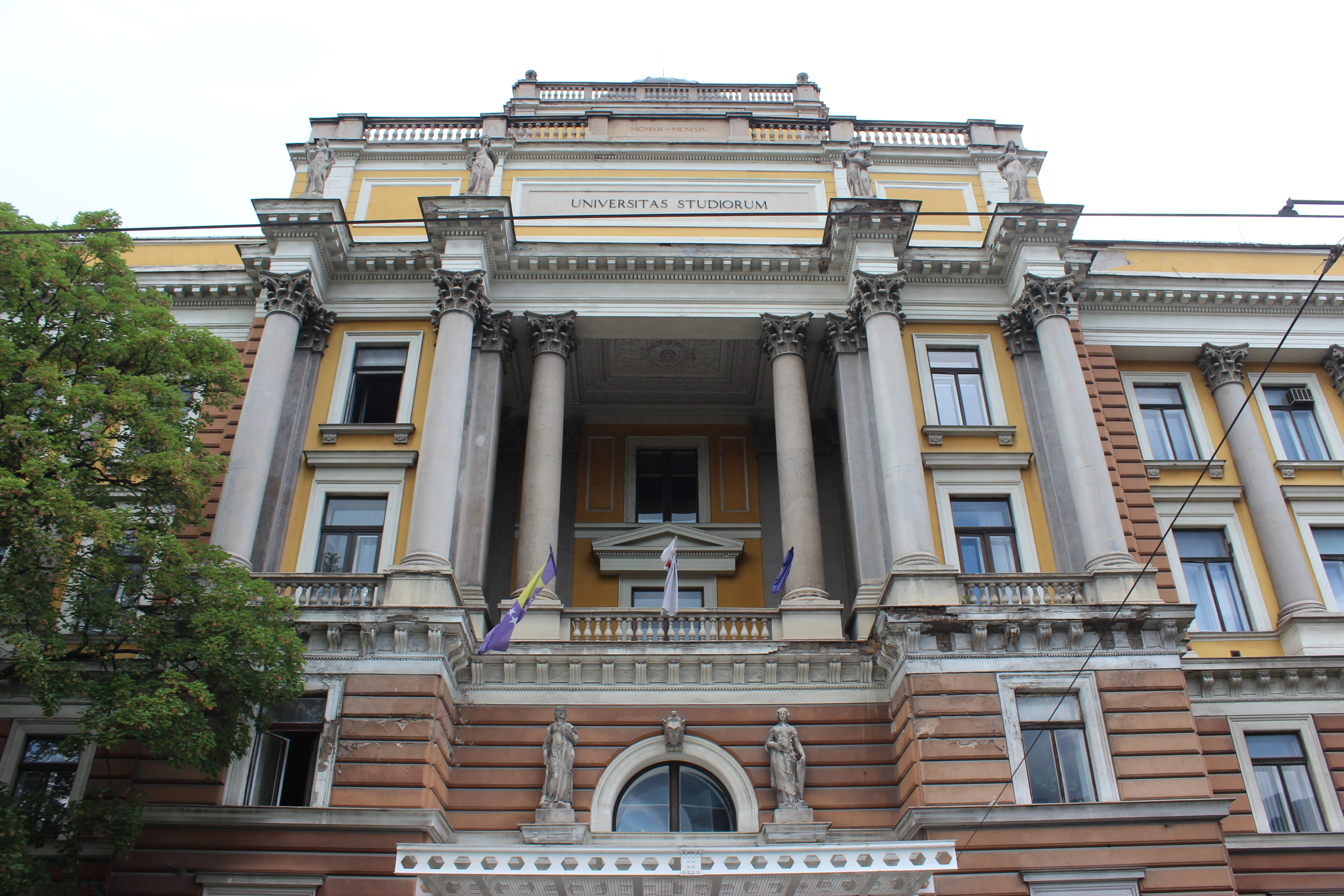
- Latin: Facultas Iuris Sarajevoensis
- Type: Public
- Established: 1946
- Dean: Zinka Grbo
- Location: Sarajevo, Bosnia and Herzegovina; 43°51′25″N 18°25′07″E
- Campus: Urban
- Website: pfsa.unsa.ba

The Faculty of Law of the University of Sarajevo (Bosnian: Pravni fakultet Univerziteta u Sarajevu), also known as the Sarajevo Law School, is one of the leading schools of the University of Sarajevo, Bosnia and Herzegovina. The school is located in Sarajevo's downtown district next to the Latin Bridge and not far from Baščaršija, the city's historical and cultural center.

== History ==
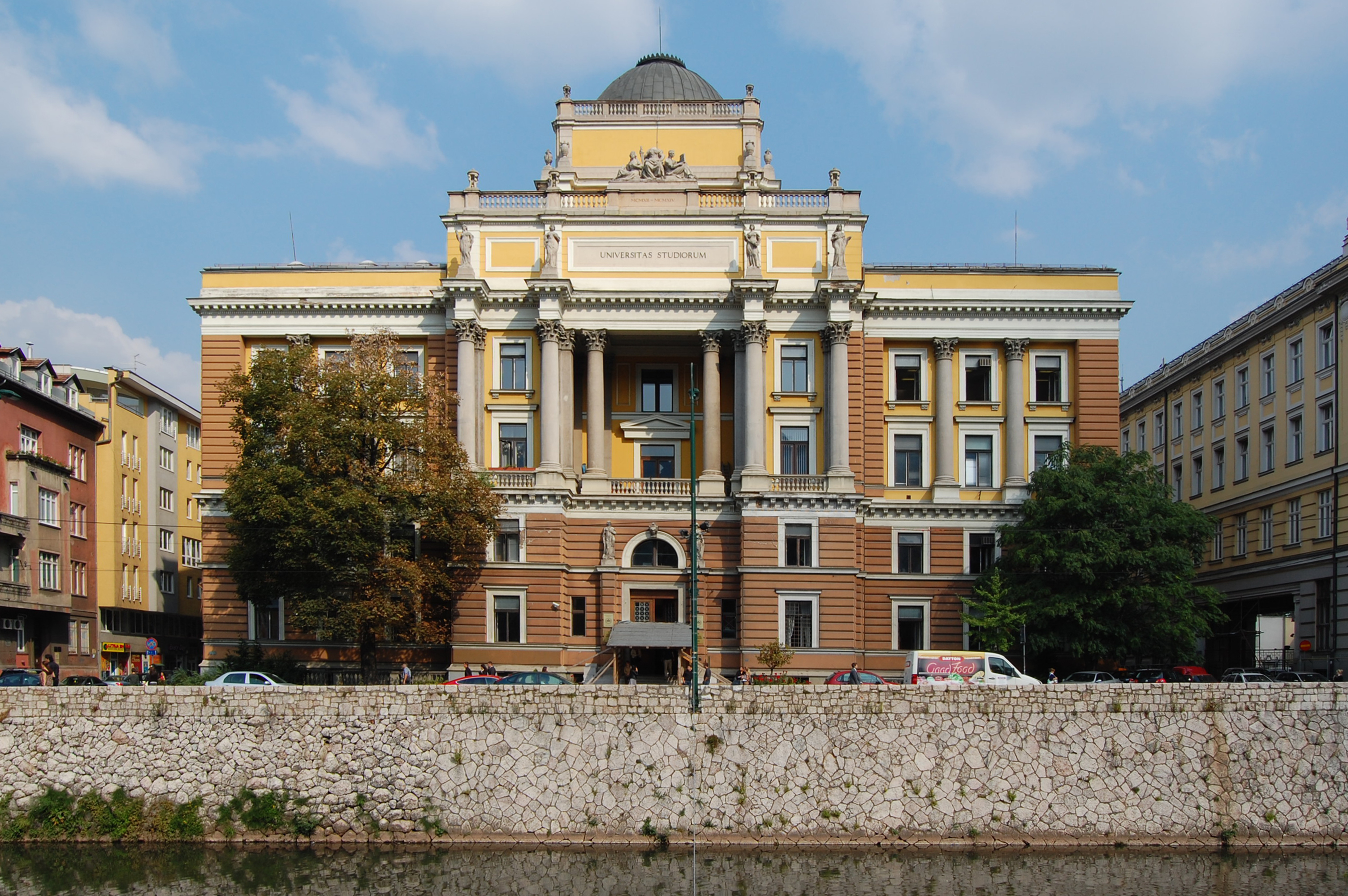
The Faculty of Law building, built in the 1850s

The Sarajevo Law School was founded through a legal act on 20 August 1946 and it became the first member of the University of Sarajevo. Mehmed Begović, a distinguished research professor at the University of Belgrade's Faculty of Law specializing in Yugoslav Sharia law was the driving power for establishing the school's program and organization (along with Gorazd Kušej from Ljubljana and Pavao Rastovčan from Zagreb). Russian lawyer and historian Alexander Soloviev served as the first Dean of the Sarajevo Law School from 1947 to 1949.

== Organization ==
The law school is divided into five chairs:

- Chair of State and International Public Law;
- Chair of Legal-Economic Sciences;
- Chair of Civil Law;
- Chair of Legal History and Comparative Law;
- Chair of Criminal Law.

== Degree programs ==
The Bachelor's program lasts four years carrying 240 ECTS credits. The Degree of Graduate lawyer was also offered for those who enrolled before the Bologna reform.

== Notable people ==
=== Alumni ===
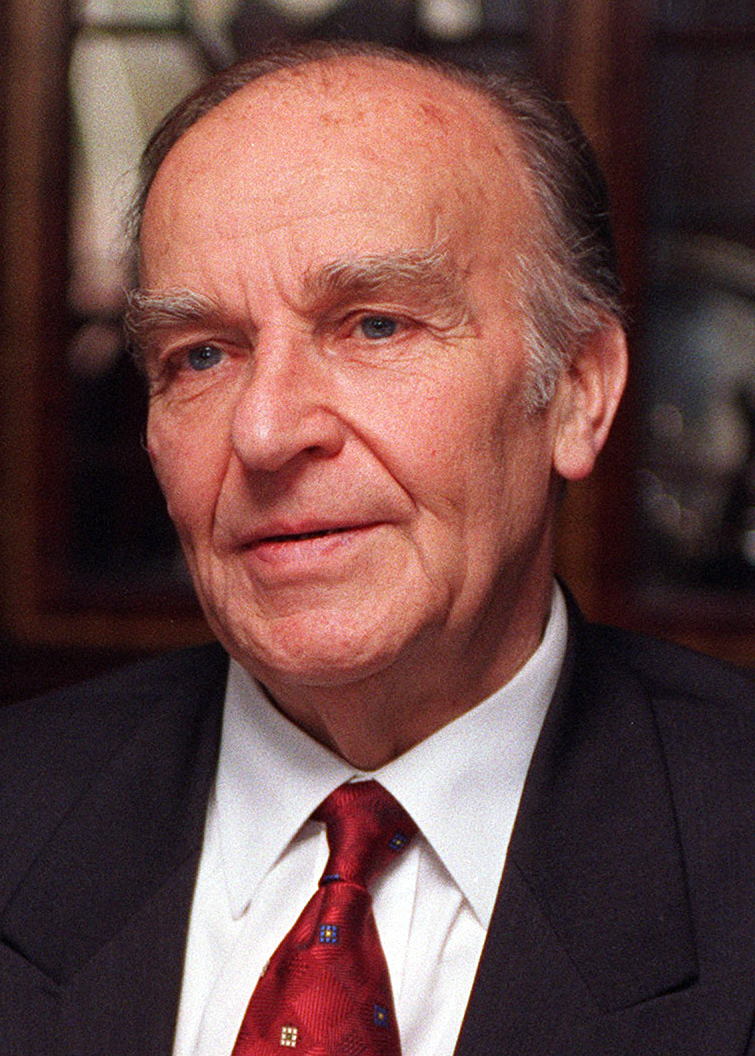
Alija Izetbegović

- Alija Izetbegović, first chairman of the Presidency of Bosnia and Herzegovina
- Benjamina Karić, current mayor of Sarajevo
- Bisera Turković, former foreign minister of Bosnia and Herzegovina
- Hatidža Hadžiosmanović, former president of the Constitutional Court of Bosnia and Herzegovina
- Jasmin Imamović, former mayor of Tuzla
- Krešimir Zubak, former member of the Presidency of Bosnia and Herzegovina
- Mario Nenadić, former Premier of Sarajevo Canton
- Mato Tadić, former president of the Constitutional Court of Bosnia and Herzegovina
- Mirko Šarović, former member of the Presidency of Bosnia and Herzegovina
- Radmila Hrustanović, former mayor of Belgrade
- Safet Isović, prominent sevdalinka singer
- Seada Palavrić, member of the Constitutional Court of Bosnia and Herzegovina
- Semiha Borovac, former mayor of Sarajevo
- Sredoje Nović, former minister of Civil Affairs and director of the State Investigation and Protection Agency
- Sulejman Tihić, former member of the Presidency of Bosnia and Herzegovina
- Šefik Džaferović, former member of the Presidency of Bosnia and Herzegovina
- Valerija Galić, president of the Constitutional Court of Bosnia and Herzegovina
- Zlatko Topčić, playwright and novelist
- Željko Komšić, member of the Presidency of Bosnia and Herzegovina

=== Faculty ===
- Vojislav Šešelj, former deputy Prime Minister of Serbia
- Zdravko Grebo, author and law professor
