= Zlatko M. Knežević =

Zlatko M. Knežević (born 1960 in Bosanski Novi) is a former judge of the Constitutional Court of Bosnia and Herzegovina.

== Biography ==
Knežević attended schools in Bosanski Novi and graduated from the University of Belgrade Faculty of Law; he passed the bar exam in Sarajevo in 1987.

Knežević worked shortly for the Sana company in Bosanski Novi, before starting his career: as an intern and law clerk at the Basic Court in Bosanski Novi, then in the administration of the municipality. Since end 1991 he worked as a private lawyer, as of 1996 in a joint attorney office in Novi Grad. He worked as a trainer for the state's Criminal Defense Section (OKO) and for international organisations such as OSCE and UNDP, in particular as regards criminal law, war crime cases and fundamental rights. He also published scientific articles on criminal law in domestic and foreign journals. Knežević was a member of the commission which drafted amendments to the Criminal Procedure Code of the Republika Srpska entity and the Law on free legal aid of Bosnia and Herzegovina.

Knežević served as president of the executive committee of the bar association of Republika Srpska, and was appointed to the High Judicial and Prosecutorial Council of Bosnia and Herzegovina.

On 1 July 2011 he was appointed a judge of the Constitutional Court of Bosnia and Herzegovina. Since 2013, he has been a member of the Venice Commission of the Council of Europe for Bosnia and Herzegovina, taking part in the work of the sub-commissions for judiciary system, fundamental rights and minority rights, of which he has also been deputy chairman.

On 31 May 2018, he was elected President of the Constitutional Court of Bosnia and Herzegovina. Knežević announced an early retirement from the court in June 2023.

He is fluent in English and Russian. He declared ethnic affiliation as a Bosnian Serb.
