= Giovanni Grassi (disambiguation) =

Giovanni Grassi may refer to:

- Giovanni Battista Grassi (1854–1925), Italian physician and zoologist
- Giovanni Antonio Grassi (1775–1849), Italian Jesuit and educator

== See also ==
- Giovanni Grasso, Italian actor
- Giovanni Grasso (judge), Italian judge
