= High Judicial and Prosecutorial Council of Bosnia and Herzegovina =

National council of the judiciary of Bosnia and Herzegovina

- Visoko sudsko i tužilačko vijeće BiH; VSTV BiH

Agency overview
- Formed: 2004; 22 years ago
- Jurisdiction: Council of Ministers of Bosnia and Herzegovina
- Headquarters: Sarajevo, Kraljice Jelene 88; 43.84475°N 18.36617°E
- Agency executive: Sanin Bogunić, President
- Website: vstv.pravosudje.ba

The High Judicial and Prosecutorial Council of Bosnia and Herzegovina (VSTV BiH) (Bosnian: Visoko sudsko i tužilačko vijeće Bosne i Hercegovine; Croatian: Visoko sudsko i tužiteljsko vijeće Bosne i Hercegovine; Serbian: Високи судски и тужилачки савјет Босне и Херцеговине) is the national council of the judiciary of Bosnia and Herzegovina. It is the self-regulatory body of the judiciary in the country, tasked with guaranteeing its independence, with countrywide competencies over the administration and career management of judicial office holders. It is based on the continental tradition of self-management of the judiciary.

The High Judicial and Prosecutorial Council of Bosnia and Herzegovina (VSTV) is the single managing body responsible for guaranteeing the independence of judges and the autonomy of prosecutors throughout the country and regulating their careers. The VSTV BiH appoints, promotes, and disciplines judges and prosecutors at all levels in the country, and is responsible for advising other levels of government about judicial budgets and administration. The VSTV was established in 2004, replacing entity-level judicial and prosecutorial councils, based on a transfer agreement from the entities, confirmed by the Constitutional Court. The Law on the High Judicial and Prosecutorial Council (VSTV) needs to be revised to better regulate the appointment, appraisal and disciplinary procedures of members of the judiciary, and provide appropriate legal remedies against final decisions of the VSTV, in line with European standards. It shares the same premises as the Court of Bosnia and Herzegovina, in Sarajevo's Otoka district.

== History ==
The VSTV is not mentioned in the Constitution of Bosnia and Herzegovina. It was established by law in 2004, replacing entity-level judicial and prosecutorial councils, based on an agreement on the transfer of certain competencies from the entities to the State in the area of the judiciary. In 2009 the Constitutional Court of Bosnia and Herzegovina held that the VSTV had been established in conformity with the Constitution. However, the Republika Srpska entity has not repealed the conflicting provisions of its Constitution providing for an entity-level VSTV.

== Composition ==
The VSTV is composed of 15 members with a four-year mandate, renewable once. Of these, 11 members represent various judicial and prosecutorial structures and are elected by their peers from among " persons of high moral standing and integrity", with "a reputation for efficiency, competence and integrity", according to the law. The other four members represent non-judicial bodies: two are elected by entities’ bar associations among their members, one by the Council of Ministers and one by Parliament. The VSTV members elect its president and two vice presidents. Of the 15 VSTV members, 9 are women (2019).

Despite the legal provisions, several members of the VSTV have been considered to be close to politicians in power. In particular, VSTV presidents Milorad Novković (2008-2014) and Milan Tegeltija (2014-2020) are considered very close to SNSD leader Milorad Dodik. In 2005, Dodik faced trial for misuse of public funds; prosecutors were Milan Tegeltija and Zoran Lipovac, while Milorad Novković was chair of the judge panel; Dodik was acquitted by the Court. While Novković and Tegeltija were later chosen to head the VSTV, Lipovac was appointed judge to the RS Constitutional Court judge.

=== Presidents of the VSTV BiH ===
- Branko Perić (2004–2008), judge of the Court of Bosnia and Herzegovina;
- Milorad Novković (2008–2014); President of the Banja Luka District Court;
- Milan Tegeltija (2014–2021); President of the Banja Luka Basic Court; resigned after corruption scandals in 2019 and 2020. Vice-presidents: Ružica Jukić, Jadranka Lokmić-Misirača.
- Halil Lagumdžija (2021–2025); President of the Court of Bosnia and Herzegovina
- Sanin Bogunić (2025–present)

== Tasks ==
The VSTV is primarily in charge of appointing all judicial office holders in the country, including the judicial associates in the municipal courts of the Federation entity. It also takes part in the selection procedure for judges in the entity's constitutional courts, notably by interviewing candidates and proposing a ranking of candidates to the entity parliaments. It sets also criteria for the evaluation of the performance of judges and prosecutors by the respective court presidents and chief prosecutors. The VSTV issues codes of ethics supervises the judicial and prosecutorial training centres in the entities (including deciding on minimum training needs and induction training) and provides information and communication technology services to all courts and prosecutors’ offices. Its Office of the Disciplinary Prosecutor is tasked with overseeing judges and prosecutors. The VSTV appoints separate disciplinary commissions to hear first and second-instance disciplinary cases. In plenary, it acts as a third instance in disciplinary proceedings. A Secretariat was established to support the professional, financial and administrative work of the VSTV.

== Reform ==
As a key priority from the 2019 Commission Opinion on the EU membership application of the country, Bosnia and Herzegovina needs to adopt the new Law on the VSTV based on the 2018 legislative initiative to strengthen the independence and accountability of the VSTV as a guarantor of the independence of the judiciary. This law should align with European Standards regarding the VSTV's composition, the election and disciplinary responsibility of its members, as well as reform the appointment, promotion, performance appraisal, disciplinary responsibility, conflict of interests and integrity of judicial office holders, and establish a judicial remedy against all VSTV' final decisions. These issues need to be addressed in light of the European Commission's recommendations and the findings of the Expert Report on the Rule of Law issues ("Priebe Report"). The final draft law should be submitted to the Venice Commission for an opinion, before adoption.

The Law on the VSTV has several deficiencies concerning judicial appointments, performance appraisal, disciplinary procedures, conflict of interest and declaration of assets. Moreover, it does not provide for the right to an effective legal remedy against final decisions of the VSTV, except for the dismissal of judges and prosecutors. To align the Law on the VSTV with European standards, in its related opinions10 issued in 2012 and 2014 the Venice Commission recommended in particular to: (i) improve the rules on selecting the VSTV members; (ii) establish two sub-councils, for judges and prosecutors respectively; (iii) avoid setting quotas along ethnic lines as they may undermine the effective functioning of the system; and (iv) avoid an increased risk of politicisation of appointment procedures.

In the context of the Structured Dialogue on Justice, the European Commission recommended stepping up the level of independence and accountability of the judiciary by addressing shortcomings, particularly concerning appointments, integrity and disciplinary matters. It also recommended significantly improving the quality criteria in performance appraisal. In June 2018, the VSTV submitted to the BiH Ministry of Justice a legislative initiative to amend the Law on the VSTV to comply with those recommendations. The BiH Ministry of Justice has yet to finalise a consolidated draft law and submit it for legislative initiative to the BiH Council of Ministers.

Within the current legislative framework, several rules were adopted in 2018-19 by the VSTV based on its self-regulatory powers. They aim to address some deficiencies of the judiciary, in particular regarding the criteria for the appointment and performance appraisal of judges and prosecutors. A 2018-20 VSTV action plan is in place, covering most notably measures to strengthen the fight against organised crime and corruption, by strengthening the autonomy of the main actors in the criminal procedure chain, improving the quality of financial investigations, increasing the impact of assets seizure and improving the courts’ sentencing policy, including on sentences according to plea bargain agreements. However, the implementation of some reforms decided by the VSTV, notably on integrity and efficiency, has met resistance from within the judiciary in particular concerning the declaration of assets and performance appraisal. There is also a need to ensure a better distribution of human resources throughout the judiciary and to improve judicial transparency through better interaction with media and society.

The Republika Srpska entity also adopted some amendments to its law on courts regarding the appointment of judges, thus legislating on a matter that had been transferred from the entity to the State by the transfer agreement. Despite commitments taken in the context of the Structured Dialogue on Justice since 2012, the Republika Srpska entity has not yet amended its legislation to render it compatible with the Law on VSTV. The Republika Srpska entity Law on the public prosecution service is equally incompatible with the state-level legislation as regards the conditions for the appointments of prosecutors.

To strengthen the role of the VSTV as a guarantor of the independence of the judiciary, the VSTV also needs to be provided with an explicit constitutional status, including clear rules on its composition and powers.
