= Mirsad Ćeman =

Bosnian lawyer, judge and politician

Mirsad Ćeman (born 1955 in Miljanovci, Tešanj) is a Bosnian lawyer, politician and chief judge of the Constitutional Court of Bosnia and Herzegovina.

== Biography ==
Ćeman graduated in Law from the University of Banja Luka in 1979, working then for the legal service of the Municipality of Tešanj. From 1982 to 1990 he headed the legal service of Energoinvest's "Enker" company in Tešanj. From 1991 to 1993 he also chaired the executive board of Tešanj Municipality.

From 1990 until 2006 Ćeman was a member of parliament for the Bosniak Party of Democratic Action in the assembly of the Socialist Republic of Bosnia and Herzegovina, then Republic of Bosnia and Herzegovina and later Bosnia and Herzegovina, taking part in parliamentary committees on constitutional affairs. From 1996 to 1998 he was a Bosniak delegate for SDA in the House of Peoples of Bosnia and Herzegovina. From 2000 to 2002 he represented the Zenica-Doboj North constituency in the Federation entity's House of Representatives. Then, from 2002 to 2006, he was a member of the State-level House of Representatives representing the Zenica-Doboj and Central Bosnia constituency.

Ćeman passed the bar exam in Sarajevo in 1998. From 2007 he practiced as a lawyer and authorised mediator in Sarajevo. As a consultant, he was engaged in the drafting of multiple systemic laws and regulations; he also co-authored a law-drafting manual.

In 2008, Ćeman was appointed as a judge of the Constitutional Court of Bosnia and Herzegovina; he served as president of the court from 2015 to 2018, and was then elected vice-president in 2018. In May 2025, he was appointed for a second term as president of the court.

He filed dissenting opinions on Constitutional Court decisions, including on U-15/09 and on U-15/08.
