= Mato Tadić =

Mato Tadić (born 15 August 1952 in Vuksic, Brčko) is a former judge of the Constitutional Court of Bosnia and Herzegovina. He declared ethnic affiliation as a Bosnian Croat.

== Biography ==
Tadić graduated from the Sarajevo Law School and began his career with the Basic Public Prosecutor's Office in Brčko, first as a law-clerk and, after passing the bar exam in 1978, as deputy public prosecutor and then public prosecutor.

In 1991, Tadić was appointed as deputy public prosecutor of the Republic of Bosnia and Herzegovina. He remained in that position until the outbreak of war. During the war, he remained shortly on the Brčko front and then in 1993 he moved to Orašje. At the beginning of 1994, he left for Mostar and afterward to Sarajevo where he served as minister of justice within the government of the Republic and then the Federation of Bosnia and Herzegovina until the end of 1998. He took part in the peace talks at Dayton, Ohio which led to the Dayton Peace Agreement. Under his lead, the criminal code and criminal procedure code of the Federation entity were reformed in 1998–99 with international support. Around 1998 Tadić was deemed close to the short-lived New Croatian Initiative party founded by Krešimir Zubak to contrast nationalist HDZ BiH.

In June 1999, Tadić was appointed as a member (judge) of the Human Rights Chamber for Bosnia and Herzegovina and, in 2003, he was elected both vice-president and president of the second panel of the Human Rights Chamber.

In 2002, he was appointed judge of the Constitutional Court of Bosnia and Herzegovina. From May 2003 through to June 2006, he served as first president of the Constitutional Court. In 2015, he was appointed as vicepresident of the Constitutional Court.

In 2006 Tadić was indicted for corruption; as the State Prosecutor's Office did not provide the court with any detail on the accusations, the court decided not to suspend nor dismiss him. He was finally acquitted.

Tadić has published various texts on criminal and constitutional law, administration and local self-government, and topics relating to the European Convention of Human Rights and Fundamental Freedoms. He has also been a lecturer for the state's Criminal Defence Section (OKO) and for the OSCE Mission to BiH and a participant of numerous national and international conferences.
