= Constitutional Court of the Federation of Bosnia and Herzegovina =

Jurisdiction body in Bosnia and Herzegovina

Constitutional Court of the Federation of Bosnia and Herzegovina Ustavni sud Federacije Bosne i Hercegovine Уставни суд Федерације Босне и Херцеговине
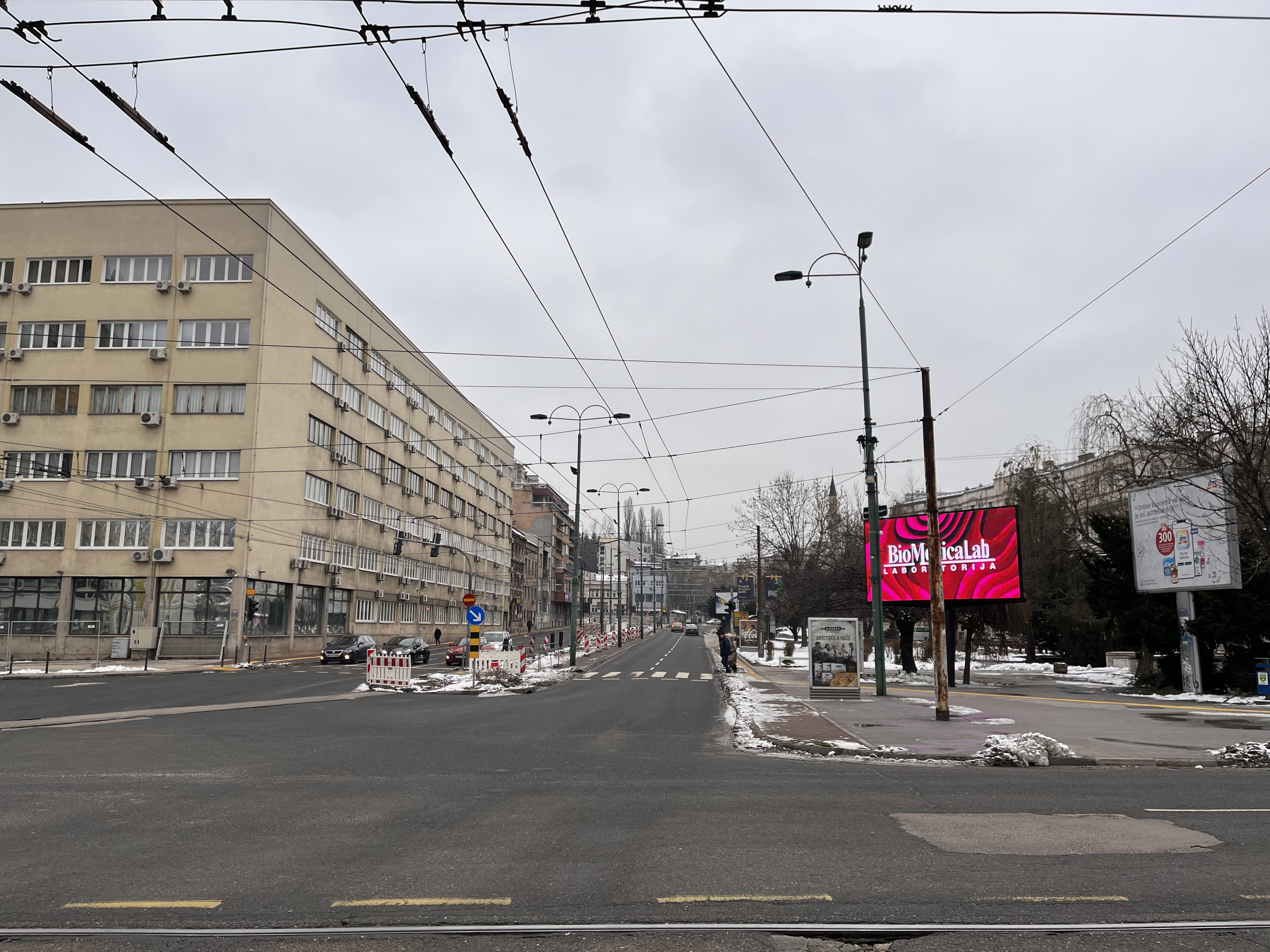
- The building seen along the left edge of the photo is the Federal Constitutional Court
- Interactive map of Constitutional Court of the Federation of Bosnia and Herzegovina; Ustavni sud Federacije Bosne i Hercegovine; Уставни суд Федерације Босне и Херцеговине
- 43.856571053179614°N 18.412703173531092°E
- Established: 1994
- Jurisdiction: Bosnia and Herzegovina
- Location: Sarajevo
- Coordinates: 43.856571053179614°N 18.412703173531092°E
- Authorised by: Constitution of the Federation of Bosnia and Herzegovina
- Website: ustavnisudfbih.ba

President
- Currently: Vesna Budimir

Constitutional Court of the Federation of Bosnia and Herzegovina (Serbo-Croatian: Ustavni sud Federacije Bosne i Hercegovine) was established by the Constitution of the Federation of Bosnia and Herzegovina entity in Bosnia and Herzegovina, which guarantees its respect and implementation. It functions alongside the state-wide Constitutional Court of Bosnia and Herzegovina and the corresponding subnational Constitutional Court of Republika Srpska.

The operation is based on the provisions of the Constitution of the Federation and the Law on Procedure before the Constitutional Court of the Federation of Bosnia and Herzegovina. Its seat is in Sarajevo.

== History ==
It was established on March 30, 1994, at the session of the Parliament of the Federation of Bosnia and Herzegovina. With the Article IV.C.1.1. (2) of the Federation Constitution, the courts of the Federation of Bosnia and Herzegovina were established, namely: Constitutional Court of the Federation of Bosnia and Herzegovina, Supreme Court of the Federation of Bosnia and Herzegovina, and Court for Human Rights of the Federation of Bosnia and Herzegovina. The provisions of the Constitution prescribe the composition, jurisdiction, persons authorized to submit requests, as well as the effect of the decisions of the Constitutional Court, the basic rights and obligations of the parties in proceedings before that institution.

Article IX c) of the Constitution stipulates that for the first five years after its entry into force, three judges of the Constitutional Court of the Federation, who will be foreigners and who are not citizens of any neighboring country, will be appointed by the President of the International Court of Justice after consultation with the President and Vice President of the Federation of Bosnia and Herzegovina. Milan Bajić, Mirko Bošković, Muamer Herceglija, Omer Ibrahimagić, Katarina Mandić and Draško Vuleta were appointed as the first domestic judges on September 30, 1994, and their appointment was confirmed by the Constituent Assembly (i.e.. Federal Parliament) at its session on November 9 of that same year. Local judges were sworn in on the same day. Three foreign judges, Bola Ajibola, Abdalah Fikri al-Hani and François Rigaux, were appointed on 22 February 1995, when the Constitutional Court of the Federation was finally completed. The constituent session of the Constitutional Court was held on January 10, 1996, and the first president of the Constitutional Court was Omer Ibrahimagić.

As originally stipulated, an equal number of judges came from Bosniak and Bosnian Croat nations, with a proportional representation of judges from other nations. After the constitutional amendments of 2002, the Council for the Protection of Vital National Interests was established, as the final authority in deciding on matters of vital national interests of the constituent peoples. The amendments also stipulate that at least two judges must be from each constituent nation and one from among others.
