= Margarita Caca-Nikolovska =

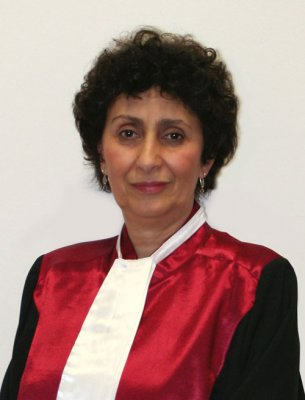

Judge of the Constitutional Court of Bosnia and Herzegovina
- In office 2011–2020
- Succeeded by: Helen Keller

Personal details
- Born: 1950 (age 75–76) Skopje, SFRJ
- Education: University of Skopje
- Profession: Judge

Margarita Caca-Nikolovska (born 1950 in Skopje) is a Macedonian judge, serving as international judge of the Constitutional Court of Bosnia and Herzegovina.

== Biography ==
Caca-Nikolovska graduated from the St. Kiril i Metodije Law Faculty of the University of Skopje; she passed the bar exam in 1977 and then served as law clerk in the Skopje Regional Court. In 1978 she was appointed judge at the first municipal court in Skopje, in 1987 at the Skopje regional court (later renamed Skopje Court of Appeals), working mainly on civil law cases.

In 1994 Caca-Nikolovska served as president of the Commission for parliamentary elections. In 1997–1998 Caca-Nikolovska served as judge at the Supreme Court of the Republic of Macedonia, then until 2018 as judge from the Republic of Macedonia to the European Court of Human Rights.

She served in multiple professional organisations and human rights organisations, including the Macedonian Judges Association (1994–1998), which she represented at the European and International Association of Judges (1995–2006); the Civil Association Institute for Human Rights in the Republic of Macedonia; the Macedonian Open Society Foundations (2010–2014) and the Helsinki Committee for Human Rights of Macedonia (since 2011). She has been a lecturer at multiple trainings and conferences on European human rights law and has published several scientific articles on human rights and fundamental freedoms.

Caca-Nikolovska was appointed by the ECtHR president as international judge of the Constitutional Court of Bosnia and Herzegovina in 2011 and elected vice-president of the court in 2015. She served until age 70 in 2020.
