= Andreas Zünd =

Swiss jurist and judge at the European Court of Human Rights

Judge at the European Court of Human Rights
- Incumbent
- Assumed office 2021
- Succeeded by: Helen Keller

Federal Judge of Switzerland
- In office 2003–2021

Personal details
- Born: Andreas Zünd; 8 February 1957 (age 69) St. Gallen, Switzerland
- Citizenship: Swiss
- Party: Social Democratic Party of Switzerland

Andreas Zünd (born 8 February 1957) is a Swiss jurist who has served as a judge at the European Court of Human Rights since 2021.

== Education ==
Zünd studied law at the University of Bern from where he obtained a licentiate in 1982 and doctorate in 1986.

== Professional career ==
After graduation he became a court clerk at the Higher Court of Argovia for a year before he assumed the same duty at the Swiss Federal Court in Lausanne between 1987 until 1996. Besides he acted as the substitute judge for the high court in Argovia between 1987 and 2002 before he assumed as an ordinary Judge at the same court from 2002 to 2004. Concordantly he also acted as a part-time judge at the Federal Court of Switzerland from 1996 to 2004 before he was elected a Federal Judge in Dezember 2003 as the successor of Martin Schubarth.

=== Federal Judge of Switzerland ===
As a Swiss Federal Judge he was involved in several notable cases of public law like the transfer of date from thousands of UBS bank account holders to the French authorities. In Switzerland judges are members of a political party for which Switzerland was often criticized by the Council of Europe. He is a member of the left-wing Social Democratic Party of Switzerland (SP).

=== Judge at the European Court of Human Rights ===
In January 2021 he was elected a Judge of the European Court of Human Rights by the Parliamentary Assembly of the Council of Europe(PACE). He is the sixth judge representing Switzerland at the ECHR and only the second Swiss Federal judge to assumed as a judge at the ECHR.
