= 5th electoral unit of the House of Representatives of the Federation of Bosnia and Herzegovina =

Parliamentary constituency

5th electoral unit
- House of Representatives of the Federation of Bosnia and Herzegovina constituency
- Electoral unit within the Federation of Bosnia and Herzegovina

Current constituency
- Created: 2000
- Seats: 12 (2000-2002); 8 (2002-present)

The fifth electoral unit of the Federation of Bosnia and Herzegovina is a parliamentary constituency used to elect members to the House of Representatives of the Federation of Bosnia and Herzegovina since 2000. Located within Zenica-Doboj Canton, it consists of the municipalities of Doboj Jug, Maglaj, Tešanj, Usora, Zavidovići, Zenica, and Žepče.

== Demographics ==
Ethnicity	Population	%
Bosniaks	202,112	79.6
Croats	36,906	14.5
Serbs	4,589	1.8
Did Not declare	1,786	0.7
Others	8,171	3.2
Unknown	255	0.1
Total	253,819	

== Representatives ==
Convocation	Representatives											
2000-2002	Šemsudin Mehmedović (SDA)	Mirsad Hasagić (SDA)	Mirsad Ćeman (SDA)	Bedrudin Salčinović (SDA)	Nura Subašić (SDA)	Mato Zovko (HDZ)	Hamzalija Bešlagić (SDP)	Tarik Kapidžić (SBiH)	Salih Brkić (SDP)	Aida Mirićanac (SDP)	Muhamed Bajramović (SDP)	Ekrem Ajanović (SBiH)
2002-2006	Šemsudin Mehmedović (SDA)	Mirsad Hasagić (SDA)	Nermina Kapetanović (SDA)	Emina Ajanović (SDA)	Zahid Crnkić (SDA)	Josip Pojavnik (HDZ)	Hamzalija Bešlagić (SDP)	Mersija Krzić (SBiH)	8 seats			
2006-2010	Nedžad Polić (SDA)	Jasmin Duvnjak (SDA)	Nermina Kapetanović (SDA)	Safet Brdarević (SBiH)	Muhidin Alić (SBiH)	Ibro Omerbašić (BPS)	Miralem Unkić (SDP)	Mersija Krzić (SBiH)	8 seats			
2010-2014	Omer Škaljo (SDA)	Jasmin Duvnjak (SDA)	Aida Brčić (SDP)	Elvir Karajbić (SDP)	Muhidin Alić (SBiH)	Josip Martić (HDZ)	Senad Subašić (SDP)	Nasir Beganović (SBB)	8 seats			
2014-2018	Omer Škaljo (SDA)	Ibrahim Šišić (SDA)	Halid Muhić (SDA)	Elvir Karajbić (SDP)	Alma Kratina (DF)	Josip Martić (HDZ)	Anela Šestić-Begović (SBB)	Nasir Beganović (SBB)	8 seats			
2018-2022	Miralem Galijašević (SDA)	Suad Kaknjo (SDA)	Belma Pojskić (SDA)	Elvir Karajbić (SDP)	Alma Kratina (DF)	Josip Martić (HDZ)	Senaid Begić (SDP)	Eldin Vrače (NB)	8 seats			
2022-2026	Miralem Galijašević (SDA)	Nezir Pivić (SDA)	Adisa Kokić-Hinović (SDA)	Elvir Karajbić (SDP)	Alma Kratina (DF)	Josip Martić (HDZ)	Arnel Isak (NES)	Kenan Uzunović (BHI)	8 seats			
2026-2030	Suad Huskić (SDA)	Nezir Pivić (SDA)	Emira Drnda-Čičeklić (SDA)	Elvir Karajbić (SDP)	Alma Kratina (DF)	Goran Jurić (HDZ)	Hasan Handžić (SBiH)	Elmin Šabanović (BHI)	8 seats			
