= Review of Central and East European Law =

- Discipline: Law
- Language: English
- Edited by: Joseph Marko

Publication details
- Former name(s): Review of Socialist Law
- History: 1975–present
- Publisher: Brill Publishers
- Frequency: Quarterly
- Impact factor: 0.667 (2016)

Standard abbreviations
- ISO 4: Rev. Cent. East Eur. Law

Indexing
- ISSN: 0925-9880 (print); 1573-0352 (web)
- LCCN: 92641627

Links
- Journal homepage

Review of Central and East European Law (RCEEL) is a quarterly peer-reviewed academic journal covering research on legal doctrine and practice in Central and Eastern Europe. It was established in 1975 under the name Review of Socialist Law and it was renamed to Review of Central and East European Law in 1991. It is published by Brill. The editor-in-chief is Joseph Marko of Karl-Franzens-Universität Graz. Aiste Mickonyte and Benedikt Harzl serve as managing editors. The journal is published in cooperation with the University of Graz, University of Tartu, and Leiden University.

According to the Journal Citation Reports, the journal has a 2016 impact factor of 0.667. It is also indexed by Scopus with 2016 CiteScore 0.39, SCImago Journal Rank 0.215, and Source normalized impact per paper (SNIP) 0.931.
