= Seada Palavrić =

Bosnian lawyer, politician and judge

Member of the Constitutional Court of Bosnia and Herzegovina
- Retired
- In office December 2005 – May 2025
- Appointed by: Federation entity parliament

Seada Palavrić (born 10 November 1954 in Tuzla) is a Bosnian lawyer, politician, judge, and a retired member of the Constitutional Court of Bosnia and Herzegovina. She declared ethnic affiliation as Bosniak.

== Biography ==
Palavrić graduated from the Sarajevo Law School in 1984 and passed the bar exam in 1995.

In the 1980s, Palavrić worked as legal consultant for the Thermoelectric Power Plant Tuzla. From 1993 to 2002, she was appointed District Labour Inspector and a Secretary of the Tuzla District Assembly.

In 1994, she chaired the establishing committee of the Tuzla-Podrinje Canton as the first canton in the Federation of Bosnia and Herzegovina. From 1994 to 2002 she was Secretary of the cantonal assembly and the served as cantonal public attorney.

She also held the position of Assistant to the Minister of Justice of the Federation of Bosnia and Herzegovina and of liaison officer of the Federation entity government to the Human Rights Commission for Bosnia and Herzegovina and Ombudsman.

From 1996 to 2002, Palavrić was elected to the Federation entity's House of Representatives and from 2002 to 2005 to the State-level House of Representatives. She was Deputy Chairman of the Committee on Foreign Affairs and from 2001, she was vice president of the Bosniak Party of Democratic Action (SDA).

On 6 December 2005, she was appointed by the Federation entity parliament as a judge of the Constitutional Court of Bosnia and Herzegovina. In 2008, she was selected by her colleagues to serve as President of the court for a term. From 2009 to 2015 she served as vice-president of the court, and in June 2024 was appointed to another term as president of the court.

Palavrić was a member of the expert team involved in the Dobrinja Arbitration in accordance with the Decision of the High Representative, and a member of the High Representative's Commission for Amendments to the Constitution of Bosnia and Herzegovina, established after the adoption of the Constitutional Court's decision on the constituent peoples. She has published numerous professional articles in Pravni savjetnik, issued by the Civil Society Promotion Centre.

Palavrić retired from the court in May 2025, after her term expired due to reaching retirement age.
