= Helen Keller (judge) =

Swiss lawyer and international judge (born 1964)

Judge of the Constitutional Court of Bosnia and Herzegovina
- Incumbent
- Assumed office 4 December 2020
- Preceded by: Margarita Caca-Nikolovska

Judge of the European Court of Human Rights in respect of Switzerland
- In office 4 October 2011 – October 2020
- Succeeded by: Andreas Zünd

Personal details
- Born: 1 June 1964 (age 62) Winterthur, Switzerland
- Education: University of Zurich
- Profession: Professor of Law

Helen Keller (born 1 June 1964 in Winterthur) is a Swiss lawyer and international judge. She is a professor of law at the University of Zurich.

== Biography ==
After studying law at the University of Zurich, Helen Keller was an assistant at the chairs of Alfred Kölz and Heribert Rausch. At the latter, she completed her doctorate in 1993 with a dissertation on environmental constitutional law, for which she was awarded the Professor Walther Hug Prize. She received an LL.M. degree at the College of Europe in Bruges.

During her time as senior assistant at the University of Zurich (1996–2002) she wrote her habilitation thesis (“Reception of International Law”) and was the project manager of a multi-volume commentary on the Environmental Protection Act. After a research stay at the Max Planck Institute for Comparative Public Law and International Law, she was appointed to the University of Lucerne in 2002, where she is permanent visiting professor. Two years later, she was offered the full chair for public law, European and international law in Zurich.

In 2005 Helen Keller was elected by the UN General Assembly to succeed Walter Kälin on the United Nations Human Rights Committee (re-elected in 2010).

In 2011 Keller was appointed for a 9-year term as judge of the European Court of Human Rights in respect of Switzerland.

In 2020 Helen Keller took a position as international judge at the Constitutional Court of Bosnia and Herzegovina.

She is a board member of the Swiss section of the International Commission of Jurists.

Helen Keller is married and has two sons. She speaks English, French, German, Italian, and Polish.
