= Hatidža Hadžiosmanović =

Bosnian politician

Hatidža Hadžiosmanović (19 August 1938 – 23 December 2015) was a Bosnian judge, member and president of the Constitutional Court of Bosnia and Herzegovina.

== Biography ==
Hadžiosmanović was born in Sarajevo and graduated from the Sarajevo Law School in 1962. She passed the bar exam in 1967. From 1957 to 1967, she headed the legal office of the Sarajevo Tobacco Factory.

She has held office as a judge of various regular courts: Municipal Court I Sarajevo (1967–71); District Court of Sarajevo (currently Cantonal Court of Sarajevo) (1972–88); the Supreme Court of the Socialist Republic of Bosnia and Herzegovina from 1988 to 1992; the Supreme Court of the Republic of Bosnia and Herzegovina in 1992–1995, and then the Supreme Court of the Federation of Bosnia and Herzegovina. On 30 June 2002, she was appointed by the Federation entity parliament as judge of the Constitutional Court of Bosnia and Herzegovina. In June 2006 she was appointed President of the Constitutional Court of Bosnia and Herzegovina. She retired at age 70 in 2008.

Hadžiosmanović-Mahić dedicated her entire professional career to the law and its theoretical and practical application in economy as well as dealing with first-instance, second-instance, appellate, cassation and constitutional judicature. She died on 23 December 2015, aged 77, in Sarajevo.
