= Giovanni Grasso (judge) =

Italian judge

Giovanni Grasso (born 25 April 1950 in Catania) is an Italian judge, serving as international judge of the Constitutional Court of Bosnia and Herzegovina from 2016 to 2020.

== Biography ==
Grasso graduated in Law with honours from the University of Catania in November 1972. From 1976 to 1986 he served as judge - first as investigating judge at the Court of Milan, and then at the legislative office of the Italian Ministry of Justice, dealing with criminal law reform initiatives. Since 1986 he is full professor of criminal law at the University of Catania, also teaching European criminal law. He has authored a large number of scientific works in criminal law and european criminal law.

From March 1996 to December 2003 Grasso served as a member (judge) of the Human Rights Chamber for Bosnia and Herzegovina, also presiding the second panel and being vice-president of the Chamber from December 1998 to December 2002.

In 2016, the ECtHR President Guido Raimondi appointed him as Judge of the Constitutional Court of Bosnia and Herzegovina. He retired in 2020 upon reaching the age of 70.
