= Valerija Galić =

Bosnian judge

Valerija Galić (born 13 October 1956 in Split) is a Bosnian judge, former president and current vicepresident of the Constitutional Court of Bosnia and Herzegovina.

== Biography ==
Born in Split, Galić attended the First High School in Sarajevo and graduated from the Sarajevo Law School in 1981. The same year she started working as a law clerk with the Secretariat for Legislation of the then Executive Council of the Assembly of the Socialist Republic of Bosnia and Herzegovina. She then conducted judicial practice at First Municipal Court of Sarajevo and passed the bar exam in 1982. She was employed as a law assistant, then advisor and assistant secretary in charge of legislation of the Executive Council of the Government of the Republic of Bosnia and Herzegovina until 1996, when she was appointed as the Secretary of the Office for Legislation of the Government of the Federation of Bosnia and Herzegovina. She attended trainings by USAID and by the ECtHR, and served as law examiner for public employees. In 1999 she was a member of the Commission for Harmonization of Legal System with the European legislation.

On 30 July 2002 she was appointed judge of the Constitutional Court of Bosnia and Herzegovina, taking up office in February 2003. From 2006 to 2012 she served twice as the Vice-President of the Court, before being appointed President from 2012 to 2015, and again for a second term in August 2022.

She is a co-author and reviewer of several professional publications and participated in several national and international conferences on constitutional judiciary and the protection of human rights and fundamental freedoms.
