= Joseph Marko =

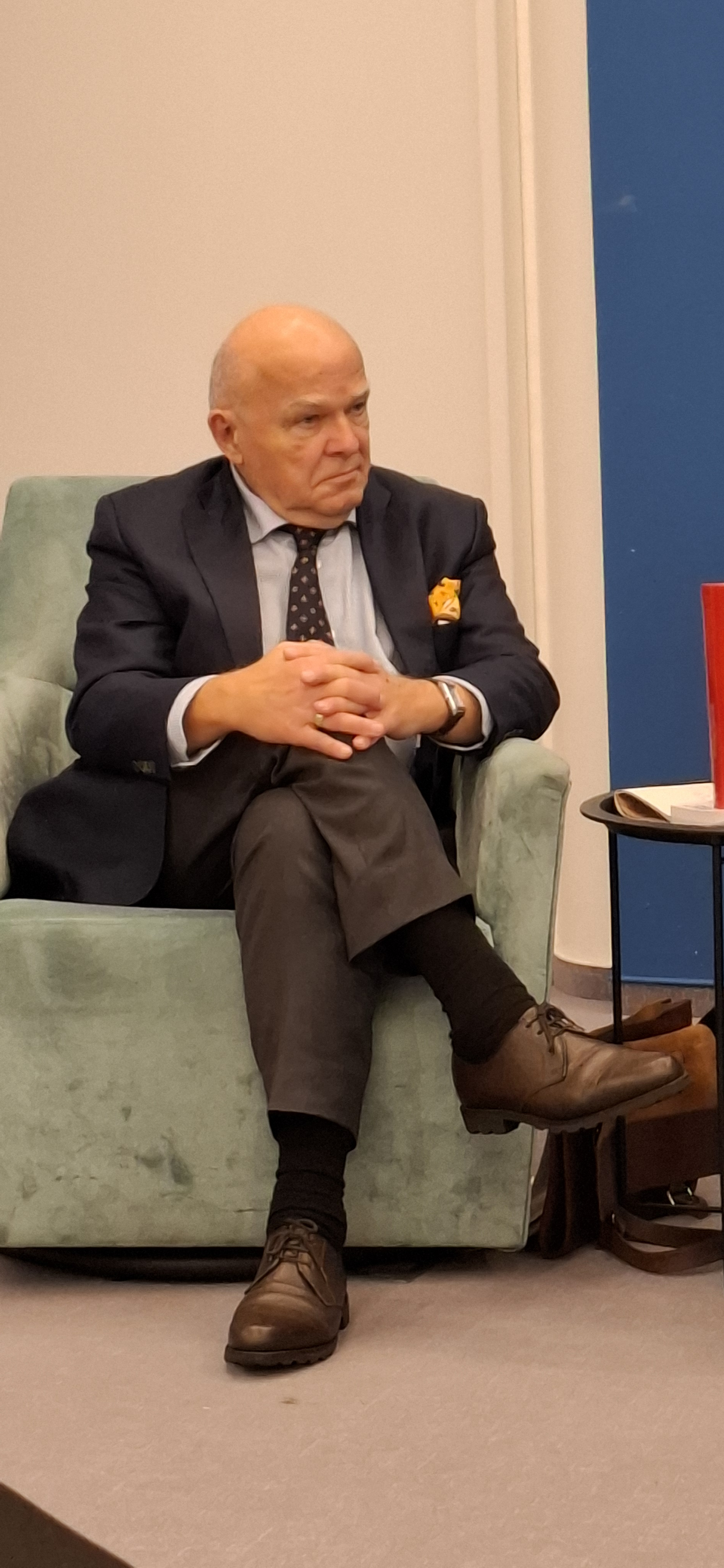
- Born: 2 April 1955 (age 71); Wagna, Austria
- Education: University of Graz; LMU Munich
- Writing career
- Subjects: Minority rights, nationalism, ethnic conflict
- Occupations: Scholar, political scientist

Joseph Marko (born 2 April 1955) is an Austrian legal scholar and political scientist.

== Education and career ==
Marko completed his studies in law and English at the University of Graz with a Dr. jur. (PhD in law) and an MA in English translational sciences in 1977. After post-graduate studies in political sciences and sociology at LMU Munich, he returned to Graz, where he was appointed as an assistant professor at the Faculty of Law. In 1994, Marko earned a Doctorate of Science for Austrian and Comparative Public Law, the Theory of State and Law (Allgemeine Staatslehre) and Political Sciences and became associate professor.

Today Marko holds a chair for Comparative Public Law and Political Sciences at the Institute for Public Law and Political Sciences at the university, focusing on interdisciplinary studies of nationalism, ethnic conflict, power-sharing in divided societies, law and religion. He also focuses on territorial and cultural diversity governance regarding the integration of indigenous peoples and new minorities stemming from immigration.

Marko is also co-director of the Center for Russian, Easteuropean and Eurasian Studies as well as a member of the newly founded Institute for Basic Research in the Legal Sciences (Institut für Rechtswissenschaftliche Grundlagen) at the Faculty of Law. In 2001, he had founded the interdisciplinary Competence Centre South-East Europe (later renamed Centre for Southeast European Studies) at the University of Graz.

Marko has taught as visiting scholar at Rutgers University School of Law, Camden/NJ, the University of Trento Faculty of Law, the Antwerp Faculty of Law, the Fribourg University Faculty of Philosophy, University of Belgrade Faculty of Law, the Skopje Faculty of Law, the Prishtine Faculty of Law and the Shanghai University of Politics and Law. Since 1998, he is also director of the Minority Rights Institute at the European Academy Bolzano (EURAC) in South Tyrol, Italy. From 2011 to 2016, Marko served as dean of the Graz law faculty.

He has (co-)authored four books and (co-edited) twenty volumes as well as more than one hundred scholarly articles in journals and edited volumes. He is the General Editor of the Review of Central and East European Law and runs two-book series with the NOMOS publishing house (Minorities and Autonomies) and Brill publisher (Territorial and Cultural Diversity Governance) together with Francesco Palermo.

== Other positions ==
- 1997–2002, International Judge at the Constitutional Court of Bosnia-Herzegovina, appointed by then President of the European Court for Human Rights, Rolf Ryssdal.
- 1998–2002 and 2006–2008, Member of the Advisory Committee under the Framework Convention for the Protection of National Minorities, elected by the Committee of Ministers of the Council of Europe.
- 2006/2007, Legal adviser for constitutional reform to the High Representative and European Special Representative in Bosnia and Herzegovina, Dr. Christian Schwarz-Schilling, seconded by the Austrian government.
- 2016/2017, Legal adviser to the UN-SASG, Espen Eide, for the Cyprus reunification negotiations.
- 2017, Collaboration with the High Commissioner on National Minorities, Lamberto Zannier, in the elaboration of the Graz Recommendations on "Access to Justice and National Minorities."
- 2008–2018, Member of the Board of supervisors of the Medical University of Graz.
