= Constitutional Court of Republika Srpska =

Judicial court in Bosnia and Herzegovina

Constitutional Court of Republika Srpska Уставни суд Републике Српске (Serbian) Ustavni sud Republike Srpske (Bosnian) Ustavni sud Republike Srpske (Croatian)
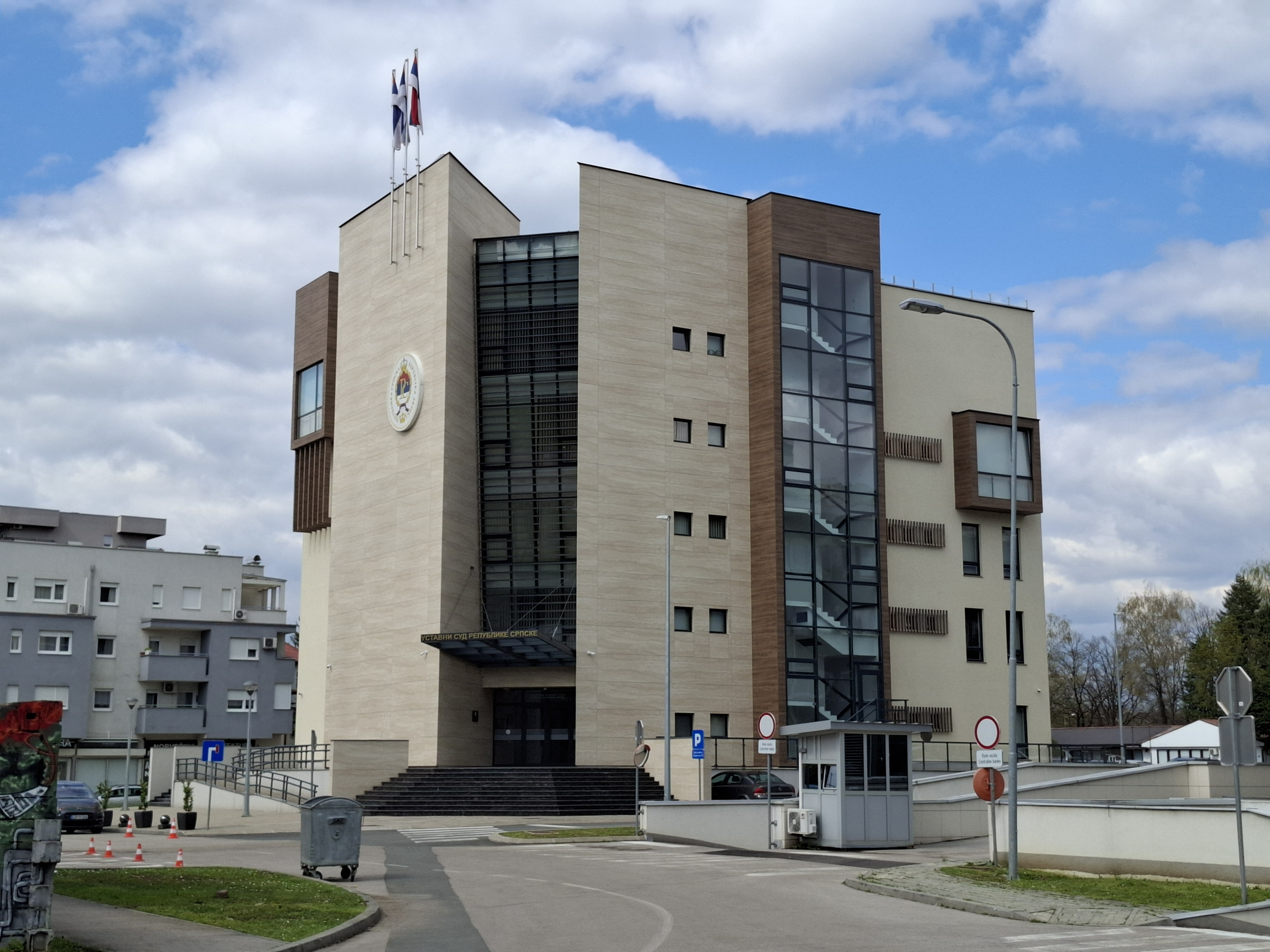
- Constitutional Court of Republika Srpska, Banja Luka
- Established: 1994 (based on 1992 constitution)
- Jurisdiction: Republika Srpska
- Location: Banja Luka
- Authorised by: Constitution of Republika Srpska

President

The Constitutional Court of Republika Srpska (Serbian: Уставни суд Републике Српске, Ustavni sud Republike Srpske; Bosnian: Ustavni sud Republike Srpske; Croatian: Ustavni sud Republike Srpske) is a subnational constitutional court that exercises powers of judicial review within the Republika Srpska, one of the two entities of Bosnia and Herzegovina.

It functions alongside the state-wide Constitutional Court of Bosnia and Herzegovina and the corresponding subnational Constitutional Court of the Federation of Bosnia and Herzegovina. The Court is responsible for ensuring that laws, regulations, and other legal acts comply with the Constitution of Republika Srpska. The court was founded by the Constitution of Republika Srpska on February 28, 1992.

== Jurisdiction ==
Judges of the Constitutional Court of Republika Srpska argued that decisions of the entity constitutional courts should not be subject to review by the Constitutional Court of Bosnia and Herzegovina, since the constitution of Republika Srpska declares its court’s rulings final and binding. The state-level court rejected this argument, holding that entity constitutional courts are part of the legal system of Bosnia and Herzegovina and that their decisions can therefore be challenged before it under the Constitution of Bosnia and Herzegovina. However, the Court stated that it reviews such decisions only for compliance with the Dayton Constitution and the European Convention on Human Rights, while interpretation of entity constitutions remains the responsibility of the entity courts.

== See also ==
- Politics of Bosnia and Herzegovina
- Constitution of Republika Srpska
- Judiciary
- Politics of Republika Srpska
- Rule According to Higher Law
- Rule of law
