= Constitutional Court of Bosnia and Herzegovina =

Highest court of jurisdiction in Bosnia and Herzegovina

Constitutional Court of Bosnia and Herzegovina Ustavni sud Bosne i Hercegovine Уставни суд Босне и Херцеговине
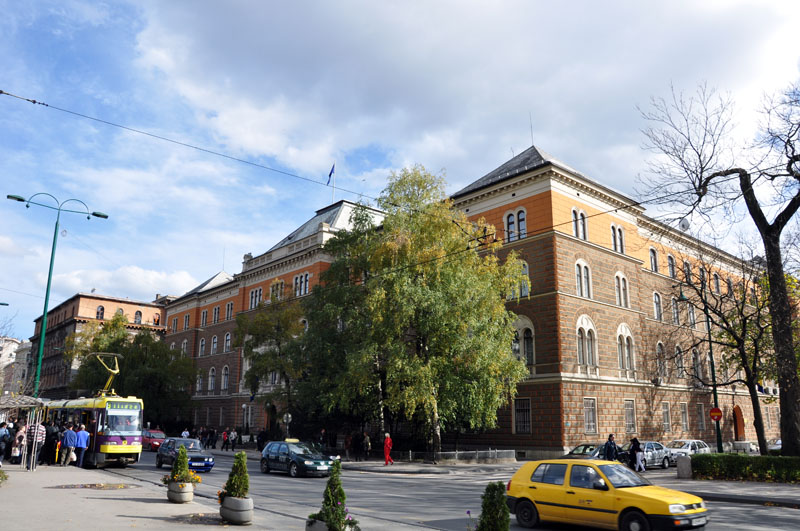
- Building of the Presidency of Bosnia and Herzegovina, seat of the Constitutional Court of Bosnia and Herzegovina
- Interactive map of Constitutional Court of Bosnia and Herzegovina; Ustavni sud Bosne i Hercegovine; Уставни суд Босне и Херцеговине
- 43.8578°N 18.41412°E
- Location: Sarajevo
- Coordinates: 43.8578°N 18.41412°E
- Authorised by: Constitution of Bosnia and Herzegovina
- Judge term length: Five years in the first term, life tenure after renewal with mandatory retirement at the age of 70
- Website: ustavnisud.ba

President
- Currently: Mirsad Ćeman
- Since: 1 June 2024

The Constitutional Court of Bosnia and Herzegovina (Serbo-Croatian: Ustavni sud Bosne i Hercegovine, Уставни суд Босне и Херцеговине) is the interpreter and guardian of the Constitution of Bosnia and Herzegovina. It has the appellate jurisdiction over issues arising out of judgments of any other court in the country, including the constitutional courts of the two entities and the Court of Bosnia and Herzegovina.

== History ==
The federal structure of the former Socialist Federal Republic of Yugoslavia provided a Constitutional Court at the federal level as well as one for the six Republics along with its two Autonomous Provinces – Kosovo and Vojvodina. The Constitutional Court of Bosnia and Herzegovina was established for the first time on 15 February 1964 pursuant to the Constitution of 1963.

Its existence was confirmed in the Constitution of 1974. The functions of the court allowed it to take decisions as to conform to the Republic's laws with the Constitution, and as to the constitutionality and legality of other regulations and general and self-management acts. It was also allowed to resolve disputes between the Republic and other political-territorial units, in particular, conflicts of jurisdiction as between the courts and other bodies of political-territorial units. The 'Law on the Constitutional Court' regulated its structure, jurisdiction and procedure.

The role and jurisdiction of the Constitutional court was redefined in the Dayton Peace Agreement (Annex IV - Constitution of Bosnia and Herzegovina, Article VI).

== Jurisdiction ==
The jurisdiction of the Constitutional Court is defined under Article VI.3 and Article IV.3 of the Constitution. Within its overriding duty to 'uphold' the Constitution of Bosnia and Herzegovina, it consists of five types of jurisdiction. The proceedings to be followed and type of decision to be given will depend upon the type concerned and the nature of the case.

Essentially, the distinction between these various types of jurisdiction is based on the extent to which the Constitutional Court, in addition to the classical task of upholding constitutionality, also has, in certain types of disputes, a more direct relation with the judicial or legislative authority concerned.

=== Disputes arising under conflict of jurisdiction and an abstract review of constitutionality ===
The Constitutional Court has exclusive jurisdiction to decide any dispute that arises under the Constitution between the Entities or between Bosnia and Herzegovina and an Entity or Entities, or between institutions of Bosnia and Herzegovina. In effect, the Court has to decide on positive or negative conflicts of jurisdiction, or any other disputes that may arise under relations between the state and entity authority and/or the institutions of Bosnia and Herzegovina.

The Constitutional Court has jurisdiction over issues whether any provision of an Entity's constitution or a law of an Entity is compatible with the Constitution of Bosnia and Herzegovina.

Although, the Constitution of Bosnia and Herzegovina explicitly focuses only on 'provisions of an Entity's law', this also implies a review of constitutionality of laws of Bosnia and Herzegovina in accordance with the general task of the Court to uphold the Constitution of Bosnia and Herzegovina.

In special cases, the Court also has jurisdiction to examine whether an Entity's decision to establish a special parallel relationship with a neighboring state is consistent with the Constitution including provisions concerning the sovereignty and territorial integrity of Bosnia and Herzegovina.

In both presented cases, under the Constitution, disputes may be referred only by the following authorized parties: a member of the Presidency, the Chair of the Council of Ministers, the Chair or a Deputy Chair of either chamber of the Parliamentary Assembly, one-fourth of the members of either chamber of the Parliamentary Assembly, or one-fourth of either chamber of a legislature of an Entity.

=== Appellate jurisdiction ===
The appellate jurisdiction of the Constitutional Court is established by the constitutional provision according to which the Constitutional Court "shall have appellate jurisdiction over issues under this Constitution arising out of a judgement of any other court in Bosnia and Herzegovina". It suggests that the Court is the highest judicial body in the country.

This provision is effected through the Rules of the Constitutional Court so the Court, if it finds an appeal well-founded, may act in one of two ways: the Court may act as a court of full jurisdiction and it may decide on the merits or it may quash the challenged decision and refer the case back to the court that adopted the judgement for renewed proceedings. The court whose decision has been quashed is required to take another decision in expedient proceedings and, in doing so, it shall be bound by the legal opinion of the Constitutional Court concerning the violation of the appellant’s rights and the fundamental freedoms guaranteed under the Constitution.

=== Referral of an issue by other courts ===
The Constitutional Court has jurisdiction over issues referred by any court in Bosnia and Herzegovina concerning whether a law, on whose validity its decision depends, is compatible with this Constitution, with the European Convention on Human Rights and its Protocols, or with the laws of Bosnia and Herzegovina; or concerning the existence of or the scope of a general rule of public international law.

=== Unblocking of the Parliamentary Assembly ===
The jurisdiction of the Constitutional Court in the case of 'blockage' of the work of the House of Peoples of the Parliamentary Assembly of Bosnia and Herzegovina concerning an issue of destructiveness to the vital interest of constituent peoples, represents in many ways a typical area of activity of a constitutional court, as this represents a close 'interface' between the "judicial" and "legislative" authorities.

== Composition of the Court ==
The Constitutional Court consists of nine judges, out of which four are selected by the House of Representatives of the Federation of Bosnia and Herzegovina, two are selected by National Assembly of the Republic of Srpska, and the remaining three members are selected by the President of the European Court of Human Rights after consultation with the Presidency of Bosnia and Herzegovina (Article VI.1.a).

The Constitution also states (Article VI.1.b) that the judges must be "distinguished jurists of high moral standing", and that any eligible voter so qualified may serve as a judge of the Constitutional Court. The judges selected by the President of the European Court of Human Rights cannot be citizens of Bosnia and Herzegovina or of any neighbouring state.

The term of judges that were initially appointed was five years, and were not eligible for reappointment. Judges subsequently appointed could serve until age 70, unless they resigned or were removed for cause by consensus of the other judges. The Constitution also states that for appointments made more than five years after the initial appointment of judges, the Parliamentary Assembly could provide by law for a different method of selection of the three judges selected by the President of the European Court of Human Rights, however it has still not changed that.

The Constitution does not require the proportionality of the "constituent peoples" in the Court, however a constitutional custom developed by which a Constitutional court should have two judges from every of the constituent peoples (Bosniaks, Serbs and Croats), besides the three foreign judges.

Current composition of the Court:

- Larisa Velić (2025–present)
- Valerija Galić (2002, president 2012–2015, vice-president 2015–2022, president 2022–2024, vice-president 2024–present)
- Mirsad Ćeman (2008, president 2015–2018, vice-president 2018–2024, president 2025–present)
- Marin Vukoja (2024)
- Angelika Nussberger (Germany, 2020, vice-president 2024–present)
- Helen Keller (Switzerland, 2020, vice-president 2022–2024)
- Ledi Bianku (Albania, 2022)
- Two vacancies

Former Judges:

- Seada Palavrić (2005, president 2008–2009, president 2024–2025)
- Zlatko M. Knežević (2011–2024, vice-president 2015–2018, president 2018–2021)
- Miodrag Simović (2003–2022, president 2009–2012, vice-president 2021–2022)
- Mato Tadić (2002–2022, president 2003–2006, vice-president 2015–2021, president 2021–2022)
- Hatidža Hadžiosmanović (2002–2008, vice-president 2005–2006, president 2006–2008)
- Tudor Panțîru (Romania/Moldova, 2002–2022)
- Margarita Caca-Nikolovska (North Macedonia, 2011–2020, vice-president 2015–2020)
- Giovanni Grasso (Italy, 2016–2020)
- Constance Grewe (Germany, 2004–2016)
- David Feldman (United Kingdom, 2002–2011)
- Joseph Marko (Austria, 1997–2002)
- Louis Favoreu (France, 1997–2002)

The way the judges are selected has created controversies over the years. Since there are no other criteria or formal guidelines besides the criteria that judges should be "distinguished jurists of high moral standing", this has led to a situation that it is easier to become a judge of the national constitutional court then the judge of a lower court, since that position has more requirements and specific process of vetting. Also, political influence has a great part in the appointment of judges, so persons with very active political carriers have been chosen by the parliaments of entities, like the current judges Seada Palavrić and Mirsad Ćeman (former longtime members of SDA party) or Krstan Simić (member of SNSD party before his selection). Judge Krstan Simić was subsequently dismissed from the Court by the consensus of other judges, because of his controversial correspondence with his former party leader.

== Notable decisions ==
Decision on the constituency of peoples is the landmark case of the Constitutional Court of Bosnia and Herzegovina, instituted for an evaluation of the consistency of the Constitution of the Republika Srpska and the Constitution of the Federation of Bosnia and Herzegovina with the Constitution of Bosnia and Herzegovina. The four partial decisions were made in a year 2000, by which many of articles of the constitutions of entities were found to be unconstitutional, which had a great impact on politics of Bosnia and Herzegovina, because there was a need to adjust the current state in the country with the decision of the Court. There was a narrow majority (5-4), in the favor of the applicant.

The formal name of this item is U-5/98, but it is widely known as the "Decision on the constituency of peoples" (Serbo-Croatian: Odluka o konstitutivnosti naroda), referring to the Court's interpretation of the significance of the phrase "constituent peoples" used in the Preamble of the Constitution of Bosnia and Herzegovina. The decision was also the basis for other notable cases that came before the court.

== See also ==
- Constitutional Court of the Federation of Bosnia and Herzegovina
- Constitutional Court of Republika Srpska
- Constitution
- Constitutionalism
- Constitutional economics
- Jurisprudence
- Judiciary
- Rule of law
- Rule According to Higher Law
