= Constitution of Bosnia and Herzegovina =

Overview
- Original title: Ustav Bosne i Hercegovine / Устав Босне и Херцеговине
- Jurisdiction: Bosnia and Herzegovina
- Created: 21 November 1995
- Ratified: 14 December 1995
- Date effective: 14 December 1995
- System: Parliamentary system; collective presidency

Government structure
- Branches: 3
- Chambers: Bicameral (Parliamentary Assembly of Bosnia and Herzegovina)
- Executive: Collective Presidency; Council of Ministers
- Judiciary: Constitutional Court of Bosnia and Herzegovina
- Federalism: Federation (two entities and Brčko District)

History
- Amendments: 1
- Last amended: 2009
- Signatories: Alija Izetbegović; Franjo Tuđman; Slobodan Milošević
- Supersedes: Constitution of the Republic of Bosnia and Herzegovina (1993–1995)

Footnote
- Forms Annex 4 of the General Framework Agreement for Peace in Bosnia and Herzegovina.

The Constitution of Bosnia and Herzegovina (Serbo-Croatian: Ustav Bosne i Hercegovine, Устав Босне и Херцеговине) is the supreme law of Bosnia and Herzegovina. The current text is Annex 4 to the General Framework Agreement for Peace, initiated on 21 November 1995 and signed on 14 December 1995. The Constitution affirms state continuity, establishes institutions, allocates competences between the State and the Entities, and incorporates extensive human-rights guarantees with explicit reference to the European Convention.

== Text and structure ==
The Constitution consists of a Preamble and twelve Articles (I–XII), with annexes cross-referencing human-rights treaties. Article I defines the State and citizenship; Article II incorporates the European Convention on Human Rights (ECHR) and enumerates rights; Article III distributes competences between the State and the Entities (with provision for “additional responsibilities” by agreement); Article IV establishes the bicameral Parliamentary Assembly; Article V defines the three-member Presidency; Article VI establishes the Constitutional Court; Article VII provides for the Central Bank; Articles VIII–XII cover finances, general and transitional provisions, and amendments.

== Human rights ==
Under Article II(2), the ECHR has direct applicability and priority over other law in Bosnia and Herzegovina; Annex I lists additional human-rights instruments binding on the State. The Constitution prohibits discrimination and guarantees return of refugees and displaced persons (Article II(4)–(5)).

== Institutions and competences ==
The Parliamentary Assembly comprises the House of Representatives and the House of Peoples. The collective Presidency has three members (a Bosniak and a Croat from the Federation of Bosnia and Herzegovina, and a Serb from Republika Srpska). The Constitutional Court (Article VI) “shall uphold this Constitution,” with jurisdiction to resolve disputes under the Constitution and to review the constitutionality of laws. The Central Bank of Bosnia and Herzegovina (Article VII) maintains monetary stability.

== Amendment procedure ==
Article X provides that the Constitution may be amended by decision of the Parliamentary Assembly, including a two-thirds majority of those present and voting in the House of Representatives. No amendment may eliminate or diminish the rights and freedoms in Article II. The Constitution has been amended once (Amendment I, 2009) to integrate the Brčko District into the constitutional text.

== Judicial interpretation ==
In the landmark U-5/98 (“Constituent Peoples”) case (2000), the Constitutional Court interpreted key provisions concerning equality and representation of the three constituent peoples across both entities. Subsequent analysis by the Venice Commission addressed implementation and broader constitutional implications.

== Compliance with the European Convention on Human Rights ==
The European Court of Human Rights has delivered several judgments concerning constitutional arrangements:

- Sejdić and Finci v. Bosnia and Herzegovina (Grand Chamber, 22 December 2009) held that ineligibility of persons not belonging to the constituent peoples to stand for the Presidency and House of Peoples was discriminatory.
- Zornić v. Bosnia and Herzegovina (15 July 2014) found a violation where a citizen refusing to declare affiliation with a constituent people was ineligible.
- Pilav v. Bosnia and Herzegovina (9 June 2016) found a violation regarding a Bosniak resident of Republika Srpska ineligible to stand for the Presidency.
- Pudarić v. Bosnia and Herzegovina (8 December 2020) found a violation where a politician residing in the Federation could not run for the Serb seat in the Presidency.
- Kovačević v. Bosnia and Herzegovina—Chamber judgment of 29 August 2023 found a violation of Article 1 of Protocol No. 12 in respect of representation in the House of Peoples and the Presidency; however, on 25 June 2025 the Grand Chamber held the application inadmissible (abuse of process; lack of victim status).

== Reform proposals ==
In 2006, a U.S.-facilitated compromise—popularly known as the “April Package”—sought to modernize institutions (streamlining the Presidency, strengthening the Council of Ministers and State competences) but failed in the House of Representatives by two votes. The Parliamentary Assembly of the Council of Europe took note of the outcome in Resolution 1513 (2006). The Venice Commission issued an opinion on the 2006 draft amendments. Subsequent reform discussions have continued in light of the ECtHR case-law.

== See also ==
- Dayton Agreement
- Constitutional Court of Bosnia and Herzegovina
- European Convention on Human Rights
