= Coat of arms of Banja Luka =

- Great coat of arms

Versions
- Middle coat of arms

- Small coat of arms
- Armiger: City of Banja Luka
- Adopted: 20 July 2017
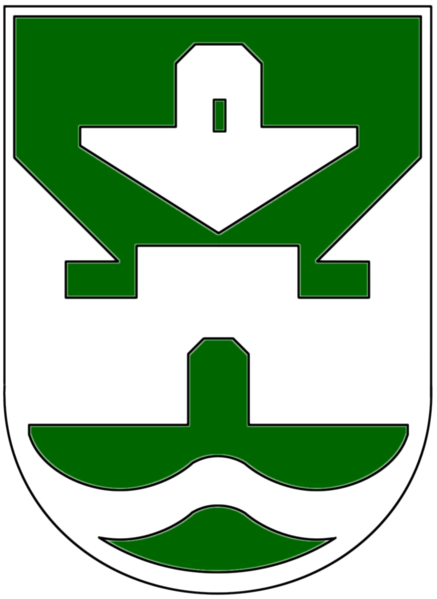
- Predecessor
- Designer: Dragomir Acović and Ljubodrag Grujić

The coat of arms of Banja Luka is an official symbol of Banja Luka and exists in three levels – as the basic or small, middle, and great coat of arms.

Banja Luka's heraldic history is comparatively recent, with its beginnings traceable to the first half of the 20th century, when the first unsuccessful attempt at establishing municipal heraldic insignia took place. The city first received an official emblem during Socialist Yugoslavia, which remained in use until 1992, when, amid the breakup of the state and the war in Bosnia and Herzegovina, Banja Luka held a competition that produced a new coat of arms, which served as the city's official symbol until 2013. That year, the Constitutional Court of Republika Srpska declared the Banja Luka coat of arms unconstitutional for violating the principle of constitutiveness of peoples and equality of citizens, after which Banja Luka began the search for a new coat of arms. After four unsuccessful attempts, in early 2017 the city adopted a new three-tiered coat of arms, designed by architect Dragomir Acović and Ljubodrag Grujić.

The use of the coat of arms of Banja Luka is regulated by the city statute and special city regulations that detail and penalize the use of the coat of arms in various circumstances and locations.

== Blazon ==
The coat of arms of the City of Banja Luka is defined in the city's Statute at three levels – basic, middle, and great – as presented below.

=== Basic coat of arms ===
Blazon of the basic coat of arms:

On a shield of Baroque form: per fess, in chief gules a stone wall argent with black mortar lines, in the center a two-story tower with an arched gateway and one window sable on each floor, with a pyramidal argent roof with a pronounced eave; flanking the tower on each side a smaller single-story tower argent, each with one window sable and a roof as described; in base argent with azure the confronted prows of two dajak boats issuing from the flanks of the shield; over all a wavy azure fess above a like bar.

=== Middle coat of arms ===
Blazon of the middle coat of arms:

As the basic coat of arms, on a shield of Baroque form: per fess, in chief gules a stone wall argent with black mortar lines, in the center a two-story tower with an arched gateway and one window sable on each floor, with a pyramidal argent roof with a pronounced eave; flanking the tower on each side a smaller single-story tower argent, each with one window sable and a roof as described; in base argent with azure the confronted prows of two dajak boats issuing from the flanks of the shield; over all a wavy azure fess above a like bar. The shield crowned with a golden stone wall crown with four visible merlons and a diadem.

=== Great coat of arms ===
Blazon of the great coat of arms:

The middle coat of arms of Banja Luka surrounded by supporters: on the dexter a natural figure of Petar Kočić habited in a dark gray redingote after the fashion of the early 20th century; on the sinister a natural figure of Ban Svetislav Milosavljević habited in a tailcoat with corresponding decorations and sash. Both supporters hold a natural wooden pole bound with gold, from which flies a square banner of Republika Srpska edged with golden fringes (dexter) and of Banja Luka (sinister). The banner of Banja Luka bears identical content to the shield of the basic coat of arms. The poles of both banners are crowned with golden thorn wreaths. The compartment is a cluster of golden leaves of wild chestnut (Aesculus hippocastanum) intertwined with green leafy branches of linden (Tilia tomentosa).

== Use ==
The use and protection of the coat of arms of Banja Luka is regulated by the Statute of the City and the Decision on the Use of the Symbols of the City of Banja Luka. The normative framework for regulating the topic of the arms is provided by the Law on Local Self-Government of Republika Srpska, which stipulates that "[...] the form, content, and use of symbols shall be regulated by the statute of the local self-government unit in accordance with the law."

According to the Decision on the Use of the Symbols of the City of Banja Luka, the symbols of the city may not be damaged or used inappropriately, improperly, or in a manner that offends public morals and the dignity of the citizens of Banja Luka, and may only be used in the form, with the content, and in the manner prescribed by the Statute and the Decision on Use. Use requires the approval of the relevant authority. No entity may use the symbols of the city unless so approved, in the manner prescribed by the Decision on Use. The decision granting use of the city's symbols determines, among other things, the purpose, conditions of use, period of validity, as well as other restrictions appropriate to the use of the city's symbols in each specific case. Decisions regarding the use of the city's symbols by legal and natural persons, as well as for various events held under the patronage or in honor of the city, are made by the organizational units of the City Administration corresponding to their competence and the activities they oversee within their scope of work.

An appeal may be filed against this decision of the city, submitted to the Mayor within the time frame defined in the Decision. Additionally, if it is determined that the holder of an issued approval for the use of the coat of arms is using it contrary to the established purpose and conditions of the approval, the competent unit of the City Administration responsible for supervising the implementation of the Decision on Use may revoke the act granting permission to use the arms.

The appearance of the coat of arms at all three levels, for official use, shall be defined by a master copy produced on the basis of the blazon from the Statute. The master copy is to be determined and prescribed by the Mayor and kept in their office.

The use of the coat of arms is prohibited if it is damaged or if its appearance makes it unsuitable for use. The arms may exceptionally be used as an integral part of other emblems and coats of arms, or signs, but only in its original form and in a manner that ensures the dignity and prestige of the city. The use of the coat of arms of the City of Banja Luka in art and for educational and instructional purposes is freely allowed, provided that it does not violate good taste, social and moral norms, heraldic practice and tradition, the Decision on Use, and that it does not offend the reputation of the City of Banja Luka.

Regulations impose an absolute prohibition on the commercial use of the coat of arms. Thus, the arms may not be used as a commercial or service trademark, pattern, or model, nor as any other sign for marking goods or services.

Regarding the official use of the coat of arms, the Decision on Use prescribes the following:

Great coat of arms

- The Great coat of arms of the City is the mark and symbol of the City.
- The Great coat of arms is displayed on the building housing the seat of the City Administration and all other buildings of the city administration, as well as in the rooms where sessions of the City Assembly are held, in the Mayor's Cabinet, and in other official premises by decision of the Mayor.
- The Great coat of arms of the City is displayed on particularly solemn occasions highlighting the significance and traditions of the City, i.e., when representing the City, and is mandatorily impressed, i.e., printed on charters, diplomas, and other public awards granted by the City.
- The Great coat of arms of the City is displayed at the border of the City's territory.

Middle coat of arms

- The Middle coat of arms of the City is also the official coat of arms of the City Administration and may be used in the regular activities of all bodies of the City.
- The Middle coat of arms of the City is used on items given for representative purposes.
- The Middle coat of arms of the City is used on the letterhead, envelopes, official invitations, greeting cards, and business cards used by City officials.

Basic (Small) coat of arms

- The Basic (Small) coat of arms of the City is the mark and symbol of the City, used by all bodies of the City Administration for marking official premises and in official use.
- The Basic coat of arms is used:
  As part of forms and public documents, when prescribed by laws, decisions, and other regulations;
  As part of markings on the uniforms of City officials, when prescribed by laws, decisions, and other regulations;
  On official invitations, greeting cards, etc., used by the heads of departments and services of the City Administration;
  On street name signs within the City's territory;
  In other cases, if its use is not contrary to this decision.

The coat of arms may only be used in accordance with heraldic, vexillological, and sphragistic practice, and the Decision on Use precisely details the manner and rules governing the prescribed display of the arms in this sense. The enforcement of all the above rules is overseen by the Department of Communal Police of the City Administration of the City of Banja Luka, which in the event of a violation of the rules has the right to impose fines on offenders. Fines are tiered by type of violation as prescribed by the Decision on Use.

== History ==
=== Early proposal ===
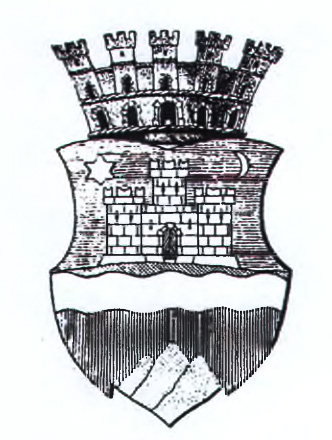
Coat of arms proposed by Bojničić–Duišin

Similar to most settlements in the Balkan Peninsula, due to the absence of appropriate historical or social and cultural prerequisites municipal heraldic practice in Banja Luka did not take root and develop until the 20th century. The first attempt to define municipal heraldic insignia for Banja Luka was undertaken in the first half of the 20th century, in the period following the creation of the Kingdom of Yugoslavia. This involved a proposal for the city's coat of arms by Croatian heraldist Viktor Antun Duišin, created by painter Vera Bojničić Zamola, daughter of Croatian historian and heraldist Ivan Bojničić Kninski. The proposal failed and was never seriously considered.

The proposal for the coat of arms consisted of the following elements: the basic sequence of colors/metals (blue–white–red), alluding to the flag of Yugoslavia, i.e., to the Pan-Slavic colors; a wavy fess as a reminiscence of the river Vrbas; a fortified town as an allusion to the Kastel Fortress — with a marked association to the fortress in the coat of arms of Zagreb; the presence of a crescent moon and star (as a dual allusion to the coat of arms of Illyria and an element following the fortress motif in the coat of arms of Zagreb). The shield is of a Baroque form (though it has no grounding in local tradition), and a wall crown whose structure and construction were derived from the prior Hungarian heraldic norm for settlements. Although not adopted, this proposed coat of arms is notable for some of its elements, which have remained relevant to this day.

This proposal, like other similar proposals for municipal coats of arms in places where heraldic practice did not exist, was driven primarily by political rather than heraldic reasons; it was part of a broader ideological integrative project following the creation of a common Yugoslav state. The Yugoslav government sought to overcome and regulate the social divide and differences that existed between the territories and nations brought together in the common state – including in the domain of municipal heraldry, where there was a more than obvious disparity between territories with developed heraldic practice such as Slovenia, Croatia, or Vojvodina, and the rest of the country where this practice was virtually nonexistent.

=== Socialist Yugoslavia – the first coat of arms ===
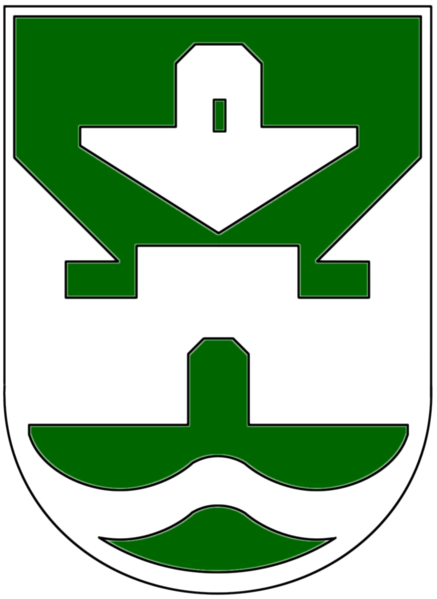
Coat of arms of the Municipality of Banja Luka during the SFRY period

The second half of the 20th century brought a turning point in the official symbolic marking of the city. The legal basis for the adoption of a new emblem was, as in other municipalities across socialist Yugoslavia, a statutory provision stating that "the Municipality has its own emblem." Banja Luka adopted one accordingly. Thus, in Article 5 of the Statute of the Municipality of Banja Luka from 1974, the following was defined as the municipal emblem:

The Municipality has its own emblem that symbolizes the historical and freedom-loving traditions of the city of Banja Luka.

The emblem of the Municipality of Banja Luka represents a green field in the shape of a shield bordered by a white band, with stylized white representations of the monument to fallen fighters of Bosnian Krajina in the upper part, the walls of the old Kastel fortress in the center, and the Vrbas river at the bottom of the field.

A five-pointed red star is located in the upper left corner of the green field. (Note: Notably, the five-pointed red star was not present on the actual emblem that was in use by the municipal government of Banja Luka.)

=== War and aftermath – new coat of arms ===
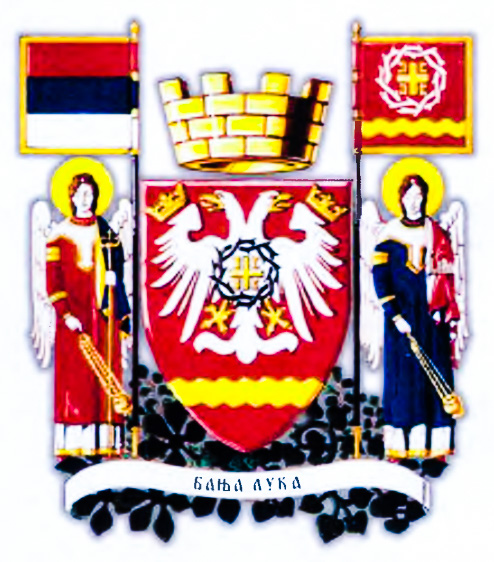
Proposal by Dragomir Acović from the 1992 competition

Dramatic changes in the domain of municipal heraldry brought about by the breakup of Yugoslavia and the Bosnian War also affected the coat of arms of Banja Luka. Due to the nature of the conflict, symbols of cities and municipalities were altered to incorporate the symbolism of the dominant ethnic group in a given city or municipality. (Note: According to Acović, in the territory of the Federation of Bosnia and Herzegovina the dominance of the Bosniak majority is expressed heraldically through the dominant role of the crescent or fleur-de-lis and the color green, while that of the Croats is expressed through the Croatian checkerboard or "interlace"; in Republika Srpska, it is expressed through the double-headed eagle and the Serbian cross.) The new coat of arms adopted in 1992 was adopted within this framework. That year, a public competition for the city's coat of arms was announced. Although detailed information about the competition was never published, among the participants were the Serbian Heraldry Society and Dragomir Acović, who submitted a proposal for a three-tiered coat of arms. The eventual winner – a solution that, with minor refinements and graphical adjustments, persisted as the coat of arms of the city until the Constitutional Court's decision in 2013 – emerged from this process.

Coat of arms of Banja Luka from 1992 to 2013

According to Article 6 of the Statute of the City of Banja Luka that was in use at the time, the coat of arms was defined as follows:

The coat of arms of the City is a blue field, in the shape of a shield, bordered by a golden band, with a depiction of Banski Dvor in the upper part, a chestnut leaf (symbol of Banja Luka's avenues), Kastel (Castrum) — the old Roman fortress, at the bottom of the shield – and a stylized line of the Vrbas river. The central part of the coat of arms symbolizes the foundations of the Cathedral, in white, and in the center of the foundations is a cross with firesteels, in red.

The official status of this coat of arms was defined by the Statute of the City from 2005, followed by Decisions on the use of the symbols and name of the City of Banja Luka from 2008 and 2010 and finally the adoption of the Book of Graphic Standards in 2011. (Note: A Book of Graphic Standards is a document that serves as a guide for the consistent and functional use of a municipality's or city's system of visual identity.)

==== Decision of the Constitutional Court of Republika Srpska ====
On 31 March 2006, the Constitutional Court of Bosnia and Herzegovina ruled that the coat of arms of the Federation of Bosnia and Herzegovina and the coat of arms of Republika Srpska were unconstitutional. The ruling, in response to a lawsuit filed by Sulejman Tihić with Muhamed Filipović as the formal representative of the complaint, brought the issue of territorial heraldry under judicial intervention. A direct consequence of the judicial practice that began with this ruling was the 20 February 2013 decision of the Constitutional Court of Republika Srpska, by which the coat of arms of Banja Luka was declared unconstitutional.

The Club of Delegates from the Bosniak people in the Council of Peoples of Republika Srpska filed an initiative with the Constitutional Court of Republika Srpska to assess the constitutionality and legality of Article 6 of the Statute of the City of Banja Luka, more specifically the provisions of the article defining the specific appearance of the city's symbols. (Note: Paragraphs 2 and 3) The petitioner argued that the aforementioned paragraphs of Article 6 were not in accordance with articles (Note: Article 1 (par. 4) and Article 10 of the Constitution of Republika Srpska) of the Constitution of Republika Srpska, which establish the principle of constitutiveness and equality of peoples and citizens, as well as non-discrimination on any basis. The petitioner also argued that the disputed paragraphs of the city statute were not consistent with an article (Note: Article 5 (par. 2)) of the Law on Local Self-Government, which prescribes that the symbol shall express the historical, cultural, and natural heritage of the unit of local self-government.

The Assembly of the City of Banja Luka submitted a response to the Constitutional Court, in which it cited the provisions of the Article (Note: Article 5 (par. 2, 3, and 4)) of the Law on Local Self-Government regulating the issue of municipal symbols, and pointed to the provision of Article 118 of the disputed statute, which prescribed that the appearance of the symbol from the disputed article was of a temporary nature and that it would be determined by a special statutory decision – following the completion of the procedure prescribed by law.

As previously mentioned, at the session held on 20 February 2013, the Constitutional Court of Republika Srpska determined that the disputed paragraphs of Article 6 of this statute were not in accordance with the Constitution of Republika Srpska and the Law on Local Self-Government. In its decision, the court concluded, among other things, the following:

Considering that the coat of arms of the City of Banja Luka, on the basis of the cited constitutional and legal provisions, should express the historical, cultural, and natural heritage of all citizens of this unit of local self-government, the Court assessed that the disputed provisions of Article 6 par. 2 and 3 of the Statute of the City of Banja Luka are not in accordance with the Constitution of Republika Srpska and the Law on Local Self-Government. Namely, the coat of arms of the City of Banja Luka is the official symbol of this unit of local self-government and as such, in the Court's assessment, should be acceptable to all citizens of that territorial unit, as established and stated in the cited provisions of the Constitution of Republika Srpska. Given that the disputed provisions of the Statute prescribe that the central part of the coat of arms symbolizes the foundations of the Cathedral, in white, and that in the center of the foundations is a cross with firesteels, in red, it is indisputable, in the Court's assessment, that these are symbols representing the culture, tradition, and historical heritage of only the Serbian people, i.e., that these are not symbols with which all citizens living in this city can identify. Accordingly, the Court assessed that the disputed provisions of the Statute of the City of Banja Luka violate Article 5 par. 1 items 1 and 2, and Article 10 of the Constitution of Republika Srpska, and Article 5 of the Law on Local Self-Government.

=== Search for a new coat of arms ===
The Constitutional Court's ruling initiated the process of adopting a new coat of arms for the city. Before Banja Luka received its current coat of arms, there were four unsuccessful attempts to adopt one.

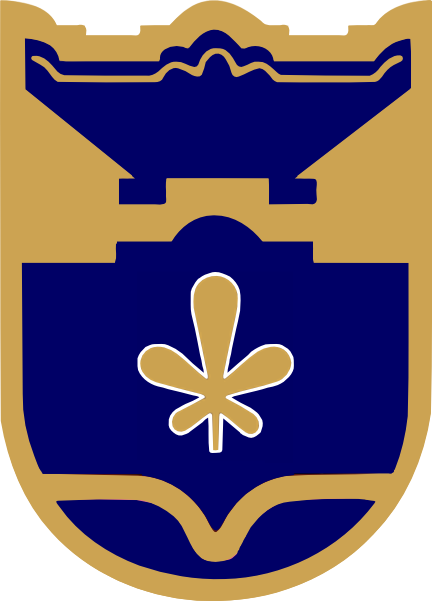
First proposal for the coat of arms of Banja Luka

The first attempt to define the city's coat of arms after the court's ruling was made by an expert commission, assembled by then-mayor Slobodan Gavranović. The commission began its work shortly after the court's ruling and presented its proposal in the summer of 2013. The proposal, which the mayor evaluated as "the most acceptable and least painful solution," consisted of almost the same elements as the previous coat of arms, with the difference that the elements identified by the court as unconstitutional – the cross with four firesteels and the symbolized foundations of the Cathedral – were removed, and a chestnut leaf was introduced in their place. Due to disagreements over the proposal within the ruling coalition in the Assembly of the City of Banja Luka, this proposal was withdrawn from the agenda on the day it was to be discussed, and simultaneously it was decided that the project for the city's coat of arms would proceed via a public competition.

The public competition, which was also the second attempt to adopt a new coat of arms, was announced on 15 July 2013. Thirty entries were submitted, and were reviewed by a specially formed Selection Commission, submitting to the mayor the one it considered most suitable to be the city's new coat of arms. According to procedure, after agreement with the mayor, the proposal was to be presented to the councilors in the Assembly, and if they adopted the proposal, it would proceed to a public debate. However, the public debate never took place. The entries entered into the competition, as well as the one selected by the Commission, were never published. At the Assembly session held on 28 November, where the coat of arms proposal was discussed, Mayor Gavranović stated in a document submitted to the councilors that he did not approve the submitted coat of arms proposal. According to the mayor, the proposed solution did not contain enough elements by which Banja Luka was recognizable in Bosnia and Herzegovina, the region, and beyond, i.e., that the City has other symbols that should have been incorporated into the coat of arms, by which the city is far more recognizable to the wider community. At the same session, a new competition for the city's coat of arms was also announced.

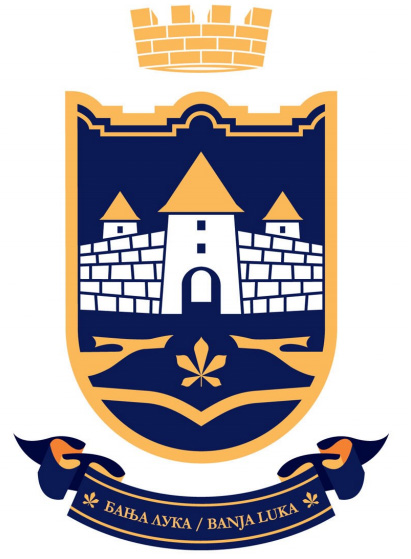
Proposal for the middle coat of arms by author Draško Bošnjak

A third attempt to adopt a coat of arms for Banja Luka was launched on 23 December 2013, when a public competition was announced. The competition required adherence to pre-established criteria according to which the coat of arms proposal must reflect the historical, cultural, and natural heritage of the City of Banja Luka. In addition, as stated by the president of the Commission for the selection of the conceptual solution for the coat of arms:

The coat of arms must be composed and described according to the rules of heraldry. The form and shape of the coat of arms must allow for multi-color printing technique, and the coat of arms, as a symbol, must be usable for the production of plaques, badges, public awards, souvenirs, and must be produced in two variants – a basic variant, the so-called small coat of arms, and an expanded variant, or official middle coat of arms.

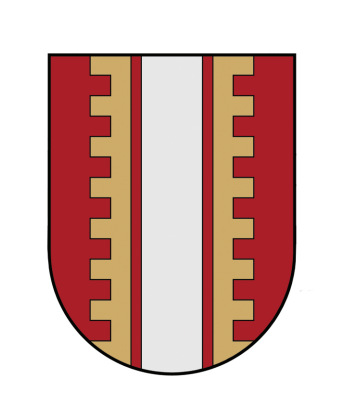
Proposal for the small coat of arms by Marlović and Nikolić

Forty-seven proposals were entered into the competition, of which the Commission rejected seventeen, on the grounds that they did not meet the above criteria. Of the remaining entries, in the Commission's assessment, the most suitable for the city's coat of arms was the work of Draško Bošnjak, a graduate visual artist, which was accepted by the assembly and sent to a public debate.

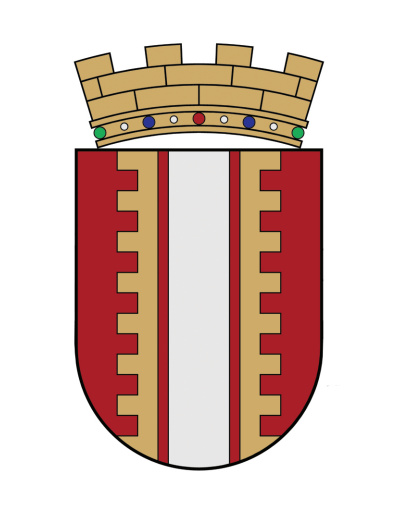
Proposal for the middle coat of arms by Marlović and Nikolić

After the second attempt to adopt a coat of arms through a public competition failed, i.e., after it was withdrawn from the public debate, the mayor decided to entrust the work to heraldists. As such, Zoran Nikolić and Srđan Marlović, who had also participated in the previous competition, presented the Commission for the selection of the new coat of arms with three proposals, of which it selected the one it considered best, and forwarded it to the assembly, which subsequently adopted and submitted it to a public debate. The proposal by Nikolić and Marlović envisioned a coat of arms in three tiers – as the basic or small, middle, and great coat of arms. In outlining the principal motifs of their proposal, the authors state:

The proposal for the coat of arms draws upon the historical heraldic heritage and cultural legacy of the City of Banja Luka, while simultaneously striving to fully retain the content of the existing emblem of the City, this time giving it proper heraldic treatment. In this way, the new insignia of Banja Luka is based on existing symbols, which have now found adequate and correct heraldic expression, thereby constructing a unique and authentic insignia.

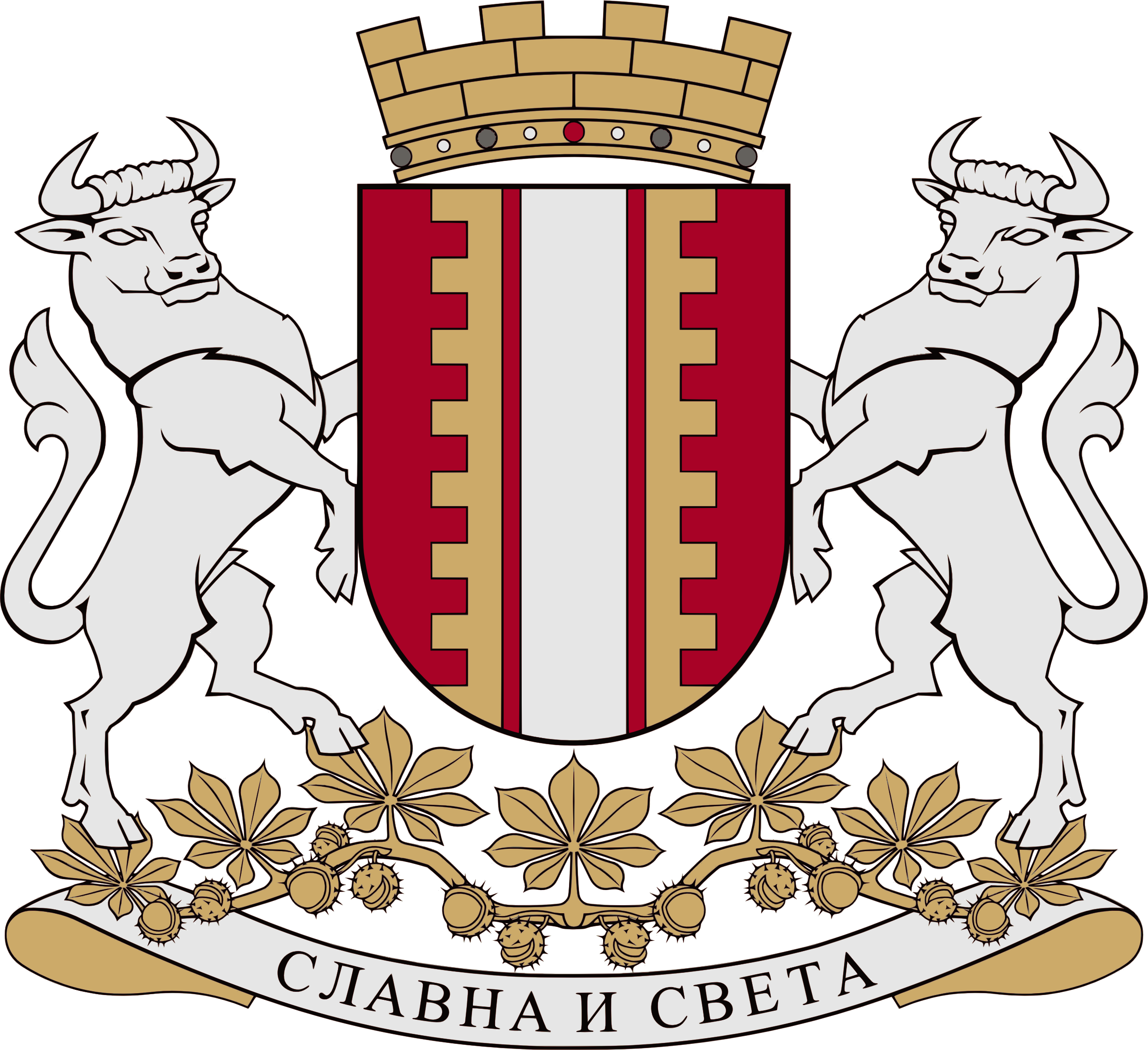
Proposal for the great coat of arms by Marlović and Nikolić

Regarding the colors used in the proposal, as creators stated: "...the proposed (small) coat of arms of Banja Luka draws upon the tinctures of the coats of arms of our medieval nobility, thereby preserving the fundamental heraldic continuity, which is a symbolic confirmation of the historical endurance of the City. These are the heraldic metals gold (which in heraldry denotes glory, wisdom, constancy, and faith) and silver (denoting purity, truth, peace, and joy), and the heraldic enamel red (denoting courage, magnanimity, strength, and fortune). These most common tinctures on the family coats of arms of our nobility are also the three most prevalent colors on ethnographic motifs and the folk costume of Krajina." The creators also proposed a flag for the city, as a banner of arms, which is as such identical in content to the coat of arms transferred onto a rectangular field in a 3:4 ratio.

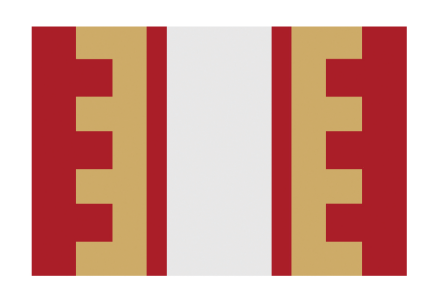
Proposal for the flag by Marlović and Nikolić

Similar to the previous proposal, this coat of arms was not popular among the citizens of Banja Luka, for the same reasons as the previous proposals. This time however, the opposition was even more pronounced and evident than in the previous case. The coat of arms proposal was heraldically perfectly sound, almost entirely historically and nationally neutral, graphically impeccable, and thereby fulfilled all the conditions formally required of the authors. The criticism as to why such a coat of arms was unacceptable came not from the standpoint of the prescribed competition criteria, but precisely because the coat of arms did not contain the national symbols with which the citizens of Banja Luka identified. For these reasons, the city assembly unanimously rejected the Nikolić and Marlović proposal for the city coat of arms at its session on 23 July 2015.

=== Current coat of arms ===
After four years since the court declared the coat of arms unconstitutional, and following two failed competitions and four rejected proposals for the city's coat of arms, newly elected mayor Igor Radojičić sought assistance from heraldist Dragomir Acović, whom he described as "the man with the richest professional experience in these parts, with whom we worked when there were problems regarding the coat of arms of Republika Srpska". An expert commission was formed with the purpose of assisting in the preparation of the proposal, and was composed of: Zoran Banović, professor at the Academy of Arts; Zoran Pejašinović, historian and director of the Banja Luka Gymnasium; Milenko Stanković, professor at the Faculty of Architecture, Civil Engineering and Geodesy; Borivoje Milošević, assistant professor at the History Department of the Faculty of Philosophy; Bojan Stojnić, historian and director of the Archives of Republika Srpska; and Maja Dodig, professor at the Faculty of Architecture, Civil Engineering and Geodesy. As for the criteria for creating the city coat of arms, they did not significantly change from those established four years prior, following the court's ruling. The criteria were officially defined as "Guidelines for the preparation of the conceptual solution for the coat of arms of the City of Banja Luka."

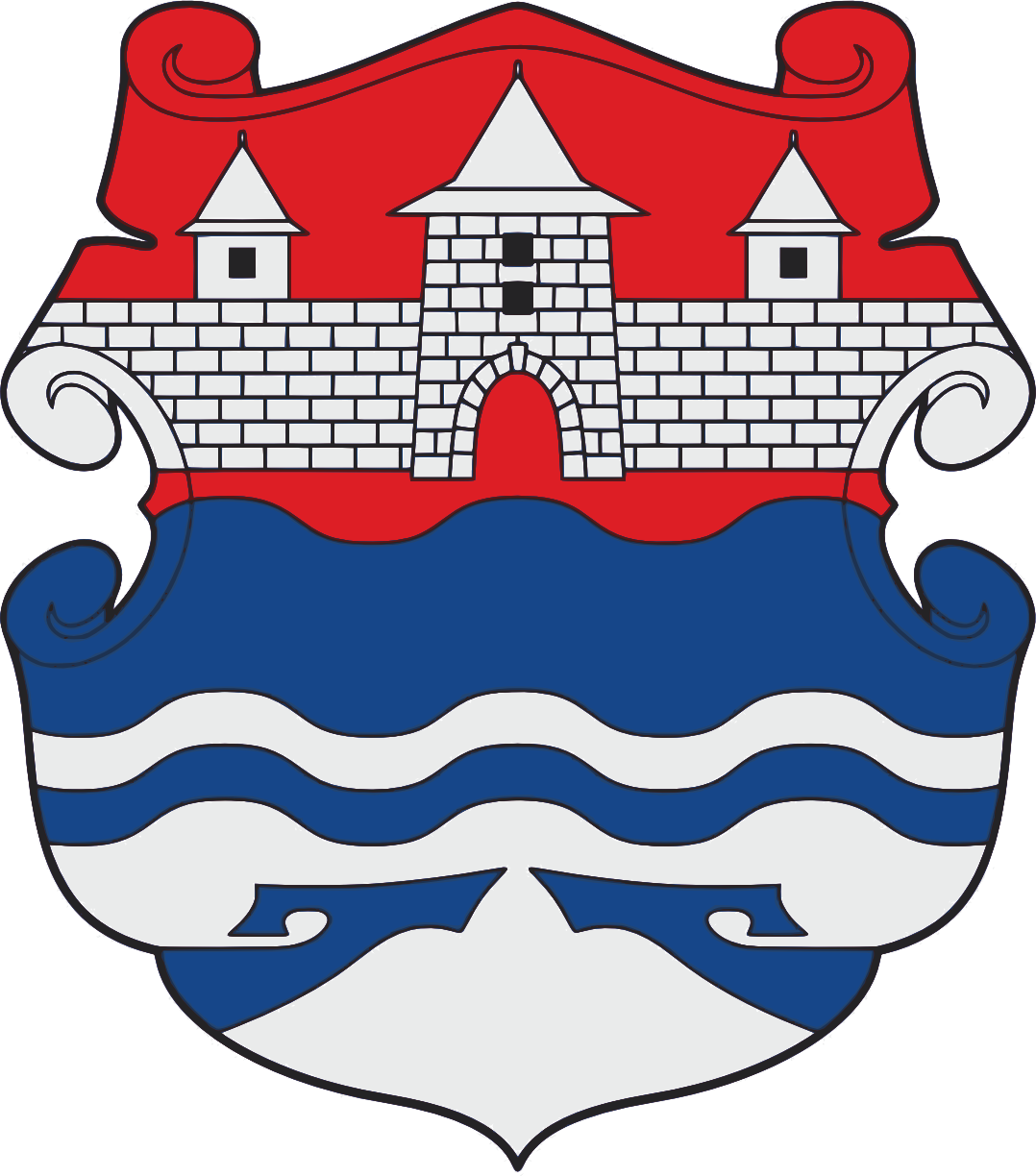
Current basic coat of arms by Acović

The color composition was, given that the content of the coat of arms was predetermined, the main contentious issue that needed to be resolved. According to Acović, considering the court's ruling, as well as the general political context in which the adoption process for the coat of arms took place, only two colors – red and blue – and both metals were acceptable to all under the given circumstances, specifically in the order as on the flag of Republika Srpska, i.e., in the broader sense of the Pan-Slavic colors — bearing in mind that all three constituent peoples share a common Slavic heritage. Other heraldic colors, such as black or green, were according to Acović unacceptable due to religious preferences or prejudices; purple was generally suspect to all due to its ideological potential; while furs were unacceptable due to unclear inferences regarding the emblematic or totemic understanding of the beast whose fur is depicted. The proposal for the coat of arms with the colors and order of the flag of Republika Srpska was later accepted by the commission and subsequently by the assembly, and as such went to a public debate.

Regarding the shield model, during consultations with the author, a wish was expressed that the form of the shield be Baroque. This form had a particularly favorable aesthetic effect on the appearance of the great coat of arms, given its somewhat standardized static composition. Taking all this into consideration, this proposal by Acović for the basic coat of arms was, with the unanimous support of the Commission, sent to a public debate – and ultimately, without any changes, adopted as the official basic coat of arms of the city.

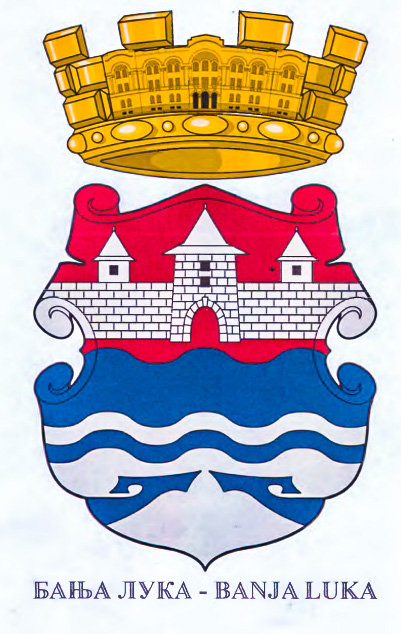
Proposal for the middle coat of arms by Acović

At the level of the middle coat of arms, the possibility of expanding the symbolic repertoire opened partially within the framework of Serbian heraldic norms, namely: through the wall crown, which marks the hierarchical rank and population size of the armiger, and through the floral wreath, as a closer visual and allusive reference to the armiger. Acović's proposal for the middle coat of arms primarily advocated the use of the wall crown. A golden wall crown with four visible merlons was proposed, as well as a golden diadem, symbolizing the size of the city and the fact that Banja Luka is the center of almost all entity-level, cultural, judicial, economic, and other structures of Republika Srpska. The core of the proposal consisted of integrating the eastern historical facade of Banski Dvor into the crown. Namely, as Acović states:

The referencing of the Banski Dvor building, as a significant monument of Banja Luka's emergence as an urban and political center, had already been present in some of the previous periods of the city's heraldic history, mostly in the form of a stylized roof cornice as the upper edge of the heraldic shield. This was deemed insufficient for aesthetic, heraldic, and even symbolic reasons, so a solution was sought in directly quoting the facade of the building. It was assessed that, following the model of the coat of arms of Bijeljina, this would best be accomplished by integrating the historical eastern facade of the Banski Dvor building with the merloned wall crown.

Acović also sketched alternative possibilities for the middle coat of arms that would contain different features such as a floral wreath, or a ribbon with the city's name, but these proposals were not part of the official proposal for the middle coat of arms that was adopted by the assembly and presented to the public.

Regarding the great coat of arms, the question of supporters of the shield was the main question that needed answering, given that these heraldic figures are symbolically significant, and give the entire heraldic composition additional ceremonial and historical context. Dragomir Acović decided on the following supporters, as well as their positioning in the coat of arms:

- The historical figures of Petar Kočić and Svetislav Milosavljević, with the preference of Kočić occupying the state (dexter) side, and Milosavljević the city (sinister) side;
- A pair of rampant wolves with the following secondary attributes: natural, gray, red, black, blue, silver, golden (with accompanying tertiary attributes of armament and tongues); or a combined pair: a rampant wolf and a rampant (or seated) badger; regarding the secondary attributes of the wolf as in the previous case, while for the badger only the natural color is admissible, with the preference of the badger occupying the state (dexter) side, and the wolf the city (sinister) side.

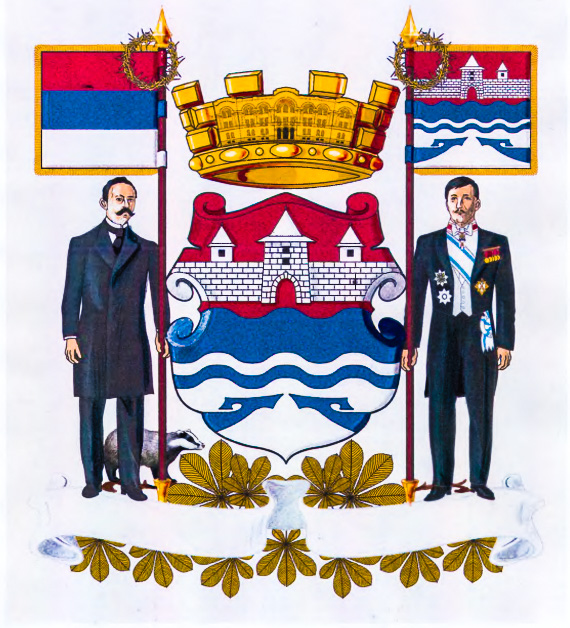
Proposal for the great coat of arms by Acović

As Acović notes, the stylization of the shield supporters (natural likenesses of Kočić and Milosavljević) was done according to the following model:

The faces are a simplified rendering based on a photograph (Petar Kočić) and a painted portrait by Š. Bocarić (Svetislav Milosavljević); the stature had to be leveled to the needs of the composition, unrelated to actual proportions or comparative anatomical differences between the supporters; this phenomenon is common in heraldry, and also applies to holder figures where natural differentiation by size cannot be tracked; the clothing is adapted to the emblematic function of the figure: Petar Kočić as a member of the emerging bourgeois class, dressed according to the social habitus at the turn of the centuries, and Svetislav Milosavljević as a senior state official, in a tailcoat and with decorations as testament to a meritorious military and civilian career.

Taking all this into account, Acović and artist Ljubodrag Grujić produced three variants of the great coat of arms, depicting each combination of supporters. The first of these three variants was, in a somewhat modified form, accepted as the official proposal for the great coat of arms of the city and as such went to a public debate.

The thus-defined coat of arms at three levels was, following the unanimous approval of the expert commission, voted on and adopted by the assembly and sent to a public debate. The then Mayor of Banja Luka, Igor Radojičić, in his desire for the proposal to be accepted by the public, addressed the public in an open letter published in Nezavisne novine and Glas Srpske, expressing his own support. At the session of the Banja Luka Assembly held on 20 July 2017, the proposal by Acović and Grujić for the city coat of arms was adopted as the official coat of arms. However, modifications were made before final adoption: the facade of Banski Dvor was removed from the wall crown of both the middle and the great coat of arms; the badger behind Petar Kočić and the ribbon with the city name were removed; and linden foliage was added alongside the existing chestnut foliage. Less than two months after the adoption of the coat of arms, the "Decision on the Use of the Symbols of the City" was also adopted, which forms the basis of the rules for the use and protection of city insignia.

== Gallery ==
Former flag of Banja Luka

Current flag of Banja Luka; the content of the flag is identical to the content of the shield of the basic coat of arms

== Bibliography ==
- Acović, Dragomir M. (2008). Heraldika i Srbi. Belgrade: Zavod za udžbenike. ISBN 978-86-17-15093-6. COBISS 152135692
- Acović, Dragomir; Grujić, Ljubodrag (2017). "Predlog grba grada Banjaluka" (PDF). Grad Banjaluka. Banja Luka. Archived from the original (PDF) on 26 October 2017.
- Acović, Dragomir (2017). "O grbu grada Banjaluka". Ocilo : Glasnik društva srpskih grbonosaca "Miloš Obilić". 5 (12). Belgrade: Društvo srpskih grbonosaca "Miloš Obilić": 4–12. ISSN 2560-4422. COBISS 240515596
- Duišin, Viktor Antun (1938). "Naš prilog za grb grada Banjaluke". Glasnik Heraldike : Grboslovlja, rodoslovlja, životopisa i pečatoslovlja. II/1-2. Zagreb: Heraldički zavod, (Zagreb : Štamparija Ivana Rosta). COBISS 52203532
- Kulenović, Nedim (2013). "Krinovi, krune, šahovska polja od vitalnog nacionalnog interesa". Puls demokratije – zajednica neistomišljenika, Zbornik tekstova (2): 10–14.
- Marlović, Srđan; Nikolić, Zoran (2015). "Приједлог за грб и заставу Бање Луке" (PDF). Grad Banjaluka. Banja Luka. Archived from the original (PDF) on 7 November 2017.
- Popović, Milan; Jovanović, Miloš (1979). Državni amblemi i druge javne oznake u SFRJ. Belgrade: Privredni pregled. COBISS 106579724
