= List of flags of Bosnia and Herzegovina =

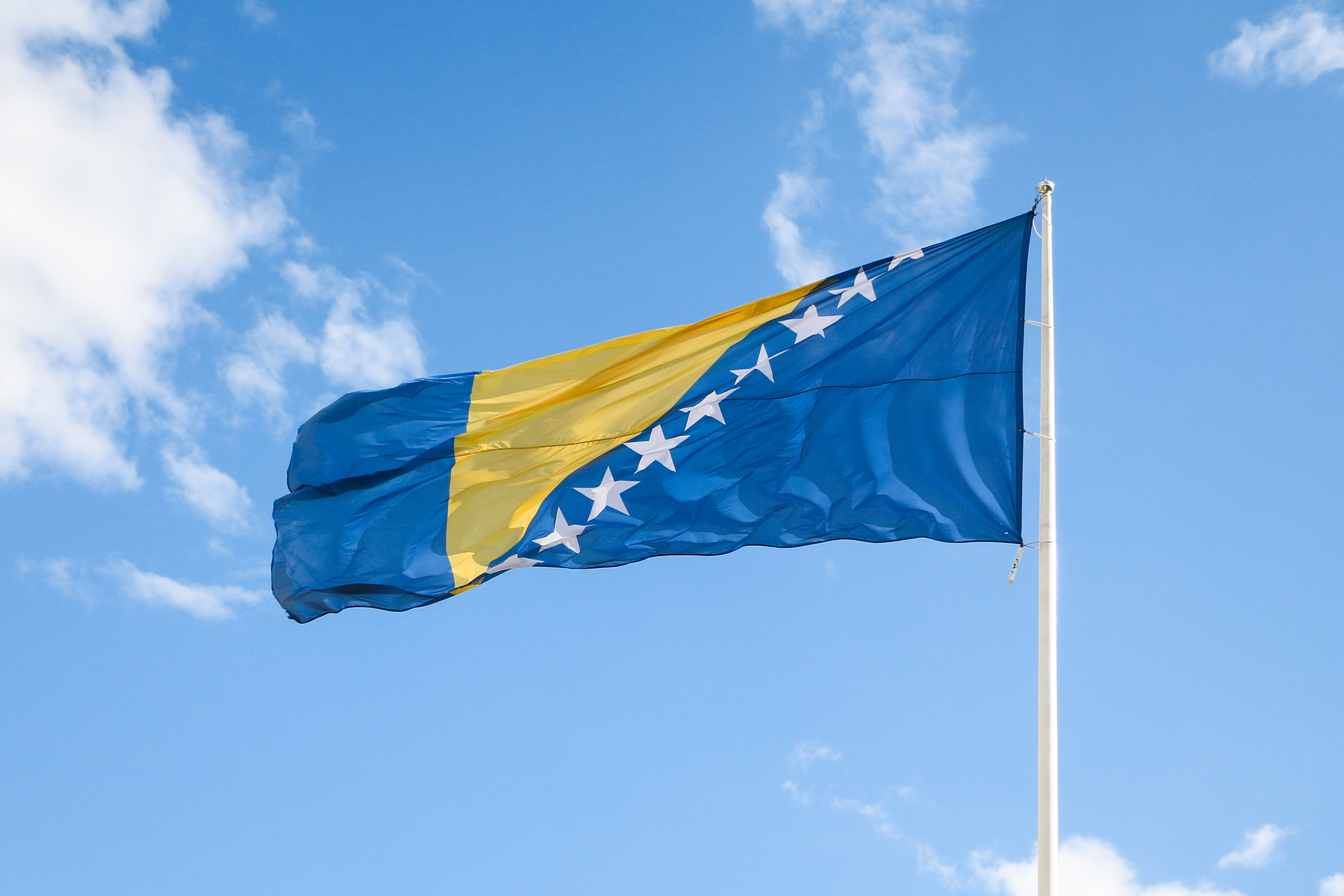
Flag of Bosnia and Herzegovina in the White Fortress, Sarajevo.

This is a list of flags used in Bosnia and Herzegovina. For more information about the national flag, visit the article Flag of Bosnia and Herzegovina.

== National flag ==
| Flag | Date | Use | Description |
|---|---|---|---|
| | 1998–present | Flag of Bosnia and Herzegovina | A blue field with a wide medium blue vertical band on the fly side with a yellow isosceles triangle abutting the band and the top edge of the flag. |
| | 1998–present | Flag of Bosnia and Herzegovina (displayed vertically) | (same as above, with the obverse side displayed and turned 90 degrees clockwise) |

== Subnational flags ==
=== Entities ===
| Flag | Date | Use | Description |
|---|---|---|---|
| | 1995–2007 | Former flag of the Federation of Bosnia and Herzegovina | A vertical tricolour of red (for the Bosnian Croats), white, and green (for the Bosniaks), with a coat of arms on the wide central band on which the green arms and golden fleur-de-lys represents the Bosniaks, and the checked shield the Bosnian Croats. The Constitutional Court of Bosnia and Herzegovina voted against the use of the current flag of the Federation declaring it unconstitutional. On 31 March 2007, the Constitutional Court placed its decision into the "Official Gazette of Bosnia and Herzegovina" officially removing the flag and coat of arms of Federation of Bosnia and Herzegovina. |
| | 1992–present | Flag of Republika Srpska | A horizontal tricolour of red, blue, and white. Based on the flag of Serbia but without the coat of arms and with slightly differently coloured shades, and is also used as the ethnic flag of Bosnian Serbs. Can also be compared to the flag of the Misiones Province in Argentina or a reversed flag of Russia. |

=== Districts ===
| Flag | Date | Use | Description |
|---|---|---|---|
| | 1998–present | Flag of Brčko District | Uses the flag of Bosnia and Herzegovina |

== Military flags ==
| Flag | Date | Use | Description |
|---|---|---|---|
| | 1992–1996 | Flag of Army of the Republic of Bosnia and Herzegovina | This flag of the Army of the Republic of Bosnia and Herzegovina was adopted in 1992. |
| | 1992–1996 | Flag of Croatian Defence Council | |
| | 1992–1996 | Flag of Police of Herzeg-Bosnia | |
| | 2004–present | Flag of Armed Forces of Bosnia and Herzegovina | Light blue with the flag of Bosnia and Herzegovina in the canton and the emblem of the Armed Forces of Bosnia and Herzegovina in the lower fly. |

== Cantons of the Federation ==
| Flag | Date | Use | Description |
|---|---|---|---|
| | 1999– | Flag of Una-Sana Canton | A horizontal tricolour of blue, white, and green, charged with the canton’s coat of arms near the hoist. |
| | 2000– | Flag of Posavina Canton | A horizontal unequal tricolour of red, white, and green, charged with the canton’s coat of arms in the centre. |
| | 1999– | Flag of Tuzla Canton | |
| | 2000– | Flag of Zenica-Doboj Canton | A horizontal unequal tricolour of green, white and red, charged with the canton’s coat of arms in the centre. |
| | 2001– | Flag of Bosnian-Podrinje Canton Goražde | A vertical bicolour of blue and yellow, charged with the canton's coat of arms in the centre. |
| | 2003– | Flag of Central Bosnia Canton | A horizontal unequal tricolour of red, white, and green, charged with the canton's coat of arms in the white band, shifted towards the hoist. |
| | 2004– | Flag of Herzegovina-Neretva Canton | |
| | 1996–1998 | Former flag of West Herzegovina Canton | Deemed unconstitutional by the Federation Constitutional Court in 1997 because "it only represented one group". Still used as an ethnic flag for Bosnian Croats. |
| | 1999– | Flag of Sarajevo Canton | |
| | 1996–1997 | Former flag of Canton 10 | Deemed unconstitutional by the Federation Constitutional Court in 1997 because "it only represented one group". Still used as an ethnic flag for Bosnian Croats. |

=== Former flags of the Cantons of the Federation ===
| Flag | Date | Use | Description |
|---|---|---|---|
| | 1997–1999 | Former Flag of Una-Sana Canton | |
| | 1996–2000 | Former Flag of Posavina Canton | |
| | 1996–1999 | Former Flag of Tuzla Canton | |
| | 1997–2000 | Former Flag of Zenica-Doboj Canton | |
| | 1997–2001 | Former Flag of Bosnian-Podrinje Canton Goražde | |
| | 1996–1998 | Former Flag of Sarajevo Canton | |
| | 1998–1999 | Former Flag of Sarajevo Canton | |

== Ethnic groups flags ==
| Flag | Date | Use | Description |
|---|---|---|---|
| | | Flag of Bosniaks | The main national flag of Bosniaks which was used from 1992 to 1995 as the flag of the Republic of Bosnia and Herzegovina. The republic remained composed of Bosniaks after the establishment of Republika Srpska and the Republic of Herzeg-Bosnia. |
| | | Flag of Bosniaks | Another flag representing Bosniaks, which is used less than the main ethnic flag. It has the green outline of a crescent moon (the main symbol of Islam) on a white stripe, with two smaller green stripes on the top and bottom. |
| | | Flag of Bosnian Serbs | The flag of the ethnic Bosnian Serbs with the Serbian tricolor (red, blue, and white). It is also the flag of Republika Srpska and is the traditional Serbian national flag. |
| | | Flag of Bosnian Croats | The flag of the ethnic Bosnian Croats. It is similar to the flag of Croatia with a difference in the emblem. It was also the flag of the Republic of Herzeg-Bosnia from 1992 to 1996. |

== Historical national flags ==
| Flag | Date | Use | Description |
Banate of Bosnia
| | c. 1354 | Flag of the Bosnian Banate. | Swallow-tailed, a blue field with a white cross pattée in the center. |
Kingdom of Bosnia
| | 1377–1463 | Royal Flag of Tvrtko I of Bosnia. | A white field with the arms of Bosnia in the center and a five-tongued fringe at the fly. |
Duchy of Saint Sava
| | 1448–1482 | Flag of Herzegovina | A red field with two white crosses pattée off-centred toward the hoist and a three-tongued fringe at the fly. |
Rama
| | 1618 | Banner used for "Rama" at Ferdinand II's coronation as King of Hungary. | Swallow-tailed, a blue field with a shield in the center. |
Ottoman Bosnia
| | 1831–1832 | Flag used during the Bosnian uprising against the Ottomans. | During the struggle for Bosnia's autonomy from September 1831 to June 1832, a new Bosnian flag was adopted under the leadership of Husein-Captain Gradašćević. At the beginning of 1832, Bosnia and Herzegovina was freed from Ottoman rule for a short time and independence was declared. The flag used from 1831 to 1832 was green with a yellow moon and a five-pointed star in the middle. The flag began to be used with the beginning of the struggle against the Ottoman authorities on September 14, 1830. |
Austro-Hungarian Bosnia
| | 1878–1908 | Flag of the Austro-Hungarian-occupied Province of Bosnia | A red and yellow horizontal bicolour with a shield. The Province of Herzegovina used a similar flag but with the colors reversed (a yellow and red bicolour). |
| | 1908–1918 | Flag of the Condominium of Bosnia and Herzegovina | |
Bosnia in Yugoslavia
| | 1944 | Flag of Bosnian-Herzegovinian Partisans | |
| | 1946–1992 | Flag of the Socialist Republic of Bosnia and Herzegovina within Yugoslavia | A red field (symbolizing the national liberation movements) with the Yugoslav flag in the canton. |
Independent Bosnia and Herzegovina
| | 1993–1995 | Flag of Autonomous Province of Western Bosnia and Republic of Western Bosnia | |
| | 1992–1998 | Flag of the Republic of Bosnia and Herzegovina | A white field with a blue shield bearing six Bosnian Golden Lilies in the centre. It also was and it still is the main Bosniak national flag. |

== Political flags ==
| Flag | Date | Party | Description |
|---|---|---|---|
| | | Alliance of Independent Social Democrats | |
| | | Party of Democratic Action | |
| | | Bosnian-Herzegovinian Patriotic Party | |
| | | Democratic Youth Movement | |
| | | Democratic People's Union | |
| | Until 1990 | League of Communists of Bosnia and Herzegovina | |

== Proposed flags ==
=== Proposals for the Socialist Republic of Bosnia and Herzegovina ===
| Flag | Date | Use | Description |
|---|---|---|---|
| | Proposed, never used | First proposal of a flag for the Socialist Republic of Bosnia and Herzegovina, 15 November 1946. | Federal flag of Yugoslavia with an additional five-pointed golden star imposed behind the existing red star, with their rays interchangeably positioned. |
| | Proposed, used in real life | Second proposal of a flag for the Socialist Republic of Bosnia and Herzegovina, 1947. | Variant of the flag adopted on 31 December 1946 with a much larger Yugoslav canton flag and a margin. |

=== Proposals before Dayton Agreement ===
| Flag | Date | Use | Description |
|---|---|---|---|
| | Proposed, never used | Bosnian tricolor proposal | |
| | Proposed, never used | Bosnian Democratic Union proposal | |
| | Proposed, never used | Defenders of Sarajevo proposal | |

=== First set of proposals ===
| Flag | Date | Use | Description |
|---|---|---|---|
| | Proposed, never used | First alternative in the first set of proposals. | Similar to the flag of the Czech Republic. A green and red horizontal bicolour with a blue triangle in the hoist. |
| | Proposed, never used | Second alternative in the first set of proposals. | Similar to the flag of the United Nations. A light blue field with a branch of wheat. |
| | Proposed, never used | Third alternative in the first set of proposals. | A blue field with an outline of the map of Bosnia and Herzegovina. |

=== Second set of proposals ===
| Flag | Date | Use | Description |
|---|---|---|---|
| | Proposed, never used | First alternative in the second set of proposals. | A red, white, and blue diagonal tricolour with a silhouette map of Bosnia and Herzegovina within a circle of 10 gold 5-pointed stars. |
| | Proposed, never used | Second alternative in the second set of proposals. | A red, white, and blue diagonal tricolour with a silhouette map of Bosnia and Herzegovina within a circle of 12 gold 5-pointed stars. |
| | Proposed, never used | Third alternative in the second set of proposals. | A red, white, and blue diagonal tricolour with a yellow silhouette map of Bosnia and Herzegovina outlined in green within two green olive branches. |
| | Proposed, never used | Fourth alternative in the second set of proposals. | A red, white, and blue tricolour with a yellow silhouette map of Bosnia and Herzegovina outlined in green within two green olive branches. |

=== Third set of proposals ===
| Flag | Date | Use | Description |
|---|---|---|---|
| | Proposed, used briefly in 1998 | First alternative in the third set of proposals (the Westendorp proposals). | Identical to the national flag that was adopted, but with a field of light blue that the flag of the United Nations uses. |
| | Proposed, never used | Second alternative in the third set of proposals (the Westendorp proposals). | A field of light blue that the flag of the United Nations uses with three gold and two white stripes, interleaved so as to form a rectangle in the centre. |
| | Proposed, never used | Third alternative in the third set of proposals (the Westendorp proposals). | A field of light blue that the flag of the United Nations uses with five gold and five white stripes, interleaved so as to form a triangle in the centre. |

== See also ==
- Flag of Bosnia and Herzegovina – main article on the Bosnian and Herzegovinian national flag
- Coat of arms of Bosnia and Herzegovina
- Flag of the Federation of Bosnia and Herzegovina
- Flag of Republika Srpska
