= Coat of arms of the Federation of Bosnia and Herzegovina =

There is currently no official coat of arms for the Federation of Bosnia and Herzegovina. The federation is part of the state of Bosnia and Herzegovina.

== Former coat of arms ==
Coat of arms of the Federation of Bosnia and Herzegovina
- Armiger: Federation of Bosnia and Herzegovina
- Adopted: 1996 (relinquished 2007)
- Shield: The coat of arms is in the shape of a shield. The shield is always outlined with a golden-yellow colour, except for the Croatian Coat of arms, which is outlined in red. The shield is separated into 2 halves in colour; white at the top, blue at the bottom. Besides that, it has 3 parts; the upper left part contains a fleur-de-lis contained in a field of green. In the upper right part is the historical Croatian coat of arms. In the lower half in a blue field are 10 six-pointed stars of white colour arranged in a circle. The coat of arms and also its upper and lower half are outlined with a stripe of golden-yellow colour.

The federation did have its own coat of arms between 1996 and 2007 when the flag and coat of arms of the Federation of Bosnia and Herzegovina were abolished by a decision made by the Constitutional Court of Bosnia and Herzegovina. The federation has not yet adopted a new flag or coat of arms, instead the symbols of the central state are used for official purposes as a provisional solution.

The green background and the golden fleur-de-lis represented the Bosniaks, while the chequy shield represented the Bosnian Croats. The ten stars arranged in a circle represented the 10 cantons of the Federation and there is a great resemblance to twelve-starred flag of Europe.

== See also ==
- Coat of arms of Bosnia and Herzegovina
- Flag of Bosnia and Herzegovina
- Flag of the Federation of Bosnia and Herzegovina
- Seal of Republika Srpska
