= 2016 Republika Srpska National Day referendum =

Republika Srpska National Day referendum
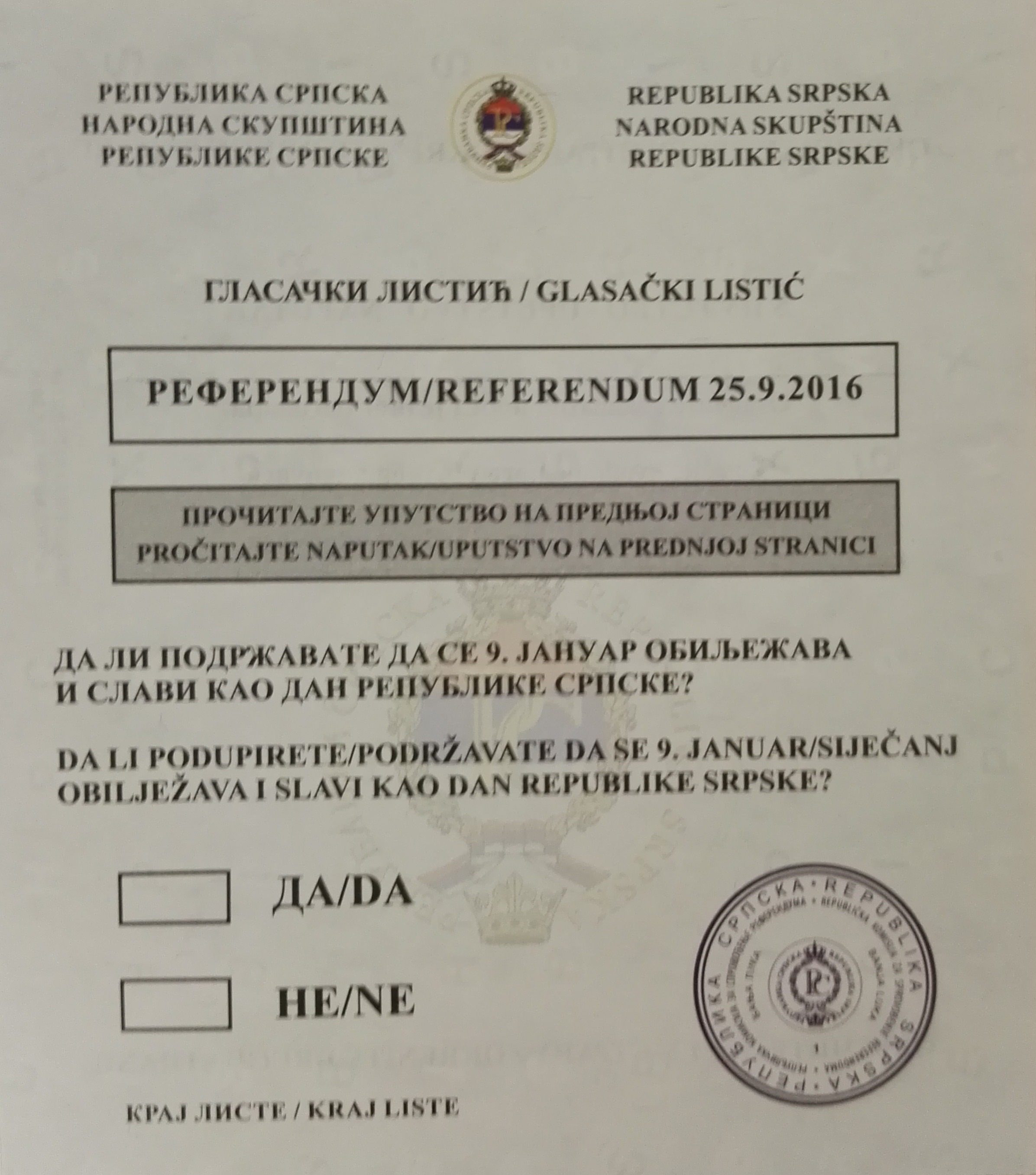

Results
Choice	Votes	%
Yes	677,721	99.81%
No	1,291	0.19%
Valid votes	679,012	99.84%
Invalid or blank votes	1,104	0.16%
Total votes	680,116	100.00%
Registered voters/turnout	1,219,399	55.77%

A referendum on the National Day of Republika Srpska, called the Day of Republika Srpska (Serbo-Croatian: Dan Republike Srpske or Dan RS; Дан Републике Српске or Дан РС) was held on 25 September 2016. The Constitutional Court of Bosnia and Herzegovina had on 26 November 2015 ruled against the constitutionality of the holiday, deeming it discriminatory against non-Serbs in the entity. The Day of Republika Srpska falls on 9 January, which is both an Orthodox feast day and the date when the Bosnian Serb republic was declared in 1992 although Serbian Orthodox Church venerates saints on each day in a year. The result was 99.8% in favour of keeping the date.

== Background ==
Since the declaration of Republika Srpska (formerly the Republic of the Serb people of Bosnia and Herzegovina) on 9 January 1992, the national day in the entity has been celebrated on that date. On 26 November 2015 the Constitutional Court of Bosnia and Herzegovina ruled against the constitutionality of the Republika Srpska National Day, held on 9 January, deeming it discriminatory against non-Serbs. The date marks the Orthodox day of St. Stephen (which is also the slava of Republika Srpska, St. Stephen being the patron saint), as well as the 1992 establishment of Republika Srpska as a breakaway entity of the then Republic of Bosnia and Herzegovina (itself seceding from SFR Yugoslavia). The Court gave six months to the Republika Srpska to establish a different entity holiday.

Republika Srpska authorities reacted by contesting the decision of the BiH Constitutional Court and calling for constitutional amendments within 120 days to get rid of international judges sitting in the Court, simultaneously calling for a popular referendum on whether Republika Srpska citizens support the decision of the Constitutional Court. Republika Srpska opposition leaders also joined Republika Srpska President Milorad Dodik in contesting the decision of the BiH Constitutional Court.

On 9 January 2016 Republika Srpska authorities celebrated the "unconstitutional" holiday, in spite of the Court ruling. Serbian PM Aleksandar Vučić also attended the event. Croat Republika Srpska MPs also supported the Republika Srpska Day and the referendum.

The Republika Srpska National Assembly passed a resolution on the referendum on 15 July 2016, with the backing of all Serb parties and the boycott of Bosniak Republika Srpska MPs. The Council for Protection of Vital National Interests of the Republika Srpska Constitutional Court in Banja Luka stated the decision would not endanger the "vital national interests" of the Bosniak people, thus not allowing them to veto it. Dodik confirmed that the referendum would be held on 25 September, one week before the planned local elections.

== Results ==
Do you agree that January 9 should be marked and celebrated as the Day of Republika Srpska?

Choice	Votes	%
For	677,721	99.81
Against	1,291	0.19
Total	679,012	100.00
Valid votes	679,012	99.84
Invalid/blank votes	1,104	0.16
Total votes	680,116	100.00
Registered voters/turnout	1,219,399	55.77
Source: Al Jazeera Balkans

== Reactions ==
=== International ===
The High Representative Valentin Inzko decried that, by going ahead with the referendum, Republika Srpska authorities are breaching the Dayton Agreement. Russia supported the referendum. Russian diplomat Sergey Lavrov has urged the international community not to increase tensions in the Balkans, and that the referendum bears no threat to the territorial integrity of BiH.

=== Domestic ===
ARBiH general Sefer Halilović threatened with conflict if the referendum was to be held. He spoke as if the referendum was in fact a secession referendum (see proposed secession of Republika Srpska). His comments were criticized by the head of Serbian diplomacy, Ivica Dačić, who said that the threats are of highest threat to peace and stability in the region. Upon the referendum, Bosniak member of the Bosnian Presidency Bakir Izetbegović stated that the international community would react, that the referendum is an example of breaching the Dayton Agreement, and then predicted Dodik's fall, likening with Saddam Hussein, Muammar Gaddafi and Slobodan Milošević.

Izetbegović said that "the one who gives blows to the state will receive response by the state". Goran Salihović, the Chief Prosecutor, has been suspended, reportedly due to the referendum. Dodik stated that the referendum only utilized the democratic right to express the opinion on the national holiday of Republika Srpska, and that the latest decision of the Constitutional Court of BiH, to lawfully abolish the Day, was directed by the Party of Democratic Action (SDA) and its people within the Constitutional Court.

President of the commission for the implementation of the referendum, Siniša Karan, has said that he will accept hearing in the inquiry of the Prosecution of BiH regarding contempt of the decision of the Constitutional Court of BiH. Dodik has stated that he will accept hearing only if it is held in Republika Srpska, and not in Sarajevo, as he fears for his life in the FBiH. Security minister Dragan Mektić stated that the State Investigation and Protection Agency (SIPA) could arrest Dodik if he does not accept hearing.

There has been criticism of the Constitutional Court regarding at least 76 decisions ignored by different institutions, organisations and individuals, despite that decisions are "formally binding".
