= Mladen Kolobarić =

Artist known for designing the Bosnian flag

Mladen Kolobarić (18 June 1933 – 2009) was a Bosnian painter and graphic designer, known for designing the current flag of Bosnia and Herzegovina.

== Life ==
Kolobarić was born in Mostar and graduated from the Academy of Applied Arts in Belgrade in 1958. He was a professor at the Sarajevo Art High School from 1959 to 1974 and a professor and head of the graphic design department at the Academy of Fine Arts in Sarajevo from 1974 to 2004.

Kolobarić was the art director of the 1984 Winter Olympics in Sarajevo.

Construction sheet for the flag of Bosnia and Herzegovina

He was the head of the so-called Westendorp Commission and thus the creator of the national flag of Bosnia and Herzegovina. Carlos Westendorp was High Representative for Bosnia and Herzegovina from 1997 to 1999.

Throughout his professional career, Mladen Kolobarić has exhibited numerous times in the former Yugoslavia. He has illustrated many books and newspapers and received several state awards. Before his death, Kolobarić became a member of the Association of Applied Arts and Design in Bosnia and Herzegovina (ULUPUBiH).

== Death ==
Kolobarić died in 2009 in Sarajevo.
