= Day of Republika Srpska =

Public holiday in Bosnia and Herzegovina

Day of the Republic
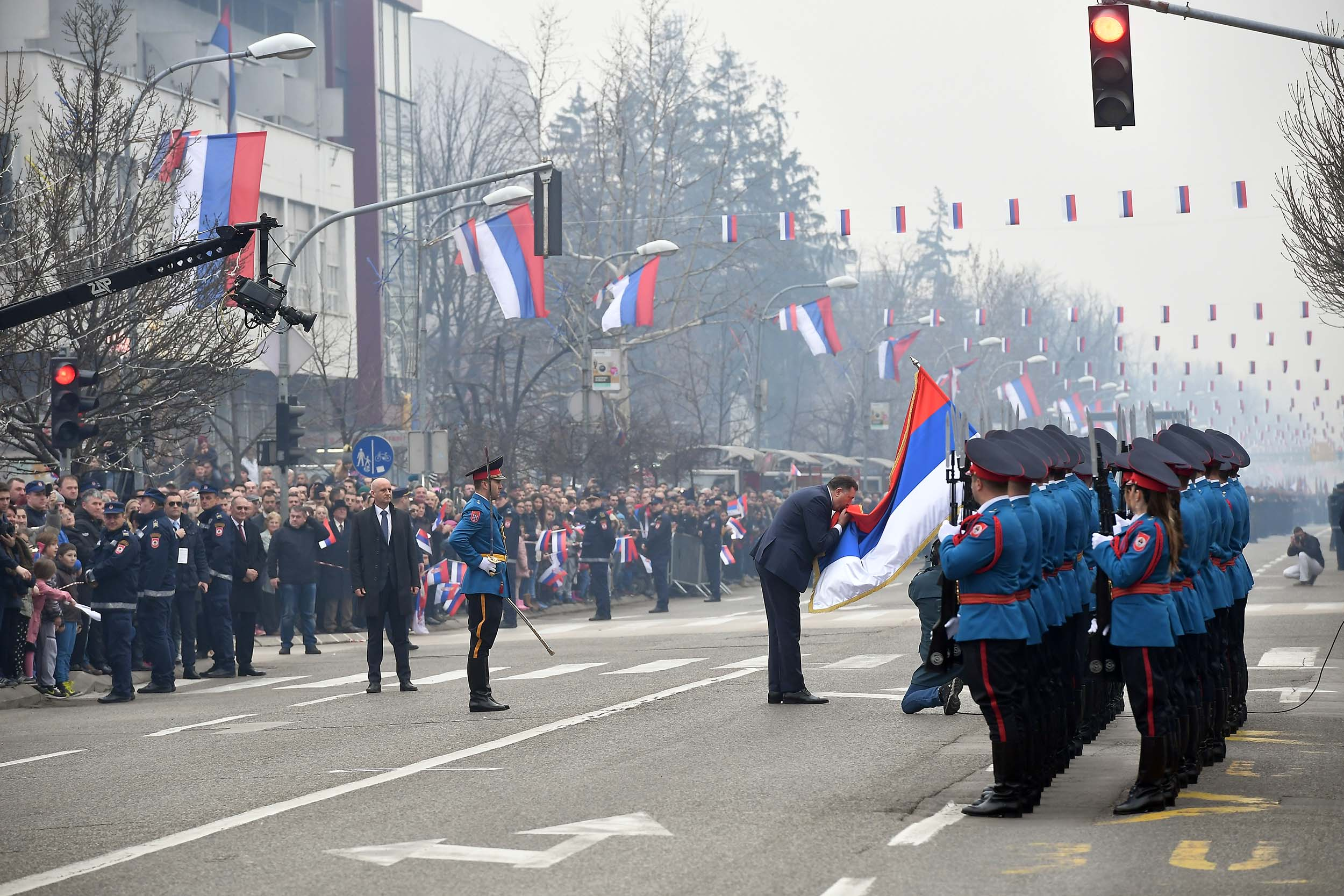
- President Milorad Dodik kissing the flag in front of the honour guard during the national day, 2018
- Official name: Proclamation of Serb Republic of Bosnia and Herzegovina
- Also called: Saint Stephen's Day
- Observed by: Republika Srpska
- Date: January 9
- Next time: 9 January 2026
- Frequency: annual

Day of Republika Srpska (Serbian: Дан Републике Српске, romanized: Dan Republike Srpske) is a formerly official national holiday of the Republika Srpska, which has been proclaimed unconstitutional by the Constitutional Court of Bosnia and Herzegovina. The holiday is celebrated on 9 January, and its unofficial patron saint is Saint Archdeacon Stephen—historically being patron saint of medieval Kotromanić dynasty kings bearing their first name after him—which falls on the same day.

== 9 January 1992 ==
On 9 January 1992 in Sarajevo, the constitutional Assembly of the Serbian people in Bosnia and Herzegovina issued the Declaration of the proclamation of the Republic of Serbian people of Bosnia and Herzegovina, with a main goal of seceding from Republic of Bosnia and Herzegovina which after the war continued its existence as Bosnia and Herzegovina. The republic has been proclaimed on the territories of Serb Autonomous Regions, including the areas where Serbs were constituting a relative majority.

== After 2015 constitutional ban ==
The Constitutional Court of Bosnia and Herzegovina declared the holiday unconstitutional on 26 November 2015, stating that the main issue for it being coinciding with a religious holiday. The ruling was ignored by the Republika Srpska government.

On 25 September 2016, a referendum, also proclaimed unconstitutional by the Constitutional Court, was held concerning the topic was held.

As recently as 2025, participants took part in celebrating the disputed Day of Republika Srpska, ignoring condemnation from Bosniak leaders and a ban imposed by the country's Constitutional Court. Despite the court ruling that the holiday was unconstitutional, and fierce criticism by Bosniaks and part of the international community, celebrations took place throughout Republika Srpska, including parades and performances.

== See also ==
- 2016 Republika Srpska National Day referendum
