= Emblem of Republika Srpska =

Emblem of Republika Srpska Република Српска
- Armiger: Republika Srpska
- Adopted: 2007
- Shield: РС, stands for Република Српска
- Other elements: Oak leaves and Crowns

The Emblem of Republika Srpska contains the flag of Republika Srpska and the Cyrillic letters "РС" ("RS") with the red-blue-white tricolor in the center of the emblem, twisted with golden oak leaves, a traditional pre-Christian symbol sacred to most Slavs. On the edge of the emblem there is an inscription Republika Srpska (in Cyrillic and Latin). The open crown of Kotromanić is shown in the bottom of the emblem and the emblem itself is topped with a heraldic royal crown.

== Former coat of arms ==
The former coat of arms of Republika Srpska showed, on a red shield, over headed by the Nemanjić crown, a bicephalic silver eagle in take off, armed with gold, with golden tongue and legs, the chest covered by a red shield with the Serbian cross, a silver cross with four firesteels.

Former coat of arms of Republika Srpska (1992–2007)

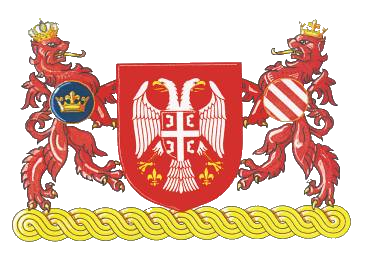
Unconstitutional coat of arms of Republika Srpska

=== Decision of the Constitutional Court of Bosnia and Herzegovina ===
On 12 April 2004, Sulejman Tihić, then Chairman of the Presidency of Bosnia and Herzegovina, filed a request with the Constitutional Court of Bosnia and Herzegovina for the review of constitutionality of Articles 1 and 2 of the Law on the Coat of Arms and Flag of the Federation of Bosnia and Herzegovina (Official Gazette of Federation of BiH No. 21/96 and 26/96), Articles 1, 2 and 3 of the Constitutional Law on the Flag, Coat of Arms and Anthem of the Republika Srpska (Official Gazette of the Republika Srpska No. 19/92), Articles 2 and 3 of the Law on the Use of Flag, Coat of Arms and Anthem (Official Gazette of the Republika Srpska No. 4/93) and Articles 1 and 2 of the Law on the Family Patron-Saint's Days and Church Holidays of the Republika Srpska (Official Gazette of Republika Srpska No. 19/92). On 2 December 2004 the applicant submitted a supplement to the request. Two partial decisions were made in 2006, when the court found that the coat of arms and flag of the Federation of B&H, and coat of arms, anthem, family patron-saint days and church holidays of Republika Srpska were unconstitutional. In its decision, among other things, the court stated:

The Constitutional Court concludes that it is the legitimate right of the Bosniak and Croat people in the Federation of BiH and the Serb people in the Republika Srpska to preserve their tradition, culture and identity through legislative mechanisms, but an equal right must be given to the Serb people in the Federation of BiH and Bosniak and Croat peoples in Republika Srpska and other citizens of Bosnia and Herzegovina. The Constitutional Court further holds that it cannot consider as reasonable and justified the fact that any of the constituent peoples has a privileged position in preservation of tradition, culture and identity as all three constituent peoples and other citizens of Bosnia and Herzegovina enjoy the rights and fulfil obligations in the same manner as provided for in the Constitution of Bosnia and Herzegovina and Constitutions of the Entities. Moreover, it is of a particular importance the fact that the identity of the constituent peoples, education, religion, language, fostering culture, tradition and cultural heritage are defined in the Constitution of the Federation of BiH and Constitution of the Republika Srpska, as the vital national interests of the constituent peoples.

The formal name of the item is U-4/04, but it is widely known as "Decision on the insignia of entities" (Bosnian: Odluka o obilježjima entiteta), since its merritum was about the symbols of entities. The court has ordered the Parliament of the Federation of Bosnia and Herzegovina and the National Assembly of Republika Srpska to bring the contested legal documents in line with the Constitution of Bosnia and Herzegovina within six months from the publishing date of its decision in the Official Gazette of Bosnia and Herzegovina. Since the harmonisation was not done in that granted time-limit, that court has, on January 27, 2007, adopted the Ruling on failure to enforce in which it established that the contested articles of the interpreted legal documents shall cease to be in force as of the date following the publishing date of the Ruling in Official Gazette of Bosnia and Herzegovina. On June 16, 2007, the Government of Republika Srpska had adopted the provisional emblem of Republika Srpska, until it adopted the new coat of arms of Republika Srpska.

It had also decided to use the melody of its former anthem "Bože pravde" as its new intermezzo anthem, but the Constitutional Court of Republika Srpska has declared such use of melody as unconstitutional as well, so the new anthem, "Moja Republika" was adopted. Both the new anthem (in relation to words moja zemlja - "my land") and new coat of arms have been contested by Bosniak members of National Assembly of Republika Srpska in front of the Constitutional Court of Republika Srpska. The court declared the coat of arms to be unconstitutional since it did not represent Bosniaks in any way, while it rejected the claim in relation to the anthem.

== See also ==
- Flag of Republika Srpska
- Flag of Bosnia and Herzegovina
- Coat of arms of Bosnia and Herzegovina
- Coat of arms of the Federation of Bosnia and Herzegovina
- Coat of arms of Serbia
