= Coat of arms of Bosnia and Herzegovina =

Versions
- The banner of arms, which serves as national flag
- Armiger: Bosnia and Herzegovina
- Adopted: 18 May 1998
- Shield: Per bend: 1st Or, 2nd Azure seven mullets in bend Argent

The coat of arms of Bosnia and Herzegovina was adopted in 1998, replacing the previous design that had been in use since 1992 when Bosnia and Herzegovina gained independence. It follows the design of the national flag. The three-pointed shield is used to symbolize the three major ethnic groups of Bosnia, as well as allude to the shape of the country.

== Historic arms ==
One of the early representations of coats of arms attributed to Bosnia come from the Fojnica Armorial, which was completed in 17th century. The Fojnica arms are shown upon a gold shield, two black ragged staffs are crossed in saltire with two Moor's heads surmounting the upper portion of each staff. Overall is a red escutcheon that was charged with an eight-pointed star and crescent. In the past centuries, European sources have attributed arms to Bosnia that were close or full analogue to this depiction.

Coat of arms of the Kingdom of Bosnia

The fleurs-de-lis was the symbol of the House of Kotromanić, a ruling house in medieval Bosnia during the medieval Kingdom of Bosnia, adopted by the first Bosnian king, Tvrtko I in recognition of the Capetian House of Anjou support in assuming the throne of Bosnia. The coat of arms contained six fleurs-de-lis,^{[h]} where the flower itself is today interpreted by some to be a representation of the autochthonous golden lily, Lilium bosniacum. The emblem was revived in 1992 as a national symbol of the Republic of Bosnia and Herzegovina and was part of the flag of Bosnia-Herzegovina from 1992 to 1998.

After Herzegovina and Bosnia were occupied by the Austrian-Hungarian Empire in 1878, both condominia received arms from the Empire. The heraldic achievement of Hrvoje Vukčić Hrvatinić served as inspiration, who was a fifteenth-century nobleman that ruled over the region as Grand Duke of Bosnia and Herzeg of Split. His armorial bearings displayed both a red armoured arm brandishing a sword and a red lion rampant upon a white shield, with two red bars running across the chief. Herzegovina would be given a red shield with a bare arm holding a broken lance for its coat of arms in this same fashion. The coat of arms of Bosnia would be gold with a red armoured arm issuing out of clouds, brandishing a sword. Though both condominia fell under the crown of Hungary, only Bosnia would be included in the greater arms of the Hungarian Kings.

In the nineteenth century, the nationalist movement that had risen against both the former Ottoman rule and contemporary Austro-Hungarian occupation temporarily revived the arms from the Fojnica armorial.

Fojnica Armorial
17th century. A similar coat of arms is shown in the Korenić-Neorić Armorial (1595).

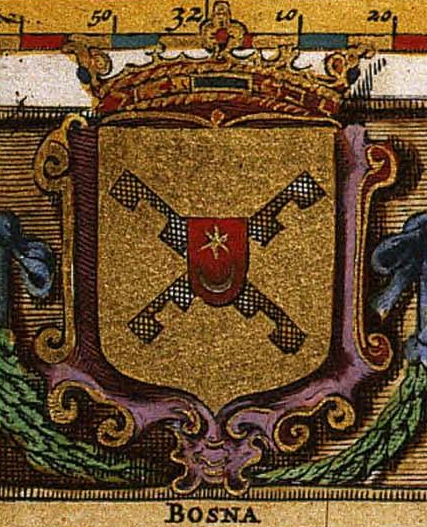
Joan Blaeu
1668

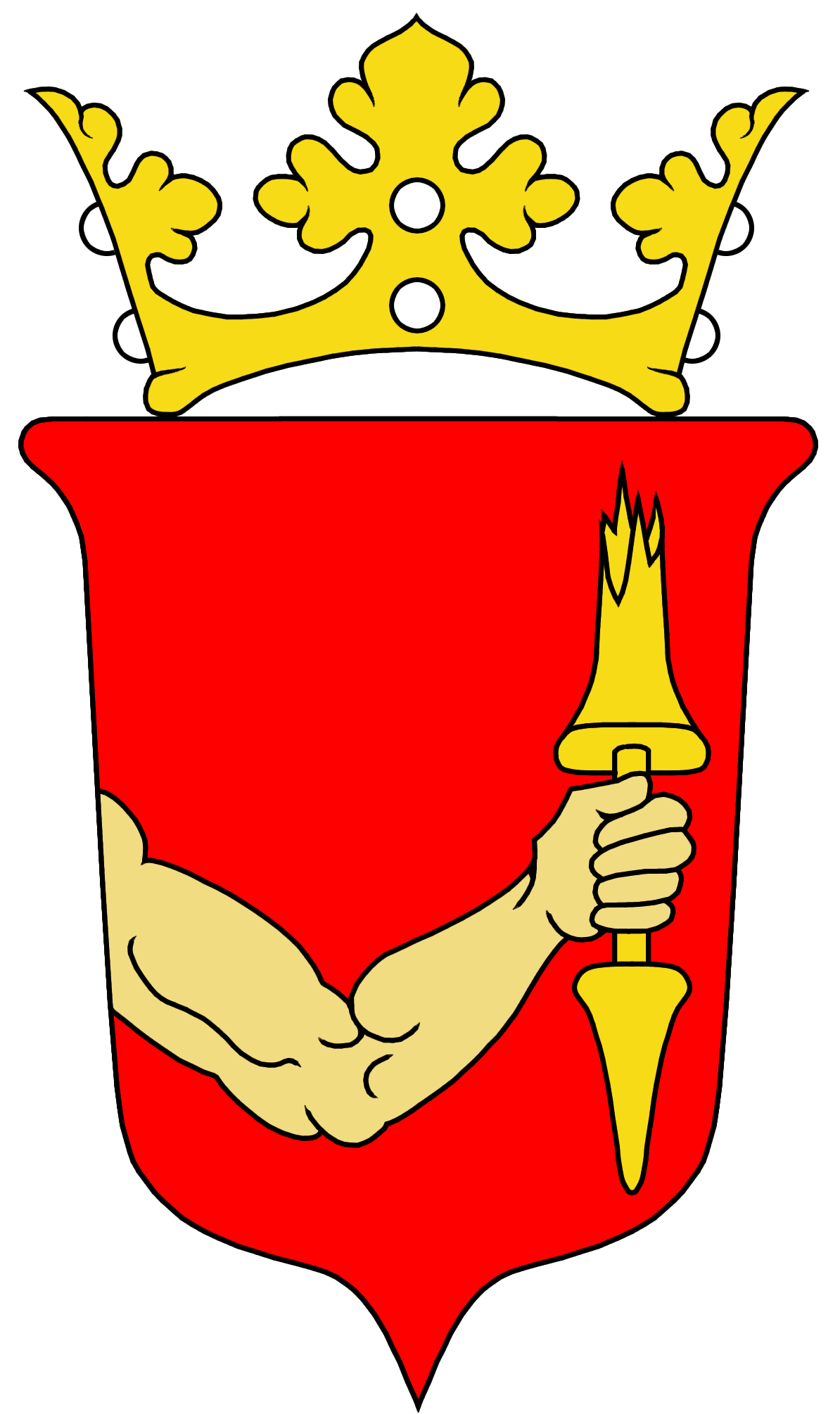
A proposed coat of arms for Herzegovina that was never officially adopted.
late 19th century

Austro-Hungarian condominium of Bosnia and Herzegovina
1878–1918

== Communist era ==
Emblem of the Socialist Republic of Bosnia and Herzegovina during the Yugoslav period.

The emblem, along with the flag, of the socialist Republic of Bosnia and Herzegovina was adopted on 31 December 1946. The description of the emblem was similar to those of the other Yugoslav republics. The device had two crossing stems of wheat in front of the silhouette of the town of Jajce, with two factory chimneys out of which there is smoke. Around the decorative branches and wheat, there is a red track that spirals around. At the top of the emblem is a red star with a golden frame. The red star symbolizes the communism of Yugoslavia at that time.

The device represents the industry Bosnia and Herzegovina had at the time. The factory chimneys show the industry of several important Bosnian, then Yugoslav, towns and their vital influence on the economy. All of the Yugoslav republics had similar emblems, but that of Bosnia and Herzegovina was the only one that did not portray nationalistic symbols, representing its multiethnic composition.

The national emblem of the Socialist Republic of Bosnia and Herzegovina was exactly the same as the previous one of the People's Republic of Bosnia and Herzegovina and defined in its Constitution. This was the first emblem ever in the history of both regions of Herzegovina and Bosnia that was specific to the entire modern country of Bosnia and Herzegovina.

== Modern arms ==
Coat of arms used from 1992 until 1998, taken from the coat of arms of Bosnian King Tvrtko I Kotromanić.

The coat of arms of the Republic of Bosnia and Herzegovina was adopted on 4 May 1992 and is aesthetically similar to that of the Kotromanić dynasty. It had a blue background divided by a diagonal white line (called bendlet or riband in heraldry). The diagonal white line is supposed to symbolize the sword of Tvrtko and his might as a ruler. The coat of arms was designed in a hurry, right at the beginning of the Bosnian War, which lasted for three years. At the end of the war, there came uproar from the Bosnian Serbs arguing that the coat of arms solely represented Bosniaks. The international community, represented in Bosnia and Herzegovina through the High Representative for Bosnia and Herzegovina, was the instrument to solve the controversy. In early 1998, a commission for the flag change was created and the same year the current coat of arms was adopted in order to help alleviate the tensions among the country's various ethnicities.

=== Official description ===
The official description of the coat of arms is as follows:

The coat of arms of Bosnia and Herzegovina is blue and in shape of a shield with a pointed end. In the upper right corner of the shield is located a yellow triangle. Parallel to the left side of the triangle stretches a row of white five-pointed stars.

== Gallery ==
Coat of arms of Tvrtko I as Ban of Bosnia

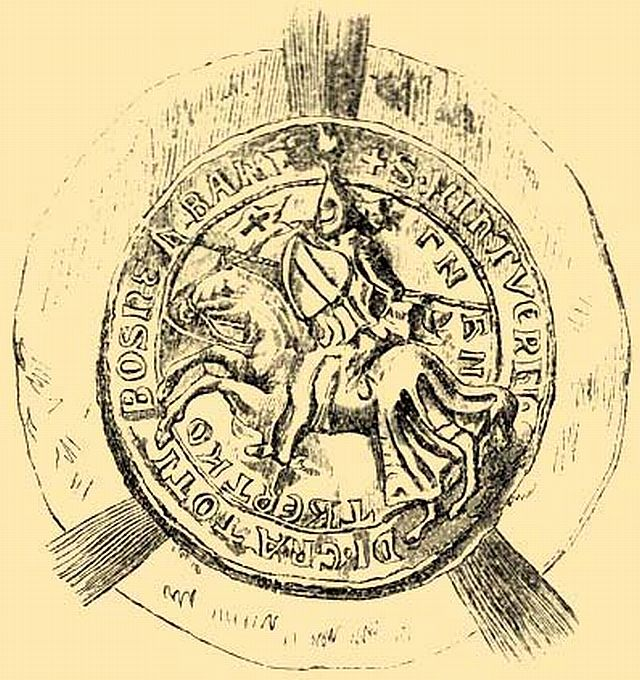
Seal of Tvrtko I, with his coat of arms as Ban

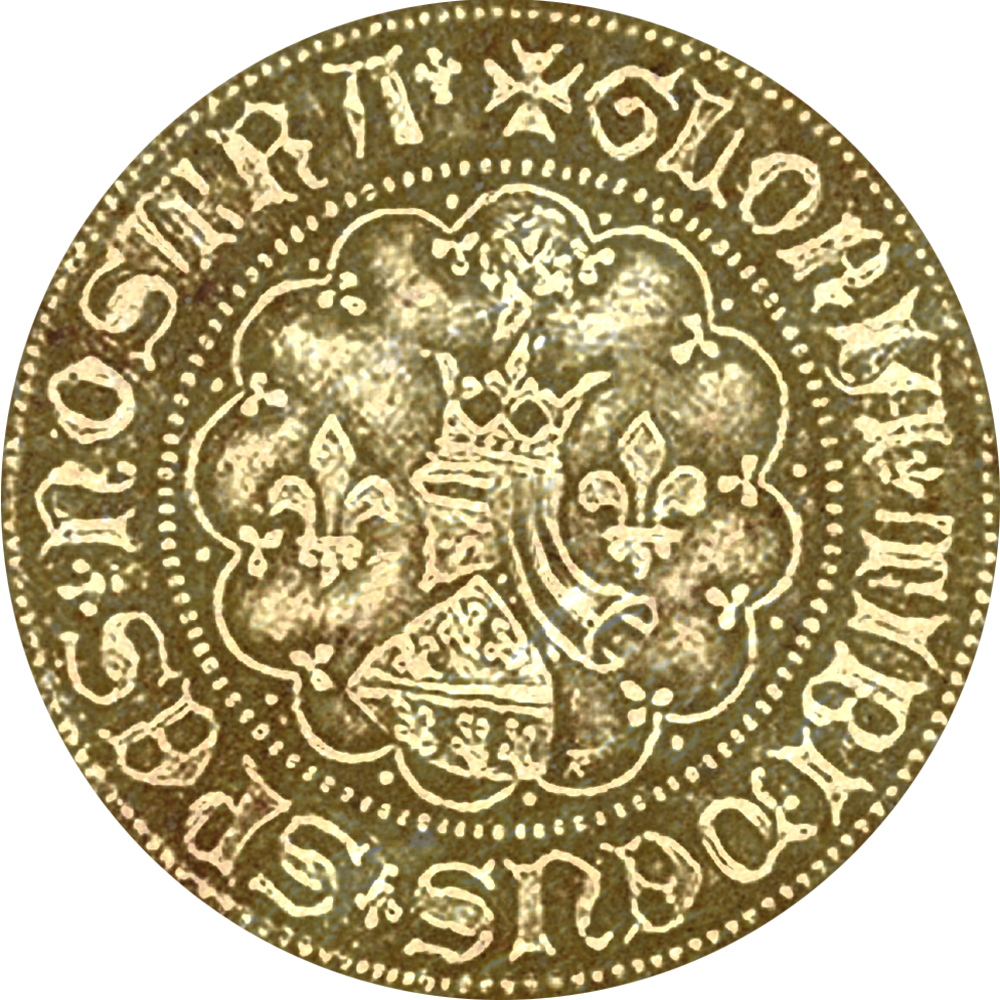
Coat of arms of the Kingdom of Bosnia, featured on a coin issued by Tvrtko I

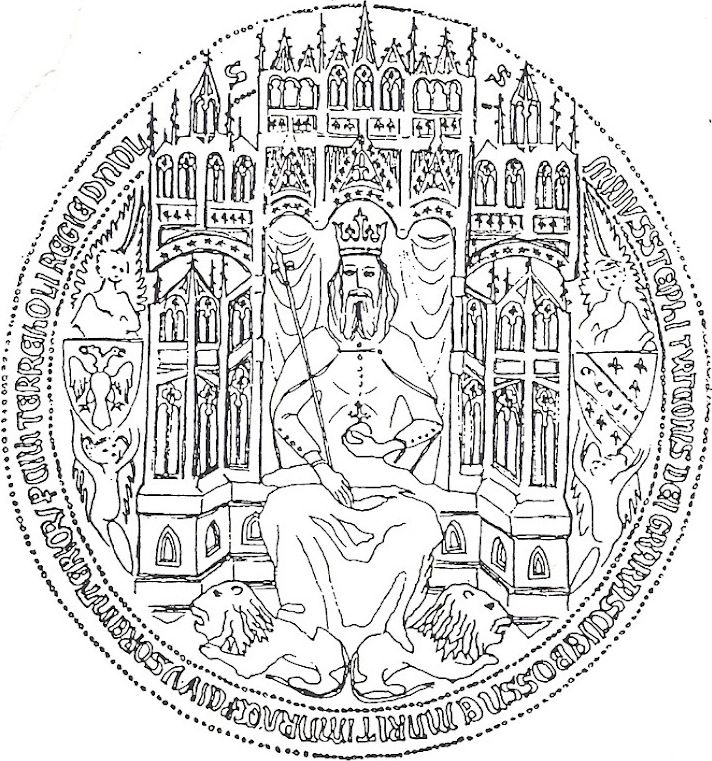
Seal of Tvrtko I, with the Bosnian coat of arms on the right

Coat of arms used by Tvrtko II

Other version of the coat of arms used by Tvrtko II, featuring the Bosnian Cyrillic letter "T"

Coat of arms used by Stephen Tomašević

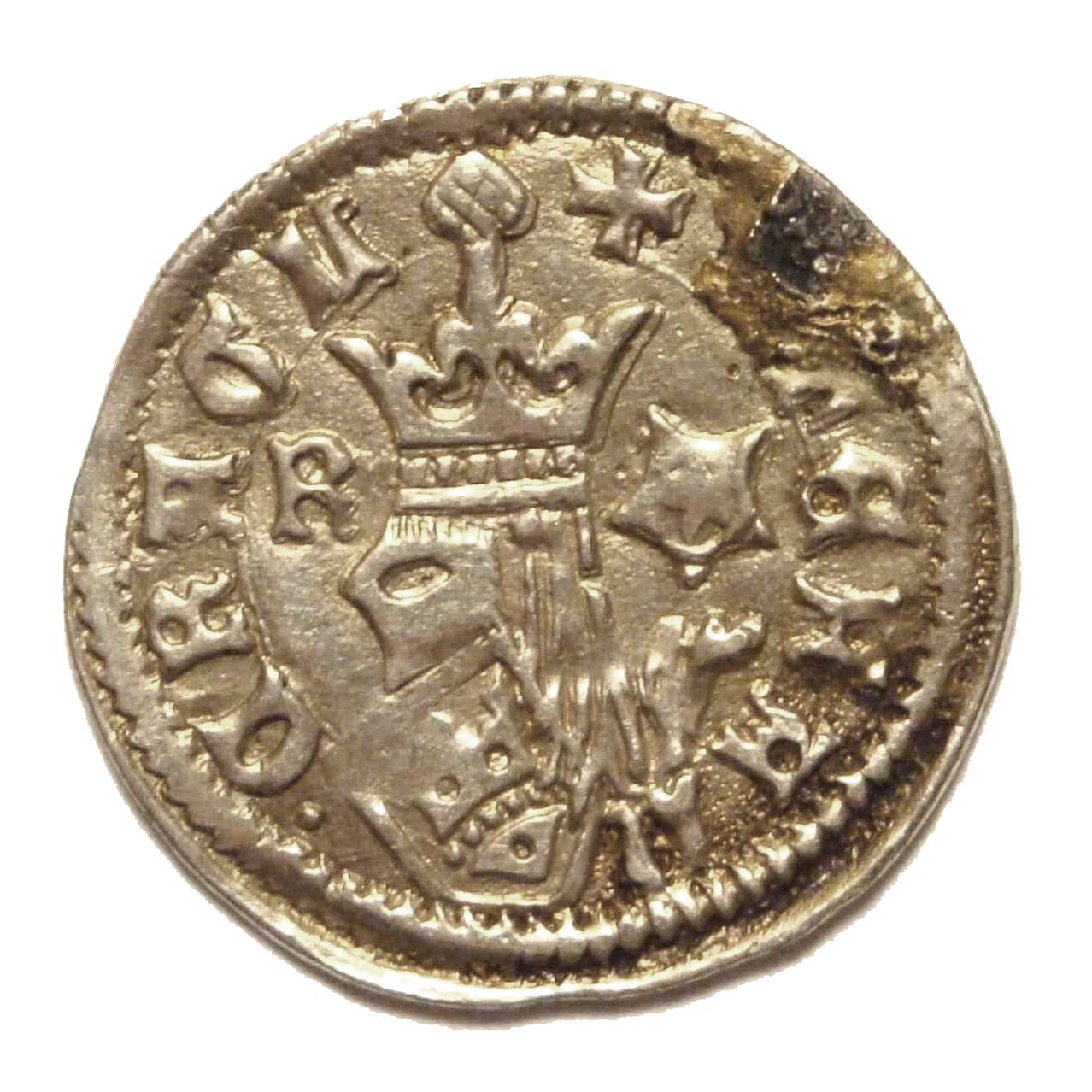
Coin issued by Stephen Tomašević featuring his coat of arms

Coat of arms used by Stephen Tomašević, with his monogram

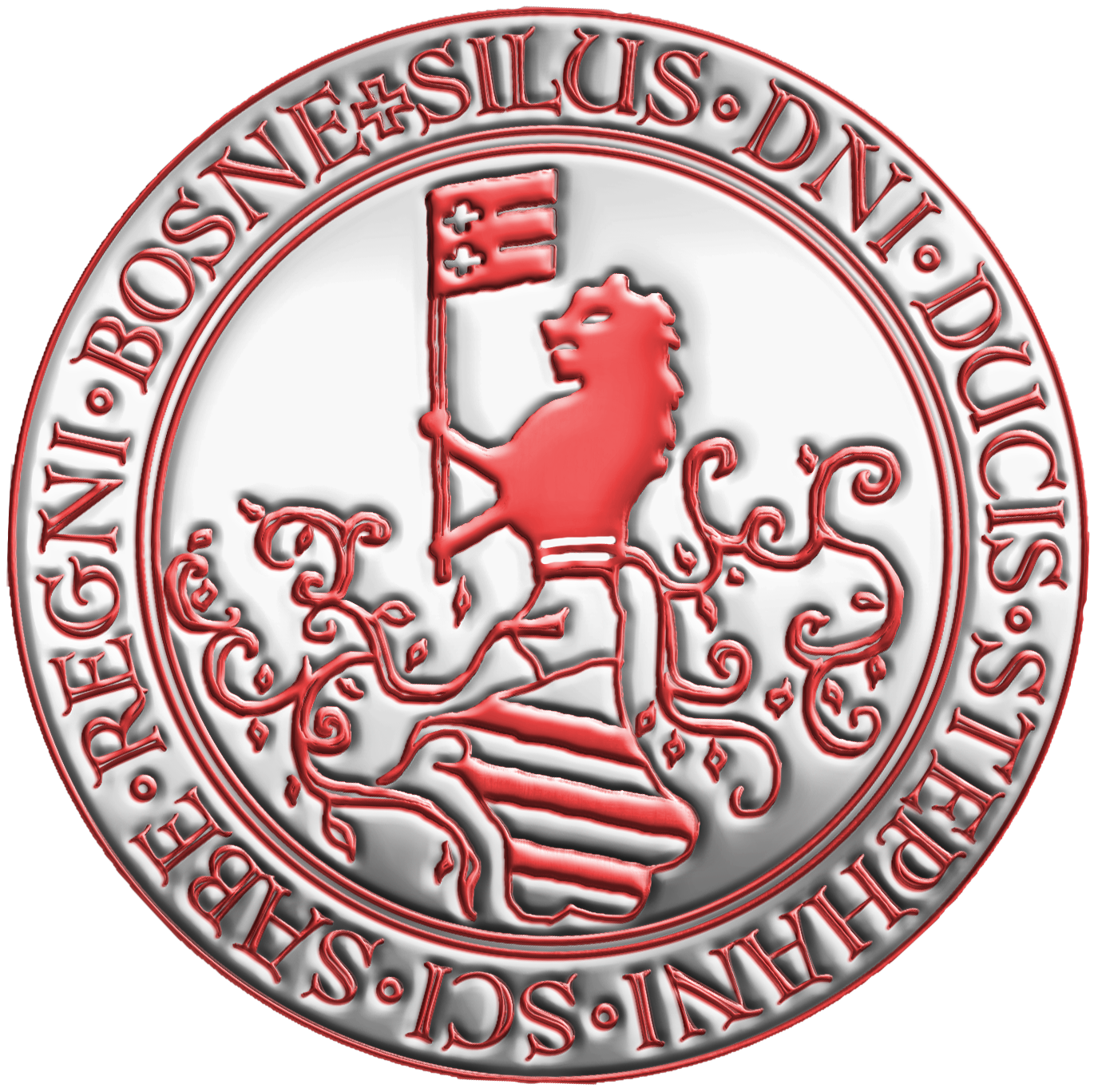
Seal of Stjepan Vukčić Kosača

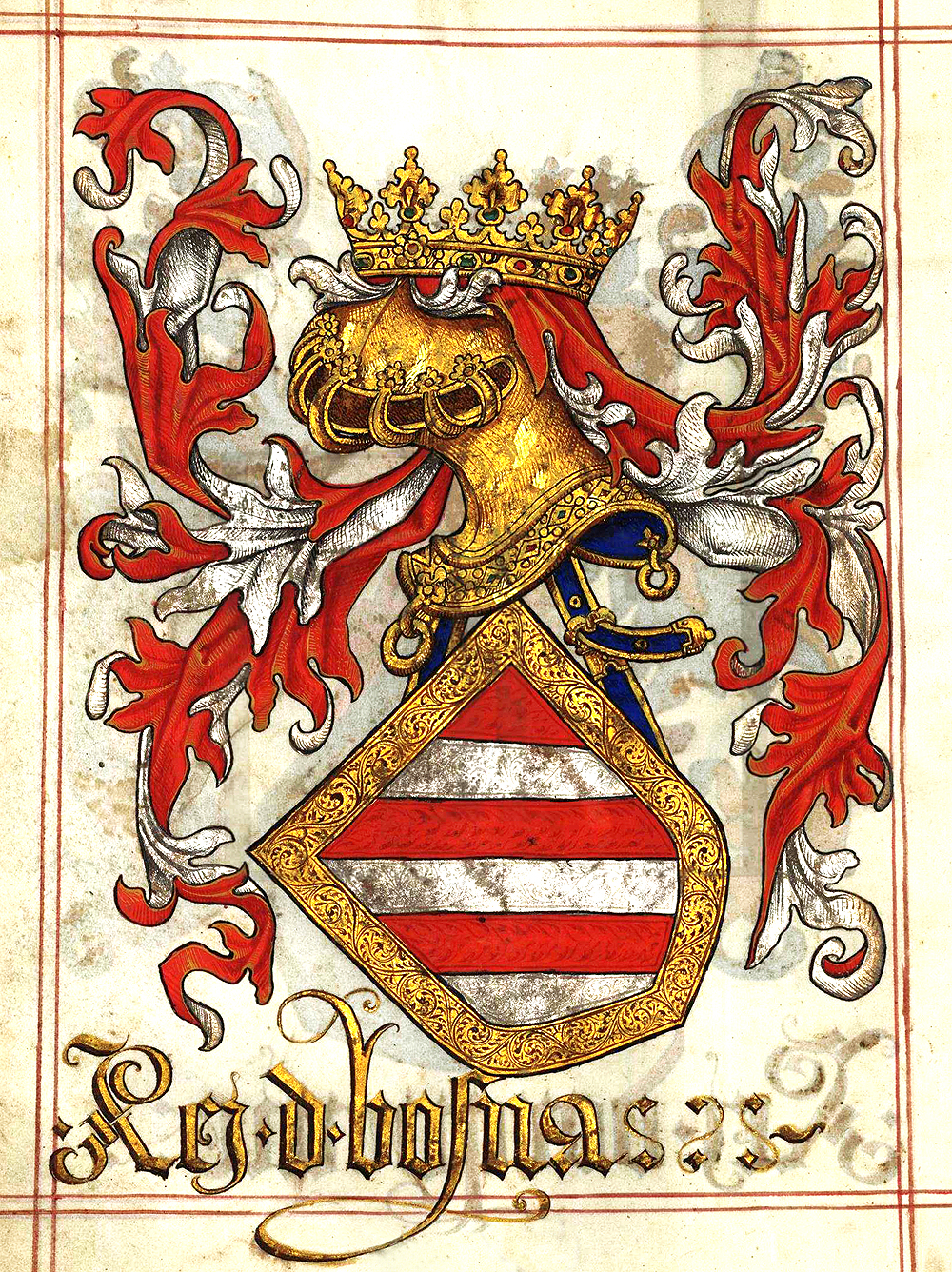
Coat of arms of the "King of Bosnia" in the Livro do Armeiro-Mor. Actually the arms of the Duchy of Saint Sava

== See also ==
- Coat of arms of Herzeg-Bosnia
- Coat of arms of the Federation of Bosnia and Herzegovina, for the sub-national entity's coat of arms
- Seal of Republika Srpska, for the sub-national entity's emblem
