= Flag of the Federation of Bosnia and Herzegovina =

Flag of the Bosnian entity of the Federation of Bosnia and Herzegovina

There is currently no official flag for the Federation of Bosnia and Herzegovina. The federation is part of the state of Bosnia and Herzegovina. The federation adopted its own flag in 1996, but the flag and associated coat of arms were deemed unconstitutional by the Constitutional Court of Bosnia and Herzegovina in 2007 and now it is considered to be a "de facto" flag. The federation has not yet adopted a new flag, anthem or coat of arms; instead the symbols of the central state are used for official purposes as a provisional solution.

== Former flag of the Federation of Bosnia and Herzegovina (1996–2007) ==
Federation of Bosnia and Herzegovina
- Use: Regional flag
- Proportion: 3:5
- Adopted: 5 November 1996
- Relinquished: 14 June 2007
- Design: A rectangular tricolour with vertically ordered fields of red, white and green colour (left to right) and the coat of arms in the middle of white field. The proportion of the flag is 3:5, the proportions of vertical fields are 1:3:1.

A flag was adopted by the Federation of Bosnia and Herzegovina on 5 November 1996. On the flag, green stood for the Bosniaks and red for the Bosnian Croats. The same went for the coat of arms, whereon the green arms and golden fleur-de-lis stood for the Bosniaks and the chequy shield for Bosnian Croats. The ten stars arranged in a circle, although they resemble those on the European flag, represented the 10 cantons of the Federation.

=== Decision of the constitutional court ===
On 12 April 2004, Sulejman Tihić, then Chairman of the Presidency of Bosnia and Herzegovina, filed a request with the Constitutional Court of Bosnia and Herzegovina for the review of constitutionality of Articles 1 and 2 of the Law on the Coat of Arms and Flag of the Federation of Bosnia and Herzegovina (Official Gazette of Federation of BiH No. 21/96 and 26/96), Articles 1, 2 and 3 of the Constitutional Law on the Flag, Coat of Arms and Anthem of the Republika Srpska (Official Gazette of the Republika Srpska No. 19/92), Articles 2 and 3 of the Law on the Use of Flag, Coat of Arms and Anthem (Official Gazette of the Republika Srpska No. 4/93) and Articles 1 and 2 of the Law on the Family Patron-Saint's Days and Church Holidays of the Republika Srpska (Official Gazette of Republika Srpska No. 19/92). On 2 December 2004 the applicant submitted a supplement to the request. Two partial decisions were made in a year 2006, when the Court found that the coat of arms and flag of the Federation of B&H, and coat of arms, anthem, family patron-saint days and church holidays of Republika Srpska were unconstitutional. In its decision, among other things, the Court stated:

The Constitutional Court concludes that it is the legitimate right of the Bosniak and Croat people in the Federation of BiH and the Serb people in the Republika Srpska to preserve their tradition, culture and identity through legislative mechanisms, but an equal right must be given to the Serb people in the Federation of BiH and Bosniak and Croat peoples in Republika Srpska and other citizens of Bosnia and Herzegovina. The Constitutional Court further holds that it cannot consider as reasonable and justified the fact that any of the constituent peoples has a privileged position in preservation of tradition, culture and identity as all three constituent peoples and other citizens of Bosnia and Herzegovina enjoy the rights and fulfil obligations in the same manner as provided for in the Constitution of Bosnia and Herzegovina and Constitutions of the Entities. Moreover, it is of a particular importance the fact that the identity of the constituent peoples, education, religion, language, fostering culture, tradition and cultural heritage are defined in the Constitution of the Federation of BiH and Constitution of the Republika Srpska, as the vital national interests of the constituent peoples.

The formal name of the item is U-4/04, but it is widely known as "Decision on the insignia of entities" (Bosnian: Odluka o obilježjima entiteta), since its meritum was about the symbols of entities. The Court has ordered the Parliament of the Federation of Bosnia and Herzegovina and the National Assembly of Republika Srpska to bring the contested legal documents in line with the Constitution of Bosnia and Herzegovina within six months from the publishing date of its decision in the Official Gazette of Bosnia and Herzegovina. Since the harmonisation was not done in that granted time-limit, that Court has, on 27 January 2007, adopted the Ruling on failure to enforce in which it established that the contested articles of the interpreted legal documents shall cease to be in force as of the date following the publishing date of the Ruling in Official Gazette of Bosnia and Herzegovina.

On 31 March 2007, the Constitutional Court placed its decision into the "Official Gazette of Bosnia and Herzegovina" officially removing the flag and coat of arms of Federation of Bosnia and Herzegovina.

== See also ==
- Coat of arms of the Federation of Bosnia and Herzegovina
- Flag of Bosnia and Herzegovina
- Flag of Republika Srpska
