= Banja Luka Gymnasium =

- Serbian: Gimnazija Banja Luka, Гимназија Бања Лука
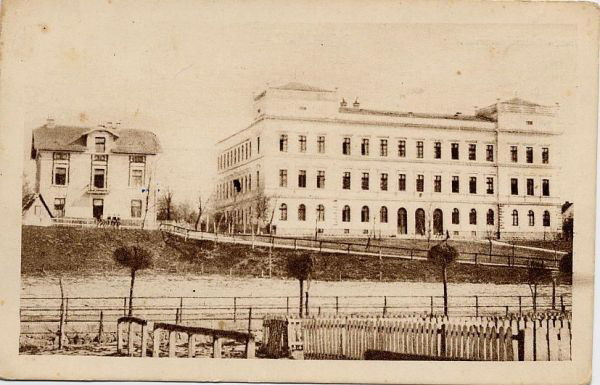
- The school building, pictured in 1903

Location
- Zmaj Jovina 13; Banja Luka; Bosnia and Herzegovina; 44.76970°N 17.18363°E

Information
- Type: Public gymnasium school
- Founded: October 4, 1895; 131 years ago
- Principal: Živka Bačinski
- Teaching staff: 100
- Enrollment: 1,300
- Average class size: 30 students
- Language: Serbian, English
- Colours: Maroon and gray
- Affiliation: International Baccalaureate World School
- Website: www.gimnazijabanjaluka.org

Banja Luka Gymnasium (Serbian: Gimnazija Banja Luka, Гимназија Бања Лука) is a public gymnasium school in Banja Luka, Bosnia and Herzegovina. Situated in the centre of the city, it was founded as the Velika Real, or Grand Royal school on October 4, 1895 by the Austro-Hungarian government, making it the oldest high school in the Republika Srpska entity.

The school, which has approximately 1,100 students and more than 100 staff, offers national and international study programmes. Annual enrollment is about 300 students for the national programmes and 18-22 for the international.

== Education ==
The school teaches the national Matura programme and, as of 2006, the International Baccalaureate (IB) Diploma. Like most high schools in Bosnia and Herzegovina, the Matura programme takes 4 years (ages 15–19). Students choose among 4 different fields of curriculum focus: general, linguistics and social sciences, informatics, and natural sciences.

== Buildings ==
The gymnasium was housed entirely in the original Velika Real building until 1969, when a new building was constructed in Zmaj Jovina Street after a major earthquake.
