= Flag of Republika Srpska =

Flag of the Bosnian entity of Republika Srpska

Republika Srpska
- Тробојка/Trobojka (Tricolor)
- Use: Civil and state flag
- Proportion: 1:2
- Adopted: 12 May 1992
- Design: A horizontal tricolor of red, blue and white

The flag of Republika Srpska within Bosnia and Herzegovina was adopted on 12 May 1992. The flag is a rectangular tricolor with three equal horizontal bands of red, blue and white. It is almost identical to the civil flag of Serbia, but with different aspect ratio of 1:2 instead of 2:3 and slightly different color shades.

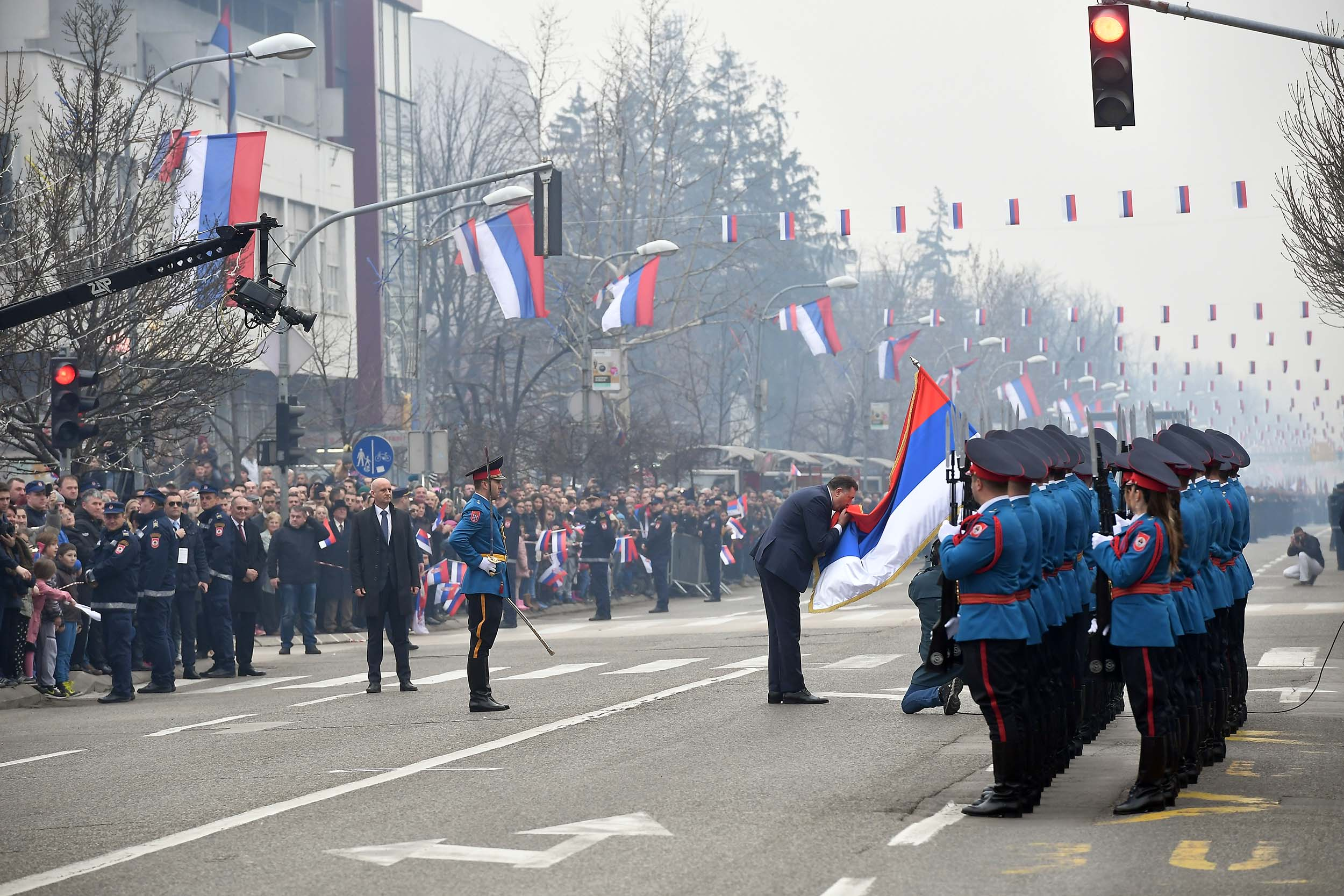
Flags of Republika Srpska during Day of the Republic celebration in Banja Luka

In 2007, the Constitutional Court of Bosnia and Herzegovina declared the flag of the Federation of Bosnia and Herzegovina, the coat of arms of Republika Srpska, and other symbols of Republika Srpska unconstitutional. The court ruled that the symbols did not represent the non-Serb ethnicities living in Republika Srpska. However, the flag of Republika Srpska was deemed to be in line with the constitution. The court ruled that though the combination of the colors relates to the Serbian tricolor, the use of red, blue, and white are considered to be pan-Slavic colors as well.

== Related flags ==
The Serb tricolor has been used as the basis for other flags, most notably as Serbia's national flag. Montenegro has also used the Serbian tricolor with varying shades of blue. Under communist Yugoslavia, the republics of Serbia and Montenegro had flags of same design and colors. Montenegro changed its flag in 1993 by altering the proportion and shade of blue in its flag and used this flag until 2004.

The Serbian tricolor was also the basis for the flag of the Serb minority in Croatia. The Serbian tricolor with a Serbian cross is used as the flag of the Serbian Orthodox Church.

The Republika Srpska's flag is popular among many Bosnian Serbs and they prefer to fly it or the Serbian flag instead of the flag of Bosnia and Herzegovina.

It should also be noted that holding the flag upside down would make the flag resemble the Russian flag, although the Russian flag uses 2:3 aspect ratio.

== Color scheme ==
The specified colours for the flag are as follows:

Republika Srpska	Crimson	Cerulean Blue	White
RGB	237/28/36	57/81/163	255/255/255
Hexadecimal	#ED1C24	#3951A3	#FFFFFF
CMYK	0/88/85/7	65/50/0/36	0/0/0/0

== Gallery ==
Unofficial flag of Republika Srpska, depicting Serbian cross on tricolor (frequently used in 1990s)

Unofficial flag of Republika Srpska charged with emblem

Unofficial flag of Republika Srpska charged with former coat of arms (1995–2007)

=== Standards ===
Standard of the President of Republika Srpska (2007–present)

Standard of the President of Republika Srpska (1995–2007)

Standard used by Prime minister of Republika Srpska (1995–2007)

Former standard of the President of National Assembly of Republika Srpska (1995–2007)

Former standard of Minister of Defence of Republika Srpska (1995–2007)

== See also ==
- Flag of Bosnia and Herzegovina
- Flag of the Federation of Bosnia and Herzegovina
- Flag of the Republic of Serbian Krajina
- Flag of Russia
- Flag of Misiones Province in Argentina
