= Flag of Bosnia and Herzegovina =

Bosnia and Herzegovina
- Use: National flag
- Proportion: 1:2
- Adopted: 4 February 1998; 28 years ago (updated 10 August 2001)
- Design: A medium blue field with a yellow right triangle separating said field; along the hypotenuse of the triangle, there are seven full five-pointed white stars and two half stars at the top and bottom of the flag.
- Designed by: Mladen Kolobarić. The flag was proclaimed by the High Representative Carlos Westendorp.

The national flag of Bosnia and Herzegovina contains a blue field with a yellow right triangle separating said field, and there are seven full five-pointed white stars and two half stars, top and bottom, along the hypotenuse of the triangle.

The three points of the triangle stand for the three main ethnic groups (or "constituent peoples") of Bosnia and Herzegovina: Bosniaks, Croats, and Serbs. The triangle represents the approximate shape of the territory of Bosnia and Herzegovina.

The stars, representing Europe, are meant to be infinite in number, and thus they continue from top to bottom. The flag features colours often associated with neutrality and peace – white, blue, and yellow. They are also colours traditionally associated with Bosnian culture and history. The blue background is evocative of the flag of Europe.

The Bosnian national flag is also often used for official purposes by the Federation of Bosnia and Herzegovina, one of the constituent entities of Bosnia and Herzegovina.

== History ==
=== Bosnian Banate from 1154 until 1377 ===
Used by Stjepan II Kotromanić.

Royal banner of the Banate of Bosnia

=== Bosnian Kingdom from 1377 until 1463 ===
The flag of the Kingdom of Bosnia was based on the coat of arms of the Bosnian dynasty Kotromanić, King Tvrtko I and his successors. The flag of medieval Bosnia was white with the coat of arms of the Kotromanić dynasty in the middle, which consisted of a blue shield with six gold fleur-de-lis displayed around a white bend.

Royal banner of the Kingdom of Bosnia

=== Ottoman Bosnia and Herzegovina from 1463 until 1908 ===
The territory of Ottoman Bosnia and Herzegovina was administered under the Bosnia Eyalet and Herzegovina Eyalet. The green flag with a white crescent and eight-pointed star was used by landlords in Herzegovina who protected the borders with Venice, and by Bosnian troops during the second Siege of Hotin (Bukovina).

Flag of Ottoman Bosnia and Herzegovina (circa 1760)

=== Bosnian Revolt of 1830s flag ===
In the 1831-1832 revolt by Husein Gradaščević, the green flag with a yellow crescent and star was used. The revolt's aim was for Bosnia to gain autonomy from the Ottoman Empire.

Bosnian Revolt Flag, 1831

=== Austro-Hungarian rule ===
When the Austro-Hungarian Empire annexed Bosnia and Herzegovina, the flag was changed. The province of Bosnia used a flag that was a horizontal bicolour of red and yellow, but the province of Herzegovina used the same flag but with reversed colours (yellow and red).

The coat of arms is one of Stjepan Vukčić Kosača, a Bosnian noble and duke from the 14th century. The original medieval coat of arms had a white background and two red stripes at the top of the shield. It was similar to the old flag of Western Bosnia.

Flag of the Condominium of Bosnia and Herzegovina during Austro-Hungarian administration (the country was formally under the sovereignty of the Ottoman Empire) (1878–1908)

Flag of Bosnia during Austro-Hungarian occupation (1878–1908)

Flag of Bosnia after Austro-Hungarian annexation (1908)

Flag of Herzegovina after Austro-Hungarian annexation (1878–1918)

Flag of Bosnia after Austro-Hungarian annexation (1908–1918)

=== Yugoslav period ===
During the interwar period, in the Kingdom of Yugoslavia, Bosnia and Herzegovina had neither a status within it nor a flag to go with it. It was not until after World War II in Yugoslavia and the disestablishment of the monarchy that this changed, as Bosnia and Herzegovina became its own republic within the newly established federal Yugoslavia. During that period, the flag of the Axis puppet state of the Independent State of Croatia was flown across the territories of modern-day Bosnia and Herzegovina.

Flag of the Independent State of Croatia (1941–1945)

Flag of Nazi Germany used in the northern occupied zone (1941–1943) and the rest of the NDH territory (1943–1945)

Flag of Fascist Italy used in the southern occupied zone (1941–1943)

Without constitutional recognition, the mid-war Federal State of Bosnia and Herzegovina first adopted the flag flown by Bosnian-Herzegovinian Partisans during the war—a wholly red flag with a narrowly gold-bordered red star in its centre, both symbolizing socialism and communism. The flag was usually accompanied on official buildings by the flag of federal Yugoslavia and the flag of the League of Communists of Yugoslavia. A smaller version of the flag served as the civil ensign, while an elongated banner version was seen flown in front of the Yugoslav parliament.

The flag of the Bosnian—Herzegovinian Partisans during World War II (27 November 1943)

The Flag of the Democratic Federal Yugoslavia during World War II (1943–1946)

The Flag of the Yugoslav Partisans during World War II (16 December 1942)

Wide public discussion ahead of constitutional adoption resulted in the overall opinion that the state flag should be red, like the one initially flown by liberation movements, and not in national pan-Slavic tricolours of Serbs and Croats, which were argued to have been an "import" from a later stage of the war. This discussion was in response to the first proposed flag from 15 November 1946, which matched the federal flag except for an additional golden star placed behind the existing gold-bordered red star in the centre, with their rays positioned interchangeably. Belgrade officials listened to the public opinion but proceeded to add the federal Yugoslav tricolour to the canton of a plain red flag to symbolise the republic's affiliation to the Federation, and as such, it was officially adopted on 31 December 1946. In real-world usage, this flag had a variant with a much larger canton, which was offset from the edges and bordered in white. This variant was eventually proposed sometime in 1947 but was never adopted.

Bosnia and Herzegovina also had a new coat of arms during Yugoslav rule; it was a symbol of Bosnian industrialism at the time. A red flag with central elements of this coat of arms in the canton was erroneously reported in one contemporary book to have been the flag of Bosnia and Herzegovina.

Proposed flag of the People's Republic of Bosnia and Herzegovina (15 November 1946)

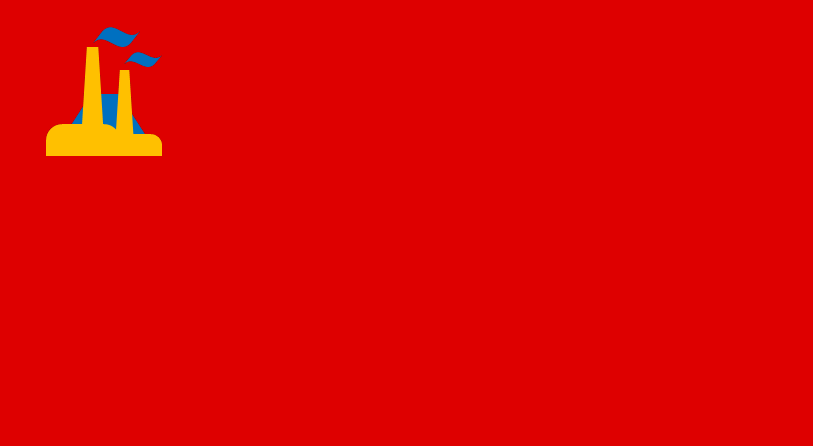
The flag that was in an error reported as the new flag of Bosnia and Herzegovina in one contemporary book

Proposed flag of the People's Republic of Bosnia and Herzegovina (1947)

Flag of the SR of Bosnia and Herzegovina (31 December 1946 − 6 April 1992)

=== Republic of Bosnia and Herzegovina (1992–1998) ===
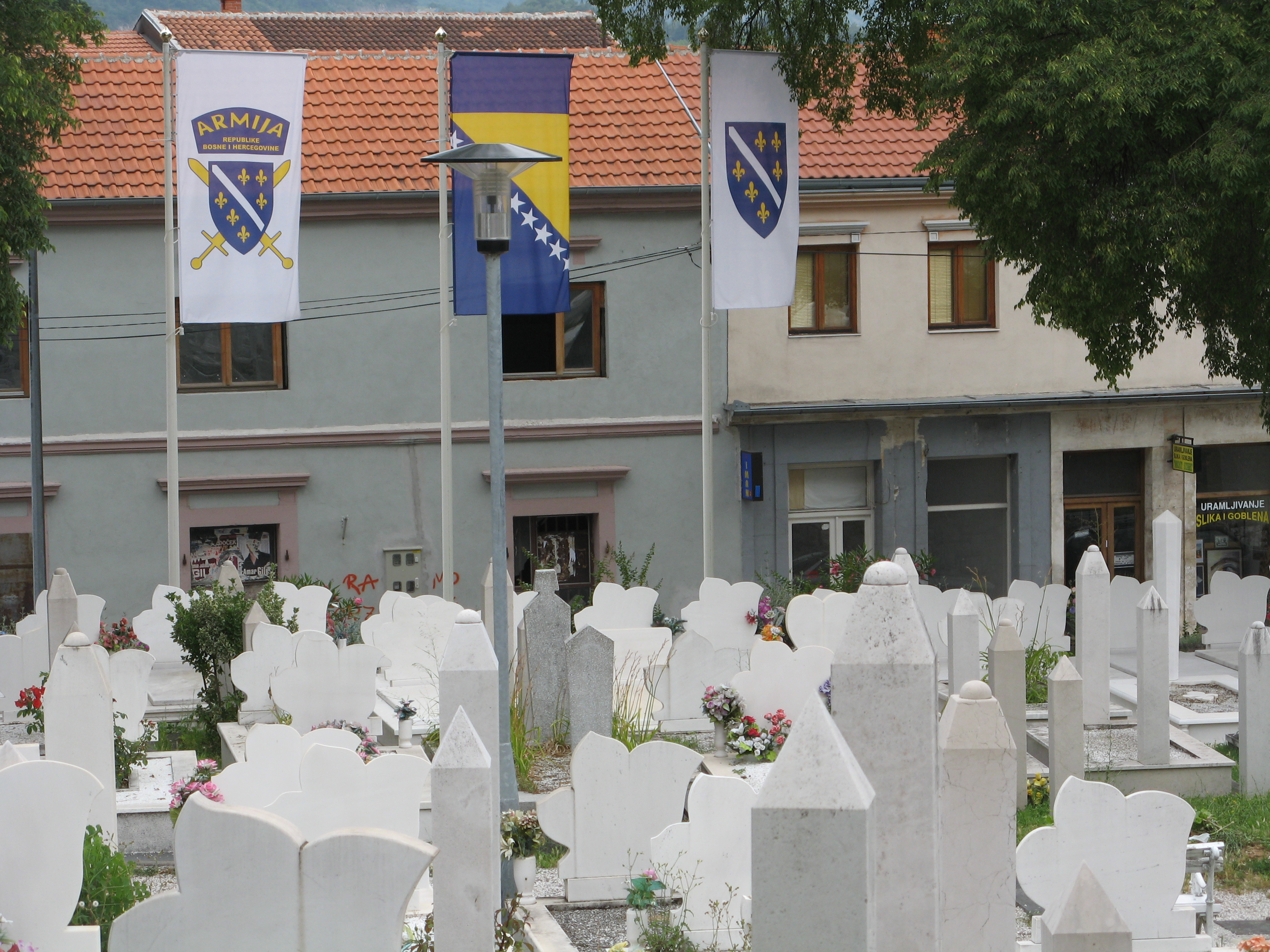
A cemetery in Mostar flying the flag of the Army of the Republic of Bosnia and Herzegovina (left), the flag of Bosnia and Herzegovina, and the flag of the Republic of Bosnia and Herzegovina

On 3 March 1992, Bosnia and Herzegovina declared its independence from Yugoslavia. Initially, the newly independent Republic of Bosnia and Herzegovina continued to use the flag of the Socialist Republic of Bosnia and Herzegovina until a new flag was adopted on 20 May 1992. The flag picked was the arms of the kings of the Bosnian Kotromanić dynasty, who ruled from 1377 until 1463 over the area that is present-day Bosnia and Herzegovina and Dalmatia. It consisted of a blue shield with six golden lilies displayed around a white bend; the golden lily is the Lilium bosniacum, which is a native lily to the area. The flag chosen in 1992 has a white background with the Bosnian lily in the centre. It was and still is the main Bosniak national flag. Though it is no longer an official flag of the state, the flag continues to be used unofficially by Bosniak civilians as their ethnic flag, at football games, political rallies, and other such events.

Flag of the Republic of Bosnia and Herzegovina (3 March 1992 − 20 May 1992)

Flag of the Republic of Bosnia and Herzegovina (20 May 1992 − 3 February 1998), still widely used unofficially among many Bosnians.

Flag of Republika Srpska (1992-1995)

Flag of the Croatian Republic of Herzeg-Bosnia

=== Bosnia and Herzegovina after the Dayton Accords ===
The Bosnian Serbs, before and after the signing of the Dayton Agreement, viewed the flag with the six fleurs-de-lis as only representing the Bosniaks (i.e., Bosnian Muslims) of Bosnia and Herzegovina. The flag of the state was eventually changed into the current, post-1998 flag. The current flag was introduced by the UN High Representative Carlos Westendorp after the Parliament of Bosnia and Herzegovina could not decide on a solution that was acceptable to all parties. Aside from the colors, the current flag contains no historical or other references to the Bosnian state. The flag is rarely ever seen in Republika Srpska, whose residents prefer to fly either that entity's regional flag or the Serbian national flag instead. Some Bosniaks dislike or have no particular affinity for the flag, preferring the former Bosnian national flag used from 1992 to 1998, or the former socialist-era Yugoslav flag instead.

Flag of Bosnia and Herzegovina (4 February 1998 − present)

Construction sheet

== Colour scheme ==
Colors	Pantone	CMYK	RGB	Hexadecimal
Blue	Reflex Blue C	100, 87, 0, 20	0, 20, 137	#001489
Yellow	116 C	0, 10, 98, 0	255, 205, 0	#FFCD00
White	None	0, 0, 0, 0	255, 255, 255	#FFFFFF

== Alternative flag proposals ==
The first flag that was proposed in the First Set of Proposals was the "Czech Pattern", similar to the flag of the Czech Republic. It was intended to represent all three constitutive nations living in Bosnia and Herzegovina. The next proposal was the "Laurel branch". It is based on the light blue colour of the United Nations flag. It would have had a golden olive branch in the middle. The olive branch is taken from the United Nations emblem. The flag would have only one branch. The branch was rotated around 30 degrees anticlockwise. The third proposal was the "Map" proposal. It would also use the United Nations' light blue colour; however, there would be the addition of a white outline map of Bosnia and Herzegovina. No official text was ever published specifying the colour of the outline, but it probably would have been white.

First alternative flag of first proposal

Second alternative flag of first proposal

Third alternative flag of first proposal

The second set of proposals were all red, white, and blue tricolours. The first flag design was a diagonally striped (different colours but in the same pattern as the flag of the Republic of the Congo). In the centre there would be a blue map of Bosnia and Herzegovina outlined in yellow in the middle inside a circle of 10 five-pointed yellow stars. The flag would have been a 1:2 ratio. The second flag proposed was very similar except it had 12 five-pointed stars to represent the European Union. The flag of Europe has the 12 five-pointed stars. The third design was a bit more different from the first two designs. The diagonal tricolour shape was kept, but the diagonal white stripe was made wider so that the angle was not perfectly 45 degrees. In the centre there was a yellow map of Bosnia and Herzegovina outlined in green, and under it there were two green olive branches. The olive branch pattern was the same one that the United Nations uses in its flag. The fourth and final design kept the same emblem from the third design but did not have the diagonal stripes. Instead, it had a horizontal tricolour pattern of blue, white, and red (from top to bottom), similar to that of the former Yugoslavia.

First alternative flag of second proposal

Second alternative flag of second proposal

Third alternative flag of second proposal

Fourth alternative flag of second proposal

The first Westendorp alternative flag was a highly similar one to today's flag, a diagonally divided top-hoist to bottom-fly yellow-over-light-blue flag with a line of 9 white five-pointed stars in the light blue field along the diagonal. The only major difference was that the colour of the background was UN blue. The second Carlos Westendorp alternative flag is a light blue flag (using the United Nations' flag's colours) with 5 bars interchangeably coming out of the hoist and not reaching the other end. The colours are interchangeably yellow and white. In the third alternative flag, the field was light blue and had five narrow yellow bars.

First Carlos Westendorp alternative flag proposal

Second Carlos Westendorp alternative flag proposal

Third Carlos Westendorp alternative flag proposal

Westendorp's decision ended up being the first alternative flag. However, it was changed slightly to a darker blue, evocative of the European Union's flag.

== Flags of administrative divisions ==
=== Entities of Bosnia and Herzegovina ===
Flag of the Federation of Bosnia and Herzegovina (5 November 1996 – 14 June 2007)

Flag of Republika Srpska (6 April 1992 – present)

== See also ==
- List of Bosnian and Herzegovinian flags
- Coat of arms of Bosnia and Herzegovina
- Flag of the Federation of Bosnia and Herzegovina
- Flag of Republika Srpska
- Federation of Bosnia and Herzegovina
- Flag of Kosovo
- Flag of Tokelau – a flag with a similar appearance
- Esquire (heraldry)
