= Flag of Dalmatia =

Flag of a historical kingdom

Dalmatia
- Use: Other
- Proportion: 2:3
Adopted
1822 (original flag)
1918 (current flag)
- Design: Two equal horizontal bands of light blue and yellow.

The flag of Dalmatia consisted of two identical horizontal stripes of light blue and yellow. Like the Croatian flag, it draws its modern roots from the period of the Austrian Empire, specifically from the Kingdom of Dalmatia. The coat of arms of Dalmatia—blue with three golden crowned leopard (lion guardant) heads—is never used on it, it is a simple yellow over blue bicolour without any emblem, as was custom of Austrian "landesfarben". The coat of arms was possibly sometimes set in it, but this was far from official.

The bi-colour flag of Dalmatia was designed in 1802 and made for the first time in 1803. The flag has been in official use of the Kingdom of Dalmatia since 1822, when it was accepted by the Royal Council in Zadar. After 1918, there was no administrative region of Dalmatia, and no flag was used. The Dalmatian counties of modern-day Croatia inherit blue and yellow colours, but no one has the right to "claim" the entire historical Dalmatian coat of arms. The coat of arms is, on the other hand, included in the Croatian coat of arms and the flag.

However, the banners of arms of Dalmatia were sometimes used, mostly as souvenirs, and occasionally Italian groups with pretensions on Dalmatia, or those who left Dalmatia after World War II, used such flags in the last 50 years, always unofficially. An alternate version of the flag, featuring bleu celeste instead of azure, is almost indistinguishable from the modern flag of Ukraine, though there is no connection between the two.

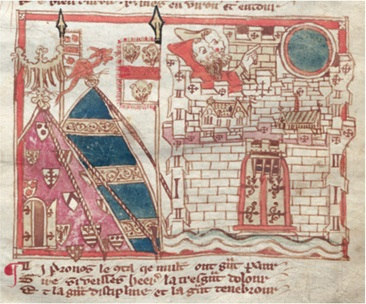
La Destructioun de Rome, "Le Roy de Esclevoni"

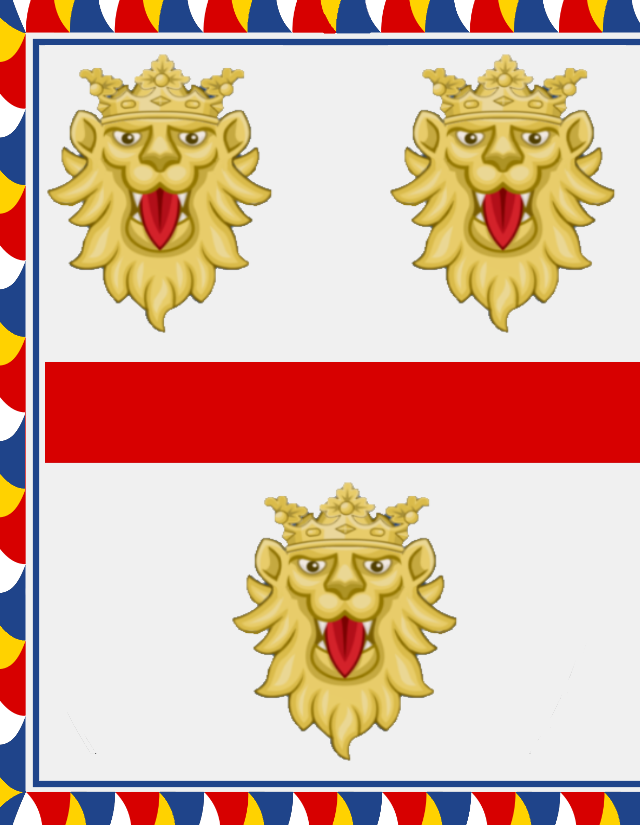
"Le Roy de Esclevoni", 1295.

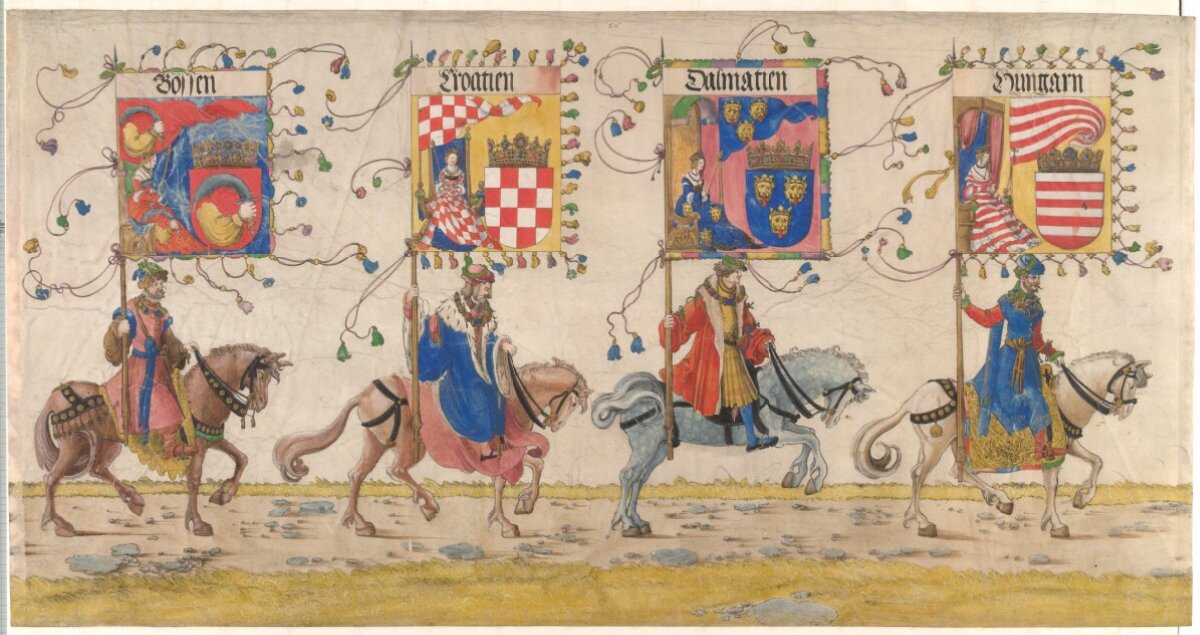
The flags of Hungary, Dalmatia, Croatia and Bosnia, Triumphal Procession of Emperor Maximilian I, 1512.

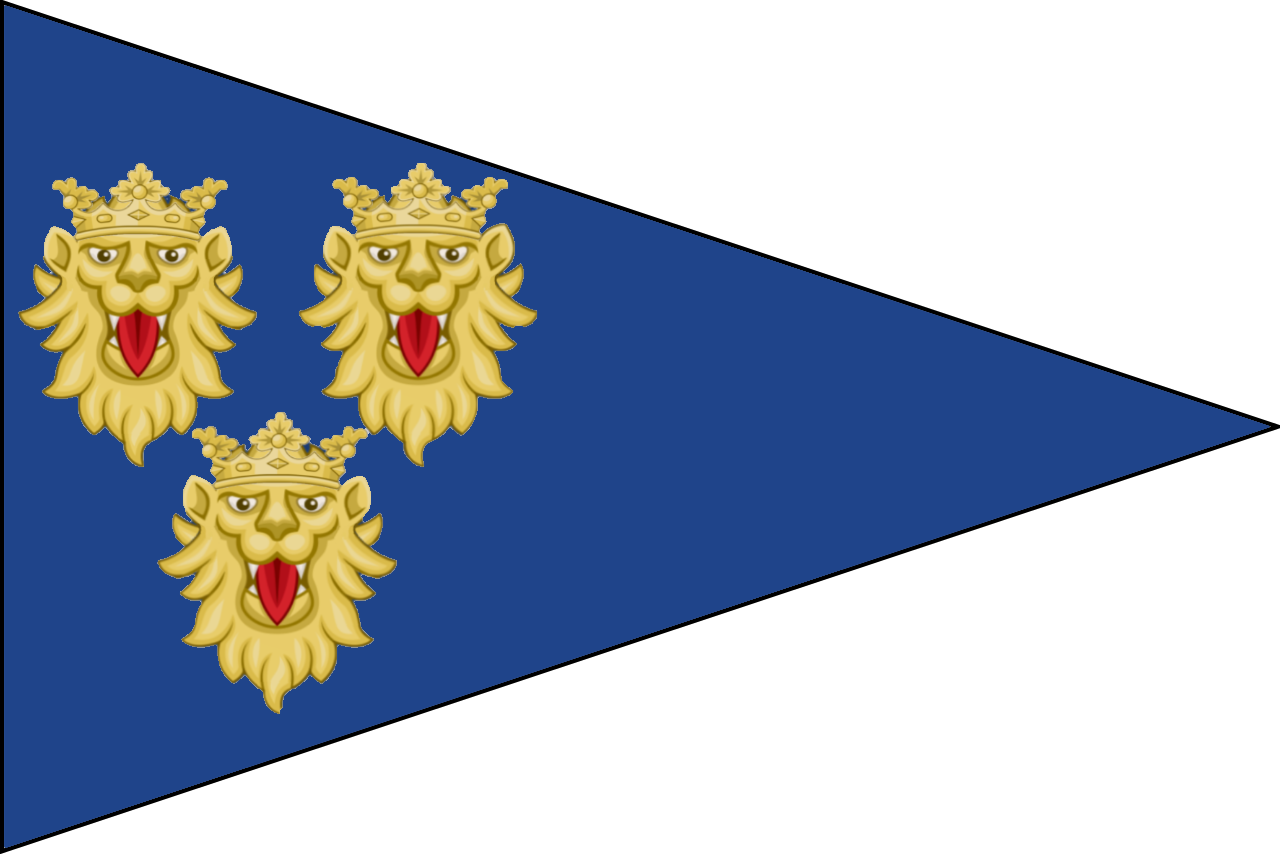
Flag of Dalmatia, 1512.

== See also ==
- Coat of arms of Dalmatia
- Dalmatia
- History of Dalmatia
- Kingdom of Dalmatia
- Flag of Croatia
- Flags of Croatia
