= Leopard (heraldry) =

Heraldic animal

Leopards in the arms of the Hohenlohe princes

The leopard in heraldry is traditionally depicted the same as a lion, but in a walking position with its head turned to full face, thus it is also known as a lion passant guardant in some texts, though leopards more naturally depicted make some appearances in modern heraldry. The Oxford Guide to Heraldry makes little mention of leopards but glosses leopard as a "term used in medieval heraldry for lion passant guardant. Now used for the natural beast." Another name for this beast is the ounce.

== Early heraldic leopards ==
The typical heraldic leopard differs from the natural leopard (Panthera pardus) in that it has no spots and often has a mane, but is generally similar in appearance to a heraldic lion, other than its attitude. In the Middle Ages, leopards were thought to be a crossbreed between a lion and a pard.

Arthur Charles Fox-Davies wrote in 1909 that the distinction between lions (which were constantly rampant) and leopards (which were necessarily walking) originated in French heraldry and was brought into English heraldry along with so much else of English language and custom deriving from French traditions. But "the use of the term leopard in heraldry to signify a certain position for the lion never received any extensive sanction, and has long since become obsolete in British armory," though the distinction is still observed in French blazon.

Fox-Davies further notes that the lions depicted in the royal arms of England, though passant guardant, have never represented anything other than lions, also pointing out that another ancient (if controversial) rule distinguishing leopards from lions dictated that while several leopards could appear on one shield, there could not be more than one lion on the shield (with the apparent exception of two lions combatant); multiple rampant lions on one shield were called lioncels.

== Countries with leopards in their coats of arms ==
=== One leopard ===
- Coat of arms of Fiji
- Coat of arms of Ghana

=== Two leopards ===
- Coat of arms of the principality of Hohenlohe
- Coat of arms of Normandy

=== Three leopards ===
- Coat of arms of Canada
- Coat of arms of Denmark (12th century - 1819. After that changed to lions.)
- Coat of arms of Estonia
- Coat of arms of England
- Coat of arms of Jersey
- Coat of arms of Guernsey
- Coat of arms of Croatia

=== Leopard's heads ===
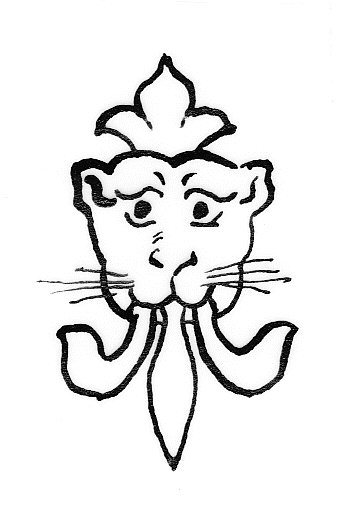
A leopard's face jessant-de-lys

- Coat of arms of Dalmatia, until 1526 the official arms of Croatia and was later used by Kingdom of Dalmatia in Habsburg monarchy; it is now part of Coat of arms of Croatia.
- A leopard's face is frequently shown Jessant-de-lys, as in the 13th century arms of Cantilupe displayed by Thomas de Cantilupe and his nephew William de Cantilupe.

=== Natural leopards ===
- Coat of arms of Aberdeen
- Coat of arms of Benin
- Arms of the Democratic Republic of the Congo (formerly Zaire)
- Coat of arms of Gabon (black panther)
- Coat of arms of Malawi
- Coat of arms of Somalia

== See also ==
- Lion (heraldry)
