= Miroslav Šutej =

Croatian artist (1936–2005)

- Born: 29 April 1936; Duga Resa, Kingdom of Yugoslavia (modern Croatia)
- Died: 13 May 2005 (aged 69); Krapinske Toplice, Croatia
- Education: Zagreb Academy of Fine Arts
- Known for: Painting, printmaking
- Notable work: Coat of arms of Croatia; Croatian kuna banknotes
- Movement: Op art

Miroslav Šutej (29 April 1936 – 13 May 2005) was a Croatian avant-garde painter and graphic artist. Šutej was the designer of the modern Croatian flag as well as the banknotes for the Croatian kuna, the Croatian coat of arms, and the jersey pattern of Croatia's national football team and football club Dinamo Zagreb.

== Biography ==
Šutej was born in Duga Resa in 1936. He studied painting at the Academy of Fine Arts Zagreb and was an associate in Krsto Hegedušić's master's workshop. Since 1970, Šutej was a professor at the Academy.

Šutej became a full member of the Croatian Academy of Sciences and Arts in 1997.

Šutej was the designer of the modern Croatian flag as well as the banknotes for the Croatian kuna, the Croatian coat of arms, and the jersey pattern of Croatia's national football team and Dinamo Zagreb.
