= Flag of Croatia =

Republic of Croatia
- Trobojnica (Tricolor)
- Use: National flag
- Proportion: 1:2
- Adopted: 21 December 1990; 35 years ago
- Design: A horizontal tricolor of red, white, and blue anchored by the national coat of arms.
- Designed by: Miroslav Šutej
- Use: Civil and state ensign
- Proportion: 2:3
- Adopted: 1992
- Design: Three equal horizontal bands of red (top), white and blue superimposed by the Coat of arms of Croatia.
- Use: Naval ensign
- Proportion: 2:3
- Adopted: 1992
- Design: Three equal horizontal bands of red (top), white and blue superimposed by the emblem of the Croatian Navy.

The national flag of the Republic of Croatia, also known in Croatian as the Tricolor (Trobojnica) or the Red-white-blue (Crven-bijeli-plavi), is one of the state symbols of Croatia. It consists of three equal size, horizontal stripes in colors red, white and blue anchored by the coat of arms of Croatia.

This flag has been continuously in use since 1868 using pan-Slavic colors with the white and red checkboard shield added from 1939; which was then replaced by a red star during communist rule before the modern iteration of the Croat flag was adopted in 1990, one year before its independence.

== History ==
The flag combines the colors of the flags of the Kingdom of Croatia (red and white), the Kingdom of Slavonia (blue and white) and partially of the Kingdom of Dalmatia (blue and yellow).

The red-white-blue tricolor has been used as the Croatian flag since 1848, and the pan-Slavic colors are widely associated with romantic nationalism. While the Banovina of Croatia existed within the Kingdom of Yugoslavia, it had a similar flag without the modern crown above the Croatian checkerboard. After the Kingdom of Yugoslavia was invaded and Croatia became the Independent State of Croatia, the crown was removed and a "U" was placed at the top left of the flag. Also, the first field of the Croatian checkerboard was white. After Nazi Germany was superseded by the SFR Yugoslavia, Croatia's flag had a five-pointed red star with a yellow border in place of the coat of arms. The star was replaced by the coat of arms in May 1990, shortly after the first multiparty elections. The current flag and the coat of arms were officially adopted on 21 December 1990, about six (de facto) or ten (de jure) months before the proclamation of independence from Yugoslavia and a day before the Constitution of Croatia on 22 December 1990.

== Shield ==
The shield depicts the red and white Croatian checkerboard. Above the shield is a crown consisting of shields of its various regions. From dexter to sinister (bearer's right to left; viewer's left to right) they are the historical arms of Croatia: Central Croatia, Dubrovnik, Dalmatia, Istria and Slavonia.

== Design ==
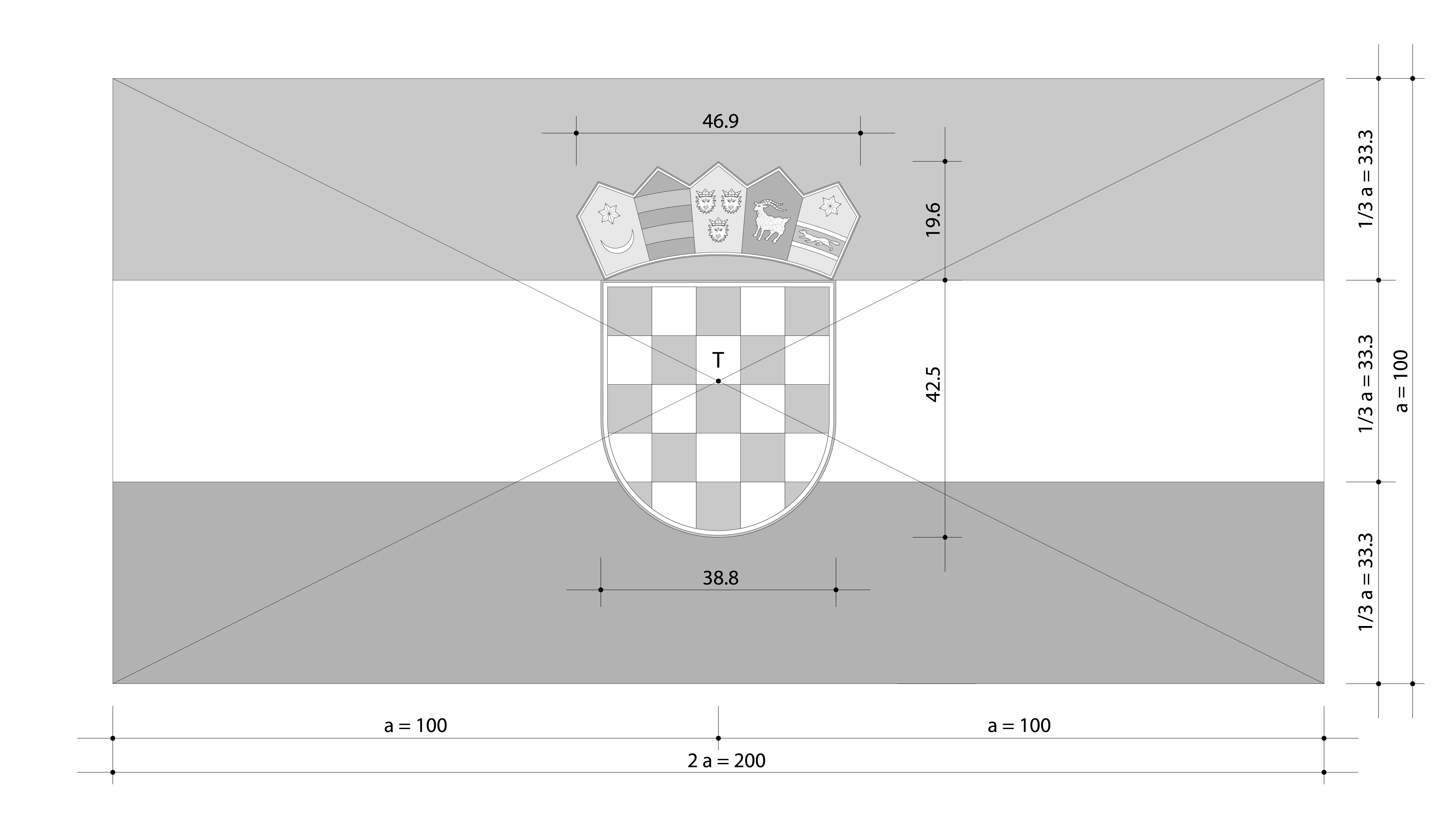
Flag construction sheet

The following colors are specified for use in the flag:

Scheme	Red	White	Cyan	Blue	Yellow	Black
Pantone	485 C	Transparent white	Process Cyan C	Blue 072 C	108 C	Process Black C
CMYK	0.100.100.0	0.0.0.0	100.0.0.0	100.90.20.7	0.6.95.0	0.0.0.100
RGB	(255,0,15)	(255,255,255)	(0,147,221)	(0,0,145)	(247,219,23)	(0,0,0)
Hex	#E1000F	#FFFFFF	#0093DD	#000091	#F7DB17	#000000

== Unicode ==
The national flag of Croatia is represented as the Unicode emoji sequence U+1F1ED 🇭 REGIONAL INDICATOR SYMBOL LETTER H and U+1F1F7 🇷 REGIONAL INDICATOR SYMBOL LETTER R.

== Historical flags ==
Flag of the Kingdom of Croatia (1852–1860)

Flag of the Kingdom of Slavonia (1852–1860)

Flag of the Kingdom of Dalmatia (1852–1860)

Civil Flag of the Kingdom of Croatia-Slavonia (1868–1918)

Flag of the Kingdom of Croatia-Slavonia with the coat of arms of the Triune Kingdom, used only in autonomous affairs. (1868–1918)

Flag of the State of Slovenes, Croats and Serbs (29 October – 1 December 1918)

Flag of the Banovina of Croatia (1939–1941)

Flag of the Independent State of Croatia (1941–1945)

Flag of the People's Republic of Croatia (26 May 1945 – 18 January 1947)

Flag of the Socialist Republic of Croatia (18 January 1947 – 25 July 1990)

Flag of the Republic of Croatia (25 July – 21 December 1990)

Variation of the flag of the Republic of Croatia (25 July – 21 December 1990)

Flag of the Republic of Croatia (21 December 1990 – present)

== Other official flags in Croatia ==
Standard of the president of the Republic of Croatia

=== Naval and other official flags ===
Naval Ensign

Naval Jack

Flag of the President as the Commander-in-Chief

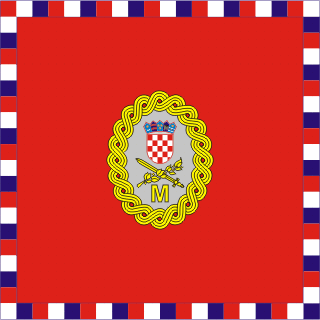
Flag of the Minister of Defense

Flag of the Chief of the General Staff

Flag of the Commander of the Croatian Navy

Flag of the Admiral of the Fleet

Flag of the Admiral

Flag of the Vice Admiral

Flag of the Rear Admiral

Flag of the Commodore

Pennant of the commander of a fleet of naval vessels

Pennant of the commander of a flotilla of naval vessels

Pennant of the commander of a division of naval vessels

Pennant of the commander of a group of naval vessels

Pennant of the most senior commander of a naval vessel

Pennant of the commander of a naval vessel

Flag of the Speaker of the Croatian Parliament

Flag of the President of the Government of the Republic of Croatia

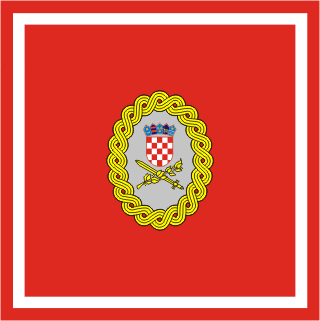
Flag of the General of the Armed Forces

== Commemoration ==
- Hrvatska pošta released into circulation two commemorative postage stamps featuring the motifs of the installation flag of Ban Josip Jelačić from 1848 and the contemporary Croatian flag on Croatian flag day (5 June).

== Gallery ==
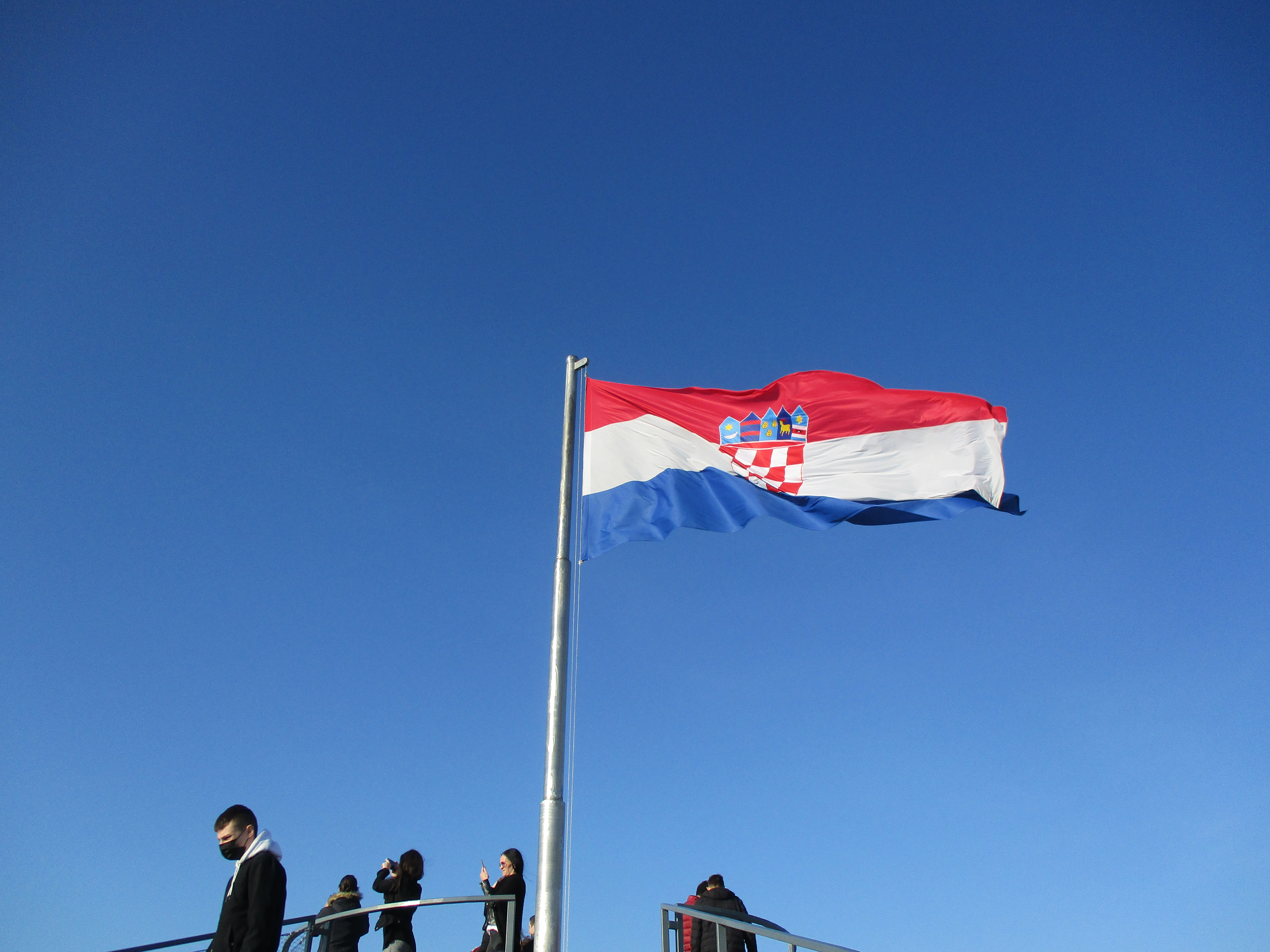
Flag of Croatia on the top of the Vukovar water tower.

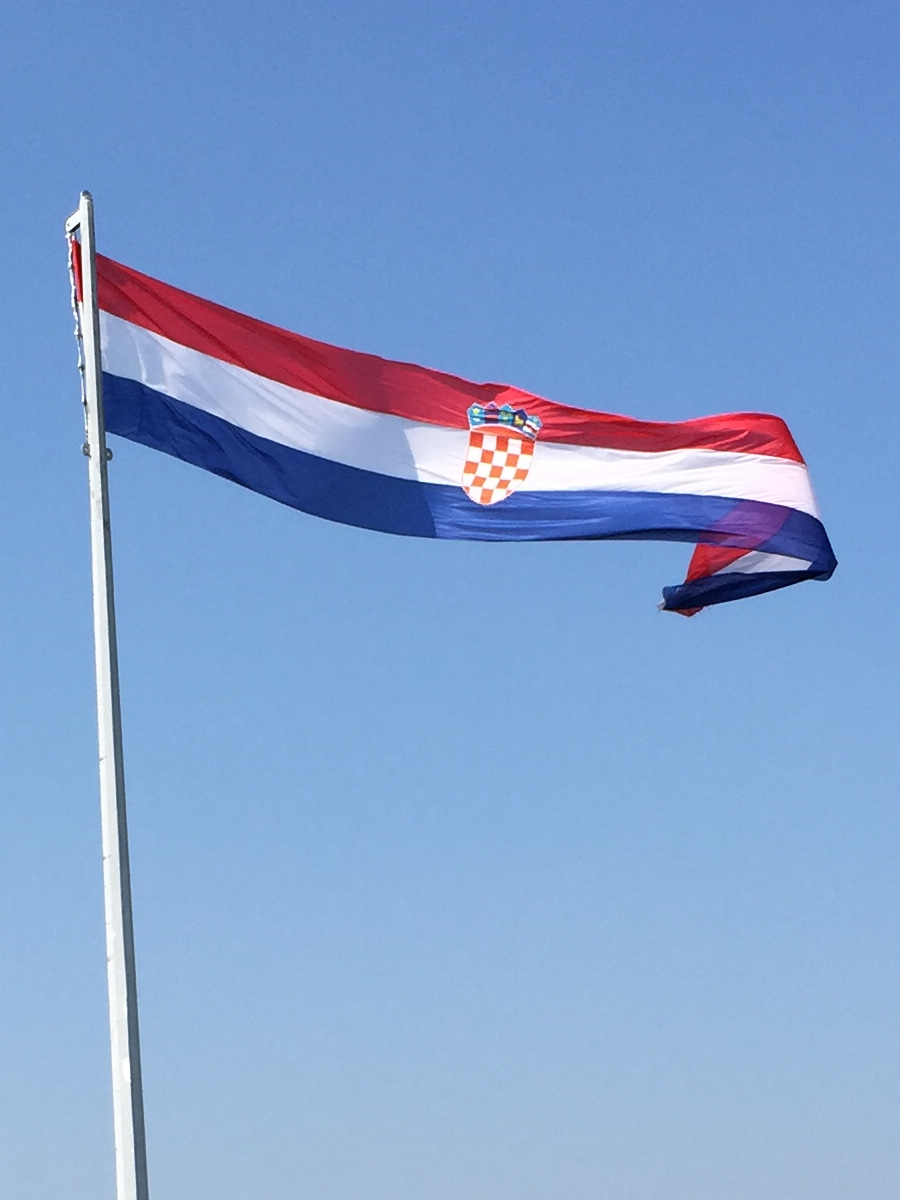
Flag of Croatia on Knin Fortress.

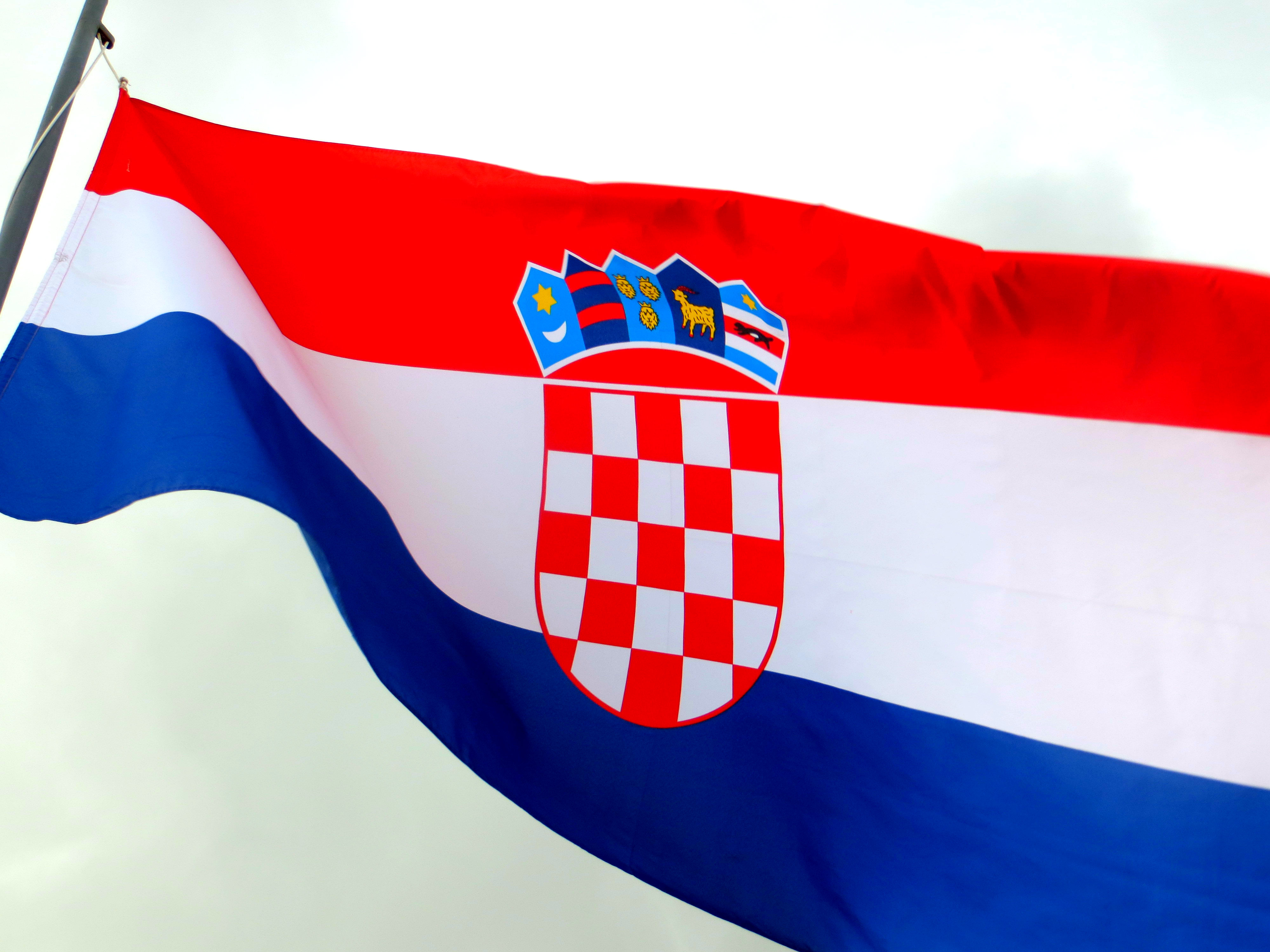
Croatian flag flying in Dubrovnik.

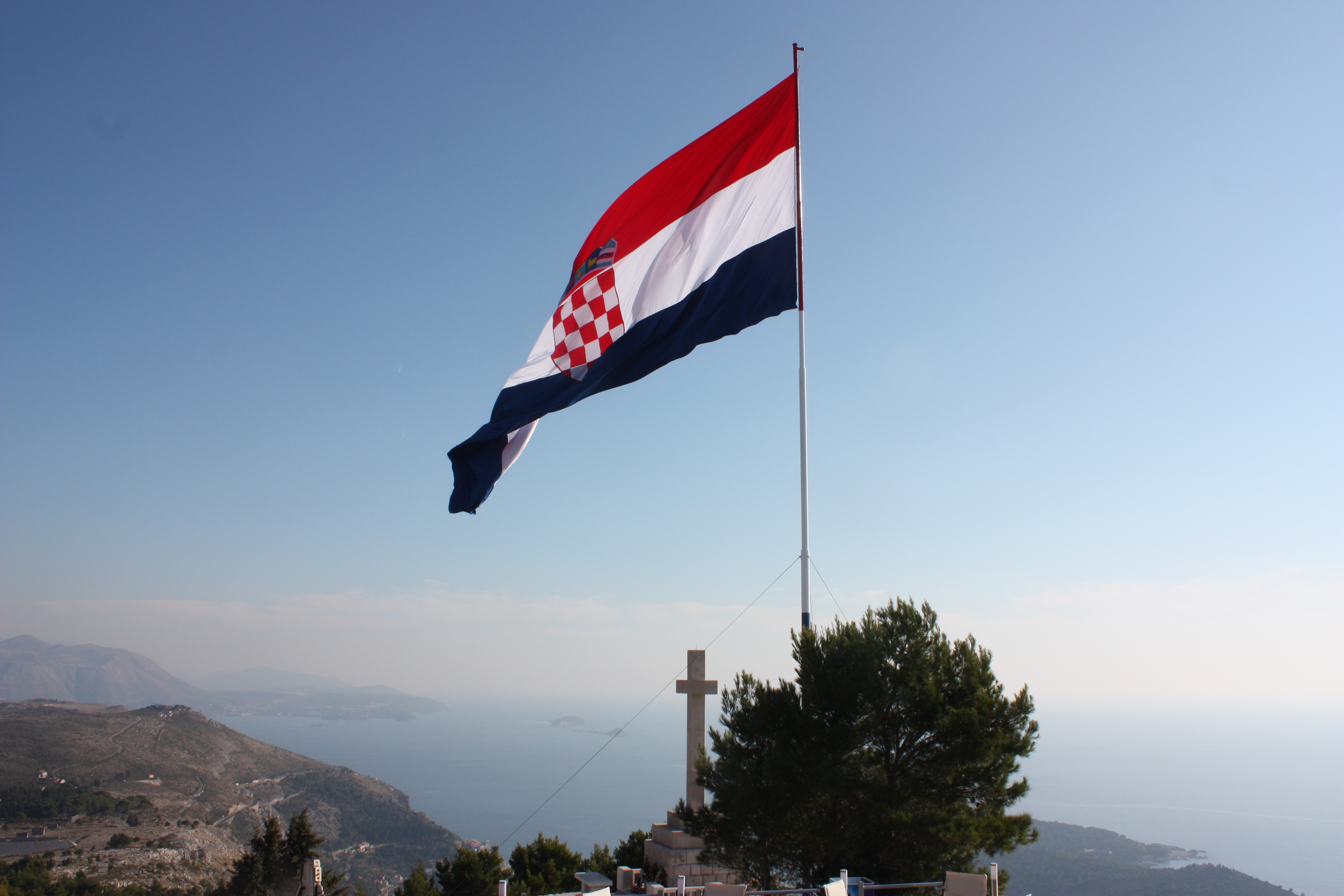
The largest flying flag in Croatia, atop the Srđ mountain over the Dubrovnik.

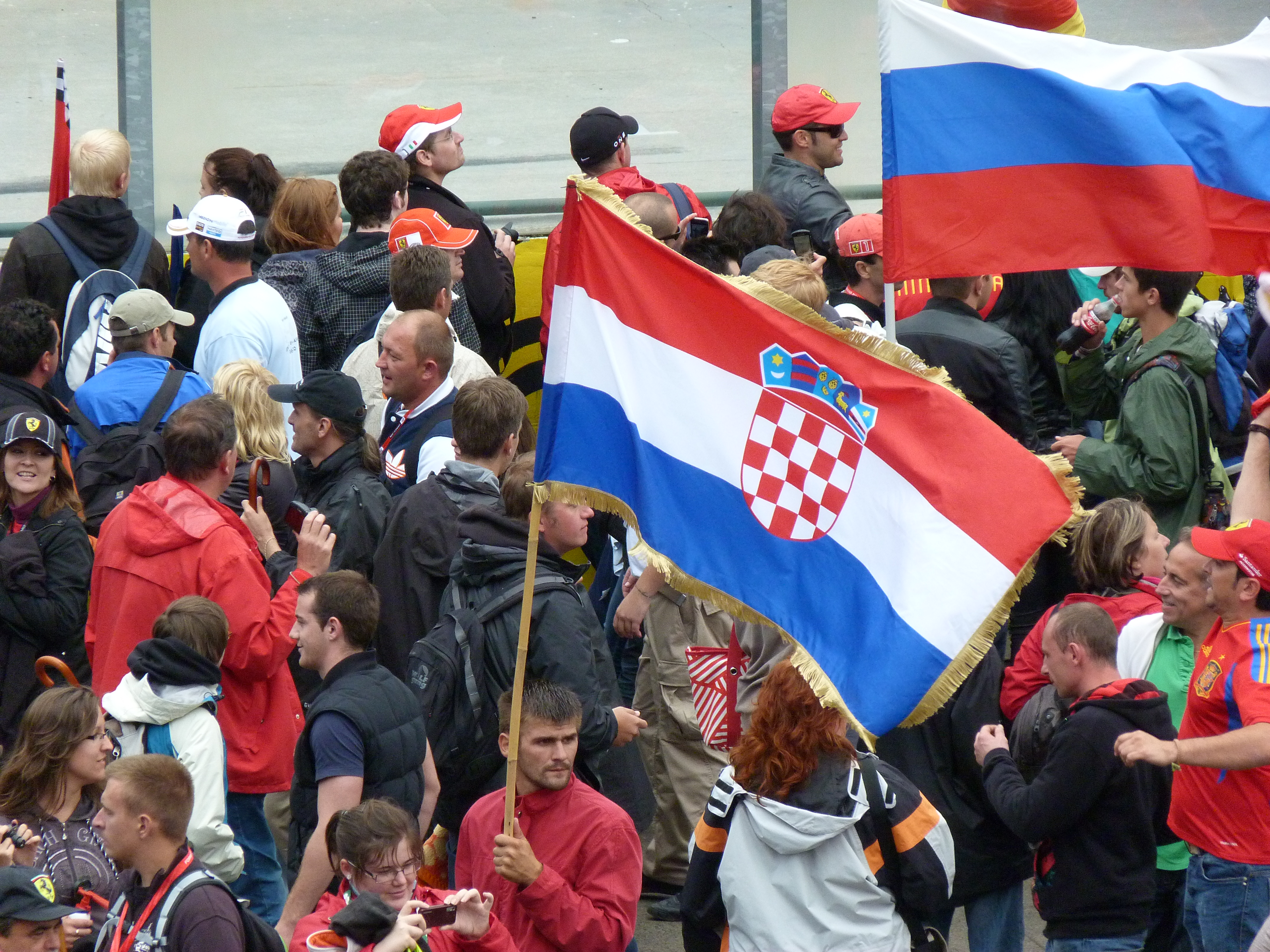
Fans holding the Croatian flag during the 2011 Hungarian Grand Prix.

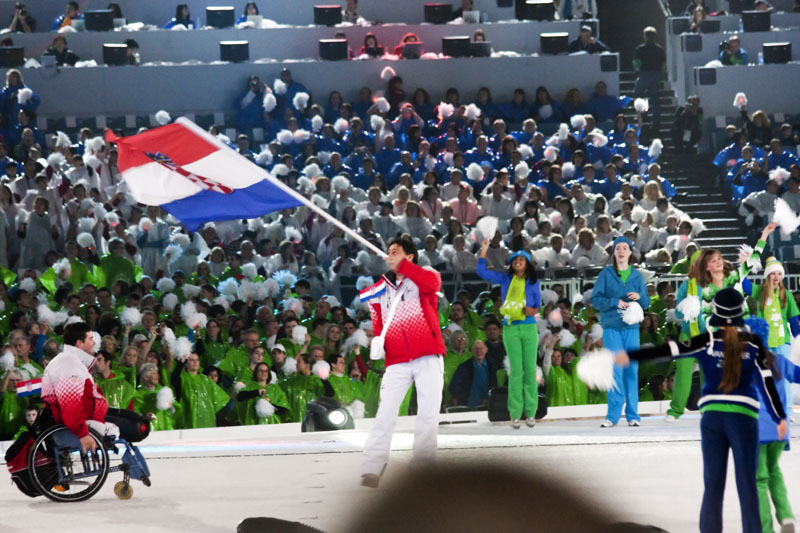
Athletes of Croatia entering during the opening ceremonies of the 2010 Winter Paralympics with the national flag.

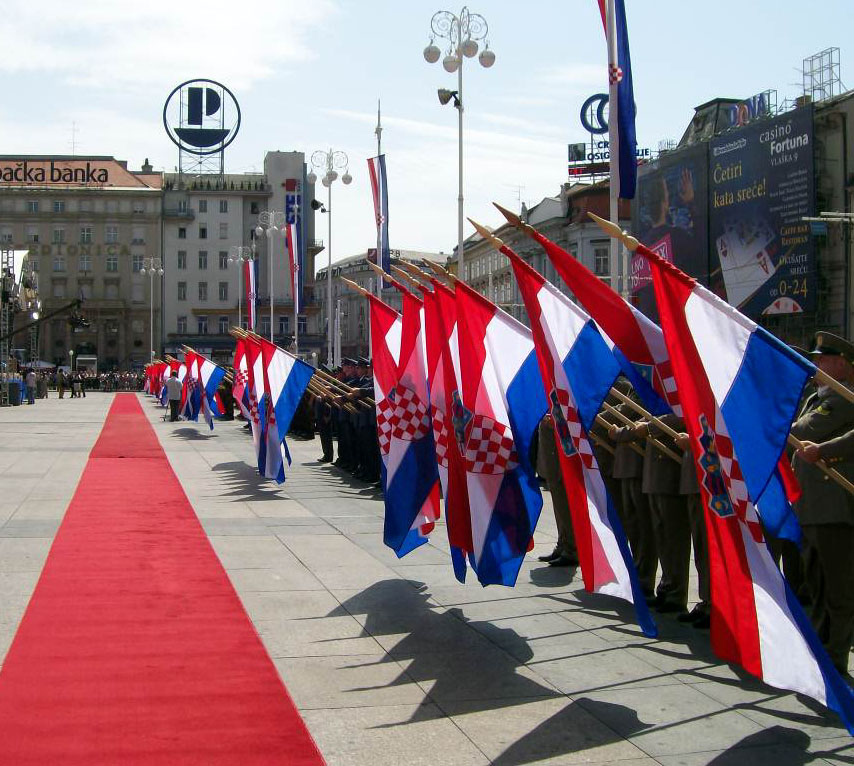
A series of Croatian flags during Statehood Day in 2007.

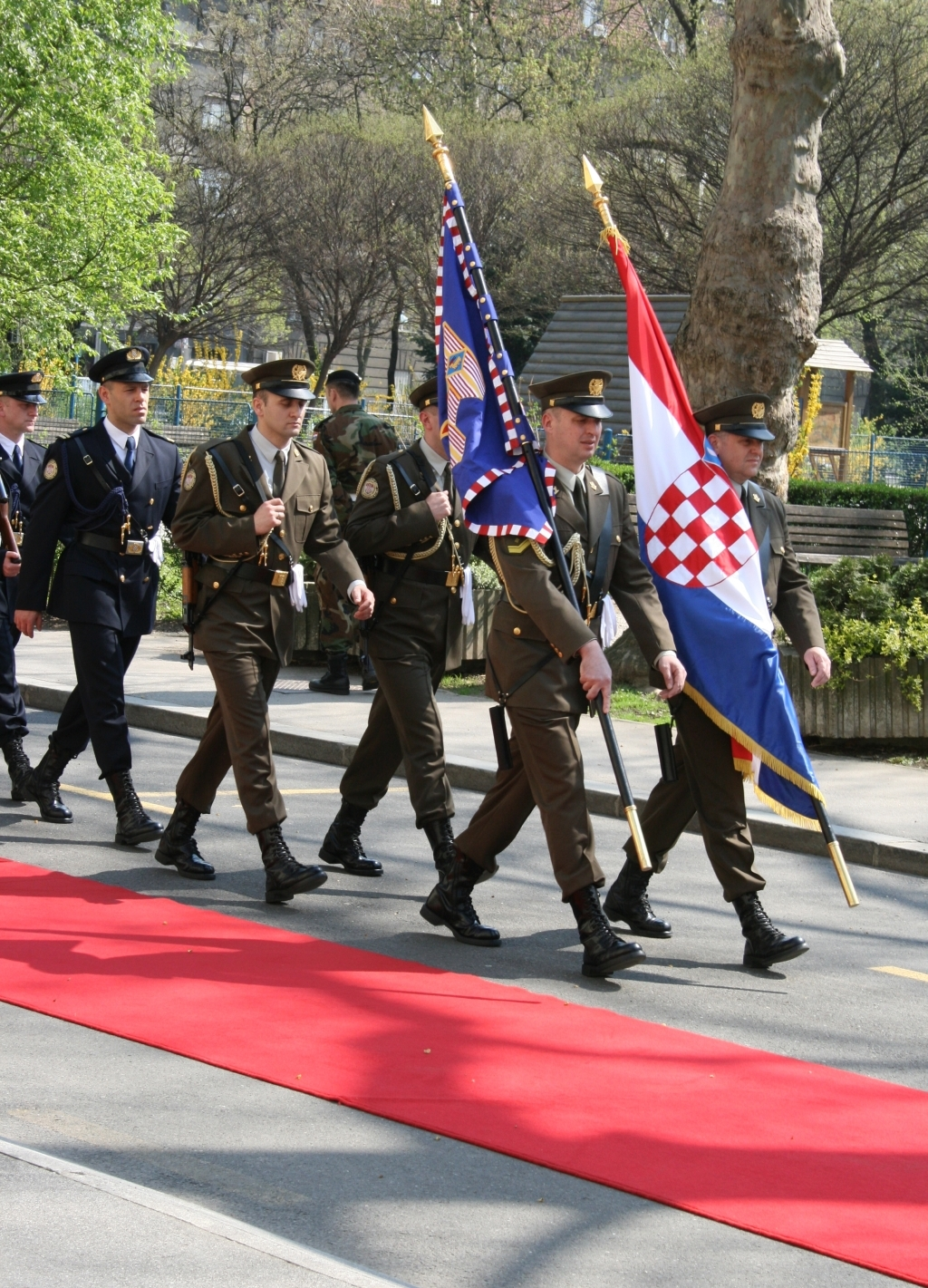
Croatian Honor Guard during the parade.

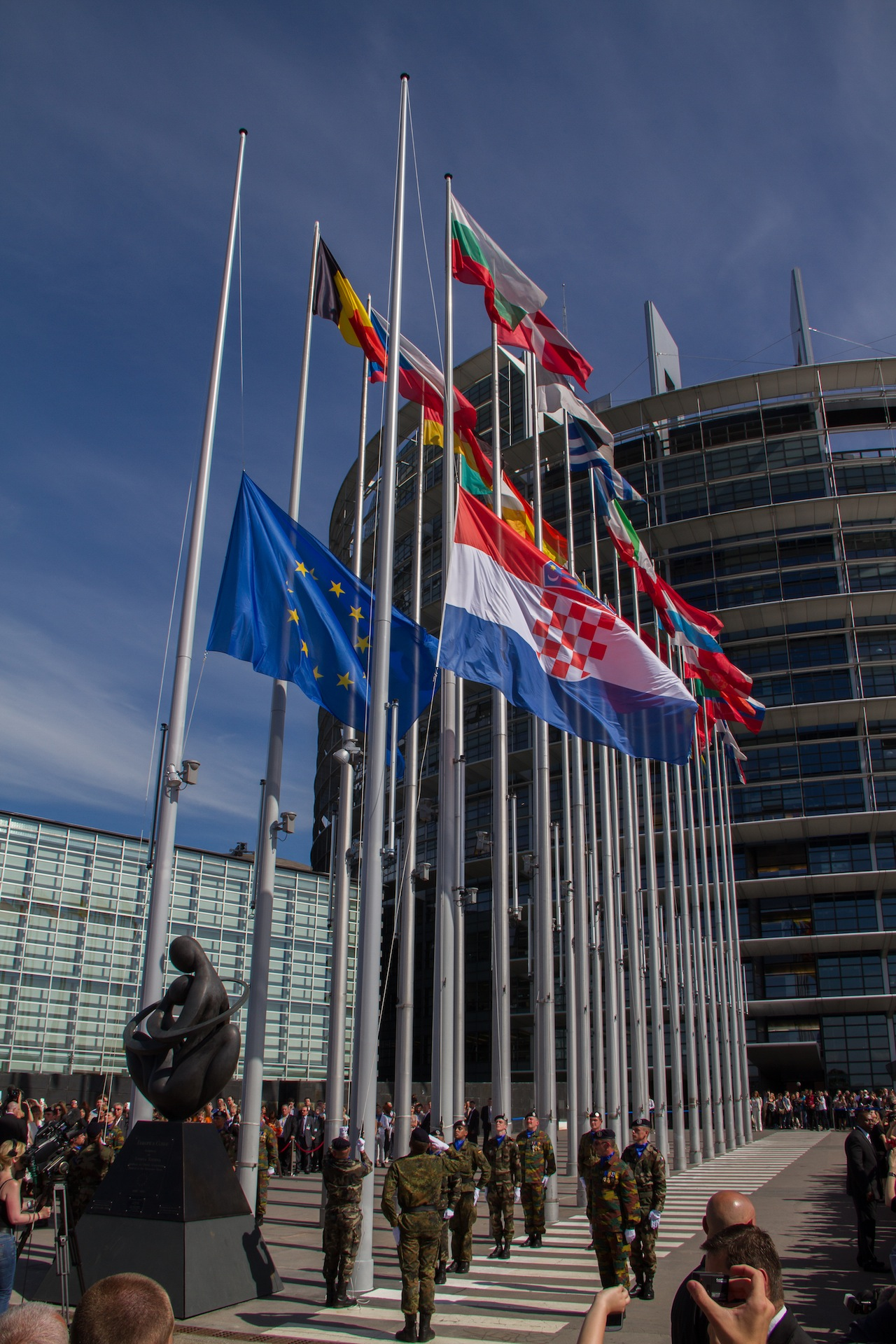
Croatian flag raised in the European Parliament after accession in 2013.

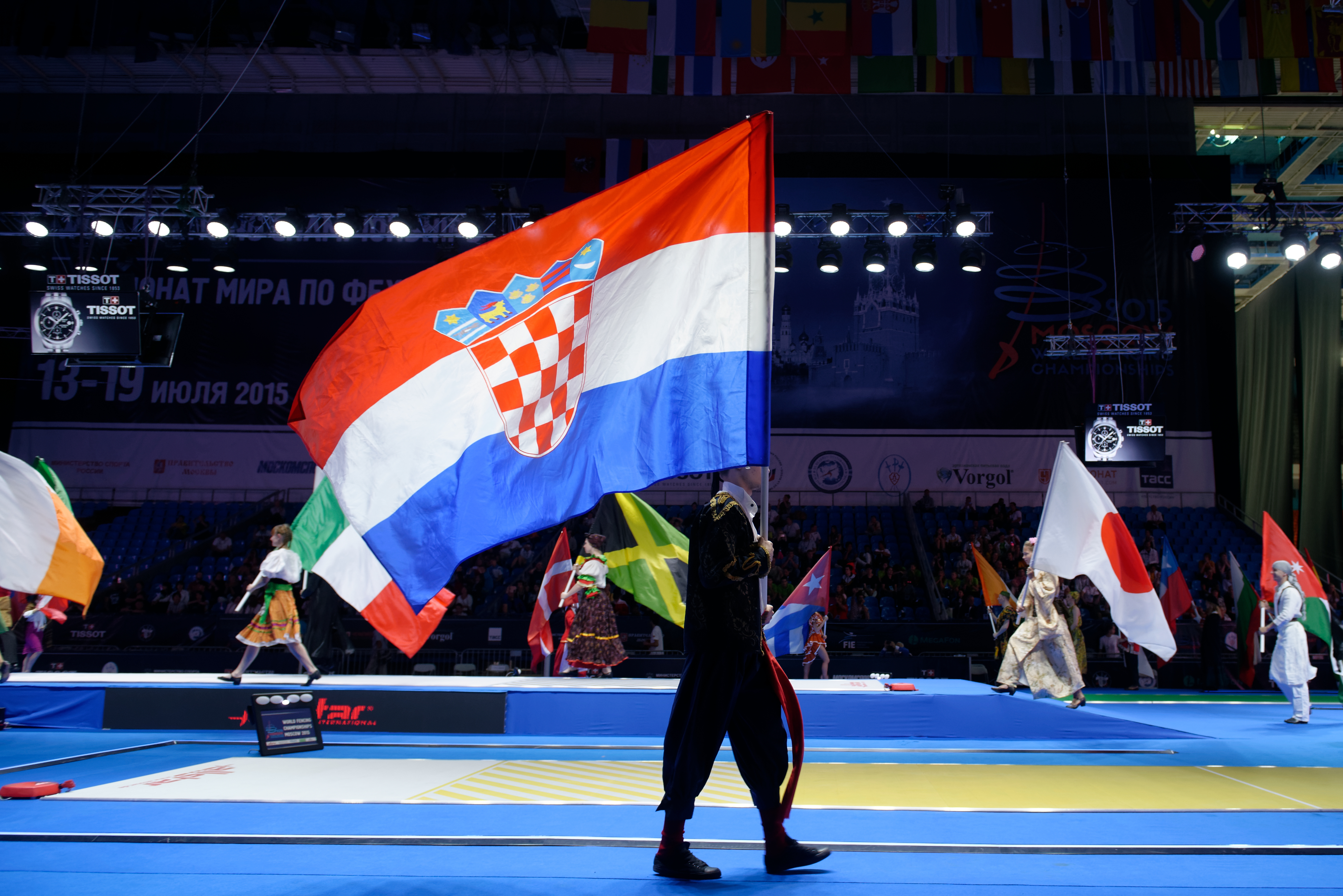
The Croatian flag during the 2015 World Fencing Championships opening ceremony in Moscow.

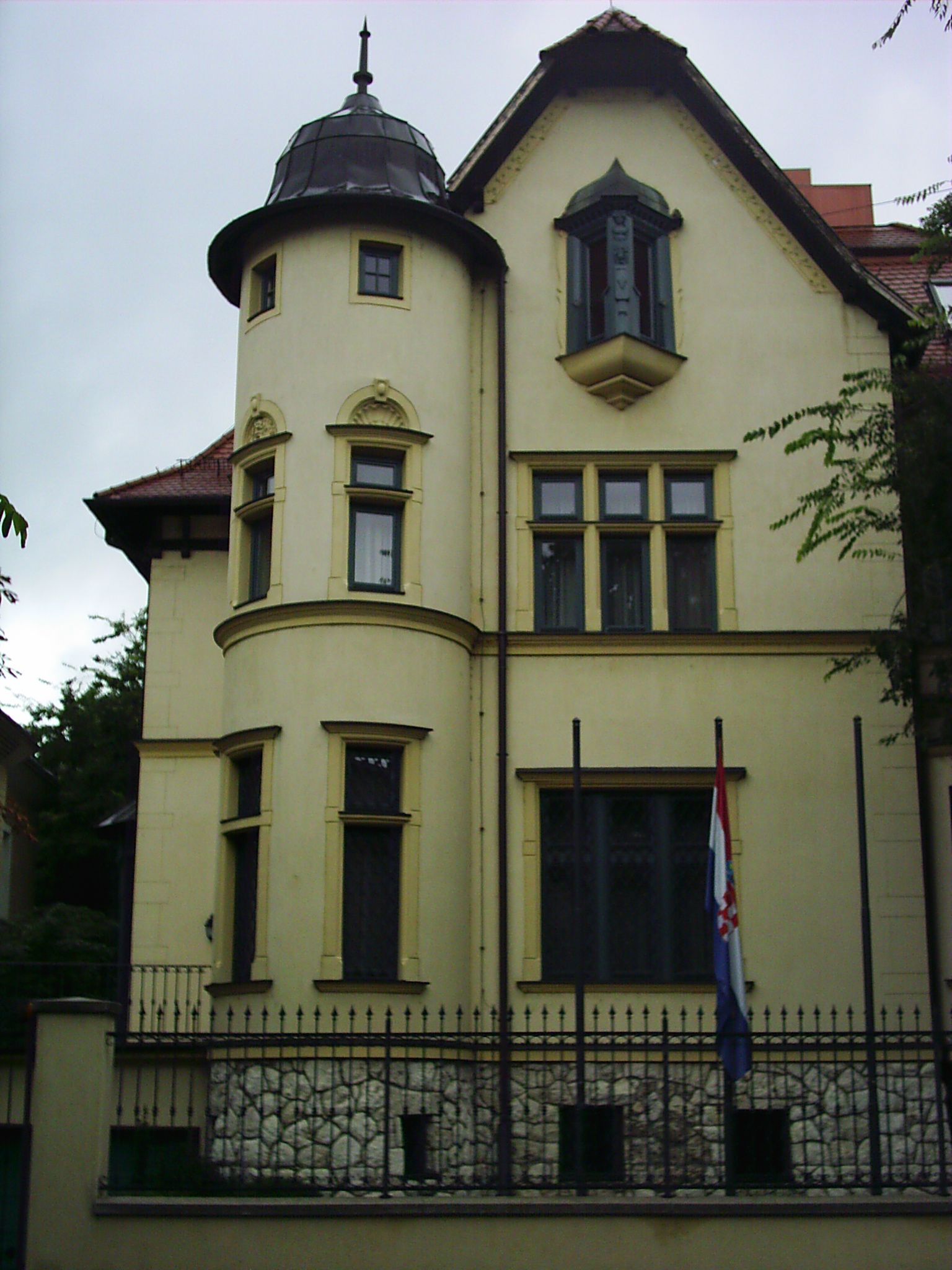
The flag in the Croatian Embassy in Budapest.

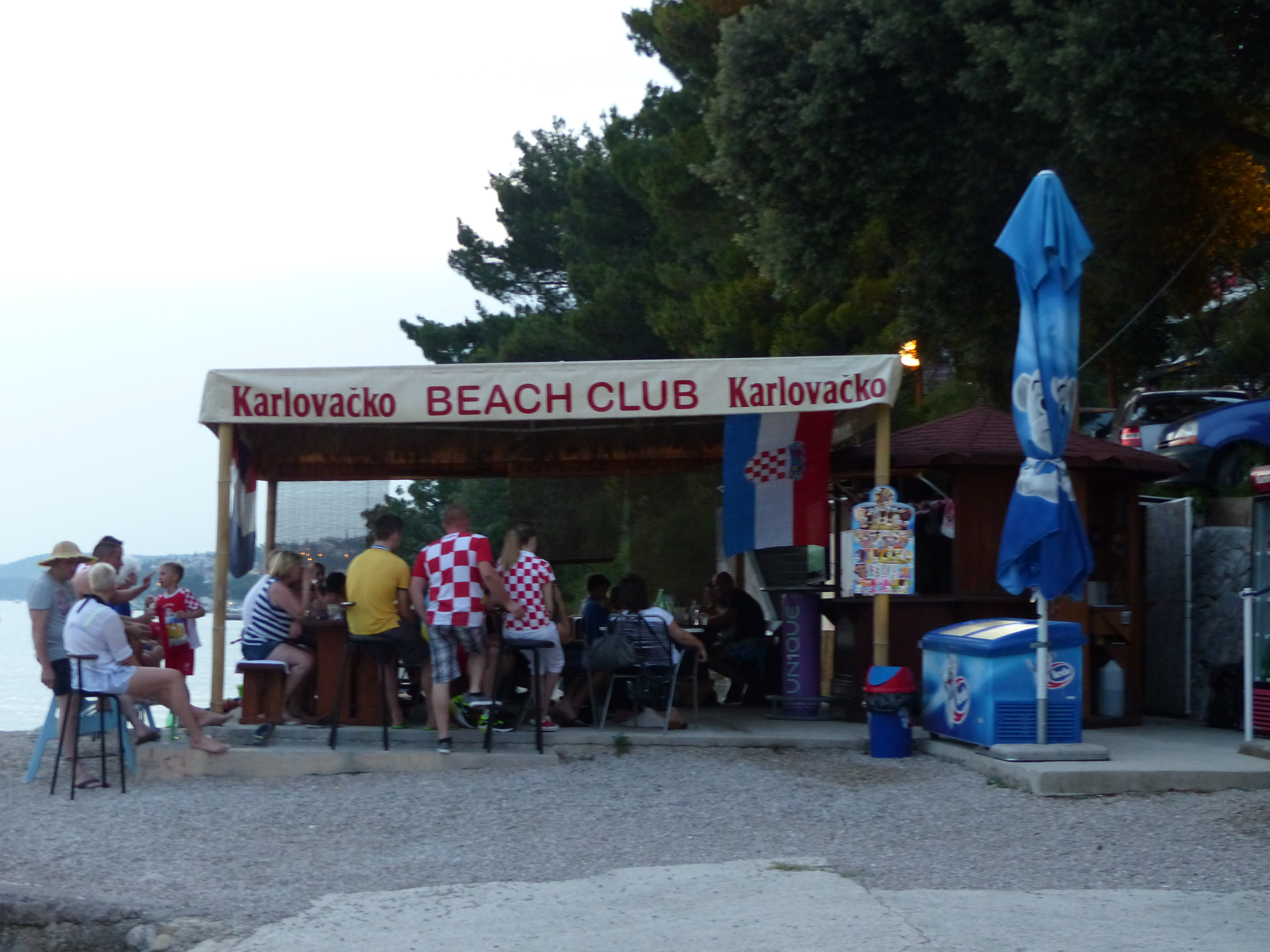
In Crikvenica, fans gathered with the Croatian flag watching the home team playing Portugal during the 2016 Independence Day holiday.

== See also ==
- List of Croatian flags
- Coat of arms of Croatia
- Flag of Yugoslavia
- Flag of the Netherlands
- Flag of Paraguay
