= Coat of arms of Croatia =

Versions
- Pantone version
- Armiger: Republic of Croatia
- Adopted: 21 December 1990

The coat of arms of the Republic of Croatia (Croatian: Grb Republike Hrvatske) consists of one main shield and five smaller shields which form a crown over the main shield. The main coat of arms is a checkerboard that consists of 13 red and 12 white fields. It is also known as the Croatian checkerboard (šahovnica, from šah, "chess"). The five smaller shields represent five different historical regions within Croatia. The checkerboard as a heraldic symbol of Croatia was introduced in the late 15th century, and officially since 1527 election in Cetin, replacing the original coat of arms of the Kingdom of Croatia and Dalmatia.

== Official description ==
Croatian law describes the coat of arms as follows:

The coat of arms of the Republic of Croatia is the historical Croatian coat of arms in the form of a shield twice divided horizontally and vertically into twenty-five red and white (silver) fields, so that the first field in the upper left corner is red. Above the shield lies a crown with five spikes, slightly arched with its ends conjoined with upper left and right parts of the shield. Within the crown, five lesser shields with historical Croatian coats of arms, lined from left to right in the following order: the oldest known Croatian coat of arms, coats of arms of the Dubrovnik Republic, Dalmatia, Istria and Slavonia. The ratio of height of the field of the main shield to the height of the smaller shields in the crown is 1:2.5, and of the width of the field of the main shield to the width of the smaller shields in the crown is 1:1. The oldest known coat of arms of Croatia contains in a shield on a light blue field a yellow (golden) six-pointed star with a white (silver) crescent. Coat of arms of the Republic of Dubrovnik contains in a shield on a blue field two red bars. The Dalmatian arms contain in a shield on a light blue field three yellow (golden) crowned lion heads. The Istrian arms contain in a shield on a blue field a yellow (golden) goat facing left with red hooves and horns. The Slavonian arms contain on a light blue field two horizontal white (silver) bars, between bars a red field, on which sneaks a marten to the left. In the upper light blue field is a yellow (golden) six-pointed star. The coat of arms is lined red.

However, according to Tomislav Galović, after recent academic publications, some of the information should be changed.

== History ==
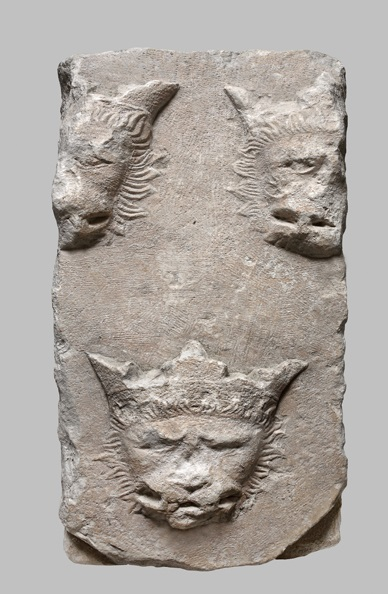
14th century coat of arms of the Kingdom of Croatia and Dalmatia from Bribir, then seat of the Šubić family.

The current coat of arms of Croatia was not the first coat of arms of Croatia, dating only since the late 15th century. The first coat of arms of Croatia showcased three leopards or lions heads, which since the late 15th century began to be associated as the coat of arms of Dalmatia. In that period, due to the Ladislaus of Naples selling of Dalmatia to Republic of Venice and Ottoman conquest of Bosnia and Herzegovina and Croatia, began disintegration of the Croatian lands because of which emerged separate coat of arms for Croatia, Dalmatia and Slavonia (but all of them representing in general the Kingdom of Croatia and Dalmatia).

Since the 15th century in various armorials existed also other rare variations, for example with three human heads instead, another with three running dogs (because in the German language the Slavs are also called Winden which reminds of "windhund"), and an arm brandishing a sword (originally of Hrvoje Vukčić Hrvatinić, and later usually associated with the coat of arms of Bosnia and Herzegovina). Sometimes the coat of arms of the Frankopan family, who at the time were one of the most powerful Croatian noble families, was also identified as the coat of arms of the Kingdom of Croatia.

=== Croatian checkerboard ===
The size of the checkerboard ranges from 3×3 to 8×8, but most commonly 5×5, like in the current design. Throughout history, its initial field was mostly in white color and ending in red color, but existed also other examples, as until the 19th century didn't have official standardization and description.

==== Meaning ====
Since the 19th century national revival in Croatia, the oldest Croatian coat of arms with three leopard/lion heads was appropriated by the Italian-Dalmatianist irredentist Autonomist Party, making the checkerboard coat of arms the preferred Croatian national symbol. As such, it sparked the need to find and prove its old age, and consequently fabrications of an early medieval origin. One tradition states it to be the arms of Stephen Držislav in the 10th century. A Split stone baptistry from the time of Peter Krešimir IV (r. 1058–1074/5) has engraved falcons that carry something that resembles a checkerboard on their wings, and the bell tower of the medieval Church of St. Lucy, Jurandvor has a checkerboard pattern carved onto it. It was traditionally conjectured that the colors originally represented Red Croatia and White Croatia, but there is no historical evidence to support this as well.

Recently modern scholars are arguing that the Croatian checkerboard coat of arms (CoA) was probably created under the influence of the Habsburg dynasty, replacing the first CoA with leopard/lion heads (becoming attributed to the Dalmatia, meanwhile in Venetian Dalmatia was replaced by the Lion of Saint Mark), which checkerboard with red-white fields stylistically to the trend of the time denotes the walls and forts as Antemurale Christianitatis.

==== Use ====
The checkerboard coat of arms (šahovnica) is first attested as a decorative symbol of the Kingdom of Croatia on an Innsbruck tower depicting the emblem of Maximilian I, Archduke of Austria in 1495, and Chiesa dei Domenicani in Bolzano, Italy also from the late 15th century. There's possible analogies dating to 1426 of Swedish nobleman Heindrik Kristiernsson who served Ivan VI Frankopan, and 1491 of Senj nobleman Ludovik Perović at the Co-Cathedral of the Assumption of Mary, Senj. It officially appeared on a seal from the Cetingrad Charter that confirmed the 1527 election of Ferdinand I, Archduke of Austria as new king of Croatia.

Towards the Late Middle Ages the distinction for the three crown lands (Croatia proper, Dalmatia, Slavonia) was made. The šahovnica was used as the coat of arms of Croatia proper & together with the shields of Slavonia and Dalmatia was often used to represent the whole of Croatia in Austria-Hungary. It was used as an unofficial coat of arms of the Kingdom of Croatia adopted in 1848 and as an official coat of arms of the post-1868 Kingdom of Croatia-Slavonia (both unofficially known as the Triune Kingdom). The two are the same except for the position of the šahovnica and Dalmatian coat of arms which are switched around & with different crowns used above the shield – the later employing St Stephen's crown (associated with Hungarian kings).

By late 19th century šahovnica had come to be considered a generally recognized symbol for Croats and Croatia and in 1919, it was included in the coat of arms of the Kingdom of Serbs, Croats and Slovenes (later the Kingdom of Yugoslavia) to represent Croats. When the Banovina of Croatia was formed, the šahovnica (checkerboard gules and argent) was retained as the official symbol.

The Ustaše regime which had ruled Croatia during the World War II superimposed their ideological symbol, the letter "U" above or around the šahovnica (upper left square white) as the official national symbol during their rule.

After the Second World War, the new Socialist Republic of Croatia became a part of the federal Second Yugoslavia. The šahovnica was included in the new socialist coat of arms. It was designed in the socialist tradition, including symbols like wheat for peasants and an anvil for workers, as well as a rising sun to symbolize a new morning and a red star for communism.

During the change to multiparty elections in Croatia (as part of the collapse of Communist rule in Eastern Europe from the late 1980s), and prior to the establishment of the current design, the šahovnica, shedding the communist symbols that were the hallmark of Croatia in the second Yugoslavia, reappeared as a stand-alone symbol as both the 'upper left square red' and 'upper left square white' variants. The choice of 'upper left square red' or 'upper left square white' was often dictated by heraldic laws and aesthetic requirements.

The first-field-white variant was adopted by the Republic of Croatia and used briefly in 1990. According to constitutional changes which came into effect on 26 June 1990 the red star in the flag of SR Croatia was to be replaced by the "historical Croatian coat of arms with 25 red and white fields", without specifying order of fields. The first-field-white variant was used at the official flag hoisting ceremony on 25 July and was later occasionally used on par with the first-field-red variant until 21 December 1990 when the current coat of arms was officially adopted.

== Current design ==
On 21 December 1990, the post-socialist government of Croatia, passed a law prescribing the design created by the painter and graphic artist Miroslav Šutej, under the aegis of a commission chaired by Nikša Stančić, then head of the Department of Croatian History at the Faculty of Philosophy, University of Zagreb. The new design added the five crowning shields which represent Croatian historical coat of arms, out of which four regions of Croatia. They are, from left to right:

| Central Croatia region – Considered the oldest known coat of arms representing Croatia: Bleu celeste, a mullet of six points Or surmounted above a crescent Argent – A golden six-pointed star (representing the morning star) over a silver crescent moon on a blue shield. The oldest example of the symbol is found on the obverse side of the Croatian Frizatiks minted by Andrew II as Duke of Croatia (Latin: Dux Croatiae). Such coins also had leopard/lion head or whole animal. The symbols of the crescent and moon were common at the time in Europe, and were borrowed from the previous coins minted by Archbishops of Salzburg in Friesach (hence the name). These symbols did not have any Croatian CoA state relevancy and significance in the medieval period. Traditionally this supposed coat of arms was depicted on red (gules) background such as the flag of the Triune Kingdom by Josip Jelačić in the 19th century. From the 16th century onward, Illyrian armorials was associated not only with Croatia, but with South Slavic land of "Illyria" in general, getting particular prominence in Pavao Ritter Vitezović's Stemmatografia (1701) and during the Illyrian movement in the 19th century. It is common misconception that it represents the first and oldest known CoA representing Croatia, dating as such only since the 19th century national revival. |
| Republic of Dubrovnik region, the southernmost of the Dalmatia region – Coat of arms of Dubrovnik: Azure, two bars gules – Two red stripes on a dark blue shield. This is a simplified variation of the Coat of arms of Dubrovnik, with two red bars instead of four; it was used by Dubrovnik Republic since the 14th century. The original coat of arms is the old coat of arms of Árpád dynasty, granted to Dubrovnik Republic by King Louis I in 1358 as it became a vassal of the Hungarian-Croatian king. The red-blue variant hails from the 1950s interpretation of the template (decorative) lines within the originally white lines of the original CoA. |
| Dalmatia region – Coat of arms of Dalmatia: Bleu celeste, three leopards' heads affrontés caboshed Or, crowned Or – Three golden, crowned heraldic leopard heads, two over one, on a blue shield. The depicted version from the crown differs from the traditional depiction of these arms: traditionally, the leopards are roaring and langued (i.e. with tongues visible), and the color of the shield is heraldic azure, not bleu celeste. Historically, this is the first and oldest coat of arms representing Kingdom of Croatia (and Dalmatia), and in use since at least the 13th century. The first officially recorded use goes back to King Louis I and his daughter Queen Mary who both used an earlier version of the arms as part of their personal coat of arms. Until 1526 this coat of arms was in the coat of arms of several kings: Louis I, Mary, Matthias Corvinus and Louis II. It is also found on the great seals of Sigismund of Luxembourg, Albert II, John Zápolya, Ferdinand I, and from then on various seals and arms of the Habsburgs. Originally the coat of arms was three lion heads on red background, turned to left. |
| Istria region – Coat of arms of Istria: Azure, a goat (buck goat) statant Or, attired and hoofed Gules – Golden goat (buck goat) with red hooves and horns, on a dark blue shield. The goat as a symbol of Istria is claimed to be associated with Istria since ancient times. However the origins of this coat of arms are unclear and until the 19th century there was no official symbol of Istria. The first depictions are found on the maps of Johann Weikhard von Valvasor in the 17th century and later in Stemmatographia sive armorum Illyricorum delineatio, descriptio et restitutio (1701) by Pavao Ritter Vitezović. It was only in 1861 when the March of Istria became the Crown land in the Austrian Empire that this coat of arms became official. Traditional depictions of the arms differed greatly depending on the authors: mostly depicted on a blue but sometimes also on green background, colors (tinctures) of the charge (goat – sometimes with gold and sometimes with red hooves and horns), position or attitude of the goat – sometimes shown as passant (passing with front leg up) and sometimes statant (standing with all four legs on the ground), orientation of the charge – sometimes turned to right and sometimes to left (dexter and sinister) and even the charge itself with some variants showing a female goat and some a buck goat (male goat). The current variant used in the crest and also as the coat of arms of County of Istria are both derived from the March of Istria arms from 1861 by Hugo Gerard Ströhl. |
| Slavonia region – Coat of arms of Slavonia: Bleu celeste, a fess Gules fimbriated Argent surmounted by a mullet of six points Or, a marten Sable courant proper in chief – Six-pointed star (morning star, but Mars instead of Venus) above two silver stripes on a blue shield (representing the rivers Drava and Sava marking the Northern and Southern border of Slavonia), between them a running Pine marten in natural colors (Kuna in Croatian – note the former currency Croatian kuna) on a red field. Historically correct version of the arms uses a heraldic blue rather than light blue (Bleu celeste). This coat of arms was derived from an earlier version found on Slavonian Banovac coins minted between 1235 and 1384, which showed a marten running on a field between two six-pointed stars. The coat of arms was officially granted by king Vladislaus II Jagiellon on December 8, 1496. It is only Croatian land which has preserved original coat of arms and description, stating that it received because of the Slavonian peoples heroic defense against the Ottoman Turks, and considered as "a special shield or rather a bulwark of this our Hungarian kingdom". In 1515 the Slavonian nobility opposed Vladislaus's call to help the Croatian nobility, using as excuse the received CoA because of defense of own and Hungarian southern borders. Since 1497 it was used as the official seal of the Slavonian Sabor, and since 1558 of unified Slavonian and Croatian Sabor until the late 19th century. |

More traditional heraldic pundits have criticized recent unorthodox designs such as adding a crown to the coat, varying shades of blue in its even fields, adding the red border around the coat, and using red and blue together. The government has accepted their criticism insofar as not accepting further nontraditional designs for the county coats of arms, but the national symbol has remained intact.

Unlike in many countries, Croatian design more commonly uses symbolism from the coat of arms, rather than from the Croatian flag. This is partly due to the geometric design of the shield which makes it appropriate for use in many graphic contexts (e.g. the insignia of Croatia Airlines or the design of the shirt for the Croatia national football team), and partly because the Pan-Slavic colors are present in many European flags.

=== Historical versions of the crown arms ===
Most coats of arms used in the crown on the modern-day coat of arms differ slightly from historically accurate versions.

"Illyrian" coat of arms

Coat of arms of Dubrovnik

Coat of arms of Dalmatia

Coat of arms of Istria

Coat of arms of Kingdom of Slavonia

== Gallery ==
First known example of Croatian checkerboard as depicted in Innsbruck, Austria (1495)

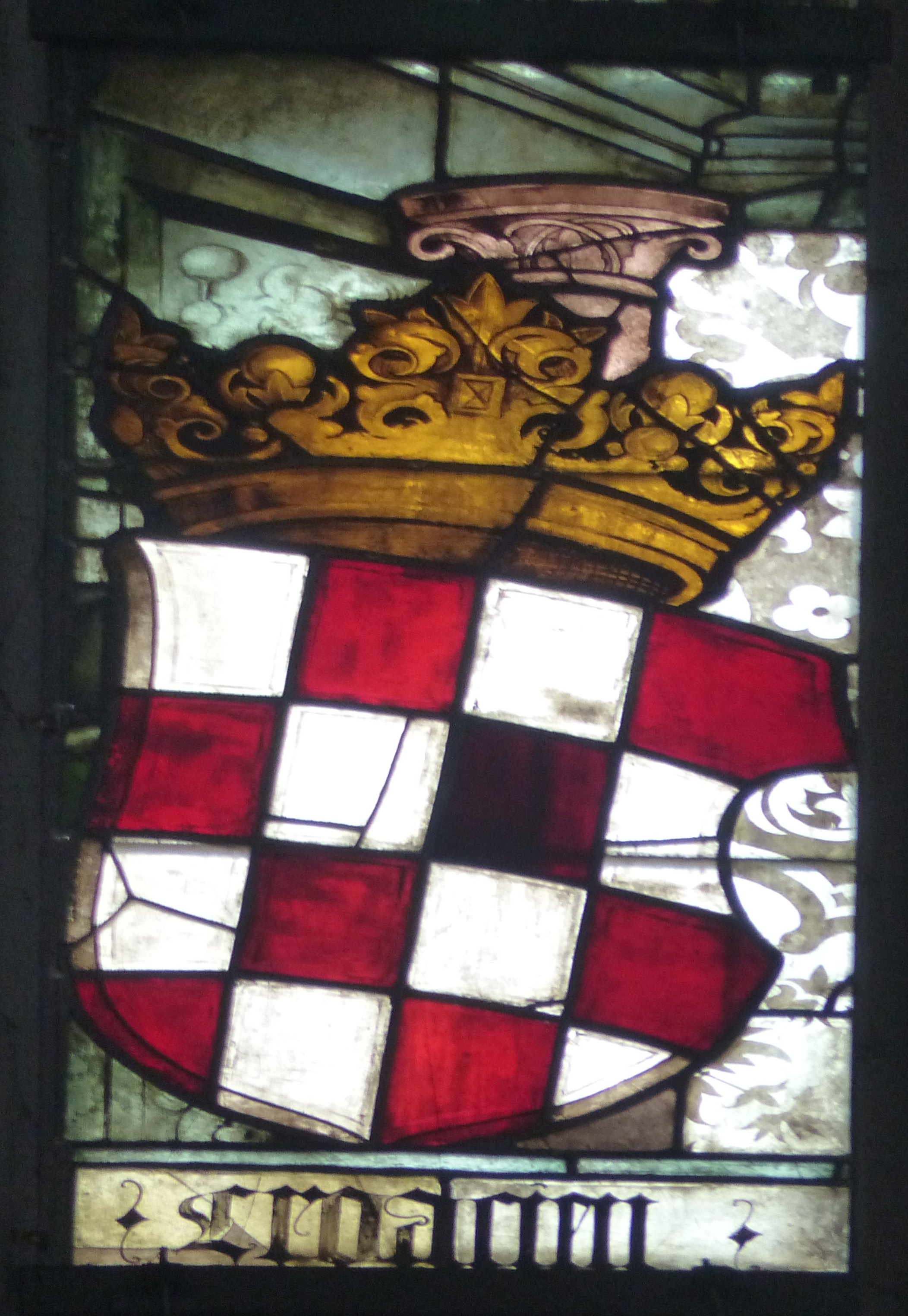
Coat of arms of Croatia as depicted in St. Sebaldus Church, Nuremberg (1514)

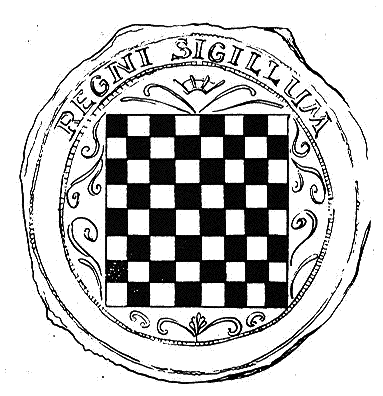
Coat of arms of Croatia used in 1527 as part of a seal on the Cetingrad Charter

Kingdom of Croatia (1525–1868)

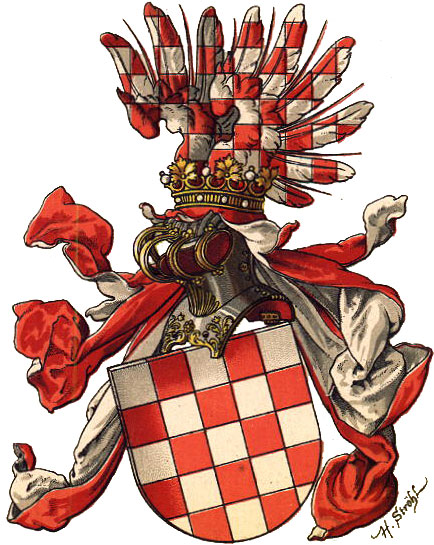
Coat of arms of Croatian Crown land (until 1868)

Kingdom of Croatia-Slavonia (1868–1918). The official version had St. Stephen's crown due to Croatia being part of Lands of the Crown of Saint Stephen.

Coat of arms of Transleithania (1868–1915)

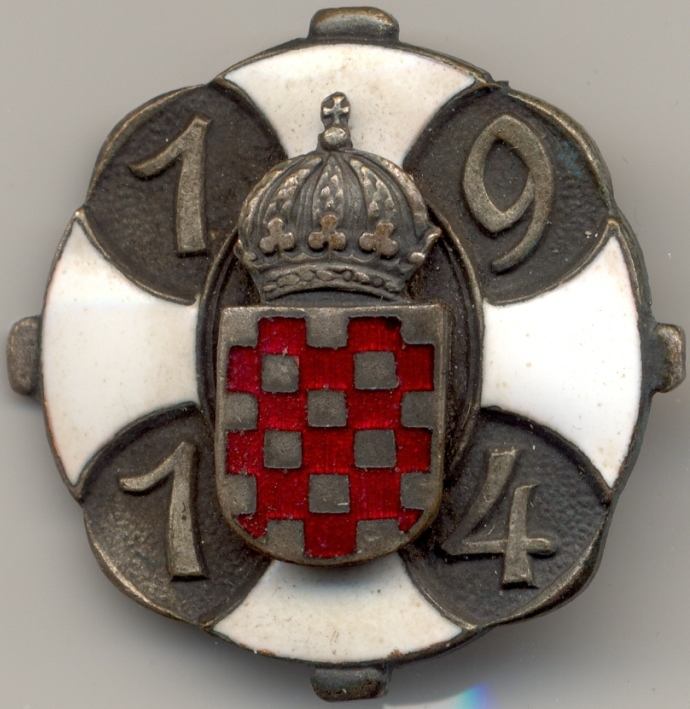
Patriotic badge from 1914

Lesser coat of arms of Transleithania (1915–1918)

Common coat of arms of Austria-Hungary (1915–1918)

Austria-Hungary, lesser version (1916–1918)

Coat of arms of Croatia (State of Slovenes, Croats and Serbs period)

Kingdom of Yugoslavia (1918–1941)

Banovina of Croatia (1939–1941)

Independent State of Croatia (1941–1945)

ZAVNOH & Federal State of Croatia (1943)

ZAVNOH & Federal State of Croatia (1943–1947)

Socialist Republic of Croatia (1947–1990)

Early coat of arms of the Republic of Croatia (1990)

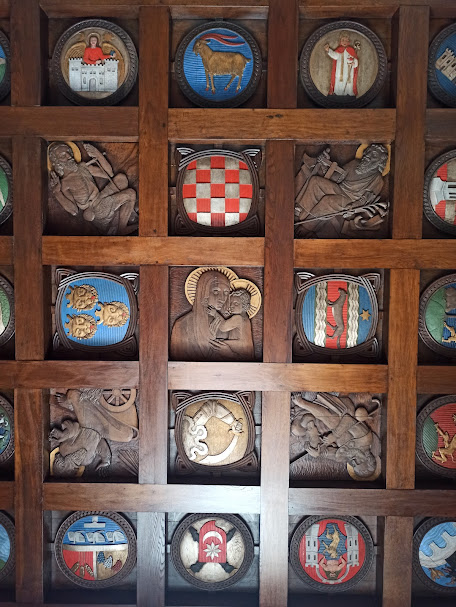
Historical Croatian coats of arms depicted in Church of the Mother of God of Sljeme, Queen of Croats

== See also ==
- Flag of Croatia
