= Coat of arms of Dalmatia =

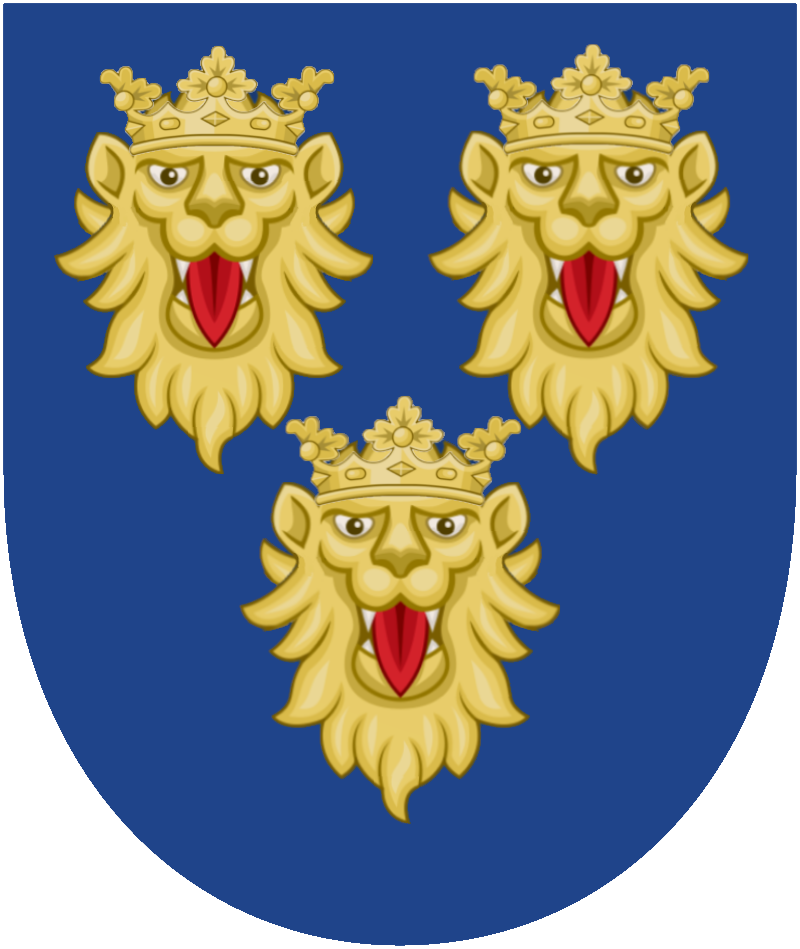
- Adopted: 13th century
- Supporters: Angels if part of the Hungarian coat of arms; Double-headed eagle (Reichsadler) if part of Imperial coat of arms
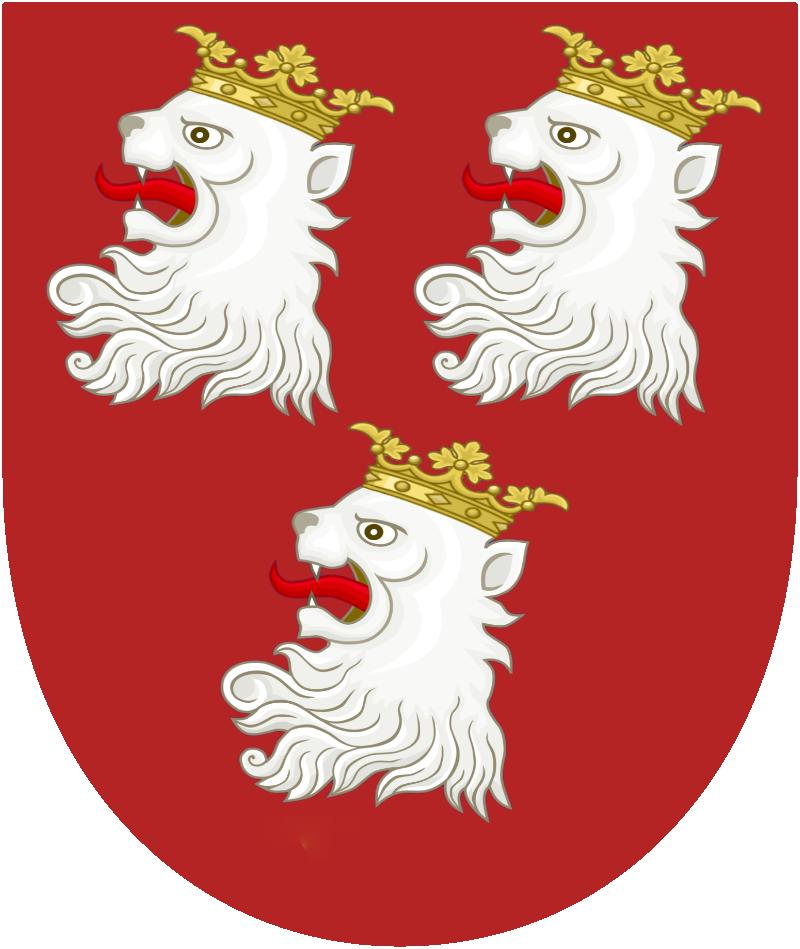
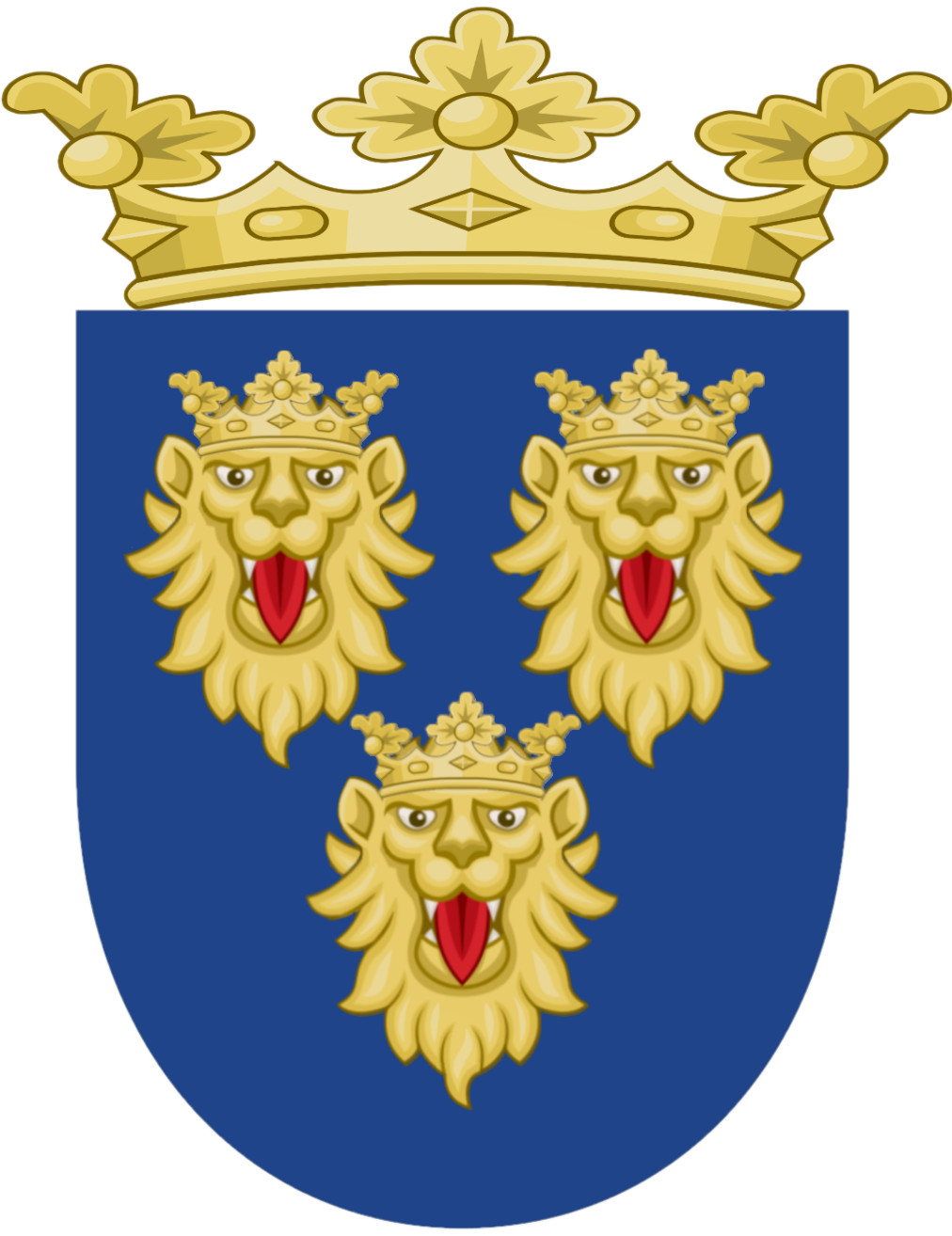
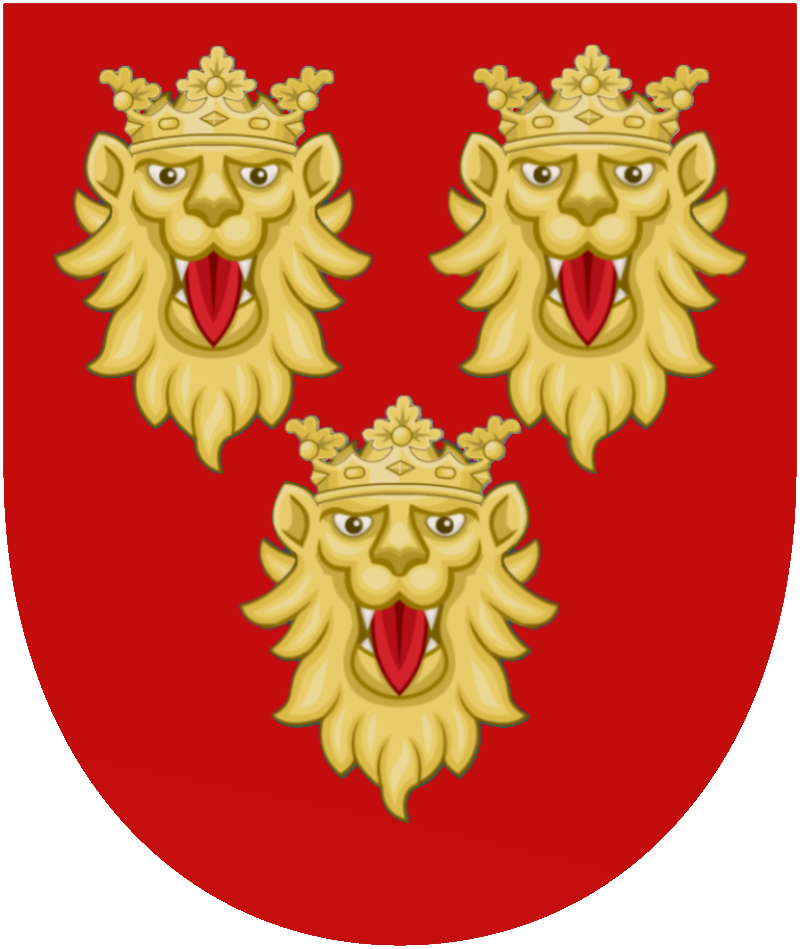
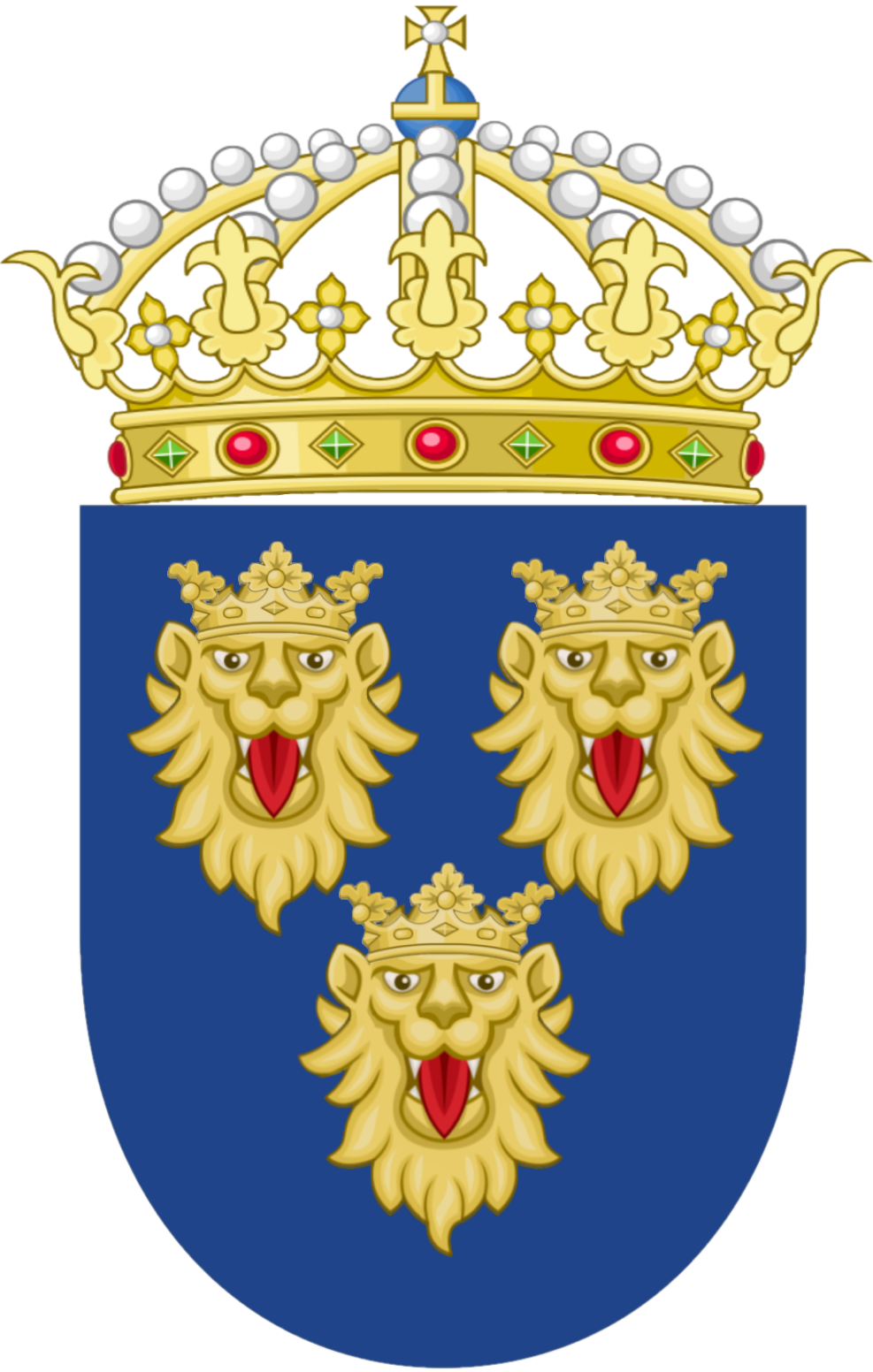
- Earlier version(s): Early type used by Kings of Hungary (Dalmatia and Croatia) (13-16th century) Crowned coat of arms by Holy Roman Emperors (15-18th century) Coat of arms from Chronicon Helveticum (16th century) Coat of arms of Kingdom of Dalmatia (1797–1805, 1815–1918)
- Use: For the Kingdom of Croatia and Dalmatia, Kingdom of Dalmatia and later regionally for Dalmatia

The coat of arms of Dalmatia is the heraldic symbol used for the historical region of Dalmatia on the eastern coast of Adriatic Sea, and previously the Kingdom of Croatia and Dalmatia until early 16th century. It is also featured on the crest of the coat of arms of Croatia. The arms have three golden lion heads, facing front, with golden crowns and red tongues, on a blue shield. The blazon, or formal heraldic description, is azure, with three crowned golden leopards' heads affrontés caboshed Or, langued in gules. The lions' heads affrontés were historically referred to as leopards, but this refers to their pose rather than species.

== History ==
The symbol of the leopard/lion heads is probably of Byzantine origin, and was used by the Hungarian kings and queens of the Árpád dynasty from the time of Béla III of Hungary (1172–1196; on coins Frizatik and Banovac, seal), until King Sigismund (1387–1437), but most prominently by those Hungarians who held the title of the Duke of Slavonia, which CoA would become state CoA of the Kingdom of Croatia and Dalmatia. Meanwhile the so-called Árpád stripes and the Hungarian Patriarchal cross became main elements of the royal coat of arms of Hungary.

Earliest depiction of the coat of arms are from 13th century. Armorial Vermandois (L'Armorial du Héraut Vermandois) from the year 1285 is showing variation showing one Lion head on shield with description "Le Roy Danit" archaic French for King of Dalmatia. A similar coat of arms in Herald's Roll (1270-1280) is attributed to the King of Hungary. Another second half of the 13th century depictions of the coat of arms is from the Armorial Wijnbergen in which is described as "le Roi dezclauonie", and from Lord Marshals' Roll from the year 1295 showing three silver heads on blue shield with description "Le Roy de Esclevoni" (the King of the Slavs i.e. Croats; the Hungarian kings and dukes, as well as foreign sources, used the term "totius Sclavonie" in the meaning of the Kingdom of Croatia and Dalmatia, see title Duke of Slavonia).

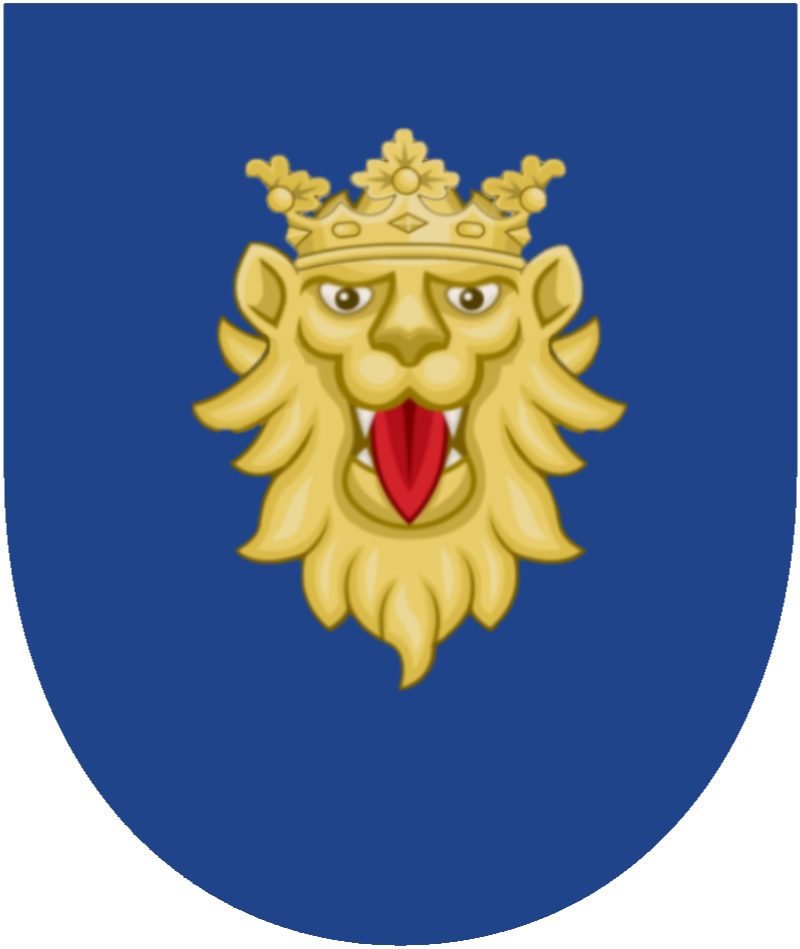
"Le Roy Danit" 1285.

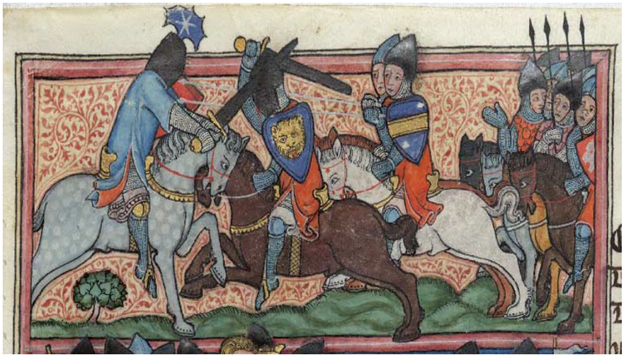
Vermandois (L'Armorial du Héraut Vermandois), "Le Roy Danit".

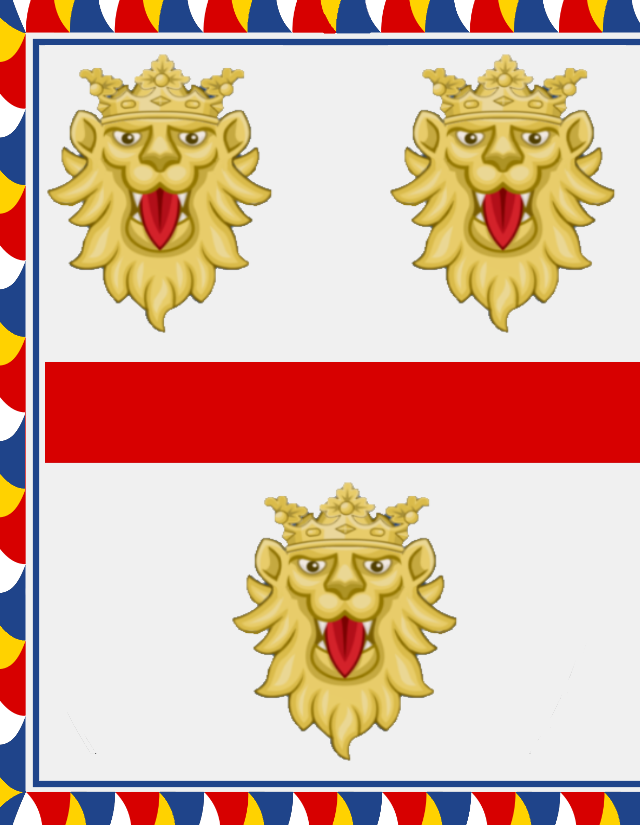
"Le Roy de Esclevoni" 1295.

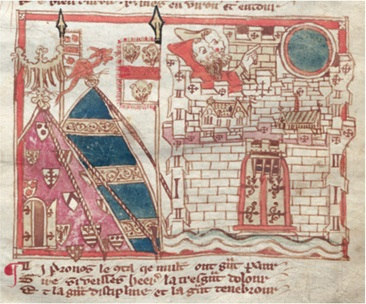
La Destructioun de Rome, "Le Roy de Esclevoni"

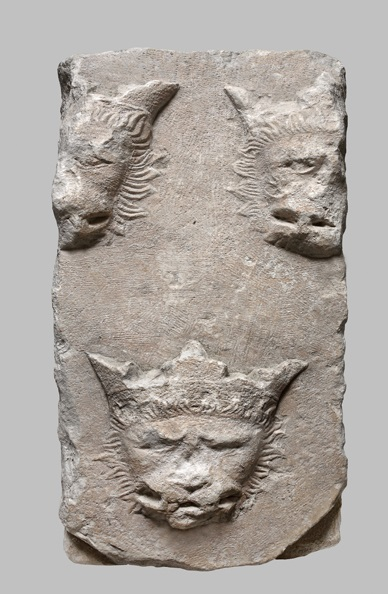
14th century coat of arms of the Kingdom of Croatia and Dalmatia from Bribir, seat of power of Šubić family, the most powerful Croatian noble family of the 14th century.

A more modern version of the CoA, with three golden crowned lions on blue shield, first appeared in 14th century Gelre Armorial (pre-1396) representing Kingdom of Croatia and Dalmatia (Regnum Croatiae et Dalmatiae) as part of the coat of arms of King Louis I (1342-1382). Hermann II, Count of Celje also started to use it in his CoA because of title's and estates in Croatia. Until 1526 these arms were used to represent Kingdom of Croatia in general, as can be seen from coat of arms of several kings: Louis I, Mary, Matthias Corvinus and Louis II. It is also found on the great seals of Sigismund, Holy Roman Emperor, Albert II, John Zápolya, Ferdinand I, and from then on, on various seals and arms of the Habsburgs. During the Republic of Venice's government of the Venetian Dalmatia, since the 16-17th century was used in Venetian decorative cartography, and some decorative armorials inspired by Illyrian armorials (e.g. on so-called unofficial "Greater coat of arms" of Venice from 1680, 1693 and 1706), but it was never included in the framework of its state emblem nor was it officially used by the Venetians who officially used only the Lion of Saint Mark.

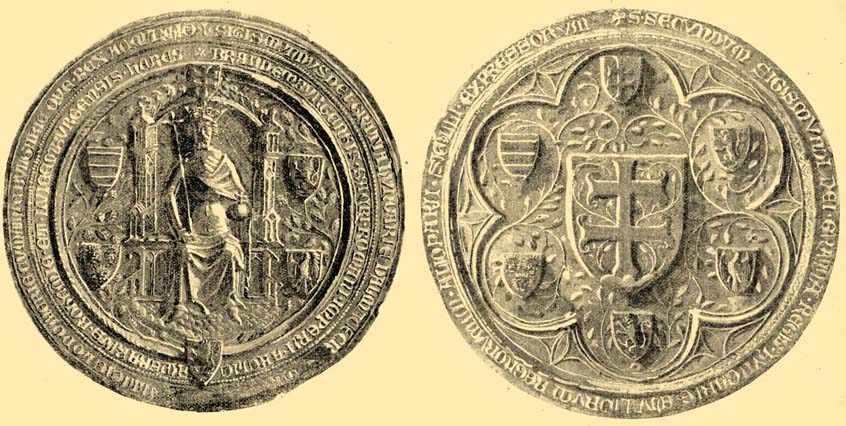
Coat of arms on the early 15th century seal of Sigismund, Holy Roman Emperor.

Historically there are two main variants of these arms:

- The most widely used version is: azure, with three crowned golden leopards' heads affrontés caboshed Or, langued in gules (three golden lion heads, facing front, with golden crowns and red tongues, on a blue shield). This variant dates from at least the very late 14th century, found on the Great Seal of King Sigismund of Luxembourg (1395-1437). In the Republic of Venice, like in the Great Arms (18th century), was decoratively used a variant with the same charge, but on a gules (red) shield, with the tongues often gold rather than gules. Between 1815 and 1918, the crowned variant of this coat of arms, with the azure shield, was used by the Habsburg Kingdom of Dalmatia. And from 1868 until 1918 as part of the coat of arms of Kingdom of Croatia-Slavonia in the upper dexter quarter.
- Another, earlier version, was: gules, with three lion heads argent, facing dexter, langued and crowned Or (meaning three white or silver lion heads, with golden crowns and tongues, turned to left, on a red shield). This variant dates from the mid-14th century as part of the arms of Louis I of Hungary (1342-1382). A variation of these arms (gules, with three lion heads Argent, facing dexter) representing Croatia appeared in the book called Beschreibung der Reise von Konstanz nach Jerusalem (1486).

== Arms charge ==
From a strictly heraldic point of view the charges on the arms are not lions but heraldic leopards. The heraldic leopard differs from the real-life leopard (Panthera pardus). It does not have any spots and often has a mane. Therefore, in heraldry, the leopard is generally similar, and is often referred to as a lion (Panthera leo). The reason for this lies in the fact that in the Middle Ages leopards were thought to be a crossbreed between a lion and a pard.

== Military usage ==
The presence of the Dalmatian coat of arms in military units raised in Dalmatia spans from the Middle Ages to modern times, reflecting the region’s evolving political and military affiliations. In the medieval period, as Dalmatian cities like Zadar and Split aligned with various powers such as Venice and Hungary, local militias and city guards sometimes bore symbols tied to regional identity, including early forms of the Dalmatian arms. During the Habsburg rule, the coat of arms—depicting three crowned leopard heads—became more formalized and prominently featured in the insignia, standards, and uniforms of Dalmatian regiments, signifying their provincial origin within the imperial military framework. Even into the 20th century, echoes of this heraldic tradition persisted in military and paramilitary units during both World Wars and the Yugoslav wars period, serving as a cultural and historical reference point for Dalmatian identity within broader national armies.

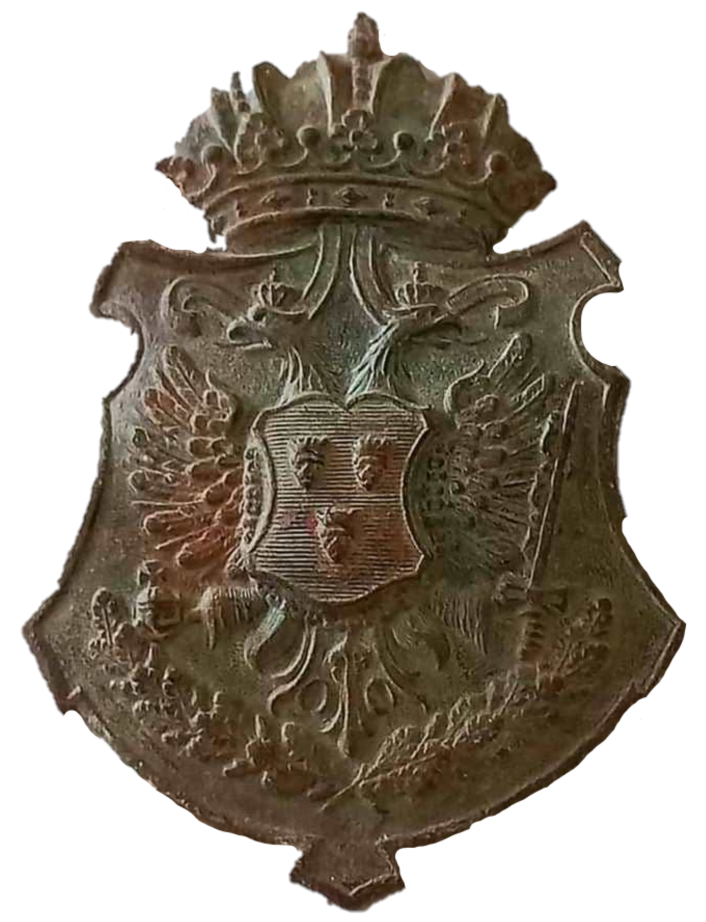
Dalmatian Landwehr badge from the 1870s

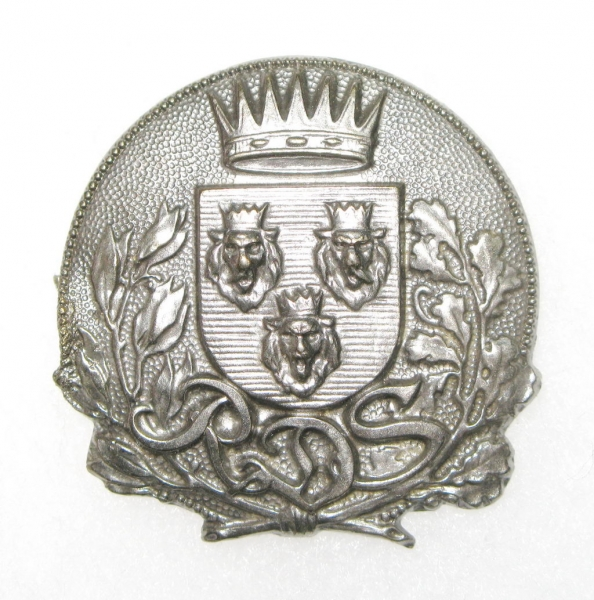
Dalmatian Cavalry Landwehr badge

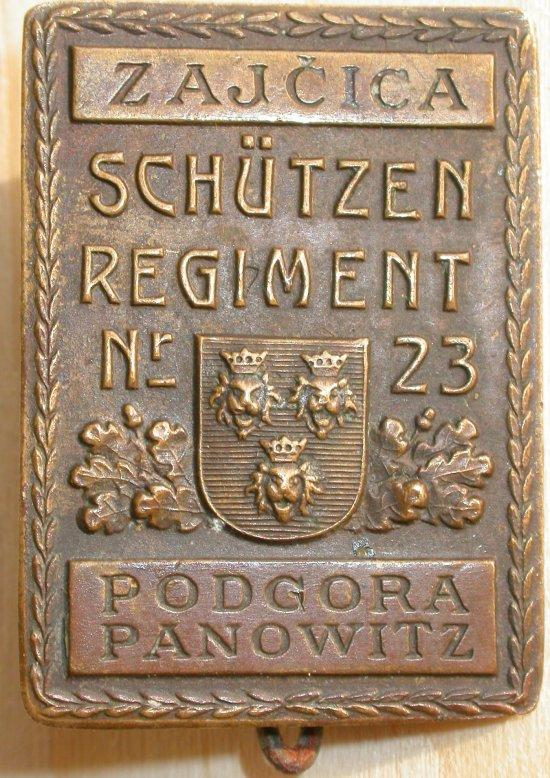
Dalmatian 23rd Landwehr Regiment badge from the WW1

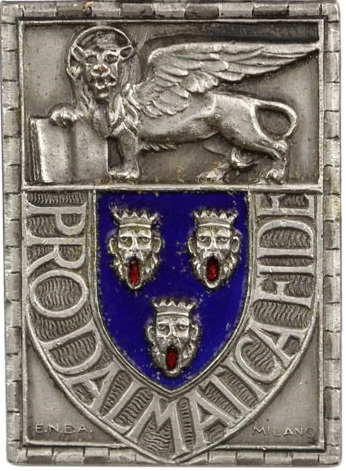
Blackshirts Dalmatian badge from WW2

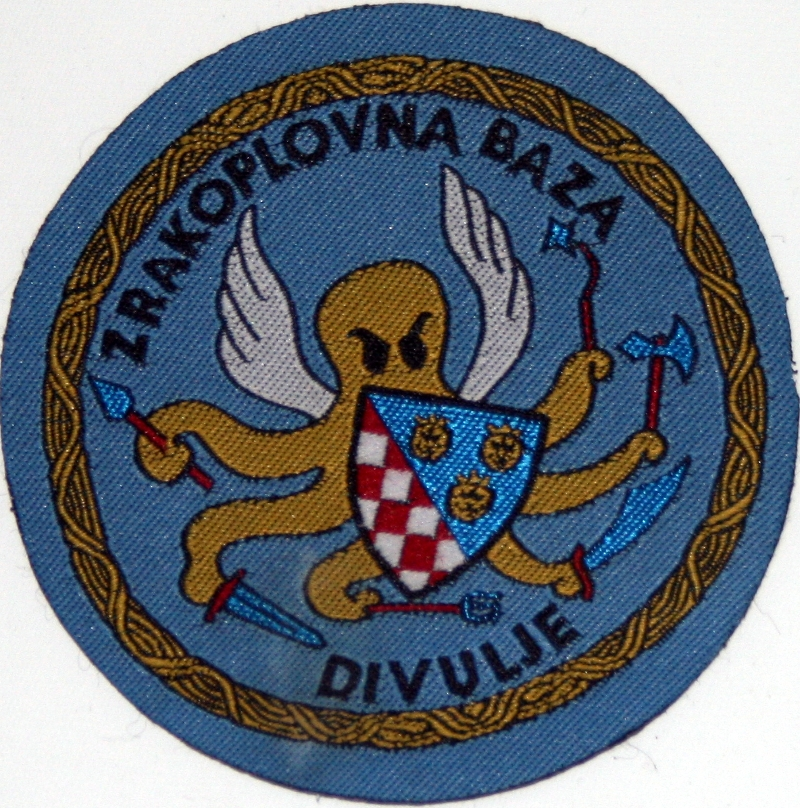
95th Airforce Base Divulje

== Gallery ==
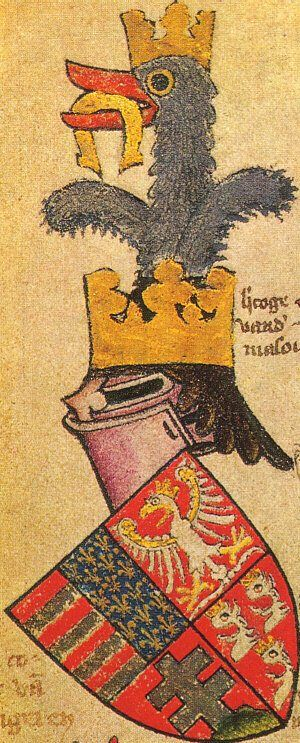
As part of the arms of King Louis I - lower right quarter (Gelre Armorial, 14th century).

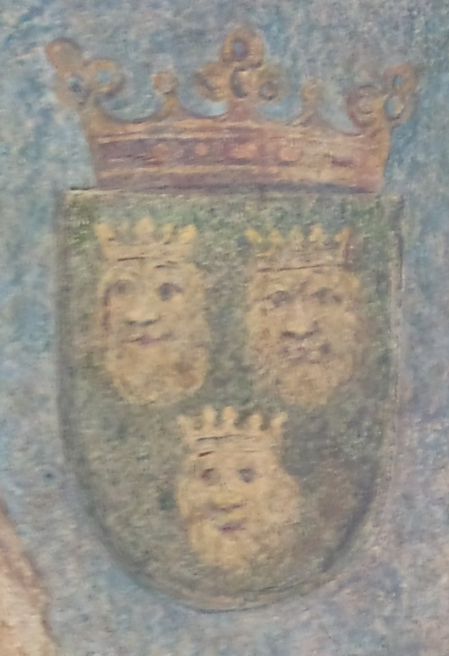
Coat of arms of Dalmatia depicted on a building fresco in Innsbruck, Austria (1495).

As part of the great seal of King Matthias Corvinus (1458-1490).

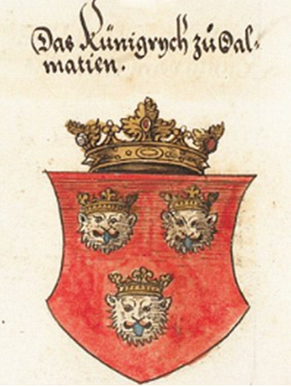
Red version from Chronicon Helveticum (1576)

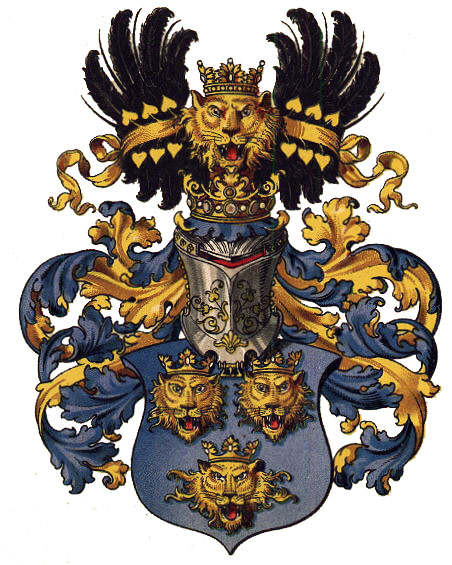
Arms of Dalmatia in Austria-Hungary (1851-1918), as drawn by Hugo Gerard Ströhl.

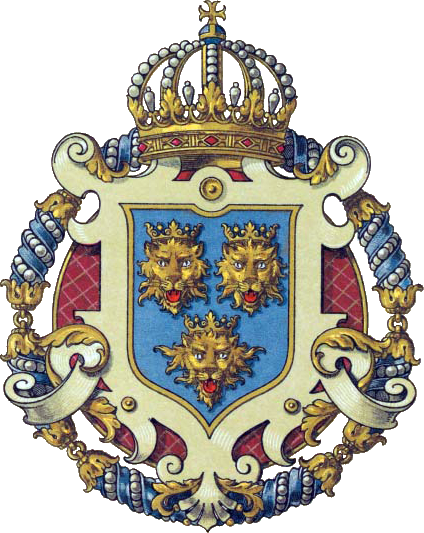
Kingdom of Dalmatia (1815-1918), as drawn by Hugo Gerard Ströhl.

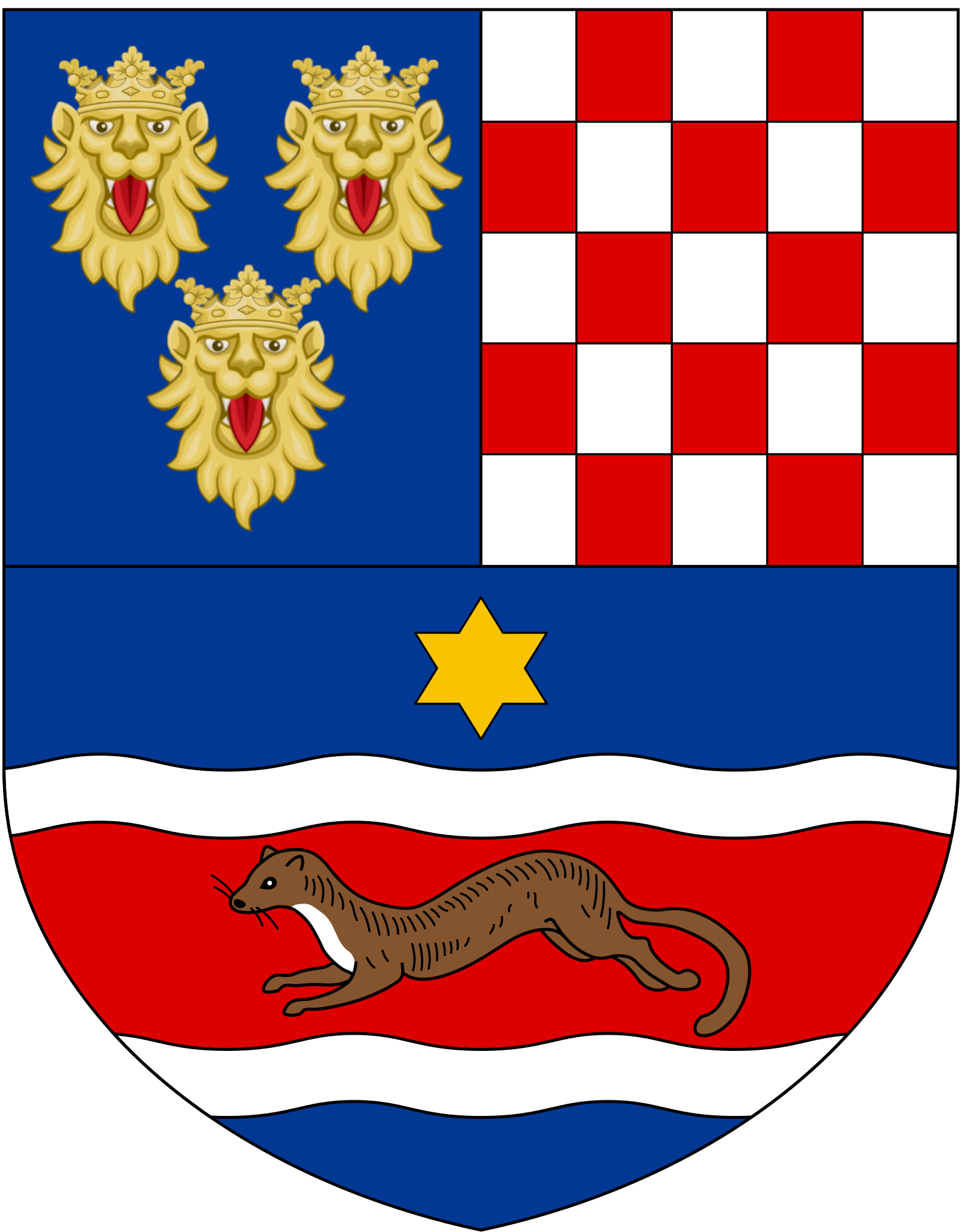
As part of the arms of Triune Kingdom (1868-1918).

Dalmatia, as part of the coat of arms of the Kingdom of Hungary.

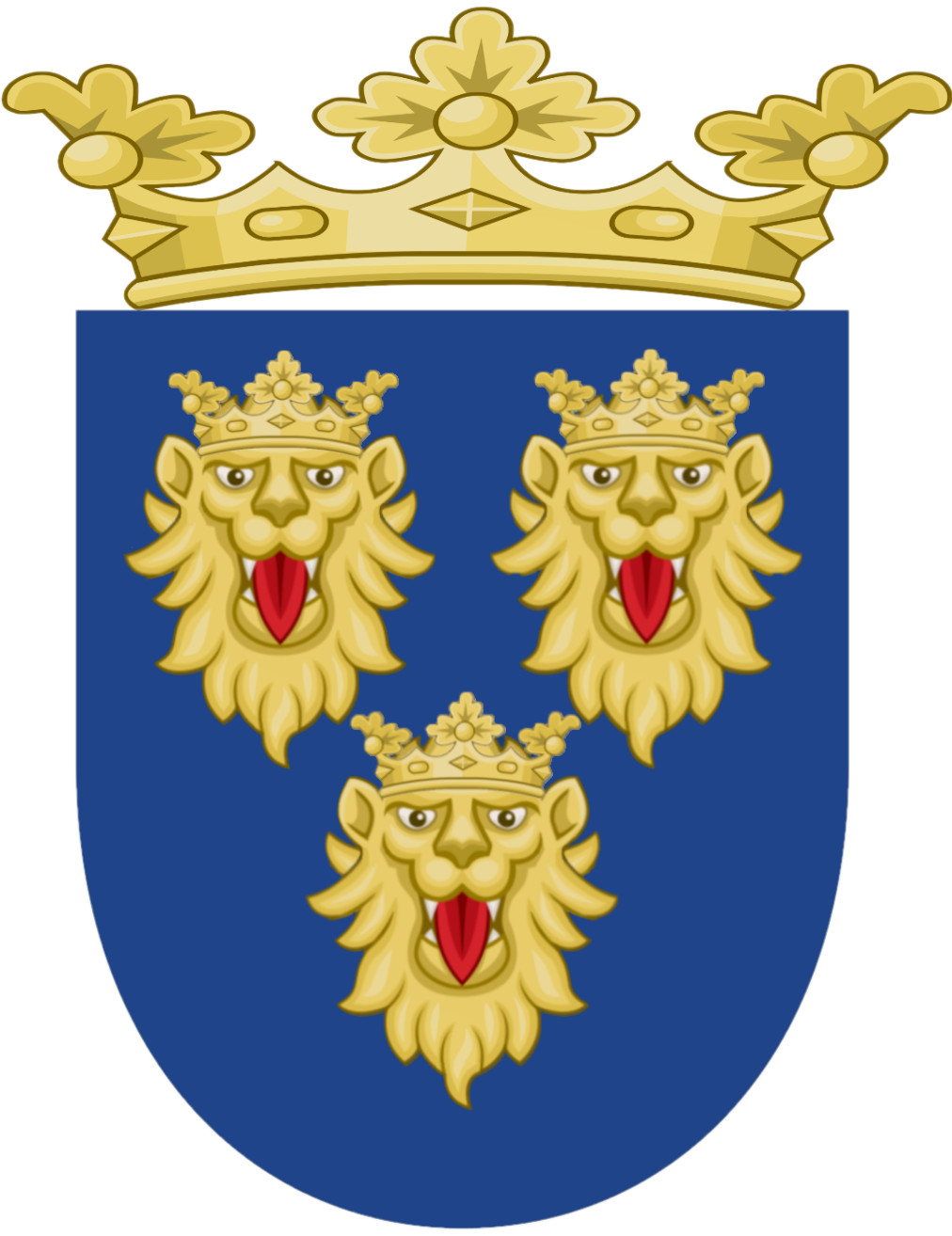
Vectored version of Coat of arms of Dalmatia depicted on a building fresco in Innsbruck, Austria (1495).

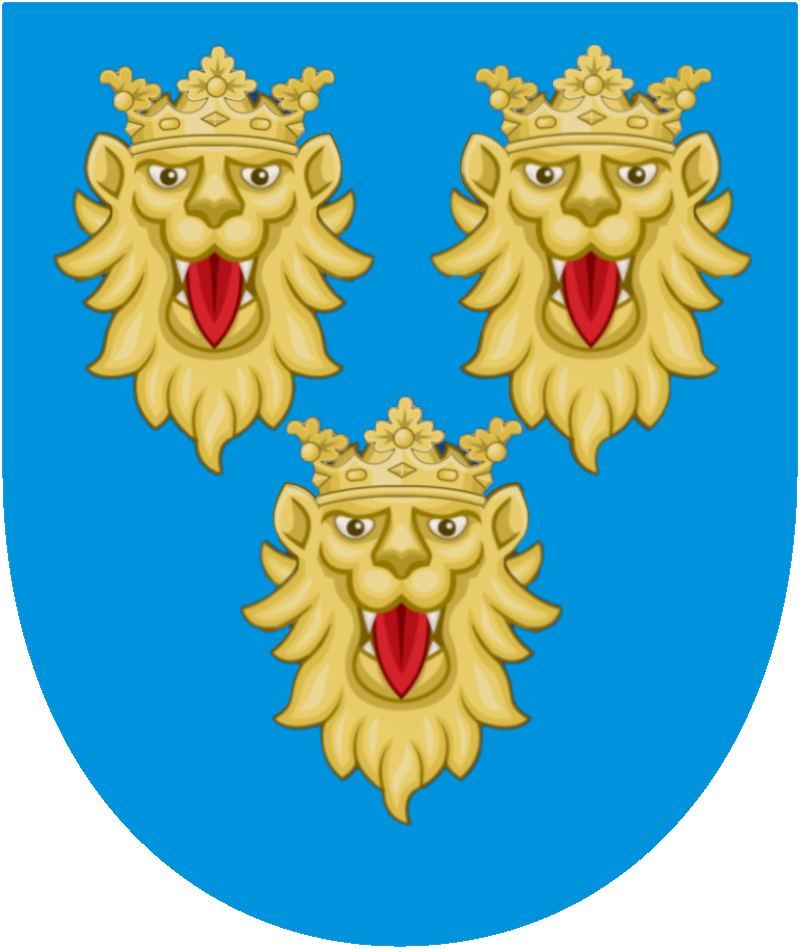
Coat of arms of Dalmatia with color pallet as depicted in Croatian coat of arms

== See also ==
- Flag of Dalmatia
- Dalmatia
- History of Dalmatia
- Kingdom of Dalmatia
- Coat of arms of Croatia
- Flags of Croatia
