= List of universities in Europe founded after 1945 =

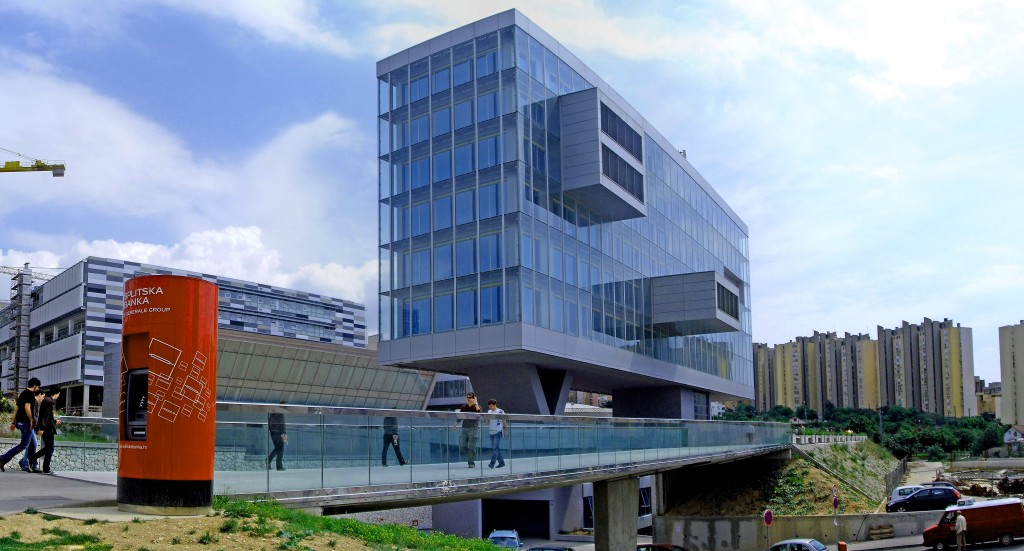
Library of the University of Split, founded in 1974

The following universities have been founded in Europe since the end of World War II.

No universities were established in Switzerland and Malta during this period.

== List ==
The list is sorted alphabetically.

=== Albania ===
Founded	City	University
1957	Tirana	University of Tirana
1991	Tirana	Polytechnic University of Tirana

=== Austria ===
Founded	City	University
1962	Salzburg	University of Salzburg
1962/6	Linz	Johannes Kepler University Linz
1970	Klagenfurt	Alpen-Adria-Universität Klagenfurt
1973	Linz	University of Art and Design Linz

=== Belarus ===
Founded	City	University
1945	Brest	A.S. Pushkin Brest State University
1951	Grodno	Grodno State Agrarian University
1961	Gomel	Francysk Skaryna Homiel State University
1978	Hrodna	Hrodna State University
1992	Minsk	Belarusian State Academy of Music
1992	Horki	Belarusian State Agricultural Academy
1993	Minsk	Belarusian State Technological University
1993	Navapolatsk	Polotsk State University
1994	Minsk	Maxim Tank Belarusian State Pedagogical University
1994	Vitebsk	Vitebsk State Academy of Veterinary Medicine

=== Belgium ===
Founded	City	University
1965	Mons	Facultés universitaires catholiques de Mons
1965	Mons	Faculté polytechnique de Mons
1965	Mons	University of Mons-Hainaut
1968	Leuven	Katholieke Universiteit Leuven
1968	Louvain-la-Neuve	Université catholique de Louvain
1969	Brussels	Facultés universitaires Saint-Louis
1969	Brussels	Université Libre de Bruxelles
1969	Brussels	Vrije Universiteit Brussel
1991	Hasselt	Hasselt University
2003	Antwerp	University of Antwerp
2007	Brussels	Hogeschool-Universiteit Brussel
2007	Mons	University of Mons

=== Bosnia-Herzegovina ===
Founded	City	University
1949	Sarajevo	University of Sarajevo
1975	Banja Luka	University of Banja Luka
1976	Tuzla	University of Tuzla
1977	Mostar	University Džemal Bijedić of Mostar
1992	Istočno Sarajevo	University of East Sarajevo
1992	Mostar	University of Mostar
1997	Bihać	University of Bihać
2000	Zenica	University of Zenica

=== Bulgaria ===
Founded	City	University
1971	Veliko Tarnovo	Veliko Tarnovo University
1972	Plovdiv	Plovdiv University
1995	Bourgas	Prof. Dr. Assen Zlatarov University
1995	Gabrovo	Technical University of Gabrovo
1995	Pleven	Medical University Pleven
1995	Sofia	Sofia Medical University
1995	Sofia	Technical University of Sofia
1995	Sofia	Agricultural University
1995	Varna	Medical University of Varna

=== Croatia ===
Founded	City	University
1973	Rijeka	University of Rijeka
1974	Split	University of Split
1975	Osijek	University of Osijek
2002	Zadar	University of Zadar
2003	Dubrovnik	University of Dubrovnik
2006	Pula	Juraj Dobrila University of Pula

=== Cyprus ===
Founded	City	University
1989	Nicosia	University of Cyprus
2002	Nicosia	Open University of Cyprus
2004	Limassol	Cyprus University of Technology
2007	Nicosia	University of Nicosia
2007	Nicosia	European University Cyprus
2007	Nicosia	Frederick University
2007	Paphos	Neapolis University Paphos

=== Czech Republic ===
Founded	City	University
1945/6	Prague	Academy of Performing Arts in Prague
1946	Prague	Academy of Arts, Architecture and Design in Prague
1947	Brno	Janáček Academy of Music and Performing Arts
1950	Pardubice	University of Pardubice
1952	Prague	Czech University of Life Sciences Prague
1952	Prague	Institute of Chemical Technology in Prague
1953	Prague	University of Economics, Prague
1991	České Budějovice	University of South Bohemia in České Budějovice
1991	Ostrava	University of Ostrava
1991	Opava	Silesian University (Opava)
1991	Plzeň	University of West Bohemia
1991	Ústí nad Labem	Jan Evangelista Purkyně University in Ústí nad Labem
1994	Liberec	Technical University of Liberec

=== Denmark ===
Founded	City	University
1966	Odense	Odense University
1972	Roskilde	Roskilde University
1974	Aalborg	Aalborg University

=== Estonia ===
Founded	City	University
1951	Tartu	Estonian University of Life Sciences
1991	Tallinn	University Nord

=== Finland ===
Founded	City	University
1950	Turku	Turku School of Economics
1958	Oulu	University of Oulu
1966	Tampere	University of Tampere
1966	Jyväskylä	University of Jyväskylä
1966/9	Lappeenranta	Lappeenranta University of Technology
1972	Tampere	Tampere University of Technology
1977	Vaasa	University of Vaasa
1979	Rovaniemi	University of Lapland
1982	Helsinki	Sibelius Academy
1983	Helsinki	Aalto University School of Art and Design
1984	Joensuu	University of Joensuu
1984	Kuopio	University of Kuopio
1987	Helsinki	Theatre Academy (Finland)
1993	Helsinki	Finnish National Defence University

=== France ===
Founded	City	University
1964	Villeurbanne	École nationale supérieure des sciences de l'information et des bibliothèques (in French)
1965	Paris	École nationale du génie rural, des eaux et des forêts (in French)
1968	Lille	Hautes études d'ingénieur
1970	Amiens	University of Picardie Jules Verne
1970	Talence	Bordeaux I
1970	Bordeaux	Bordeaux II (Victor Segalen)
1970	Pessac	Bordeaux III (Michel de Montaigne)
1970	Brest	University of Western Brittany
1970	Caen	University of Caen Lower Normandy
1970	Clermont-Ferrand	Clermont-Ferrand I (Auvergne)
1970	Clermont-Ferrand	Clermont-Ferrand II (Blaise Pascal)
1970	Dijon	University of Burgundy
1970	Grenoble	Grenoble I (Joseph Fourier)
1970	Grenoble	Grenoble II (Sciences Po Grenoble)
1970	Grenoble	Grenoble III (Stendhal)
1970	Villeneuve d'Ascq	Lille I (Science and Technology)
1970	Lille	Lille II (Health and Law)
1970	Villeneuve d'Ascq	Lille III (Charles de Gaulle)
1970	Limoges	University of Limoges
1970	Villeurbanne	Lyon I (Claude Bernard)
1970	Lyon	Lyon II (Lumière)
1970	Marseille	Aix-Marseille I (Provence)
1970	Montpellier	Montpellier I
1970	Montpellier	Montpellier II (Sciences and Techniques)
1970	Montpellier	Montpellier III (Paul Valéry)
1970	Nancy	Nancy I (Henri Poincaré)
1970	Nancy	Nancy II
1970	Nancy	School of architecture of Nancy
1970	Orléans	University of Orléans
1970	Paris	Pantheon-Sorbonne University
1970	Paris	Panthéon-Assas University
1970	Paris	Paris III (Sorbonne Nouvelle)
1970	Paris	Paris-Sorbonne University
1970	Paris	Paris V (Paris Descartes)
1970	Paris	Pierre-and-Marie-Curie University
1970	Paris	Paris VII (Paris Diderot)
1970	Paris	Paris VIII (Vincennes in Saint-Denis)
1970	Paris	Paris IX (Paris Dauphine)
1970	Paris	Paris X (West Paris)
1970	Paris	Paris XI (South Paris)
1970	Paris	Paris XII (East Paris)
1970	Paris	Paris XIII (North Paris)
1970	Pau	University of Pau and Pays de l'Adour
1970	Poitiers	University of Poitiers
1970	Reims	University of Reims Champagne-Ardenne
1970	Rennes	Rennes I
1970	Rennes	Rennes II (Haute-Bretagne)
1970	Rouen	University of Rouen
1970	Saint-Étienne	Jean Monnet University
1970	Strasbourg	Strasbourg I (Louis Pasteur)
1970	Strasbourg	Strasbourg II (Marc Bloch)
1970	Strasbourg	Strasbourg III (Robert Schuman)
1970	Toulouse	Toulouse I (Capitole)
1970	Toulouse	Toulouse II (Le Mirail)
1970	Toulouse	Toulouse III (Paul Sabatier)
1970	Tours	François Rabelais University
1971	Nice	University of Nice Sophia Antipolis
1972	Angers	University of Angers
1972	Compiègne	University of Technology of Compiègne
1973	Marseille	Aix-Marseille II (Mediterranean)
1973	Marseille	Aix-Marseille III (Paul Cézanne)
1973	Lyon	Lyon III (Jean Moulin)
1975/61	Corte	University of Corsica Pascal Paoli
1975	Mulhouse	Upper Alsace University
1976	Vandœuvre-lès-Nancy	National Polytechnic Institute of Lorraine
1976	Nantes	University of Nantes
1976	Valenciennes	University of Valenciennes and Hainaut-Cambresis
1978	Le Mans	University of Maine (France)
1978	Perpignan	University of Perpignan Via Domitia
1979	Chambéry	University of Savoy
1979	Toulon	University of the South, Toulon-Var
1984	Toulouse	National Polytechnic Institute of Toulouse
1991	Nantes	École centrale de Nantes
2009	Strasbourg	University of Strasbourg
2012	Marseille	Aix-Marseille University
2018	Lille	University of Lille

=== Georgia ===
Founded	City	University
1990	Tbilisi	Georgian Technical University
1991	Tbilisi	Georgian State Agrarian University
1992	Tbilisi	AIETI Medical School

=== Germany ===
Founded	City	University
1946	Mainz	Johannes Gutenberg University
1946	Berlin	Technische Universität Berlin
1947	Speyer	German University of Administrative Sciences
1948	Saarbrücken	Saarland University
1948	Berlin	Free University of Berlin
1948	Hamburg	Hochschule of Economics and Politics
1953	Ilmenau	Technical Hochschule
1962/5	Bochum	Ruhr University Bochum
1962/6	Regensburg	University of Regensburg
1962/8	Dortmund	University of Dortmund
1963/8	Hanover	Hannover Medical School
1965	Düsseldorf	University of Düsseldorf
1966	Konstanz	University of Konstanz
1967	Ulm	University of Ulm
1967	Hohenheim	University of Hohenheim
1967	Mannheim	University of Mannheim
1969	Bielefeld	Bielefeld University
1970	Augsburg	University of Augsburg
1970	Trier–Kaiserslautern	University of Trier and Kaiserslautern University of Technology
1970	Cologne	German Sport University Cologne
1971	Bremen	University of Bremen
1971	Kassel	University of Kassel
1972/5	Bayreuth	University of Bayreuth
1972/5	Bamberg	University of Bamberg
1972/5	Duisburg	Gerhard Mercator University
1972/5	Essen	University of Essen
1972/5	Hamburg	University of the German Federal Armed Forces Hamburg
1972/5	Paderborn	Paderborn University
1972/5	Siegen	University of Siegen
1972/5	Wuppertal	Bergische Universität Wuppertal
1973	Munich	University of the Bundeswehr Munich
1973	Oldenburg	Carl von Ossietzky University of Oldenburg
1973/4	Osnabrück	University of Osnabrück
1973/8	Passau	University of Passau
1973/8	Vechta	University of Vechta
1974	Hagen	FernUniversität Hagen
1978	Hamburg-Harburg	Hamburg University of Technology
1978	Hildesheim	University of Hildesheim
1980	Eichstätt	Catholic University of Eichstätt-Ingolstadt
1985	Lübeck	Graduate School for Computing in Medicine and Life Sciences
1986	Chemnitz	Chemnitz University of Technology
1989	Lüneburg	University of Lüneburg
1990	Koblenz–Landau	University of Koblenz and Landau
1991	Cottbus	Brandenburg Technical University
1991	Frankfurt (Oder)	Viadrina European University
1991	Potsdam	University of Potsdam
1993	Magdeburg	Otto von Guericke University
1994	Flensburg	University of Flensburg

=== Greece ===
Founded	City	University
1964	Patras	University of Patras
1970	Ioannina	University of Ioannina
1973	Komotini	Democritus University of Thrace
1973	Rethymno	University of Crete
1977	Chaniá	Technical University
1984	Corfu	Ionian University
1984	Mytilene	University of the Aegean
1984	Volos	University of Thessaly
1989	Piraeus	University of Piraeus
1989	Athens	Harokopia University
1989	Thessaloniki	University of Macedonia

=== Hungary ===
Founded	City	University
1949	Budapest	University of Veterinary Medicine
1949	Miskolc	Technical University of Heavy Industry
1951	Budapest	Semmelweis University
1951	Veszprém	University of Veszprém
1952	Gödöllő	University of Agriculture
1953	Budapest	University of Horticulture
1962	Sopron	University of Forestry
1970	Debrecen	University of Agriculture
1970	Keszthely	University of Agriculture
1971	Budapest	Moholy-Nagy University of Art and Design
1990	Budapest	Budapest University of Economics
1993	Budapest	Pázmány Péter Catholic University

=== Iceland ===
Founded	City	University
1971	Reykjavík	Iceland University of Education
1987	Akureyri	University of Akureyri
1989	Bifrost	School of Business

=== Ireland ===
Founded	City	University
1957	Dublin	Institute of Public Administration (Ireland)
1968	Dublin	Milltown Institute of Theology and Philosophy
1970	Athlone	Athlone Institute of Technology
1970	Carlow	Institute of Technology, Carlow
1971	Sligo	Institute of Technology, Sligo
1977	Tralee	Institute of Technology, Tralee
1978	Cork	Cork Institute of Technology
1989	Dublin	Dublin City University
1989	Limerick	University of Limerick
1992	Dublin	Dublin Institute of Technology
1992	Limerick	Limerick Institute of Technology

=== Italy ===
Founded	City	University
1967	Lecce	University of Lecce
1967	Reggio di Calabria	"Mediterranea" University of Reggio
1968	Arcavacata di Rende (Cosenza)	University of Calabria
1959	Ancona	Polytechnic University of the Marches
1977	Rome	Libera Università Internazionale degli Studi Sociali Guido Carli
1978	Udine	University of Udine
1979	Cassino	University of Cassino
1979	Viterbo	Tuscia University
1981	Potenza	University of Basilicata
1982	Rome	University of Rome Tor Vergata
1982	Brescia	University of Brescia
1982	Campobasso	University of Molise
1960	Chieti–Pescara	D'Annunzio University of Chieti–Pescara
1982	L'Aquila	University of L'Aquila
1982	Trento	University of Trento
1982	Verona	University of Verona
1987	Pisa	Sant'Anna School of Advanced Studies
1990	Bari	Polytechnic University of Bari
1990	Bergamo	University of Bergamo
1991	Castellanza	University Carlo Cattaneo
1991	Naples	Seconda Università degli Studi di Napoli
1991	Rome	Università Campus Bio-Medico
1992	Rome	University of Rome III
1993	Teramo	University of Teramo

=== Latvia ===
Founded	City	University
1954	Liepāja	Liepāja Academy of Pedagogy
1990	Riga	Latvian Academy of Culture
1991	Jelgava	Latvian University of Agriculture
1999	Riga	Transport and Telecommunication Institute

=== Liechtenstein ===
Founded	City	University
1961	Vaduz	University of Liechtenstein

=== Lithuania ===
Founded	City	University
1945	Kaunas	Lithuanian National Institute of Physical Education
1950	Kaunas	Kaunas Medical Institute
1950	Kaunas	Polytechnic Institute
1991	Klaipėda	University of Klaipėda
1994	Vilnius	Vilnius Gediminas Technical University

=== Luxembourg ===
Founded	City	University
2003	Luxembourg	University of Luxembourg

=== Northern Macedonia ===
Founded	City	University
1949	Skopje	Ss. Cyril and Methodius University of Skopje
1979	Bitola	St. Clement of Ohrid University of Bitola

=== Moldavia ===
Founded	City	University
1992	Chişinău	Free International University of Moldavia
1993	Chişinău	Technical University of Moldova

=== Montenegro ===
Founded	City	University
1973	Podgorica	University of Montenegro

=== Netherlands ===
Founded	City	University
1946	Breukelen	Nyenrode Business Universiteit
1956	Eindhoven	Eindhoven University of Technology
1961	Enschede	University of Twente
1975	Maastricht	Maastricht University
1982/4	Heerlen	Open University (Netherlands)
1989	Utrecht	University of Humanistic Studies

=== Norway ===
Founded	City	University
1946	Bergen	University of Bergen
1968/72	Tromsø	University of Tromsø
1996	Trondheim	Norwegian University of Science and Technology

=== Poland ===
Founded	City	University
1944/5	Lublin	Maria Curie-Sklodowska University
1945/6	Łódź	University of Łódź
1946	Toruń	Nicolaus Copernicus University in Toruń
1968	Katowice	Silesian University
1970	Gdańsk	University of Gdańsk
1984/5	Szczecin	University of Szczecin
1994	Opole	Opole University
2001	Rzeszów	University of Rzeszów

=== Portugal ===
Founded	City	University
1973	Lisbon	Nova University Lisbon
1973	Aveiro	University of Aveiro
1973	Braga	University of Minho
1979	Évora	University of Évora
1979	Covilhã	University of Beira Interior
1979	Faro	University of the Algarve
1986	Vila Real	University of Trás-os-Montes and Alto Douro

=== Romania ===
Founded	City	University
1948	Timișoara	Banat University of Agricultural Sciences and Veterinary Medicine
1962	Timișoara	West University of Timișoara
1965	Bucharest	Politehnica University of Bucharest
1947	Craiova	University of Craiova
1971	Brașov	Transylvania University of Brașov
1974	Galați	University 'Dunarea de Jos' din Galați
1989	Bucharest	Carol Davila University of Medicine and Pharmacy
1991	Petrosani	Technical University
1992	Bucharest	National Academy of Physical Education and Sport
1992	Iași	Grigore T. Popa University of Medicine and Pharmacy
1992	Cluj-Napoca	Technical University of Cluj-Napoca
1994	Bucharest	Technical University of Civil Engineering of Bucharest

=== Russia ===
The following list also includes Russian universities in the Asian part of the country.

Founded	City	University
1951	Moscow	Russian State Open Technical University of Railway Communication
1957	Ufa	Bashkir State University
1957	Mahachkala	Dagestan State University
1957	Nalchik	Kabardino-Balkarian State University
1957	Saransk	Mordovian State University
1958	Vladimir	Vladimir State University
1959	Moscow	Peoples' Friendship University of Russia
1959	Briansk	Briansk State Engineering Academy
1967	Cheboksary	Chuvash State University
1969	Krasnoyarsk	Krasnoyarsk State University
1969	Vladikavkaz	North Ossetian State University
1970	Belgorod	Belgorod State Technical University
1970	Krasnodar	Kuban State University
1972	Kemerovo	Kemerovo Technological Institute of Food Industry
1972	Yoshkar-Ola	Mari State University
1973	Barnaul	Altai State University
1973	Krasnodar	Kuban State University of Technology
1973	Tyumen	Tyumen State University
1974	Ivanovo	Ivanovo State University
1974	Kemerovo	Kemerovo State University
1974	Omsk	Omsk State University
1974	Izhevsk	Udmurt State University
1976	Chelyabinsk	Chelyabinsk State University
1980	Volgograd	Volgograd State University
1981	Novosibirsk	Siberian State University of Telecommunications and Informatics
1982	Krasnoyarsk	Krasnoyarsk State Academy of Architecture and Civil Engineering
1984	Ryazan	Ryazan State Pedagogical University
1988	Moscow	Moscow Institute of Physics and Technology
1989	Moscow	Moscow State Pedagogical University
1989	Samara	Samara State University
1989	Moscow	Moscow Medical Academy
1990	Krasnoyarsk	Krasnoyarsk State Technical University
1991	Saint Petersburg	Herzen State Pedagogical University
1991	Moscow	International Independent Ecological and Political University
1991	Moscow	International University in Moscow
1991	Moscow	Moscow State Social University
1991	Moscow	Russian Law Academy
1991	Novosibirsk	Novosibirsk State Agrarian University
1991	Saint Petersburg	Saint Petersburg State Agrarian University
1991	Saint Petersburg	St. Petersburg State Mining Institute
1991	Tomsk	Tomsk Polytechnic University
1992	Moscow	International Institute of Marketing and Management
1992	Moscow	Moscow Power Engineering Institute
1992	Moscow	Moscow State Automobile and Highway Engineering Institute
1992	Moscow	Moscow Technical University of Communication and Informatics
1992	Moscow	Russian State Academy of Physical Education
1992	Novosibirsk	Novosibirsk State Technical University
1992	Saint Petersburg	Saint Petersburg State Electrotechnical University
1992	Samara	Samara State Aerospace University
1992	Saratov	Saratov State Technical University
1992	Tomsk	Siberian State Medical University
1992	Tula	Tula State Technical University
1992	Ekaterinburg	Ural State Academy of Law
1992	Volgograd	Volgograd State Pedagogical University
1992	Ivanovo	Ivanovo State University of Power Engineering
1992	Izhevsk	Izhevsk State Technical University
1993	Irkutsk	Irkutsk State Technical University
1992	Kursk	Kursk State Medical University
1992	Maykop	Maykop State Technological Institute
1993	Moscow	Moscow State University of Forestry Engineering
1993	Moscow	Moscow State Academy of Law
1993	Moscow	Moscow State Institute of Electronics and Mathematics
1993	Moscow	Moscow State University of Railway Engineering
1993	Omsk	Omsk State Pedagogical University
1993	Ryazan	Ryazan State Radio Engineering Academy
1993	Rostov-on-Don	Rostov State Pedagogical University
1993	Samara	Samara State Medical University
1993	Tambov	Tambov State Technical University
1993	Volgograd	Volgograd State University of Medicine
1994	Ekaterinburg	Ural State Academy of Mining and Geology
1994	Krasnoyarsk	Krasnoyarsk State Medical Academy
1994	Rybinsk	Rybinsk State Academy of Aviation Technology
1994	Saint Petersburg	Saint Petersburg State Medical Academy
1994	Stavropol	Stavropol State Medical Academy
1994	Tambov	Tambov State University
1994	Ufa	Ufa State Petroleum Technological University
1994	Ulyanovsk	Ulyanovsk State Technical University
1994	Kirov	Vyatka State University
1994	Voronezh	Voronezh State Academy of Forestry Engineering
1994	Voronezh	Voronezh State Academy of Technology
1994	Voronezh	Voronezh State Medical Academy
1995	Groznyj	Chechen State University
1995	Kirov	Vyatka State Humanitarian University
1995	Kostroma	University of Technology
1995	Kurgan	Kurgan State University
1995	Yoshkar-Ola	Mari State Technical University
1995	Ussuriysk	Primorsky State Academy of Agriculture
1995	Ulan-Ude	Buryat State Academy of Agriculture
1995	Ulan-Ude	Buryat State University
1995	Moscow	Moscow City University
1999	Moscow	Academy of Management of the Ministry of Internal Affairs of Russia

=== Serbia ===
Founded	City	University
1960	Novi Sad	University of Novi Sad
1965	Niš	University of Niš
1970	Pristina	University of Pristina
1973	Belgrade	University of Arts in Belgrade
1977	Kragujevac	University of Kragujevac
2006	Novi Pazar	State University of Novi Pazar

=== Slovakia ===
Founded	City	University
1949	Bratislava	Academy of Fine Arts and Design in Bratislava
1949	Bratislava	Academy of Performing Arts in Bratislava
1949	Košice	University of Veterinary Medicine in Košice
1952	Nitra	Slovak University of Agriculture
1952	Trnava	University of Trnava
1952	Zvolen	University of Technology in Zvolen
1952	Košice	Technical University of Košice
1953	Žilina	University of Žilina
1959	Košice	Pavol Jozef Safarik University
1973	Liptovský Mikuláš	General Milan Rastislav Štefánik Armed Forces Academy
1990	Trenčín	City University of Seattle (Vysoká Škola Manažmentu)
1992	Bratislava	Police Academy in Bratislava
1992	Banská Bystrica	Matej Bel University
1992	Trenčín	Alexander Dubček University of Trenčín

=== Slovenia ===
Founded	City	University
1975	Maribor	University of Maribor

=== Spain ===
Founded	City	University
1945	El Escorial	Royal College of Higher Education Maria Cristina
1960	Madrid	Comillas Pontifical University
1962	Pamplona	University of Navarre
1963	Bilbao	University of Deusto
1968	Barcelona	Autonomous University of Barcelona
1968/1980	Bilbao	University of the Basque Country
1968	Badajoz	University of Extremadura
1968	Madrid	Autonomous University of Madrid
1971	Madrid	Technical University of Madrid
1972	Córdoba	University of Córdoba
1971	Madrid	National University of Distance Education
1971	Málaga	University of Málaga
1971	Santander	University of Cantabria
1971	Valencia	Polytechnic University of Valencia
1973	Barcelona	Polytechnic University of Catalonia
1977	Alcalá de Henares	University of Alcalá
1978	Alicante	University of Alicante
1978	Palma de Mallorca	University of the Balearic Islands
1979	Cádiz	University of Cádiz
1979	Las Palmas	Polytechnic of the Canary Islands
1979	León	University of León
1982	Ciudad Real	University of Castile-La Mancha
1987	Pamplona	Universidad Pública de Navarra
1989	Madrid	Charles III University of Madrid
1989	Vigo	University of Vigo
1989	A Coruña	University of A Coruña
1990	Barcelona	Pompeu Fabra University
1991	Barcelona	Ramon Llull University
1991	Castelló de la Plana	James I University
1992	Lleida	University of Lleida
1992	Tarragona	Rovira i Virgili University
1993	Jaén	University of Jaén
1993	Madrid	CEU San Pablo University
1994	Seville	International University of Andalusia
1995	Madrid	University San Antonio de Nebrija
1995	Madrid	European University of Madrid

=== Sweden ===
Founded	City	University
1954	Gothenburg	University of Gothenburg
1960	Stockholm	Stockholm University
1965	Umeå	Umeå University
1973	Linköping	Linköping University
1999	Örebro	Örebro University

=== Turkey ===
The campuses of the universities of Istanbul may be located on both sides of the Bosporus.

Founded	City	University
1955	Istanbul	Boğaziçi University
1982	Istanbul	Marmara University
1982	Istanbul	Mimar Sinan Fine Arts University
1982	Edirne	Trakya University
1982	Istanbul	Yıldız Technical University
1992	Istanbul	Koç University
1993	Istanbul	Galatasaray University

=== Ukraine ===
Many of universities listed here are founded after Ukraine independence in 1991. Often those universities have much longer history, as they are created on the base of already existed institutes as a result of reforms.

Founded	City	University
1946	Kyiv	Kyiv National University of Trade and Economics
1954	Kharkiv	Kharkiv Institute of Fire Safety
1965	Donetsk	Donetsk National University
1989	Kyiv	Interregional Academy of Personnel Management
1992	Donetsk	Donetsk State University of Management
1993	Donetsk	Donetsk Technical University
1993	Dnipro	Ukrainian State Chemical Technology University
1993	Kharkiv	Kharkiv National University of Radioelectronics
1993	Odesa	Odesa State Polytechnic University
1993	Ivano-Frankivsk	Precarpathian 'Vasyl Stefanyk' University Ivano-Frankivsk
1994	Kramatorsk	Donbas State Mechanical Engineering Academy
1994	Kharkiv	Kharkiv State Technical University of Construction and Architecture
1994	Khmelnitsky	Khmelnitsky State University
1994	Kyiv	Kyiv National Linguistic University
1994	Kyiv	National Agricultural University of Ukraine
1994	Kharkiv	National Technical University
1994	Odesa	Odesa State Maritime University
1994	Odesa	Odesa State Medical University
1994	Vinnytsia	Vinnytsia State 'M.I. Pyrogov' Memorial Medical University
1995	Kyiv	National Technical University of Ukraine 'Kyiv Polytechnic Institute'

=== United Kingdom ===
Founded	City	University
1948	Nottingham	University of Nottingham
1957	Leicester	University of Leicester
1961	Brighton	University of Sussex
1961	Colchester	University of Essex
1962	Keele	Keele University
1963	Newcastle-upon-Tyne	University of Newcastle-upon-Tyne
1963	York	University of York
1964	Canterbury	University of Kent
1964	Hull	University of Hull
1964	Lancaster	Lancaster University
1964	Norwich	University of East Anglia
1964	Exeter	University of Exeter
1964	Coventry	University of Warwick
1966	Bath	University of Technology
1966	Bradford	University of Bradford
1966	Guildford	University of Surrey
1966	Loughborough	Loughborough University
1966	Uxbridge	Brunel University
1966	Edinburgh	Heriot-Watt University
1967	Salford	University of Salford
1967	Stirling	University of Stirling
1967	Dundee	University of Dundee
1969	Milton Keynes	Open University
1982	Bolton	Bolton Institute of Higher Education
1983	Buckingham	University of Buckingham
1983	Southampton	Southampton Institute
1990	Edinburgh	Scottish Agricultural College
1992	Chelmsford	Anglia Polytechnic University
1992	Poole	Bournemouth University
1992	Coventry	Coventry University
1992	Kingston-upon-Thames	Kingston University
1992	Leeds	Leeds Metropolitan University
1992	Liverpool	Liverpool John Moores University
1992	London	Middlesex University
1992	Edinburgh	Napier University
1992	Newcastle-upon-Tyne	Northumbria University
1992	Oxford	Oxford Brookes University
1992	Sheffield	Sheffield Hallam University
1992	London	South Bank University
1992	Stoke-on-Trent	Staffordshire University
1992	Manchester	Manchester Metropolitan University
1992	Huddersfield	University of Huddersfield
1992	Wolverhampton	University of Wolverhampton
1992	Birmingham	University of Central England in Birmingham
1992	Preston	University of Central Lancashire
1992	London	University of East London
1993	Cranfield	Cranfield University
1993	Glasgow	Glasgow Caledonian University

== See also ==
- History of European research universities

== Sources ==
- Rüegg, Walter: "Appendix: Universities Founded in Europe Between 1945 and 1995", in: Rüegg, Walter (ed.): A History of the University in Europe. Vol. IV: Universities Since 1945, Cambridge University Press, 2011, ISBN 978-0-521-36108-8, pp. 575–594
