= Zoltán Pogátsa =

Hungarian political economist

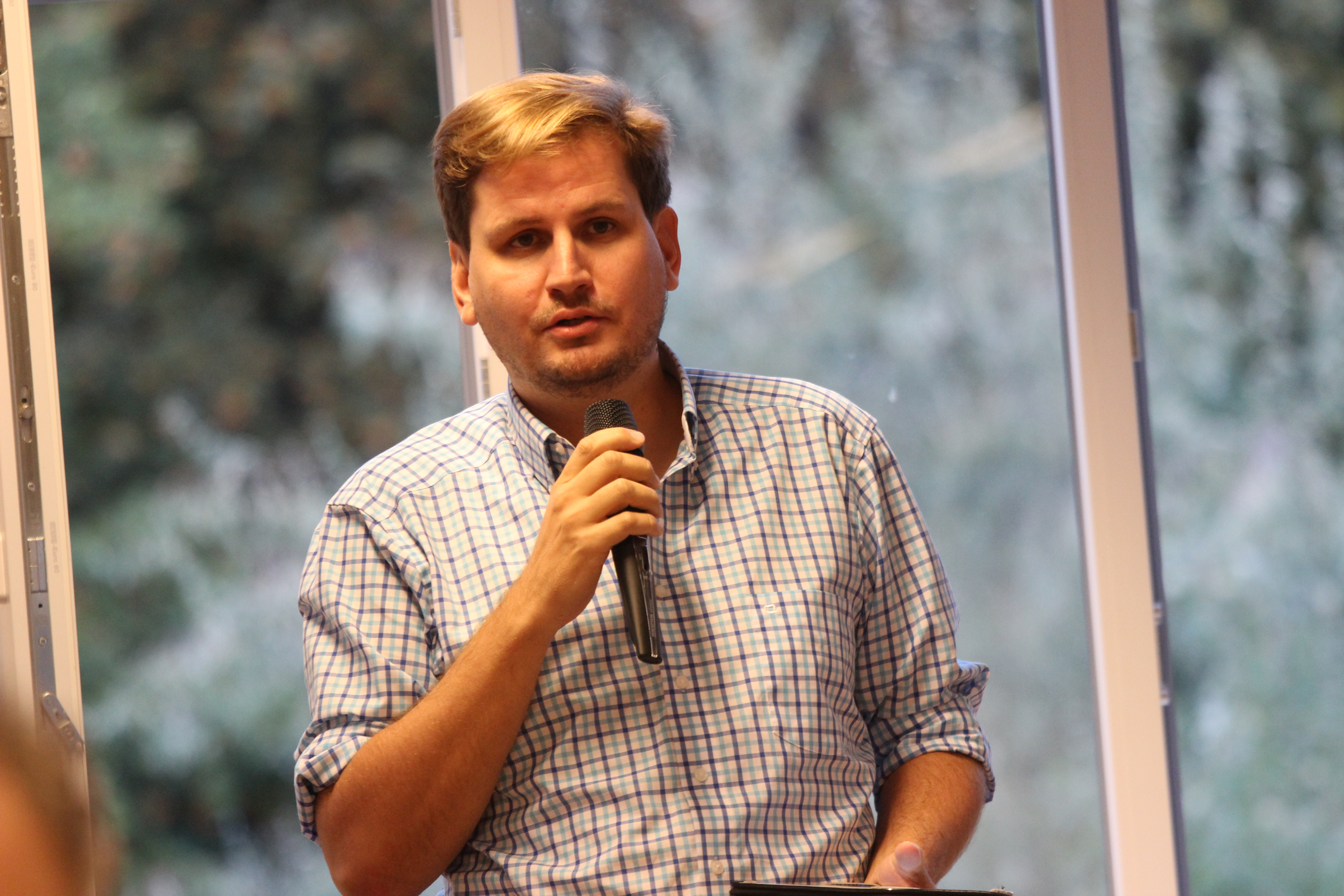
Zoltan Pogatsa at a lecture in 2013

Zoltán Pogátsa (Hungarian: [ˈzoltaːn ˈpoɡaːt͡ʃɒ]; born 1974) is a Hungarian political economist, and lecturer at the University of West Hungary, focusing on the economics of European integration. He has published six books and numerous professional and media articles, and is a regular commentator in Hungarian and international media on issues related to European integration and economic development. His book Heterodox International Political Economics offers perspectives on understanding the global economy of the 21st century.

== Early life ==
Due to his engineer father's work, Pogátsa lived a dual-country childhood, spending time in Kuwait and Hungary.

Between 1985 and 1992, he attended the New English School Kuwait and József Attila Secondary School in Budapest.

During the Gulf War, he was in Hungary, while his father disappeared for three weeks and was believed for a long time to have died. Eventually, his father managed to return to his family via Amman.

== Education ==
Pogátsa pursued his higher education at Eötvös Loránd University, studying sociology, and obtained his degree in 1999 with a specialisation in research.

In 1997–98, he studied political science and international relations at the University of Westminster in London on a TEMPUS scholarship. He studied at Central European University between 1999 and 2000, completing an MA programme. Between 2001 and 2003, he completed an MBA programme at the Budapest University of Technology and Economics, specialising in economics and finance.

He obtained his doctoral degree from the University of Sussex in 2004, which was recognised by the Corvinus University of Budapest.

== Work ==
From 1999, Pogátsa worked as a lecturer and researcher, and later as an associate professor, at University of West Hungary. At the same time, between 2000 and 2005, he was an assistant lecturer and researcher at the Budapest University of Technology and Economics.

He is an associate professor at the University of Sopron. He is also the programme director there. He regularly gives lectures at the universities of Verona, Leipzig and Leeuwarden.

From 2005 to 2015, he was a member of the Hungarian Academy of Sciences. His research area was European integration, with particular attention to the countries of the periphery.

Pogátsa is a regular guest on Hungarian television debate programmes and podcasts. In 2021, he launched his own show, Pogi Podcast. Since 2020, he has also been a speaker for Tudományos Stand Up, an organisation that produces science communication events.

In 2013 he spent a year on a Greek government research grant in Athens. He summarised his inquiries into the Greek crisis in a book entitled The Political Economy of the Greek Crisis.
