= Education in Bosnia and Herzegovina =

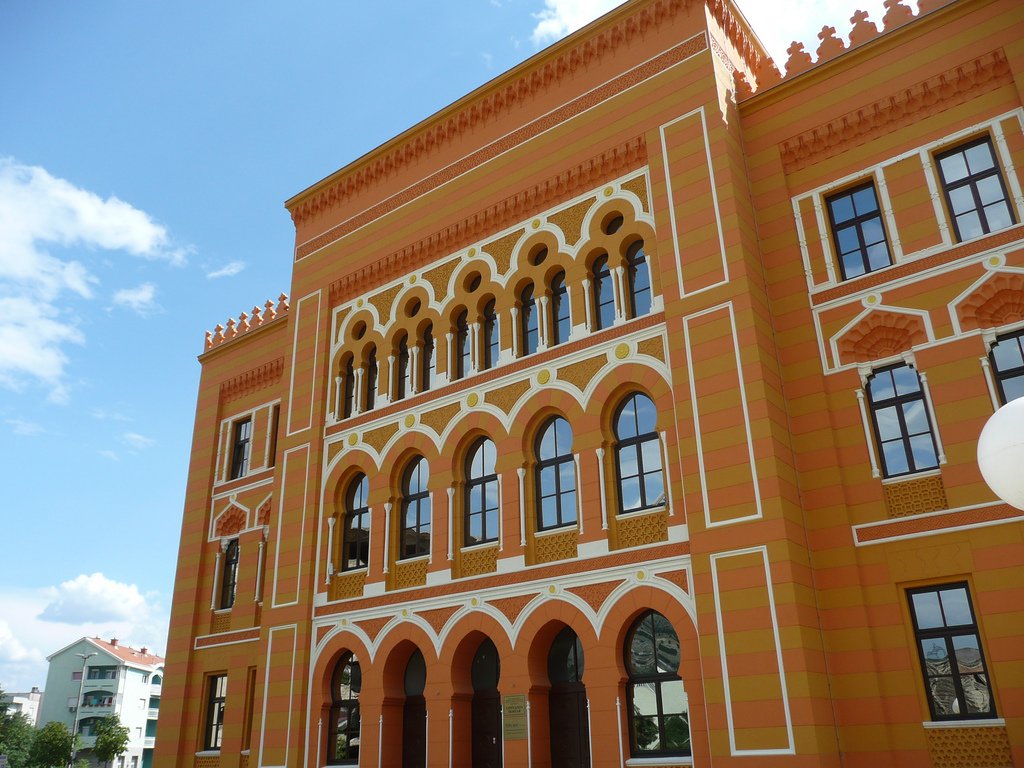
Gimnazija Mostar in Mostar was one of the most academically prestigious educational institutions in Yugoslavia.

Education in Bosnia and Herzegovina has a long history, the first classifiable higher-education institution having been established a school of Sufi philosophy by Gazi Husrev-beg in 1531, with numerous other religious schools following suit over time. In 1887, under de facto Austro-Hungarian Empire control, a Sharia Law School began a five-year program. In the 1940s the University of Sarajevo became the city's first secular higher education institute. In the 1950s post-bachelaurate graduate degrees became available.

Severely damaged during the war, it was recently rebuilt in partnership with more than 40 other universities. There are various other institutions of higher education, including: University of Banja Luka, University of Mostar, University of Tuzla, University of Zenica, University of East Sarajevo, University Džemal Bijedić of Mostar, University of Bihać, American University in Bosnia and Herzegovina, etc.

The education system is made of up of three levels:

- Primary school
- Secondary levels
- University education

== Primary education ==
Primary education in Bosnia and Herzegovina is compulsory and free for all children from ages 6 through 15 and lasts for nine years in three three-year cycles (ages 6–9; 9–12 and 12–15). This system was first adopted in 2004, as a replacement for the old eight-year primary education system, offered to children from ages 6 through 14 in two four-year cycles (ages 6–10 and 10–14), which was however still valid for children who began education before 2004 and also in some regions after that date.

== Secondary education ==
Secondary education in Bosnia and Herzegovina is also free. It is provided by general and technical secondary schools, where studies begin at the age of 15 (or 14, as part of the old education system) and last for three or four years. Most children in Bosnia start school when they are six years old and finish high school when they are eighteen or nineteen. Students who have graduated from general secondary schools (Gimnazija) get the Matura and opt to enroll in any faculty or college after passing a qualification examination given by the institution while students who graduated from technical schools get a diploma.

== Tertiary education ==
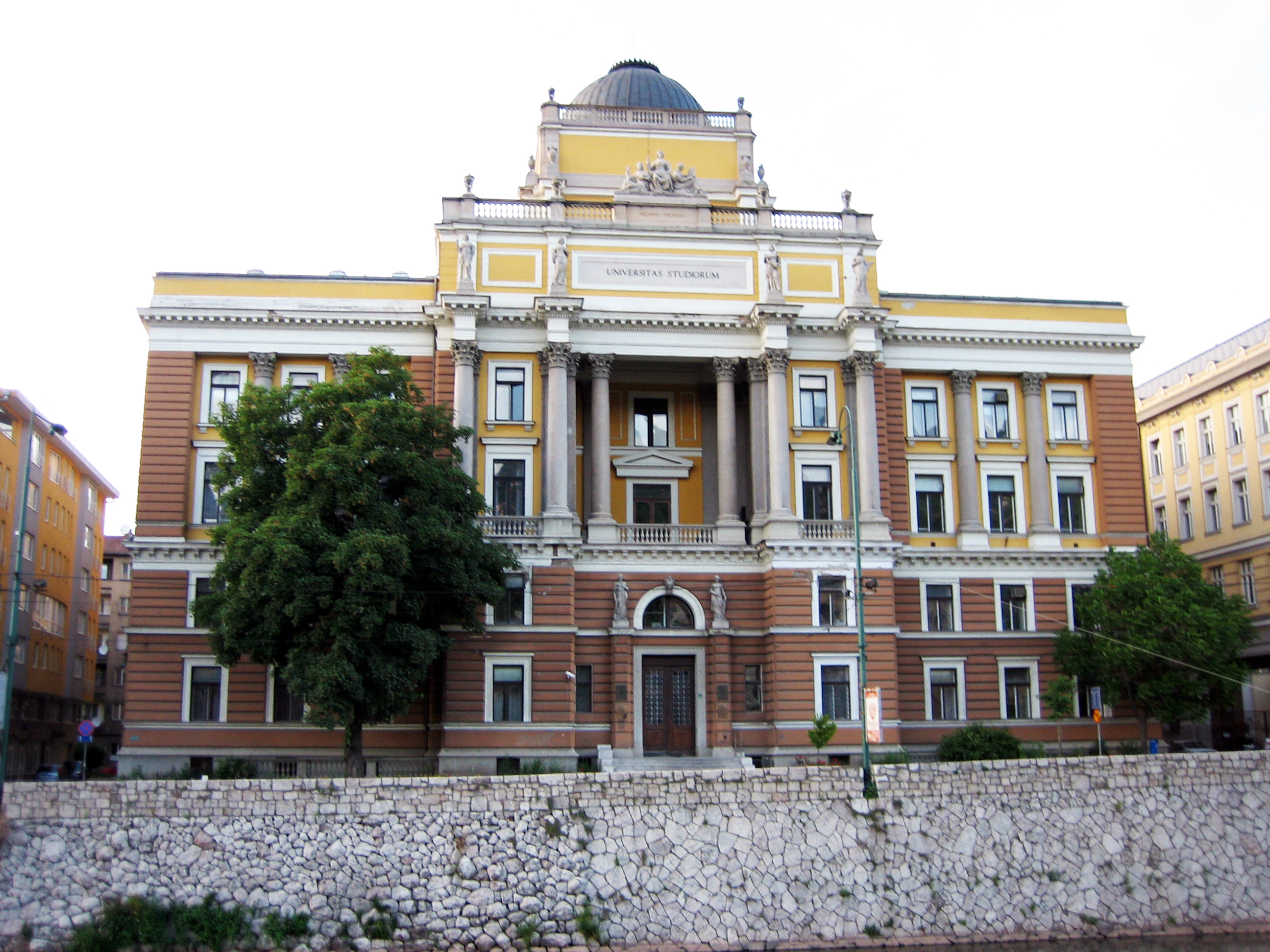
The University of Sarajevo rector's office building.

Bosnia Herzegovina's higher education system comprises eight universities (University of Sarajevo, University of Tuzla, University of Mostar, University of Banja Luka, University Džemal Bijedić of Mostar, University of East Sarajevo, University of Bihać, and the University of Zenica) with some 90 faculties, which are treated as higher education establishments, and art academies. University degrees are acquired at the faculties and arts academies. There are 37 private higher education institutions and the law on higher education (passed in July 2007) treats private and public higher education institutions equally.

Under the new law, university education is organized according to the system of transferable points and has three levels:

- The undergraduate courses typically last for three to four years and bring 180 to 240 ECTS points. Upon the completion of the undergraduate courses, students are awarded the title of Bachelor of Arts or Science.
- Postgraduate courses, which last for two years, carry 120 ECTS points and award the degree of Master of Art or Science.
- PhD courses can be taken after completing a postgraduate university course. They typically last three years, and the academic title of Doctor of Science or Doctor of Arts is awarded upon completion.

The university can also offer postgraduate specialist courses which last for one to two years, by which one can acquire the title of a specialist in a certain specialist field such as medicine.

In accordance with laws and regulations, higher education institutions are funded by the corresponding RS or FBiH authorities. Higher education activities are thus governed by either RS or FBiH legislation, with the state level Ministry of Civil Affairs assuming the task of coordinating the higher education activities of the two entities.

One of the main prerequisites for reform was the adoption of the higher education law in Bosnia and Herzegovina. Following its adoption, many challenges such as the establishment of ENIC institutions and a financing council will need to be addressed. Reforms within universities themselves will represent a challenge — for example, the introduction and implementation of the ECTS and diploma supplements, as well as other Bologna process initiatives.

== See also ==
- Two schools under one roof
- Academic grading in Bosnia and Herzegovina
