= List of split up universities =

This is a list of universities which were split into more than one new institution. Over the history numerous higher education institutions were split up or some scholars left already established institutions and established new ones. Some of the oldest medieval universities were established when students or faculty moved en masse from one town to another. Many of those splits were rampant, motivated by ideological, political or identity concerns. Among others, they include politically motivated mass breakup of French universities in the aftermath of protests of 1968 when in 1971 the total of fifteen universities was split up into 56 new ones or linguistic and communitarian breakup of Belgian universities.

Following the split up, new institutions may either all be new independent legal entities, one may legally continue earlier institution in some capacity, or the rump institution may stay in place without seceded units. Some initiatives to split up universities were faced with protests or questions on the viability of new institutions.

== Africa ==
=== Botswana ===
- University of Botswana, Lesotho and Swaziland, divided into University of Botswana and Swaziland and University of Lesotho. University of Botswana and Swaziland was subsequently divided into University of Botswana and University of Swaziland.

=== Libya ===
- University of Libya divided in 1973 into the University of Tripoli and University of Benghazi.

=== Madagascar ===
- University of Madagascar divided in 1988 into independent new institutions.

=== Mali ===
- University of Bamako, divided in 2011 into 4 independent institutions.

=== South Africa ===
- University of South Africa was the degree-granting institution for a number of constituent colleges in South Africa. From 1946 onward, the constituent colleges became separate autonomous universities, and the University of South Africa became a distance education institution.

== Asia ==
=== Georgia ===
- Abkhazian State University and Sukhumi State University.

=== Laos ===
- Sisavangvong University was divided into separate colleges.

=== Sri Lanka ===
- University of Ceylon was separated into four independent universities in 1978.

== Europe ==
=== Belgium ===
- New University of Brussels split up as an independent institution from the Free University of Brussels in 1894, after the anarchist geographer Élisée Reclus was prevented from teaching for political reasons. In 1919, it was decided to re-merge the institution with the Free University of Brussels.
- Université catholique de Louvain and Katholieke Universiteit Leuven created as independent French and Dutch institutions in 1969 out of the Catholic University of Leuven, following the Leuven crisis.
- Université libre de Bruxelles and Vrije Universiteit Brussel created as independent French and Dutch institutions in 1969 out of the Free University of Brussels.
- Universitaire Faculteiten Sint-Aloysius split up as an independent Dutch-speaking institution from the (originally and now French-speaking) Saint-Louis University, Brussels in 1969.

=== Bosnia and Herzegovina ===
- University of East Sarajevo, initially named the University of Sarajevo in Republika Srpska, split up from the University of Sarajevo in 1992 during the Bosnian War.
- University of Mostar, formed at the time of the Bosnian War by illegally occupying buildings and equipment from University Džemal Bijedić of Mostar. University Džemal Bijedić of Mostar was then forced to reorganize in the part of Mostar that was under control of Bosnian Army.

=== Croatia ===
- University of Slavonski Brod created out of the Slavonski Brod based faculties of the University of Osijek and the local polytechnic.

=== France ===
- University of Paris, (est. 1150) following the protests of 1968, the institution was divided into 13 new universities in 1970.
- University of Montpellier, (est. 1220) was divided into 3 new universities in 1969 : University of Montpellier 1, the University of Montpellier 2 and the Paul Valéry University Montpellier 3, reunited in 2015.
- University of Toulouse (est. 1229) divided into 3 new universities in 1969 : University Toulouse-I-Capitole, University Toulouse-Jean-Jaurès and Toulouse-III-Paul-Sabatier University.
- University of Rennes (est. 1460) was divided into the University of Rennes 1 and University of Upper Brittany (now Rennes 2 University) in 1969, reunited in 2023.
- The University of Strasbourg (est. 1538) was divided in 1971 into the Louis Pasteur University (Strasbourg 1), Marc Bloch University (Strasbourg 2), and Robert Schuman University (Strasbourg 3). The three were later rejoined in 2009.
- University of Clermont-Ferrand (est. 1896) divided in 1976 between the University of Auvergne and Blaise Pascal University, reunited in 2017.
- University of Lyon (est. 1896) divided into 3 new universities in 1969 : Claude Bernard University (Lyon 1), Lumière University (Lyon 2) and Jean Moulin University (Lyon 3).
- The École Normale Supérieure de Rennes gained independence from the then École Normale Supérieure de Cachan in 2013.

=== Germany ===
- The Free University of Berlin was created by West Berlin scholars of the Humboldt University of Berlin following WWII with Humboldt University remaining under Soviet leadership, and Free University falling under Western leadership. Both universities share the title of successor to the original University of Berlin.
- The University of Leipzig was established in 1409 by former students and faculty from Charles University, who left due to the events surrounding the Decree of Kutna Hora.

=== Ireland ===
- Royal University of Ireland divided into the National University of Ireland and Queen's University Belfast in 1909.

=== Italy ===
- University of Padua was established in 1222 by a secession of about a thousand students who left the University of Bologna.

=== Kosovo ===
- University of Priština and University of Pristina created out of the University of Pristina (1969–99).

=== Moldova ===
- Taras Shevchenko State University of Tiraspol divided into the Transnistrian State University, still located at Tiraspol, and the Tiraspol State University, now located in Chișinău, as a result of the Transnistria War.

=== United Kingdom ===
- University of Cambridge was established by scholars who left the University of Oxford.
- University of Dundee gained independent status from the University of St Andrews in 1967.
- Victoria University was disestablished after the University of Liverpool split up in 1903, the University of Leeds in 1904 and the new charter was granted to the Victoria University of Manchester.
- Imperial College London gained independent status from the University of London in 2007.
- Easton & Otley College split up in 2020.

== North America ==
=== United States ===
- The New School, established in 1919 by progressive New York educators, largely former Columbia University faculty that objected to a mandatory loyalty oath.

== Oceania ==
=== New Zealand ===
- University of New Zealand was dissolved in 1962 when former constituent colleges were granted degree-conferring powers.

== See also ==
- Lists of universities and colleges
- 1229 University of Paris strike
- Two schools under one roof
