= FMOD (disambiguation) =

FMOD is a proprietary sound effects engine and authoring tool for video games and applications.

FMOD may also refer to:

- FMOD (gene), a human gene that encodes the protein fibromodulin
- fmod, a function in computer programming languages, in Modulo#In programming languages
- Fakultet međunarodnih odnosa i diplomacije ("Faculty of International Relations and Diplomacy") at the University of Herzegovina
- Financial Markets Operations Department of the Monetary Policy Committee of India
