= Faculty of Economics Brčko =

Faculty of Economics University of Istočno Sarajevo
- Економски факултет Брчко; Ekonomski fakultet Brčko
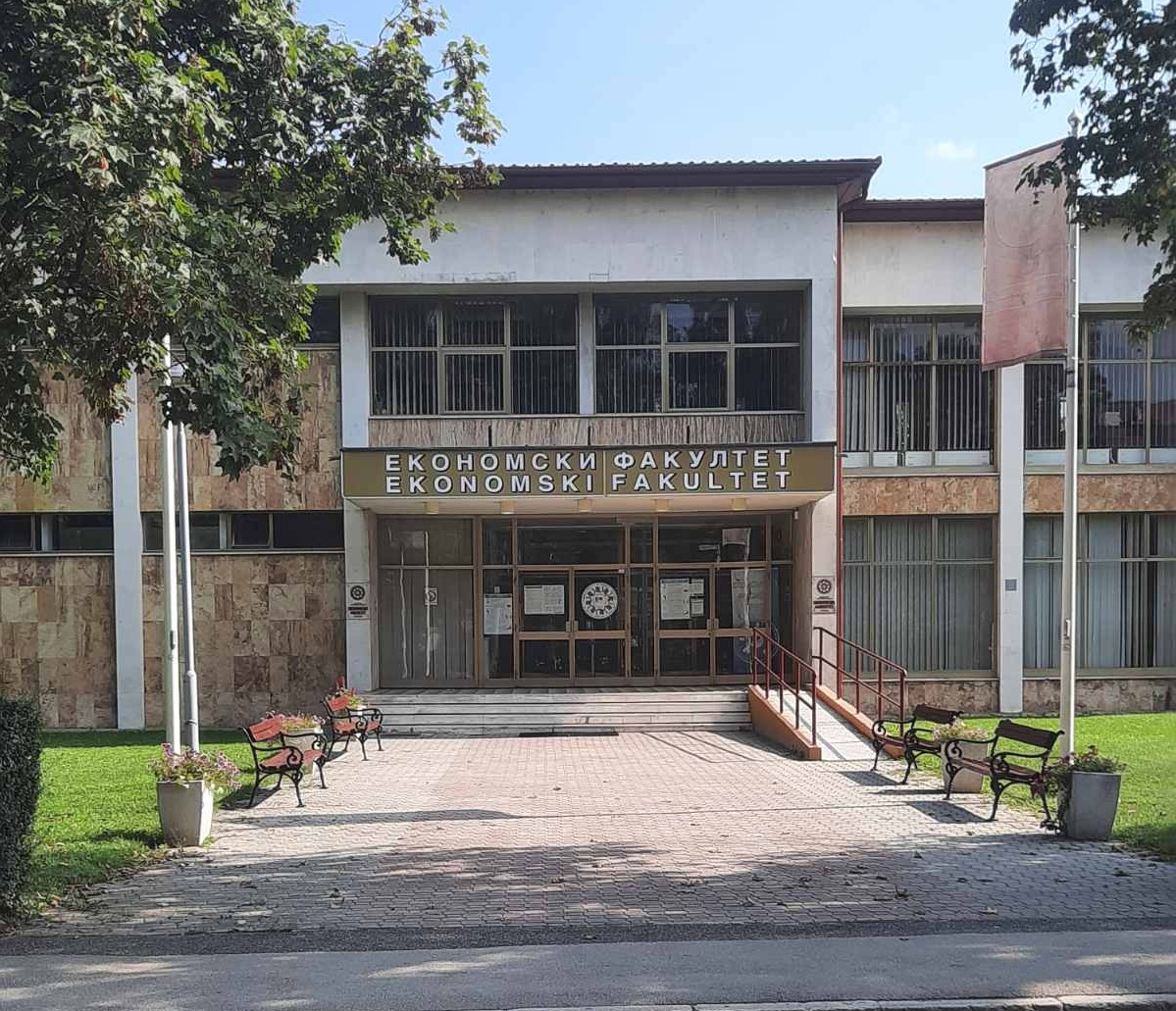
- Type: Public
- Established: 1976
- Location: Brčko, Bosnia and Herzegovina; 44.869444°N 18.807500°E
- Website: www.efb.ues.rs.ba

Faculty of Economics Brčko (EFB) is one of the educational institutions of the University od Istočno Sarajevo.

== Study programs ==
The study at the Faculty of Economics Brčko is organized through an Economics study program, with two cycles of study:

- First cycle of studies, 8 terms, 240 ECTS credits,
- Second cycle of studies, 2 terms, 60 ECST credits.

260 students of the first cycle and 60 students of the second cycle of studies are currently studying at the Faculty of Economics Brčko. Since the founding of the Faculty, 2357 students have obtained Bachelor of Economics title.

Faculty of Economics Brčko holds ADHEQA — Agency for Development of Higher Education and Quality Assurance accreditation.

== History ==
By the decision of the Municipal Assembly of Brčko, on 23 September 1976, the Faculty of Economics was established. After its founding, the Faculty belonged first to the University of Sarajevo, then to the University of Tuzla, and since 1992 it has been part of the University of Istočno Sarajevo. Initially, a four-year study was organized in the field of Business Process Management, and since 2000, three fields of study have been introduced: Management, Accounting and Finance and Business Informatics. Since 2004, postgraduate studies have been organized in two programs: Management in Accounting and Auditing and Management and Entrepreneurship. With academic year 2011/2012, the second cycle of studies (master studies) has started with 3 study programs: Economic Planning and Development, Management and Marketing and Financial and Banking Management.

In recent years, teachers and associates of the Faculty have published over fifty book titles and monographs in the field of economics, management, informatics, statistics, accounting, business finance and related fields. Scientific works of teachers and associates and journals are regularly published at the Faculty. A large number of scientific and professional projects, studies, reports and investment programs have been made, which have significantly improved the development of the economy and social activities of the wider area and Bosnia and Herzegovina as a whole.

== Faculty organization ==
The Faculty employs 11 full-time teachers and 4 associates, with 5 teachers and 2 associates who are permanently employed at the faculties of the University of East Sarajevo, as well as 5 part-time teachers who are engaged in the teaching process. There are 14 employees in the administration and technical affairs. The Faculty has a library with a reading room, IT room, English language lab and the Center for Scientific Research, with modern computers and other equipment. In addition to scientific and teaching activities, the Faculty of Economics in Brčko has signed agreements on cooperation with partner institutions from the country and abroad with the objective of exchanging experiences and knowledge, student mobility, student internships, etc. Some of these partner institutions are: Zhejiang Wanli University Business School (Ningbo, China); Universitas Indonesia (Indonesia); National Bank of Serbia (Belgrade, Republic of Serbia); Communications Regulatory Agency of Bosnia and Herzegovina (Sarajevo, Bosnia and Herzegovina); Brcko District of Bosnia and Herzegovina – Mayor's Office.

== Educational activity ==
Study program Economics at the Faculty of Economics in Brčko is organized in two cycles:

- the First cycle – Basic studies and
- the Second cycle – Master studies.

The First cycle (Basic Studies – 240 ECTS credits) is a four-year study, and a Bachelor of Economics title is obtained after. There are two majors in the First cycle of studies: Accounting and Finance and Management. The first and second years of undergraduate studies, the students take lessons and have exams in joint subjects, and after enrollment in the third year of study, they can opt for one of two majors. The Second cycle (Master study – 60 ECTS credits) is a one-year study, and the title of Master of Economics is obtained after. The Master's study includes two study programs: Management and Marketing and Financial and Banking Management. Candidates who have completed the Basic studies in the same scientific field and obtained 240 ECTS credits can enroll in the Master's studies. The curricula of both study cycles are continuously innovated. Based on the regulations within the Bologna Convention, students of the Faculty of Economics Brčko have the opportunity to use exchange academic mobility programs such as ERASMUS, TEMPUS, CEEPUS, and their exams passed at the faculties provided by the mobility program are fully recognized.
