= University of East Sarajevo =

University in Bosnia and Herzegovina

Coordinates: 43.8237°N 18.3747°E

- Универзитет у Источном Сарајеву; Univerzitet u Istočnom Sarajevu
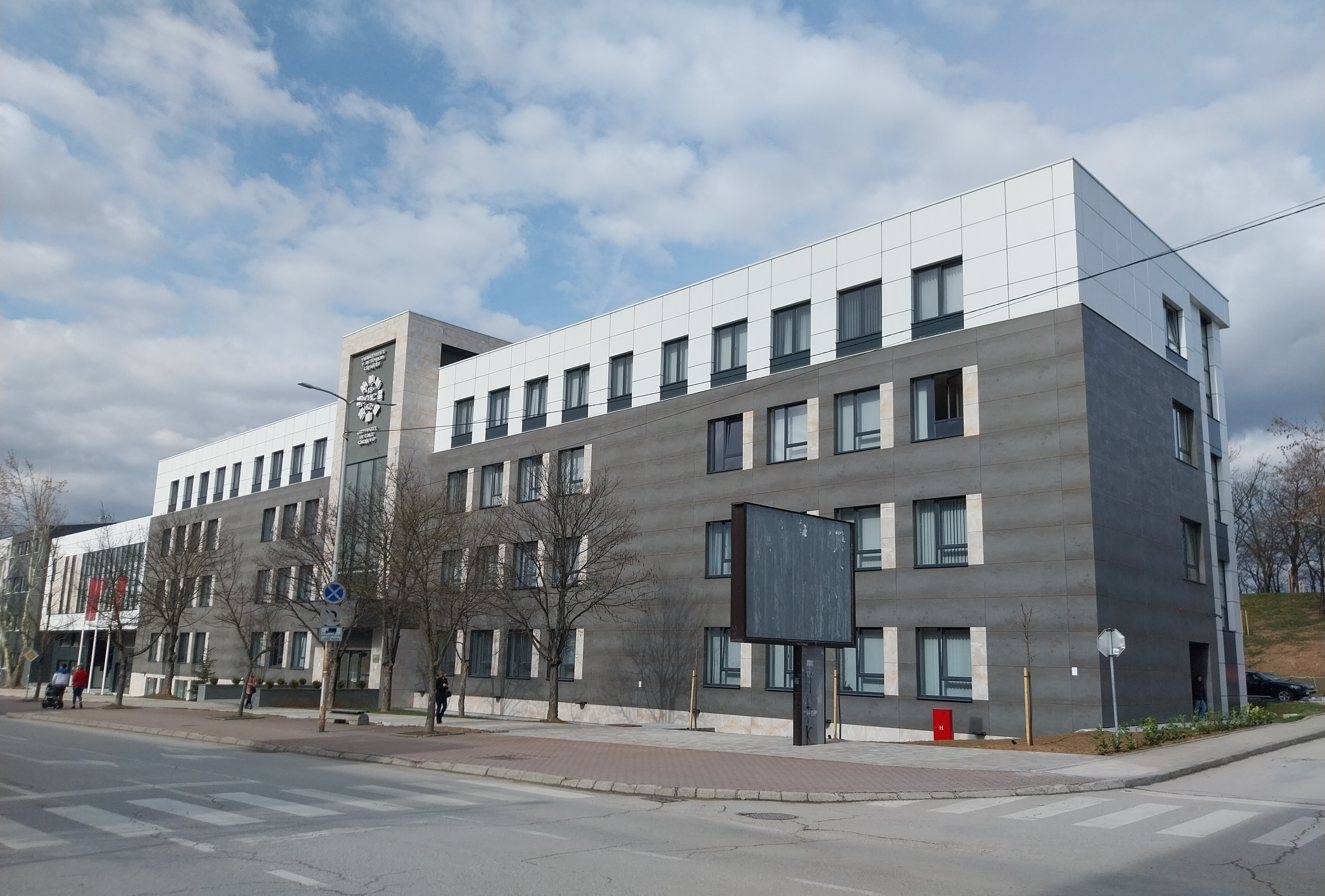
- Rectorate of the University of East Sarajevo is located in Istočno Novo Sarajevo, Istočno Sarajevo
- Type: Public
- Established: 1992; 34 years ago
- Budget: €14.00 million (2015)
- Rector: Milan Kulić
- Academic staff: 933
- Students: 8,049 (2018–19)
- Location: Stefana Nemanje Street No. 5, 71123 Istočno Sarajevo, Bosnia and Herzegovina
- Campus: Urban
- Colors: Blue and Red
- Website: www.ues.rs.ba

The University of East Sarajevo (Serbian: Универзитет у Источном Сарајеву, romanized: Univerzitet u Istočnom Sarajevu lit. University of East Sarajevo) is a public university located in Istočno Sarajevo, Republika Srpska, Bosnia and Herzegovina. As of 2018–19 school year, there are 8,049 enrolled students.

According to SCImago Institutions Rankings, University of East Sarajevo is the best high school institution in Bosnia and Herzegovina.

== History ==
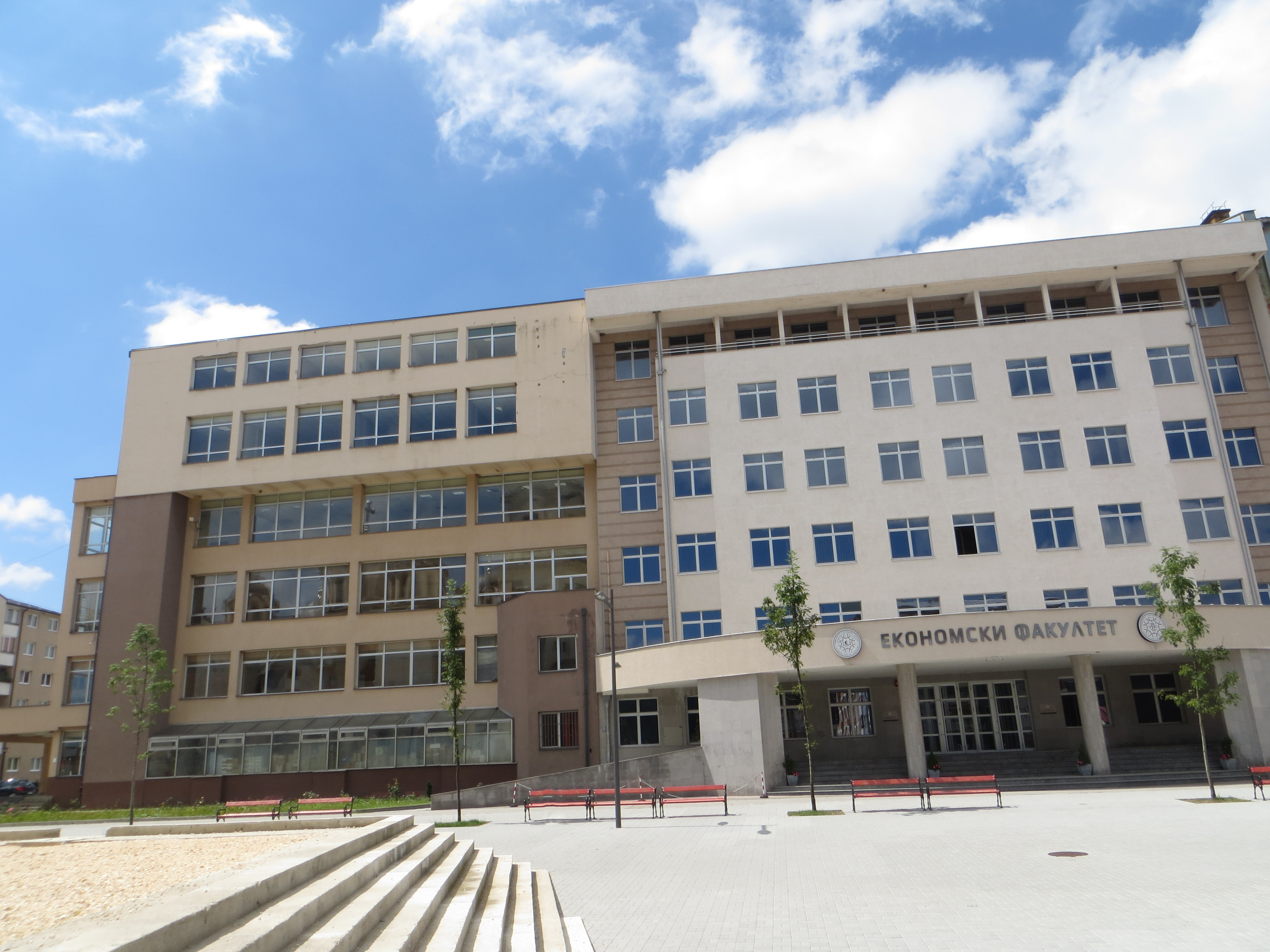
Faculty of Economics in Pale

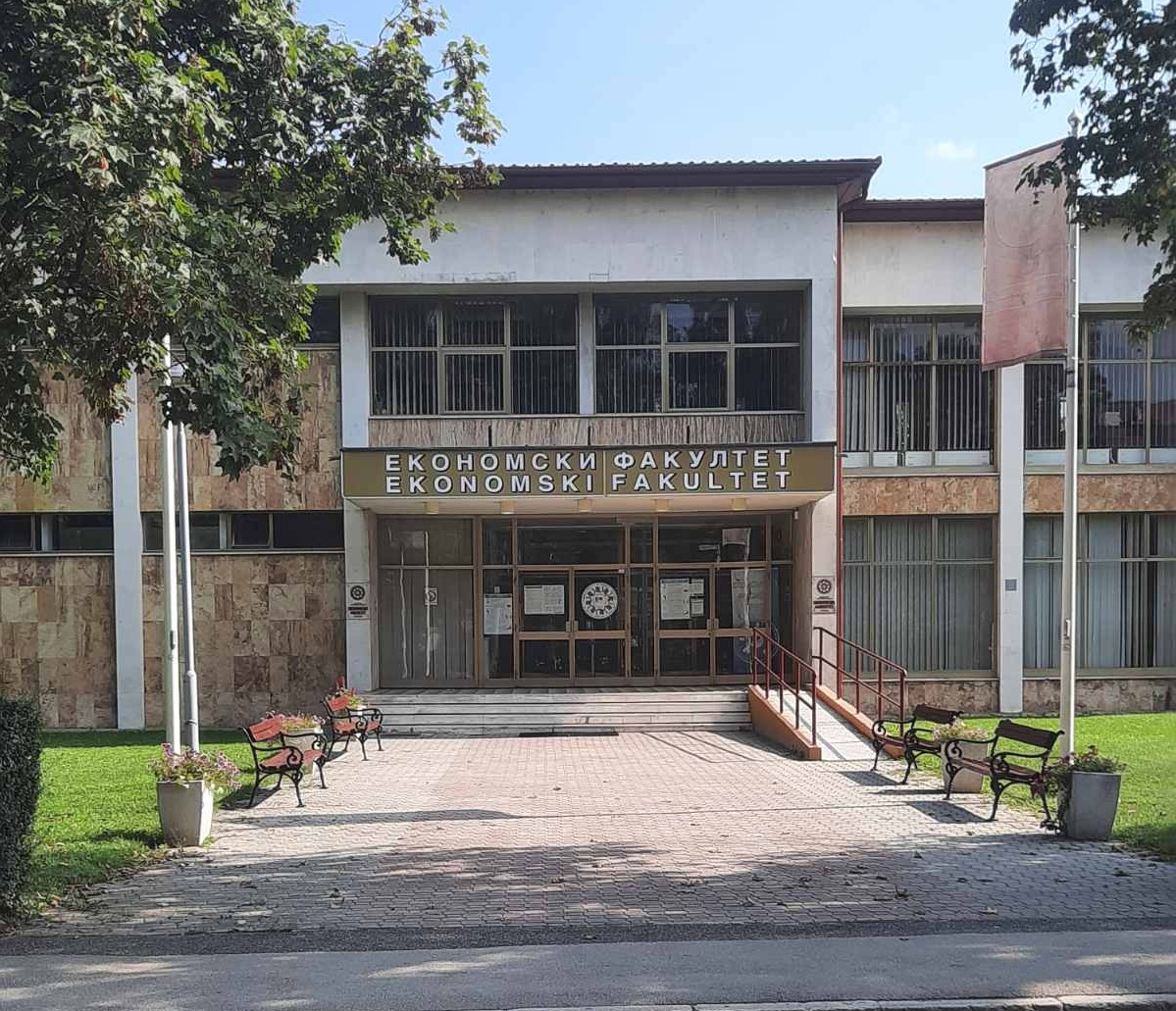
Faculty of Economics in Brčko

It derived from the University of Sarajevo and was established in 1992 by the decision of the National Assembly of Republika Srpska.

It was recognized by the authorities in Republika Srpska as the successor of the University of Sarajevo (1949–1992 period) which ethnic Serb professors, staff and students decided to leave due to the Bosnian War. Serbs who left University of Mostar and University of Tuzla also participated in the establishment of institution. The Faculty of Medicine at the University of Istočno Sarajevo was established in 1993 in Foča and spans over 6,000 square meters with modern facilities, including two amphitheaters, research centers, and laboratories.

University of Istočno Sarajevo is organized into 17 faculties at which student can select among 52 undergraduate and 42 graduate and postgraduate study programs. University is highly geographically decentralized and its faculties are located throughout the eastern half of Republika Srpska (Podrinje, Semberija and East Herzegovina) in the towns of Trebinje, Foča, Pale, Istočno Sarajevo, Bijeljina, Zvornik and Doboj. It was first public university in Bosnia and Herzegovina to get higher education accreditation.

== List of Faculties ==
School	Location	Established
Medicine	Foča	1993
Electrical Engineering	Istočno Novo Sarajevo	1994
Economics	Pale	1993
Economics	Brčko	1997
Philosophy	Pale	1993
Orthodox Theology	Foča	1994
Physical Education and Sports	Pale	1995
Business Economics	Bijeljina	2005
Production and Management	Trebinje	1995
Music	Istočno Novo Sarajevo	1994
Law	Pale	1994
Mechanical Engineering	Istočno Novo Sarajevo	1994
Education	Bijeljina	1994
Agriculture	Istočno Novo Sarajevo	1994
Traffic Engineering	Doboj	2005
Technology	Zvornik	1993
Arts	Trebinje	1995
Institute of Historical Sciences	Pale	2022

== Partner universities ==
Serbia

- University of Niš
- University of Defence
- University of Arts in Belgrade

== See also ==
- Category:Academic staff of the University of East Sarajevo
- University of Sarajevo
- Education in Bosnia and Herzegovina
- List of split up universities
- List of universities in Bosnia and Herzegovina
