= List of universities in Bosnia and Herzegovina =

This is a list of universities in Bosnia and Herzegovina.

== Public ==
List of public universities that are funded through the budgets of Government of the Federation of Bosnia and Herzegovina and Government of Republika Srpska. Also, there is information about the number of enrolled students as of 2018–19 school year.

Name	Entity	Location	Faculties	Founded	Students	Web address
University of Sarajevo	FBiH	Sarajevo	28	1949	30,866	www.unsa.ba
University of Mostar	FBiH	Mostar	11	1977	11,194	www.sum.ba
University of Banja Luka	RS	Banja Luka	18	1975	11,186	www.unibl.org
University of Tuzla	FBiH	Tuzla	13	1976	10,683	www.untz.ba
University of East Sarajevo	RS	East Sarajevo	21	1992	8,049	www.unssa.rs.ba
University of Zenica	FBiH	Zenica	8	2000	3,927	www.unze.ba
University Džemal Bijedić of Mostar	FBiH	Mostar	8	1993	3,313	www.unmo.ba
University of Bihać	FBiH	Bihać	7	1997	2,952	www.unbi.ba

== Private (including standalone faculties and high colleges) ==
- Banja Luka College (Banja Luka)
- Banja Luka College of Communications Kappa Phi (Banja Luka)
- European University, Brčko District, (Brčko District)
- High college CEPS-Center for Business Studies (Kiseljak)
- High college for applied and law sciences "Prometej" (Banja Luka)
- High college for business management "PRIMUS" (Gradiška)
- International Burch University (Sarajevo)
- International University of Goražde (Goražde)
- International University of Sarajevo (Sarajevo)
- University of Travnik (Travnik)
- Paneuropean University ApeiroN (Banja Luka)
- Sarajevo School of Science and Technology (Sarajevo)
- Slobomir P University (Doboj and Bijeljina)
- University College of Prijedor (Prijedor)
- University of Herzegovina (Medjugorje and Mostar)
- University of Modern Sciences - CKM (Mostar, Bosnia and Herzegovina)
- University of Vitez (Travnik)
- University Sinergija (Bijeljina)
- University of Business Engineering and Management (Banja Luka)
