= Faculty of Law, University of Mostar =

- Pravni fakultet Sveučilišta u Mostaru
- Type: Public
- Established: 15 November 1976
- Affiliations: University of Mostar
- Dean: Zlatko Brkić
- Students: 1,582
- Location: Mostar, Bosnia and Herzegovina; 43°20′41″N 17°47′47″E
- Website: pf.sve-mo.ba

Faculty of Law, University of Mostar (Croatian: Pravni fakultet Sveučilišta u Mostaru) is a public institution belonging to the University of Mostar located in Mostar in Bosnia and Herzegovina.

== History ==
Until 1971, Faculty of Law in Mostar was a branch of the University of Sarajevo's Law School. On 15 November 1976, Faculty of Law become started to act independently.

== Organisation ==
As of 2012/13 academic year, the Faculty of Law adopted the Bologna Process and undertook necessary reforms. Undergraduate study lasts for eight semesters (for academic years), and after finishing it, a student gets a bachelor's degree (provostupnik). Graduate study lasts for two semesters (one academic year), and after graduation, a student gains the title of a master of law (magistar). The doctoral study lasts for six semesters (three academic years).

The Faculty of Law has its departments in Vitez and Orašje. Both departments have the undergraduate and the graduate studies.

The doctoral studies have several specialisations: the constitutional law, the criminal law, the civil law, the legal history, the economic law, the international law and the industrial-administrative law.

There are around 1,000 students at the Faculty of Law.
