= Faculty of Electrical Engineering Tuzla =

Faculty of the University of Tuzla

- Fakultet Elektrotehnike Tuzla
- Other names: FET
- Type: Public
- Established: 1976
- Parent institution: University of Tuzla
- Dean: Mensur Kasumović
- Students: 860 (2018–19)
- Location: Tuzla, Bosnia and Herzegovina; 44.5377°N 18.6748°E
- Campus: Urban
- Website: fet.ba

The Faculty of Electrical Engineering Tuzla (Bosnian: Fakultet Elektrotehnike Tuzla) is a higher education institution and a member of the University of Tuzla. (Note: The word Faculty in Europe stands for an academic institution, the sub-unit inside the university.)

== History ==
A department of the Faculty of Electrical Engineering, University of Sarajevo started operating in Tuzla in July 1972. The first generation of 135 students was enrolled in the academic year 1972/1973. The Faculty of Electrical Engineering Tuzla as an independent educational institution was founded in 1976 numbering 361 students in its first year.

Since December 1988, the institution has been known as the Faculty of Electrical and Mechanical Engineering in Tuzla. However, on September 22, 1999, it was divided into two separate entities: the Faculty of Electrical Engineering and the Faculty of Mechanical Engineering.

== Departments ==
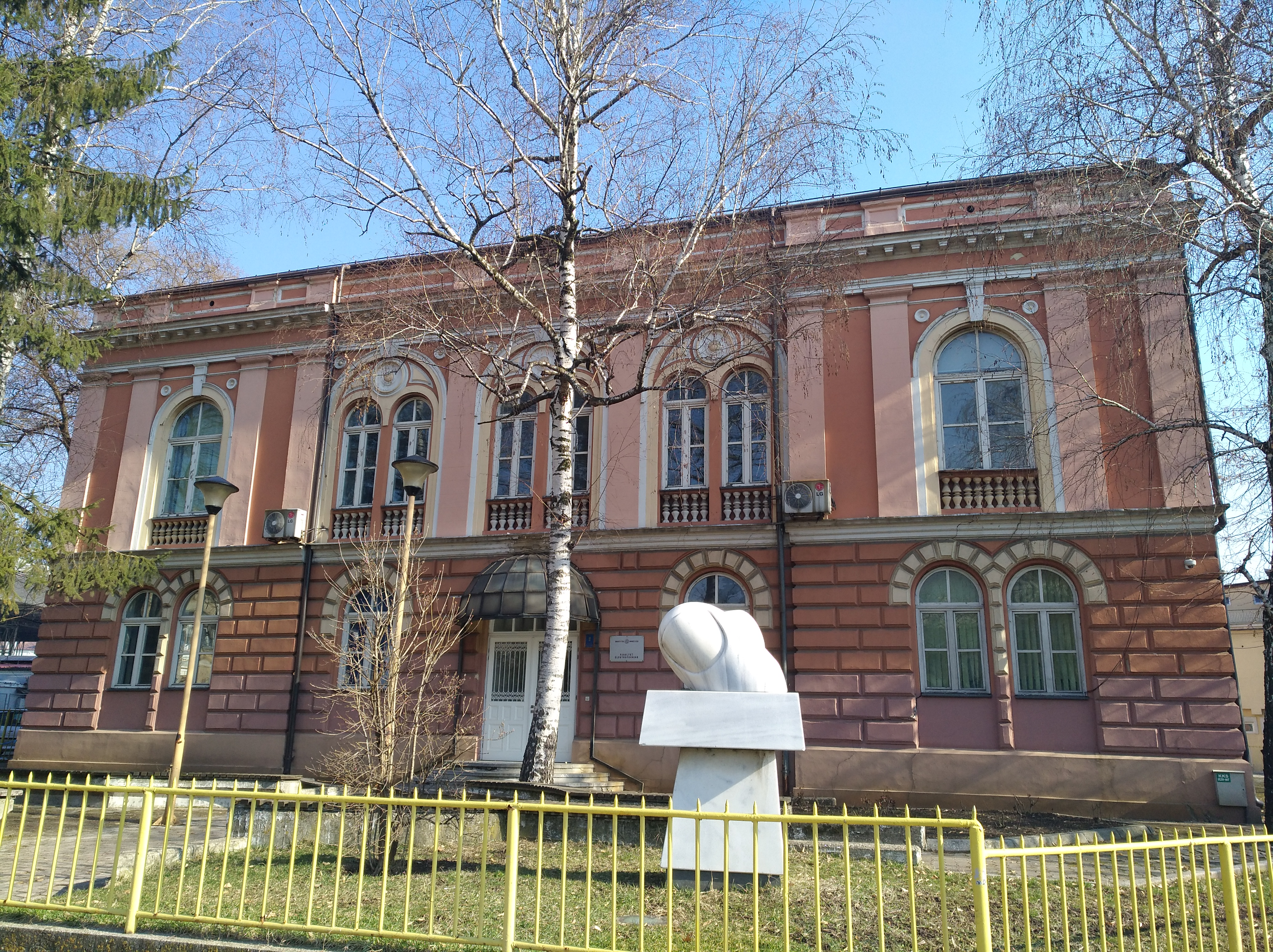
Faculty building

The Faculty is organized into following departments specializing in different areas of electrical engineering and computer science:

- Automation and robotics
- Electric Power Networks and Systems
- Electrical engineering and energy conversion systems
- Computing and Informatics
- Telecommunications and Information Technologies

As well as a separate degree in:

- Technical Education and Informatics

== See also ==
- University of Tuzla
