= University Clinical Hospital Mostar =

Geography
- Location: Mostar, Herzegovina-Neretva Canton, Federation of Bosnia and Herzegovina, Bosnia and Herzegovina
- Coordinates: 43°20′41.6″N 17°47′20.9″E

Organisation
- Care system: Public
- Type: Specialized; Teaching

Services
- Emergency department: Yes

History
- Opened: 1977

Links
- Website: http://www.skbm.ba/

University Clinical Hospital Mostar (Croatian: Sveučilišna klinička bolnica Mostar) is the largest hospital in Mostar, Bosnia and Herzegovina. It is situated in the Bijeli Brijeg neighbourhood of the city, although Clinic for infectious diseases, Clinic for skin and sexually transmitted diseases and Psychiatry clinic are located in the town center in the former Surgery department building. The hospital was originally built as a regional medical centre in 1977. However, the building incurred damage during the war in Bosnia and Herzegovina and upon its repairs, it was upgraded into a hospital in 1997.

Since 1997 the hospital has cooperated with the University of Mostar's Medical Faculty in training medical professionals.
