= Academic grading in Bosnia and Herzegovina =

In Bosnia, the following grading scale applies to elementary and high school students:

1	Insufficient (nedovoljan) – failing
2	Sufficient (dovoljan)
3	Good (dobar)
4	Very good (vrlo dobar)
5	Excellent (odličan)

The following applies to university students:

5	Insufficient (nedovoljan) – failing
6	Sufficient (dovoljan)
7	Good (dobar)
8	Very good (vrlo dobar)
9	Excellent (odličan)
10	Excellent, exceptional (odličan, ističe se)

The entire grading scale was inherited from the Socialist Federal Republic of Yugoslavia and have the same features as Academic grading in Serbia.
