= University Džemal Bijedić of Mostar =

Public University in Bosnia and Herzegovina

Coordinates: 43°21′18″N 17°48′36″E

- Univerzitet "Džemal Bijedić" u Mostaru; Универзитет "Џемал Биједић" у Мостару
- Type: Public
- Established: May 1993; 33 years ago
- Affiliations: European University Association
- Rector: Alena Huseinbegović
- Students: 2,642
- Location: Mostar, Bosnia and Herzegovina
- Campus: Urban
- Website: www.unmo.ba

University Džemal Bijedić of Mostar (Bosnian/Croatian/Serbian: Univerzitet "Džemal Bijedić" u Mostaru, Универзитет "Џемал Биједић" у Мостару) is a public university located in Mostar, Bosnia and Herzegovina. It was established in 1993 and is named after Mostar-born Bosnian and Yugoslav politician Džemal Bijedić. It consists of eight faculties.

== Students ==
Number of students
Academic year	Number of students
2004/05	4,379
2005/06	4,916
2006/07	4,976
2007/08	5,120
2008/09	4,970
2009/10	4,611
2010/11	4,710
2011/12	4,275
2012/13	3,444
2013/14	3,201
2014/15	2,552
2015/16	3,506
2016/17	3,499
2017/18	3,396
2018/19	3,030
2019/20	2,781
2020/21	2,748
2021/22	2,439
2022/23	2,642
2023/24	2,808
2024/25	2,796
2025/26	3,343

== See also ==
- List of universities in Bosnia and Herzegovina
- Education in Bosnia and Herzegovina
- University of Mostar
- List of split up universities
