= University of Bihać =

- Univerzitet u Bihaću
- Type: Public
- Established: 28 July 1997; 28 years ago
- Rector: Prof. dr. Atif Hodžić
- Students: 2,952 (2018–19)
- Location: (Bosnia and Herzegovina) Bihać, Bosnia and Herzegovina; 44°47′25″N 15°51′35″E
- Campus: Urban
- Website: www.unbi.ba

The University of Bihać (Bosnian: Univerzitet u Bihaću) is a public university located in Bihać, Bosnia and Herzegovina. It was established on 28 July 1997.

== History ==
The origins of higher education in this region go back to en earlier date. In 1970, an office of the College of Engineering of Karlovac started its work here, and the Department of Engineering at the College of Engineering in Bihać was established in 1975. A Department of Textile Technology was founded in 1979, as well as the College of Economy.

In 2009, the university had 4,935 graduate students: 3,954 students graduated with college degree and 981 students graduated with faculty degree. In the academic year 2007/2008, 4,881 students were enrolled, 3,407 of which were full-time students and 1,474 part-time students. Since 2006/2007, students have been enrolled in studies according to the principles of the Bologna declaration. The implementation of this principle is burdened with many problems. However, considering the enrollment policy, classes are mostly conducted in line with the Bologna system. This means that class sizes are narrowed to the minimum number permissible, and as such, students are able to receive more direct feedback from teachers and lecturers.

== Faculties ==
The Academy of Pedagogy was founded in 1993, followed by the Islamic Academy of Education in 1995. Today, the University of Bihać comprises seven faculties: Biotechnical Sciences, Economics, Islamic Pedagogical Faculty, Pedagogy, Law, Technical Engineering and College of Nursing Studies, which produce 26 different professions.

== See also ==
- List of universities in Bosnia and Herzegovina
- Education in Bosnia and Herzegovina
