= Tambov State University =

Tambov State University named after G.R.Derzhavin
- Тамбовский государственный университет им. Г. Р. Державина (ТГУ)
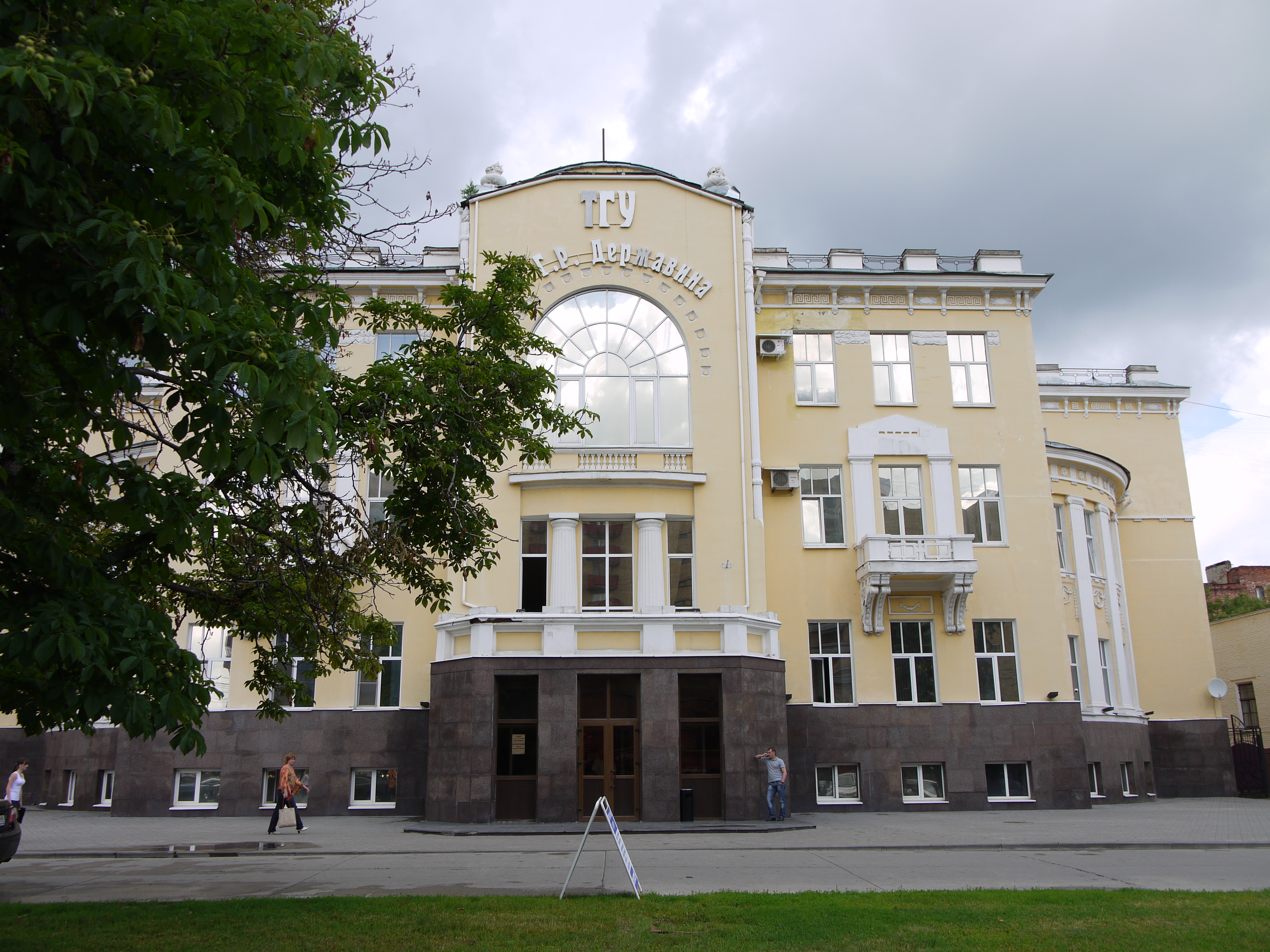
- Type: Public
- Established: 1917
- Rector: Vladimir Y. Stromov
- Administrative staff: 650
- Undergraduates: over 15,000
- Postgraduates: 800
- Location: 392000, Tambov, Internatsionalnaya St., 33, Tambov, Russia; 52°43′15″N 41°26′46″E
- Campus: 18
- Website: Official Website in English Official Website in Russian

Tambov State University named after G. R. Derzhavin (TSU, Derzhavin Tambov State University, Russian: Тамбовский государственный университет имени Г. Р. Державина) is a state university in Tambov, Russia.

== History ==
Sometimes referred to as G. R. Derzhavin State University, it is named in honor of the Russian poet and statesman, Gavrila Romanovich Derzhavin, and was formed in 1994 when the Tambov State Pedagogical Institute and Tambov State Institute of Culture were merged into a single institution.

== Faculties and departments ==
- Mathematics, Physics and Information Technology
  - Department of Computer and Information Technology (IT)
  - Department of Algebra and Geometry
  - Department of Computing and Mathematical Modeling (CMM)
  - Department of Mathematical Analysis
  - Department of Theoretical and Experimental Physics (TEP)
  - Department of General Physics
- Economics
  - Department of Finance and Banking (FiBD)
  - Department of Political Economy and the world global economy (PE and IYC)
  - Department of Business Informatics and Mathematics (BIiM)
  - Department of Accounting and Taxation
- Management and Service
  - Department of Linguistic Support of business processes
  - Department of Service and Trading Business
  - Department of Management and Marketing
  - Department of State and Municipal Management (MCM)
  - Department of Personnel Management
- Medical Institute
  - Department of Microbiology and Infectious Diseases
  - Department of Therapy
  - Department of Public Health and Safety
  - Department of Physiology
  - Department of Surgery
  - Department of Eye and Nerve disease
  - Department of Biochemistry and Pharmacology
  - Department of Anatomy, Operative surgery and Oncology
  - Department of Pathology
  - Department of Obstetrics and Gynecology
  - Department of Traumatology, Orthopedics
  - Department of Clinical Psychology
  - Department of Developmental Psychology
  - Department of Defectology
- Law and National Security
  - Theory and History of State and Law
  - Department of Constitutional and International Law
  - Department of Civil Law
  - Department of Civil and Arbitration Proceedings
  - Department of Criminal Law and Procedure
  - Department of law enforcement and forensic science
  - Department of Human Rights and Democracy
  - Department of Life Safety
  - Department of Specialized Training and National Security
- Philology
  - Department of Linguistics and didactics
  - Department of English Philology
  - Department of German and French Philology
  - Department of Russian and Foreign Literature
  - Department of Russian Language
  - Department of Russian as a Foreign Language
  - Department of Advertising and Public Relations
  - Department of Foreign Languages in Professional Communication
  - Department of Journalism and Publishing
- Humanities and Sociocultural Education
  - Department of Information Resources
  - Department of General History
  - Department of Design
  - Department of Music and Dance
  - Department of Russian History
  - Department of Social and Cultural Communications
  - Department of Theoretical and Applied Sociology
  - Department of International Relations and Political Science
  - Department of Philosophy
- Education
  - Department of General Pedagogy and Psychology
  - Department of theory and methodology of preschool and primary education
  - Department of Social Work
  - Department of Psychological and Pedagogical Education
  - Department of Pre-University Training profile
- Environmental Technologies and Sports
  - Department of Biology
  - Department of Chemistry
  - Department of Ecology and Tourism
  - Department of Geography and Land Management
  - Department of Physical Education
  - Department of Theory and Methodology of Sports Disciplines
  - Department of Theory and Methodology of Physical Education and Sport
  - Department of Adaptive Physical Education

== See also ==
- Tambov State Technical University
