= University of Zenica =

Public university in Zenica, Bosnia and Herzegovina

- Univerzitet u Zenici
- Type: Public
- Established: 18 October 2000; 25 years ago
- Rector: Prof.dr. Jusuf Duraković
- Faculty: 135
- Administrative staff: 210
- Students: 3,927 (2018–19)
- Location: (Bosnia and Herzegovina) Zenica, Bosnia and Herzegovina; 44°11′57″N 17°54′07″E
- Campus: Urban
- Website: www.unze.ba (in Bosnian and English)
- Location within Bosnia and Herzegovina

University of Zenica (Bosnian: Univerzitet u Zenici) is a public university located in Zenica, Bosnia and Herzegovina. The university was founded in 2000, when faculties in Zenica decided to separate from the University of Sarajevo.

== History ==
The college of metallurgy was established in 1950 and has been transferred to Faculty of Metallurgy in 1961 as an outside faculty of the University of Sarajevo. From there more faculties were added and enrollment increased, until an independent University was created by the Parliament of Zenica-Doboj Canton in 2000. The University is member of the Balkan Universities Network.

== Faculties ==
- Faculty of Metallurgy and Technology
- Faculty of Mechanical Engineering
- Faculty of Philosophy
- Faculty of Economics
- Faculty of Law
- Medical Faculty
- Faculty of Islamic Pedagogy
- Polytechnic Faculty

== Institutes ==
- Institute "Kemal Kapetanović"

== Graduate promotion ==
The University hosts annual promotion ceremony for all graduate students of both BA and MA study programme. The ceremony is held every October in Arena Zenica.

== See also ==
- List of universities in Bosnia and Herzegovina
- Education in Bosnia and Herzegovina
