= TEMPUS =

University collaboration program

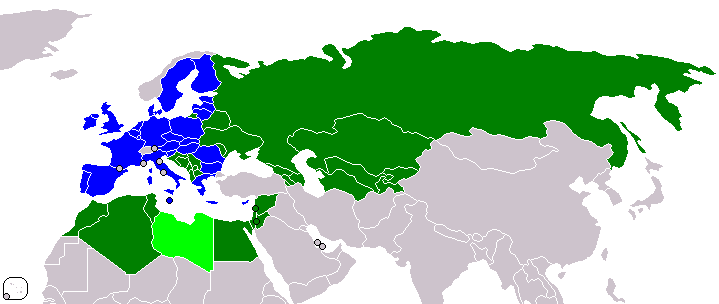
EU Member states TEMPUS partner countries TEMPUS participation under discussion

The TEMPUS (Trans-European Mobility Programme for University Studies) is a program that encouraged higher education institutions in the EU Member States and partner countries to engage in structured cooperation through the establishment of "consortia". The "consortia" implemented Joint European Projects (JEPs) with a clear set of objectives to promote exchanges and mobility of teaching staff and trainers. Such projects could receive financial aid for two or three years. Tempus also provided Individual Mobility Grants (IMGs) to individuals working in the higher education sector to help them work on certain specified activities in other countries.

TEMPUS was adopted on 7 May 1990 by The Council of the European Communities.

As of 1 January 2014, Tempus-like activities, namely capacity building activities, became part of a new cooperation programme called Erasmus+. These activities involve former Tempus member countries, in addition to countries from Latin America, Asia and Africa, the Caribbean and the Pacific.

== Member states ==
Participating countries of TEMPUS included:

- European Union The 27 member states of the European Union.

Partnership countries (organized by region) include:

Europe:

- Albania
- Armenia
- Azerbaijan
- Belarus
- Bosnia and Herzegovina
- Croatia
- Georgia
- Kosovo
- Moldova
- Montenegro
- North Macedonia
- Russia
- Serbia
- Ukraine

Asia:

- Israel
- Jordan
- Lebanon
- Palestine
- Syria

Central Asia:

- Kazakhstan
- Kyrgyzstan
- Tajikistan
- Turkmenistan
- Uzbekistan

Africa:

- Algeria
- Egypt
- Libya (under negotiations)
- Morocco
- Tunisia

== Example projects ==
- Tambov State Technical University's Centre for International Specialist Training (CIST) runs a specialist training course, "English for Students, Lecturers and Administrators of Technical Universities", developed within the framework of TEMPUS.
- According to 2013 figures of the Minister of Education between 1993 and 2013 40% of Ukrainian higher education establishments have participated in TEMPUS projects. In 2008, TEMPUS opened offices in both Jerusalem and Ramallah.

== See also ==
- Bologna Process
- European Higher Education Area
- European Research Area
- Erasmus Programme
