= Vitebsk State Academy of Veterinary Medicine =

Public veterinary university in Belarus

- Віцебская дзяржаўная акадэмія ветэрынарнай медыцыны
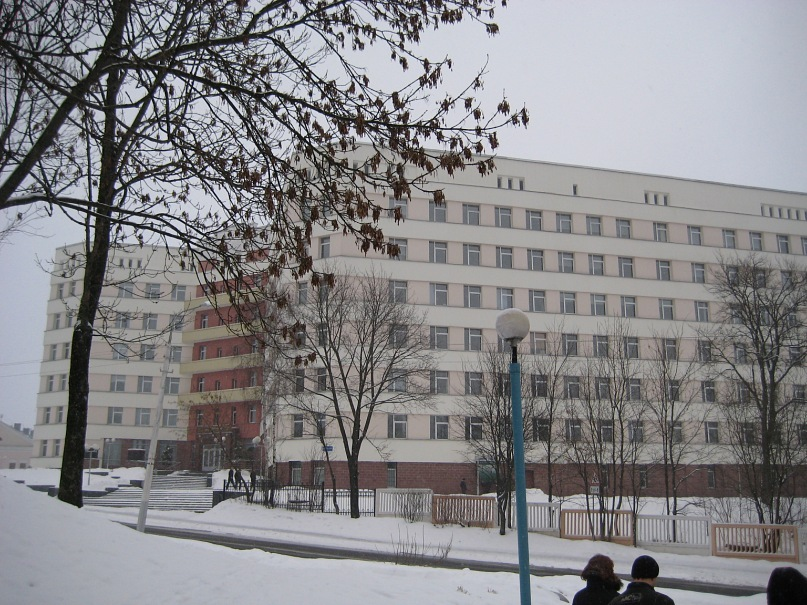
- The university campus
- Former names: Витебский ордена «Знак Почёта» ветеринарный институт имени Октябрьской революции
- Motto: «Человеческая медицина сохраняет человека, ветеринарная медицина оберегает человечество».
- Motto in English: "Human medicine sustains humanity, veterinary medicine protects it"
- Type: Public
- Established: November 4, 1924
- Rector: Prof. Nikolai Ivanovich Gavrichenko
- Academic staff: 355
- Students: over 5,500
- Location: ул. 1-я Доватора, Vitebsk, 220116, Belarus
- Website: vsavm.by

The Vitebsk Government Academy of Veterinary medicine (Belarusian: Віцебская дзяржаўная акадэмія ветэрынарнай медыцыны, romanized: Viciebskaja dziaržaŭnaja akademija vieterynarnaj miedycyny) is a veterinary college located in the city of Vitebsk, Belarus.

== History ==
Before Oct 1, 1994, the university was known as the Vitebsk Veterinary Institute of the Badge of Honor in the name of the October Revolution. In January 1995, Anatolii F. Mogilenko became the rector of the VGAVM.

Two new specializations were added to its department of medicine in 1996: one on toxicology and one on veterinary sanitation. In 1997, a specialization in veterinary bacteriology was added, in 1998 veterinary gynaecology and animal reproduction course was added, and since 2001, a specialization on illnesses of birds, fish, and bees.

Since it was founded in 1924, the institute has taught over 30 thousand veterinary specialists.

The main body of the school is located in the former location of the Krestyansky bank.

== Departments ==
The university consists of four departments:

- Department of Veterinary Medicine — The main department at the university. The department contains 18 divisions, and 7 clinics.
- Department of Biotechnology — this department has been active since 1933. .
- Department for "Advanced training and re-training of personnel"— created in 1966. The main task of this department is to continually train and retain veterinary specialist.
- Department of "International relations, career guidance, and pre-university training" - formed in 1963, it was once first called the "Department of Public Professions".
