= Tambov State Technical University =

Technical university in Tambov, Russia

- Тамбовский государственный технический университет
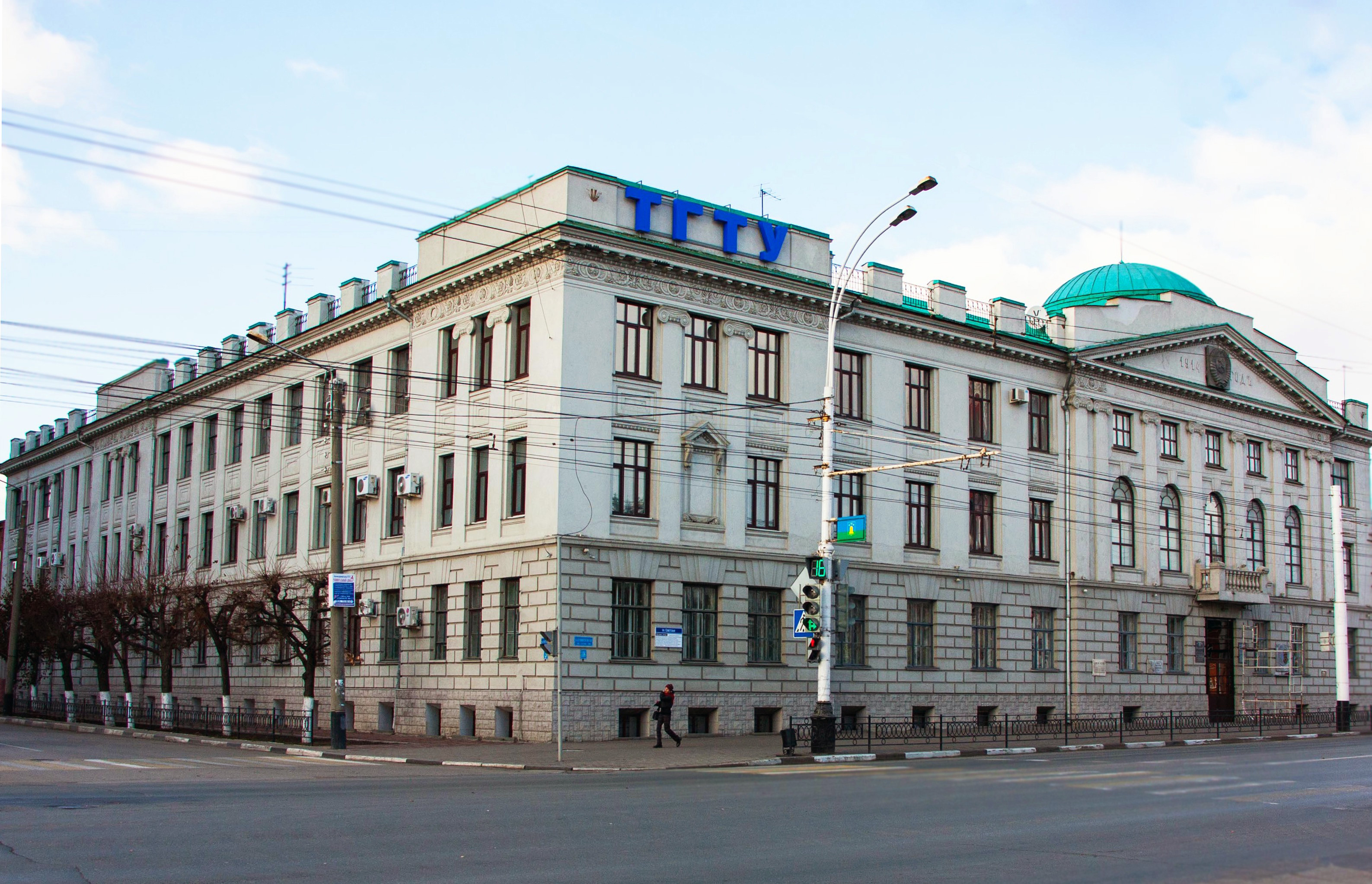
- Former name: Tambov Institute of Chemical Engineering
- Type: Public university
- Established: 1958
- Students: 7000
- Location: Tambov, Russia; 52.7242°N 41.4553°E
- Campus: Urban
- Website: www.tstu.ru

University rankings

Regional – Overall
- QS Emerging Europe and Central Asia: 251-300 (2022)

Tambov State Technical University (Russian: Тамбовский государственный технический университет) is a state institution of higher learning in Tambov, Russia. It was founded in 1958 and specializes in technical sciences (including information and communication technologies) and chemical, electronic, and agricultural engineering.

== History ==
The university was founded in 1958 as the Tambov branch of the Moscow Institute of Chemical Engineering. In 1965, it achieved autonomous status and became the Tambov Institute of Chemical Engineering. It was renamed Tambov State Technical University (TSTU) in 1993. The announcement by Minister of Education and Science Dmitry Livanov of Russian government plans for an eventual merger of the university with Tambov State University was met with a protest rally and march by TSTU students, parents and faculty in October 2012.

== Academics ==
TSTU has 7000 students enrolled in 30 undergraduate and postgraduate programs. Its academic structure encompasses four institutes, ten faculties, two innovation technology centers, the Tambov Regional Center for New Information Technologies, and multiple smaller research centers and laboratories. The university publishes its own theoretical and applied multi-disciplinary, peer-reviewed journal, Transactions of the TSTU (Вестник ТГТУ).

According to the university, it has over 400 international students from 50 countries. Its Centre for International Specialist Training (CIST) runs a specialist training course, "English for Students, Lecturers and Administrators of Technical Universities", developed within the framework of TEMPUS (Trans-European Mobility Programme for University Studies). CIST also developed two five-year degree programs using English as the medium of instruction ("Computer-Aided Design Systems" and "Economics and Business Management"), which enrolled their first student cohorts in 2005.
