= Academic grading in Serbia =

Serbia inherited the academic grading system of the Socialist Federal Republic of Yugoslavia. The grading process uses an absolute achievement scale to determine the grade of a student.

== Primary and secondary school level ==
In elementary schools and secondary schools, a five-point grading scale is used:

- 5 (excellent);
- 4 (very good);
- 3 (good);
- 2 (sufficient) is the lowest passing grade;
- 1 (insufficient) is the lowest possible grade, and the failing one.

In addition, descriptive grades are used to grade a student's conduct and religious or civic education. Religious or civic education grades are not included in the grade average. In elementary schools conduct grades also are not counted in the grade average, while in secondary schools they are.

The student's marks in each subject are averaged at the end of every semester and final grades are determined by the following ranges:

- 5 (excellent) is given for an average of 4.50 to 5.00;
- 4 (very good) is given for an average of 3.50 to 4.49;
- 3 (good) is given for an average of 2.50 to 3.49;
- 2 (sufficient) is given for an average of 1.50 to 2.49;
- 1 (insufficient) is given if the student does not have grade of at least 2 in each topic of the course.

At the end of the school year, final grades for each subject are calculated from those given at the end of each semester. The student's overall achievement is assessed by averaging his grades in all subjects and then applying the above ranges.

Most of Serbia’s primary schools go from Grade 1 to Grade 9, though some schools go from Grade 1 just to Grade 8. This depends on the school and whether it follows the system of the old or the new school law.

== Tertiary (university) level ==
At universities, a six-point grading scale is used:

- 10 (excellent – outstanding),
- 9 (excellent),
- 8 (very good),
- 7 (good),
- 6 (sufficient, passing) is the lowest passing grade,
- 5 (not sufficient, not passing) is the failing grade.

Requirements for "a minimum achieved percentage at all stages of exam taking (written, practical, oral) in order to achieve corresponding grade" is regulated by the statute of each individual institution, but general rules apply:

Grade	Humanities, Medicine, Law, etc.	Science, Engineering, Mathematics, etc.
10	91–100%	96–100%
9	81–90%	86–95%
8	71–80%	76–85%
7	61–70%	66–75%
6	51–60%	56–65%
5	0–50%	0–55%

A student's average for all subjects is calculated to two decimal places (e.g. 9.54).

In practice, the mark of 10 is seldom given as it implies the perfection, which hardly ever characterizes a student's or indeed a lecturer's work. Even 9's are fairly rare. Therefore, an overall grade of 8 is considered a very good pass in any subject. This is especially true in schools of mathematics, science and engineering.

For interim grading, before final marks are given, professors may use credit, percentage, or decimal systems (on a scale of 0–100 credits, 0–100 points, 0–100%, or 1.0–10.0). A mark of 5.5 usually counts as a narrow pass, whereas 5.4 and below constitutes a failure. If no decimal places are used, 6 and up is a pass, and 5 and below a fail. Sometimes when no decimals are used, the additional grade of 6− is used to indicate that the student "barely passed". Failing marks can sometimes be offset by high passes provided the average mark is passing (e.g., a 4 and a 9 would average to 6.5, which is passing). Compensation of marks is usually not allowed in the course specifications, but a lower limit for a compensable grade may be set (marks lower than 4 may not be offset, so a 4 and an 8 ((4+8)/2 = 6) would be passing, while a 3 and a 9, though also averaging to 6, would not be passing.

Depending on the grade, universities can grant some honors (although this system is very limited compared to some other countries). A general heuristic (although this differs between institutions) is that a study average at least grade 9.5, final thesis graded 10, not a single grade below 8 and completing the curriculum without delays will lead to (in Serbian) izvanredan, meaning cum laude, extraordinary. For an average better than 9.0, but not meeting the criteria for cum laude, odličan (excellent) is awarded, and for an average better than 8.0, but not meeting the criteria for excellent – vrlo dobar (very good) is awarded.

== Serbian grading system compared to other systems ==
Converting the numbers of the Serbian grading system into the letters of systems such as those used in the United States and Great Britain, is difficult. It can really only be done if one can compare the frequency distribution of grades in the two systems.

The grades 9 and 10 are hardly ever given on examinations (on average, a 9 is awarded in less than 2%, and a 10 in less than 0.4% of cases). This is because the mark 10 implies perfection (i.e. a 96–100% score on all questions, extraordinary level) and a mark 9 an excellent level, which could be translated as a level close to that of the professor.

As the incidence of a 9 or 10 in Serbian university examinations are considerably lower than that of the top marks in the American or British grading system, it would be a mistake to equate a 10 to an A, a 9 to a B, and so forth. If the 8, 9 and 10 are taken together, as in the table above, they represent up to 15% of examination results. If, in a grading system based on letters, the A represents the top 10% or thereabouts, the grades 8 and above should be represented by A and A− grades.

It should be borne in mind though, that Serbian secondary education is similar to Russian and partially to German; therefore the pre-university secondary education is at much higher level than in many other Western countries. Proof of this claim can be found in the fact that Mathematical Grammar school from Belgrade won only in last 3 years around 60 medals from international competitions, including gold medal from 2008. Russian Olympiad in Mathematics, gold and silver medals from International Olympiads in Mathematics, International Olympiads in Physics and International Olympiads in Informatics, and around 400 in previous 30 years, thus becoming unique in the world. This becomes relevant in comparing quality of students attaining various grades with other systems where more/less candidates are assessed at the level concerned and candidates with less knowledge. Moreover, the equivalence of university preparatory education the world over should not be assumed, the US high-school being considered inadequate for admission to Serbian universities.

Every foreign diploma held by Serbian nationals should undertake process of recognition or equivalence of foreign diploma (e.g. BA, BSc, etc.) or honorary title (e.g. PhD, PhEng, etc.). Not surprisingly, Serbian graduates from US universities (even from the best ones) are not given equivalence automatically, but rather are put in 3rd, 4th or 5th years of diploma studies. Recent examples include graduates from University of California at Berkeley and MIT who were given 8 differential subjects to study at the Faculty of Mathematics, and too many subjects to even get enrolled to final year at the Faculty of Physics so the graduate was enrolled in 3rd year of undergraduate studies of General (not even Theoretical, Experimental, or Applied) physics. Such decisions are to be made by the commissions of faculties in question, and approved or disapproved by the Professors Assembly and, after that, by the dean. Recent example also includes Serbian Minister of Foreign Affairs, Vuk Jeremić, whose Bachelor of Science in Theoretical Physics from the prestigious University of Cambridge could not be recognized as equivalent to diploma by the Faculty of Physics, University of Belgrade, and it took Jeremic more than 8 (eight) years to have his diploma finally recognized in September 2005.

A mark 7 is a good grade, implying the student has good command of the subject matter, but not exceptionally good. Mark 6 implies the student has satisfactory command of the subject matter. Marks 7− and 6+ are a fairly frequent marks in internal use (before the final mark is given, which can be either 7, or 6). As such it relates to the mark B in many other systems, 7− and 7 more likely B+ under systems with a very broad B category.

The conversion of the lowest passing grade may present another problem. A grade of 40% is a clear fail (although an internal mark 4 may be sometimes compensated by high grades obtained in all other tests and colloquia of the same subject). A mark 5, on the other hand, is 'almost satisfactory'. For purposes of assessing student's progress throughout the year, mark 5 is a useful mark and may lead to a pass, provided the student improves in the next tests and retakes the test(s) he/she failed (if the test can be administered again during the same school year). For final exams, a 5 is unacceptable as an average. A mark 5 is slightly below that of the D in many systems: student in some cases may pass certain exam with an average mark between 5 and 6 if one of the higher marks from the same subject is extraordinary (10) or excellent (9).
