= Two schools under one roof =

Form of ethnic segregation

Two schools under one roof (Note: Serbo-Croat-Bosnian: Dvije škole pod jednim krovom) is a term for schools in Bosnia and Herzegovina based on the ethnic segregation of children on the pretext of speaking different languages. Children from two ethnic groups, Bosniaks and Croats, attend classes in the same building, but physically separated from each other and taught separate curricula. Children from one ethnic group enter the school through one door, while children from other ethnic group through another. In the Federation of Bosnia and Herzegovina, 57 schools operated in this way in the year 2010. Students have been protesting against the segregation for years, warning that it increases inter-ethnic hatred. By 2018, 56 such schools remained. This phenomenon of ethnic separation is attributed to the Croat–Bosniak War (1992–1994) and the creation of Herzeg-Bosnia on the territory of Bosnia and Herzegovina. Croatia continues to finance the system of separate Croatian-curriculum public schools in BiH.

== Background ==
On 18 November 1991, the extreme elements of Croatian leadership in Bosnia and Herzegovina, led by Mate Boban and Dario Kordić (who was later convicted by ICTY of war crimes), proclaimed the existence of the Croatian Community of Herzeg-Bosnia, as a separate "political, cultural, economic and territorial whole," on the territory of Bosnia and Herzegovina. Following Herzeg-Bosnia's establishment in November 1991, and especially from May 1992 forward, the Herzeg-Bosnia leadership engaged in continuing and coordinated efforts to dominate and "Croatise" (or ethnically cleanse) the municipalities which they claimed were part of Herzeg-Bosnia (mostly in Herzegovina and Central Bosnia), with increasing persecution and discrimination directed against the Bosniak population. The Croatian Defence Council (HVO), the military formation of Croats, took control of many municipal governments and services, removing or marginalising local Bosniak leaders. Many Bosniaks were removed from positions in government and private business; and Bosniaks in general were increasingly harassed. Many of them were deported to concentration camps: Heliodrom, Dretelj, Gabela, Vojno, and Šunje. Herzeg-Bosnia authorities and Croat military forces took control of the media and imposed Croatian ideas and propaganda. Croatian symbols and currency were introduced, and Croatian curricula and the Croatian language were introduced in schools.

In June 1992 the focus switched to the towns in Central Bosnia, Novi Travnik and Gornji Vakuf, where the Croat Defence Council (HVO) efforts to gain control were resisted. On June 18, 1992 the Bosnian Territorial Defence in Novi Travnik received an ultimatum from the HVO which included demands to abolish existing Bosnia and Herzegovina institutions, establish the authority of the Croatian Community of Herzeg-Bosnia and pledge allegiance to it, subordinate the Territorial Defense to the HVO and expel Muslim refugees, all within 24 hours. Bosniaks rejected the ultimatum which resulted in the attack by Croatian forces on June 19. The Croat–Bosniak War was officially triggered. In March 1994 a peace agreement mediated by the United States between the warring Croats (represented by Republic of Croatia) and Bosnia and Herzegovina was signed in Washington and Vienna which is known as the Washington Agreement. Under the agreement, the combined territory held by the Herzeg-Bosnia and Bosnian government was divided into ten autonomous cantons, terminating Herzeg-Bosnia and establishing the Federation of Bosnia and Herzegovina.

Despite the establishment of the Federation of Bosnia and Herzegovina, the education system resulted in over 50 schools being divided by among ethnic lines, primarily in central Bosnia and Herzegovina. The OSCE highlighted the Central Bosnia Canton and the Herzegovina-Neretva Canton as areas where local authorities remain particularly reluctant to merge schools. The Office of the High Representative (OHR), a body meant to implement peace agreements in Bosnia and Herzegovina, made certain efforts to unify the educational system in related areas, but with little success. Some Croats oppose unification of the schools claiming they would lose their ethnic identity in schools with mixed ethnicities. Some Bosniaks support unification claiming that segregated schools would cause hatred among ethnicities which could destroy Bosnia and Herzegovina. On 12 June 2003, the Peace Implementation Council (PIC) invited the Federal Ministry of Education to implement unification of 'two schools under one roof' before the next school year. A 2003 law on primary and secondary education was supposed to act as an administrative and legal unifier of schools, it has been difficult to implement in Bosnia's complex education system. The Croatian Democratic Union (HDZ), the main Croatian party, stopped the implementation of unification laws in the cantons they had significant influence, especially in Central Bosnia Canton. As a result, High Representative Paddy Ashdown imposed a fine of 20,000 euros ($21,980) on the Croatian Democratic Union party. On 8 July 2005, Paddy Ashdown removed Nikola Lovrinović from the position of the Minister of Education in Central Bosnia Canton for failing to implement laws designed to integrate schools.

== Developments since the late 2000s ==
The removal of the Croatian Democratic Union minister in the Central Bosnia Canton in 2005 by the OHR hasn't resulted in any progress related to the termination of segregation in schools yet. Greta Kuna replaced Lovrinović's position and continued the obstruction supported by Croatian Democratic Union. In 2007, her statement shocked the public when answering the question about 'two schools under one roof': "The ‘Two Schools Under One Roof’ project will not be suspended because you can't mix apples and pears. Apples with apples and pears with pears." - replied minister Kuna.

On 16 February 2010, the parliament of the Federation of Bosnia and Herzegovina adopted a resolution establishing multiethnic school departments in the 57 schools in southern and central parts of Bosnia and Herzegovina. According to media in Sarajevo changes were unlikely to be enacted, even by the next year.

From the 2010s onward, a series of court cases and monitoring reports continued to focus on the practice. In August 2014 the Supreme Court of the Federation of Bosnia and Herzegovina issued a final and binding decision in a discrimination case concerning schools in Stolac and Čapljina, finding that the defendants had discriminated on ethnic grounds; the OSCE later reported that the ruling had not been implemented.

In 2017, numerous prominent writers, scientists, journalists, activists and other public figures from Bosnia-Herzegovina, Croatia, Montenegro and Serbia signed the Declaration on the Common Language, which calls for “abolishing all forms of linguistic segregation and discrimination in educational and public institutions“.

The European Commission's 2021 enlargement report noted that the practice remained in breach of the 2014 ruling and reported that in July 2021 the Constitutional Court found discrimination concerning the practice in Central Bosnia Canton.

Later European Commission reports continued to record a lack of progress. The 2024 report stated that no progress had been made in eliminating the practice and described it as being in breach of 2014 and 2021 rulings of the Federation entity Supreme Court. The 2025 report again called for implementing court rulings to end divided education and said that systemic solutions were still not in place to eliminate the practice.

In 2024, the Council of Europe's European Commission against Racism and Intolerance (ECRI) reported that its long-standing recommendation to abolish the "two schools under one roof" practice and other forms of segregation in education had not been implemented.

== See also ==
- Separate but equal – Discredited US legal doctrine used for racial segregation
