= University of Sopron =

Hungarian university founded in 1735

- Soproni Egyetem (SOE)
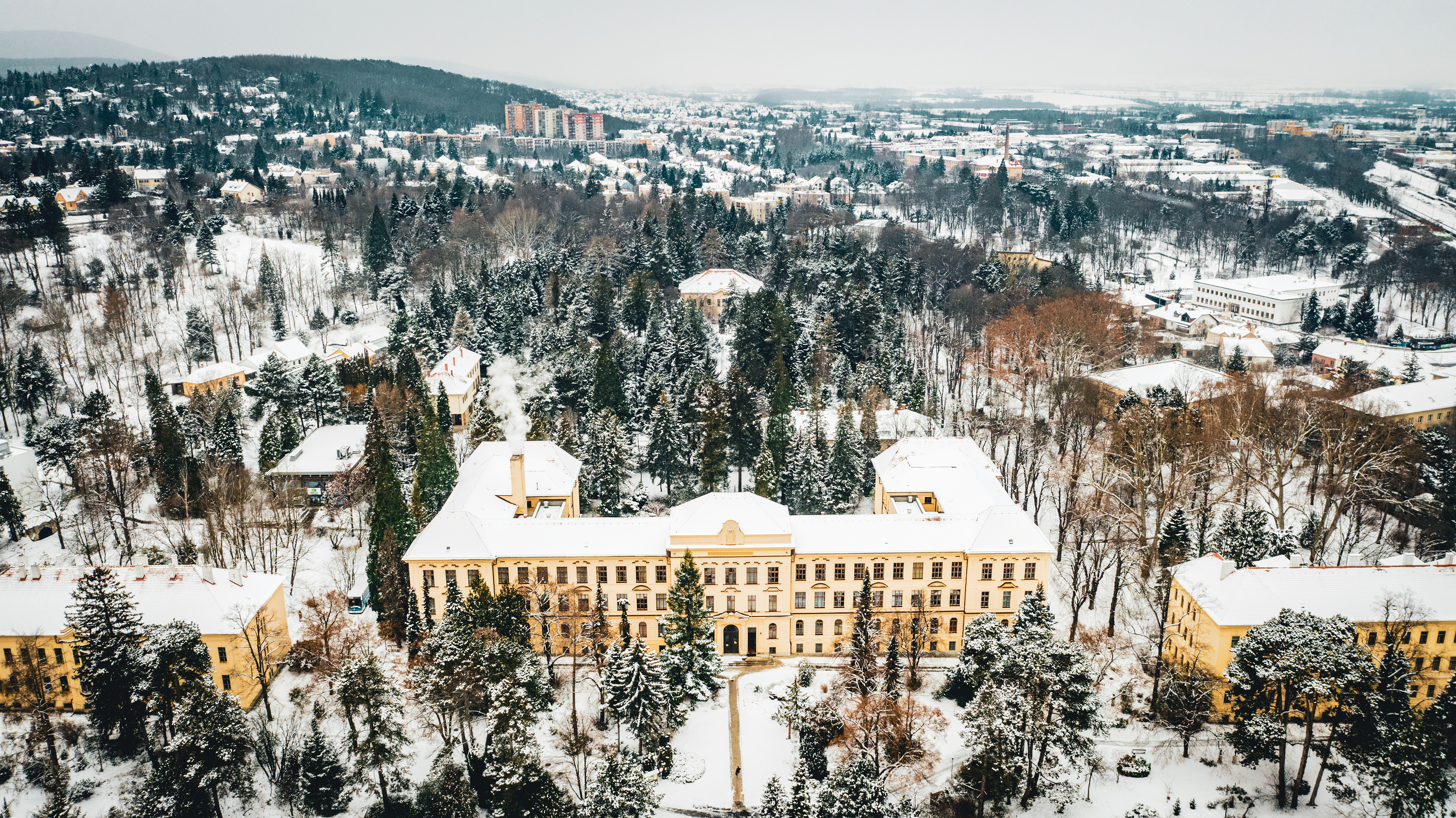
- Other name: University of Western Hungary
- Type: public university
- Established: 1735
- Rector: Prof. Dr. Attila Fábián
- Students: 15000
- Location: 4. Bajcsy-Zsilinszky street, Sopron, 9400, Hungary (EU); 47°40′49″N 16°34′38″E
- Website: www.uni-sopron.hu
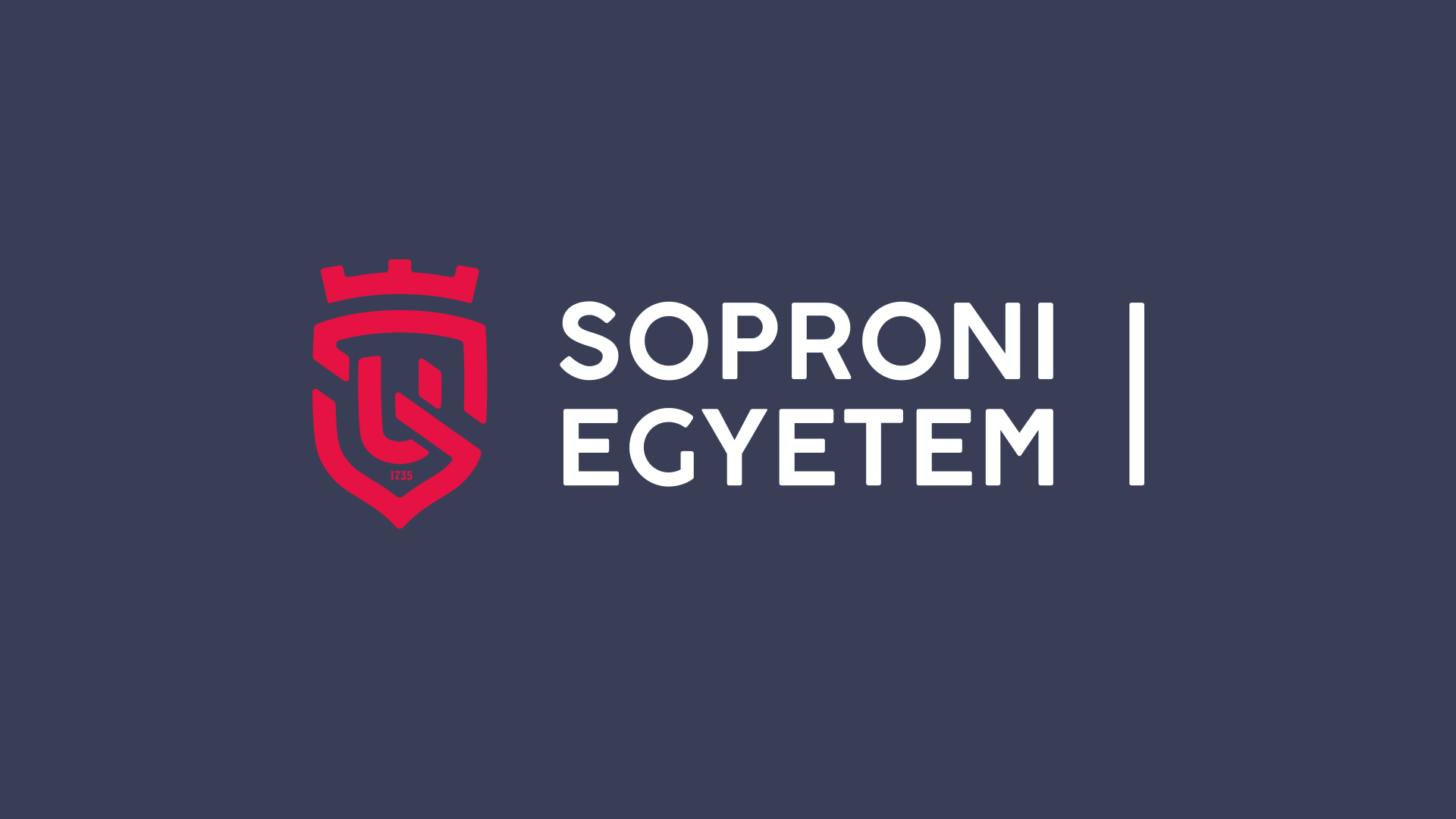

University rankings

Regional – Overall
- QS Emerging Europe and Central Asia: 251-300 (2022)

The main campus of the University of Sopron (Hungarian: Soproni Egyetem, abbreviated SOE) is located in Sopron, Hungary.

The school traces its roots to 1735. The QS World University Rankings placed the University of Sopron in the 251-300 range in the Emerging Europe and Central Asia in 2022.

== Faculties ==
- Benedek Elek Faculty of Pedagogy in Sopron
- Faculty of Forestry in Sopron
- Faculty of Wood Sciences and Creative Industries in Sopron
- Alexander Lamfalussy Faculty of Economics in Sopron

== See also ==
- Open access in Hungary
