= University of Tuzla =

University in Tuzla, Bosnia and Herzegovina

- Univerzitet u Tuzli; Универзитет у Тузли
- Type: Public
- Established: 18 November 1976; 48 years ago
- Rector: Amir Karić
- Academic staff: 500
- Administrative staff: 200
- Students: 10,683 (2018–19)
- Location: Tuzla, Tuzla Canton, Federation of Bosnia and Herzegovina, Bosnia and Herzegovina; 44°31′55″N 18°41′12.7″E
- Campus: Urban
Colors
Red and white
- Affiliations: European University Association
- Website: www.untz.ba

University rankings

Regional – Overall
- QS Emerging Europe and Central Asia: 401-450 (2022)

University of Tuzla (Serbo-Croatian: Univerzitet u Tuzli, Универзитет у Тузли) is a public university located in Tuzla, Bosnia and Herzegovina. The university was founded in 1958. It became a proper university in 1976, and today is one of the major institutions of higher learning in Bosnia and Herzegovina.

In the academic year of 2014–2015, the total number of enrolled students in all faculties and academies was 10,683. The total number of enrolled students has shown a steady decline from the academic year 2010–2011, when 14,212 students were enrolled at the university.

== History ==
A college of mining was established in 1958 and Faculty of Chemical Engineering in 1959 as the first faculty outside University of Sarajevo; the college then had 159 students. The Mining School developed into a Faculty of Mining in 1960. From there, more faculties were added and enrollment increased until an independent university of higher education was created in 1976. 1970's was a decade of exponential rise in number of higher education institutions in the former Yugoslavia when alongside Tuzla universities in Osijek, Rijeka, Split, Mostar, Podgorica, Bitola, Maribor, Banja Luka and Kragujevac all opened their doors.

== Sport ==
In the 2000s, the Basketball club UKK Student, which competes in A1 League (2nd Tier on Pyramid), was established at the university.

== Faculties and Academies ==
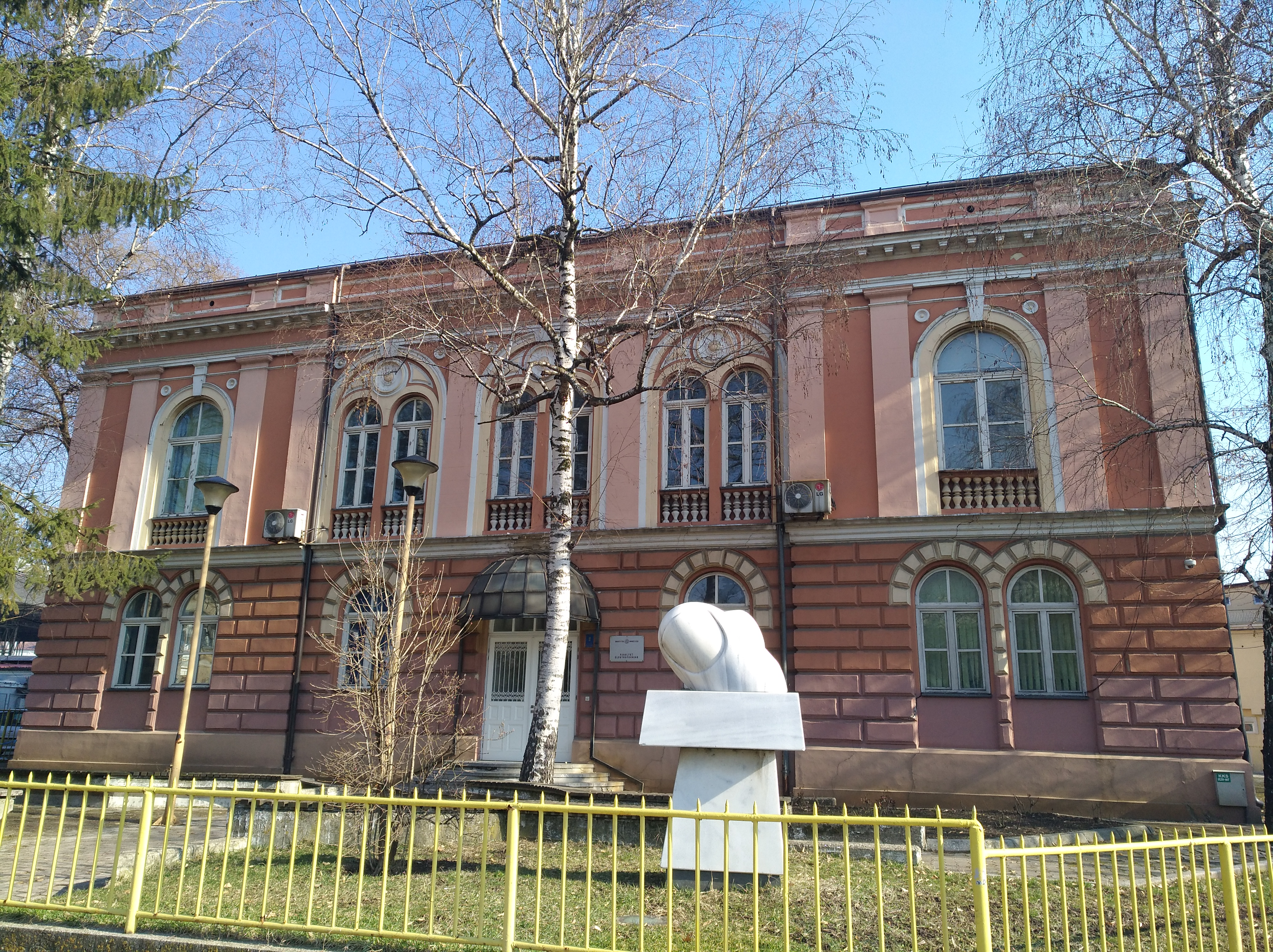
Faculty of Electrical Engineering

- Academy of Performing Arts
- Faculty of Law
- Faculty of Education and Rehabilitation
- Faculty of Economics
- Faculty of Electrical Engineering
- Faculty of Mechanical Engineering
- Faculty of Chemical Engineering and Biotechnology
- Faculty of Mining, Geology and Civil Engineering
- Faculty of Medicine (six year study)
- Faculty of Natural Sciences and Mathematics
- Faculty of Philosophy
- Faculty of Pharmacy
- Faculty of Physical Education and Sport

== Research and publications ==
The university publishes textbooks, research books, and several peer reviewed journals. Since 2016, the Faculty of Philosophy publishes the journal Social Sciences and Humanities Studies (Društvene i humanističke studije DHS). Professor Vedad Spahić serves as the Editor-in-Chief.

== See also ==
- Balkan Universities Network
- List of universities in Bosnia and Herzegovina
- Education in Bosnia and Herzegovina
