= University of Herzegovina =

Herzegovina University
- Sveučilište Hercegovina
- Type: Private
- Established: 2010
- Founder: FDZMB, CKM and FMOD
- Affiliations: International Association of Universities
- Rector: Ivica Radovanovic, PhD
- Academic staff: 110
- Location: (Bosnia and Herzegovina) Mostar and Medjugorje, Bosnia and Herzegovina; 43°20′26.3″N 17°48′26.7″E
- Campus: Urban K. M. Viševića Humskog bb, Mostar 88000, Bosnia & Herzegovina
- Website: hercegovina.edu.ba

Herzegovina University (Croatian: Sveučilište Hercegovina, Latin: Universitas Studiorum Hercegoviniensis) was established in 2010 in Medjugorje by merging three independent higher education institutions into University.

== University organization ==
Herzegovina University consists of two faculties, Faculty of Social Sciences dr Milenko Brkic (FDZMB) and Faculty of International Relations and Diplomacy (FMOD), Center for Research, Education, Development and Training, University Library, University Centers and Student Center.

Study programmes:

- Psychology,

- Special Education and Speech Treatment,

- Pedagogy and Social Pedagogy,

- Early and Pre-School Education,

- Teacher Education,

- Sociology and Political Sciences,

- Management and Public Administration,

- Information and Communication Sciences,

- Tourism,

- Ecology and Environment Protection,

- International Relations and Diplomacy,

- Law in International Relations.

== Memberships ==
In 2017, Herzegovina University became a member of International Association of Universities (International Association of Universities).

In 2017, Herzegovina University became a member of Association of Rectors of Private Universities in Bosnia and Herzegovina.

In 2021, Herzegovina University became a member of Race to Zero for Universities and Colleges Network.

In 2021, Herzegovina University became a member of GWCN (Global Waste Cleaning Network).
