= University of Mostar =

Public university in Bosnia and Herzegovina

- Sveučilište u Mostaru
- Type: Public
- Established: 11 February 1977; 49 years ago
- Affiliations: European University Association
- Rector: Ivo Čolak
- Faculty: 1,002
- Administrative staff: 156
- Students: 8,010
- Location: Mostar, Bosnia and Herzegovina; 43°20′32″N 17°48′09″E
- Campus: Urban
- Website: www.sum.ba

University rankings

Regional – Overall
- QS Emerging Europe and Central Asia: 301-350 (2022)

The University of Mostar (Croatian: Sveučilište u Mostaru; Latin: Universitas Studiorum Mostariensis) is a public university located in Mostar, Bosnia and Herzegovina.

The university has ten faculties and one Academy of Fine Arts, with 50 majors, 46 specializations and 70 study groups.

== History ==
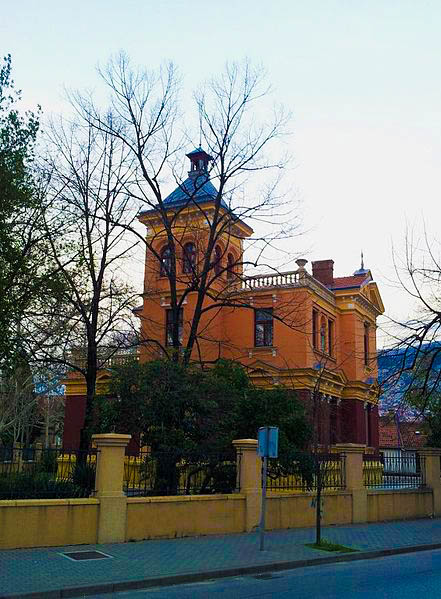
University of Mostar Rectorate Building in Rondo Square Mostar

Croatian nationalists claim the university's roots date back to 1895, when the Franciscan theological school was established in the village of Široki Brijeg.

The University of Mostar is the only Croatian language university in Bosnia and Herzegovina, with around 1,000 employees. There are ten faculties, the Academy of Fine Arts, eight institutes and the student centre within the university.

The University of Mostar participates in the Rectors' Conference of Bosnia and Herzegovina, and it is also an associate member of the Croatian Rectors' Conference. The university seal shows the building of the Franciscan monastery.

On 7 and 8 February 2019 University was the host of the Third Rector's Forum of the Southeastern Europe and Western Balkans which followed the first forum in Novi Sad, the second in Zagreb and preceded the fourth one in Podgorica. Representatives of over 30 institutions from the region attended the event.

== Organisation and administration ==
- Faculty of Agriculture and Food technology (APTF)
- Faculty of Economics (EFMO)
- Faculty of Civil engineering, Architecture and Geodesy (FGAG)
- Faculty of Medicine (MEFMO) affiliated with University Clinical Hospital Mostar
- Faculty of Health sciences (FZS)
- Faculty of Pharmacy (FARFMO)
- Faculty of Humanities (FFMO)
- Faculty of Natural science, Mathematics and Education (FPMOZ)
- Faculty of Law (PFMO)
- Faculty of Mechanical engineering, Computer engineering and Electrical engineering (FSRE)
- Academy of Fine arts (ALU)
- Institute of Economy
- Institute of Civil engineering
- Institute of Croatian language
- Institute of Literature and History
- Institute of Latinity
- Institute of Mechanical engineering
- Institute of Law
- Institute of Social Research
- Institute of Research and Development in Karst

== Students ==
The University of Mostar has around 16,000 students, which makes it the third largest university in Bosnia and Herzegovina. Through years, the University of Mostar saw rapid growth in number of students. In the academic year of 2006–07, it had 6,256 students, while in 2014–15 it had 10,712 students.

The number of foreign students, of whom the vast majority are from neighbouring Croatia, is also growing. In the academic year of 2008–09, there were 292 students from Croatia, while in 2012–13 there were 644. In 2014–15, students from Croatia comprised 17% of the total student population.

Number of students
Academic year	Number of students
1995/96	3,200
2004/05	5,556
2005/06	5,864
2006/07	6,256
2007/08	6,993
2008/09	7,767
2009/10	8,298
2011/12	9,431
2012/13	9,896
2013/14	11,193
2014/15	10,712
2015/16	9,966
2016/17	9,781
2017/18	9,758
2018/19	9,418
2019/20	8,158
2020/21	8,737
2021/22	8,155
2022/23	7,510
2023/24	6,867
2024/25	7,135
2025/26	7,311

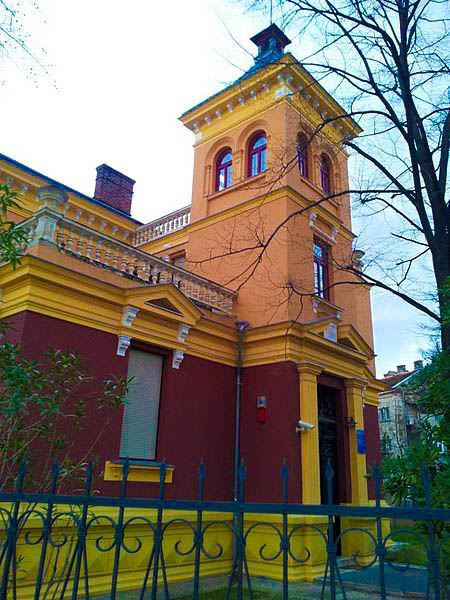
University of Mostar Rectorate Building in Rondo Square Mostar

== See also ==
- Balkan Universities Network
- List of universities in Bosnia and Herzegovina
- Education in Bosnia and Herzegovina
- University Džemal Bijedić of Mostar
- List of split up universities
