= List of law schools in Serbia =

There are nine law schools in Serbia.

== Public ==
- Belgrade Law School (University of Belgrade)
- Kosovska Mitrovica Law School (University of Priština)
- Kragujevac Law School (University of Kragujevac)
- Niš Law School (University of Niš)
- University of Novi Sad Faculty of Law (University of Novi Sad)
- School of Law, State University of Novi Pazar

== Private ==
- School of Law, Union University of Belgrade
- Faculty of Law, Megatrend University

== Historical ==
- Subotica Law School (University of Belgrade)
