= Jasmina Ahmetagić =

Serbian academic

- Born: 1970; Belgrade, Serbia, Yugoslavia
- Education: Faculty of Philology
- Occupation: literary critic
- Notable work: The inner side of postmodernism: a look at the theory
- Awards: Nikola Milošević

Jasmina Ahmetagić (Belgrade, 1970) is a Serbian professor, researcher, literary critic, theorist and poet who has published a number of books analyzing the prose and works of other authors.

== Biography ==
She was born in 1970 in Belgrade. She graduated from the Faculty of Philology in Belgrade, where she received her master's and doctoral degrees with the topic "Biblical subtext of Serbian prose from the second half of the twentieth century (R. Konstantinović, M. Kovač, D. Kiš, M. Pavić, B. Pekić, V. Dobrivojević)". She is a Doctor of Literary Sciences, Associate Professor and Senior Research Associate. She taught at the Zemun Gymnasium, worked twice in the National Library of Serbia, where she was engaged in proofreading. She also taught at the International University and the State University in Novi Pazar, Alfa University in Belgrade and worked at the Institute of Serbian Culture in Kosovo. For the last few years, she worked at the UNESCO International Institute for Educational Planning in Leposavić. On 27 January 2015, she received the "Nikola Milošević" award for the book "The Storyteller and the Story". The award is given for the best work in the field of philosophy, aesthetics and theory of literature and art.

== Works ==
In her 2005 book, The inner side of postmodernism: a look at the theory, Ahmetagić openly and sharply re-examines the literary work of academician Milorad Pavić, mostly the one who was defended by critics at any cost, and most often with postmodernist theoretical apparatus. The first part of the book examines Pavić as, according to postmodern critics, the most valuable and typical representative of Serbian postmodernism, and the second part of the book examines postmodernism itself, from the point of view of the statements given to it by its proponents.

== Selected works ==
- — (2020). Znati unapred: paranoja u srpskoj književnosti [Know In Advance: Paranoia In Serbian Literature] (in Serbian). Institut za srpsku kulturu.
- — (2017). Knjiga o Kamiju : poetika mere [A Book About Camus: The Poetics of Measure] (in Serbian). Dereta. ISBN 978-8664571234.
- — (2016). Proza Duse [Prose of the Soul] (in Serbian). Dossier. ISBN 978-8660471996.
- — (2014). Pripovedac i prica [The Storyteller and the Story] (in Serbian). Institut za srpsku kulturu. ISBN 978-8689025200.
- — (2013). Knjiga o Dostojevskom : bolest prekomernog saznanja [A Book About Dostoevsky: The Disease of Excessive Knowledge] (in Serbian). Dereta. ISBN 978-8673469249.
- — (2012). Nevidljivo zbivanje : pravoslavna duhovnost u prozi Grigorija Bozovica [The Invisible Event: Orthodox Spirituality in Grigorij Bozovic's Prose] (in Serbian). Institut Za Srpsku Kulturu. ISBN 978-8689025057.
- — (2011). Price o Narcisu zlostavljacu : zlostavljanje i knjizevnost [Stories of Narcissus the Abuser: Abuse and Literature] (in Serbian). Sluzbeni glasnik. ISBN 978-8651908012.
- — (2009). POTRAGA KOJA JESAM - O prozi Vladana Dobrivojevica [THE SEARCH I AM - About Vladan Dobrivojevic's prose] (in Serbian). Draslar. ASIN B009NF4NQK.
- — (2007). Dazd od zivoga ugljevlja : citanje s Bibliom u ruci: proza Danila Kisa i Mirka Kovaca [A Rain of Coal: A Reading with the Bible in Hand: Prose by Danilo Kis and Mirko Kovac] (in Serbian). Draslar. ISBN 978-8676140749.
- — (2006). Antropopeja : biblijski podtekst u Pekicevoj prozi [Antropopeja: Biblical Subtext in Pekić's Prose] (in Serbian). Draslar. ISBN 978-8676140480.
- — (2005). Unutrasnja strana postmodernizma (Pavic) [The Inner Side of Postmodernism (Pavic)] (in Serbian). Raška Škola. ASIN B009D3YC1S.
- — (2001). Antički mit u prozi Borislava Pekića [Ancient Myth in the Prose of Borislav Pekić] (in Serbian). Literary Word.
