= List of educational institutions in Belgrade =

This is a list of educational institutions located in Belgrade, Serbia.

== Higher education ==
- University of Belgrade
- University of Arts
- University of Defence
- Singidunum University
- Megatrend University
- Union University
- Institute of Political Studies in Belgrade
- Braća Karić University
- European University in Belgrade

== Secondary education ==
Gymnasiums in Belgrade:

- First
- Philological
- Third
- Fourth
- Fifth
- Sixth
- Seventh
- Eighth
- Ninth
- Tenth
- Sport
- Twelfth
- Thirteenth
- Fourteenth
- Fifteenth
- Saint Sava
- Zemun
- Mathematical
- Obrenovac
- Mladenovac
- Lazarevac

== Primary education ==
- Primary school "Petar Petrovic Njegos"
