= FEFA =

University in Serbia

Coordinates: 44.814268°N 20.427458°E

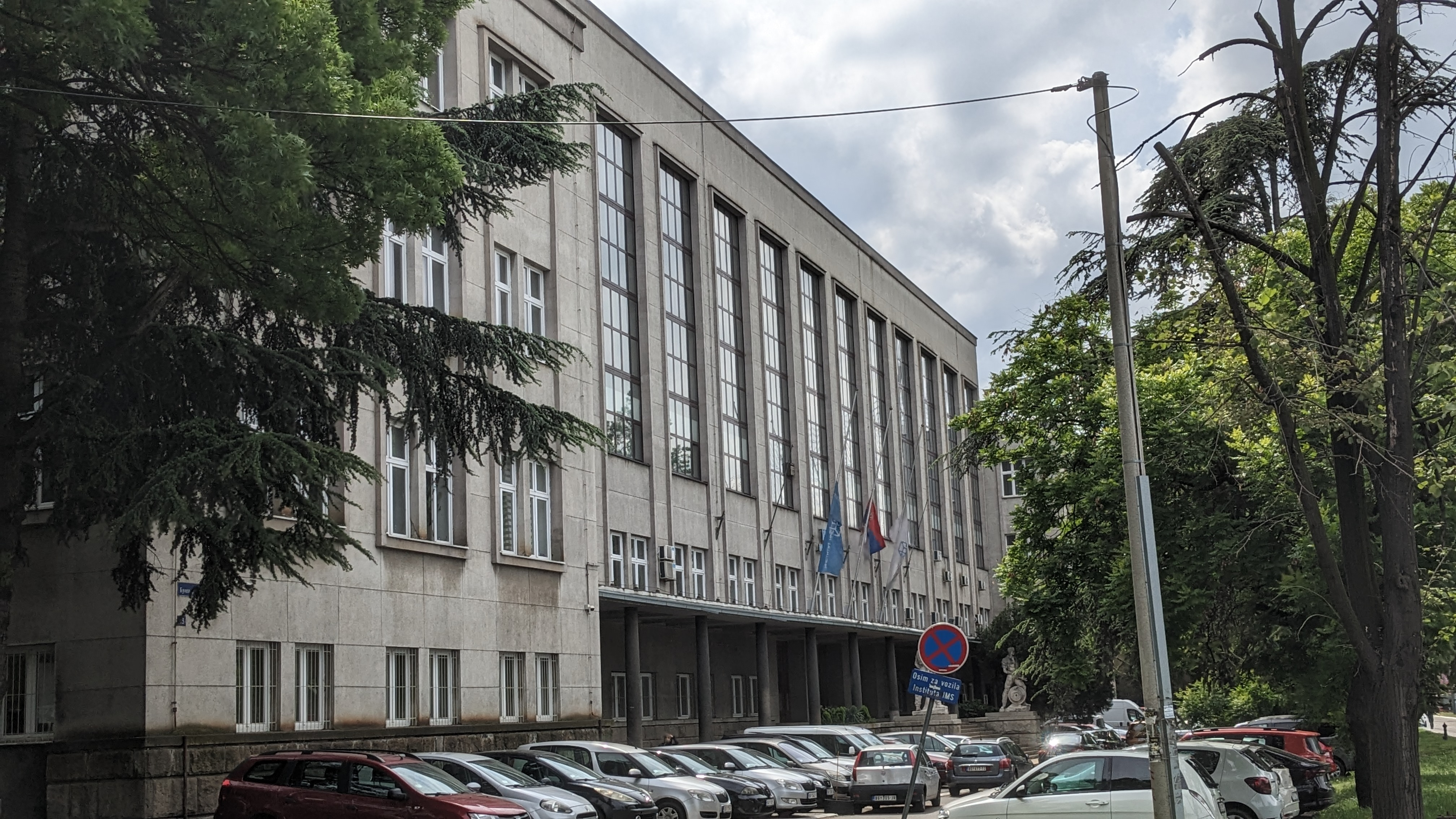
- Motto: You are the future
- Type: Private business school
- Established: 2003; 23 years ago
- Founders: Goran Pitić; Nebojša Savić
- President: Goran Pitić
- Dean: Milan Nedeljković
- Faculty: 36 (2023)
- Students: 354 (2023)
- Undergraduates: 313 (2023)
- Postgraduates: 36 Master's (2023); 5 PhD (2023)
- Location: Novi Beograd, Belgrade, Serbia
- Campus: Urban
- Website: http://www.fefa.edu.rs/

FEFA (Serbian: ФЕФА / FEFA), officially Metropolitan University - FEFA (Serbian: Универзитет Метрополитан - ФЕФА / Univerzitet Metropolitan - FEFA), formerly known as Faculty of Economics, Finance and Administration as a part of Singidunum University is a faculty in Novi Beograd, Belgrade, Serbia. It has been founded in 2003, and while de facto remaining independent, it was initially a member of Singidunum University and now is a member of the Metropolitan University. This higher education institution received its accreditation certificate in 2008, as first economics and management school in the country to do so under rules established by new Law on Higher Education, renewing these certificates in 2014, 2017 and 2024.

== Courses offered ==
FEFA offers both undergraduate and graduate courses, in accordance with accreditation awarded by the Commission for Accreditation and Quality Assurance of the Republic of Serbia. Unlike other traditional European institutions, the school only offers a select number of programs. Degrees and study programs are compatible with Bologna process, aimed at making academic degree standards and quality assurance standards more comparable and compatible throughout Europe:

=== Bachelor's Degree (240 ECTS) ===
- Economics - Economics and Business 5.0

Economics – Economics and Business 5.0

The Economics and Business 5.0 study programme helps students understand the evolving business environment. Students gain practical knowledge and skills that enable them to create value in the modern economy and prepare for future employment opportunities.

The programme focuses on the digital economy, startup creation and development, emerging technologies, marketing, sustainable business practices, management, and psychology. It also encourages innovation, creativity, learning, and networking with business leaders who are shaping the future.

- Economics - Psychology and Business (Since 2021)

Psychology plays a key role in transforming business. During the studies, the focus is not only on motivation, perception, and decision-making, but on everything that encompasses a better understanding of people and teams, resulting in better business decisions and an agile business environment. The program is designed to develop psychologists who deeply understand the business environment and economists with an enhanced understanding of people and organizations. It offers an individual-centric approach, emphasizing a deep understanding of customer relations, employee management, and investor decision-making.

- Audio-visual Production (Until 2023)

=== Master's Degree (300 ECTS) ===
- Marketing and Management
  - Courses:

=== Ph.D. Studies (480 ECTS) ===
- Business Economics

FEFA Faculty, drawing on 15 years of experience rooted in an understanding of the contemporary business world, economics, and finance, has shaped an accredited doctoral program in business economics modeled after the most prestigious universities in the world. These three-year studies practically combine finance and business, economics, banking, and public policies, enabling each doctoral candidate to acquire and advance relevant knowledge in areas of their interest. The program covers fields such as econometrics, risk management, investment financing, economic policies and more.

== Research ==
Faculty operates research institute with four independent research and consulting units, which engage both in academic and applied research, as well as in for-profit courses such as executive education or consultancy services:

- Center for European Integration and Public Administration
- Center for Financial Research and Corporate Consulting
- Center for Advancement of Competitiveness
- Center for Career Guidance and Counselling

Center for European Integration and Public Administration organizes an annual conference on European integration issues, on or around May 9 (at the occasion of Europe Day). In 2009, this center published a 64-researcher cost-benefit study on impact of Serbia's EU accession, in cooperation with Serbian Government and Serbian Chamber of Commerce.

== International cooperation ==
FEFA is an affiliate institution of the Harvard Business School (HBS) Institute for Strategy and Competitiveness, with teaching courses developed by HBS and hosting teleconferences by HBS Professors.

By way of European TEMPUS projects, FEFA cooperated with:

- University of Belgrade, Serbia
- Bielefeld University, Germany
- Charles University, Czech Republic
- University of Banja Luka, Bosnia & Herzegovina
- University of Florence, Italy
- University of Kragujevac, Serbia
- Megatrend University, Serbia
- University of Montenegro, Montenegro
- New Bulgarian University, Bulgaria
- University of Novi Sad, Serbia
- Union University, Serbia
- University of Valencia, Spain
- Politechnic University of Valencia, Spain

== International competitions ==
The faculty operates a case study competition section, under the mentorship of doc. dr Aleksandar Vučković, which has achieved numerous successes in various international case competitions, including:

- Top 5 at the American University in Cairo 2024 international case competition, in collaboration with the Boston Consulting Group in the fields of Management consulting and ESG principles for CIB Egypt.
- Top 10 at the L'Oréal Brandstorm 2024 regional competition in the field of innovations in the Cosmetics industry.
- Top 5 at the Creative Shock 2023 international case competition, organized by ISM University of Management and Economics in Vilnius, Lithuania.
- Top 10 at the Cesim Elite 2022 international business simulation competition.
