= Petar Petrović (Serbian politician, born 1951) =

Serbian politician

- Петар Петровић

Member of the National Assembly of the Republic of Serbia
- In office 14 February 2007 – 3 August 2020
- In office 22 January 2001 – 27 January 2004

Member of the Assembly of Serbia and Montenegro
- In office 25 February 2003 – 12 February 2004

Personal details
- Born: 2 October 1951 (age 75) Loćika, Rekovac, PR Serbia, FPR Yugoslavia
- Party: SKS (until 1990); SPS (1990–93); SSJ (1990s–2004); JS (since 2004)
- Education: University of Kragujevac

Petar Petrović (Serbian Cyrillic: Петар Петровић; born 2 October 1951) is a Serbian politician. He served in the Serbian parliament for most of the period from 2001 to 2020, originally as a member of the Party of Serbian Unity (SSJ) and later with United Serbia (JS). Petrović has also held high office at the city level in Jagodina.

== Early life and career ==
Petrović was born to family of farmers in the village of Loćika in the municipality of Rekovac, in what was then the People's Republic of Serbia in the Federal People's Republic of Yugoslavia. He has described his family as rising from poverty to become the wealthiest family in the village, owning a ten-hectare estate. He graduated from the University of Kragujevac Faculty of Law and later moved to Jagodina, where he worked in management with the cable manufacturing company Kablovi and was director of the public utility Standard.

== Politician ==
=== League of Communists and Socialist Party of Serbia ===
Petrović was recommended for membership in the League of Communists of Serbia (SKS) while serving in the Yugoslav People's Army (JNA). He was an active party member in the time of the Socialist Republic of Serbia, when the SKS was the only legally recognized party. After the re-introduction of multi-party politics in 1990, he became a member of the successor Socialist Party of Serbia (SPS). He left that party in 1993, due to what he described as "shady activities" taking place there.

=== Party of Serbian Unity ===
Petrović re-entered political life as a member of the Party of Serbian Unity, on the advice of fellow Jagodina politician Dragan Marković Palma. Of the SSJ's founder, the paramilitary leader Željko Ražnatović Arkan, Petrović later said, "regardless of the stories that followed him, [he] was good to all of us" and was "destined to be a leader."

Jagodina was the only electoral division that the SSJ contested in the 1997 Serbian parliamentary election. Petrović appeared in the second position on the party's electoral list, following Marković. The list did not cross the electoral threshold to win any mandates. The SSJ later moved its headquarters to Jagodina in 1998, due in part to its participation in the municipal government. After the assassination of Arkan in January 2000, Borislav Pelević became the party's leader.

Incumbent Yugoslavian president Slobodan Milošević fell from power after losing to Democratic Opposition of Serbia (DOS) candidate Vojislav Koštunica in the 2000 Yugoslavian presidential election. Serbia's government also fell after Milošević's defeat, and a new Serbian parliamentary election was called for December 2000. Prior to the vote, Serbia's electoral laws were changed such that the entire country became a single electoral division and all mandates were awarded to candidates on successful lists at the discretion of the sponsoring parties or coalitions, irrespective of numerical order. Petrović appeared in the fourth position on the SSJ's list and received a mandate after the list unexpectedly won fourteen seats. The DOS won a landslide victory, and the SSJ served in opposition for the parliament that followed. In his first term, Petrović was a member of the legislative committee, the administrative committee, and the committee on the judiciary and administration. He was by his own admission known for sharp insults directed toward government members in his first term, though he later said that he never attacked his opponents on a personal level.

The Federal Republic of Yugoslavia was officially reconstituted as the State Union of Serbia and Montenegro in February 2003, and the federal assembly of Serbia and Montenegro was established at the same time. The first delegates from Serbia were chosen by a form of indirect election, with each parliamentary group in the Serbian parliament allowed representation in the federal body proportional to its numbers. Only sitting members of the Serbian parliament or the Montenegrin parliament, or outgoing members of the Yugoslavian parliament, were eligible to serve. The SSJ was permitted five members in the federal assembly, and Petrović was included in the party's delegation. He also continued to serve in the Serbian parliament after his appointment.

The SSJ contested the 2003 Serbian parliamentary election at the head of a coalition called For National Unity. Petrović received the 163rd position on its list, which was mostly alphabetical. The list failed to cross the electoral threshold. Petrović stood down from both his republican and federal mandates when the new assemblies convened in early 2004.

=== United Serbia ===
==== 2004–2012 ====
The Party of Serbian Unity split in February 2004, and Marković and Petrović formed a breakaway group called United Serbia. Marković became the new party's leader.

Serbia introduced the direct election of mayors with the 2004 Serbian local elections. Marković was elected as mayor of Jagodina, and United Serbia also won a plurality victory in the municipal assembly election with sixteen out of forty-one seats. Petrović was elected to the assembly and served afterward on the municipal council (i.e., the executive branch of the local government).

United Serbia contested the 2007 parliamentary election on the coalition electoral list of the Democratic Party of Serbia (DSS) and New Serbia (NS), and Petrović appeared in the 199th position. The list won forty-seven seats, two of which were assigned to United Serbia members; Petrović was one of the JS candidates given a mandate. The DSS–NS alliance afterward formed a coalition government with the Democratic Party (DS) and G17 Plus, and Petrović served as a government supporter. In his second term, he was a member of the legislative committee and the committee on local self-government.

The governing coalition broke down in early 2008, and a new parliamentary election was called for May of that year. Prior to the vote, United Serbia joined the political coalition led by the Socialist Party of Serbia. Petrović appeared in the tenth position on the SPS's list and was awarded a mandate for a third term after the list won twenty seats. The overall results of the election were inconclusive, and the Socialists initially held coalition talks with the DSS and the Serbian Radical Party (SRS). These talks were not successful, and the SPS instead joined a coalition with the DS-led For a European Serbia (ZES) alliance. Notwithstanding its origins in Serbian nationalism, United Serbia favoured a coalition with ZES; this is believed to have influenced the Socialist Party's decision. When the ZES–SPS coalition was announced, Petrović commented with approval that a "pro-European government of Serbia [would] be formed very quickly." United Serbia was not actually part of the new government but provided vital support in the assembly. In the 2008–12 term, Petrović was a member of the industry committee, the legislative committee, the committee for culture and information, and the committee for European integration; a deputy member of the privatization committee; a member of Serbia's delegation to the Parliamentary Assembly of the Mediterranean; and a member of Serbia's parliamentary friendship group with Austria.

The direct election of mayors proved to be a short-lived experiment and was abandoned with the 2008 Serbian local elections, which were held concurrently with the parliamentary vote; since this time, mayors have been chosen by the elected members of the local assemblies. In 2008, a coalition led by United Serbia won a majority victory in Jagodina with nineteen out of thirty-one seats. Dragan Marković Palma was chosen for a new term as mayor, and Petrović was chosen as deputy mayor.

In 2010, Petrović condemned a ruling by the International Criminal Tribunal for the former Yugoslavia (ICTY) which found that two Bosnian Serb soldiers had displayed genocidal intent in the 1995 Srebrenica massacre. Petrović said, "The verdict just further strengthens JS's conviction that the ICTY is not a court in the true sense of the word, but [...] the extended arm of those powerful individuals who have decided to convict Serbs and the Serbian people for something they did not do." He was also said, "There was no genocide in Srebrenica ... There were crimes, and those who committed them should be held responsible."

Serbia's electoral system was reformed again in 2011, such that all parliamentary mandates were awarded to candidates on successful lists in numerical order.

Petrović stood down as deputy mayor of Jagodina in October 2011, after a ruling that he could not hold a dual mandate as a parliamentarian and a member of the city's executive.

==== 2012–2020 ====
United Serbia continued its alliance with the Socialist Party into the 2012 Serbian parliamentary election. Petrović received the twentieth position on the SPS coalition's list and was re-elected when the list won forty-four mandates. The Socialists formed a new coalition government with the Serbian Progressive Party (SNS) after the election, and United Serbia again provided parliamentary support for the administration. Petrović served as deputy leader of United Serbia's assembly group and was the chair of the justice committee, (Note: Formally known as the Committee on the Judiciary, Public Administration, and Local Self-Government.) a member of the administrative committee (Note: Formally known as the Committee on Administrative, Budgetary, Mandate, and Immunity Issues.) and the committee on constitutional and legislative issues, and a member of the parliamentary friendship groups with China and the United Kingdom.

United Serbia's coalition won twenty-two out of thirty-one seats in Jagodina in the 2012 Serbian local elections, which were held concurrently with the parliamentary vote. Petrović was re-elected to the local assembly and served afterward as deputy speaker, which was not inconsistent with his role as a parliamentarian.

Petrović was promoted to the fourteenth position on the SPS list in the 2014 parliamentary election and was re-elected when the list again won forty-four seats. The SNS and its allies won a landslide majority victory and afterward formed a new coalition government with the SPS; United Serbia once again provided outside support. Petrović again served as deputy leader of United Serbia's group, was chair of the judicial committee, and served on the administrative committee and the committee on constitutional and legislative issues. In this term, he was a member of the friendship groups with Brazil, China, and Italy.

In early 2015, the International Court of Justice (ICJ) dismissed mutual claims of genocide by Serbia and Croatia in the context of the 1991–95 Croatian war. Shortly before the ruling, Petrović predicted that Serbia would be acquitted while Croatia would at least be convicted of the expulsion of Krajina Serbs during Operation Storm. He also remarked, "However, we should not look back to the past. We in JS support the view of our government that we should not forget, but forgive certain things from the past, look to the future and establish good political and economic relations with Croatia as our neighbour."

Petrović was promoted again to the seventh position on the SPS list in the 2016 parliamentary election and was elected to a sixth term when the list won twenty-nine mandates. The SNS and its allies won another majority victory and formed a new coalition government including the SPS, and United Serbia again provided outside support. As before, Petrović served as deputy head of the United Serbia assembly group and chair of the judiciary committee, as well as being a member of the administrative committee, the committee on constitutional and legislative issues, and the friendship groups with Austria, Brazil, China, and Italy.

In the 2016 Serbian local elections, Petrović was given the second position on United Serbia's coalition list in Jagodina and was re-elected when the list won a third consecutive majority victory with twenty-one out of thirty-one seats. He once again served as deputy speaker in the term that followed.

Petrović was not a candidate in the 2020 Serbian parliamentary election or the 2020 Serbian local elections, and his term in the republican and local assemblies ended in that year.

== Since 2020 ==
In April 2021, opposition politician Marinika Tepić accused Dragan Marković Palma of organizing the prostitution of women and girls at a prominent nightclub in Jagodina. She added that eyewitnesses had named Petrović as a client of these services. An investigation was subsequently launched. Marković said that the accusations against him were "lies" and brought a lawsuit against Tepić in early 2022. The matter reached an impasse shortly thereafter and was never fully resolved. Marković died in 2024.
