= Miloslav Samardžić =

Serbian writer (born 1963)

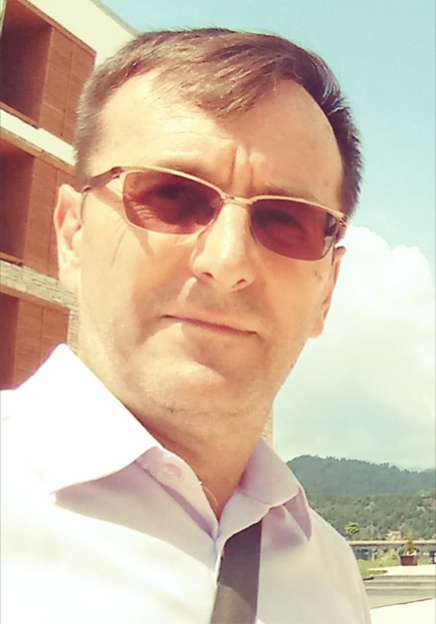
- Samardžić in 2019
- Born: 22 November 1963 (age 62); Aleksandrovac, SR Serbia, SFR Yugoslavia
- Education: University of Kragujevac Faculty of Economics
- Occupations: Journalist and author

Miloslav Samardžić (Serbian Cyrillic: Милослав Самарџић; born 22 November 1963) is a Serbian writer who writes about contemporary Serbian and Balkan history. He is the owner of the publishing house and former magazine Pogledi.

== Biography ==
Samardžić was born on 22 November 1963 in Aleksandrovac where he completed elementary and high school (studying journalism). He graduated from the University of Kragujevac Faculty of Economics in 1989 (the marketing program). As a student, he completed the Večernje novosti journalist school in 1984 and became a correspondent from Kragujevac for the newspaper. He arrived at Pogledi (then a student newspaper of the University of Kragujevac) in 1984. He left Večernje novosti in 1986 as they didn't publish his articles which were critical of the country's regime. At the end of 1985, he became the editor of the University section of Pogledi and he became the editor-in-chief in 1987. He remained the editor-in-chief until the magazine went defunct in 2005.

He published his first book while living in the Kragujevac university residence in 1989. From 1989, he began studying the history of the Second World War, especially the Royal Yugoslav Army and the Chetniks led by Draža Mihailović. He researched archival material in museums and archives mostly researching the documents of the Military Archive in Belgrade (the section of the archive dedicated to Chetnik history).

He is a member of the Association of Writers of Serbia.
