= Loćika =

Loćika may refer to:

- Loćika (Aleksinac), a village in Serbia
- Loćika (Rekovac), a village in Serbia
