= Belgrade High School =

Belgrade High School may refer to:

- Belgrade High School (Montana), United States
- Belgrade Higher School, Belgrade, Serbia, a 19th century Grande école
- List of educational institutions in Belgrade
