= University of Kragujevac, Faculty of Economics and Business =

Educational and scientific institute in Kragujevac, Serbia

University of Kragujevac Faculty of Economics
- Економски факултет Универзитета у Крагујевцу
- Type: Public
- Established: 1 October 1960; 65 years ago
- Academic affiliations: University of Kragujevac
- Dean: Milena Jakšić
- Academic staff: 72 (2023–24)
- Administrative staff: 41 (2013–14)
- Students: 1,861 (2023–24)
- Undergraduates: 1,566 (2023–24)
- Postgraduates: 245 (2023–24)
- Doctoral students: 50 (2023–24)
- Location: Kragujevac, Serbia; 44°01′23.9″N 20°55′21″E
- Campus: Urban
- Colors: Golden brown, blue, red
- Website: www.ekfak.kg.ac.rs

The Faculty of Economics and Business (FEB) of the University of Kragujevac is an educational and scientific institution in the city of Kragujevac. It was established as a department of the University of Belgrade Faculty of Economics on 1 October 1960 and became an independent higher education institution on 16 December 1975. Since its establishment, the FEB has striven to create an important position in the country and the region by educating economists, and managers, as well as through encouraging scientific work of its staff who conducted their research projects in the field of fundamental and applied research. With this aim, curricula have been improved for them to be aligned with the latest scientific and educational trends of the contemporary world. In 2009, The FEB fulfilled all the requirements of the new Serbian Law on Education and became a fully accredited higher education institution. All three levels of study are accredited: undergraduate, graduate and PhD.

The FEB employs about 80 teachers and associates. Up to now, around 9,200 students have graduated from the FEB, 133 have continued their studies successfully advancing to the Magisterium degree, around 420 acquired a master's degree, and 80 acquired a PhD degree. The FEB is organized through five departments – General Economics; Management and Business Economics; Accounting, Auditing and Business Finance; Finance, Finance Institutions and Insurance; Statistics and Informatics. There are also three centers – Center for Economic Research, Center for Publishing, and Center for Lifelong Learning, Student Counseling and Career Development.

The FEB and its Bachelor in Accounting and Business Finance study programme have held official accreditation from The Association of Chartered Certified Accountants (ACCA) since 2020. With the ACCA Accelerate programme students can combine their Bachelor in Accounting & Business Finance with the international ACCA qualification and kick off their successful career.

== Degree Programs ==
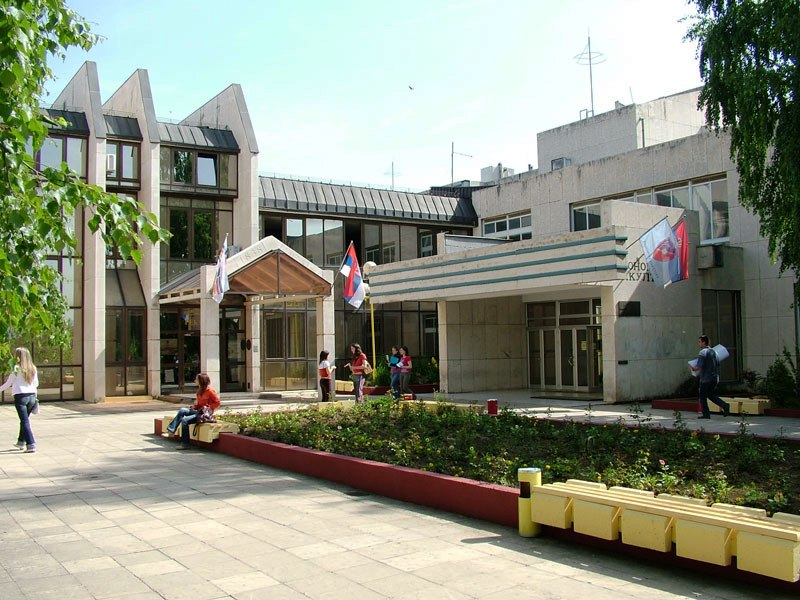
Faculty of Economics and Business building.

An important incentive to economic studies in Serbia reorganization was given by two TEMPUS Projects, both of which were led by the FEB. First TEMPUS was focused on the reorganization of the study of economics in Serbia, and second TEMPUS was focused on graduate studies in Serbia reorganization.

=== Undergraduate Study Programmes ===
The undergraduate studies at the FEB are structured across two study programmes:

1. Study programme Economics and Business Management is realized in Serbian and English language, and has the following six modules:

- Economic Policy and Development,
- International Economics and Business,
- Finance, Banking, and Insurance,
- Accounting and Business Finance,
- Marketing,
- Management, and
- Tourism and Hotel Industry Management.

2. Study programme Business Informatics is realized in Serbian language.

The duration of undergraduate studies for both study programmes is four years. For the admission on the undergraduate studies, students that have successfully finished four-year middle or high school can apply. Prospective candidates for admission then have to pass admissions exams in two courses of their choice. Candidates can choose among the following eight courses: General economics, Business Economics, National Economics, Statistics, Accounting, Philosophy, Sociology and Mathematics.

ACCA logo

In 2020 the FEB received an international accreditation for its undergraduate studies module Accounting and Business Finance from the British Association of Chartered Certified Accountants (ACCA) – the global professional accounting body offering the Chartered Certified Accountant qualification. ACCA has provided recognition of exams passed at the FEB and automatic exemption from seven ACCA exams for all students who complete their bachelor academic studies in the module Accounting and Business Finance starting in 2021. With this accreditation, the FEB received international confirmation of its efforts to improve the quality of studies and provide relevant and recognized knowledge by ACCA, as the most important institution in the field of education of accountants and auditors in the world. The ACCA reaccreditation has been secured in 2025.

=== Graduate Study programmes ===
The graduate studies at the FEB are structured across three study programmes:

1. Study programme Economics and Business Management is realized in Serbian language, and has the following ten modules:

- Economic Policy and Development,
- International Economics,
- Finance and Banking,
- Risk and Insurance,
- Accounting and Business Finance,
- Marketing,
- International Management, and
- Tourism Management,
- Innovations and Technological Entrepreneurship, and
- Public Sector Management.

2. Study programme Business Informatics is realized in Serbian language, and has the following two modules:

- Electronic Business and
- Artificial Intelligence in Business

3. Study programme Public Financial Management is realized in Serbian and English language.

For the admission on graduate studies can apply candidates that have successfully finished undergraduate studies and acquired at least 240 ECTS (European Credit Transfer and Accumulation System) points. Candidates that have graduated from economics, business or management faculties (colleges) are ranked only according to their success on undergraduate studies. Candidates that have graduated from other faculties have to pass two admission exams and are ranked according to their success on undergraduate studies and admission exam. Admissions exams that they have to pass depend on the graduate program they are interested in.

=== PhD Programmes ===
The PhD studies at the FEB are structured across one study programme with three modules:

- Macroeconomics,
- Business Management, and
- Accounting and Business Finance.

== Campus and facilities ==
Since 1981, the FEB uses a 7,570 square meter building (net useful area) containing well equipped classrooms, an amphitheater with 520 chairs, computer labs, a library, a book store, a student restaurant, student services, a post office, administrative offices, and offices for professors.

The library at the FEB includes about 50,000 volumes that cover domestic and foreign books, scientific monographs, primary and reference publications, manuals, domestic and foreign periodicals, Master theses, doctoral dissertations, specialist papers and student term papers. The FEB is subscribed to 62 domestic and 25 foreign scientific magazines. The Library also has a reading room accommodating 150 students. Book store at the Faculty of Law of the University of Kragujevac sells publications of the FEB.

Three computer rooms for Bachelor studies can accommodate around 100 students, and are used for classes in courses of E-Business, Information Systems, Information Technology, Operation Management etc. They can also be used by students after the classes, especially if they need to read publications available at the Academic Internet Network. FEB also has two computer rooms for Master and PhD students which can accommodate about 60 students, a classroom of the Center for Lifelong Learning, a video-conferencing room, as well as the student restaurant which can be used by students and teachers.

== Publications ==
Publishing Centre of the FEB was founded in 1998 as a separate organizational unit of the FEB. It publishes magazines, books, studies, monographs, practicums, etc. The mission of the centre is to make available to its customers superior knowledge and research results in the fields of theoretical economics, finance, banking, international economics, mathematics, business informatics, statistics, marketing, management, organization, tourism, business finance, accounting and other areas and discipline. It publishes the journal Economic Horizons, as well as the proceedings from three conferences regularly organized by the FEB - "Institutional Changes as a Determinant of Economic Development of Serbia", "Contemporary Issues in Economics, Business and Management", and "Accounting Knowledge as a Determinant of Economic and Social Progress". Centre annually publishes printed monograph with the papers written by the professors of the FEB.

Economic Horizons is a scientific journal that publishes the results of theoretically, methodologically, and applicatively valid research conducted in relevant areas of economics, business economics, and management. The papers published in the journal are double-blind reviewed, containing previously unpublished results of scientifically grounded, practically useful, and socially responsible research projects, conducted in key spheres of economics and management. The journal is categorized as a scientific journal of national significance on the list of the Ministry of Science, Technological Development and Innovation of the Republic of Serbia. The journal is also indexed in several scientific databases, including: Scopus (since October 2020), DOAJ (since March 2015), ProQuest - ABI/INFORM (since November 2013), Cabell's Directories (since October 2013), Index Copernicus (since September 2013), EconLit (since March 2013), EBSCO (since January 2013), and Ulrich's Periodicals Directory (since November 2012). The journal is published three times a year, in paper form and electronically, in Serbian and English. Journal's editor-in-chief is Professor Vladimir Mihajlović.

== International cooperation ==
The FEB has a highly developed co-operation with a large number of foreign universities and institutes. Among these institutions most notable are:

- University of Udine, Italy;
- University of Maribor, Slovenia;
- Kraków University of Economics, Poland;
- University for Information Technology and Management, Rzeszów, Poland;
- Modrzewski Kraków University College, Kraków, Poland;
- Comenius University, Bratislava, Slovakia;
- University of National and World Economy in Sofia, Bulgaria;
- University of Macedonia, Thessaloniki, Greece.

Numerous FEB teachers and associates are engaged by domestic institutes, faculties, consultant companies, and other clients, so contributing to their reputation and strengthening professional basis of the work they perform. Moreover, some of the professors are individually involved in important international projects confirming their personal reputation as well as that of the FEB.

== Alumni and teaching staff ==
- Professor Veroljub Dugalić, President of the management board of the Belgrade Stock Exchange (2003–2009), General Secretary of the Association of Serbian Banks (from 2003–2019) and Minister of Finance of the Federal Republic of Yugoslavia (2002-2003)
- Professor Živadin Stefanovic, Vice President of the Serbian Government (1989-1991)
- Rajko Ubiparip, Minister of Economy, Energy and Mining of Republika Srpska (2006-2008)
- Nebojša Divljan, chairman of the board and CEO of Delta Insurance and Delta Generali Insurance (1998-2011)
- Mateja Mijatović, Mayor of Raška District (2007-2014)
- Vladimir Jovanovic, Mayor of Prokuplje (2004-2008) and Deputy in Serbian Parliament (2012-2014)
- Miroslav Mišković, founder and owner of Delta Holding
- Zoran Todosijević, City of Cacak Secretary for Finance (1998–present)
- Miloslav Samardžić, writer and editor of magazine "Pogledi"

== Sport ==
Futsal club "KMF Ekonomac Kragujevac" was founded by Professor Veroljub Dugalic, several teaching assistants and a group of Faculty of Economics students on 7 November 2000. Following year, club has brought several new players and advanced to qualifications for Serbian national professional league. In 2004–05 club was third, in 2006–07-second and in 2007–08 first in Serbian national league. In 2008 club also won Balkan Cup. In the last eight seasons (2009/10, 2010/11, 2011/12, 2012/13, 2013/14, 2014/15, 2015/16 and 2016/17), Ekonomac was the champion of Serbia (first in Serbian national league). Ekonomac also won Serbian cup in 2013, 2014, 2017 and 2018.
