= List of universities in Serbia =

This is a list of universities in Serbia.

There are eighteen universities in Serbia, eight public and nine private universities. Apart from universities and faculties, there are also public and private colleges.

As of 2024–25 school year, there are 210,678 enrolled students at universities in Serbia, of whom 175,789 (83.4%) study at public universities and 34,889 (16.6%) at private universities. Also, there are 41,134 enrolled students at independent faculties and public and private colleges in Serbia.

== Public ==
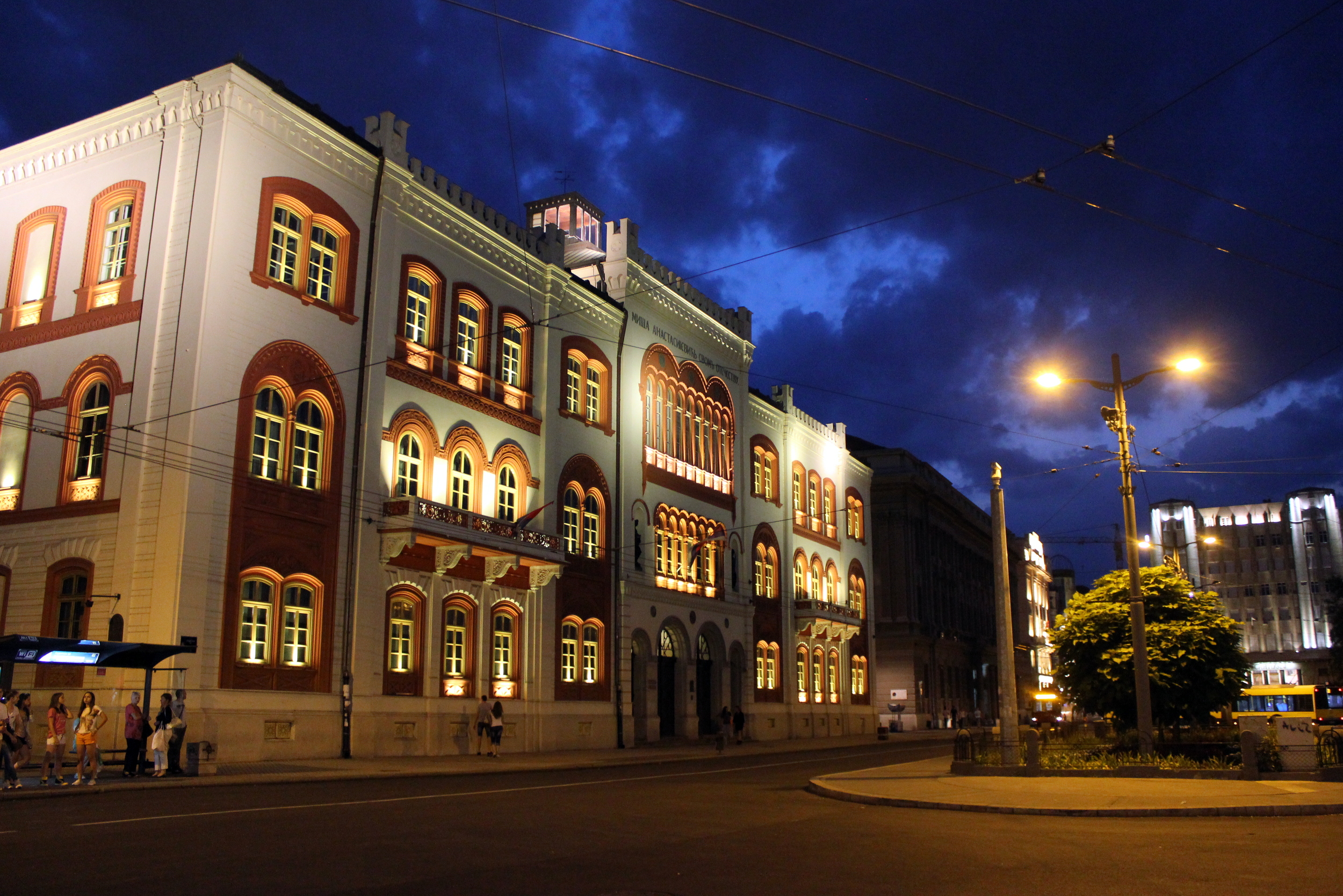
University of Belgrade

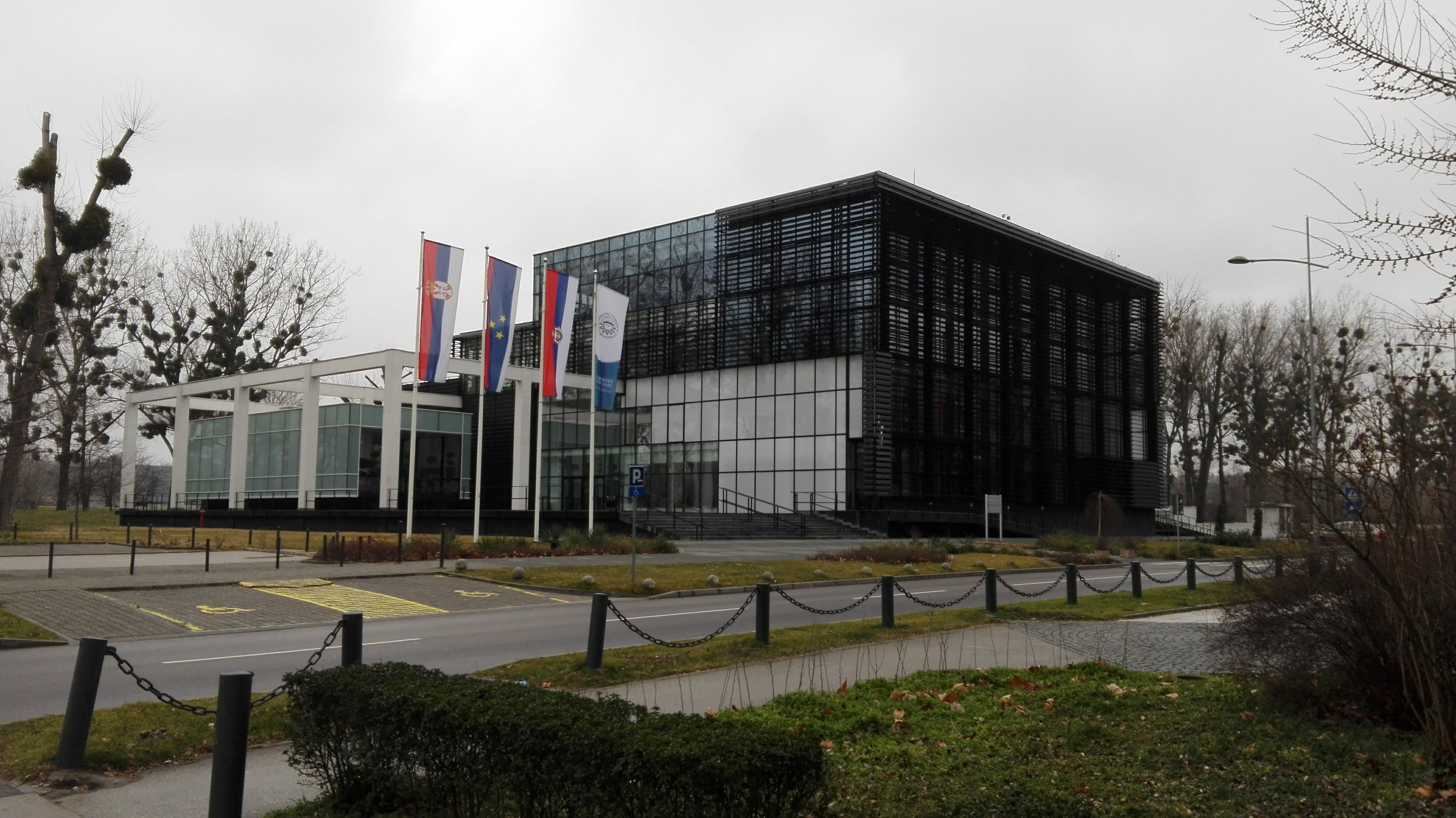
University of Novi Sad

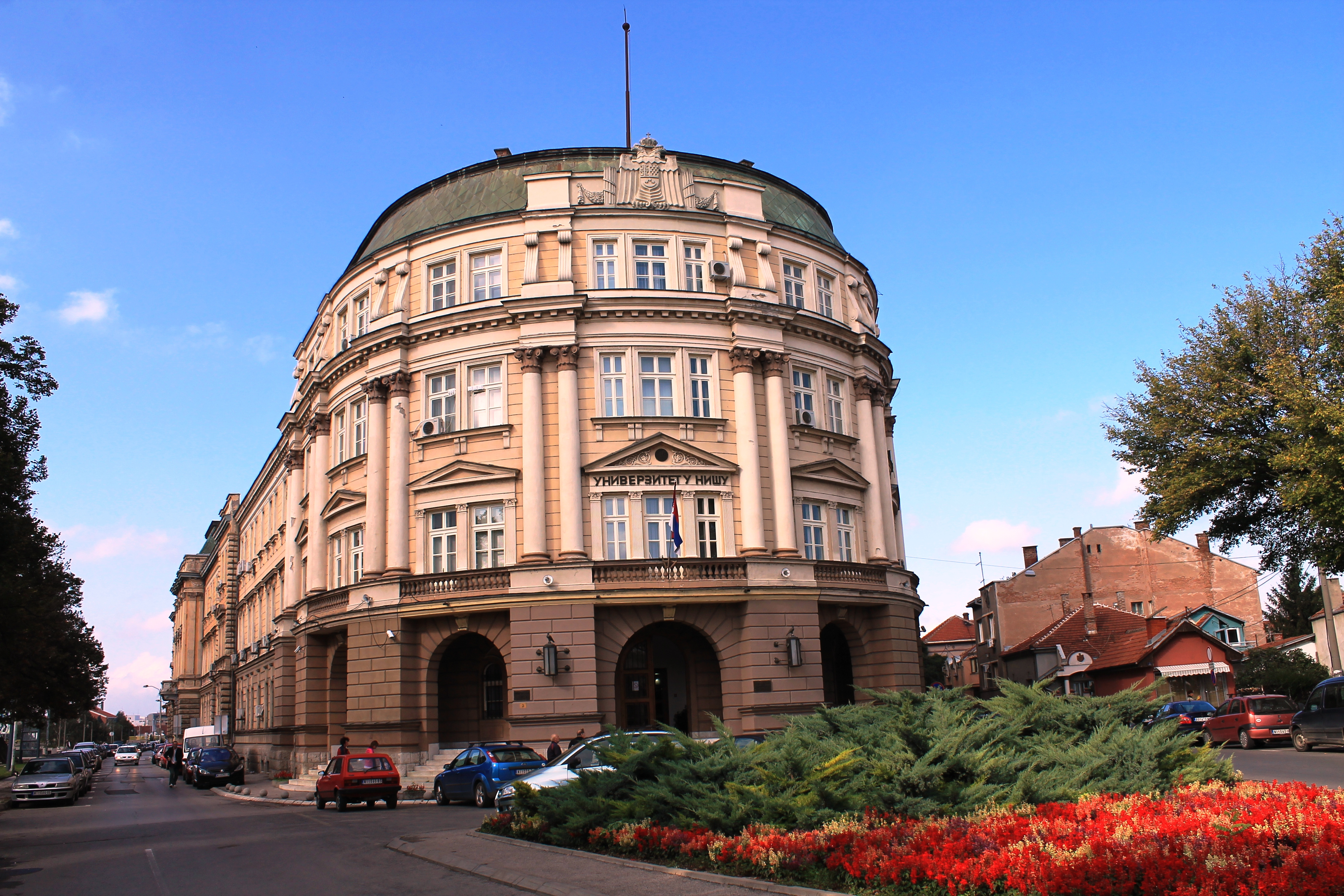
University of Niš

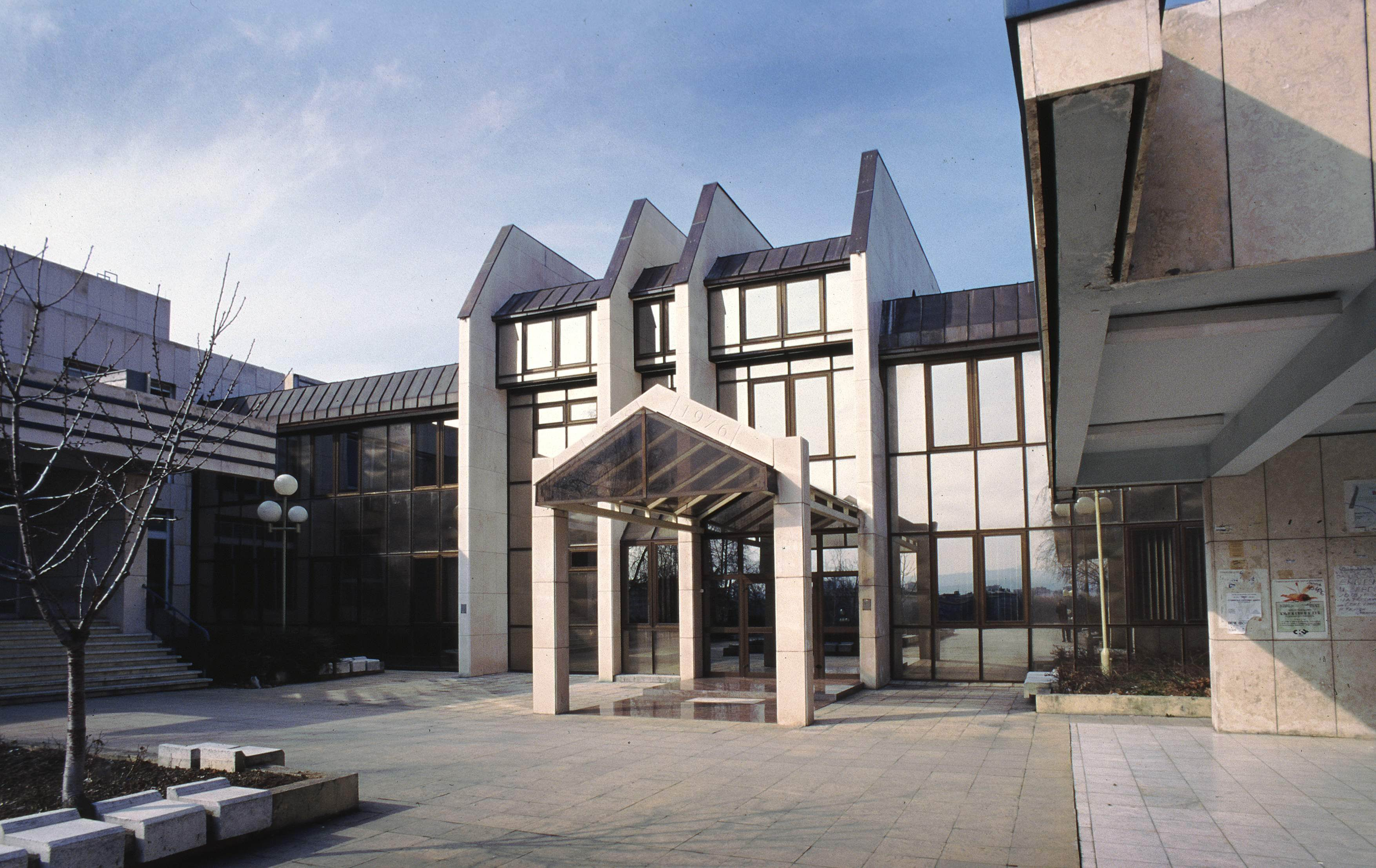
University of Kragujevac

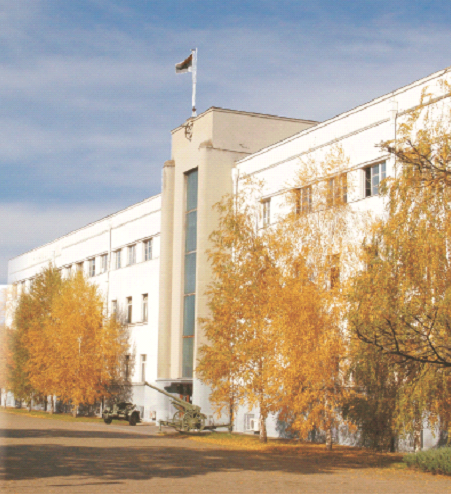
University of Defence

List of public universities and faculties that are funded through a budget of the Government of Serbia (excluding universities in Kosovo). Also, there is data about number of enrolled students as of 2024–25 school year.

Name	Native name	Location	Faculties	Founded	Enrolled students
University of Belgrade	Универзитет у Београду	Belgrade	32	1808	89,299
University of Novi Sad	Универзитет у Новом Саду	Novi Sad	15	1960	42,552
University of Niš	Универзитет у Нишу	Niš	14	1965	22,756
University of Kragujevac	Универзитет у Крагујевцу	Kragujevac	13	1976	13,996
University of Arts in Belgrade	Универзитет уметности у Београду	Belgrade	4	1957	2,811
State University of Novi Pazar	Државни универзитет у Новом Пазару	Novi Pazar	1	2006	2,616
University of Defence	Универзитет одбране у Београду	Belgrade	1	2011	1,035
University of Criminal and Police Studies	Криминалистичко-полицијски универзитет	Belgrade	1	1993	724

== Private ==
List of private universities in Serbia (excluding universities in Kosovo, with data about number of enrolled students as of 2024–25 school year.

Name	Native name	Location	Faculties	Founded	Enrolled students
Singidunum University	Универзитет Сингидунум	Belgrade	3	2005	8,574
Economics Academy	Универзитет Привредна Академија	Novi Sad	8	2000	7,596
Union–Nikola Tesla	Универзитет Унион–Никола Тесла	Belgrade	9	2005	4,388
Union University	Универзитет Унион	Belgrade	4	2005	3,788
Educons University	Универзитет Едуконс	Novi Sad	3	2002	2,109
Metropolitan University	Универзитет Метрополитан	Belgrade	3	2010	1,838
Alfa BK University	Алфа БК универзитет	Belgrade	2	1993	1,202
International University of Novi Pazar	Интернационални Универзитет	Novi Pazar	1	2002	1,022
University MB	Универзитет „МБ“	Belgrade	1	2002	393

== See also ==
- List of universities in Kosovo
- List of universities in Montenegro
- Education in Serbia
