= University of Defence =

Public university in Serbia

- Универзитет одбране
- Type: Public
- Established: 24 February 2011; 15 years ago
- Rector: Brigadier general Boban Đorović
- Academic staff: 502 (2018–19)
- Students: 885 (2018–19)
- Undergraduates: 827 (2018–19)
- Postgraduates: 38 (2018–19)
- Doctoral students: 20 (2018–19)
- Location: Belgrade, Serbia; 44.769832°N 20.469847°E
- Campus: Urban
- Colors
- Website: www.uo.mod.gov.rs

The University of Defence (Serbian: Универзитет одбране, romanized: Univerzitet odbrane) is a public university in Serbia. It was founded by the decree of the Government of Serbia in 2011, and consists of one faculty with the headquarters in Belgrade.

It comprises one faculty and offers academic programs at the undergraduate, graduate, and doctoral levels in various scientific fields, within the educational and scientific domains of social sciences, engineering and technology, and medical sciences.

== History ==
The University of Defense was founded by the Serbian government on February 24, 2011. It is an independent higher education institution that conducts higher military education through undergraduate, graduate, and doctoral studies across multiple scientific fields, in accordance with its founding documents, the Law on Higher Education, and the Law on Military Education.

Within the framework of higher education activities, the University of Defense also conducts scientific research, including basic, applied, and developmental research, aimed at advancing and modernizing education in the defense system. It is a member of the Conference of Universities of Serbia.

== Organisation ==
The University consists of two schools:

- Military Academy (Serbian: Војна академија)
- Medical School of Military Medical Academy (Serbian: Медицински факултет Војномедицинске академијe)

== See also ==
- Education in Serbia
- List of universities in Serbia
