= Pogledi =

Serbian magazine

- Type: Political magazine
- Publisher: NIP Pogledi
- Editor: Miloslav Samardžić
- Founded: 1982
- Ceased publication: 2005
- Language: Serbian in the Cyrillic alphabet
- Headquarters: Kragujevac, Serbia
- Circulation: 200,000 (1990)
- Website: pogledi.rs

Pogledi (Serbian Cyrillic: Погледи, meaning Viewpoints in English) was a Serbia-based magazine devoted to politics and history, published biweekly. Pogledi was the first opposition magazine in communist Yugoslavia. In total, 268 issues were published.

== History ==
In June 1982, Pogledi began as a student magazine at the University of Kragujevac. It was the brainchild of Miloslav Samardžić. The first issue was about Josip Broz Tito. The magazine made national headlines on 1 March 1989 when it was the first media outlet in Serbia to publish that President Harry S. Truman posthumously awarded Draža Mihailović the Legion of Merit. In 1990, Pogledi became the most read magazine in the country with a circulation of 200,000. That same year Pogledi split from the university and became an independent publishing house.

Vuk Drašković gave his first ever interview to Pogledi in 1986. Prior to their deaths in 1991, Đorđe "Giška" Božović and Vukašin Šoškoćanin gave their last interviews to Pogledi.

== Notable contributors ==
Some of the magazine's contributors were Vidosav Stevanović, Veran Matić, Kosta Čavoški, Nikola Milošević, Srđa Trifković, Dejan Stojanović, Simo Dubajić, Momčilo Đujić, Isidora Bjelica, Biljana Srbljanović, Vanja Bulić, Radomir Mihailović, Dragoš Kalajić, Dragoslav Bokan, Momo Kapor, Prvoslav Vujčić, Danko Popović, Milić of Mačva and Zoran Stefanović.
