= International University of Novi Pazar =

University in Novi Pazar, Serbia

- Интернационални универзитет у Новом Пазару; Internacionalni univerzitet u Novom Pazaru
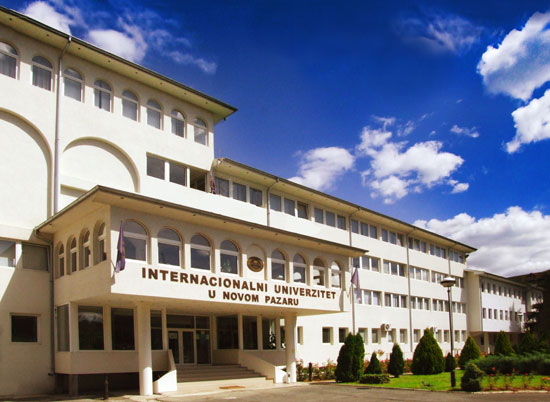
- Type: Private
- Established: March 30, 2002; 24 years ago
- Founders: Muamer Zukorlić
- Rector: Suad Bećirović
- Academic staff: 115 (2023–24)
- Students: 777 (2023–24)
- Undergraduates: 696 (2023–24)
- Postgraduates: 81 (2023–24)
- Location: Ul. Dimitrija Tucovića 65, 36300, Novi Pazar, Serbia; 43°09′22″N 20°31′51″E
- Language: Serbian, Bosnian
- Website: www.uninp.edu.rs

The International University of Novi Pazar (Serbian: Интернационални универзитет у Новом Пазару; Bosnian: Internacionalni univerzitet u Novom Pazaru, UNINP) is a private university founded in 2002 in Novi Pazar, Serbia as a charitable endowment (wakf) by Muamer Zukorlić.

== History ==
Founded as the University of Novi Pazar, The university consists of four departments with 15 courses. The position of President of the University was held by Muamer Zukorlić until September 2016. The Rector of the University is Suad Bećirević. The university's anniversary is on 30 March.

It is the first university in Serbia to begin operating under the Bologna declaration, as well as the only university managed by the charitable foundation on the Balkans.

In 2006, a dispute arose with the state university of the same name, which was founded in Novi Pazar that same year and used the same name, which the University of Novi Pazar added the prefix “International”.

In April 2009, Muamer Zukorlić awarded the first honorary doctorate in international relations and diplomacy to Jelko Kacin, a Slovenian Member of the European Parliament.

== Organisation ==
The university comprises four departments, namely:

1. Department of Legal Sciences
2. Department of Economic and Computer Sciences
3. Department of Educational and Psychological Sciences
4. Department of Arts and Philological Sciences

The university also organises postgraduate studies at master's and doctoral levels.

== See also ==
- Education in Serbia
- List of universities in Serbia
