= University of Kragujevac Faculty of Technical Sciences =

- Факултет техничких наука Универзитета у Крагујевцу
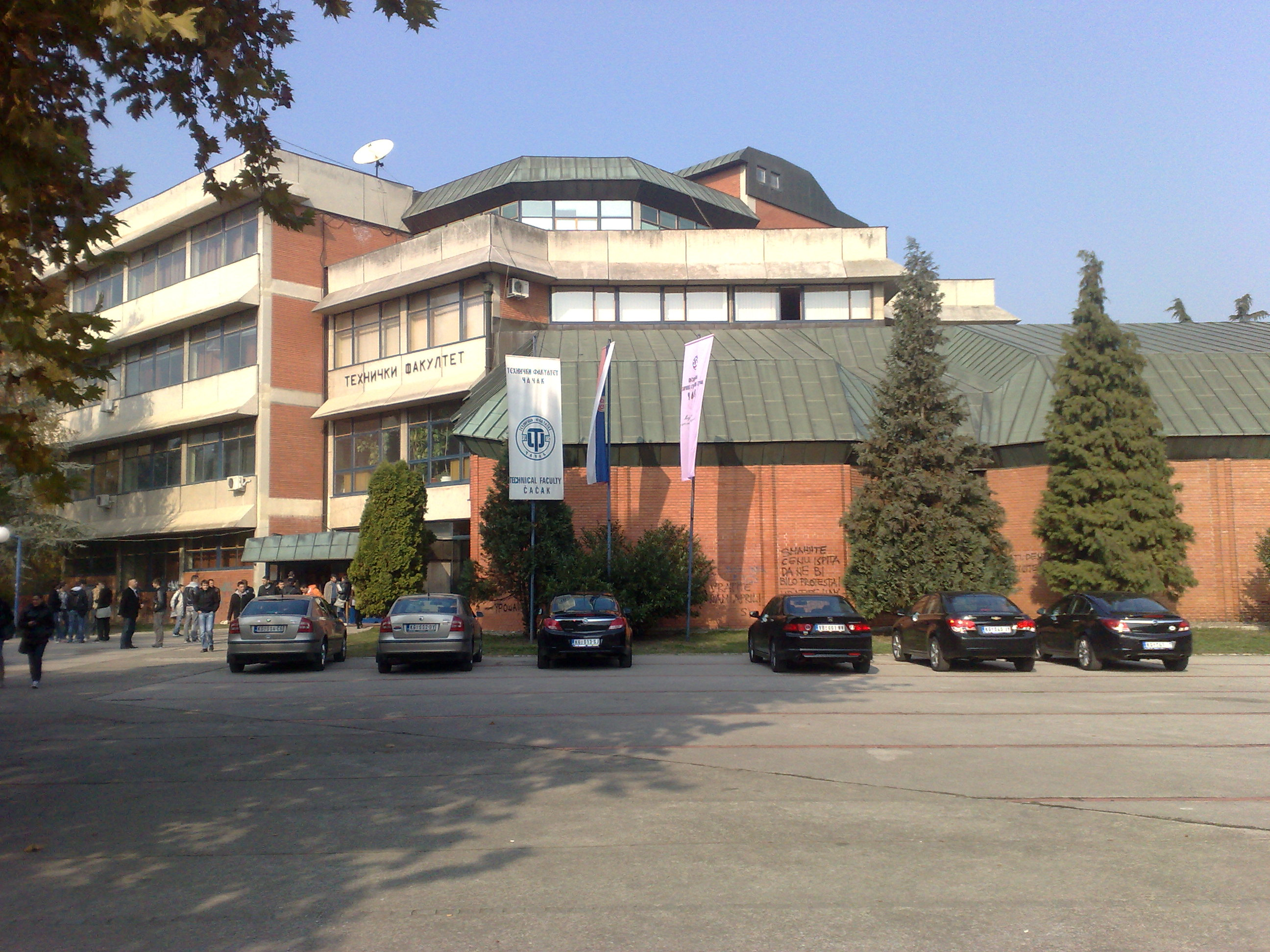
- Faculty of Technical Sciences Building
- Former names: Pedagogical-Technical Faculty (1975–1986); Technical Faculty (1986–2012)
- Type: Public
- Established: 18 November 1975; 50 years ago
- Affiliations: University of Kragujevac
- Dean: Ivan Milićević
- Faculty: 107 (2023–24)
- Administrative staff: 36 (2016–17)
- Students: 2,078 (2023–24)
- Undergraduates: 1,731 (2023–24)
- Postgraduates: 289 (2023–24)
- Doctoral students: 58 (2023–24)
- Location: Svetog Save 65, Čačak, Serbia; 43.897088°N 20.344824°E
- Campus: Urban
- Website: www.ftn.kg.ac.rs

The Faculty of Technical Sciences^{[a]} (abbr. FTN; Serbian: Факултет техничких наука Универзитета у Крагујевцу, romanized: Fakultet tehničkih nauka Univerziteta u Kragujevcu) in Čačak is an independent department of the University of Kragujevac. Founded in 1975, the school nowadays offers academic and undergraduate studies, master's degree studies, doctoral and specialist undergraduate studies. The faculty's programs cover electrical engineering, computer engineering, mechatronics, information technology, informatics and management. besides that, the faculty offers the vocational studies as well.

== History ==
The institution was established as Pedagogical-Technical Faculty with the assignment of developing teachers of mechanical and electrical engineering, and technical education.

The faculty was founded on 18 November 1975. In 1982, the faculty extended the field of its activity by the admission of graduates to BSc in mechanical and electrical engineering. Since 1986, the faculty has been operating under the name of Technical Faculty, and has pursued its work under the name ever since. The studies that were held at the faculty were: electrical engineering (industrial energetics), electrical engineering (power systems), mechanical engineering, electrical and technical education. In 1998, the Post-Secondary School of Technical Education dissociated from the faculty.

Because of the significance of computing and informatics in the modern world, and their close relation to other technical fields, new teaching groups were introduced into the teaching program of the Technical Faculty in academic year 1992–93. The studies leading to the following degrees were introduced: electrical engineering (mechatronics) and technics and informatics. This was particularly justified in the academic year 1998–99 by introduction of the department that offered undergraduate studies in computer engineering and industrial management.

On 15 October 2012, the faculty officially changed its name to Faculty of Technical Sciences. The name changing was followed by a significant increase in the activities of this higher education institution as well as expanding the spectrum in the field of scientific research. In June 2020, the Science Technology Park in Čačak was opened, with the faculty being its co-founder. Two months later, in August 2020, the Government of Serbia formally closed the "Higher School of Technical Sciences" (providing vocational studies) and merged it with the faculty, as part of wider reform of higher education in Serbia.

== Departments ==
The faculty has a total of ten departments:

- Department of Computer and Software Engineering
- Department of Electrical Engineering
- Department of Entrepreneurship Management
- Department of Industrial Management
- Department of Information Technologies
- Department of Mechanical Engineering
- Department of Mechatronics
- Department of Physics and materials
- Department of Power Engineering
- Department of Technical and Pedagogy Education

== See also ==
- University of Kragujevac
