= Metropolitan University (Belgrade) =

Private university in Belgrade, Serbia

- Univerzitet Metropolitan
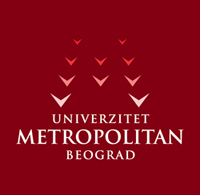
- Motto: Student at the center of attention
- Type: Private
- Established: 2010; 16 years ago
- President: Dragan Domazet
- Rector: Mitar Marinović
- Academic staff: 184 (2023–24)
- Students: 2,053 (2023–24)
- Undergraduates: 1,947 (2023–24)
- Postgraduates: 87 (2023–24)
- Doctoral students: 19 (2023–24)
- Location: Belgrade, Serbia; 44°49′50.1″N 20°27′18.7″E
- Language: Serbian, English
- Colours: Maroon, white
- Website: www.metropolitan.ac.rs

The Metropolitan University is a private-owned university located in Belgrade, Serbia. The university came as the join of the Faculty of Information Technology (FIT) (founded in 2005) and other governing departments of the university in 2010, which previously existed as an individual institution. As of 2023–24 academic year, it has 2,053 students and 184 academic staff.

The founder and rector, Dragan Domazet, was the Minister of Science of the Republic of Serbia from 2001 to 2004.

== Faculties ==
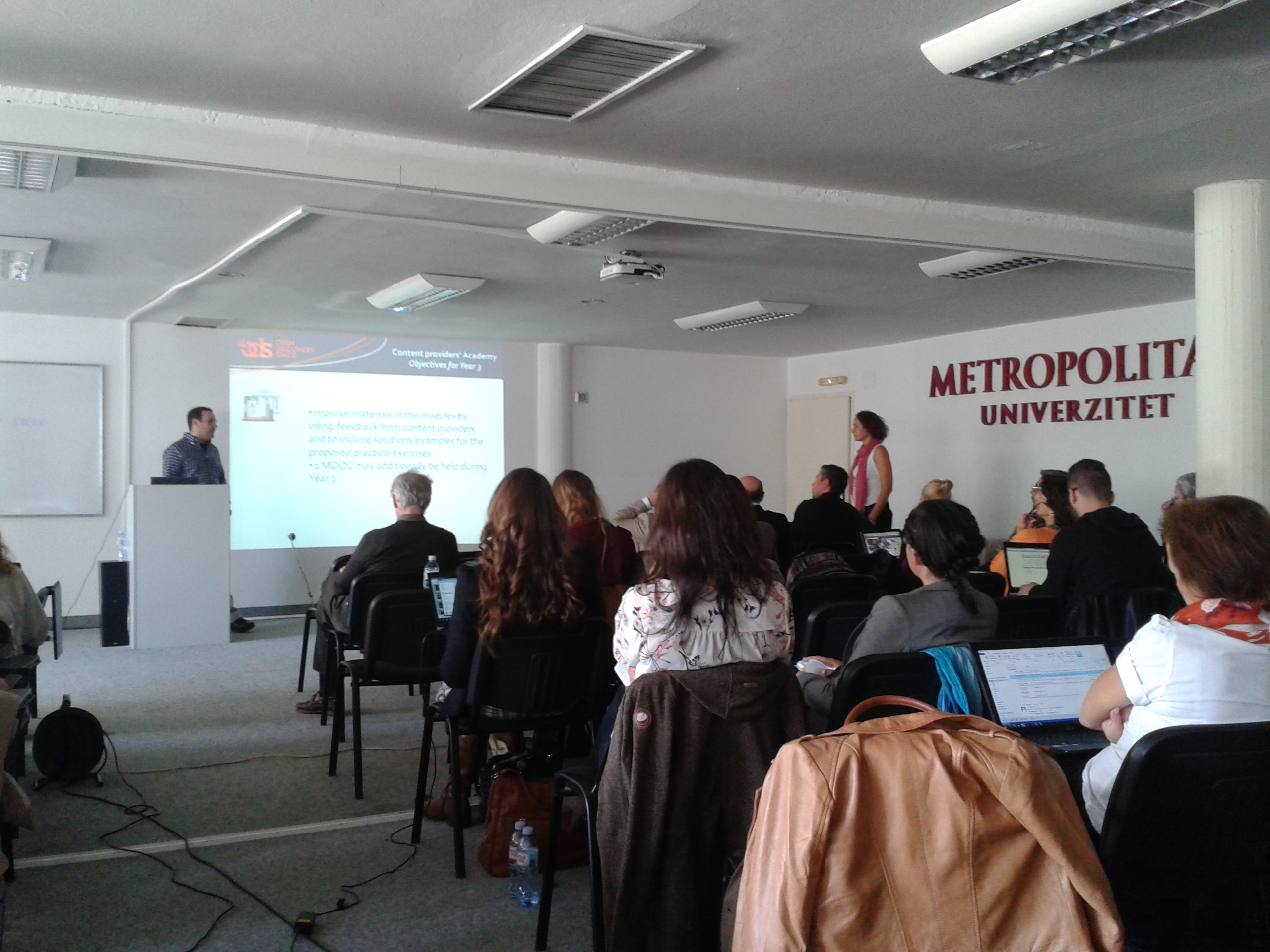
Rector speaking in a conference

As of 2023–24 academic year, the university consist of three faculties:

Faculty	Academic staff	Students
Information Technology, Management, and Digital Arts	107	1,557
FEFA	43	402
Applied Ecology "Futura"	34	94

== See also ==
- Education in Serbia
- List of universities in Serbia
