= Singidunum University =

Private university in Belgrade, Serbia

- Универзитет Сингидунум; Univerzitet Singidunum
- Type: Private
- Established: 28 June 1999; 27 years ago
- President: Milovan Stanišić
- Rector: Goranka Knežević
- Academic staff: 391 (2023–24)
- Students: 9,330 (2023–24)
- Undergraduates: 8,626 (2023–24)
- Postgraduates: 656 (2023–24)
- Doctoral students: 48 (2023–24)
- Location: Belgrade, Serbia; 44°46′55.8″N 20°28′44.9″E
- Website: singidunum.ac.rs

University rankings

Regional – Overall
- QS Emerging Europe and Central Asia: 351-400 (2022)

Singidunum University (Serbian: Универзитет Сингидунум, romanized: Univerzitet Singidunum) is a private university in Belgrade, Serbia which offers undergraduate, master and doctoral academics studies in three scientific fields – social sciences and humanities; technical sciences; and natural sciences and mathematics. As of 2023–24 academic year, the university consists of three faculties, has 391 academic staff and 9,330 enrolled students, which makes it the largest private university in Serbia.

The first faculty was founded in 1999, and the university itself was established on 17 January 2005. The university is organized according to the principles of the Bologna Declaration (Bologna Process) education model, and it applies the European Credit Transfer System (ECTS). The curricula and study programmes were designed in line with respectable European universities and colleges models, whilst relying on Serbian education system best practices.

== Organization ==
=== Faculties ===
As of 2023–24 academic year, the university consists of three faculties (some of them are legally integrated):

Faculty	Location	Academic staff	Students
Business, Informatics and Computer Science, Tourism and Hotel Management, Physical Culture and Sports Management, Technology	Belgrade	168	6,466
Media and Communication (FMK)	Belgrade	88	2,452
Health and Business Studies (FZPP)	Valjevo	135	412

=== Integrated faculties ===
- Faculty of Business in Belgrade
- Faculty of Tourism and Hospitality Management
- Faculty of Informatics and Computing
- Faculty of Technical Sciences
- Faculty of Physical Education and Sports Management
- Anglistics
- Environment and sustainable development studies
- Pharmacy studies
- Singidunum Center Novi Sad
- Singidunum Center Nis

=== Faculties with special legal entities status ===
- Faculty of Health, Legal and Business Studies in Valjevo (FZPP)
- Faculty of Media and Communications (FMK)

Singidunum University Institute, as a part of the integrated university, is dedicated to scientific research, participation in Erasmus+ programmes and international projects.

== Studies ==
Singidunum University was accredited by the Commission for Accreditation and Quality Assurance for the study programmes.

Academic studies of the following levels are realized:

- Bachelor studies, duration – four years
- Master studies, duration – one to two years
- Doctorate studies, duration – three years

== Study in English ==
Singidunum University has accredited undergraduate, master's and doctoral degree programs in English. The complete study programs are taught in English, which allows students to easily fit into the contemporary business environment or to continue their studies at well-known universities all over the world. Thanks to special cooperation agreements, students of Singidunum University can continue their education at Franklin University, Herzing University and the Russian Presidential Academy in St. Petersburg.

== Management ==
Name:	Position:
Prof. Milovan Stanišić, PhD	President
Prof. Goranka Knežević, PhD	Rector
Prof. Nemanja Stanišić, PhD	Vice president
Prof. Nebojša Bačanin Džakula, PhD	Vice-rector for science
Prof. Dragan Cvetković, PhD	Vice-rector for teaching
Prof. Milan Tuba, PhD	Vice-rector for international affairs
Prof. Lidija Barjaktarević, PhD	Dean, Faculty of Business
Prof. Miroslav Knežević, PhD	Dean, Faculty of Tourism and Hospitality Management
Prof. Mladen Veinović, PhD	Dean, Faculty of Informatics and Computing
Prof. Marko Tanasković, PhD	Dean, Faculty of Technical Sciences
Prof. Nenad Trunić, PhD	Dean, Faculty of Physical Education and Sports Management
Prof. Miroslav Popović, PhD	Dean, Environment and sustainable development studies
Prof. Olivera Nikolić, PhD	President, Faculty of Health, Legal and Business Studies in Valjevo
Prof. Nada Perišić, PhD	President, Faculty of Media and Communications
Prof. Miško Šuvaković, PhD	Dean, Faculty of Media and Communications
Prof. Ana Jovancai Stakić, PhD	International Academic Programmes Coordinator

All activities of Singidunum University are regulated by internal governing bodies: the University Council, the Rector’s Collegium, the University Senate and the Elective Council.

== Infrastructure ==
The university has 20,000 m^{2} of high-quality space, equipped with modern computer and internet infrastructure, audiovisual and other equipment necessary for efficient educational activities: 20 amphitheatres, 50 lecture halls, and 14 computer rooms. Internet access is available in the entire area of Singidunum University, where the centre for foreign languages, the library, offices for consultations, a bank and a student café are located as well.

The Student Service of Singidunum University represents an info centre where students can get information regarding the studies and other activities at the university.

Career Center provides assistance to students in developing skills for effective and efficient job search through specific individual and group counselling programs.

Students are actively involved in the work of the university through the Student Parliament and the President of the Student Parliament.

== Publishing ==
Singidunum University has developed its own university press. All textbooks and manuals for scientific disciplines included in the curricula are published within the university.

The university also publishes scientific journal, The European Journal of Applied Economics. The Ministry of Education and Science of the Republic of Serbia has ranked it, in the latest classification, as the top journal of national importance (M51). The journal is published twice a year and it is dedicated to scientific papers in the field of economics, management, tourism, information technology and law. The journal is available in electronic format on the portal www.journal.singidunum.ac.rs.

== Certificates ==
Various internationally recognized certificates can be acquired at Singidunum University, such as:

- IBM
- European Computer Driving Licence
- ORACLE
- Cisco
- SAP
- Micros Fidelio
- Galileo
- Amadeus
- Sybase
- EMC2
- Pantheon
- Certiport

Within the Centre for Foreign Languages at Singidunum University, the following certificates can be obtained:

- ESOL Certificate in English, in cooperation with the British Council
- DELE Certificate in Spanish, in cooperation with the Cervantes Institute
- PLIDA Certificate in Italian, in cooperation with the Dante Alighieri Society

== International cooperation ==
Singidunum University has developed successful cooperation with educational institutions worldwide.

Current collaborating institutions:

- IMC University of Applied Sciences Krems, Austria
- University of Cambridge, UK
- Huron University, UK
- Bocconi University, Italy
- Ca' Foscari University, Italy
- University of Bologna, Italy
- University of the Balearic Islands, Spain
- Corvinus University, Hungary
- University of Primorska, Slovenia
- Sinergija University, Bosnia and Herzegovina
- University of Banja Luka, Bosnia and Herzegovina
- University Mediteran, Montenegro
- Franklin University, Herzing University
- North West Institute of Management of the Russian Presidential Academy from St. Petersburg

== Additional information ==
The university is also a member of Conference of Universities of Serbia (Konferencija univerziteta Srbije - KONUS), Association of Universities of Serbia (Zajednica univerziteta Srbije - ZUS), an associate member of the World Tourism Organization UNWTO and a winner of several IT Globus awards.

== See also ==
- Education in Serbia
- List of universities in Serbia
