= Union University (Serbia) =

University in Belgrade, Serbia

- Универзитет Унион; Univerzitet Union
- Type: Private
- Established: 21 June 2005; 21 years ago
- Rector: Gordana Vukelić
- Academic staff: 192 (2023–24)
- Students: 3,616 (2023–24)
- Undergraduates: 3,134 (2023–24)
- Postgraduates: 431 (2023–24)
- Doctoral students: 51 (2023–24)
- Location: Belgrade, Serbia; 44°49′18″N 20°27′46.6″E
- Website: union.edu.rs

Union University (Универзитет Унион) is a higher education institution with headquarters in Belgrade, Serbia. Founded on 21 June 2005, it has 3,616 enrolled students as of 2023–24 academic year, which makes it the fifth largest private university in Serbia.

== Faculties ==
Union University consists of four faculties (number of enrolled students as of 2023–24 academic year):

Faculty	Native name	Location	Founded	Enrolled students
Faculty of Law and Business Studies dr Lazar Vrkatić	Факултет за правне и пословне студије "др Лазар Вркатић"	Novi Sad	2006	1,703
Faculty of Computing	Рачунарски факултет	Belgrade	2003	1,041
Faculty of Law	Правни факултет	Belgrade	2001	583
Belgrade Banking Academy	Београдска банкарска академија	Belgrade	2004	289

== See also ==
- Education in Serbia
- List of universities in Serbia
