= State University of Novi Pazar =

Public university in Novi Pazar, Serbia

- Државни Универзитет у Новом Пазару
- The seal of State University of Novi Pazar
- Type: Public
- Established: 2006; 20 years ago
- Affiliations: EUA
- Budget: €4.18 million (2020, planned; public funding)
- Rector: Zana Doličanin
- Faculty: 182 (2023–24)
- Students: 2,681 (2023–24)
- Undergraduates: 2,087 (2023–24)
- Postgraduates: 589 (2023–24)
- Doctoral students: 5 (2023–24)
- Location: Novi Pazar, Serbia; 43°08′18″N 20°31′16″E
- Campus: Urban
- Website: www.np.ac.rs

The State University of Novi Pazar (Serbian: Државни Универзитет у Новом Пазару, romanized: Državni Univerzitet u Novom Pazaru) is a public university in Serbia. It was founded in 2006 and has one faculty with headquarters in Novi Pazar.

== Organization and academics ==
The State University of Novi Pazar is governed by the University Council, University Senate and the Rector, who represents the university externally. As of 2018, it has 16 study programs and several departments.

The State University of Novi Pazar is an accredited degree-granting institution, offering bachelor's, master's and doctoral programs in Law, Economics, Serbian Literature and Language, English Language and Literature, Psychology, Mathematics, Mathematics and Physics, Computer Science and Mathematics, Computer Science and Physics, Architecture, Civil Engineering, Computer Technology, Audio and Video Technology, Chemistry, Agricultural Production, Food Processing Technology, Biology, Sports and Physical Education, Rehabilitation, and Fine Arts.

As of 2023–24 academic year, together with the International University of Novi Pazar, there are 3,458 students in Novi Pazar.

== Campus ==
The main building is located in Vuk Karadžić Street, Novi Pazar. The Painting Studio is in a separate building. The university also conducts its activities at the Hospital for Muscular and Neuromuscular Diseases and the Novi Pazar Sport Center (pool, sports hall and sport courts).

== See also ==
- Education in Serbia
- List of universities in Serbia
