= Loćika (Rekovac) =

- Village
- Location within Serbia
- Coordinates: 43°51′31″N 21°11′15″E
- Country: Serbia
- District: Pomoravlje District
- Municipality: Rekovac

Population (2002)
  - Total: 519
- Time zone: UTC+1 (CET)
  - Summer (DST): UTC+2 (CEST)

Loćika is a village in the municipality of Rekovac, Serbia. According to the 2002 census, the village has a population of 519 people.
