= University of Kragujevac =

University in Serbia

- Универзитет у Крагујевцу; Univerzitet u Kragujevcu
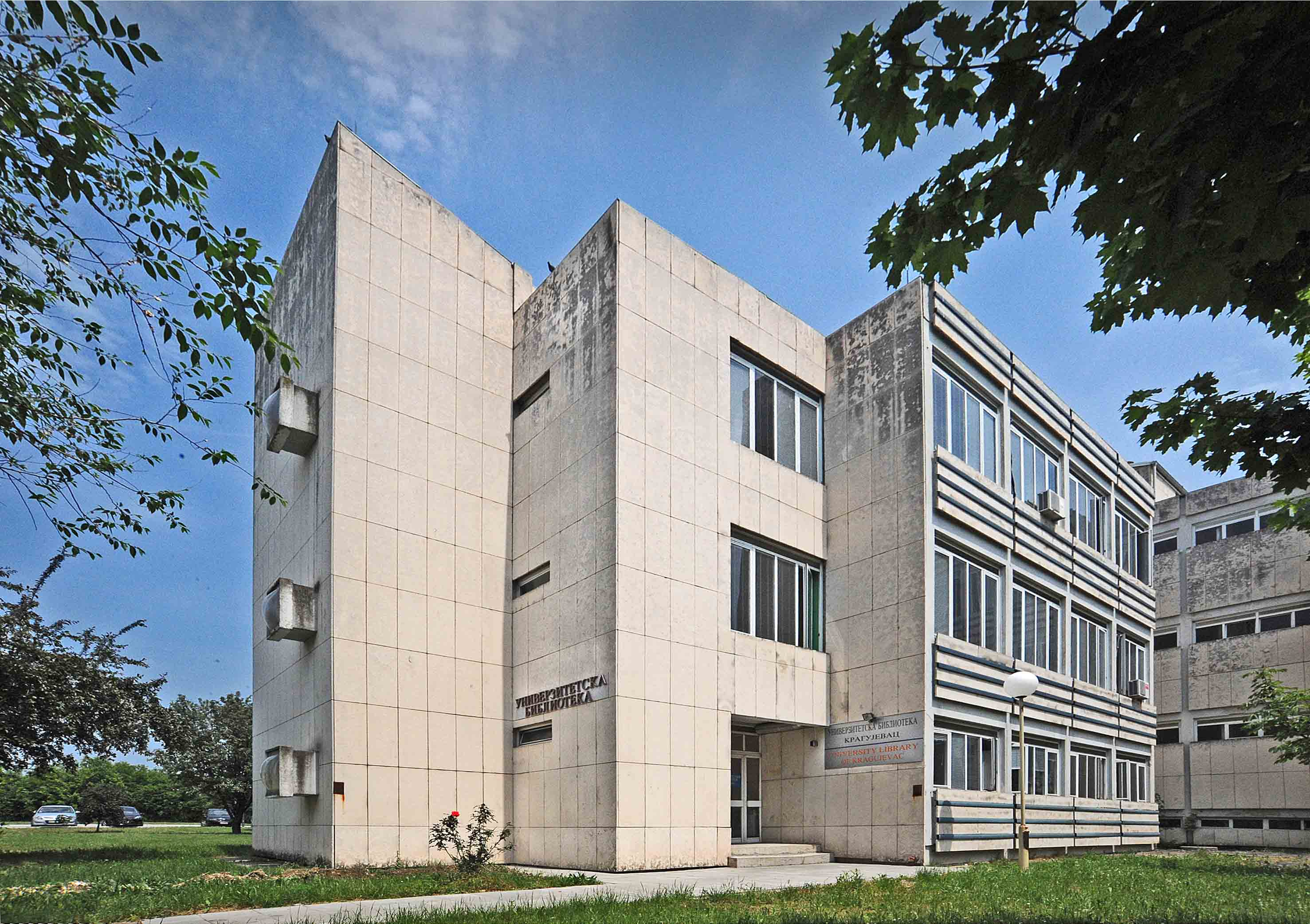
- Type: Public
- Established: 21 May 1976; 50 years ago
- Affiliations: EUA; Erasmus; TEMPUS
- Religious affiliation: secular school
- Budget: €28.11 million (2020, planned; public funding)
- Rector: Vladimir Ranković (2024–27)
- Academic staff: 1,244 (2023–24)
- Students: 15,202 (2023–24)
- Undergraduates: 12,124 (2023–24)
- Postgraduates: 2,282 (2023–24)
- Doctoral students: 904 (2023–24)
- Location: Kragujevac, Serbia; 44°01′24.3″N 20°55′19.1″E
- Campus: Urban
Colors
- Website: www.kg.ac.rs
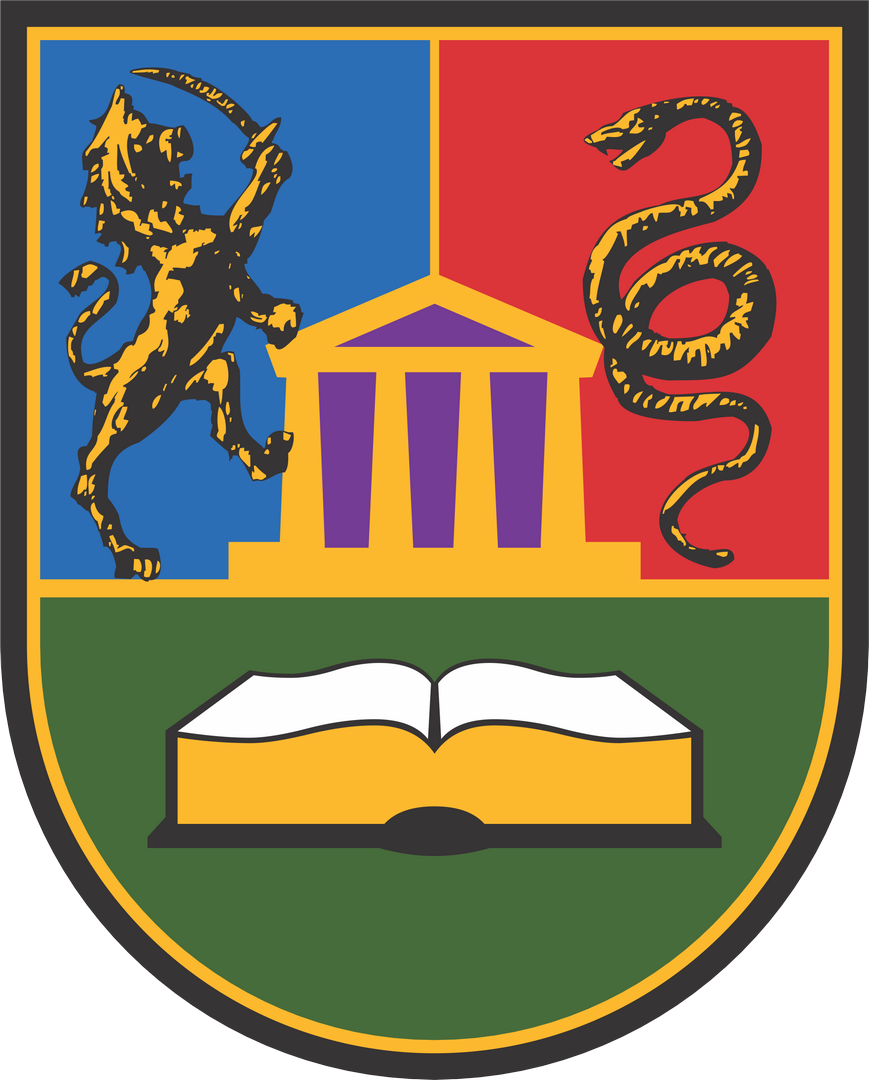

University rankings

Global – Overall
- USNWR Global: 977 (2023)

Regional – Overall
- QS Emerging Europe and Central Asia: 179 (2023)

The University of Kragujevac (Serbian: Универзитет у Крагујевцу, romanized: Univerzitet u Kragujevcu) is a public university in Kragujevac, Serbia. It is the oldest and the largest higher education institution in Šumadija and Western Serbia.

The contemporary centralized university was founded in 1976 and today is organized into 12 constituent faculties. The university offers 118 study programs in the fields of natural sciences and mathematics, social and human sciences, medical sciences, engineering sciences, and arts. As of 2023–24 academic year, there are 15,202 enrolled students on undergraduate, graduate, doctoral, integrated and vocational studies.

University of Kragujevac integrates functions of all faculties and organizational units (centers, institutes) in its structure, by implementing unique policy aimed at constant improving of higher education, and improving the quality of teaching, scientific research and artistic development of youth, introduction of scientific research to students, as well as the creation of material conditions for the operations and development of the university. Students of the University of Kragujevac can use five dormitories – two in Kragujevac, and one each in Užice, Čačak and Kraljevo, where over 1,400 students can reside.

== History ==
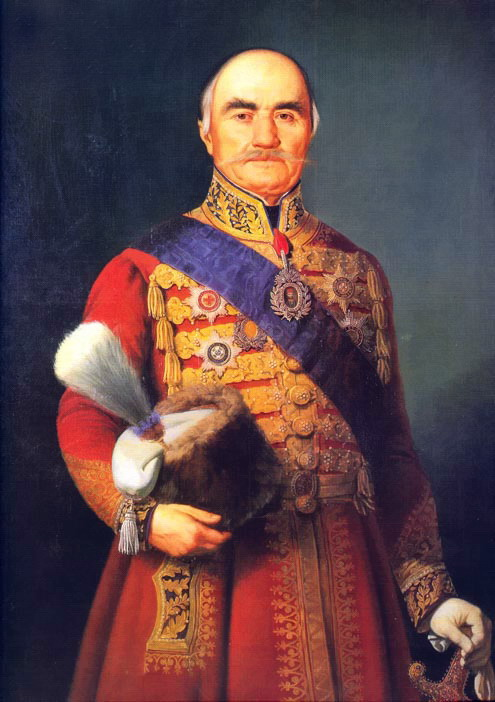
Prince Miloš Obrenović

University of Kragujevac was established on the foundations of the Lyceum of the Principality of Serbia. Lyceum was the first higher education institution in Serbia, established in Kragujevac by the decree of Prince Milos Obrenovic on 1 July 1838. When Belgrade became the capital city of Serbia, most of the ministries moved there along with the Lyceum. In 1863 Lyceum was renamed into the Belgrade Higher School and in 1905 it eventually became the University of Belgrade.

In 1960s, the first modern higher education institutions emerged in Kragujevac, leading to the establishment of the University "Svetozar Marković" on 21 May 1976, today known as the University of Kragujevac. At its beginning, the University of Kragujevac incorporated five faculties (Mechanical Engineering, Economics, Law, Natural Sciences & Mathematics, and Medicine), the College of Mechanical Engineering in Kraljevo, as well as two research institutes: Small Grains Research Institute in Kragujevac and Fruit Research Institute in Čačak. 1970's was a decade of exponential rise in number of higher education institutions in the former Yugoslavia when alongside Kragujevac universities in Osijek, Rijeka, Split, Mostar, Podgorica, Bitola, Maribor, Banja Luka and Tuzla all opened their doors.

As of 2023–24 academic year, University of Kragujevac consists of twelve faculties with around 15,202 students and 1,244 professors and associates. It offers 118 study programs at the undergraduate, graduate and doctoral level. To date, over 33,000 students have graduated from the university, over 1,000 have earned their master's degree and over 800 defended their doctoral dissertation.

== Organization ==
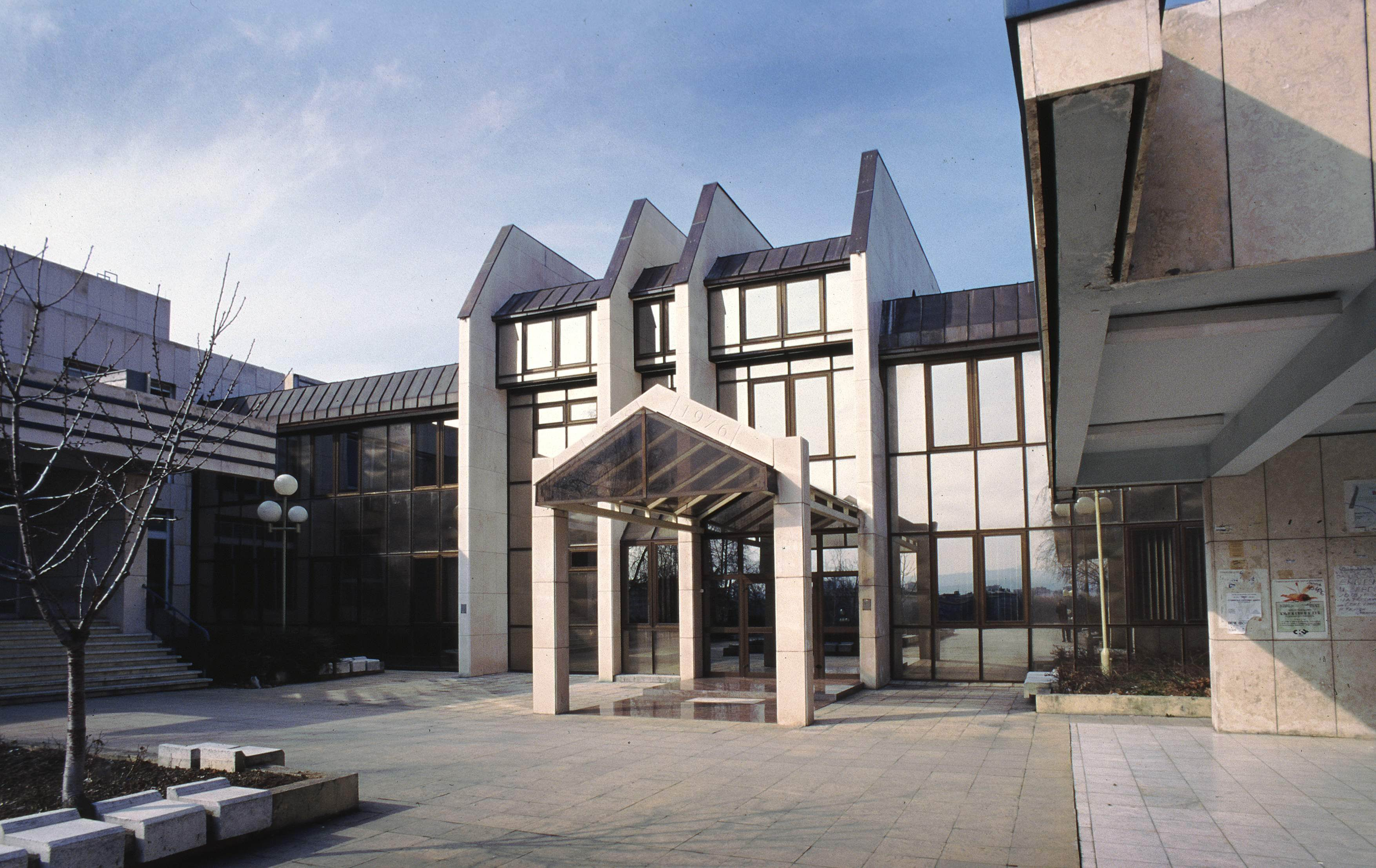
University of Kragujevac Rectorate

=== Faculties ===
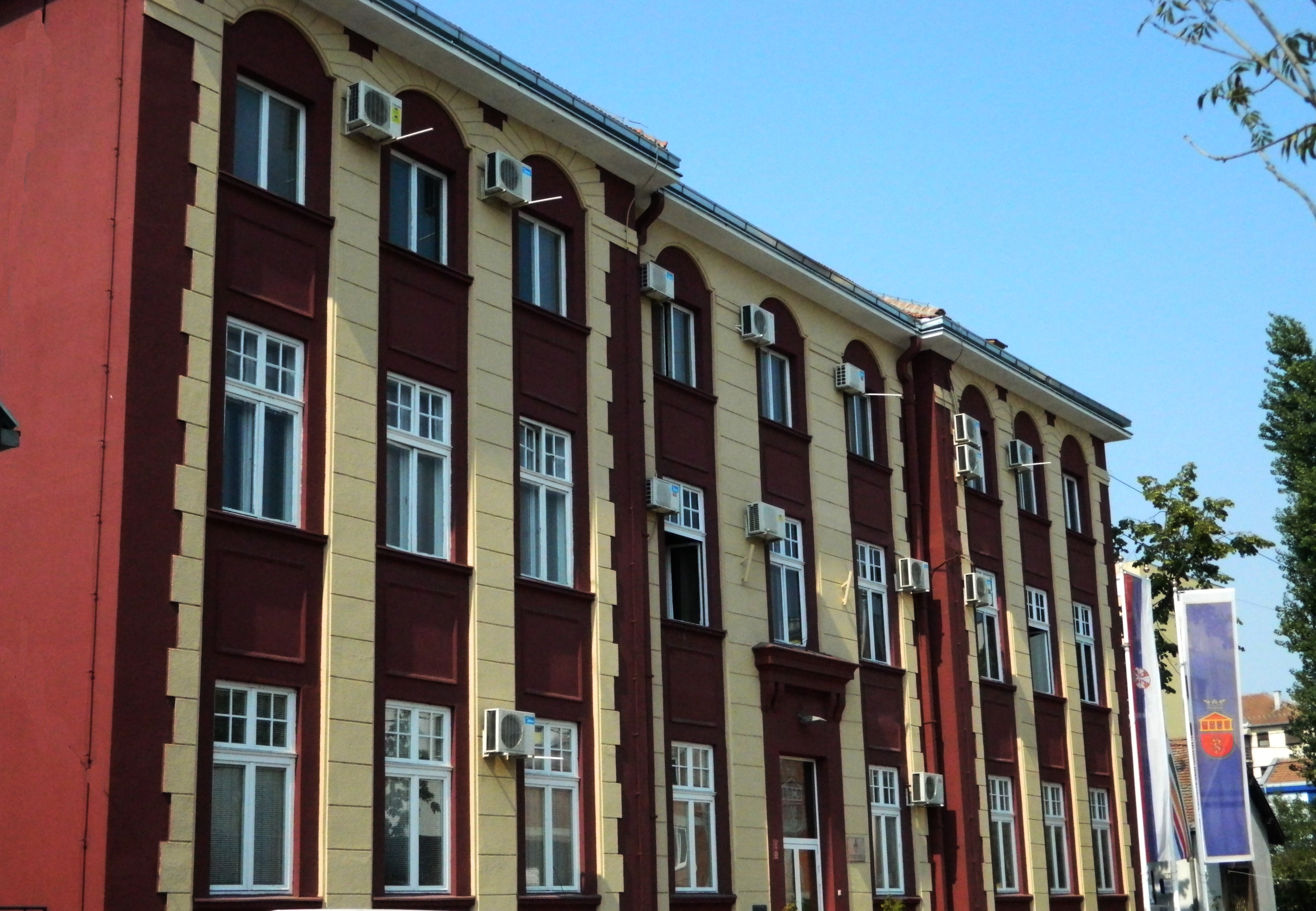
Faculty of Medicinal Sciences

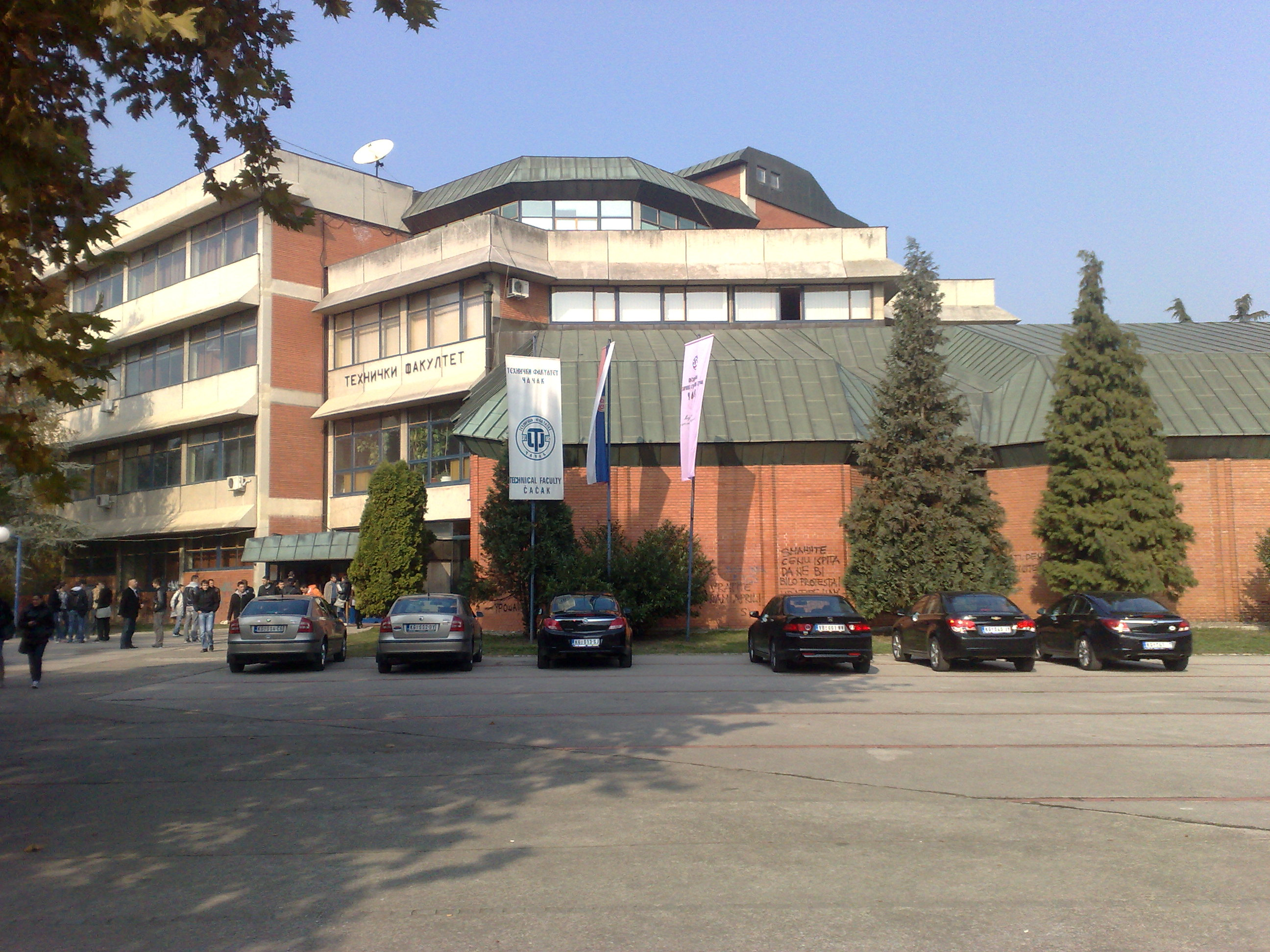
Faculty of Technical Sciences

A total of six faculties of the University of Kragujevac are located in the city of Kragujevac and six in four neighboring cities and towns. The faculties of the University of Kragujevac with data about location, academic staff and number of students as of 2023–24 academic year:

Faculty	Location	Academic staff	Students
Medicine	Kragujevac	359	2,229
Technical Sciences	Čačak	107	2,078
Economics	Kragujevac	72	1,861
Engineering	Kragujevac	83	1,656
Natural Sciences & Mathematics	Kragujevac	133	1,335
Philology & Arts	Kragujevac	226	1,325
Law	Kragujevac	60	1,174
Pedagogy	Jagodina	52	1,074
Hotel Management & Tourism	Vrnjačka Banja	32	777
Pedagogy	Užice	34	707
Mechanics	Kraljevo	44	486
Agronomy	Čačak	42	364
Joint Study Program Psychology	Kragujevac	-	136
Total		1,244	15,202

=== Research centers ===
Besides faculties, University of Kragujevac is also organized through numerous research and education centers, including the following:

- Center for Scientific Research founded on 21 May 1991 by the Serbian Academy of Science and Arts and the University of Kragujevac,
- Centers of Excellence at the University of Kragujevac, which are expected to be built nearby the University's Rectorate in Kragujevac until April 2017,
- Center for Career Development and Student Counselling formed in 2007 as an organizational unit of the University of Kragujevac,
- Center for Lifelong Learning founded in 2010 through TEMPUS project "Development of Lifelong Learning Framework in Serbia",
- Center for Knowledge Transfer founded in 2012 through TEMPUS project KNOWTS "National Platform for Knowledge TRinagle in Serbia",
- Cooperation Training Center founded in 2010 through TEMPUS project WBC-VMnet,
- Office for Business Support founded in 2014 through TEMPUS project WBCInno,
- University Information Center founded in 1989 with a network of 20 institutions and 2,500 computer terminals.

== Publications ==
University of Kragujevac publishes two journals: MATCH - Communications in Mathematical and in Computer Chemistry and Journal of Literature, Language, Art and Culture LIPAR. Since 2003, University of Kragujevac and Faculty of Science in Kragujevac publish international scientific journal MATCH. It is published three times a year, with two volumes. It is referenced in Web of Science and the Journal Citation Reports (JCR), with the impact factor of 3.858 for 2015. In 2012, the University of Kragujevac publishes journal LIPAR three times a year. Ministry of Education, Science and Technological Development of the Republic of Serbia categorized LIPAR magazine in 2014 as a journal of national importance. In addition, Faculties of the University of Kragujevac publish 17 journals in total.

University Library was founded on 6 May 1977, and is located at the Faculty of Law of the University of Kragujevac since 1981. It has total area of 1,500 m2, including a gallery of 436 m2 and 200 places for readers. Library holdings include 100,000 books and 25,000 doctoral dissertations and master thesis, as well as the issues of 450 domestic and 105 foreign journals. It has 19 employees in total, out of which 10 are librarians, and 2 senior librarians. Library is completely automated; by using web portal COBBIS one can search the database of the university library, and other libraries in the system, and reserve the desired material. Representative and multifunctional space of the University Library is also used by University Gallery as a space for organization, promotion, and presentation of scientific, educational, cultural and artistic work of teachers, associates and students of the University of Kragujevac, organization of exhibits, literary evenings, and other activities.

== International cooperation ==
ERASMUS+ Program logo

University of Kragujevac is member of the European University Association, Balkans Rectors' Conference, Danube Rectors' Conference, Community of Mediterranean Universities, World Association of Universities, UNESCO's University Network, etc. University of Kragujevac, as well as the faculties in its structure, participate actively in various international educational and research projects financed through: TEMPUS, Erasmus+, Erasmus Mundus, COST, Horizon 2020, CEEPUS, WUS Austria, and others. University of Kragujevac has agreements on academic cooperation with 77 educational and scientific institutions from United States, European Union member countries, Belarus, Bosnia and Herzegovina, Israel, Montenegro, North Macedonia, Norway, Russian Federation, Switzerland and Ukraine.

International Projects Office is part of the University of Kragujevac since October 2010. The main objective of the Office is to contribute to continuous enhancement of the quality of education and scientific research of the University of Kragujevac. It provides support to incoming and outgoing students and professors participating in the international exchange programs. Department for International Cooperation is aimed at establishing and developing cooperation with other universities and international organizations and strengthening of the internationalization in order to promote the quality and competence of the University in education and research.

== Notable alumni ==
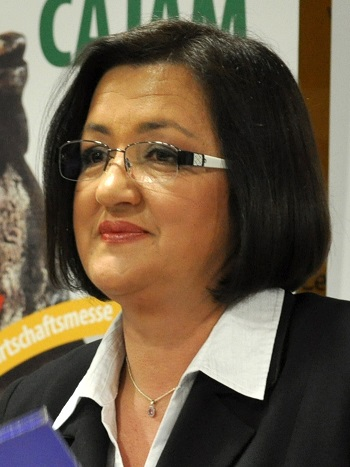
Snežana Bogosavljević Bošković

- Duško Marković, Prime Minister of Montenegro (2016–2020), Vice President of Montenegrin Government (2010–2016), Director of National Security Agency of Montenegro (2005–2010).
- Professor Veroljub Dugalić, General Secretary of the Association of Serbian Banks (2003–2019), Minister of Finance of the Federal Republic of Yugoslavia (2002–2003) and President of the Management Board of the Belgrade Stock Exchange (2003–2009)
- Professor Živadin Stefanovic, Vice President of the Serbian Government (1989–1991)
- Professor Milun Babić, Minister for Coordination and Direction of Technological Development in the Serbian Government (1994–1998)
- Snežana Bogosavljević Bošković, Minister of Agriculture and Environmental Protection (2014–2016)
- Veroljub Stevanović, Mayor of Kragujevac (1996-2000, 2004–2014)
- Mateja Mijatović, Mayor of Raška District (2007–2014)
- Vladimir Jovanovic, Mayor of Prokuplje (2004–2008) and Deputy in Serbian Parliament (2012–2014)
- Dragi Nestorović, Mayor of Kruševac (2014–2017)
- Zvonko Obradović, CEO of the Serbian Business Registers Agency (2007–2019)

== Sport ==
University Sports Federation Kragujevac is composed of sports associations organized by students at twelve faculties at the University of Kragujevac. It was founded in 1973 with the aim to organize student sport activities at the university. The primary activities of the Federation are organization of student sports competitions, student sport popularization, and affirmation of athletes through competitions organized by the Federation and other university sports federations at national and international level.

Many sports activities are organized by the Federation and other sport associations at the University of Kragujevac. Rector's Cup is the largest student sports competition at the University of Kragujevac, organized in six sports: futsal, basketball, volleyball, table tennis, chess, and shooting. The Federation also organizes University Sport League with the aims to promote the City of Kragujevac and the University of Kragujevac, build University capacities, and promote sport and competitive spirit. University Sports Federation Kragujevac has organized European Universities Volleyball Championship in 2011 and World University Championship in Basketball 3x3 in 2012.

== See also ==
- Education in Serbia
- List of universities in Serbia
