= Education in Serbia =

Ministry of Education
- Minister of Education: Dejan Vuk Stanković

National education budget (2025)
- Budget: 3.2% of GDP

General details
- Primary languages: Serbian
- System type: Central

Literacy (2022)
- Total: 99.3%
- Male: 99.6%
- Female: 99.1%

Enrollment (2023)
- Total: 992,982
- Primary: 500,514
- Secondary: 243,756
- Post secondary: 248,712

Attainment (2022)
- Secondary diploma: 53.1%
- Post-secondary diploma: 22.4%

Education in Serbia is divided into preschool (predškolsko), primary school (osnovna škola), secondary school (srednja škola), and higher education levels. It is regulated by the Ministry of Education.

== Historical preview ==
=== Middle Ages ===
The beginnings of education in Serbia date from 11th and 12th century with the establishment of schools at Roman Catholic monasteries in Titel and Bač, which were then part of the Kingdom of Hungary. People were also educated in Eastern Orthodox monasteries like Sopoćani, Studenica, and Patriarchate of Peć.

=== Early modern period ===
After the fall of medieval Serbian state, among newly established schools were Slavic and Latin schools. In 1778, Serbian primary school Norma was established in Sombor. In 1791, Gymnasium of Karlovci, the oldest Serbian gymnasium, was established.

=== Modern era ===
During the First Serbian Uprising, Belgrade Higher School was established in 1808. In 1838, in Kragujevac, Liceum of Serbian Principality was established. It was moved to Belgrade in 1841 and, in 1863, merged into the Belgrade Higher School (having three faculties: philosophy, engineering and law). Later, it became the University of Belgrade.

Public education in Serbia was vastly improved during the reigns of Miloš Obrenović and Alexander Karađorđević. From 1836 to 1855, the number of educational institutions rose from 72 elementary schools and 3 gymnasiums to 300 boys' elementary schools, 13 girls' elementary schools, a lyceum, a gymnasium, 3 high schools, a school of commerce, an artillery school, and an agricultural school. By 1857, all of these institutions were administered by the central government in Belgrade.

=== Contemporary period ===
After World War II, more public universities were established, including University of Novi Sad (1960), University of Niš (1965), University of Pristina (1969), and University of Kragujevac (1976). In 2006, the State University of Novi Pazar was established.

Prior to 2005 and the implementation of the Bologna Process and comprehensive educational reform, Serbia implemented the system inherited from the Socialist Federal Republic of Yugoslavia. System ranked students by professional qualification (stručna sprema). Those who graduated only from primary school were qualified as unqualified workers (nekvalifikovani radnik), while those who graduated gymnasium were semi-qualified workers (polukvalifikovani radnik). Those with a professional high school degree had secondary professional qualification (srednja stručna sprema), those with a college ('higher school') degree had higher professional qualification (viša stručna sprema), while those with a university degree had high professional degree (visoka stručna sprema). Other than professional qualification ranking that indicated workers' ability to work, there also were degrees of professionality (stepen stručne spreme).

== Education system ==
=== Structure ===
Age	Grade/degree	Educational establishments			
6	0	Preschool (Predškolsko); Compulsory Education			
6-7	1	Primary school (Osnovna škola); Compulsory Education			
7-8	2	Primary school (Osnovna škola); Compulsory Education			
8-9	3	Primary school (Osnovna škola); Compulsory Education			
9-10	4	Primary school (Osnovna škola); Compulsory Education			
10-11	5	Primary school (Osnovna škola); Compulsory Education			
11-12	6	Primary school (Osnovna škola); Compulsory Education			
12-13	7	Primary school (Osnovna škola); Compulsory Education			
13-14	8	Primary school (Osnovna škola); Compulsory Education			
14-15	1	Gymnasium (Gimnazija)		Four-year vocational school (Četvorogodišnja stručna škola)	Three-year vocational school (Trogodišnja stručna škola)
15-16	2	Gymnasium (Gimnazija)		Four-year vocational school (Četvorogodišnja stručna škola)	Three-year vocational school (Trogodišnja stručna škola)
16-17	3	Gymnasium (Gimnazija)		Four-year vocational school (Četvorogodišnja stručna škola)	Three-year vocational school (Trogodišnja stručna škola)
17-18	4	Gymnasium (Gimnazija)		Four-year vocational school (Četvorogodišnja stručna škola)	
18-19		Medical School (MD) (Medicinski fakultet)		College (Viša škola)	
19-20		Medical School (MD) (Medicinski fakultet)		College (Viša škola)	
20-21	Non-medical bachelor/ College diploma (180 ECTS)	Medical School (MD) (Medicinski fakultet)		College (Viša škola)	
21-22	Non-medical Bachelor with honors (240 ECTS)	Medical School (MD) (Medicinski fakultet)			
22-23	Non-medical master	Medical School (MD) (Medicinski fakultet)			
23-24	Doctor of Medicine	Medical School (MD) (Medicinski fakultet)			
24-25		Medical residency (Specijalistički staž)			
25-26	Non-medical PhD	Medical residency (Specijalistički staž)			
26-27		Medical residency (Specijalistički staž)			
27-28		Medical doctorate (MD-PhD) (Medicinski doktorat)	Medical specialty (MD/Spec) (Medicinska specijalnost)		
28-29	Specialist diploma	Medical doctorate (MD-PhD) (Medicinski doktorat)	Medical specialty (MD/Spec) (Medicinska specijalnost)		
29-30	MD-PhD	Medical doctorate (MD-PhD) (Medicinski doktorat)			

=== Academic degrees ===
- Primary school certificate (Osnovnoškolsko svedočanstvo; after 8 years of primary school) → 8 years of education
- First professional degree (Trogodišnja stručna diploma; after 3 years of vocational school) → 11 (8+3) years of education
- First professional degree (Četvorogodišnja stručna diploma; after 4 years of vocational school) → 12 (8+4) years of education
- Gymnasium diploma (Gimnazijska diploma; after 4 years of gymnasium) → 12 (8+4) years of education
- Bachelor's degree (Diploma visoke škole; 180 ECTS, after 3 years of university studies → 15 (8+4+3) years of education.
- Bachelor degree with honors (Diploma fakulteta; 240 ECTS, after 4 years of university studies → 16 (8+4+4) years of education.
- Professional master's degree (Specijalistički master; after 4 years of vocational university studies) → 16 (8+4+4) years of education
- Master's degree (Magistratura/master; after 5 years of university studies) → 17 (8+4+5) years of education
- Doctorate/PhD (Doktorat); after 3 years of doctoral studies) → 20 (8+4+5+3) years of education
  - Doctor of Medicine (MD) (Doktor medicine; after 6 years of medical studies) → 18 (8+4+6) years of education
  - Medical specialty (MD/Spec) (Medicinska specijalnost; after 5 years of medical specialization) → 23 (8+4+6+5) years of education
  - Medical doctorate (MD-PhD) (Doktorat medicinskih nauka; after 6 years of doctoral specialization) → 24 (8+4+6+6) years of education

== Preschool education ==
As of school year 2006–2007, preschool in duration of 6 months is compulsory and it is the first part of compulsory education. Attended at the age of 5 or 6 in the local kindergarten, it familiarizes students with the educational system.

Preschool education is attended from the beginning of the year (in the same year when the 1st grade starts). It lasts for at least 4 hours a day for at least 6 months. After it, students have to pass an exam of ability in order to attend primary school.

== Primary education ==
Children enroll in primary schools at the age of seven (usually, all students in a class were born in the same year). However, it is possible for students to enroll at the primary school one year earlier if they were born before March.

The elementary school is divided into two stages:

- Lower grades (grades 1-4)
- Higher grades (grades 5-8)

In the lower grades, students are sorted into classes randomly and have only one teacher and classroom for all subjects, except for English and religion which are taught by separate teachers.

The teacher that teaches lower grade primary school students has only one class of students assigned to them and remains with the class for 4 years.

In the higher grades, students get a whole new range of teachers and classrooms for each subject. Teachers don't change over the years; they remain the same for the next four years. In the 5th grade, each class is assigned The Head Teacher, who is responsible for students in the particular class.

When students graduate from the primary school, they choose whether they want to continue their education or not. National Strategy for Education plans to make secondary education compulsory.

Subjects taught at primary school:

Subject	Grade 1	Grade 2	Grade 3	Grade 4	Grade 5	Grade 6	Grade 7	Grade 8
Mother tongue (Serbian, Hungarian, Albanian, etc.)	5 classes	5 classes	5 classes	5 classes	5 classes	4 classes	4 classes	4 classes
Mathematics	5 classes	5 classes	5 classes	5 classes	4 classes	4 classes	4 classes	4 classes
Serbian as a second language	2 classes	2 classes	2 classes	2 classes	2 classes	2 classes	2 classes	2 classes
English language	2 classes	2 classes	2 classes	2 classes	2 classes	2 classes	2 classes	2 classes
Fine art	1 class	1 class	1 class	1 class	1 class	1 class	1 class	1 class
Music	1 class	1 class	1 class	1 class	1 class	1 class	1 class	1 class
Physical Education	3 classes	3 classes	3 classes	3 classes	3 classes	3 classes	3 classes	3 classes
Compulsory elective (Religion or civics)	1 class	1 class	1 class	1 class	1 class	1 class	1 class	1 class
Nature and Society	2 classes	2 classes	2 classes	2 classes	/	/	/	/
Foreign language (usually German, French or Russian)	/	/	/	/	2 classes	2 classes	2 classes	2 classes
History	/	/	/	/	2 classes	2 classes	2 classes	2 classes
Biology	/	/	/	/	2 classes	2 classes	2 classes	2 classes
Geography	/	/	/	/	2 classes	2 classes	2 classes	2 classes
Physics						2 classes	2 classes	2 classes
Chemistry							2 classes	2 classes

== Secondary education ==
Secondary schools are divided into three types - gymnasiums, vocational, and specialized schools. After graduating from the primary school, students take an entrance exam called matura (lat. maturare). The test covers subjects that were taught in primary school. They are awarded the maximum of 40 points at the test. They also get points from their average marks from 6th to 8th grade, and the maximum is 60 points. Both the points from matura and from average marks are totalized into the maximum of 100 points. Then, students make a list of their preferred schools and courses and are sorted according to how many points they had gained - every secondary school has a limited number of students it takes and a minimum number of points for needed for enrolling. After students make lists for preferred schools, they get into the first school that suits them according to the points. If they fail to get into any of the schools they had listed (ex. if they don't have enough points, but they had chosen very competitive schools), they make another list for the Second Enrollment Deadline.

There are secondary schools that require taking an additional entrance exam(s) as well as the classical point system for entrance. Various music, science, language, philology and ballet schools sort students out based on their talent and skill.

=== Gymnasium ===
Gymnasiums (gimnazija) take four years to complete and offer general and broad education, awarding students a gymnasium diploma. Students are advised to continue their education after graduation as it is very hard to find a job with a gymnasium diploma. There are also four types of special gymnasiums: the Mathematics Gymnasium of Mathematics, the Physics Gymnasium of Physics, the Computer Sciences Gymnasium and the Philology Gymnasium. There are plans for an integrated entrance exam for higher education, as well as unified scoring systems for entrance exams, even for special gymnasiums.

Gymnasiums have its courses (smerovi), and the most common ones are the General Course, Science-Mathematics Course, Humanities-Linguistics Course, Information Technology Course, and the Bilingual Course. Students can only choose one course (they do it when they write their wish list for preferred schools and courses) and they usually don't change it until they graduate. Every course has the same number and list of classes, but the difference is in their schedules (for example, the Humanities-Linguistic Course might have English classes five times a week, while the Science-Mathematics Course offers two English classes a week).

Subjects taught at gymnasiums and the number of 45-minute classes per week depending on the course:

	Humanities-Linguistics Course			
Subject	Grade 1	Grade 2	Grade 3	Grade 4
Serbian language and literature	4 classes	4 classes	5 classes	5 classes
English language	2 classes	3 classes	5 classes	4 classes
Second foreign language	2 classes	2 classes	2 classes	2 classes
Latin	2 classes	2 classes	/	/
Psychology	/	2 classes	/	/
The Constitution and Civil Rights	/	/	/	1 class
Sociology	/	/	/	3 classes
Philosophy	/	/	2 classes	3 classes
History	2 classes	2 classes	3 classes	3 classes
Geography	2 classes	2 classes	2 classes	/
Biology	2 classes	2 classes	2 classes	/
Mathematics	4 classes	3 classes	2 classes	2 classes
Physics	2 classes	2 classes	2 classes	2 classes
Chemistry	2 classes	2 classes	/	/
Computer science and information technology	2 classes	2 classes	1 class	1 class
Music	1 class	1 class	1 class	1 class
Fine art	1 class	1 class	1 class	1 class
Physical education	2 classes	2 classes	2 classes	2 classes

=== Vocational schools ===
Vocational school (stručna škola) specializes students in a particular field and awards them with a First Professional Degree. It also takes four years to complete. Some examples of such schools are Economy School, Medical School, Chemistry School, Technical School, Graphics School, etc.

Professional schools also have courses. Usually, they teach 10-14 general subjects (Serbian, mathematics, geography, biology, history, foreign language etc.), a few professional subjects that are different for almost every course (hygiene in a nurse-technician course at medical schools, for example) and a compulsory block of practice classes.

There are two types of professional school courses: four-year courses and three-year courses. Three-year courses are crafts and if a student that has a craft diploma wants to attend a university, they must enroll in the fourth year of a four-year course inordinately.

Also, after graduating from professional schools, students are given particular ranks. If their school course was "Law", then their rank is the Law Technician. Only four-year courses give ranks.

== Features of primary and secondary education ==
=== Classes ===
Students are organized into classes (odeljenje) of at least 5 for preschools and at least 15 for primary and secondary schools.

In elementary school, a class usually consists of 15-28 students. The students belonging to the class are randomly chosen a few weeks before they start attending the 1st grade. Class structure remains unchanged for the next eight years (with a couple of exceptions).

=== Grading system ===
The grading system is numeric and is present in this form through elementary school and high school. Grades from 1 (the lowest and failing grade) to 5 (the best grade) are used for primary and high schools:

- Insufficient (1) corresponds to American F
- Sufficient (2) corresponds to American D
- Good (3) corresponds to American C
- Very good (4) corresponds to American B
- Excellent (5) corresponds to American A

Higher schools and universities use grades from 5 to 10. All students have to acquire at least 6 (the lowest passing grade). Grades for the 1st grade of primary school are 'descriptive' (teacher writes down the impressions about the particular student and particular subjects).

=== School day ===
Starting from 1st grade, the school shift changes every week. Starting September, students begin attending school in the morning, usually from 8:00AM to 1:10PM. After a week, students would attend school in the afternoon, usually from 1:30PM to 6:40PM. This method has been in use since the 20th century, but is not used on all schools, as some schools change every 2 weeks and some go only in the morning.

=== School year ===
The school year for primary and high schools lasts for 9½ months, except for 8th grade of primary and 3rd/4th grade of secondary school, for which it lasts 9 months. It begins on the first weekday of September, and ends in the half of June (June 15 ±5 days). For 8th grade of primary and 3rd/4th grade of secondary school, it ends in the beginning of June (about one week earlier than for others).

The school year is split into 2 semesters (polugodište), and semesters are split into 2 quarters (tromesečje).

=== School holidays ===
Students have 5 holidays a school year: one in November (Armistice Day, lasts for 2 days), one in January (New Year/Orthodox Christmas, lasts for about 20 days), one in February (Statehood Day, lasts for 2 days), one in April (Orthodox Easter/quarter holiday, lasts for about 10 days) and one in May (Labour Day, lasts for 2 days).

Between school years, in summer, there is summer holiday which last for 2½ months (3 months for those proceeding to high school or university. So, students have about 85 working days in the first semester and 95 in the second semester; 180 in total).

Throughout a school year, there are 2 voluntary school cross country running races (kros) - one in September and one in May. In some places, there are sports competitions in volleyball, basketball, soccer, handball, athletics, and gymnastics every year.

=== Specialized classes ===
Advanced classes are carried out for students with aspirations of learning more about the particular subject, participate in competitions, earn scholarships and prepare for further education.

Supplementary classes (dodatna nastava) are carried out for students with bad grades. Its goals are to help students catch up with lectures, not with learning lesson only for the test, but also with remembering core part of that lesson for longer. It can also be attended by students with higher grades, especially as a preparation for the upcoming test.

Bilingual classes (dvojezička nastava) are based on bilingual education and are taught on Serbian and either English, French, German or Italian.

Full-day classes (celodnevna nastava) are designed for children with working parents. They are organized only for lower grades of primary schools. Children have morning classes, afternoon classes and breaks for play, homework, lunch etc. They have separate teachers for separate shifts. This gives students possibility to be in school for the longest part of the day with their classmates and do all the homework and other school obligations at school. Full-day classes are the extension of already present 'extended stay' (produženi boravak), which allows students to stay at school after the morning shift (typically ending at noon) until their parents come home from work (typically 3-5 pm). Schools offering full-day classes also offer 'extended stay'.

=== Councils ===
Most elementary and secondary schools have their Student council (đački savet) and Peer Team (vršnjački tim). Student councils propose events and improvements and give their opinion about particular subjects to school principals, while Peer Teams deal with students' problems (helping lower ability students learn or helping someone integrate into peer groups) with the help of professional psychologist. In schools without Peer teams, its actions are all on the psychologist. Parents are organized into Parent councils (savet roditelja). Parent councils propose excursions, watch over actions involving students' money and debate about events happening in school. In schools without Student council, Parent council solely practices all aforementioned actions.

=== Foreign students ===
Foreign students are enrolled on the same principle as Serbian citizens are. The only difference is that they are provided free Serbian classes (in case they don't already know Serbian) prior to enrollment so they could understand lectures in school. If the student is from a European country, they can be provided the lectures of mother tongue and culture, free or with compensation.

=== Healthcare ===
All students have to submit their medical report when proceeding to every grade with an odd number. A psychologist's report is also needed if enrolling in primary school. Compulsory vaccinations, physical examinations and dental checkups are carried out in schools for free. Also, during compulsory school running races and similar events, medical teams are always present.

=== Miscellaneous ===
Primary schools can have cafeterias which provide students with meals for the lowest price. They offer mostly croissants with the filling, but some have hamburgers, french fries and more. Some schools offer cooked meals, but their cost is much higher. Excursions (ekskurzija) are one- or two-day trips to places around Serbia and Europe and are organized by the particular school and only in primary and high schools.

== Tertiary education ==
The school year starts on 1 September and ends on 31 May and is split into two semesters. There are six regular exam blocks every school year and several irregular ones which are different for every college or university.

Tertiary level institutions accept students based on their grades in secondary school and entrance exams results.

- College (viša škola) lasts for 3 years. In Serbia, it corresponds to professional universities. After graduating from college, students get a bachelor's degree in Applied Sciences or an equivalent diploma.
- Faculties (fakultet) of universities (univerzitet) last for 4 years until baccalaureate, 5 years until magistracy and 8 years until doctorate. Only exception are the Medical schools, lasting for 6 years until Doctor of Medicine.

Serbia has 17 universities, of which 8 are public and 9 are private, 63 colleges of applied sciences, of which 47 are public and 17 are private, and 8 colleges of academic studies, of which 3 are public and 5 are private.

Serbian citizens can study at public universities for free, while tuition is relatively low for foreign students between €2,000 and €5,000 per year. Tuition costs at private universities vary.

== Special education ==
Education of disabled is handled both in ordinary schools and special schools.

== Adult education ==
In the last decade, adult education is running under the name Druga šansa ("The second chance"). Its purpose is to educate people who didn't graduate primary or high school or both, so they could have better chances of getting a work. Most people attending adult education are minors who missed their chance to enroll in primary schools (most of them being of Roma descent).

== Gallery ==
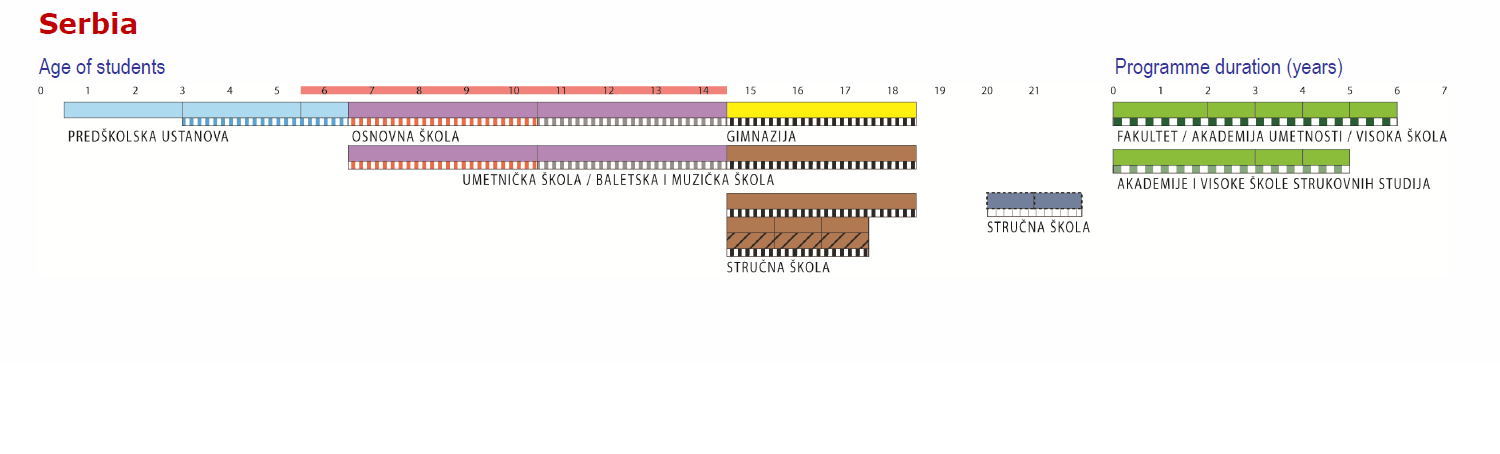
Education system in Serbia

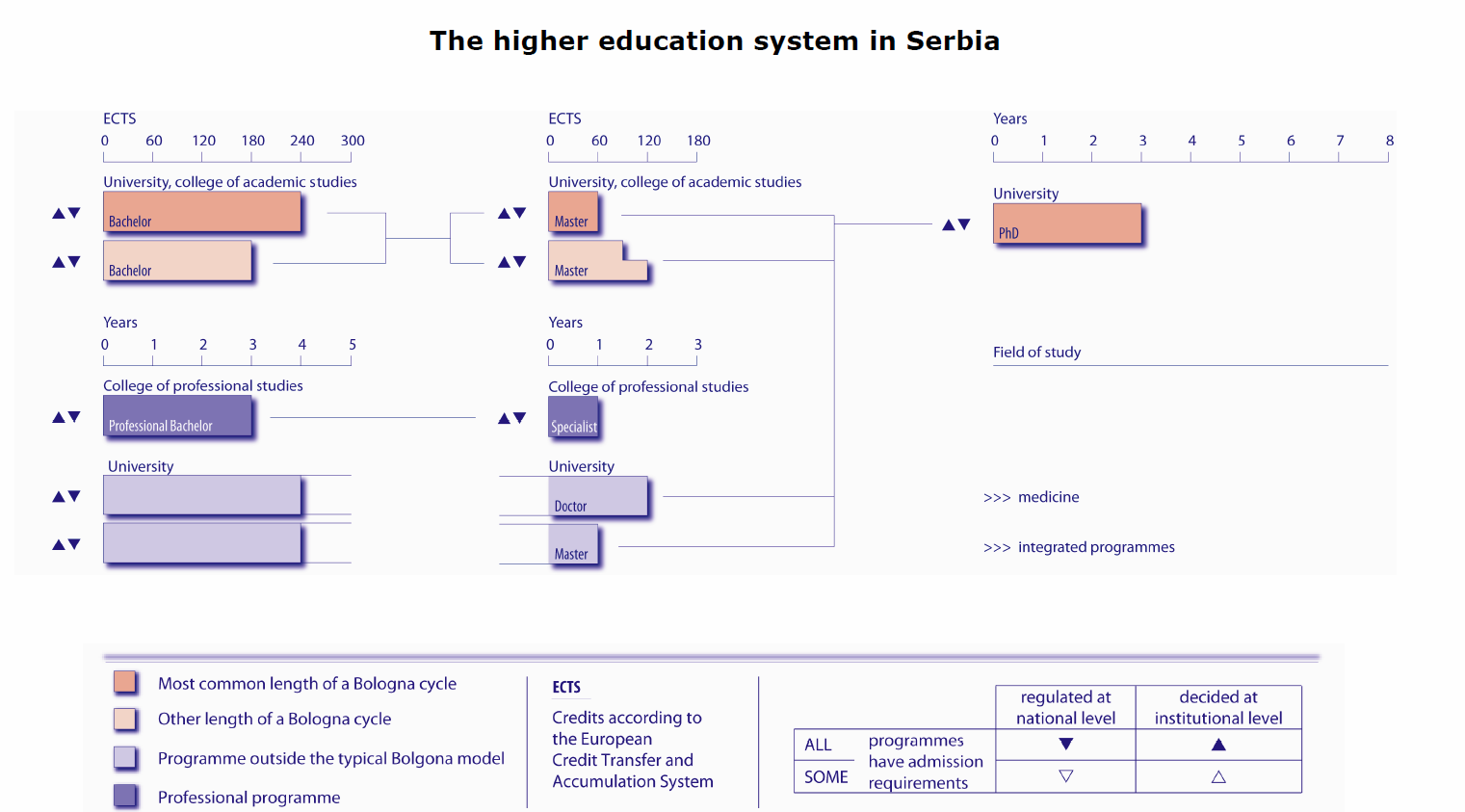
Higher education system in Serbia
