= Tuzla retirement home fire =

2025 fire in Bosnia and Herzegovina

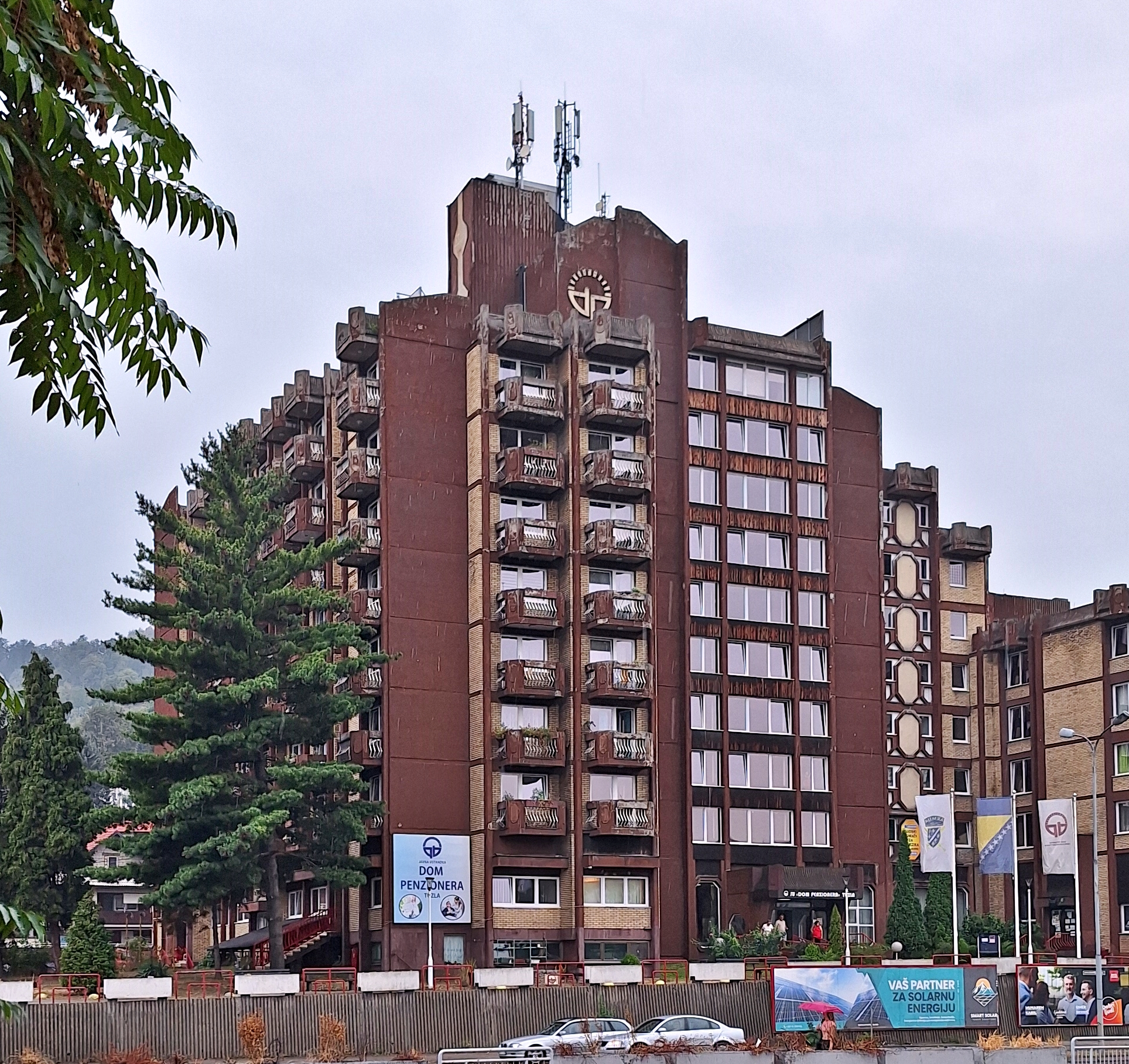
- Tuzla retirement home, site of the fire, photographed in 2024
- Date: 4 November 2025
- Time: ~20:45 CET
- Location: Tuzla, Tuzla Canton, Bosnia and Herzegovina; 44°32′5″N 18°40′44″E
- Type: Fire
- Cause: Overburdened power cable
- Participants: Residents, staff, first‑responders
- Deaths: 17
- Injuries: 30+

On the evening of 4 November 2025, a major fire broke out at the Tuzla retirement home (Bosnian: Dom penzionera Tuzla) in the city of Tuzla, Bosnia and Herzegovina, killing at least 17 people and injuring more than 30 others. The incident has been described as one of the deadliest peacetime tragedies in the country.

== Fire and response ==
At around 20:45 CET (19:45 UTC), a fire began on the seventh floor of the nine-story Tuzla retirement home. That floor was occupied by residents with limited mobility, which complicated evacuation efforts. The fire then engulfed the upper levels of the building. Some of the residents required significant assistance to evacuate.

Firefighters and emergency crews from the local municipality and surrounding cantons evacuated residents and staff. Some of the injured included police officers, firefighters, medical staff, and employees of the retirement home.

== Casualties ==
On 5 November, official authorities announced that the death toll stood at 11. Over 30 injuries were reported, with some in critical condition and undergoing treatment for smoke inhalation. On 6 November, the death toll rose to 12. The next day, an additional person died, totaling to 13 victims. Two women died on 14 November bringing the death toll to 15, and another two women died on 18 November bringing the death toll to 17.

The victims were identified to be from Tuzla and several surrounding towns and municipalities. Their initials were announced on November 6, and full names on November 10.

== Aftermath ==
In the aftermath of the fire, the director of the retirement home resigned. The local government initiated an investigation into the cause of the fire, and discussed reforming care-home safety in Bosnia and Herzegovina. National and regional leaders offered condolences and neighbouring authorities pledged support. A day of mourning on 6 November was pronounced in the Federation of Bosnia and Herzegovina, Brčko District, and Montenegro, while mayor of Tuzla Zijad Lugavić announced four days of mourning in the city.

Protests demanding responsibility for the incident broke out in Tuzla on 5 and 6 November, and resumed on 8 November.

On November 17, the City of Tuzla announced the cancellation of the “Winter in Tuzla” programme, including the New Year’s Eve celebration, citing respect for the victims of the fire.

== Investigation ==
Authorities said a power cable from a radio used by one of the residents was squeezed between that person's bed and the wall, which led to a short circuit and the fire. The fact that the fire began on a floor with immobile inhabitants raised questions about building safety standards and evacuation protocols. Videos of mistreatment resurfaced, as well as ignored complaints about unsanitary conditions, tiny meals and a 30% rent increase.

== See also ==
- List of building or structure fires
- 2025 in Bosnia and Herzegovina
