= Čestmir Mirko Dušek Secondary Music School, Tuzla =

Secondary Music School in Tuzla
- J.U. Srednja muzička škola “Čestmir Mirko Dušek”

Location
- Mirze Delibašića 14; Tuzla 75000; Bosnia and Herzegovina
- Coordinates: 44°32′11.4″N 18°41′01″E

Information
- Type: Public, Co-educational
- Founded: 1957; 69 years ago
- Teaching staff: 35
- Enrollment: 100+
- Average class size: 20
- Website: smstuzla.edu.ba

Secondary Music School in Tuzla (Bosnian: Srednja muzička škola Tuzla) is a Public Institution music school in Tuzla, Bosnia and Herzegovina, established in 1957.

== History ==
=== Foundation and early years ===
Tuzla Music School was founded by the decision of the People's Committee of the Municipality of Tuzla on February 22, 1957. The founders were Čestmír Mirko Dušek and Dubravko Jurić.

=== Recent history ===
In 2017, the school changed its name to High School of Music Čestmir Mirko Dušek Tuzla.

Today the school is attended by about 120 students, studying: piano, accordion, flute, violin, guitar, and clarinet. The school also operates a mixed choir and an accordion orchestra.

The school hosts a semi-annual concert in Tuzla, as well as numerous solo performances of students, and other cultural events.

== Departments ==
- Music theory Department / General Department
- Instrumental Department for accordion
- Instrumental Department for guitar
- Instrumental Department for piano
- Instrumental Department for violin
- Instrumental Department for flute
- Instrumental Department for clarinet

== Degrees offered ==
- Musician general
- Musician accordionist
- Musician guitarist
- Musician pianist
- Musician violinist
- Musician flutist
- Musician clarinetist

== Notable students ==
- Denis Azabagić
- Nihad Hrustanbegovic
- Emir Vildić
- Vladimir Valjarević
- Dženana Šehanović
