= Tuzla Canton =

Canton of the Federation of Bosnia and Herzegovina

Tuzla Canton Tuzlanski kanton (Bosnian) Tuzlanska županija (Croatian) Тузлански кантон (Serbian)
- Canton
- Flag Coat of arms

- Tuzla Canton within Bosnia and Herzegovina
- Coordinates: 44°33′N 18°36′E
- Country: Bosnia and Herzegovina
- Entity: Federation of Bosnia and Herzegovina
- Established: 1994; 32 years ago
- Cantonal seat: Tuzla
- Municipalities: 13 municipalities

Government
  - Prime Minister: Irfan Halilagić (SDA)
  - President of Assembly: Ivana Mijatović (DF)

Area
  - Total: 2,649 km^{2} (1,023 sq mi)

Population (2013 census)
  - Total: 445,025
  - Density: 168.0/km^{2} (435.1/sq mi)
- ISO 3166 code: BA-03
- HDI (2022): 0.797 high · (5th)
- Website: www.vladatk.kim.ba

The Tuzla Canton (Bosnian: Tuzlanski kanton; Croatian: Tuzlanska županija; Serbian: Тузлански кантон) is a federated state and one of ten cantons of the Federation of Bosnia and Herzegovina, one of two entities in Bosnia and Herzegovina. The cantonal seat is the city of Tuzla.

== Municipalities ==
The Tuzla Canton comprises the following municipalities:

Municipality	Population Urban	Population Municipal
Tuzla	74,457	110,979
Živinice	16,157	57,765
Gračanica	12,882	45,220
Lukavac	12,061	44,520
Srebrenik	6,694	39,678
Gradačac	12,764	39,340
Kalesija	2,039	33,053
Banovići	6,432	22,773
Kladanj	4,026	12,348
Sapna	2,072	11,178
Čelić	3,436	10,502
Doboj Istok	4,874	10,248
Teočak	2,763	7,424
Total	160,657	445,025

== History and culture ==
The canton was created by the Washington Agreement in 1994, and its boundaries defined by the Dayton Agreement in 1995. Tuzla Canton was called Tuzla-Podrinje Canton until February 1999. Podrinje means ‘region near the river Drina’ but as the river did not flow through the Canton, a name change was authorised.

The Srebrenik Fortress is Bosnia's best-preserved medieval fort, dating from 1333 and is located in Srebrenik. The Panonian lake is a famous holiday resort for tourists.

Tuzla is considered the hip hop centre of the Balkans due to Edo Maajka, Frenkie and the first hip hop station in Bosnia, which is located in Tuzla, FMJAM. Music artist guitarist Emir Hot, pianist Bešlić, accordionist Emir Vildić and violinist Selma Dizdarević are also from Tuzla. Famous singers Selma Bajrami and Lepa Brena were both born in Tuzla.

== Demographics ==
Ethnic groups of Una-Sana (2013 census)
1. Bosniaks (88.2%)
2. Croats (5.30%)
3. Serbs (1.58%)
4. Other groups (4.96%)

=== 2013 census ===
As of 2013 census, a total of 445,028 inhabitants lives in Tuzla Canton.

Municipality	Nationality						Total
Municipality	Bosniaks	%	Croats	%	Serbs	%	Total
Tuzla Canton	392,355	88.16	23,592	5.30	7,058	1.58	445,028

== Notable people ==
=== Historical figures ===
- Husein Gradaščević, military figure and leader of Bosnian uprising

=== Visual arts ===
- Walter Neugebauer, comic book artist
- Ljubomir Popović, painter
- Nesim Tahirović, painter
- Otto Englander, screenwriter and production manager

=== Performing arts ===
- Denis Avdić, comedian and radio host
- Davor Janjić, actor
- Maya Sar, singer-songwriter
- Vladimir Valjarević, concert pianist

=== Literature ===
- Julijana Matanović, writer
- Meša Selimović, writer

=== Fashion ===
- Andreja Pejić, model

=== Sports ===
- Mirza Delibašić, basketball player
- Amer Delić, tennis player
- Elmedin Kikanović, basketball player
- Svetlana Kitić, handball player
- Mara Lakić, basketball player
- Damir Mršić, basketball player
- Razija Mujanović, basketball player
- Damir Mulaomerović, basketball player
- Jusuf Nurkić, basketball player
- Zoran Pavlović, football player
- Dragan Perić, track and field athlete
- Andrea Petkovic, tennis player
- Miralem Pjanić, football player
- Ana Šimić, track and field athlete

== Economy ==
=== Mining ===
- Kreka coal mine

== See also ==
- Political divisions of Bosnia and Herzegovina
- List of heads of the Tuzla Canton
