= Valjarević =

Valjarević (Serbian Cyrillic: Ваљаревић) is a surname. Notable people with the surname include:

- Svetislav Valjarević (1911–1996), Serbian footballer
- Vladimir Valjarević (born 1973), American classical pianist
