= Sead Čaušević =

Bosnian politician (born 1949)

Prime Minister of Tuzla Canton
- In office 10 February 2011 – 26 March 2014
- Preceded by: Enes Mujić
- Succeeded by: Bahrija Umihanić

Personal details
- Born: 15 September 1949 (age 76) Tuzla, PR Bosnia and Herzegovina, FPR Yugoslavia
- Party: Social Democratic Party
- Children: 2
- Education: University of Sarajevo

Sead Čaušević (born 15 September 1949) is a Bosnian politician who served as the Prime Minister of Tuzla Canton for three years until his forced resignation in 2014, during the violent anti-government protests and riots in Bosnia and Herzegovina.

== Biography ==
Čaušević was born in Tuzla in 1949. He completed gymnasium in Gračanica in 1968 and graduated from the Faculty of Law in the University of Sarajevo in 1972. His political career began in 1973 when he became a member of the municipal court in Gračanica.

He served in this position until 1977, when he became secretary to the Municipality of Gračanica for a year, then he was the President of the Executive Board of the municipality until 1982. Afterwards, for 18 years, he was the Director of Grafopak d.d. Gračanic, a paper packaging manufacturing company. He then stepped down to be the company's deputy director for five years. He re-entered politics in 2005 when he became a member of the Parliamentary Assembly of Bosnia and Herzegovina representing Gračanica for the Social Democratic Party.

In January 2014, Čaušević said that his salary was the fourth highest in the Tuzla Canton.

=== 2014 riots and resignation ===
On 6 February 2014, when violent anti-government protests and riots broke out across Bosnia and Herzegovina, Čaušević said that he felt his life was "in danger". Čaušević was forced to resign as prime minister of Tuzla Canton on 7 February 2014, amid countrywide riots. It was reported that after resigning, he left Tuzla for the Bosnian capital Sarajevo. He was succeeded as prime minister by Bahrija Umihanić, who was appointed to the post on 26 March 2014.
