= Selim Bešlagić =

Bosnian politician (born 1942)

Governor of Tuzla Canton
- In office 18 January 2001 – 6 October 2002
- Preceded by: Tarik Arapčić
- Succeeded by: Office abolished

30th Mayor of Tuzla
- In office December 1990 – February 2001
- Preceded by: Mirza Muradbegović
- Succeeded by: Jasmin Imamović

Personal details
- Born: 23 February 1942 (age 84) Tuzla, Independent State of Croatia (modern-day Bosnia and Herzegovina)
- Party: Our Party (2017–present)
- Other political affiliations: Social Democratic Party (1992–2017)

Selim Bešlagić (born 23 February 1942) is a Bosnian politician who served as the 30th mayor of Tuzla from 1990 to 2001.

He was mayor of Tuzla during the Bosnian War of 1992–95. Bešlagić also served as Governor of Tuzla Canton from 2001 until 2002.

He was a longtime member of the Social Democratic Party, until he left it in 2017 to join Our Party.
