= Jasmin Imamović =

Bosnian politician and writer (born 1957)

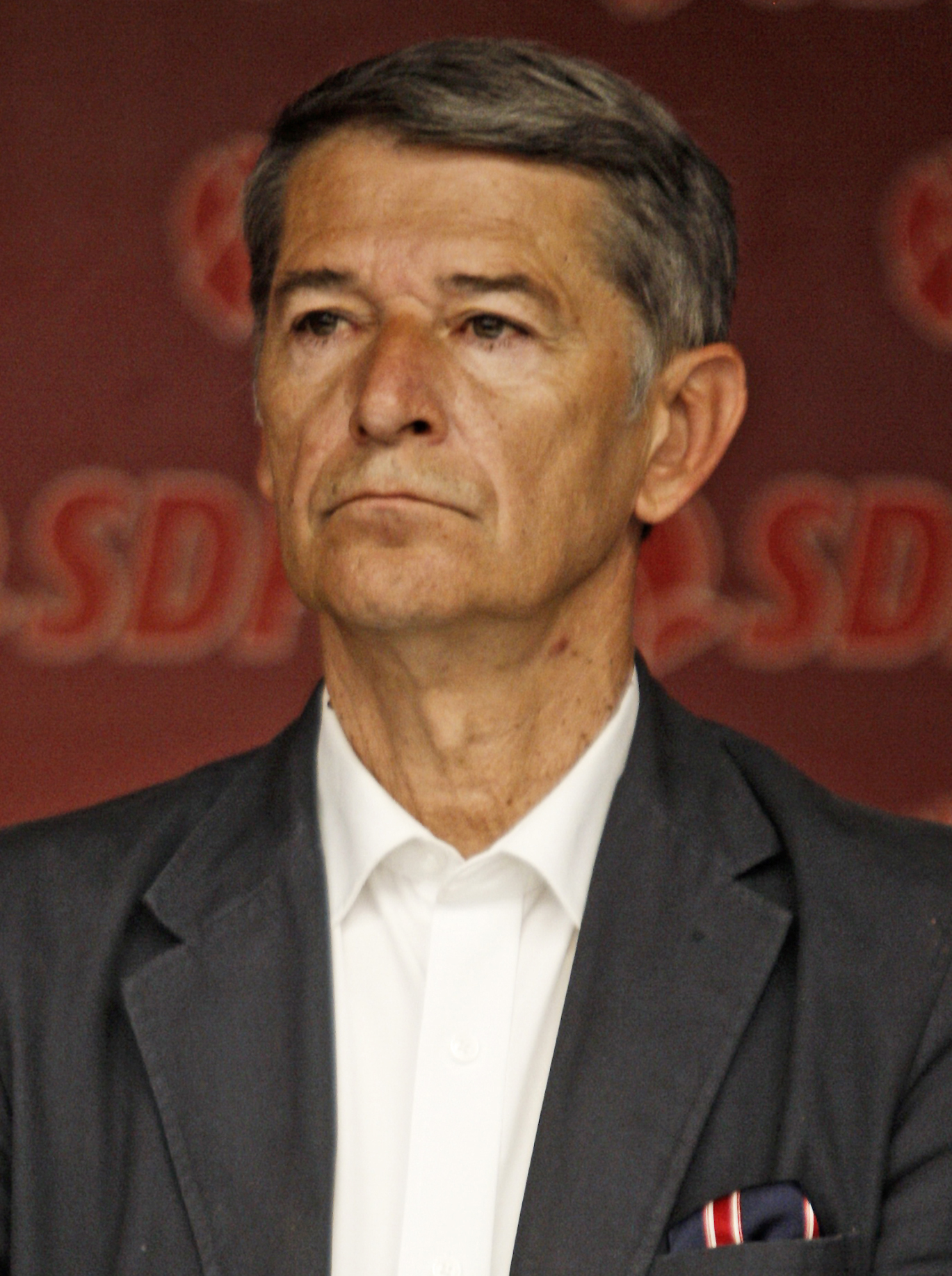
- Imamović in 2016

Member of the House of Representatives
- Incumbent
- Assumed office 1 December 2022
- Constituency: 5th Electoral Unit of the FBiH

31st Mayor of Tuzla
- In office February 2001 – 1 December 2022
- Preceded by: Selim Bešlagić
- Succeeded by: Zijad Lugavić

Personal details
- Born: 8 October 1957 (age 68) Brčko, PR Bosnia and Herzegovina, FPR Yugoslavia
- Party: Social Democratic Party (2000–present)
- Spouse: Žaneta Imamović
- Children: 2
- Education: University of Sarajevo (LLB)
- Profession: Politician, writer

Jasmin Imamović (born 8 October 1957) is a Bosnian politician and writer serving as member of the national House of Representatives since 2022. He previously served as the 31st mayor of Tuzla from 2001 to 2022.

Imamović is a member of the Social Democratic Party and holds a degree from the Faculty of Law at the University of Sarajevo.

== Early life and education ==
Imamović was born to a Bosniak family in Brčko, FPR Yugoslavia, present-day Bosnia and Herzegovina, on 8 October 1957. He graduated from the Faculty of Law at the University of Sarajevo.

== Political career ==
Imamović has been a member of the Social Democratic Party (SDP BiH) since 2000. He was elected mayor of Tuzla for the first time in the 2000 municipal elections, succeeding Selim Bešlagić in February 2001. He was then re-elected as mayor in the 2004, 2008, 2012, 2016 and the 2020 municipal elections.

Imamović was elected to the national House of Representatives in the 2022 general election, obtaining over 23,000 votes, the most amongst the SDP BiH candidates. Due to him becoming a member of Parliament, he was forced to resign as mayor of Tuzla. Imamović was succeeded as mayor by fellow SDP BiH member Zijad Lugavić in December 2022.

== Writing career ==
Acclaimed for his short stories and novels, Imamović has published three books, titled The killing of death, Immortal deer and The adorer of a moment (Obožavatelj trena, Oboževalec trenutka) which was the third best-selling book in Slovenia in 2004.

== Personal life ==
Jasmin is married to Žaneta Imamović, with whom he has two daughters.

Political offices
| Preceded by Selim Bešlagić | Mayor of Tuzla; 2001–2022 | Succeeded by Zijad Lugavić |
