= School of Economics and Trade, Tuzla =

Economic-Trade School Tuzla
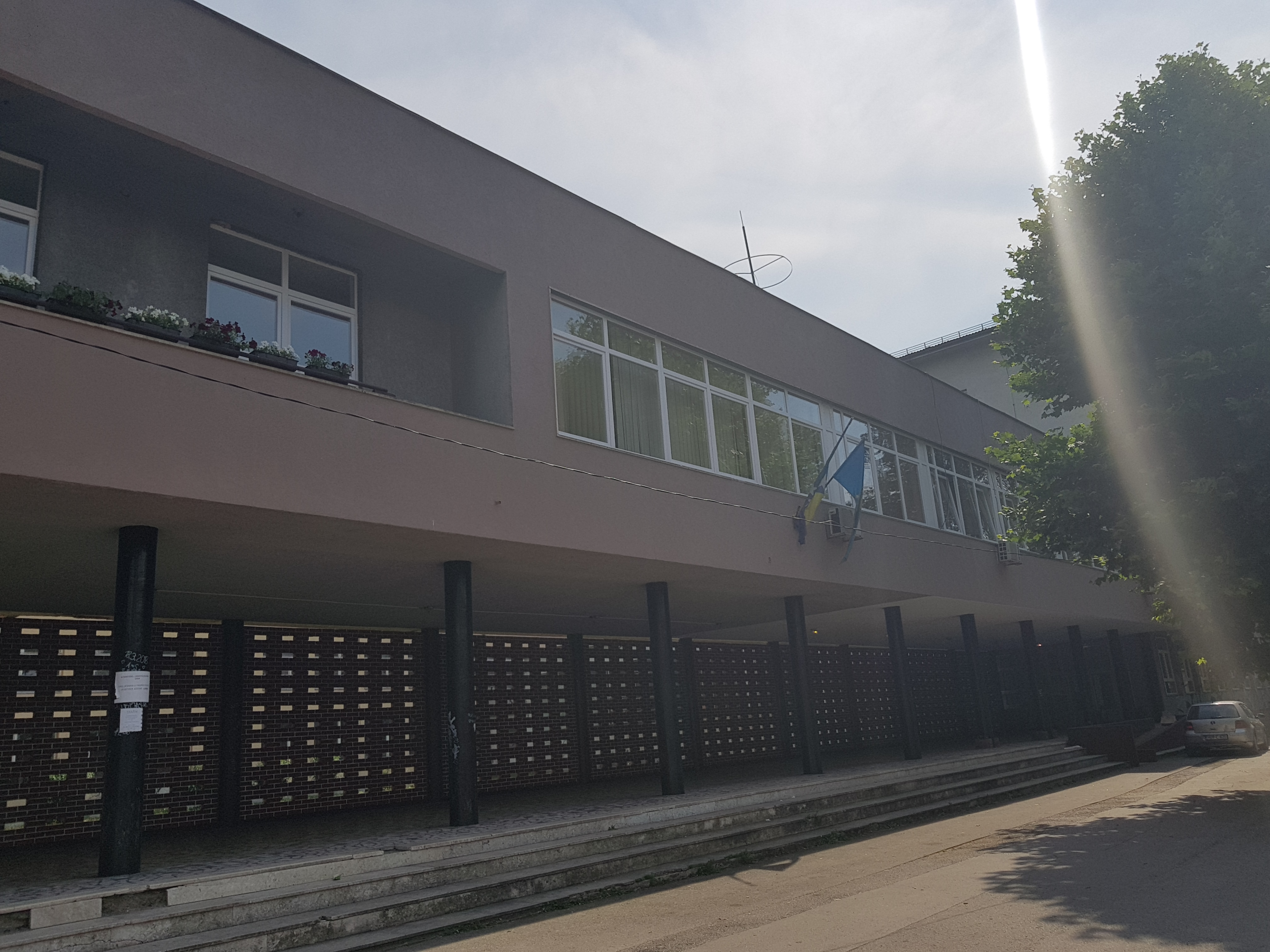

Location
- Muhameda Hevaije Uskufija 3 Tuzla; Bosnia and Herzegovina
- Coordinates: 44.539507°N 18.667986°E

Information
- Type: Public, Co-educational
- Founded: 1844
- Principal: Munevera Rahmanović Hrbat
- Teaching staff: 39
- Enrollment: 306
- Average class size: 15+
- Language: Bosnian, Croatian, Serbian
- Colour: dark green
- Website: http://www.ekonomskotrgovinska.com

Economic-Trade School Tuzla (Bosnian: Ekonomsko-trgovinska škola Tuzla) is one of the oldest schools still in function in Bosnia and Herzegovina. It was formed in 1844. where it began working with 105 students, which were divided in three classes.
