= Pannonian Lakes =

Artificial lake in Bosnia and Herzegovina

Pannonian Lake
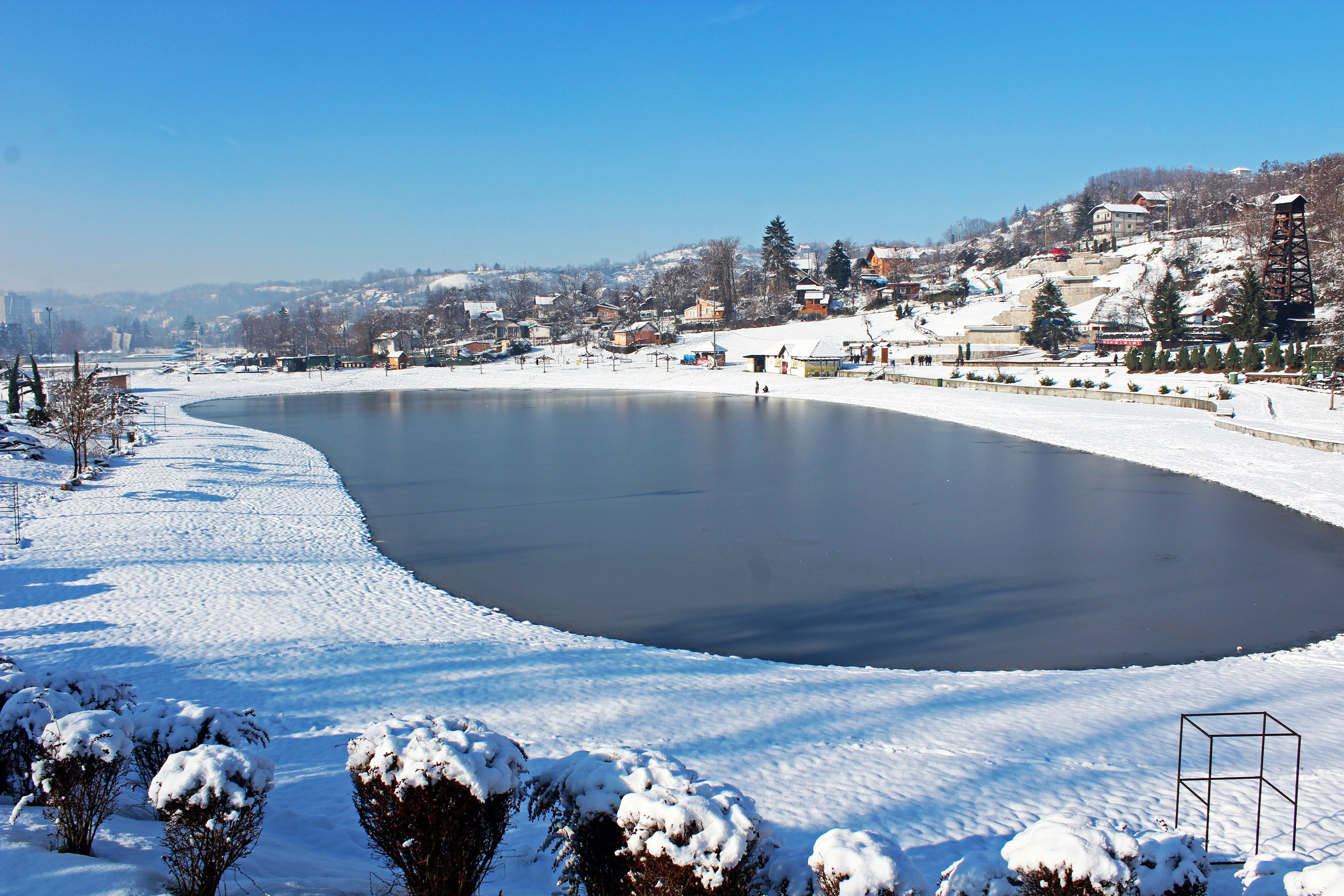
- Panonsko Lake in Tuzla

- Location within Bosnia and Herzegovina
- Interactive map of Pannonian Lake
- Location: Bosnia and Herzegovina
- Coordinates: 44°32′22″N 18°40′50″E
- Type: artificial lake

Panonsko Lake is an artificial lake of Bosnia and Herzegovina. It is located in the municipality of Tuzla. This lake is commonly used as a leisure spot by both tourists and locals alike. It is the only salt lake in mainland Europe.

== See also ==
- List of lakes of Bosnia and Herzegovina
