= St. Francis Catholic School Center =

Coordinates: 44.5366°N 18.6809°E

Catholic School Centre "St. Francis"
- Katolički Školski Centar "Sv. Franjo"
- Coat of arms

Location
- Klosterska 10; Tuzla; Bosnia and Herzegovina

Information
- School type: Public
- Motto: Schola Domusque Nostra
- Patron saint: Saint Francis
- Founded: 1883; 143 years ago
- Principal: Alen Matošević
- Headmaster: Marko Zubak
- Website: https://ksc-tuzla.edu.ba/

Katolički Školski Centar "Sveti Franjo", commonly abbreviated as KŠC Sv.Franjo, is a school founded by the nuns of the Daughters of Divine Charity in Tuzla, Bosnia and Herzegovina.

== History ==
The school was founded in 1883. According to records and testimony, the school's functions were well organized, and the quality of education was very good. After the Communists came to power following the Second World War, such schools were closed and their property confiscated.

KŠC Tuzla was re-established in 1997 by the Roman Catholic Archdiocese of Vrhbosna.

== High school ==
The High School started operating on November 6, 1995, in the premises of the Elementary School Pazar in Tuzla with 102 students divided into four classes. After two years of work, in 1997 the school moved to the High School of Mechanical Engineering. Classes were held at the Mechanical School until the fall of 2001, when it moved to its own building.

== Elementary school ==
The elementary school started operating in 2001.
