= Emir Vildić =

Bosnian–German accordionist

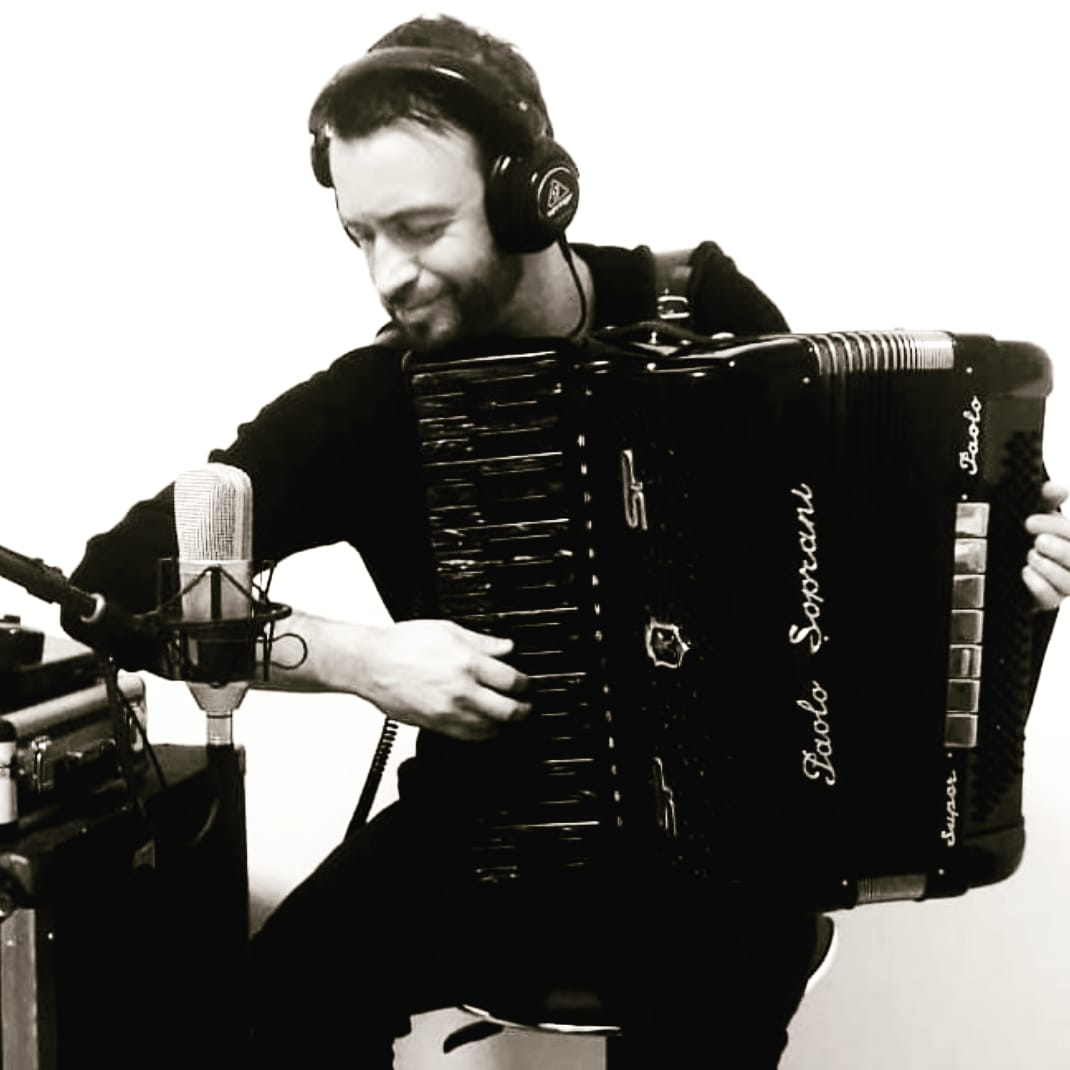
- Emir Vildić in 2020

Background information
- Born: Emir Vildić; 25 February 1984 (age 42); Tuzla, SR Bosnia and Herzegovina, SFR Yugoslavia
- Genres: Classical, contemporary, sevdah, jazz, tango, blues, rock, swing, pop
- Occupations: Concert accordionist, accordion teacher
- Instruments: Accordion, piano, keyboard
- Years active: 1994–present
- Label: Spinnup x Universal Music

Emir Vildić (born 25 February 1984) is a Bosnian - German musician, with a honours degree in Diploma – Musician, and award winning teacher.

== Education ==
Vildić finished his elementary music education in Tuzla in the department of the accordion. He attended Secondary Music School in Tuzla of two sections: Theory Department and the Instrumental Accordion Department in the class of prof. Midhat Zulić. During studies on the accordion, Emir Vildić as a soloist and member of ensemble chamber orchestra and mixed choir participated in many concerts and competitions in the country and abroad and won 10 awards of which 7 first and 3 second awards. After high musical school matriculation work, Vildić earned his high school diplomas: "Musician of general direction“ and "Musician accordionist".

The former director of the Secondary Music School in Tuzla, Piano Professor Nedžmija Omrećehajić, wrote that Vildić showed his talents from his first year, with an attitude that had "positive effects on the entire working atmosphere in the group", and rapidly developed his musical abilities, in addition to involvement in school activities organizing concerts in Tuzla, the canton and in national and international competition.

Vildić holds an academic degree, Music Teacher from the teaching department of music education at the University Džemal Bijedić of Mostar. Emir Vildić also studied accordion at University SPU, and has completed his Accordion Graduate Diploma in the class of Professor Vojin Vasović. He continued his professional training in the field of child pedagogy at the Bildungswerk der Bayerischen Wirtschaft (bbw) Munich, where he wrote a diploma thesis on "Musical stimulation in day care centers for children from three to six years of age".

== Career ==
=== Accordion and Music teacher ===
After passing the mandatory, preparatory state exam, required for work in state schools in Bosnia and Herzegovina, since 2008 Vildić has been working as an accordion teacher in public elementary music schools in Tuzla Canton, Bosnia and Herzegovina and music schools in Germany. His practice of teaching involves a range of techniques, including individual and orchestral accordion classes. Over 100 students learn classical accordion in Vildić's classes. His students performed on a large number of public concerts and won prizes in the accordion competitions in Bosnia and Herzegovina, Austria, Germany, France, Switzerland such as: Akordeonfest in Graz; International Accordion competition in Trossingen Hohner Conservatory; CMA – World Trophy for accordion – Trophée Mondial de l'Accordéon in France, etc.

=== Teacher of music in preschool institutions ===
Parallel to his pedagogical work in music schools, Emir Vildić designed and implemented several music education projects for pre-school children, the most important of which are: Music Pedagogical Development Programme "MEP Avista" and "Music Lab", which he implemented in Bosnia and Herzegovina and Germany.

These programmes strive to develop children's love of music and musical competence.

=== Music handbook ===
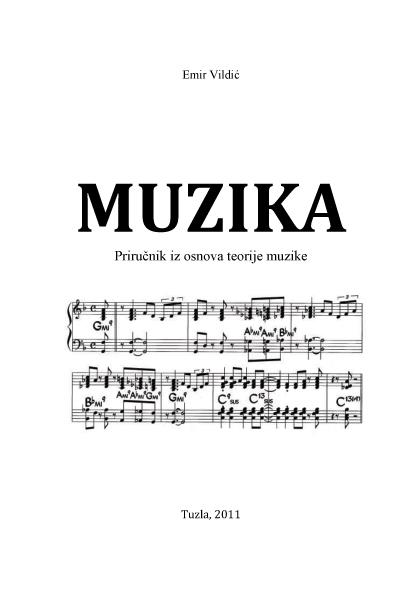
Music handbook by Emir Vildić

In 2011, Vildić wrote a handbook on the basis of music theory, "Muzika" (Music), in the Bosnian language. The handbook of the basis of the theory of music by Emir Vildić is intended for those who access the area for the first time. Matter in the manual deals with simple, clear and concise overview, written in simple text with no redundant data, and as such is suitable for beginners and children of school age. The manual features carefully selected material with all the examples that significantly facilitate the mastering of music theory and musical concepts. Tailored to the needs of the subject solfegio with the theory of music in music schools, but may be of help to all those who want to gain self-learning knowledge of music theory.

Professor Vildana Zukić reviewed this work, stating, "the manual deals with simple, clear and concise overview, written in simple text with no redundant data, and as such is suitable for beginners and children of school age. The manual features carefully selected material with all the examples that significantly facilitate the mastering of music theory and musical concepts." Professor Jasmin Brašnjić wrote that the guide, "will have great significance for the profession", clearly defining explanations in a field often obscured with excessive evidence and detail.

=== Scientific music articles ===
For the academic study online course Listening to World Music with professor Carol Ann Muller from the University of Pennsylvania, Vildić has written several scientific articles on the following topics: Gregorian chant and German monastic order; Graceland collaboration; Tuvan throat singing; Music of the Central African Republic, Pygmy music; Aboriginal Australia, Rocking for Rights; and Kalahari bushmen.

=== Concert activities ===
At the age of 12, Emir Vildić held the concert for the first time and until today he regularly performs at concerts as a soloist, a member of standard and non-standard chamber ensembles, orchestras etc. He has performed in almost all biggest cities in his country but also live in radio and television. Emir's special emphasis is playing concerts for children and babies. Emir is also an active member of the jury at domestic and international competitions, professional assets, pedagogical and teaching councils. He regularly participates in professional lectures, seminars, workshops, master classes in the organization of schools, faculties, pedagogical and educational institutes, associations, and other organizations. And due to the previous irrefutable contribution to the development of music education in the local communities of Tuzla Canton and country Bosnia and Herzegovina, he has received many awards and recognitions from state and private, public organizations and institutions.

=== Accordion repair workshop ===
Vildić is one of the few remaining reputable masters of accordion-tuning in the Balkans. He has been trained for a number of years on advanced accordion repair techniques. Vildić ran his own accordion repair and tuning workshop based in the city of Tuzla. Vildić also ran his own accordion repair and tuning workshop based in Tuzla. His workshop nurtures the old, manufactory style of accordion repairing and tuning by the identical methods represented by the leading German and Italian accordion factories. Users of his services are primary and secondary music schools, elementary general education schools, kindergartens, eminent artists, concert masters, and students of music schools.

== Awards ==
As an accordion soloist and member of ensemble chamber orchestras and mixed choirs, Vildić participated in many concerts and competitions in the country and abroad, winning numerous awards. Among the most important of these are: International competition in the music Pianello Val Tidone, Italy 1998 * Second prize as a member of the accordion orchestra, Primary Music School in the class of teacher Jahić Selma, competition of students of music FBiH, S 1999 * First prize trio accordion competition of students of music Federation, N 2002 * Second prize duo accordion competition of students of music Federation, N 2002 * Special Award as a member of the accordion orchestra in the class of Prof. Zulić Midhat, competition of students of music Federation, N 2002 * First prize as a member of the choir class of Dr. Prof. Dusek Ćestimira, competition of students of music Federation, N 2002 * Second prize, solo accordion competition of students of music Federation, B 2003 * First prize duo accordion competition of students of music Federation, Z 2004 * First prize as a member of the accordion orchestra in the class of Professor Zulić Midhat, competition of students of music Federation, Z 2004 * First prize as a member of the choir high music school in the class of Dr. Professor Dusek Ćestimira competition of students of music Federation, Z 2004

== Discography ==
Solo is the debut studio album, an extended play by graduate musician, from the University with a honours degree in Diplom – Accordionist, and award winning teacher, Emir Vildić. The album was recorded in Germany and produced by Emir Vildić. It was released on 9 December 2020, worldwide, through Spinnup x Universal Music. The album in digital form is available on all streaming services such as: Spotify, Deezer, Apple Music, Amazon Music, Napster etc

== Track listing – Solo (album) ==
1. Autumn Leaves by Joseph Kosma
2. Blue Bossa by Kenny Dorham
3. Fly Me to the Moon by Bart Howard
4. You'd Be So Nice to Come Home To by Cole Porter
5. Jordu by Irving Jordan

== Music videos ==
List of music videos, showing year released and director
Title	Year	Director(s)	Notes
"Oblivion"	2020	Edin Muharemagić & Riad Skopljak	Filmed in Siegen, Germany and Tuzla, Bosnia and Herzegowina
