= List of heads of the Tuzla Canton =

Prime Minister of Tuzla Canton
- Premijer Tuzlanskog kantona
- Coat of arms of Tuzla Canton
- Incumbent; Irfan Halilagić since 1 March 2025
- Appointer: Tuzla Cantonal Assembly
- Inaugural holder: Izet Hadžić (as governor); Hazim Vikalo (as prime minister)
- Formation: 22 August 1994

This is a list of heads of the Tuzla Canton.

== Heads of the Tuzla Canton (1994–present) ==
Party of Democratic Action
Social Democratic Party
Movement of Democratic Action

=== Governors ===
№	Portrait	Name (Born–Died)	Term of Office		Party
1		Izet Hadžić (1963–)	22 August 1994	14 November 1996	SDA
2		Sead Jamakosmanović (1949–2020)	14 November 1996	2 November 1998	SDA
3		Tarik Arapčić (1959–)	2 November 1998	18 January 2001	SDA
4		Selim Bešlagić (1942–)	18 January 2001	6 October 2002	SDP BiH

=== Prime Ministers ===
№	Portrait	Name (Born–Died)	Term of Office		Party
1		Hazim Vikalo (1960–)	3 December 1996	8 May 1999	SDA
2		Bajazit Jašarević (1957–)	8 May 1999	27 January 2001	SDA
3		Senahid Šaković (1954–)	27 January 2001	29 January 2003	SDP BiH
(2)		Bajazit Jašarević (1957–)	29 January 2003	28 February 2007	SDA
4		Enes Mujić (1954–)	28 February 2007	10 February 2011	SDA
5		Sead Čaušević (1949–)	10 February 2011	26 March 2014	SDP BiH
6		Bahrija Umihanić (1966–)	26 March 2014	20 February 2015	SDA
7		Bego Gutić (1970–)	20 February 2015	17 February 2018	SDA
8		Jakub Suljkanović (1964–)	17 February 2018	20 July 2019	SDA (until February 2018)
		Jakub Suljkanović (1964–)	17 February 2018	20 July 2019	PDA (from March 2018)
9		Denijal Tulumović (1959–)	20 July 2019	26 January 2021	SDA
10		Kadrija Hodžić (1958–)	26 January 2021	28 February 2022	SDP BiH
11		Irfan Halilagić (1988–)	28 February 2022	20 February 2025	SDA
12		Edis Dervišagić (1973–)	20 February 2025	1 March 2025	SDP BiH
(11)		Irfan Halilagić (1988–)	1 March 2025	Incumbent	SDA
