= Combined Secondary Traffic School, Tuzla =

- Mješovita srednja saobraćajna škola Tuzla
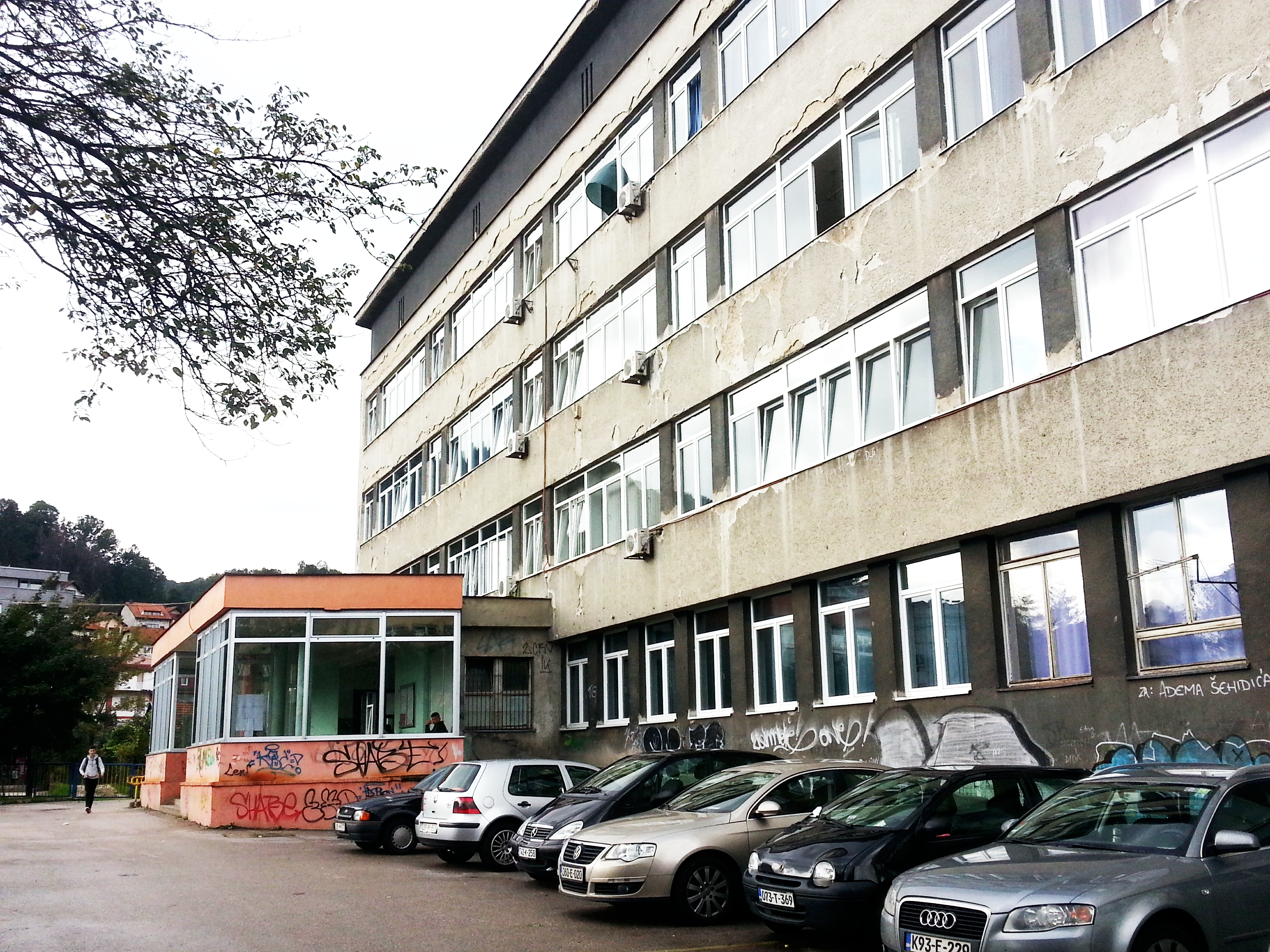

Location
- Bosne Srebrne br.8 Tuzla; Bosnia and Herzegovina
- Coordinates: 44°32′18.2″N 18°40′01.1″E

Information
- Type: Public, Co-educational
- Founded: 1961/62
- Principal: Karić Šekib
- Teaching staff: 90+
- Enrollment: 809+
- Average class size: 33
- Language: Bosnian, Croatian, Serbian
- Website: saobracajna.skolatk.edu.ba

The Combined Secondary Traffic School (Mješovita srednja saobraćajna škola) is a high school in Tuzla.

Although a PI Mixed Secondary traffic school formed only in 1992. Decision of the Assembly of Tuzla municipality, its origins go back much earlier. In fact, the start of school in Tuzla Traffic associated with the integration of the Industrial College of the mechanical and electrical sections of the Technical School, which was formed Electro-school center, which was started in 1961/62 year. In the new building, which today houses their school.

That same year, the first enrolled students at the traffic department of the Technical School to provide education for technicians. In 1970 creates two separate academic institutions: Electrical and Mechanical School Center -saobraćajni training center.

In 1981. the reorganization of the Center by establishing two basic organizations of associated labor and a working community of shared services. Today, MSSŠ in Tuzla has 33 classes and 809 students and educates students for eight professional titles and 5 different professions.
