= Secondary Medical School, Tuzla =

- Srednja medicinska škola Tuzla

Location
- Fra Grge Martića 5 Tuzla; Bosnia and Herzegovina
- Coordinates: 44°32′18.4″N 18°40′15.6″E

Information
- Type: Public, Co-educational
- Founded: 1954
- Principal: Abid Begović
- Teaching staff: 70+
- Enrollment: 1449
- Average class size: 44
- Language: Bosnian, Croatian, Serbian
- Colours: Red and white
- Website: smstz.skolatk.edu.ba

The Secondary Medical School (Srednja medicinska škola) is a four-year high school in Tuzla that prepares and qualifies students for immediate work in health institutions, as well as for continuing education in colleges and higher education institutions. It was founded April 7, 1954. Classes are held in the Bosnian language. There is great interest in this school, considering the attractiveness of such professions and their employment opportunities, and also for the opportunity of continuing study at the medical faculty (college) at the University of Tuzla.
