= Zijad Lugavić =

Bosnian politician (born 1973)

32nd Mayor of Tuzla
- Incumbent
- Assumed office 1 December 2022
- Preceded by: Jasmin Imamović

Personal details
- Born: 15 October 1973 (age 53) Tuzla, SR Bosnia and Herzegovina, SFR Yugoslavia
- Party: Social Democratic Party
- Children: 2
- Education: University of Tuzla (BEc, MEc, DSS)

Zijad Lugavić (born 15 October 1973) is a Bosnian politician serving as the 32nd mayor of Tuzla since December 2022. He is a member of the Social Democratic Party.

Born in 1973, Lugavić graduated in economics from the University of Tuzla. He worked in administrative bodies and in the real sector before getting elected mayor of Tuzla.

== Early life and education ==
Lugavić was born on 15 October 1973 in Tuzla, SR Bosnia and Herzegovina, SFR Yugoslavia. He graduated from the Faculty of Economics at the University of Tuzla in 2000. He obtained his master's degree from the Private Faculty Travnik in 2014, and the title of Doctor of Social Science in the field of economics in 2020.

Lugavić was part of the Army of the Republic of Bosnia and Herzegovina during the Bosnian War in the 1990s. Following the war and his undergraduate studies, he worked in administrative bodies and as an interpreter in a number of international organizations, before moving to the real sector.

== Political career ==
Lugavić is a member of the Social Democratic Party. When Jasmin Imamović, long-time mayor of Tuzla, got elected to the national House of Representatives in the 2022 general election, he was forced to resign as mayor. Following his resignation, Lugavić, a close associate of Imamović, was unanimously elected by the city council as the acting mayor on 1 December 2022.

Early elections to elect a new mayor of Tuzla to a full term were held on 5 February 2023. In the election, Lugavić was elected with 47.77%, a plurality of the vote. In the 2024 municipal elections, he was re-elected as mayor in a landslide, obtaining 75.38% of the vote.

== Personal life ==
Lugavić is married and has two children. He lives with his family in Tuzla.

Political offices
Preceded by Jasmin Imamović	Mayor of Tuzla; 2022–present	Incumbent
