= Dženana Šehanović =

Bosnian classical pianist

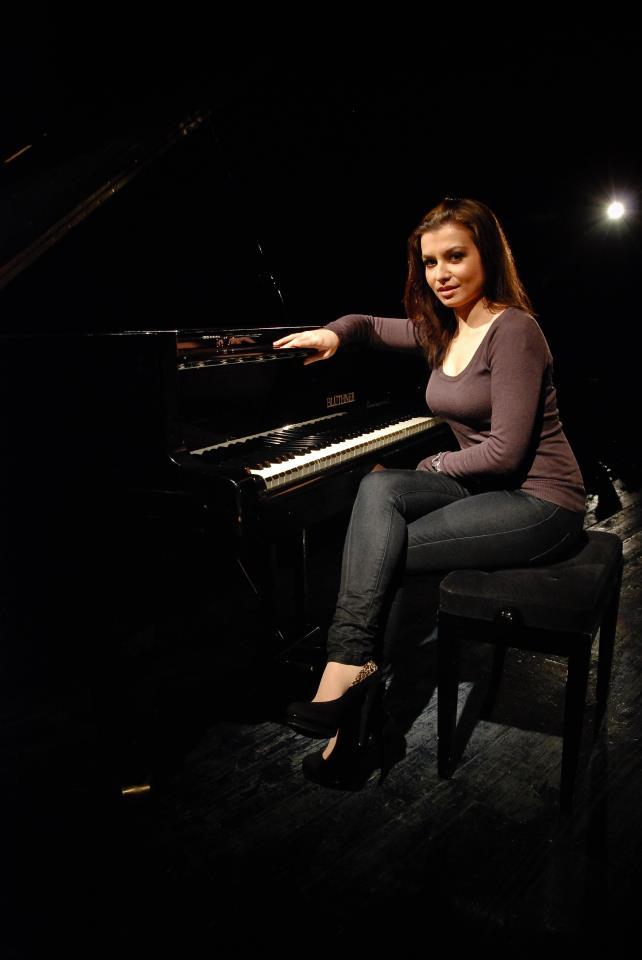
- Born: Brčko, SR Bosnia and Herzegovina, Yugoslavia
- Occupation: pianist

Dženana Šehanović (born 23 March 1991) is a Bosnian piano professor and a professional pianist. She holds a master's degree in piano performance.

== Education ==
She studied music in Germany, Austria, Croatia, and her home-country of Bosnia and Herzegovina. At the age of fourteen, she was the youngest ever student to enter the Music Academy of the University of Zagreb, Croatia. Her first year of study was completed in the class of professors George Stanetti and Karl-Heinz Kammerling. She graduated in 2010, in the class of Srdjan Čaldarović, and one year later, she earned her master's degree in piano performance from the Music Academy of the University of Zagreb.

She has given numerous solo concerts across Europe, including Bosnia and Herzegovina, Slovenia, Serbia, Croatia, Austria, Germany, Italy, Norway, Hungary, and Liechtenstein, as well as group performances with the Sarajevo Philharmonic Orchestra and the Zagreb Soloists. In 2010, on the basis of her fifteen international awards, Šehanović received the Rector's Award of the University of Zagreb. At the recommendation of the former President of Croatia, Stjepan Mesić, she additionally acquired Croatian citizenship.

== Selected performances ==
Étude op. 10, no. 4 (F. Chopin)

Études d'exécution transcendante no. 10 (F. Liszt)

Fantaisie in f-minor, op. 49 (F. Chopin)
