= List of mayors of Tuzla =

Mayor of Tuzla
- Gradonačelnik Tuzle
- Coat of arms of Tuzla
- Incumbent; Zijad Lugavić since 1 December 2022
- Appointer: Direct popular vote
- Term length: Four years, renewable
- Inaugural holder: Mehaga Imširović
- Formation: 1878
- Salary: 1,973 EUR per month
- Website: City of Tuzla website

This is a list of people who have served as mayor or president of the city council of the city of Tuzla, the third largest city in Bosnia and Herzegovina. Tuzla has had 32 different mayors since the position was created in 1878, upon Austro-Hungarian occupation.

== History ==
The first mayor of Tuzla, Mehaga Imširović, held the post from the Austrian occupation in 1878 until 1885.

The second and third mayors, Ibrahim-beg Džindo and Mujaga Hadžiefendić, served two nonconsecutive terms each from 1889 to 1903. The first power plant in the city was opened during the tenure of Hadžiefendić, which was then only sufficient for street lighting. In the years that the 19th mayor Salih Atić served (1956–63), Tuzla saw significant development and became the economic and sports center of northeastern Bosnia.

The current, 32nd mayor of the city is Zijad Lugavić; he has been serving since 2 December 2022.

== Mayors ==
Yugoslav Muslim Organization League of Communists Social Democratic Party

#	Portrait	Name (Born–Died)	Term of Office		Party
1		Mehaga Imširović	1878	1885	
2		Ibrahim-beg Džindo	1885	1889	
3		Mujaga Hadžiefendić	1889	1893	
(2)		Ibrahim-beg Džindo (1821–1897)	1893	1897	Yugoslav Muslim Organization
(3)		Mujaga Hadžiefendić	1897	1903	Yugoslav Muslim Organization
4		Ibrahim-beg Jašarević	1903	1908	
5		Osman Vilović (1878–1944)	1908	1922	Yugoslav Muslim Organization
6		Šefkija Gluhić (1878–1927)	1922	1924	
7		Lutvi-beg Sijerčić	1924	1931	
8		Murad-beg Zaimović	1931	1935	
9		Hasanaga Pašić (1874–1950)	1935	1941	
10		Sead-beg Kulović (1897–1945)	1941	1942	
11		Ćazimaga Žunić	1942	1943	
12		Ljubomir Peleš	1943	1943	
13		Pero Eraković	1944	1944	
14		Ferhat Azabagić	1944	1948	KP BiH
15		Asim Mujkić	1948	1950	KP BiH
16		Muharem Fizović (1917–1951)	1950	1951	KP BiH
17		Rade Jakšić	1952	1954	KP BiH renamed in 1952 to SK BiH
18		Ahmed Ćatić	1954	1956	SK BiH
19		Salih Atić (1923–2010)	1956	1963	SK BiH
20		Šefket Kunosić (1927–2009)	1963	1967	SK BiH
21		Mehmedalija Džambić	1967	1973	SK BiH
22		Mišo Vokić	1973	1974	SK BiH
23		Urfet Vejzagić (d. 2011)	1974	1978	SK BiH
24		Hasan Dervišbegović (1943–2004)	1974	1982	SK BiH
25		Dušan Tešanović (born 1936)	1982	1983	SK BiH
26		Emina Zaimović (1940–2022)	1983	1985	SK BiH
27		Aleksandar Todorović (1929–2017)	1985	1986	SK BiH
28		Džemal Hadžiavdić (1938–2015)	1986	1988	SK BiH
29		Mirza Muradbegović (b. 1936)	1988	1990	SK BiH
30		Selim Bešlagić (b. 1942)	December 1990	February 2001	SDP BiH
31		Jasmin Imamović (b. 1957)	February 2001	1 December 2022	SDP BiH
32		Zijad Lugavić (b. 1973)	1 December 2022	Incumbent	SDP BiH

== See also ==
- History of Tuzla
