= Vladimir Valjarević =

Serbian musician (born 1973)

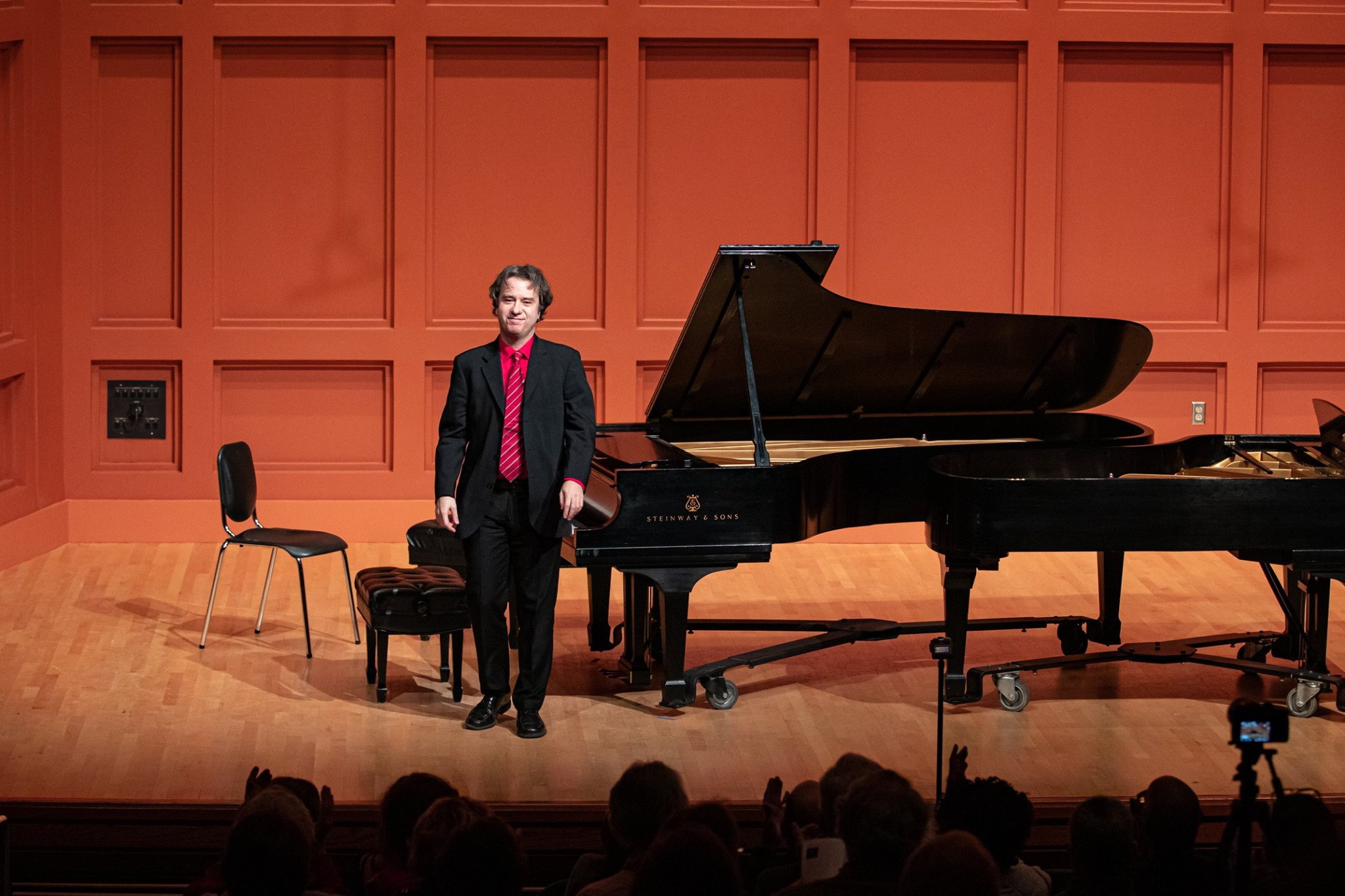

Vladimir Valjarević (born 1973, Tuzla, SR Bosnia and Herzegovina, Yugoslavia), is a Serbian/American piano pedagogue, currently residing in New York City, United States.

== Career ==
Valjarević is on the piano faculty at the Mannes School of Music and Mason Gross School of the Arts at Rutgers University.

He has served on the piano and chamber music faculties at the Beijing International Music Festival and Academy and Xi'An Music Festival in China, the Mannes International Piano Festival, the Round Top Festival in Texas, and the International Institute for Young Musicians in Kansas.

As a performer, Valjarevic has appeared at the National Center for the Performing Arts in Beijing, Sumida Triphony Chamber Hall in Tokyo, Leiszhalle in Hamburg, Conservatory Hall in Geneva, Heilig-Kreuz-Kirche in Berlin, Concert Hall "Bulgaria" in Sofia, Conservatory of Music in San Juan, Puerto Rico, the Manchester Music Festival in Vermont, the Southwest Virginia Festival for the Arts, French and Swiss Embassies in Washington, D.C. In New York, he has performed at Bargemusic, "Concerts at One" at Trinity Church, the "Meet the Virtuoso" at the 92nd Street Y, the Weill Recital Hall at Carnegie Hall, Merkin Hall, Steinway Hall, the Yamaha Salon, The United Nations, and the New School's Tishman Auditorium, among others. Valjarevic has concertized extensively as a member of the Kaleidos Duo, with violinist Miroslav Hristov and The Hudson Piano Trio.

Born in Bosnia and Herzegovina, Valjarevic received his initial music education in Tuzla as a student of Planinka Jurisic-Atic. He earned his bachelor's and master's degrees with honors at Mannes School of Music as a student of Pavlina Dokovska. Valjarevic received a doctoral degree from the Mason Gross School of the Arts at Rutgers University, where he studied with Susan Starr and received the Saldarini Scholarship Award. Upon graduation, he was presented with the Elizabeth Wyckoff Durham Award for Excellence in Keyboard Studies. After winning a Fulbright Scholarship and Swiss Arts Government Grant, Valjarevic studied at the Geneva Conservatory in Switzerland under the tutelage of Pascal Devoyon. While in Geneva, he received chamber music instruction from Jean Jacques Balet and clavichord lessons from Nicole Hostettler at the Centre de Musique Ancienne. He has attended music festivals including IMS Prussia Cove in England, the American Conservatory in Fontainebleau, France, the Apeldoorn Festival in The Netherlands, the International Festival-Institute at Round Top in Texas, The International Keyboard Institute and the Beethoven Institute in New York, Kneisel Hall in Maine.
