= Tuzla =

- City
- Grad Tuzla; City of Tuzla
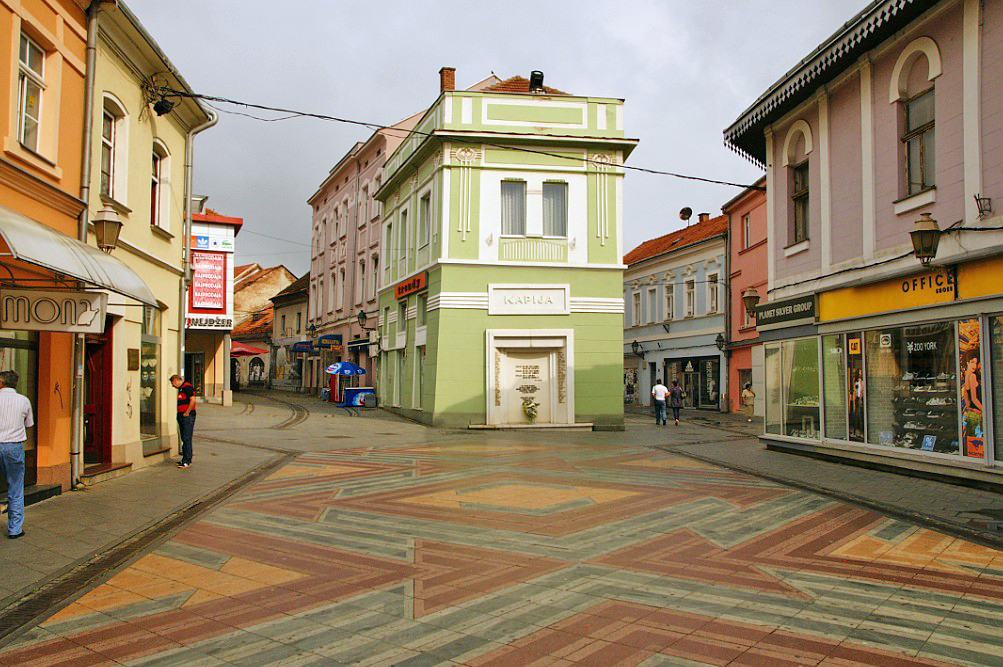
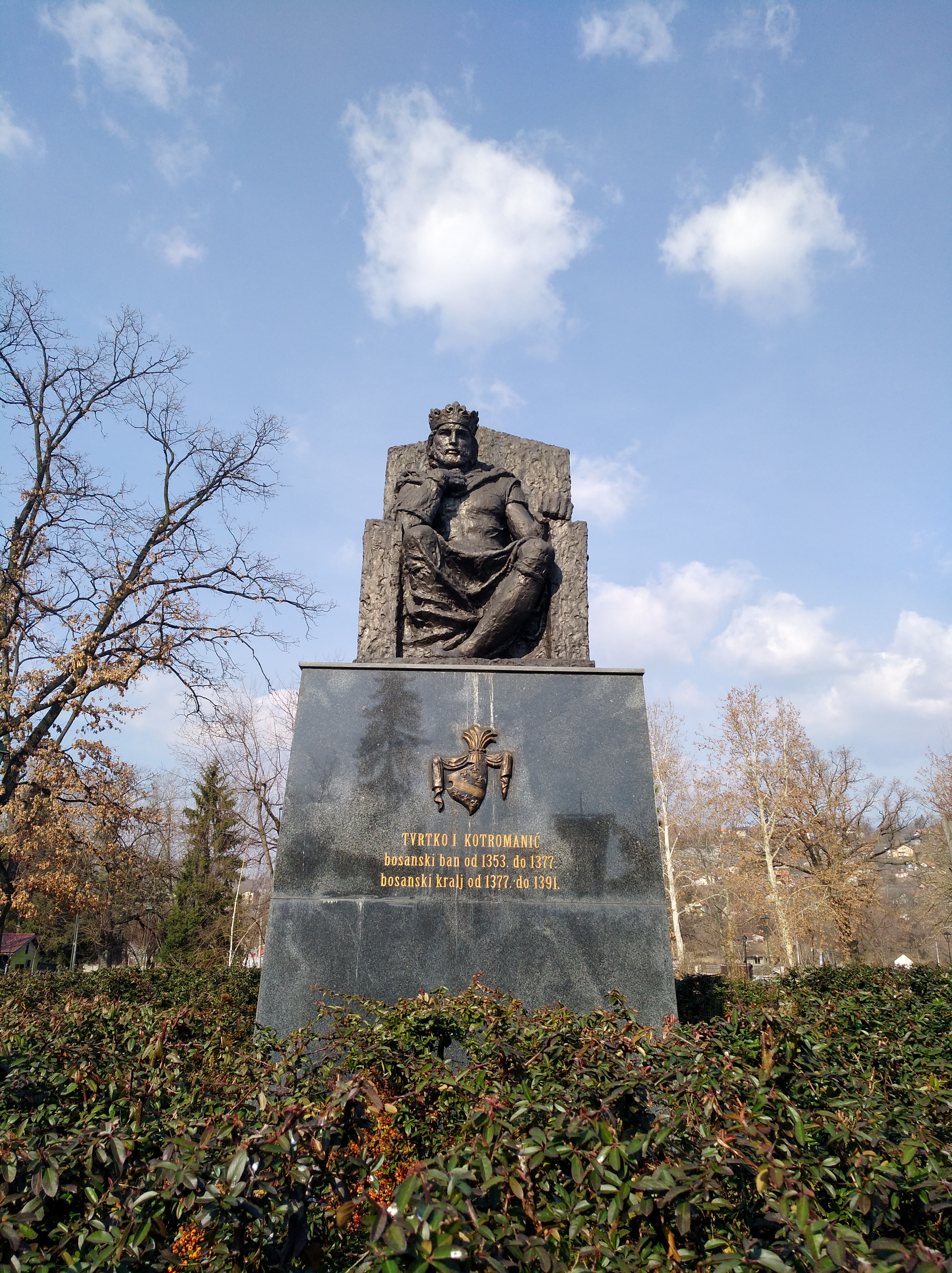
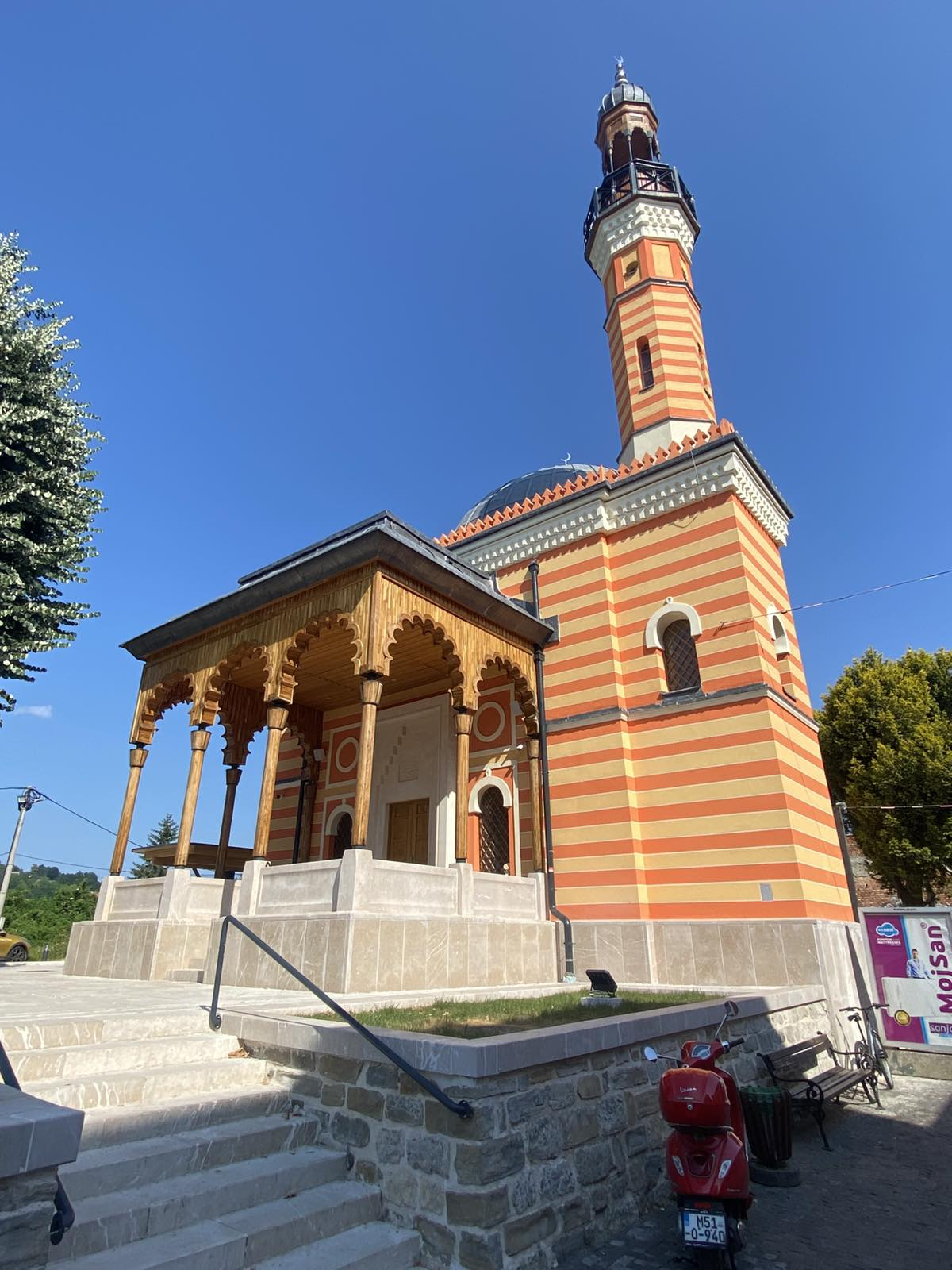
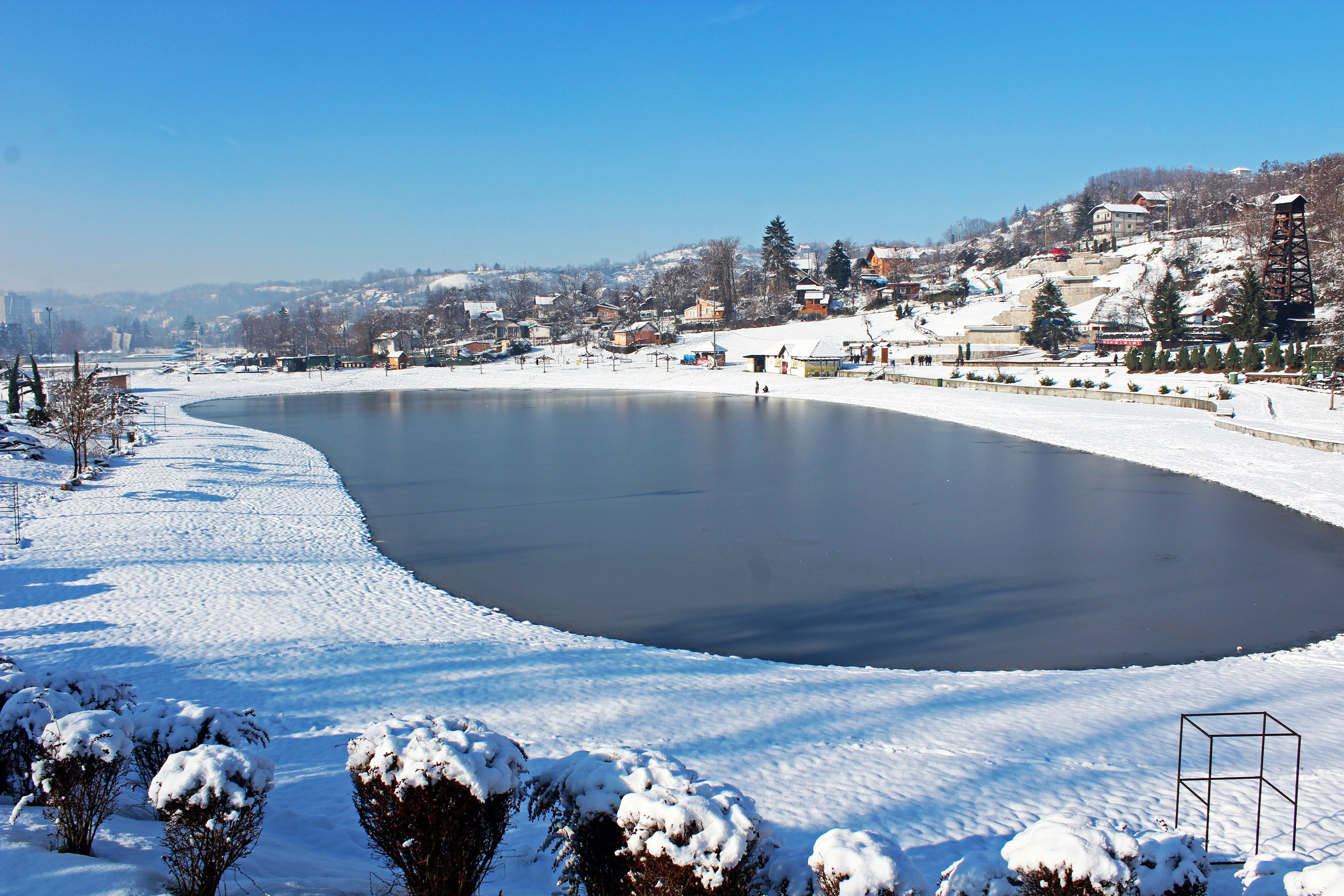
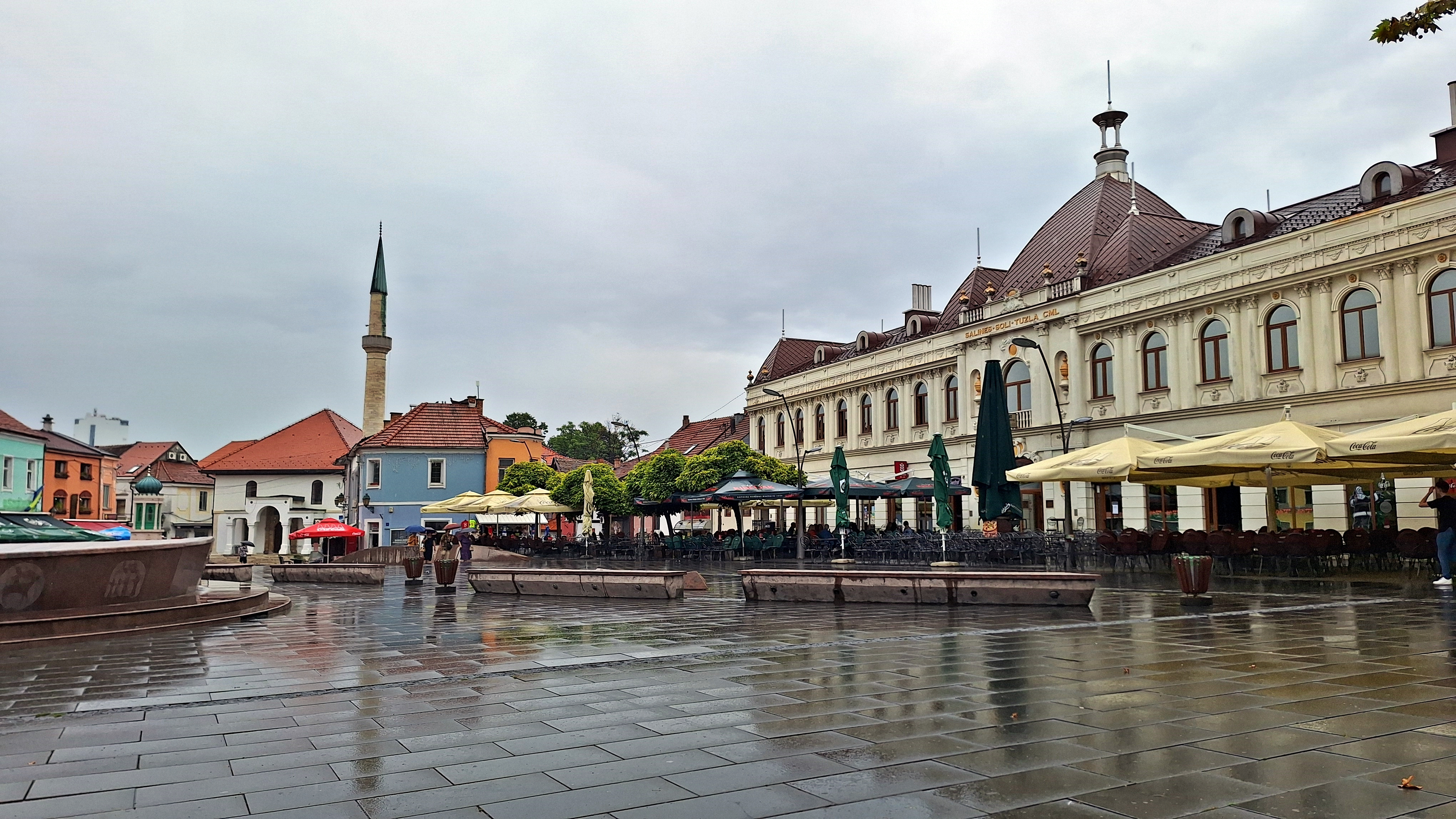
- Kapija memorial Square Monument to Tvrtko I Atik Behram Bey Mosque Pannonian Lakes Freedom Square

- Flag Coat of arms

- Location of Tuzla within Bosnia and Herzegovina (dark blue)
- Interactive map of Tuzla
- Coordinates: 44°32′17″N 18°40′34″E
- Country: Bosnia and Herzegovina
- Entity: Federation of Bosnia and Herzegovina
- Canton: Tuzla

Government
  - Mayor: Zijad Lugavić (SDP BiH)

Area
  - City: 294 km^{2} (114 sq mi)
- Elevation: 245 m (804 ft)

Population (2018)
  - City: 110,979
  - Density: 377.5/km^{2} (978/sq mi)
  - Urban: 80,570
- Time zone: UTC+1 (CET)
  - Summer (DST): UTC+2 (CEST)
- Postal code: 75000
- Area code: +387 35
- Website: www.tuzla.ba

Tuzla (UK: /ˈtʊzlə/, US: /ˈtuːz-/, Bosnian pronunciation: [tûzla]) is the third-largest city of Bosnia and Herzegovina and the administrative center of Tuzla Canton of the Federation of Bosnia and Herzegovina. As of 2013, it has a population of 110,979 inhabitants.

Tuzla is the economic, cultural, educational, health, and tourist center of northeast Bosnia. It is an educational center and home to two universities. It is the main industrial machine and one of the leading economic strongholds of the country with a wide and varied industrial sector including an expanding service sector thanks to its salt lake tourism. Panonsko Lake, Europe's only salt lake and part of its central park has more than 350,000 people visiting its shores each year.

Tuzla's history is as old as the 9th century; the modern city dates back to 1510 when it became an important garrison town in the Ottoman Empire. In Bosnia and Herzegovina, Tuzla is also regarded as one of the most multicultural cities in the country and has managed to keep the pluralist character of the city throughout the Bosnian War and after, with Bosniaks, Serbs, Croats and a small minority of Bosnian Jews living in Tuzla.

== Etymology ==
The name Tuzla is the Ottoman Turkish word for salt mine, tuzla, and refers to the extensive salt deposits found underneath the city, mined for export as a large source of Ottoman tax revenue. Leveraging on their shared name, the city is twinned with Tuzla, a district in Istanbul, Turkey.

== History ==
=== Early history ===
Archaeological evidence suggests that Tuzla was a rich Neolithic settlement. Being inhabited continuously for more than 6,000 years, Tuzla is one of the oldest European sustained settlements. During the period of the Roman Republic (before the area was conquered by Rome), Tuzla (or Salines as it was then known) was ruled by the Illyrian tribe Breuci.

=== Middle Ages to 20th century ===
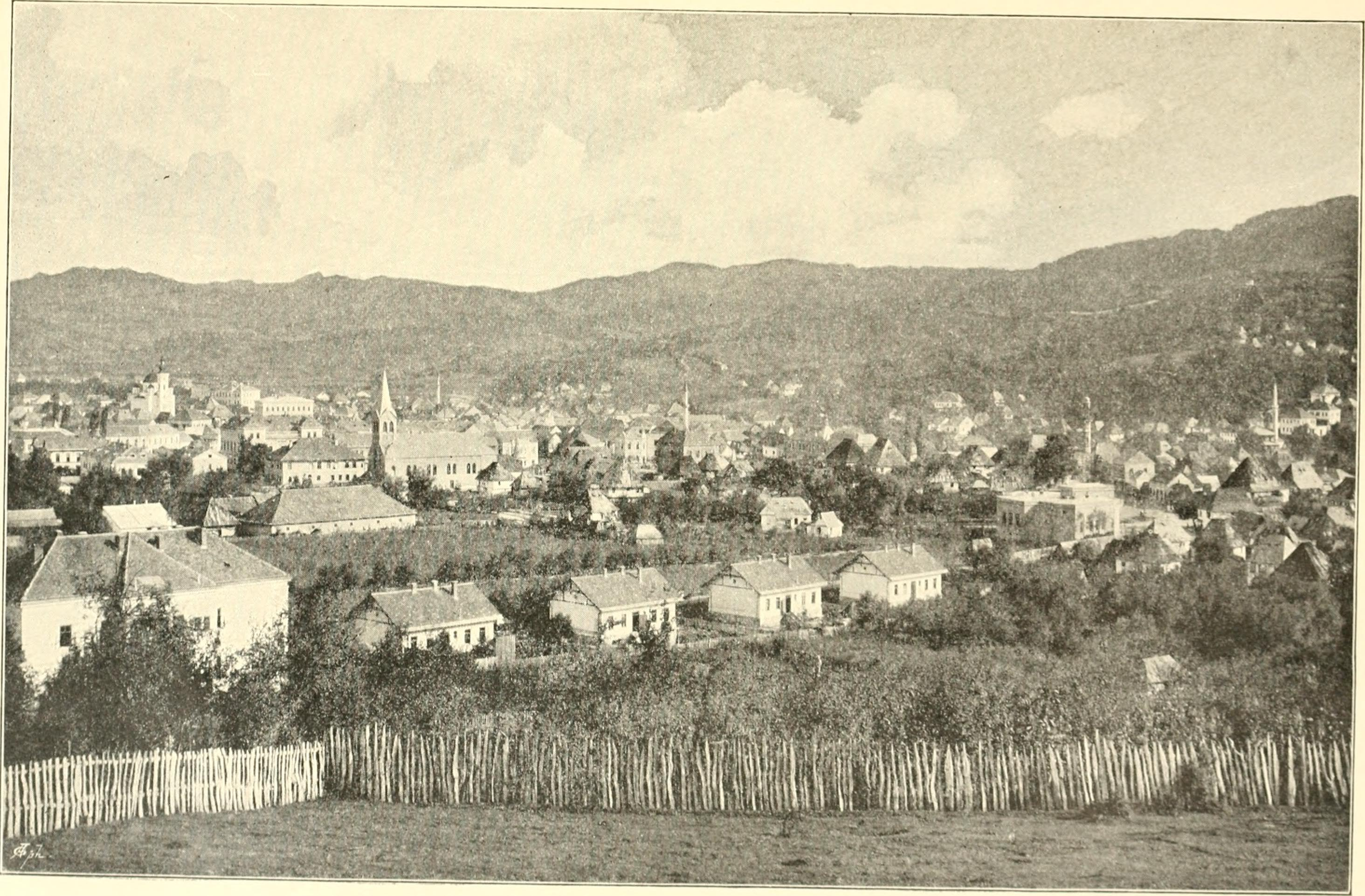
Tuzla in 1897

The city was first mentioned in 950 by Constantine Porphyrogenitus in his De Administrando Imperio as a fort named Salines (Greek: Σαλήνες). The name Soli was used in the Middle Ages. It means "salts" in Bosnian and the city's present name means "place of salt" in Ottoman Turkish. During the Middle Ages it belonged mostly to the medieval Kingdom of Bosnia.

After the fall of the kingdom to the Ottoman Empire in 1467, the region was controlled by the House of Berislavić before the Ottomans occupied the villages of "Gornje Soli" and "Donje Soli" around 1512, and took control of the entire Usora in the 1530s. It remained under Ottoman rule for nearly 400 years, where it was administered as part of the Sanjak of Zvornik. In 1878 it was occupied by Austria-Hungary. After the dissolution of the monarchy it became the part of the newly formed Kingdom of Yugoslavia. The Husino uprising took place in 1920.

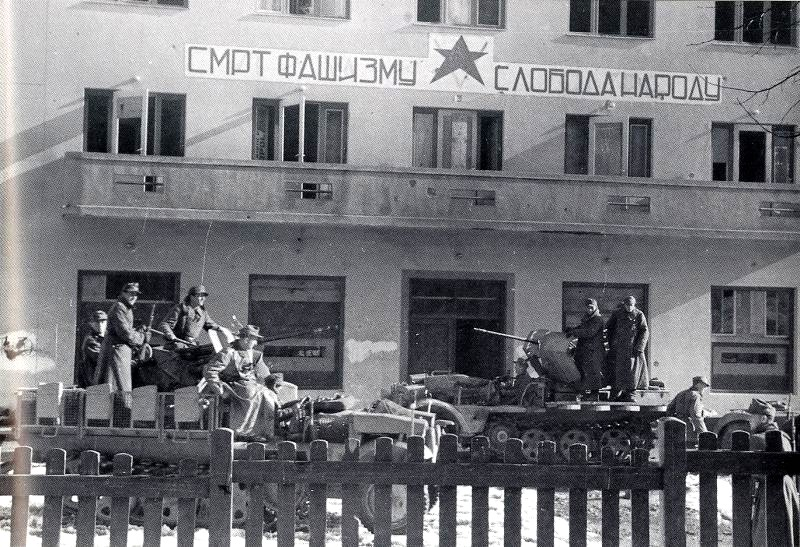
Shortly before Operation Kugelblitz, in November 1943 German troops of the 1. Gebirgs-Division mounted on (flak armed) half-tracks in front of the former partisan HQ (Hotel "Čajniče") in Tuzla after the city's re-capture from partisan forces. The partisan slogan "Death to fascism – freedom to the people" is written on the hotel facade.

During World War II, Tuzla was included in the puppet Independent State of Croatia and controlled by the mainly Muslim Hadžiefendić Legion of the Croatian Home Guard. Tuzla was among the first areas in Europe to be liberated, when Tito's Yugoslav Partisans freed it from the German occupiers on 2 October 1943. Many members of the Legion deserted to the Partisans at this time. In December 1944, the city was unsuccessfully attacked by Chetnik forces of Draža Mihailović along with the Serbian State Guard. After the war it developed into a major industrial and cultural center during the Communist period in the former Yugoslavia.

=== Bosnian War ===
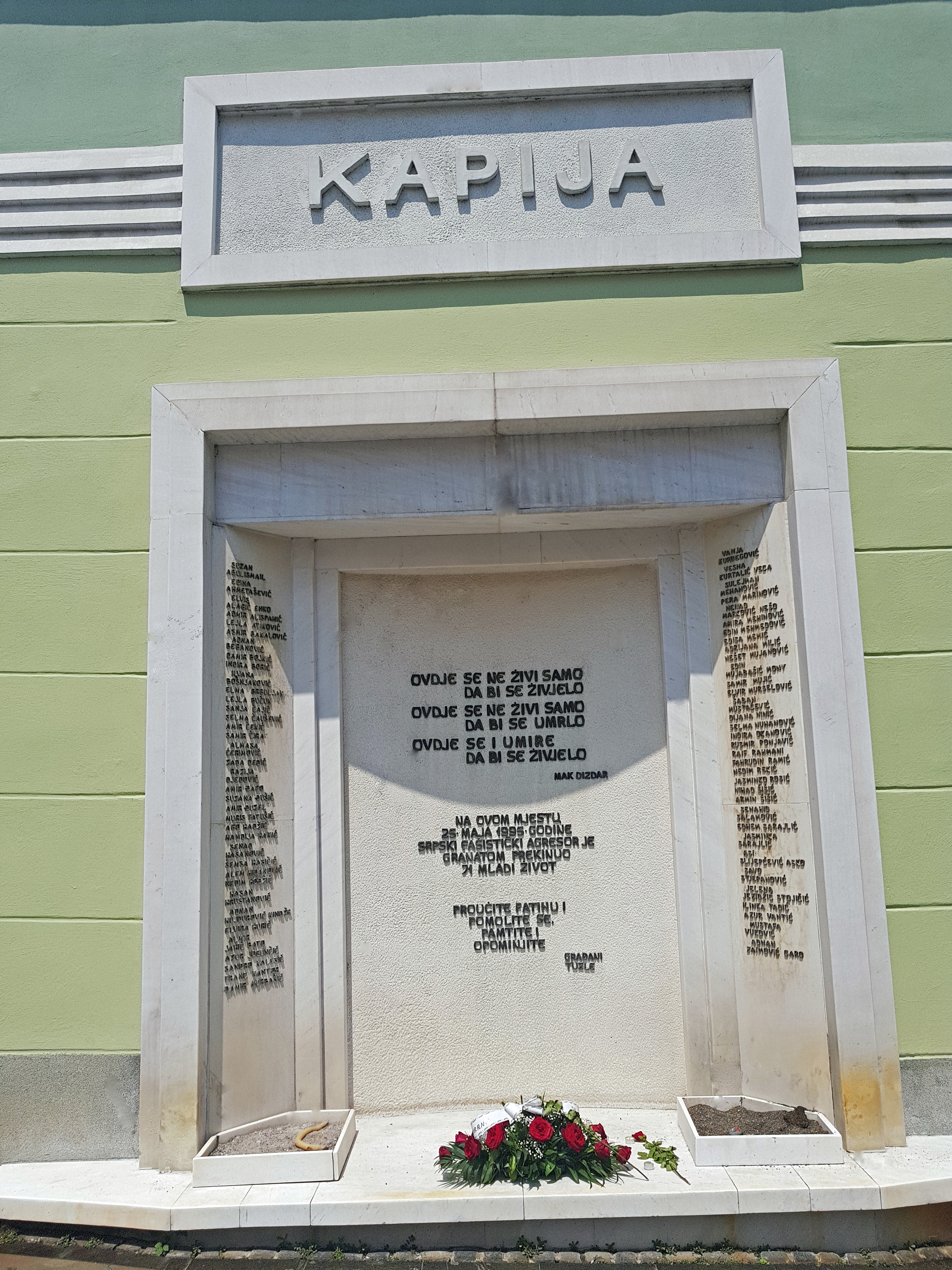
The Tuzla massacre memorial

In the 1990 elections the Reformists won control of the municipality, it being the only municipality in Bosnia where non-nationalists won. During the Bosnian War of Independence between 1992 and 1995 the town was the only municipality not governed by the SDA party-led authorities. After Bosnia and Herzegovina declared independence and was recognized by the United Nations, the city was besieged by Serbian forces. A few days later Serbian forces attacked Tuzla. The town was not spared the atrocities of the Bosnian War.

On 15 May 1992, troops of the 92nd Motorised Brigade of the Yugoslav People's Army were ambushed by units of Bosnia's Territorial Defence Force, while attempting to withdraw from the city. During the incident, 54 Yugoslav troops were killed and 44 were wounded. In 2009, Ilija Jurišić, a former Bosnian Croat officer, was sentenced to 12 years by a Serbian court for the attack before an appeals court acquitted him in 2015 citing a lack of evidence. On 25 May 1995, an attack on Tuzla killed 71 people and injured 200 persons in what is referred to as the Tuzla massacre, when shells fired from Serb's positions on the Ozren mountain (130 mm towed field gun M-46) hit the central street and its promenade. The youngest civilian who died in that massacre was only two years old. After the Dayton Peace Accords, Tuzla was the headquarters of the U.S. forces for the Multinational Division (MND) during Operation Joint Endeavour IFOR and subsequent SFOR.

=== Post-war independence ===
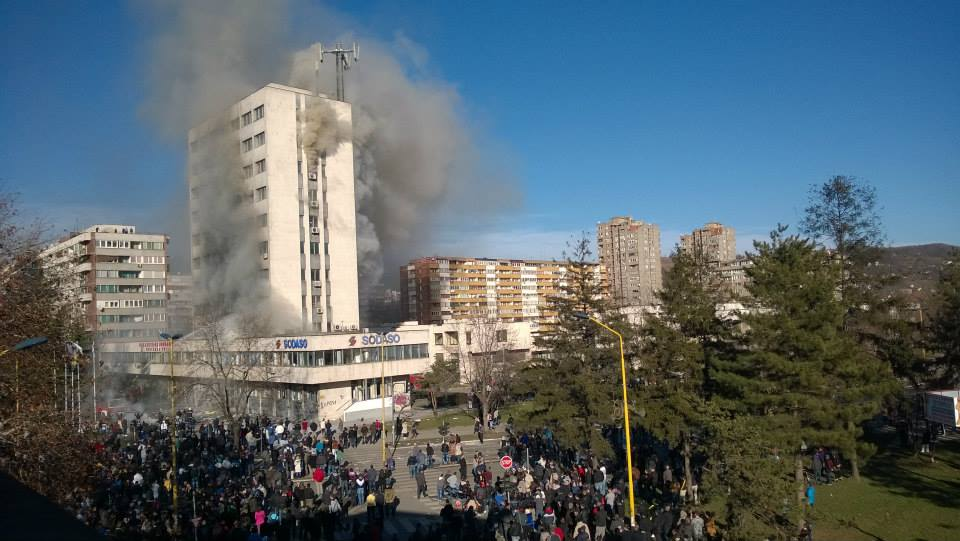
Tuzla Canton Government Building in flames during the 2014 unrest in Bosnia and Herzegovina

In February 2014, the city was the scene of the beginning of the 2014 unrest in Bosnia and Herzegovina, which quickly spread to dozens of cities and towns throughout Bosnia and Herzegovina. After a couple of days of calm protests, the protests started to become violent and people started burning cars in front of the canton government building, and later the building itself. More recently the city has had economic growth as well as an increase in tourism. As of May 2026, the building shown above, formerly the Tuzla Canton Government Building, is under reconstruction and restoration.

== Geography ==
Tuzla is in the northeastern part of Bosnia, settled just underneath the Majevica mountain range, on the Jala River. The central zone lies in an east–west oriented plain, with residential areas in the north and south of the city located on the Ilinčica, Kicelj and Gradina Hills. It is 237 metres (778 feet) above sea level. The climate is moderate continental. There are abundant coal deposits in the region around Tuzla. Six coal mines operate in the city area. Much of the coal mined in the area is used to power the Tuzla Thermal Power Plant, which is the largest power plant in Bosnia and Herzegovina.

=== Salt deposits ===
Extractions of the city's salt deposits, particularly in the 20th century, have caused sections of the city center to sink. Structures in the "sinking area" either collapsed or were demolished, and there are few structures in the city that predate the 20th century, despite the fact that the city was founded over 1000 years ago. In the northeastern part of the town is an area known as Solina, named after the salt deposits.

=== Pannonian Lakes ===
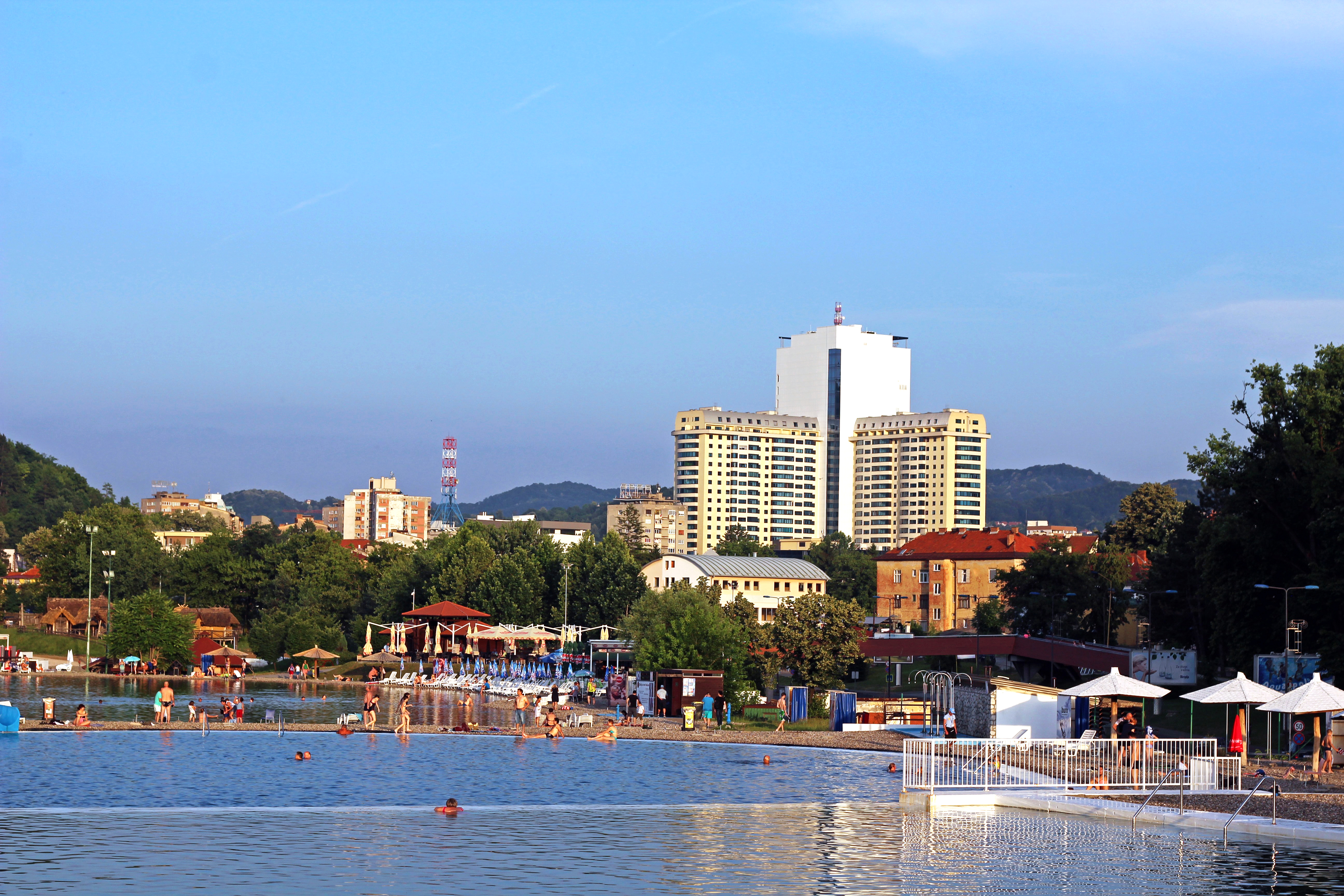
The Pannonian Lakes are artificial salt lakes

Tuzla is the only city in Europe which has a salt lake in its center. The ancient Pannonian Sea dried up around 10 million years ago, but work by researchers and scientists has now enabled a level of saline water to be kept stable at the surface, and in 2003 the Pannonian Lake was opened. A second lake which includes artificial waterfalls was inaugurated in 2008. An archaeological park and replica Neolithic lake dwellings were also incorporated into the scheme, providing information about the different cultures which left their material and spiritual mark here. The site has become an international tourist destination.

A third lake was completed in August 2012. Construction expenses for this were nearly 2 million Bosnian marks (c. 1 million euros). This third lake also contains 2 water slides which are an attraction for the younger population. The summer season of 2013 recorded approximately 5,000 visitors per day (c. 450,000 for 3 months).

== Climate ==
Tuzla has a temperate oceanic climate (Köppen climate classification Cfb) with warm summers which have 100.6 days annually with maximum temperature above 25 °C (77 °F) 36.3 days above 30 °C (86 °F). Tuzla has cold and chilly winters, with 85.8 days having minimum temperature below 0 °C (32 °F), as well as 14.9 days in which the maximum temperature is also below freezing.

There are 38.7 days per year with thunder and 2.1 days with hail, both of them being more common in spring and summer than other seasons. The highest recorded temperature is 40.7 °C (105.3 °F) on 22 July 2007.

Climate data for Tuzla (1991–2020, extremes 1961–2020) (Note: Afternoon humidity measured at 14:00 local time)
Month	Jan	Feb	Mar	Apr	May	Jun	Jul	Aug	Sep	Oct	Nov	Dec	Year
Record high °C (°F)	21.0 (69.8)	25.3 (77.5)	30.0 (86.0)	33.0 (91.4)	34.2 (93.6)	37.2 (99.0)	40.7 (105.3)	40.5 (104.9)	38.2 (100.8)	31.0 (87.8)	26.6 (79.9)	21.6 (70.9)	40.7 (105.3)
Mean maximum °C (°F)	12.7 (54.9)	14.0 (57.2)	17.7 (63.9)	23.5 (74.3)	26.2 (79.2)	30.4 (86.7)	31.8 (89.2)	33.1 (91.6)	28.6 (83.5)	22.7 (72.9)	17.9 (64.2)	9.7 (49.5)	33.1 (91.6)
Mean daily maximum °C (°F)	5.5 (41.9)	8.2 (46.8)	13.1 (55.6)	18.2 (64.8)	22.6 (72.7)	26.1 (79.0)	28.3 (82.9)	28.8 (83.8)	23.5 (74.3)	18.7 (65.7)	12.5 (54.5)	6.0 (42.8)	17.6 (63.7)
Daily mean °C (°F)	0.5 (32.9)	2.4 (36.3)	6.3 (43.3)	11.0 (51.8)	15.3 (59.5)	18.8 (65.8)	20.9 (69.6)	20.5 (68.9)	15.7 (60.3)	11.1 (52.0)	6.1 (43.0)	1.3 (34.3)	10.8 (51.5)
Mean daily minimum °C (°F)	−3.0 (26.6)	−2.1 (28.2)	1.3 (34.3)	5.2 (41.4)	9.4 (48.9)	13.2 (55.8)	14.5 (58.1)	14.4 (57.9)	10.3 (50.5)	6.3 (43.3)	2.5 (36.5)	−1.8 (28.8)	5.9 (42.5)
Mean minimum °C (°F)	−9.8 (14.4)	−8.0 (17.6)	−2.5 (27.5)	−0.3 (31.5)	7.1 (44.8)	10.7 (51.3)	12.4 (54.3)	12.4 (54.3)	8.1 (46.6)	2.7 (36.9)	−1.5 (29.3)	−6.4 (20.5)	−9.8 (14.4)
Record low °C (°F)	−25.8 (−14.4)	−22.0 (−7.6)	−17.9 (−0.2)	−6.6 (20.1)	−1.1 (30.0)	4.0 (39.2)	6.0 (42.8)	5.3 (41.5)	−1.0 (30.2)	−8.0 (17.6)	−13.0 (8.6)	−19.0 (−2.2)	−25.8 (−14.4)
Average precipitation mm (inches)	58.1 (2.29)	53.5 (2.11)	59.4 (2.34)	71.9 (2.83)	101.9 (4.01)	115.4 (4.54)	95.6 (3.76)	69.8 (2.75)	76.6 (3.02)	78.6 (3.09)	70.4 (2.77)	68.3 (2.69)	919.5 (36.2)
Average precipitation days (≥ 1.0 mm)	9.4	9.3	8.6	9.8	11.1	11.1	8.9	6.8	7.9	8.5	8.3	9.8	109.5
Average relative humidity (%)	80.9	75.9	68.6	67.9	71.6	71.9	70.7	70.9	75.6	78	79.3	82.8	74.5
Average afternoon relative humidity (%)	73	65	54	56	56	57	56	55	58	63	68	76	61
Mean monthly sunshine hours	71.9	96.3	147.3	176.1	215.9	231	261.9	258.3	182	148.4	88.9	62.7	1,940.7
Source 1: NOAA NCEI
Source 2: Deutscher Wetterdienst (extremes 1961–2015, afternoon humidity at 14:00, 1973–1993) (Note: Station ID for Tuzla is 14557; use this station ID to locate the sunshine duration.)

== Administration ==
Mellain Center, the third tallest building in Bosnia and Herzegovina, is located in Tuzla.

Tuzla is the seat of the Tuzla Canton, which is a canton of the Federation of Bosnia and Herzegovina, as well as of Tuzla Municipality, which is one of the 13 municipalities that together constitute the Tuzla Canton. Administratively, Tuzla is divided into 39 mjesne zajednice (local districts).

Apart from Tuzla, the municipality incorporates several other adjacent settlements, including the town of Gornja Tuzla (Upper Tuzla), as well as the villages of Husino, Par Selo, Simin Han, Obodnica, Kamenjaši, Plane, Šići and others.

The current mayor of Tuzla is Zijad Lugavić, of the Social Democratic Party (SDP BiH). He succeeded long-time mayor Jasmin Imamović in 2022.

The City council of Tuzla has 30 members, of the following parties:

- Independent – 12 members
- Social Democratic Party (SDP BiH) – 8 members
- Platform for Progress (PzP) – 2 members
- Tuzla Alternative – 2 members
- Party of Democratic Action (SDA) – 1 member
- Social Democrats (SD BiH) – 1 member
- Our Party (NS) – 1 member
- Croatian Democratic Union (HDZ BiH) – 1 member
- Party for Bosnia and Herzegovina (SBiH) – 1 member
- Movement of Democratic Action (PDA) – 1 member

== Demographics ==
Demographics in Tuzla municipality:

=== 1971 census ===
Total: 107,293

- 53,271 (49.65%) – Muslims
- 27,735 (25.84%) – Croats
- 21,089 (19.65%) – Serbs
- 2,540 (2.36%) – Yugoslavs
- 2,658 (2.47%) – others and unknown

=== 1981 census ===
Total: 121,717

- 52,400 (43.05%) – Muslims
- 24,811 (20.38%) – Croats
- 20,261 (16.64%) – Serbs
- 19,059 (15.65%) – Yugoslavs
- 5,186 (4.26%) – others and unknown

=== 1991 census ===
Total: 131,618

- 62,669 (47.61%) – Muslims
- 21,995 (16.71%) – Yugoslavs
- 20,398 (15.49%) – Croats
- 20,271 (15.40%) – Serbs
- 6,285 (4.77%) – others and unknown

=== 2013 census ===
Total: 110,979

- 80,774 (72.78%) – Bosniaks
- 15,396 (13.87%) – Croats
- 3,378 (3.04%) – Serbs
- 11,431 (10.30%) – others and unknown

== Culture ==
=== Arts ===
One of the most influential writers in the Balkans, Meša Selimović hails from Tuzla, and Tuzla hosts an annual book festival in July, where the "Meša Selimović award" for the best novel written in the languages of Bosnia and Herzegovina, Croatia, Serbia and Montenegro is presented. The first professional theater in Tuzla, the Tuzla National Theatre, was founded by the brothers Mihajlo and Živko Crnogorčević in 1898 during Austro-Hungarian rule, and is the oldest theatre in the country. The theatre is working continuously since 1944.

The Portrait Gallery has continuous exhibitions of work by local and international artists. The Ismet Mujezinović Gallery is mainly dedicated to Ismet Mujezinović, a painter from Tuzla. The Eastern Bosnia Museum exhibits archaeological, ethnological, historical and artistic pieces and artifacts from the whole region. An open-air museum at Solni Trg, opened in 2004, tells the story of salt production in Tuzla.

=== Religion ===
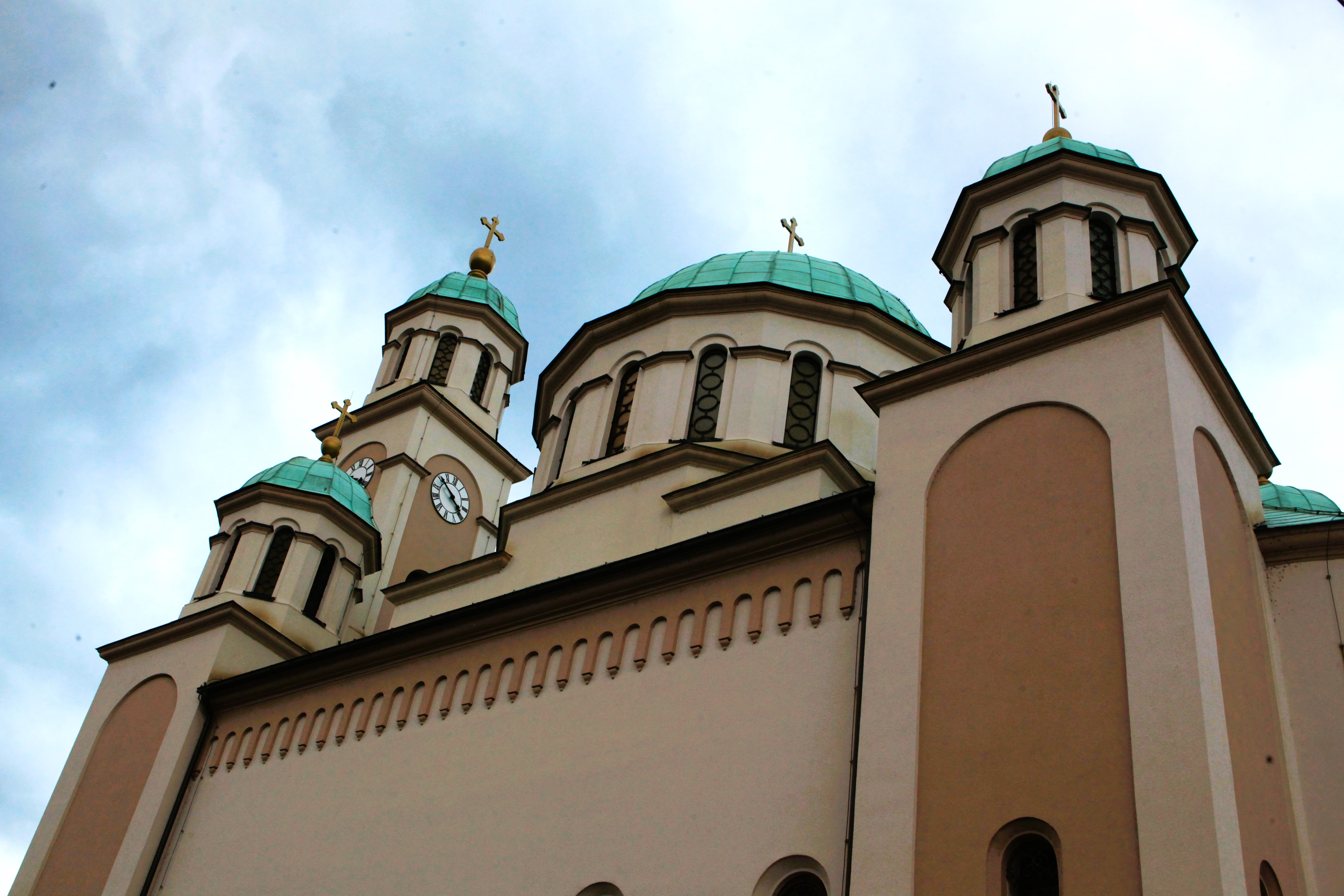
The Cathedral of the Dormition of the Theotokos, built in 1882

Apart from Tuzla's many mosques, there is an Orthodox church which was untouched throughout the war. The Franciscan monastery of "St. Peter and Paul" in town is still very active as there is a sizable Catholic community in Tuzla. The church of St.Francis (sv. Franjo) which had been demolished after being hit by a landslide in 1987 is being rebuilt since 2011 and should open by 2019. Just outside the town, in the nearby village of Breska, is a 200-year-old Catholic church. Tuzla is also home to an old Jewish cemetery which recently underwent renovations, organized by the OPEN Organization of Tuzla and the Jewish Municipality of Tuzla.

According to the 2013 census, 75.4% of the citizens living in Tuzla are Muslims, with Catholics accounting for 13.7%, while 3.3% of the population being Orthodox, 3.6% of people belong to other religions, and 3.9% of people are not religious.

=== Music ===
Bosnian roots music came from Middle Bosnia, Posavina, the Drina valley and Kalesija. It is usually performed by singers with two violinists and a šargija player. These bands first appeared around World War I and became popular in the 1960s. This is the third oldest music following after the sevdalinka and ilahija. The performers are self taught and the groups consist of mostly two or three members who use varying instruments such as the violin, sacking, saz, drums, flutes (zurle) or wooden flute. The songs are not written, they are carried through generations by ear. The music is thought to be brought from Persia-Kalesi tribe which settled in the area of present Sprecanski valleys and hence probably the name Kalesija. Again, it became the leader of First World War onwards, as well as 60 years in the field Sprecanski doline. This kind of music was enjoyed by all three ethnic groups in Bosnia; Bosniaks, Croats and Serbs; and it contributed a lot to reconcile people socializing, entertainment and other organizations, and festivals. In Kalesija it's performed each year during the Bosnian Festival.

Studio Kemix firm Dzemal Dzihanovic from Živinice together with other artists brought this kind of music at the end 20th century. With its new form of modernity, it is most common in the Tuzla Canton and the cradle of this music city Živinice was named Bosnian town of original music. Songs are performed in a diphthong, the first and second voice which is a secret performance of this music and some performers sing in troglasju as they do Kalesijski triple that was recorded in 1968, as the first written record of the tone on the album, along with Higurashi no naku.

=== Sports ===
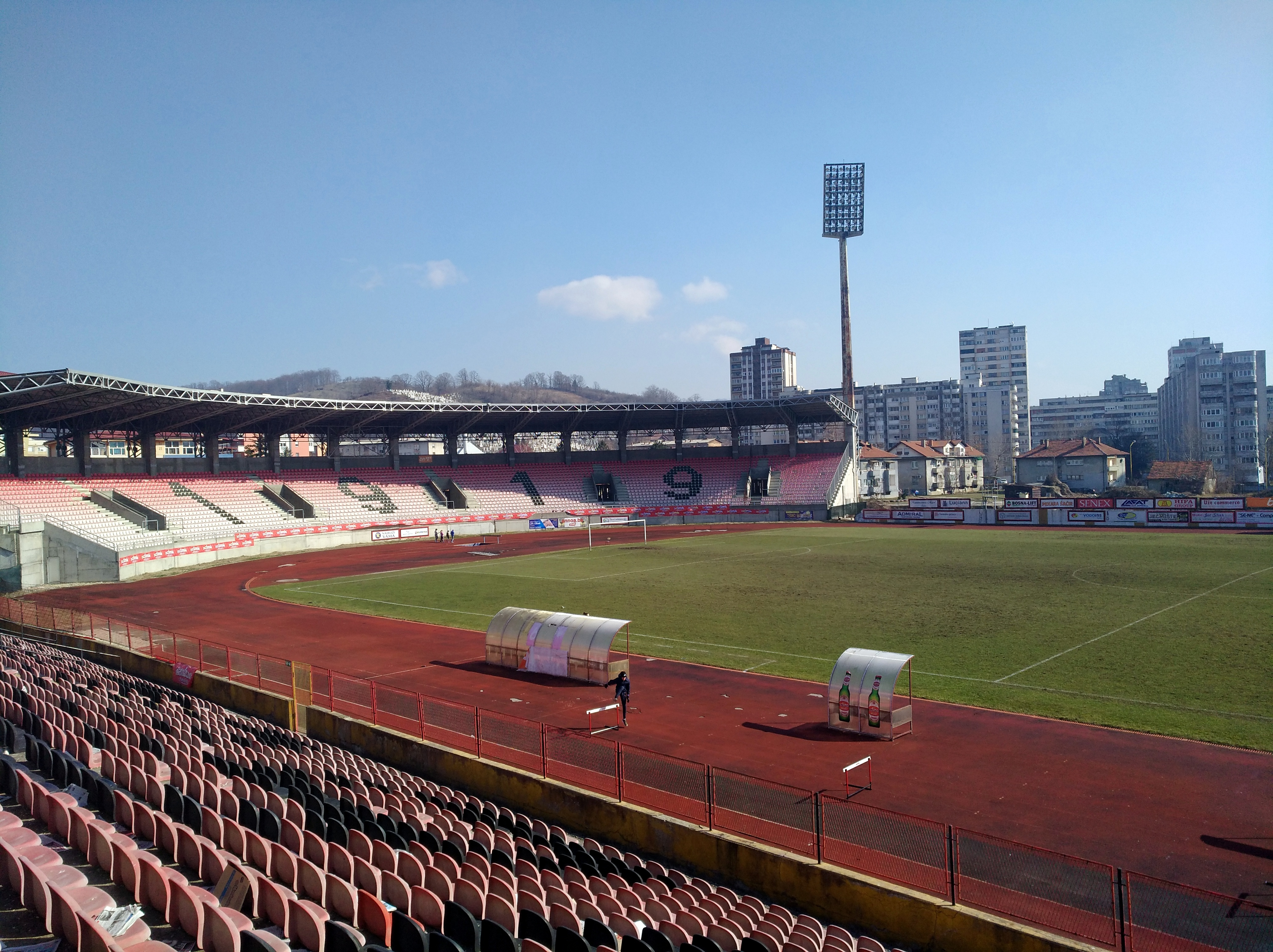
Tušanj City Stadium

Founded in 1927, the Workers Sports Society Sloboda became the first sporting organization in Tuzla. It has 14 member clubs. The city is home to two football clubs, FK Sloboda and FK Tuzla City. Both teams play their home games at the Tušanj City Stadium. OKK Sloboda basketball club and RK Sloboda handball club play their home games in the Mejdan Sports Arena which has a seating capacity of 4,900.

Jedinstvo Tuzla is the female counterpart to Sloboda. The women's basketball team Jedinstvo Aida won the FIBA Women's European Champions Cup, with the most famous sportswoman from Tuzla, Razija Mujanović. She was inducted to the FIBA Hall of Fame in 2017.

=== Miscellaneous ===
On 1 September 2007, 6,980 couples kissed for 10 seconds in Tuzla, erasing the previous Guinness World kissing Records of the Philippines and Hungary (for synchronised osculation in 2004 with 5,327 Filipino couples, overtaken by Hungary in 2005 with 5,875 couples; Filipinos came back in February 2010 with 6,124 couples but the Hungarians responded in June 2010 with 6,613 couples). The record now awaits official certification.

On 26 September 2008, Tuzla began offering free wireless internet access in the city center. On 7 May 2010, Tuzla attempted to break the world record for the world's largest mass waltz dance. It is estimated that over 1,521 couples danced together on the main city square.

== Transport ==
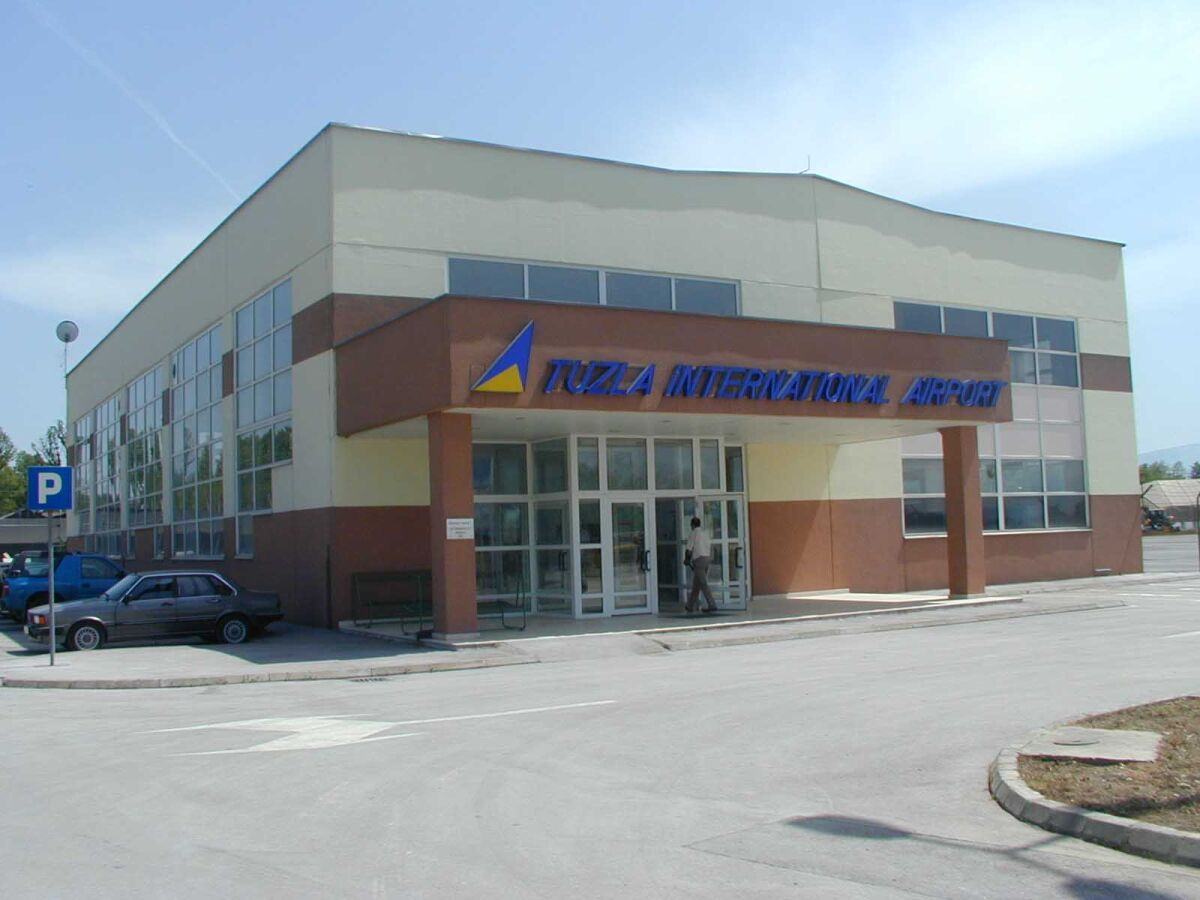
Tuzla International Airport

Tuzla has an international airport located at Dubrave (IATA code: TZL), and an effective and well-developed public bus network. There are plans to introduce a trolleybus network in the city.

The airport was opened and obtained ICAO certificate for civilian Air traffic in 2008. The airport had comprised a portion of "Eagle Base", an American military base that has been home to NATO troops serving in SFOR, Bosnia's stabilization force. Nowadays former Eagle Base become home of Bosnian Military Forces. In 2013. the airport became a base for Wizz Air. Tuzla International Airport nowadays has connection to 17+ European cities and expanding. More than 300,000 passengers have traveled via Tuzla International Airport in 2016. In 2017 the airport broke its own record for most passengers in one year with 535,596 passengers, and in 2018 that number rose up to 584.471.

Tuzla has a railway station that has passenger services to Doboj, from where trains ran to Sarajevo, Zagreb, Belgrade and Brčko. The services to Brčko were cancelled in 2012, on the other lines in 2019. Tuzla is well connected with other major cities in Bosnia and Herzegovina and even with some European cities via its bus connections. Bus and taxi traffic is very well organised in Tuzla and is affordable to its citizens. Bus stations were built in 1970 and completely renovated and modernized in 2017.

== Education ==
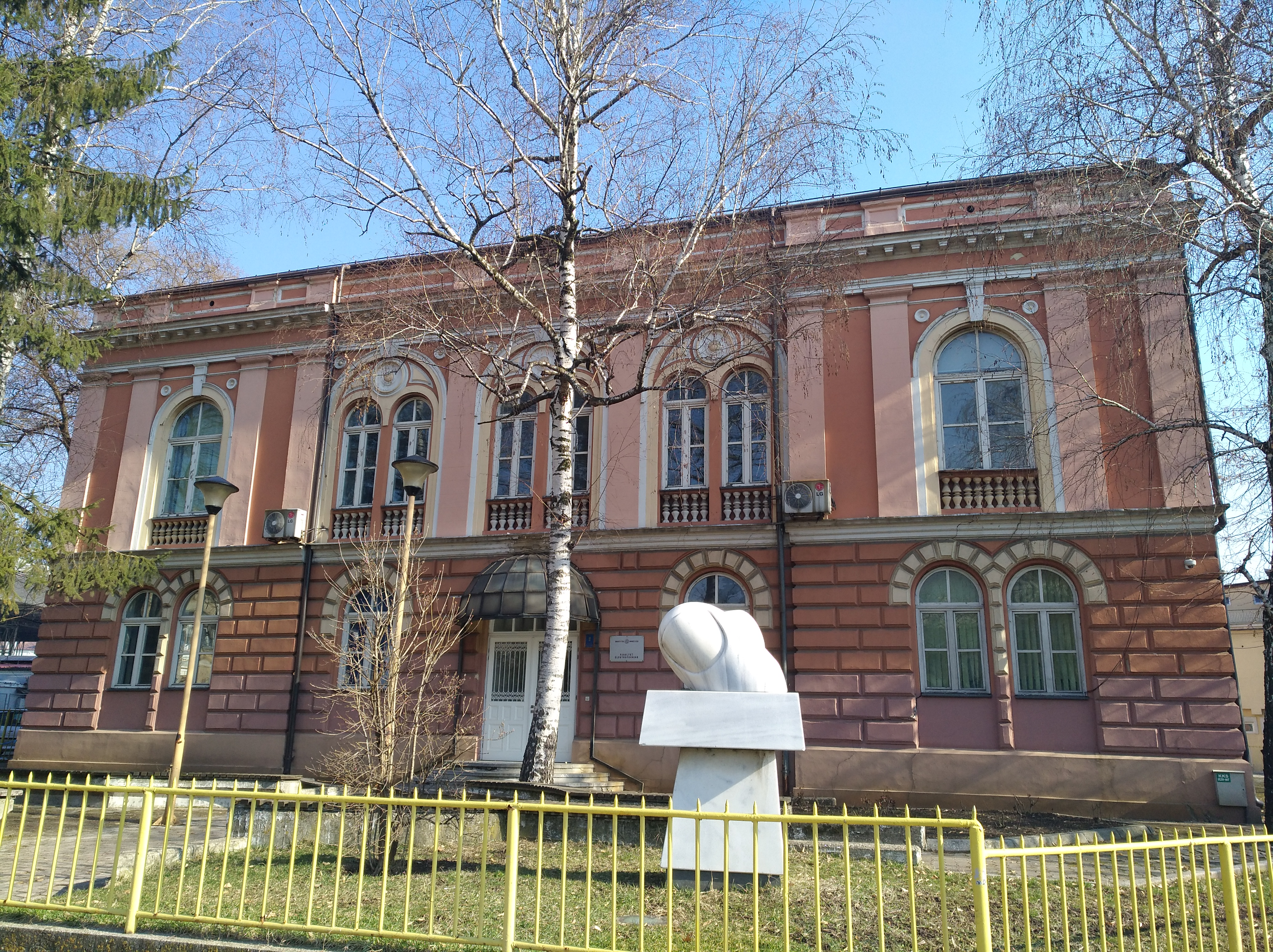
The Faculty of Electrical Engineering building, University of Tuzla

Tuzla is home to the public University of Tuzla, with 16,500 students, and also private FINra University, IPI Academy and Empirica faculty.

=== Universities ===
- University of Tuzla

=== Schools ===
- Citizen's Educational Center
- Behram-Begova Medresa
- Čestmir Mirko Dušek Secondary Music School
- Meša Selimović Gymnasium
- St. Francis Catholic School Center
- School of Economics and Trade
- Electrical Engineering School
- Secondary Medical School
- Combined Secondary Traffic School

== Notable people ==
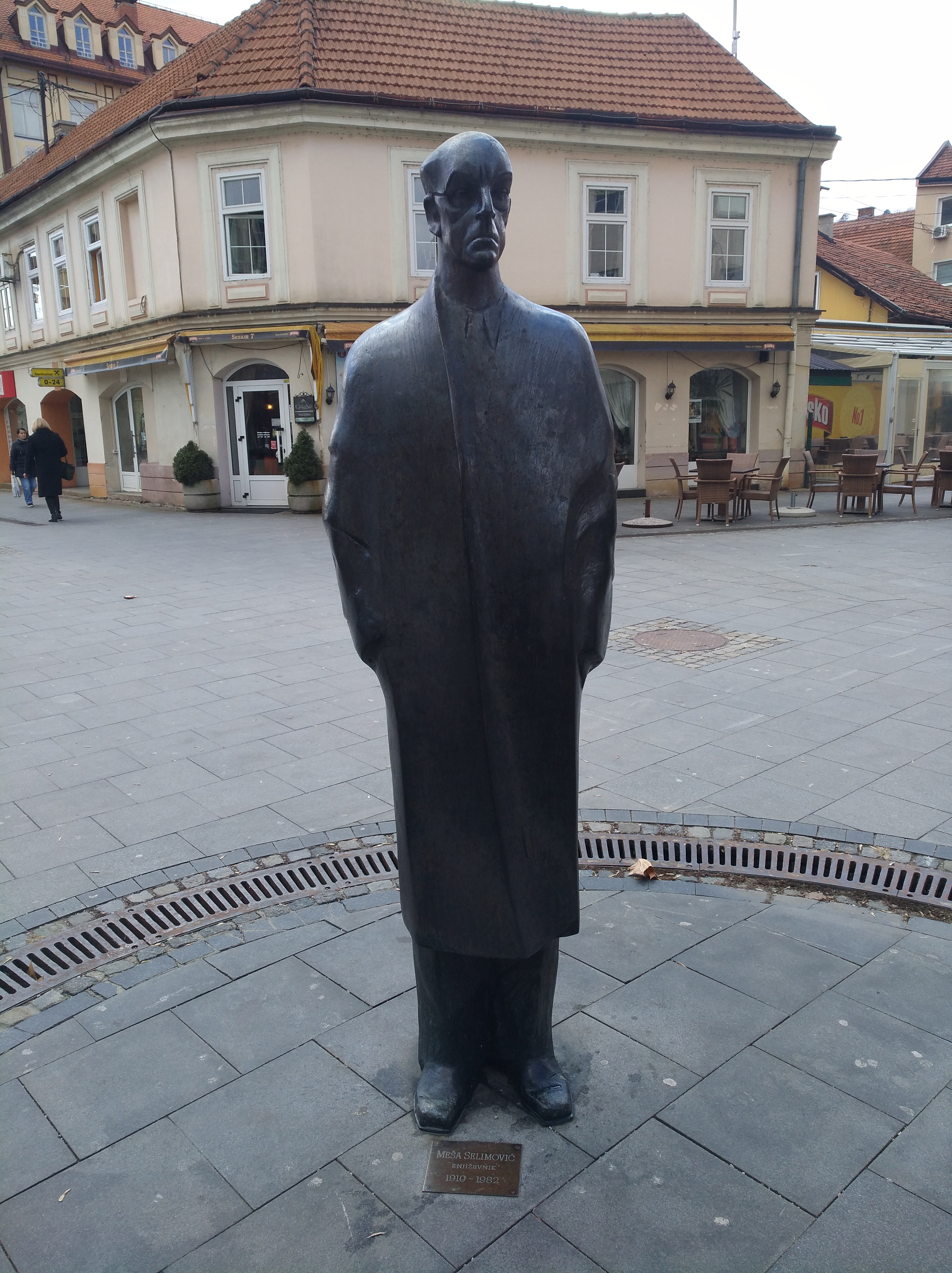
Statue of Meša Selimović

- Muhamed Hevaji Uskufi Bosnevi (1601–1651), writer, poet
- Mehmed Teufik Azabagić, Grand Mufti of Bosnia and Herzegovina (1893 to 1909)
- Muhamed Hadžiefendić (1898–1943), commander of Hadžiefendić Legion
- Meša Selimović (1910–1982), writer
- Franjo Herljević (1915–1998), general officer
- Nesim Tahirović (1941–2020), painter
- Mirza Delibašić (1954–2001), basketball player, Olympic, World and European champion, FIBA Hall of Fame member
- Lepa Brena (born 1960), singer
- Svetlana Dašić-Kitić (born 1960), retired handball player, Voted World Player of the Year 1988 by the International Handball Federation
- Emir Hadžihafizbegović (born 1961), actor
- Željko Hubač (born 1967), Serbian playwright and dramaturge
- Muhamed Konjić (born 1970), retired football player
- Denis Azabagić (born 1972), guitarist
- Damir Mulaomerović (born 1974), Croatian basketball player
- Selma Bajrami (born 1980), singer
- Siniša Martinović (born 1980), professional ice hockey player
- Maya Sar (born 1981), singer
- Amer Delić (born 1982), professional tennis player
- Emir Vildić (born 1984), musician
- Alma Zadić (born 1984), Austrian politician
- Andrea Petković (born 1987), German professional tennis player
- Milan Đurić (born 1990), footballer
- Miralem Pjanić (born 1990), footballer
- Andreja Pejić (born 1991), Australian model
- Jusuf Nurkić (born 1994), basketball player
- Nefisa Berberović (born 1999), Bosnian tennis player
- Zlatan Saračević, retired Olympic athlete, European Indoor Championships 1980 Sindelfingen gold winner in shot put
- Miroslav Tadić, musician
- Sándor Tátrai, Hungarian football player and manager

== International relations ==
=== Twin towns – sister cities ===
Tuzla is twinned with:

- Beşiktaş, Turkey
- Bologna, Italy
- L'Hospitalet de Llobregat, Spain
- Linz, Austria
- Osijek, Croatia
- Pécs, Hungary
- Saint-Denis, France
- Tuzla, Turkey

=== Partner cities ===
- Novi Sad, Serbia
