= FK BSK Ledinci =

- Full name: Fudbalski klub BSK Ledinci
- Dissolved: 2020
- Ground: , Batković
- League: Regional League
- 2007–08: Second League of Republika Srpska (Relegated)
Home colours	Away colours

FK BSK Ledinci (Serbian Cyrillic: ФК БCK Лeдинци) was a Bosnian-Herzegovinian football club based in Batković, City of Bijeljina, Republika Srpska.

== History ==
Ledinci had one season in the country's second tier-First League of the Republika Srpska, in 2003–04. The club ceased to exist in September 2020.

== Club seasons ==
Season	League									Cup	Europe
Season	Division	P	W	D	L	F	A	Pts	Pos	Cup	Europe
2003–04	First League of the Republika Srpska	30	9	5	16	34	50	32	16th ↓		
2014–15	Četvrta liga RS – Semberija	26	17	6	3	56	23	57	2nd ↑		
2015–16	Područna liga Bijeljina-Semberija	26	13	5	8	65	35	44	3rd		
