= Batković camp =

Prison camp in Bijeljina, Bosnia and Herzegovina

Batković prison camp
- Concentration camp
- Location within Republika Srpska Location within Bosnia and Herzegovina
- Coordinates: 44°51′13″N 19°11′47″E
- Location: Batković, Bijeljina, Bosnia and Herzegovina
- Operated by: Army of Republika Srpska; Bosnian Serb police
- Operational: 1 April 1992 – late January 1996
- Inmates: predominately Bosniaks, but also Croats
- Number of inmates: up to 4,000
- Killed: at least 6 (ICTY) c. 80 (Bosniak claim)
- Notable inmates: Sulejman Tihić, Fikret Malovčić

The Batković camp (Bosnian, Croatian and Serbian Latin: Logor Batković) was a prison camp operated between 1992 and 1996 by Republika Srpska authorities in Batković, a village in the municipality of Bijeljina, Bosnia and Herzegovina during the Bosnian War. It is believed to have been the first concentration camp of the Bosnian war, set up for Bosniak (Muslim) and Croat men, women and children, in an effort to ethnically cleanse the areas under Bosnian Serb control. Detainees were held in two large barns and tortured, deprived of food and water, forced to dig trenches, carry ammunition to the front lines, work in fields and factories and bury the dead. Prisoners were subject to daily beatings, sexual assault and forced to beat one another.

Although the camp is believed to have been established between 1 April and June 1992, its existence was only confirmed by foreign press in August 1992. The Human Rights Watch Group Helsinki Watch visited the camp twice in August 1992 and were allowed to interview detainees, most of whom were too scared to share any information about goings-on.

== Trials ==
In the indictment against former Bosnian Serb general Ratko Mladić, International Criminal Tribunal for the former Yugoslavia (ICTY) prosecutors claimed that at least 6 prisoners were murdered during the camp's operation, and that many others were raped or otherwise physically and psychologically abused. Bosniak sources maintain that as many as 80 inmates perished in the camp between 1992 and early 1996.

On 2 March 2012, the trial for four former Serb camp guards (Đoko Pajić, Petar Dmitrović, Đorđe Krstić, Ljubomir Mišić) began in a Bijeljina court. The four defendants were accused of abusing and beating Bosniak prisoners. Dmitrović was identified by witnesses as the camp commander, Pajić was identified as his successor, Krstić was identified as Pajić's replacement and Mišić was identified as commander of the guard. The trial was still ongoing two years later.

Another Serb, Gligor Begović, was arrested in Rogatica for war crimes on 28 April 2014. His trial began 26 November 2014. Begović was indicted for crimes committed against Bosniaks in Batković concentration camp in 1992. Begović is further accused of participating in beatings, together with other guards, which caused the deaths of several detainees. He was sentenced to 13 years in prison on 9 December 2015.

== Notable inmates ==
- Fikret Malovčić, singer
- Sulejman Tihić, politician
