= Isak Gasi =

Isak Gaši (born 1957 in Brčko, Yugoslavia), is a former Yugoslavian and Bosnian national canoeing team member and survivor of internment in the Luka Brčko death camp during the Bosnian War. He has given evidence about violence and atrocities perpetrated in Brcko at the International Criminal Tribunal for the Former Yugoslavia in the Hague at the trials of three of the most important war crimes indictees during the War, Slobodan Milošević, Momčilo Krajišnik and Radovan Karadžić.

== Pre-war biography ==
Isak Gasi lived in his place of birth, Brčko, up until the outbreak of the Bosnian War in 1992. He worked for the local electricity company in a position of managerial responsibility for the maintenance of the town's electrical infrastructure. Prior to the break-up of Yugoslavia, he represented Yugoslavia in kayaking at junior and senior level in world championships and international competitions.

== Outbreak of war and internment ==
Gasi was a member of the SDA, the Party of Democratic Action, which represented Brcko's majority Muslim population. He became a member of the local party organising committee for a brief period up until the 1990 multi-party elections, stipulating that he would be a free agent, that the work he did was of a public service nature and that he would not be drawn into party political activities. In his evidence to the ICTY Gasi described the establishment of a parallel Serb system of administration in the municipalities around Brcko, the ethnic politicisation of the town's municipal administration, the distribution of weapons by the JNA in outlying Serb villages, the desire of Serb politicians to divide the town into ethnically distinct areas, the outbreak of the war in Brcko on 30 April 1992, cooperation between the JNA (Yugoslav National Army), police and paramilitaries, street executions of civilians by police and men in JNA uniforms and balaclavas, concealed mass burials, brutalisation and killing of prisoners in the warehouses of the Luka Brcko camp on the premises of the river port of Brcko, and his own forced participation in the task of disposing of dead bodies in the River Sava.

== Release ==
After suffering brutal mistreatment, on 7 June Gasi was freed from the camp after Yugoslav sporting connections in Belgrade intervened with the notorious Dragan Vasiljković, "Captain Dragan". Kosta Simeunovic, the commander of the Luka camp, informed him of his release by telling him, "Isak, the time has come for you to start rowing again for Yugoslavia." Gasi described how as he was being taken away, his escort halted at a customs building where JNA units, Serbian MUP, Serbian special forces and Serbian Radical and Chetnik paramilitaries were stationed together, before proceeding on to Zvornik to hand him over to "Captain Dragan".

== Postwar canoeing activities ==
As a kayaker, Gasi paddles what has been described as the "most challenging and difficult of all racing paddled boat", the International Canoe Federation Canoe (ICF canoe) - competitors race paddling from a "high kneel" position at speeds higher than in the traditional North American racing canoe. Gasi has participated in the World Marathon Championships and also took part in the 2010 USA Canoe/Kayak Marathon Canoe/Kayak Marathon Team Trials (Trials) in Austin, Texas.
