= Contextual element of genocide =

Conceptual consideration in the adjudication of genocide charges

The contextual element of genocide is an ongoing issue in the jurisprudence of genocide. The question of whether a genocidal policy or plan is an element of the crime of genocide has implications for the rights of the accused, the right to have the law interpreted in their favor where it is ambiguous, and the risk of harm from a theory of culpability that could be satisfied by simple participation in any large-scale killing.

== Legal definition of genocide ==
By the legal definition of genocide, scholars mean the definition from article 2 of the Genocide Convention. The definition itself does not contain any contextual elements, nor does it not state a requirement for state or organizational involvement. The US supported a strict requirement of state complicity but many countries opposed it. Arguments were made about failed states and weak states and their capability to prevent genocide from occurring. Only one expert argued that "genocide should be restricted to the actions of rulers."

The International Criminal Tribunal for the former Yugoslavia (ICTY) interpreted the legal definition of genocide as not requiring collective involvement. According to the decisions of the ICTY, individuals acting on their own could be guilty of genocide. Among scholars of genocide jurisprudence, William Schabas has opposed this interpretation, writing that it is "rather preposterous" based on historic precedent. All recognized cases of genocide have been committed in "pursuit of a plan or policy of a State or state-like entity".

Antonio Cassese does not consider a genocidal policy or campaign to be a legal requirement:

It would be incorrect to conclude that the genocidal policy or campaign is one of the legal ingredients of genocide. Even admitting that historically genocide has been perpetrated within a genocidal context, still it is theoretically possible that a lone perpetrator may realistically aim at the destruction of a targeted group in the absence of such context.

A few months after the Trial Chamber decision in Jelisić convicted for genocide without evidence of a plan or policy, the ICC elements added a contextual element to avoid the inclusion of isolated hate crimes as genocide:

the conduct took place in the context of a manifest pattern of similar conduct directed against that group or was conduct that could itself effect such destruction

Previously, the United States had proposed the "widespread and systematic" language used for crimes against humanity. In early 2000, it was replaced by the "context of a manifest pattern" language.

== Inference of genocidal intent ==
Genocidal acts like murder, forcible transfer of children and forced sterilization are crimes themselves. What makes those crimes genocide is that they are committed with what has been called the "special intent." The accused perpetrator must have the intent. Even if a great many people are killed as part of a genocidal plan, the mental state of the individual must be capable of being proven by the prosecution. The crime of genocide can not be proven by objectively identifiable conduct alone; it requires proof of the state of mind of the accused perpetrator.

Phillippe Larochelle, defense lawyer at the International Criminal Tribunal for Rwanda (ICTR), has questioned the narratives of collective guilt advanced by prosecutors during their investigations and obtaining of witness statements:

You are getting into the realms of holding people accountable by virtue of the fact they belonged to an organisation or collective or group which I think is a mistake, and it actually runs contrary to what the original resolution says which is if you want to find someone guilty, you have to demonstrate their own guilt, intent and acts. You cannot hold someone guilty by the fact that they belong to a government, a political party or an organisation.

Scholars have noted that perpetrators may seek to avoid legal consequences by claiming an absence of intent. If the intent requirement was knowledge based it would be easier to prove intent. All that would be required is an act that knowingly contributes to a genocidal campaign; under a knowledge based intent standard the requirement of a genocidal campaign would be implicit.

== Cases ==
- Akayesu
- Kayishema
- Ruzindana
- Jelisić - "The murders committed by the accused are sufficient to establish the material element of the crime of genocide and it is a priori possible to conceive that the accused harbored the plan to exterminate an entire group without this intent having been supported by any organisation in which other individuals participated" Jelisić IT-95-10-T (n 6) para 109
- Krstić - "The Trial Chamber relied on the definition of genocide in the Elements of Crimes adopted by the ICC. This definition, stated the Trial Chamber, 'indicates clearly that genocide requires that 'the conduct took place in the context of a manifest pattern of similar conduct.' The Trial Chamber's reliance of the definition of genocide given in the ICC's Elements of Crimes is inapposite ... the requirement that the prohibited conduct be part of a widespread of systematic attack does not appear in the Genocide Convention and was not mandated by customary international law. Because the definition adopted by the Elements of Crimes did not reflect customary law as it existed at the time Krstić' committed his crimes, it cannot be used to support the Trial Chamber's conclusion." Krstić' ICTY A. Ch. 19.4.04 para 224
