= Goran Jelisić =

Bosnian Serb convicted war criminal and former police officer (born 1968)

- Горан Јелисић
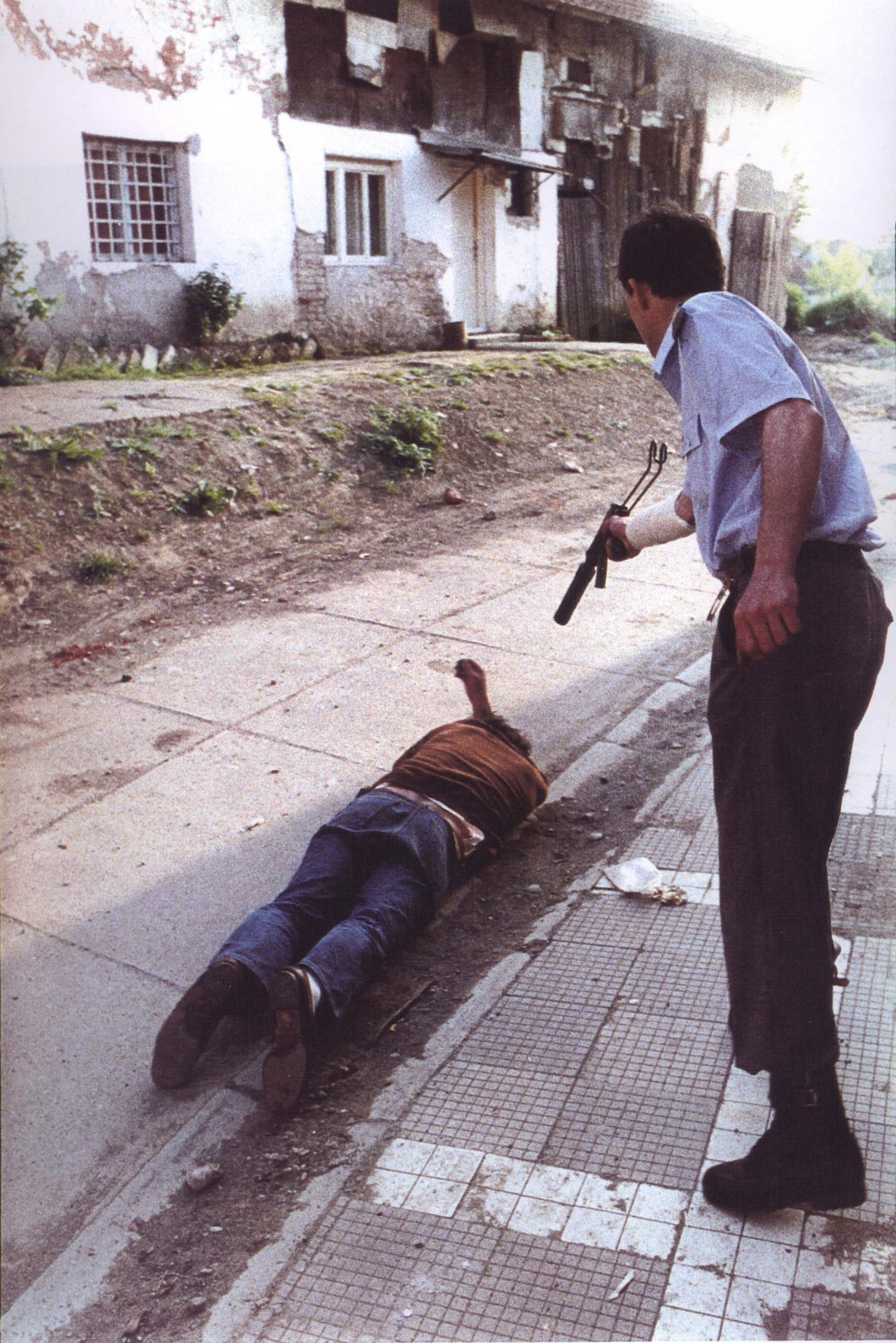
- Jelisić executing a man in Zanatski centar in Brčko, May 1992 (photograph provided courtesy of the ICTY)
- Born: 7 June 1968 (age 58); Bijeljina, SR Bosnia and Herzegovina, Yugoslavia
- Other name: "The Serb Adolf Hitler"
- Citizenship: Bosnia and Herzegovina
- Status: Incarcerated
- Convictions: War crimes (12 counts); Crimes against humanity (15 counts)
- Penalty: 40 years imprisonment

Details
- Victims: 13+
- Span of crimes: 17 April – 20 November 1992
- Country: Bosnia and Herzegovina
- Target: Predominantly Bosniak civilians
- Date apprehended: 22 January 1998

Goran Jelisić (Serbian Cyrillic: Горан Јелисић; born 7 June 1968) is a Bosnian Serb policeman and camp guard who was found guilty of having committed crimes against humanity and violating the customs of war by the International Criminal Tribunal for the Former Yugoslavia (ICTY) at the Luka camp in Brčko during the Bosnian War.

Jelisić called himself the "Serb Adolf Hitler" and admitted that his "motivation and goal was to kill Muslims". In 1999, Jelisić pled guilty to sixteen counts of violating the customs of war and fifteen counts of crimes against humanity and was sentenced to 40 years in prison. He was acquitted of the charge of genocide as the court found that it had not been established beyond a reasonable doubt.

== Biography ==
Jelisić was born on 7 June 1968 in Bijeljina, SR Bosnia and Herzegovina, SFR Yugoslavia. At the time, Bijeljina was 40% Bosniak. Born to a working family, he was raised primarily by his grandmother, and he had a variety of Serb and Bosniak friends. Prior to the war, Jelisić worked as a farmhand, and enjoyed fishing. During his trial, members of his fishing groups defended him as character witnesses. After committing cheque fraud, he was imprisoned for some time.

=== Bosnian War ===
He was released in February 1992 with the opportunity to volunteer for Republika Srpska's war effort. In May, Goran Jelisić arrived in Brčko.

During the war, Jelisić commanded the Luka camp, which was one of the most notorious concentration camps during the Bosnian War. It was located on the most important arterial road near Brčko in north Bosnia, which connected the two parts of Republika Srpska. Jelisić later confessed his crimes during his trial as a war criminal at the Hague Tribunal. During one of his acts of murder, he was photographed by Bojan Stojanović, whose photo won the World Press Photo of the Year award in 1993. Jelisić's accomplice and girlfriend at the time, Monika Karan-Ilić (née Simeunović), was also found guilty of participating in torture, inhumane treatment and infliction of suffering on Bosniak and Croat civilians at Luka camp and Brčko police station in May and June 1992. A final verdict reduced her sentence to two-and-a-half years of prison in 2013. She died on 21 August 2021 in a car accident.

Jelisić styled himself, and has been referred to in the media as the "Serb Adolf Hitler" and admitted that his "motivation and goal was to kill Muslims".

=== Trial ===
On 22 January 1998, Jelisić was apprehended in Serb-dominated Bijeljina by the American Task Force Razorback—a joint CIA–DOD unit attached to Operation Amber Star. This was the culmination of a months-long intelligence operation (codenamed Operation Amber Light) led by Lt Col Rick Francona. The Navy SEAL team which executed the arrest was led by Ryan Zinke, who would later be elected to the U.S. House of Representatives. Jelisić's apartment was surrounded by U.S. forces, and he was taken without incident. This capture was the first performed by U.S. forces against a Bosnian war criminal (though U.S. forces had served as backup for Dutch and British forces in the previous year). After his capture, Jelisić was transferred to a U.S. base at Tuzla, taken into custody by an FBI Special Agent and flown to The Hague.

U.S. forces reported that the operation was planned in advance. The operation occurred during a week in which human rights groups were pressuring the Clinton administration to use U.S. troops to help detain some of the dozens of war criminals still at large.

Jelisić faced trial for one count of genocide, sixteen counts of violating the customs of war and fifteen counts of crimes against humanity in relation to his involvement in the inhumane treatment and systematic killing of detainees at the Luka camp, where he was alleged to have, every day, "entered Luka's main hangar, where most detainees were kept, selected detainees for interrogation, beat them and then often shot and killed them". In one specific instance, it was alleged that Jelisić beat an elderly Bosniak man to death with a metal pipe, a shovel, and a wooden stick.

During Jelisić's trial, many witnesses came forward, describing other acts by him during the war. An old Bosniak friend of Jelisić noted that Jelisić gave his wife money while he was in captivity to help her flee abroad. Another friend described how he helped the friend's sister and her husband escape in a similar way. Others submitted similar testimony regarding Jelisić's acts to safeguard and help Bosniak and non-Bosniak friends before and during the war. In his hometown of Bijeljina, Jelisić paid hospital costs for Bosniaks.

In 1999, Jelisić pleaded guilty to the charges of crimes against humanity and violating the customs of war, but not to the charge of genocide. He was acquitted on the charge of genocide as the court did not believe the prosecution had proved this beyond reasonable doubt. He was sentenced to 40 years' imprisonment. The same sentence was confirmed by the appeals chamber. The sentence was at that time the most severe given by the Hague, superseding the 20-year ruling against Duško Tadić. The court also suggested Jelisić receive psychiatric treatment. In 2001, the prosecution requested a retrial on Jelisić's dismissed charge of genocide, but an appeals court upheld his 40-year sentence. On 29 May 2003, Jelisić was transferred to Italy to serve the remainder of his sentence with credit for time served since his 1998 arrest.

Jelisić's trial is considered important for setting a high standard of evidence for charges of genocide. Olaf Jenssen, of the University of Leicester, argued that the court set an unreasonably high standard of evidence for proving genocidal intent – so high, that even some of the perpetrators of the Holocaust would be found not guilty of genocide by court's standards. He was also significant for being one of only three people to admit to their crimes before the Hague tribunal (as of 2004).

Jelisić later attended the war crimes trial of Esad Landžo, a Bosniak who committed war crimes against Serbs at the Čelebići camp. As a character witness, he provided a passionate defense of the Bosniak, noting how Landžo had aided other prisoners at The Hague.

In 2017, Jelisić was denied early release. A second appeal for early release filed in 2021 after he had served two-thirds of his sentence was also rejected. His third and last appeal for early release in August 2025 was also denied.

== Family ==
He is the second child of accountant Aleksandar Jelisić and Ivanka Jelisić. In September 1995, he married Ana Jelisić, and in October, she gave birth to a boy, whom Goran named Aleksandar after his father. Ivanka Jelisić passed away on 4 June 2004.

== Memorial ==
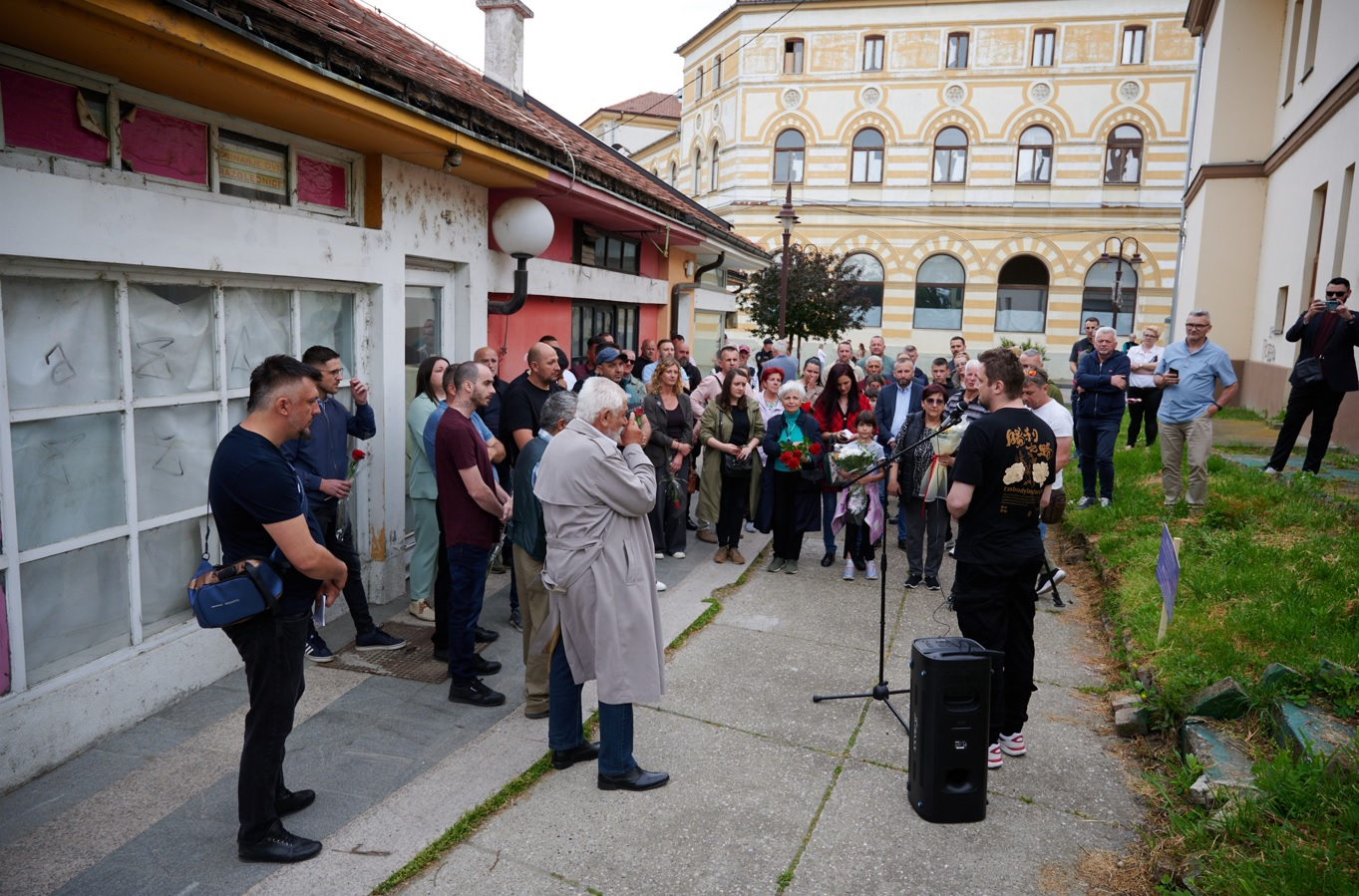
Commemoration in the Zanatski Center in Brčko, organized by UDIK on May 7, 2026

Since 2023, the non-governmental agency UDIK has demanded that Brčko District authorities place a memorial plaque in the Zanatski Center in Brčko commemorating Jelisić's execution of two Bosniaks at the site, Hajrudin Muzurović and Husein Kršo, on 7 May 1992. According to the organization, photographs of the victims would testify to the war crimes and ethnic cleansing of Brčko.

On 7 May 2024, UDIK with the members of the Muzurović and Kršo families laid flowers at the place of the murder. It was the first commemoration held in street of Zanatski Center in Brčko which Goran Jelisić used as an execution ground. The following years, UDIK have been publishing an obituary in daily Oslobođenje dedicated to victims with the message that the crime scene was not marked.
