= University Sinergija =

University in Bijeljina, Bosnia and Herzegovina

- Type: Private
- Established: 2005; 21 years ago
- Students: 504 (2018–19)
- Location: Bijeljina, Republika Srpska, Bosnia and Herzegovina; 44°46′07″N 19°12′21″E
- Campus: Suburban
- Colors: Red
- Website: www.sinergija.edu.ba

University Sinergija is a private university located in Bijeljina, Republika Srpska, Bosnia and Herzegovina.
