= 2003–04 First League of the Republika Srpska =

The First League of the Republika Srpska 2003-04 was the 9th since its establishment.

== Teams ==
- BSK Crni Đorđe Banja Luka
- Drina Zvornik
- Drina HE Višegrad
- Jedinstvo Brčko
- Kozara Gradiška
- Ledinci Bijeljina
- Ljubić Prnjavor
- Mladost Gacko
- Napredak Donji Šepak
- Nikos Kanbera Rudanka
- Omladinac Mobi'S Banja Luka
- Radnik Bijeljina
- Rudar Prijedor
- Slavija Sarajevo
- Sloboda Novi Grad
- Sloga Doboj

== League table ==
Pos	Team	Pld	W	D	L	GF	GA	GD	Pts	Promotion or relegation
1	Slavija Sarajevo (C, P)	30	18	7	5	53	19	+34	61	Promotion to Premijer Liga BiH
2	Mladost Gacko	30	16	3	11	53	31	+22	51	
3	Ljubić Prnjavor	30	13	6	11	53	46	+7	45	
4	Radnik Bijeljina	30	13	5	12	35	35	0	44	
5	Napredak Donji Šepak	30	13	5	12	35	40	−5	44	
6	Sloga Doboj	30	13	4	13	33	35	−2	43	
7	Jedinstvo Brčko	30	13	2	15	29	37	−8	41	
8	Drina Zvornik	30	11	8	11	40	42	−2	41	
9	Rudar Prijedor	30	13	2	15	44	47	−3	41	
10	Kozara Gradiška	30	12	5	13	26	31	−5	41	
11	Drina Višegrad	30	13	2	15	33	39	−6	41	
12	Sloboda Novi Grad	30	11	7	12	31	36	−5	40	
13	BSK Crni Đorđe	30	11	7	12	30	28	+2	40	
14	Omladinac Mobi'S (R)	30	11	7	12	32	33	−1	40	Relegation to Second League RS
15	Nikos Kanbera (R)	30	11	3	16	39	51	−12	36	Relegation to Second League RS
16	Ledinci (R)	30	9	5	16	34	50	−16	32	Relegation to Second League RS

Source: SportDC
Rules for classification: 1) points; 2) goal difference; 3) number of goals scored.
(C) Champions; (P) Promoted; (R) Relegated
