= University of Bijeljina =

Bijeljina University
- Универзитет „Бијељина” Univerzitet „Bijeljina”
- Type: Private
- Established: 2011; 15 years ago
- Rector: Slađana Vujičić
- Location: Bijeljina, Republika Srpska, Bosnia and Herzegovina; 44.785362°N 19.271428°E
- Website: www.ubn.rs.ba

Bijeljina University (Serbian: Универзитет „Бијељина”, Univerzitet „Bijeljina”) is a private university in Bijeljina, Republika Srpska, Bosnia and Herzegovina. It was founded in 2011 by the College of Health Care Bijeljina (Visoka škola „Koledž zdravstvene njege”), with the consent of the Ministry of Education and Culture of Republika Srpska. It began operating in 2012. Its founder is Ljiljana Tomić, who also serves as Vice-Rector for Teaching and Student Affairs.

== Accreditation ==
The university was accredited by decision no. 01/1.3.114-6/21 of the Higher Education Agency of Republika Srpska of 28 July 2021, and was entered in the state register of accredited higher education institutions of the Agency for Development of Higher Education and Quality Assurance of Bosnia and Herzegovina by decision no. 05-33-251-1/20 of 5 August 2021.

== The university today ==
The university has amphitheatres, classrooms and laboratories for practical classes and tutorial exercises. Students also have access to computer rooms, a library with a reading room, a meeting room and spaces for consultations. The amphitheatres have their own sound systems, and all classrooms have Internet access and are equipped for teaching with video projection. The university also houses the Centre for Psychological Counselling of Young People.

The university currently consists of five faculties:

- Faculty of Pharmacy
- Faculty of Psychology
- Faculty of Health Studies
- Faculty of Agriculture
- Faculty of Technical Sciences (study programmes undergoing accreditation)

=== Management ===
The office of rector was previously held by Prof. Dr. Milena Jelikić Stankov and Prof. Dr. Gorica Cvijanović.

Name	Position
Prof. Dr. Slađana Vujičić	Rector
Prof. Dr. Ljiljana Tomić	Vice-Rector for Teaching and Student Affairs
Prof. Dr. Jasmina Šljivić	Vice-Rector for Research and International Cooperation
Prof. Dr. Sunčica Stanković	Vice-Rector for Quality and Human Resources
Nenad Radmanović	Secretary General
Prof. Dr. Mersida Jandrić	Dean, Faculty of Agriculture
Prof. Dr. Zoran Milosavljević	Dean, Faculty of Pharmacy
Prof. Dr. Biljana Dimitrić	Dean, Faculty of Psychology
Prof. Dr. Dragan Zečević	Dean, Faculty of Health Studies

== Faculty of Pharmacy ==
=== Integrated academic studies of pharmacy ===
The integrated academic studies of pharmacy last five years (ten semesters) and are worth 300 ECTS credits. During this period, students complete a total of 1,500 hours of theoretical classes, 885 hours of practical classes, 945 hours of seminars and 5,445 hours of independent work (student practice), amounting to 9,000 hours at the faculty and in health care institutions.

Academic title awarded: Master of Pharmacy – 300 ECTS.

Model:	Integrated academic studies of pharmacy – five-year studies – 300 ECTS
Area of education:	Health and health protection
Field of education:	Health
Discipline:	Pharmacy

== Faculty of Psychology ==
=== Undergraduate academic studies of psychology ===
The studies last four years (eight semesters) and are worth 240 ECTS credits. During this period, students complete a total of 7,200 hours of active teaching and independent work.

Academic title awarded: Graduate Psychologist – 240 ECTS.

Model:	First cycle of undergraduate academic studies of psychology – four-year studies – 240 ECTS
Area of education:	Social sciences, business, administration and law
Field of education:	Social sciences
Discipline:	Psychology

== Faculty of Health Studies ==
=== Academic studies of nursing ===
The studies last three years (six semesters) and are worth 180 ECTS credits. During this period, students complete a total of 1,200 hours of theoretical classes, 810 hours of practical classes, 240 hours of seminars and 2,170 hours of independent work (student practice), amounting to 4,420 hours at the faculty and in health care institutions.

Academic title awarded: Graduate Nurse – 180 ECTS.

Model:	First cycle of academic studies of nursing – 180 ECTS
Area of education:	Medical and health sciences
Field of education:	Health sciences
Discipline:	Nursing

== Faculty of Agriculture ==
=== Undergraduate academic studies of agricultural economics ===
The first-cycle studies of agricultural economics last four years (eight semesters) and are worth 240 ECTS credits. During this period, students complete 7,200 hours of active teaching and independent work.

Academic title awarded: Graduate Engineer of Agricultural Economics – 240 ECTS.

Model:	First cycle of academic studies of agricultural economics – 240 ECTS
Area of education:	Agriculture, fisheries, forestry and veterinary medicine
Field of education:	Agriculture and fisheries
Discipline:	Agricultural economics and rural development

=== Undergraduate academic studies of agricultural production ===
The first-cycle studies of agricultural production last four years (eight semesters) and are worth 240 ECTS credits. During this period, students complete 7,200 hours of active teaching and independent work.

Academic title awarded: Graduate Engineer of Agriculture – 240 ECTS.

Model:	First cycle of academic studies of agricultural production – 240 ECTS
Area of education:	Agriculture, fisheries, forestry and veterinary medicine
Field of education:	Agriculture and fisheries
Discipline:	Plant production

== Faculty of Technical Sciences ==
The Faculty of Technical Sciences is the university's newest organisational unit.

=== Undergraduate academic studies of logistics engineering ===
The first-cycle undergraduate academic study programme in logistics engineering is in the process of being established and accredited. Second- and third-cycle studies are also planned.

== Publishing ==
The Publishing Centre issues the journal Akademski pregled (Academic Review), proceedings of scientific conferences, the University Bulletin and the Informator.

The journal Akademski pregled is published twice a year.

The International Standard Serial Number (ISSN) was assigned by the National and University Library of Bosnia and Herzegovina in Sarajevo:

- ISSN 2637-2525 – print edition
- ISSN 2637-2029 – electronic edition

== Scientific conferences ==
The university organises the following scientific conferences:

- International Scientific Conference "Village and Agriculture" (Selo i poljoprivreda)
- Scientific and Professional Conference with International Participation "Innovations in Psychology" (Inovacije u psihologiji)
- International Scientific and Expert Conference "Current News in Pharmacy and Biomedicine" (Aktuelnosti u farmaciji i biomedicini)
- Scientific and Professional Congress "Health for All – A Look into the Future" (Zdravlje za sve – pogled u budućnost)

== International cooperation ==
The university holds the Erasmus Charter for Higher Education and participates in Erasmus+ projects. Active projects are HAWKING, TRUST and RES-UNI, and completed projects are VIRAL and GROWTH.

Bijeljina University was the coordinator of the Erasmus+ project GROWTH (Greening Relevance in Operations in Western-Balkans Tertiary-Education Habitats), implemented from 1 March 2023 to 28 February 2026.

== Centres ==
The Centre for Psychological Counselling of Young People is divided into three sectors:

- Counselling sector
- Research sector
- Educational sector

In addition to the Centre for Psychological Counselling of Young People, the university also includes:

- Publishing Centre
- Centre for Continuing Education, Career Monitoring and Cooperation with Industry

== See also ==
- List of universities in Bosnia and Herzegovina
