= Bosanska Rača–Ugljevik railway =

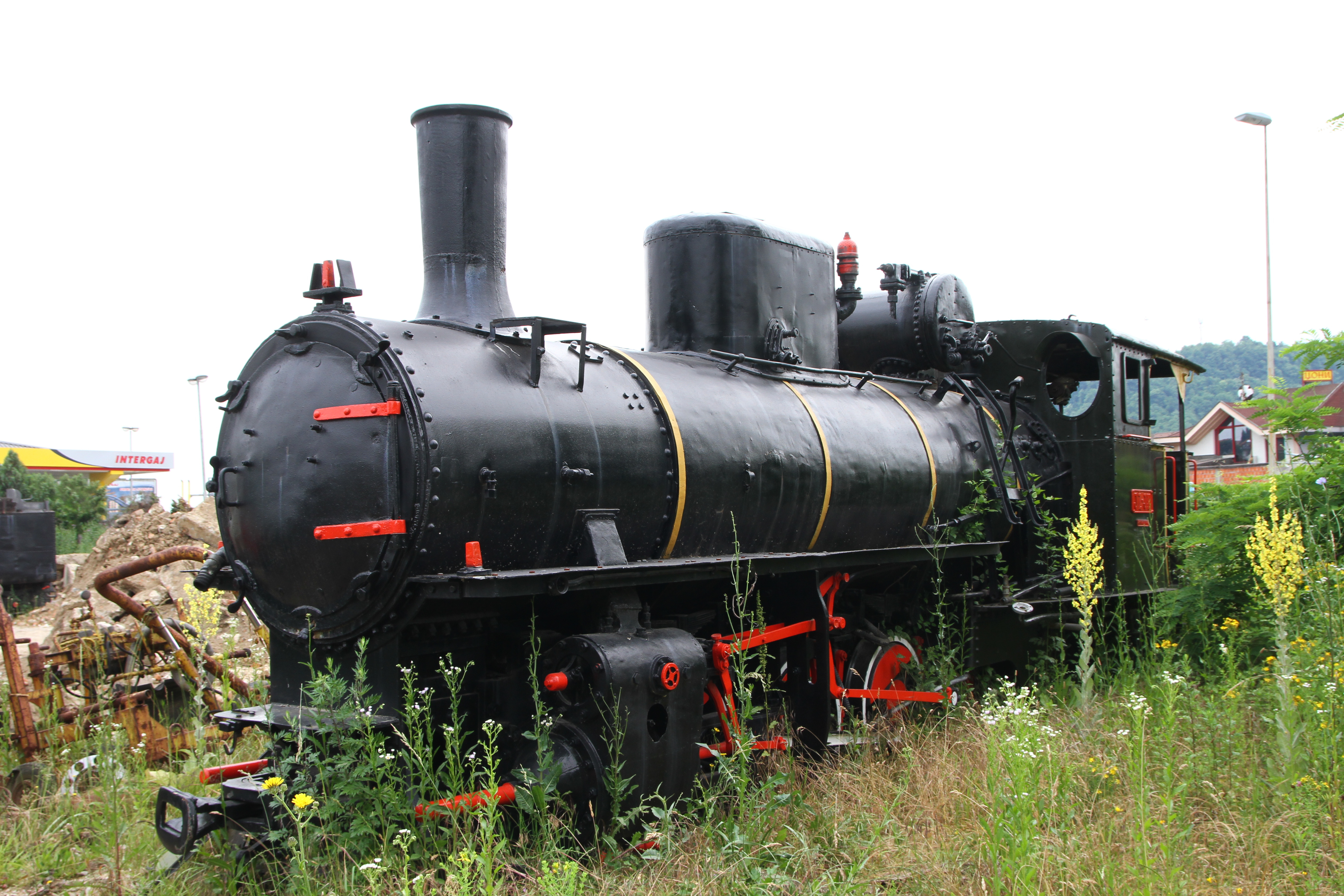
- JŽ 83-175 locomotive in Ugljevik, 2016 (before restoration)

Overview
- Status: Ceased operation
- Locale: Bijeljina, Bosnia and Herzegovina
- Termini: Bosanska Rača; Ugljevik (later Bosanska Mezgraja)

Service
- Type: Industrial railway; Freight railway; Regional rail
- System: Yugoslav Railways

History
- Closed: 26 May 1979

Technical
- Track gauge: 760 mm (2 ft 5 15/16 in) Bosnian gauge
- Old gauge: 600 mm (1 ft 11 5/8 in)

Bosanska Rača–Ugljevik railway (also referred to as BIjeljina–Bosanska Mezgraja after 1967) was an isolated 44 km long narrow-gauge railway in Bosnia and Herzegovina between the towns of Bosanska Rača and Ugljevik via Bijeljina. It was built primarily to transport coal from the Ugljevik (and later Mezgraja) coal mines, but was also used for passenger transport. The railway was built in 1916-1918 by Austria-Hungary, and was partially closed in 1950 and totally closed in 1979. At the time of the closure, it was the last remaining narrow gauge railway in Europe with scheduled passenger service.

== History ==
This railway line was first built in 1916-1918 while Bosnia and Herzegovina was still ruled by Austria-Hungary. It was built as a 600 mm gauge line to transport brown coal from the Ugljevik mine to the Sava river. In 1919, now in Yugoslavia, the passenger service was started, and starting in 1921, the line was gradually upgraded to the narrow 760 mm gauge. In 1939, a 11 km branch line was built to Bosanska Mezgraja to serve expanded coal mine.

The railway was damaged in the World War II. After being attacked by Yugoslav Partisans several times, it was heavily damaged near the end of the War by the retreating Germans. The sector between Modran and Bosanska Mezgraja was totally destroyed. It was rebuilt after the war and officially reopened in May 1947.

In 1950, the sector between Bosanska Rača and Bijeljina was dismantled after new standard-gauge railway Šid—Bijeljina was built. After that, the coal had to be reloaded in Bijeljina between the narrow and standard gauge freight wagons. In 1967, the Ugljevik branch was closed, so that only the 33 km line between Bijeljina and Bosanska Mezgraja remained operational. The trains were mixed trains: few coal wagons and two or three passenger carriages.

The coal mine was closed in 1978, so the railway became unprofitable. It was finally closed for traffic in 1979. At the time, it was the last remaining narrow gauge railway in Europe with scheduled passenger service. In the 1980s, the then-town of Ugljevik was abandoned and became known as Stari Ugljevik (Old Ugljevik), while the new town called Ugljevik was built close to Modran.

== Rolling stock ==
When the 600mm railway was partially opened to traffic in 1917 (Bosanska Rača–Bijeljina), it was operated by three small 0-4-0T type locomotives. When the railway was extended to Ugljevik in 1918, five 0-6-0T type locomotives were employed (of the HRB R IIIc series).

In the last period, the railway was operated by five JŽ 83 steam locomotives pulling both coal and passenger cars.

== Today ==
The railway between Bijeljina and Bosanska Mezgraja was dismantled after 1979. The traffic on the Šid—Bijeljina line was discontinued in 2005, after which Bijeljina was left with no rail traffic at all. The Bijeljina Stara (Old Bijeljina) train station was demolished in 2019 after being neglected for more than a decade. Also in 2019, one of the locomotives that once operated on the Bosanska Rača–Ugljevik railway (JŽ 83-175) was restored and placed in front of the House of Culture in Ugljevik as a memorial.

== Accidents and incidents ==
Two rail workers were killed and three more injured on 30 October 1926 when a freight train derailed and fell from the embankment between the Ugljevik and Modran stations.

In 1975, the traffic was temporarily suspended for a month after flooding damaged railway bridge over the Janja river near Ugljevik.

== See also ==
- Narrow-gauge railways in Bosnia and Herzegovina
