= Slobomir University =

Private University in Slobomir

Slobomir P University
- Slobomir P Univerzitet; Слобомир П Универзитет
- Type: Private
- Established: 3 November 2003; 21 years ago
- Rector: Vladica Ristić
- Students: 379 (2018–19)
- Location: Slobomir, Bosnia and Herzegovina
- Campus: Urban
- Colors: Blue and Old Gold
- Website: www.spu.ba

Slobomir P University (SPU) is a private university located in Slobomir, near the city of Bijeljina, in the Republika Srpska part of Bosnia and Herzegovina. It was founded by Slobodan Pavlović, founder of Slobomir.

== List of faculties ==
Slobomir P University consists of six faculties:

- Academy of Arts
- Faculty of Information Technology
- Faculty of Economics and Management
- Tax Academy
- Law Faculty
- Faculty of Philology

== Degrees offered ==
- Bachelor's degree
- Master's degree
- Doctorate

== See also ==
- Slobomir
