= Duško Kondor =

Bosnian Serb human rights activist

- Born: 10 June 1947; Bijeljina, PR Bosnia and Herzegovina, FPR Yugoslavia
- Died: 22 February 2007 (aged 59); Bijeljina, Bosnia and Herzegovina
- Occupation(s): Human rights activist, professor

Duško Kondor (Serbian Cyrillic: Душко Кондор; 10 June 1947 – 22 February 2007) was a Bosnian human rights activist, a co-founder of the Helsinki Committee for Human Rights in Bosnia and Herzegovina (leading its Human Rights Education department), and a professor of sociology and philosophy.

== Assassination ==
Kondor and his daughter were attacked on 22 February 2007 by local gangsters with machine guns. He was killed and she was severely injured. Kondor had been a witness to the killings of 23 Bosniaks in Bijeljina and was cooperating with the State Investigation and Protection Agency. Christian Schwarz-Schilling, the High Representative for Bosnia and Herzegovina at the time, condemned the killing and expressed his condolences to the family.

Jasmin Baraković, a Bosniak from Bijeljina, was arrested for the attack and sentenced to 20 years' imprisonment. Baraković had previously stalked Kondor's daughter for two years. Kondor had informed the police twice that he had received threats from Baraković and sought protection, but they did not take the threats seriously and failed to take action.

The Duško Kondor Civil Courage Award was created to commemorate him and is awarded annually.
