= Semberija Folk Fest =

Annual folklore festival in Bijeljina, Bosnia and Herzegovina

Semberija Folk Fest is an annual festival of folklore creativity held in Bijeljina, Republika Srpska, Bosnia and Herzegovina. The founder and organizer of the Festival is the Cultural Club Semberija Bijeljina.

The aim of the Festival is to cherish and promote the folklore tradition of the people from all over the world to the citizens and guests of Bijeljina, to inform the guest ensembles about the local culture and tradition of the host town and its surroundings, as well as to establish cooperation and friendly relationships among the ensembles from all over the world.
