= Bijeljina =

City and municipality in Bosnia and Herzegovina

Bijeljina Бијељина (Serbian)
- City
- Grad Bijeljina; Град Бијељина; City of Bijeljina
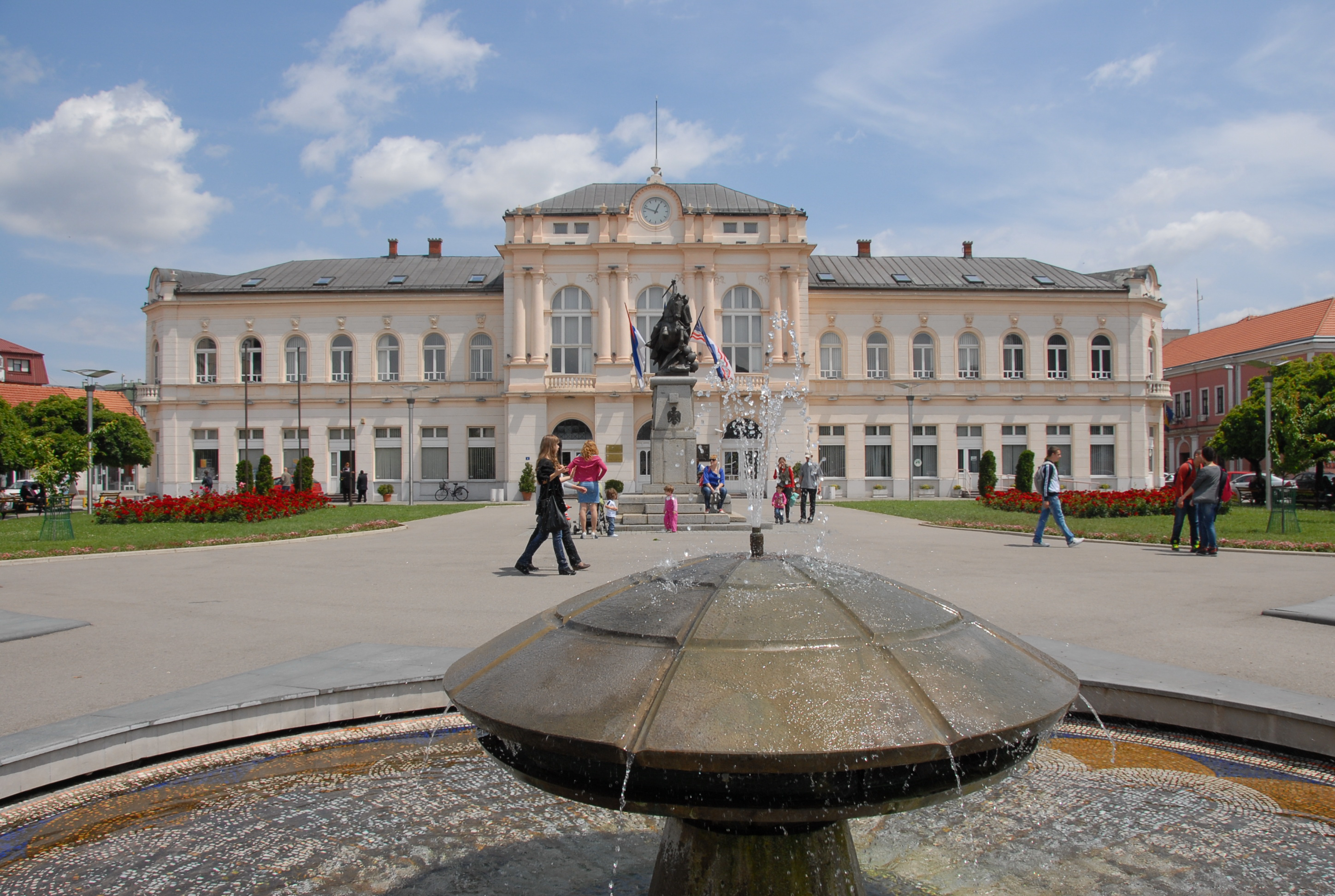
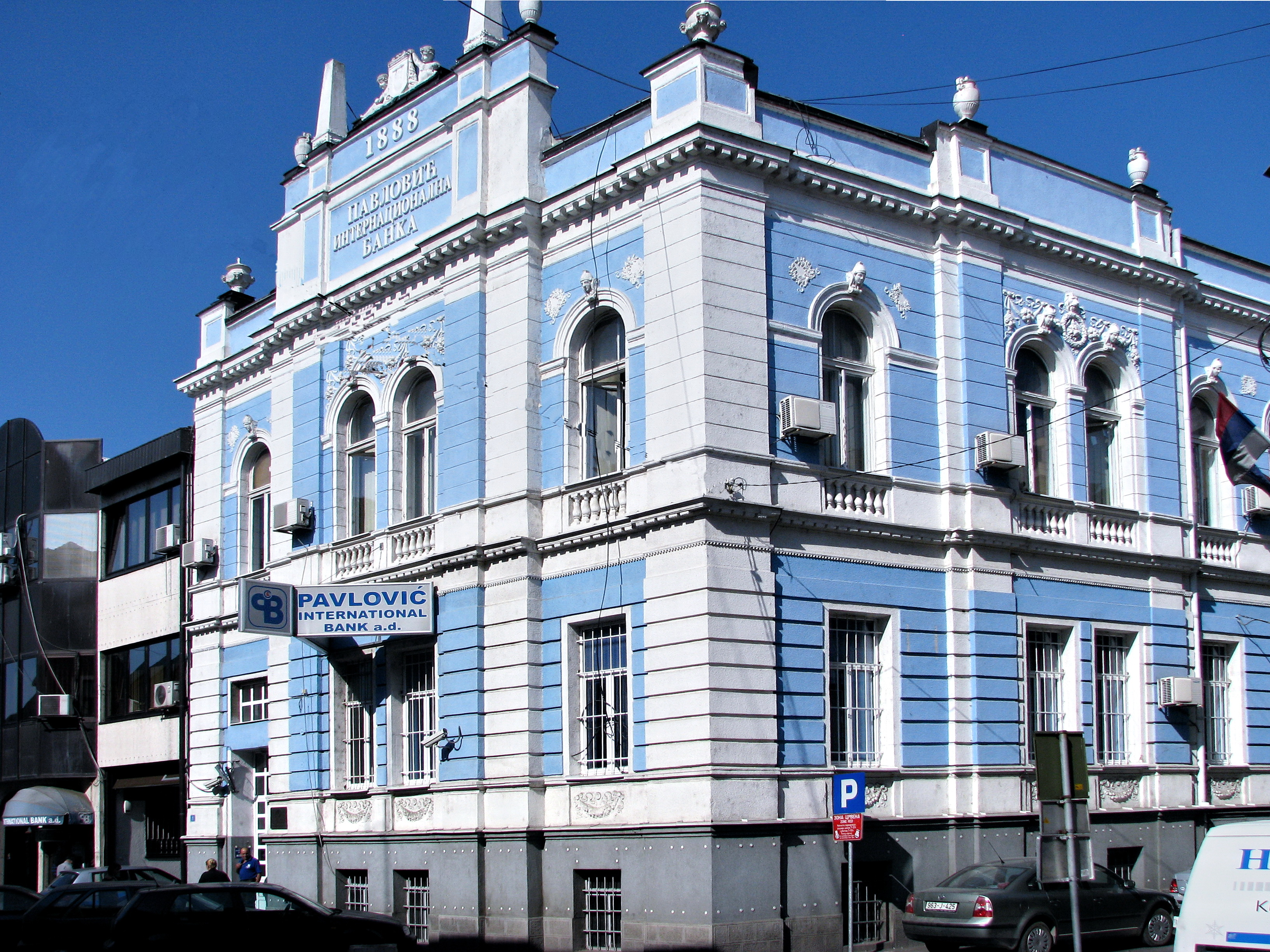
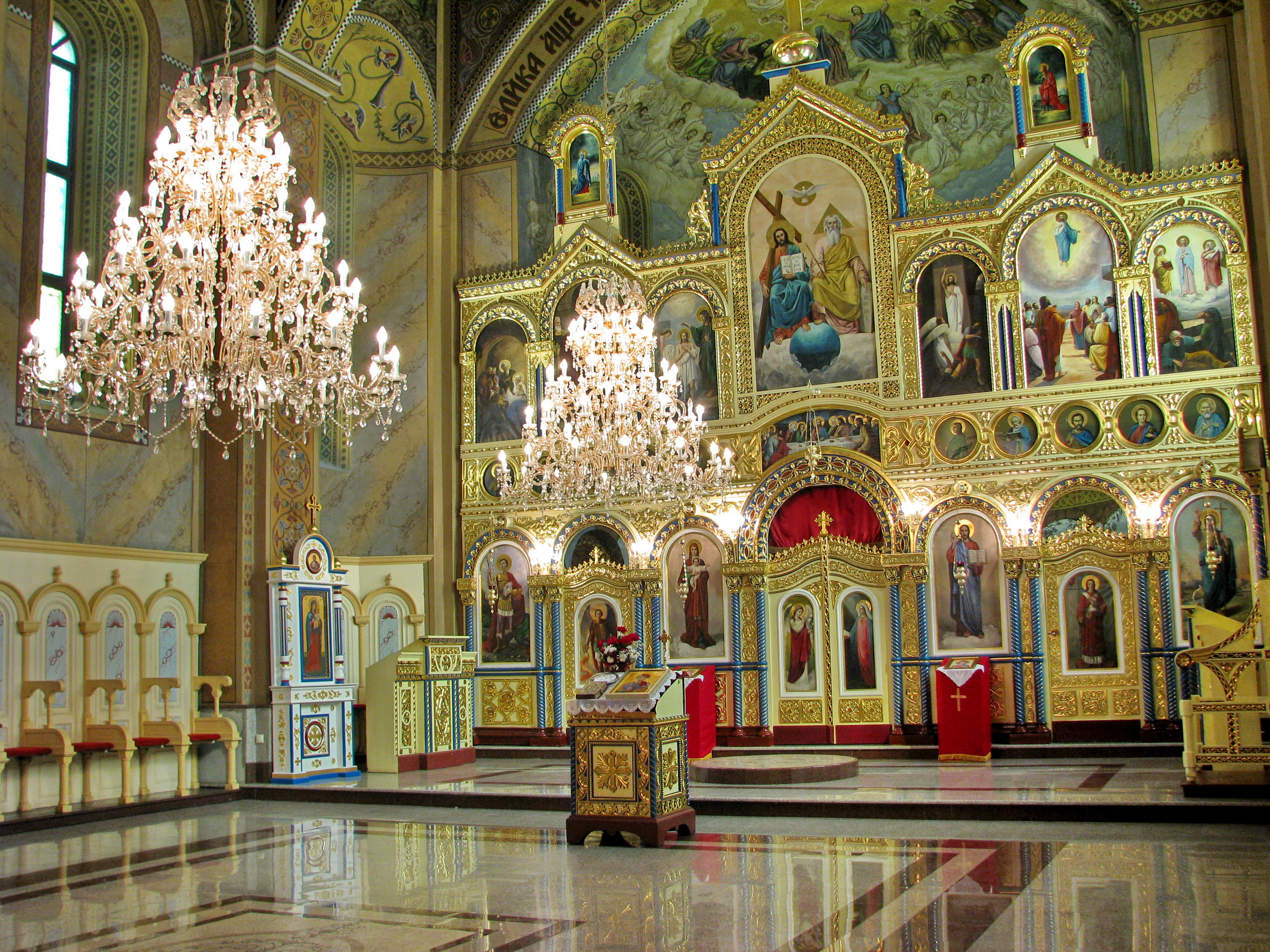
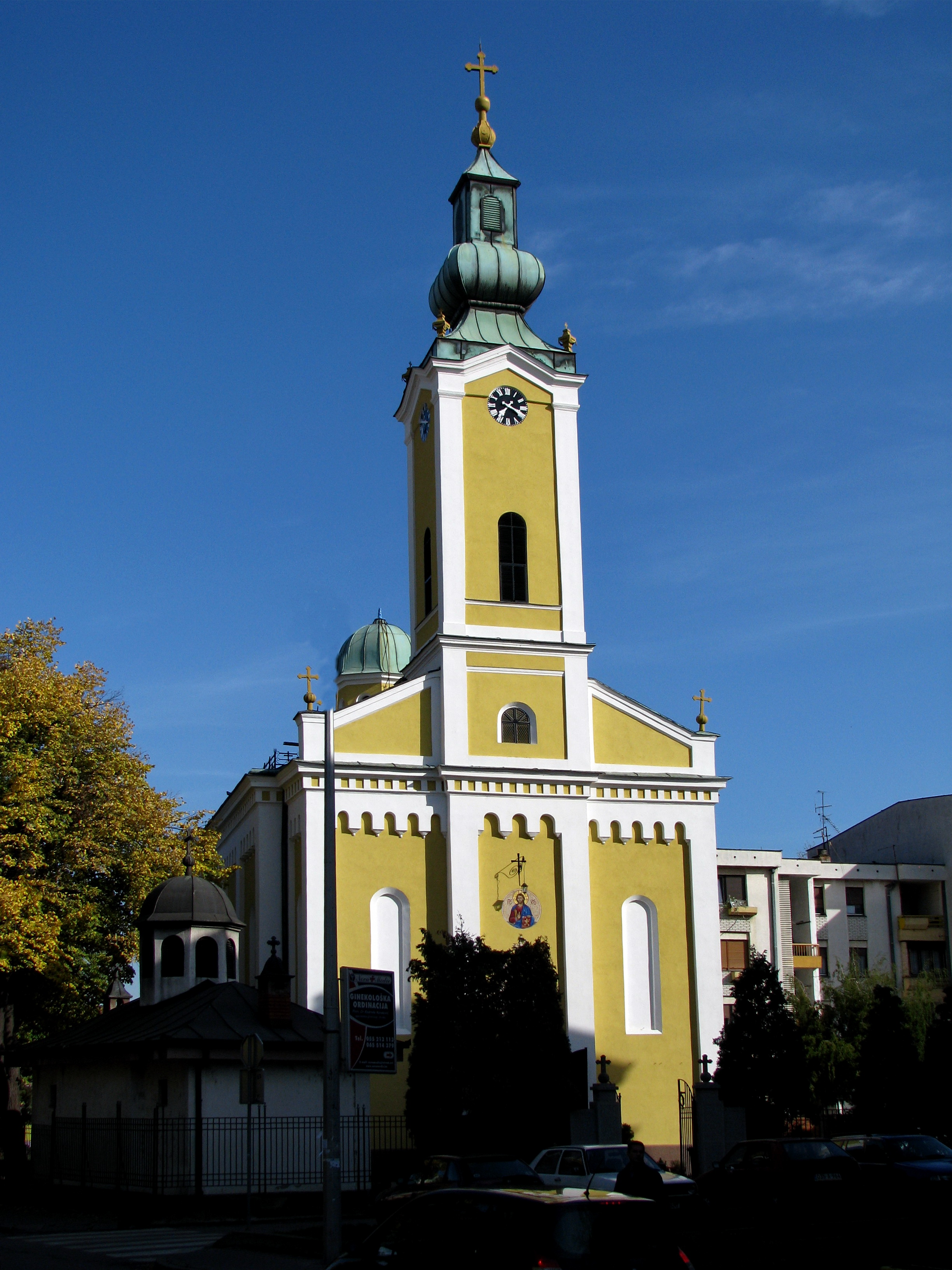
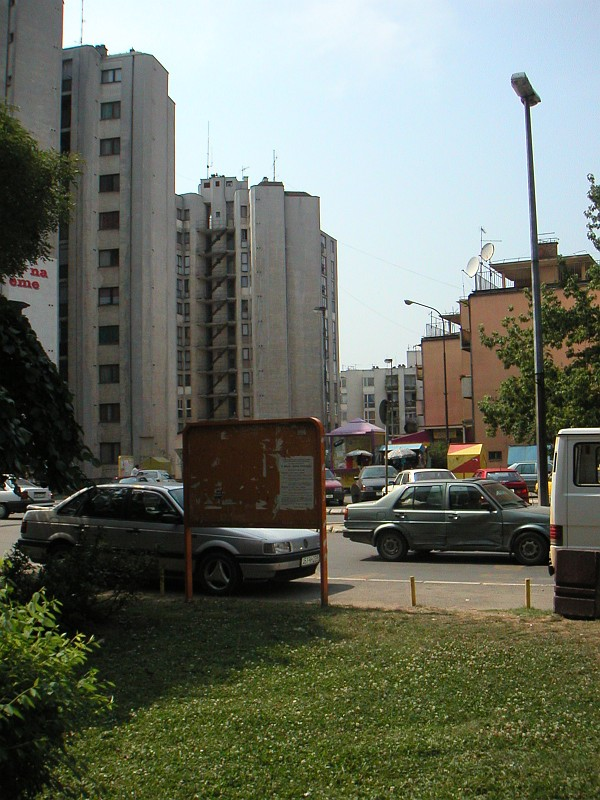
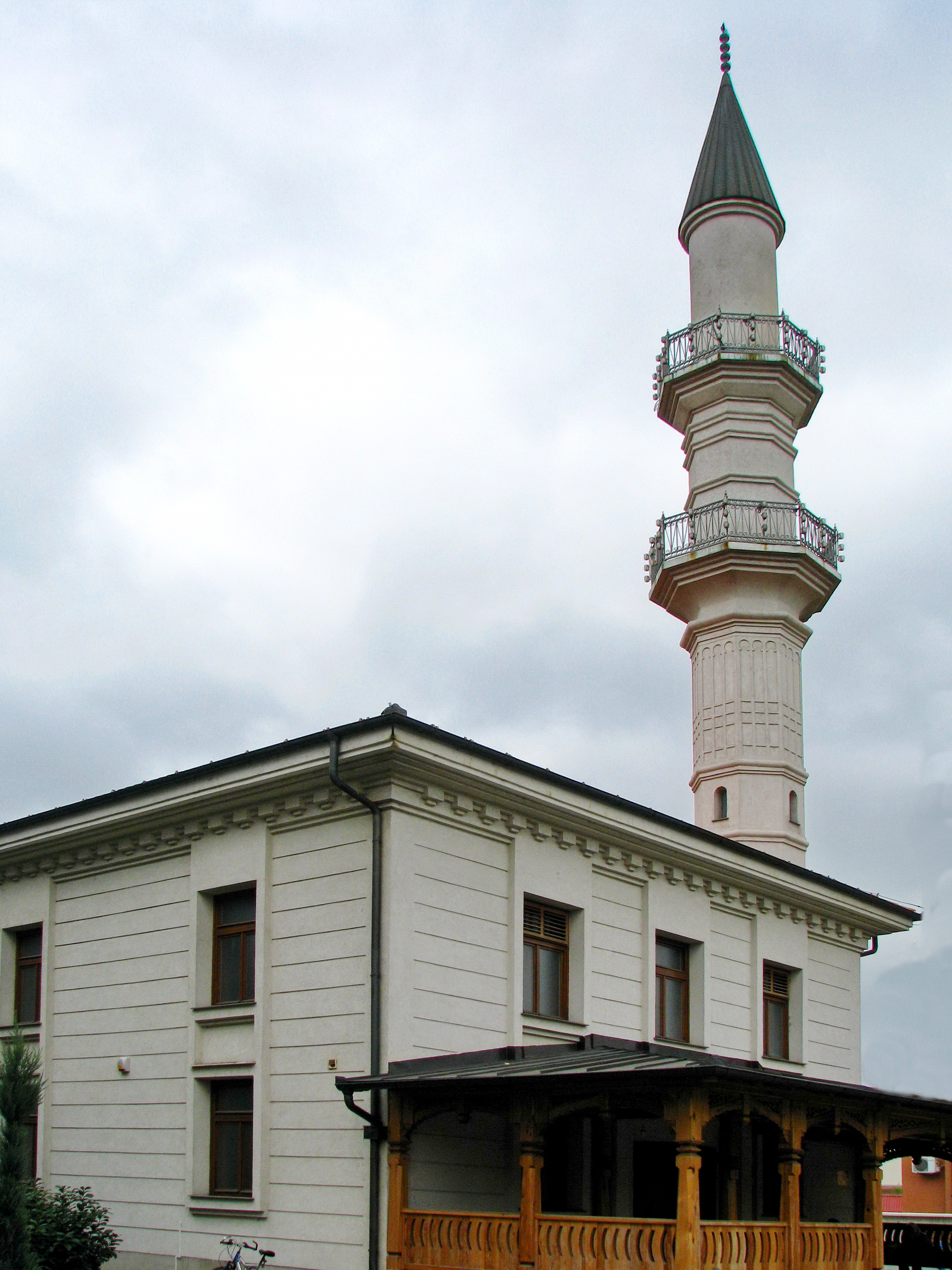
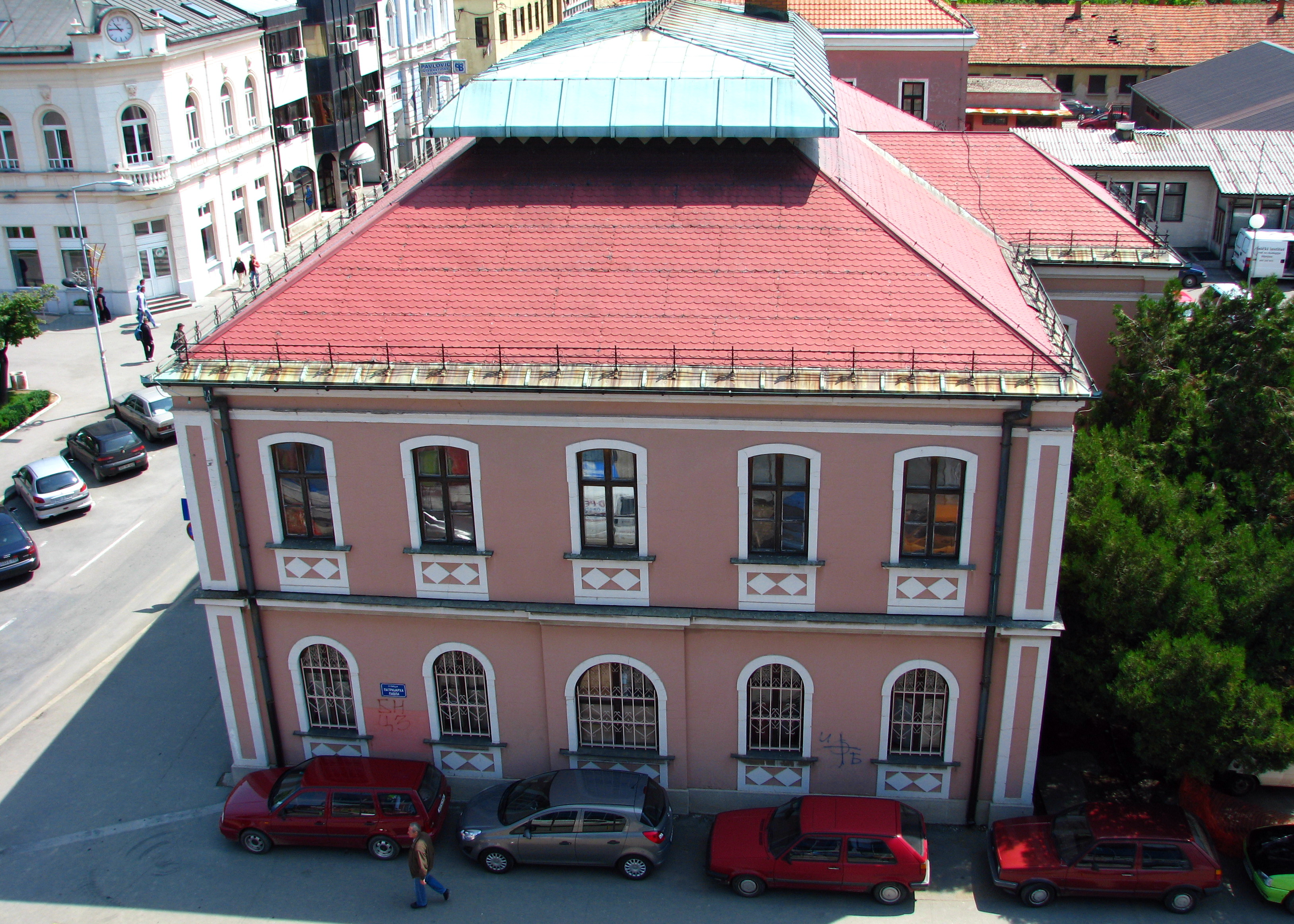
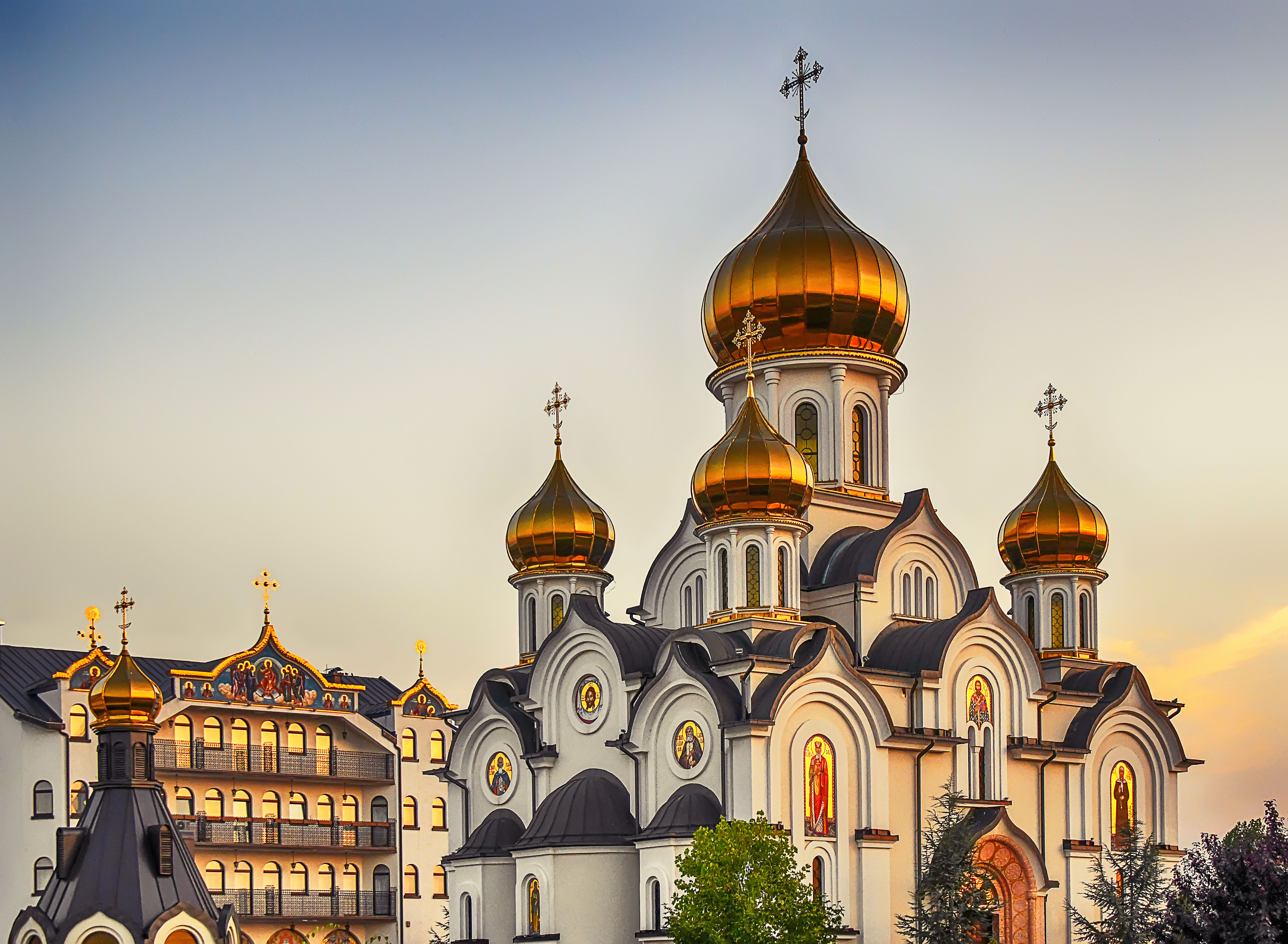
- From top, left to right: The assembly building of Bijeljina, Pavlović bank, the inside of the Church of the Holy Great Martyr George, the outside of the Church of the Holy Great Martyr George, Residential buildings, the Atik mosque, Semberija Museum and the Five Lakes Monastery.

- Flag

- Location of Bijeljina within Republika Srpska

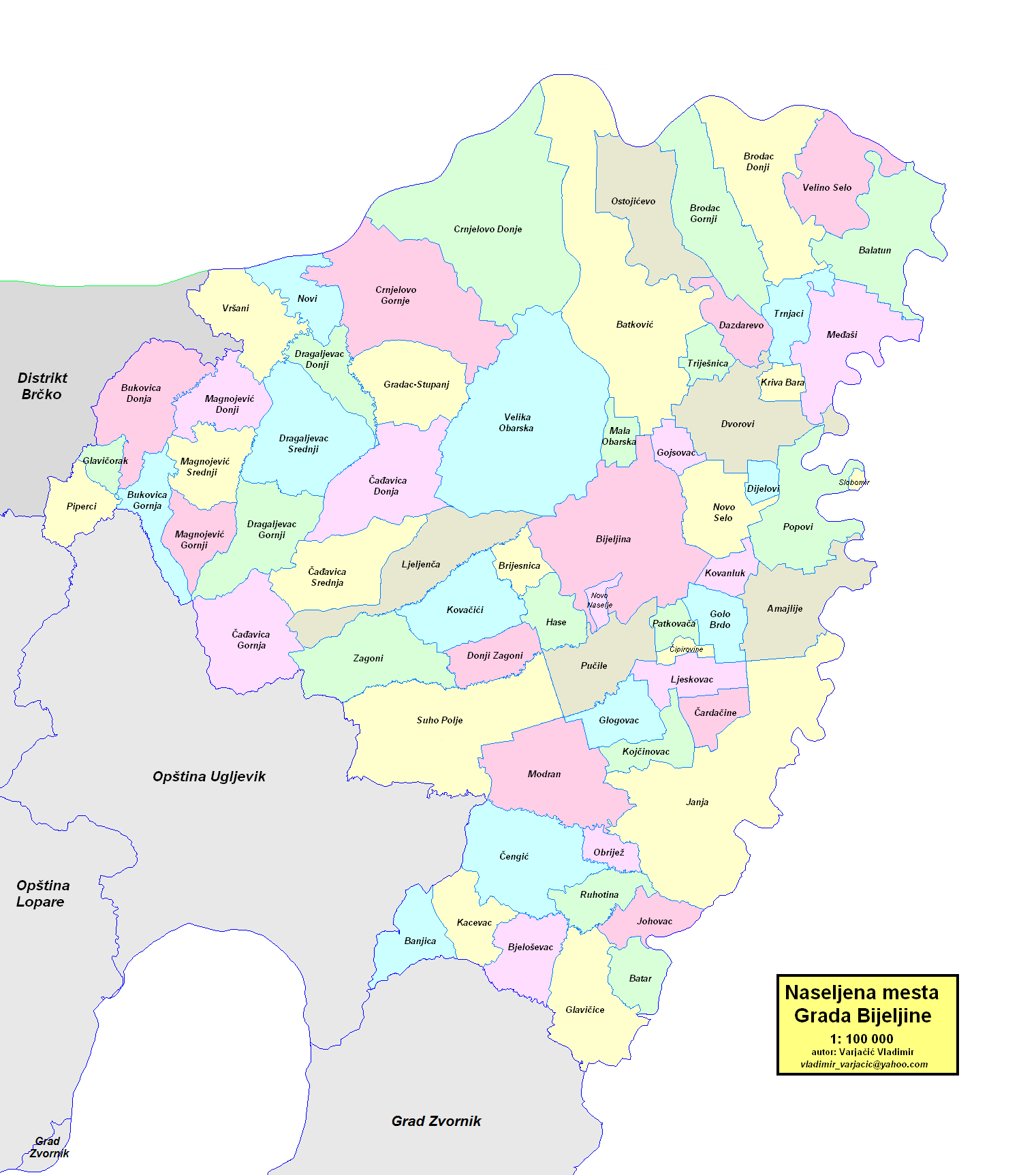

- Location within Bosnia and Herzegovina
- Coordinates: 44°45′24″N 19°12′56″E
- Country: Bosnia and Herzegovina
- Entity: Republika Srpska
- Geographical region: Semberija
- City status: July 2012

Government
  - Mayor: Ljubiša Petrović (Ind.)

Area
  - City: 733.85 km^{2} (283.34 sq mi)
- Elevation: 90 m (300 ft)

Population (2013 census)
  - City: 107,715
  - Density: 146.78/km^{2} (380.16/sq mi)
  - Urban: 45,291
- Time zone: UTC+1 (CET)
  - Summer (DST): UTC+2 (CEST)
- ZIP Code: 76300
- Area code: +387 55
- Website: www.gradbijeljina.org

Bijeljina (Serbian Cyrillic: Бијељина) is a city and municipality in Republika Srpska, Bosnia and Herzegovina. It is the provincial center of Semberija, a geographic region in the country's northeast. As of 2013, it has a population of 107,715 inhabitants, making it the sixth largest city in Bosnia and Herzegovina and the second largest in the Republika Srpska entity after Banja Luka.

== Geography ==
Bijeljina is located in Bosnia and Herzegovina's northeast, bound by the Sava and Drina rivers, extending over the Majevica mountains and covering a land mass of 734 km^{2}. It is a part of the entity of Republika Srpska and is the center of the Semberija region. Semberija is a flat region with a fertile land ideal for agriculture. Due to this, Bijeljina is a major place for food production and trade, particularly wheat and vegetables.

=== Climate ===
Climate data for Bijeljina (1991–2020)
Month	Jan	Feb	Mar	Apr	May	Jun	Jul	Aug	Sep	Oct	Nov	Dec	Year
Record high °C (°F)	20.3 (68.5)	24.0 (75.2)	27.7 (81.9)	32.5 (90.5)	35.0 (95.0)	37.6 (99.7)	43.0 (109.4)	40.7 (105.3)	38.8 (101.8)	31.0 (87.8)	26.4 (79.5)	22.1 (71.8)	43.0 (109.4)
Mean daily maximum °C (°F)	5.4 (41.7)	8.2 (46.8)	13.6 (56.5)	19.0 (66.2)	23.7 (74.7)	27.5 (81.5)	29.5 (85.1)	30.0 (86.0)	24.5 (76.1)	19.0 (66.2)	12.2 (54.0)	6.0 (42.8)	18.2 (64.8)
Daily mean °C (°F)	1.2 (34.2)	3.0 (37.4)	7.5 (45.5)	12.5 (54.5)	17.3 (63.1)	21.3 (70.3)	23.0 (73.4)	22.6 (72.7)	17.3 (63.1)	12.2 (54.0)	7.1 (44.8)	2.2 (36.0)	12.3 (54.1)
Mean daily minimum °C (°F)	−2.4 (27.7)	−1.4 (29.5)	2.1 (35.8)	6.4 (43.5)	11.0 (51.8)	14.9 (58.8)	16.3 (61.3)	16.0 (60.8)	11.6 (52.9)	7.0 (44.6)	3.0 (37.4)	−1.1 (30.0)	7.0 (44.6)
Record low °C (°F)	−23.4 (−10.1)	−26.6 (−15.9)	−19.3 (−2.7)	−6.8 (19.8)	0.6 (33.1)	0.0 (32.0)	8.0 (46.4)	4.5 (40.1)	1.0 (33.8)	−7.5 (18.5)	−8.2 (17.2)	−18.7 (−1.7)	−26.6 (−15.9)
Average precipitation mm (inches)	54.8 (2.16)	46.0 (1.81)	55.3 (2.18)	59.6 (2.35)	83.2 (3.28)	87.1 (3.43)	69.1 (2.72)	56.9 (2.24)	62.9 (2.48)	65.0 (2.56)	60.2 (2.37)	58.8 (2.31)	758.8 (29.87)
Average precipitation days (≥ 1.0 mm)	9.2	8.1	8.3	9.2	11.0	10.0	8.1	6.6	7.7	7.5	8.6	9.2	103.5
Source: NOAA

== History ==
=== Prehistory and Antiquity ===
The earliest established evidence of human life in the area of today's Bijeljina date from the New Stone Age (5000–3000BC). Characteristics of pottery, tools and weapons confirm cultural connections of indigenous inhabitants of Semberija with the eneolithic and Bronze Age cultures – Vučedol, Kostolac and Baden culture.

=== Old Slavs and Middle Ages ===
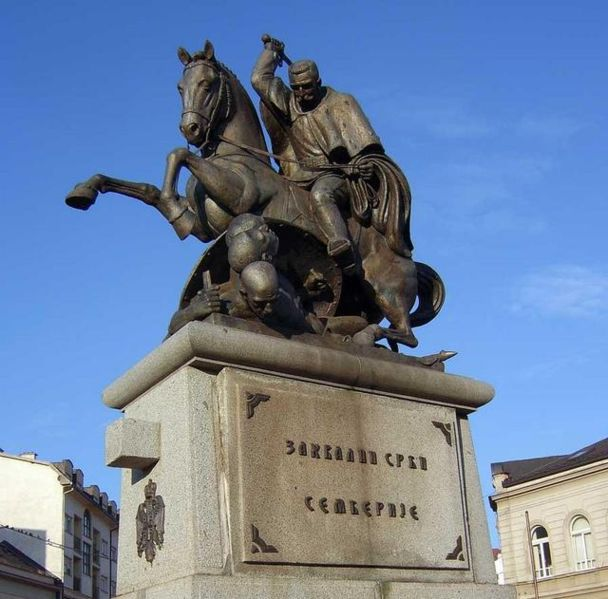
Petar Karađorđević I monument

The oldest archeological site of this period is located on both sides of the Bistrik channel, between the villages of Batković and Ostojićevo and it consists of four smaller sites which date from the period of the 7th to the 12th century. At Jazbina and Oraščić, remains were found of a settlement with half-buried huts, but the most significant discovery was a complex of metallurgical workshop at Čelopek where iron was melted in the 8th century and iron tools were manufactured. The oldest religious building, the Tavna Monastery, was built in the Middle Ages. The region was incorporated into the Bosnian banate during the reign of Stephen Kotromanić. At this time the village Bistrik was called Bistrica and it was the center of the parish, which covered the entire territory of present-day city of Bijeljina.

The first documented mention of the name Bijeljina occurred in 1446. The city fully fell to the Ottomans in 1530. Following the Great Turkish War, it was incorporated into Austrian possession. Upon the conclusion of the Treaty of Passarowitz in 1718, Bijeljina was to be transferred to the Habsburg monarchy. It was retaken by the Ottomans in 1739. Many of the settlements were decimated as a result of unsuccessful Serb rebellions against the occupation.

Austro-Hungarian rule in Bosnia and Herzegovina rule lasted from 1878 until 1918. The name Bijeljina was only used after 1918 and World War I. During Austro-Hungarian rule, the town had the name Bjelina and, before that, Belina or Bilina.

=== Modern history ===
In 1838, the first confessional elementary school was opened. A modern school building was built in 1902. In this school Jovan Dučić, famous Herzegovinian Serb poet, writer and diplomat, worked between 1893 and 1895.

In front of City Hall is a statue of King Peter I of Serbia, who ruled the Kingdom of Serbia between 1903 and 1918. During the Second World War, the Ustaša removed it. After World War II, the communist government refused to return the monument. The first non-communist local government returned the monument in the early 1990s.

==== Bosnian War ====
In September 1991, Bosnian Serbs proclaimed a Serbian Autonomous Oblast with Bijeljina as its capital. In March 1992, the Bosnian referendum on independence was passed with overwhelming support from Bosniaks and Bosnian Croats. Local Bosniak Patriotic League had been established in response to the Bosnian Serb proclamation and started the clashes. On 1–2 April, the SDG and the JNA overtook Bijeljina with little resistance; A massacre was carried out and involved the killing of at least 48 civilians by Serb paramilitary groups. The majority of those killed were Bosniaks (or Bosnian Muslims). The dead included members of other ethnicities, such as Serbs deemed unloyal by the local authorities.

The village of Batković in the municipality of Bijeljina was the site of the Batković camp, believed to be the first concentration camp in operation during the Bosnian War. It was run by Serbs from 1 April 1992 until late January 1996. The prisoners were predominantly ethnic Bosniaks, who were tortured, sexually assaulted, and killed. A "State Commission for the Free transfer of the Civilian Population" or "Commission for the Exchange of Population" was created and headed by Vojkan Đurković, a Major in the SDG.

==== Post-war period ====
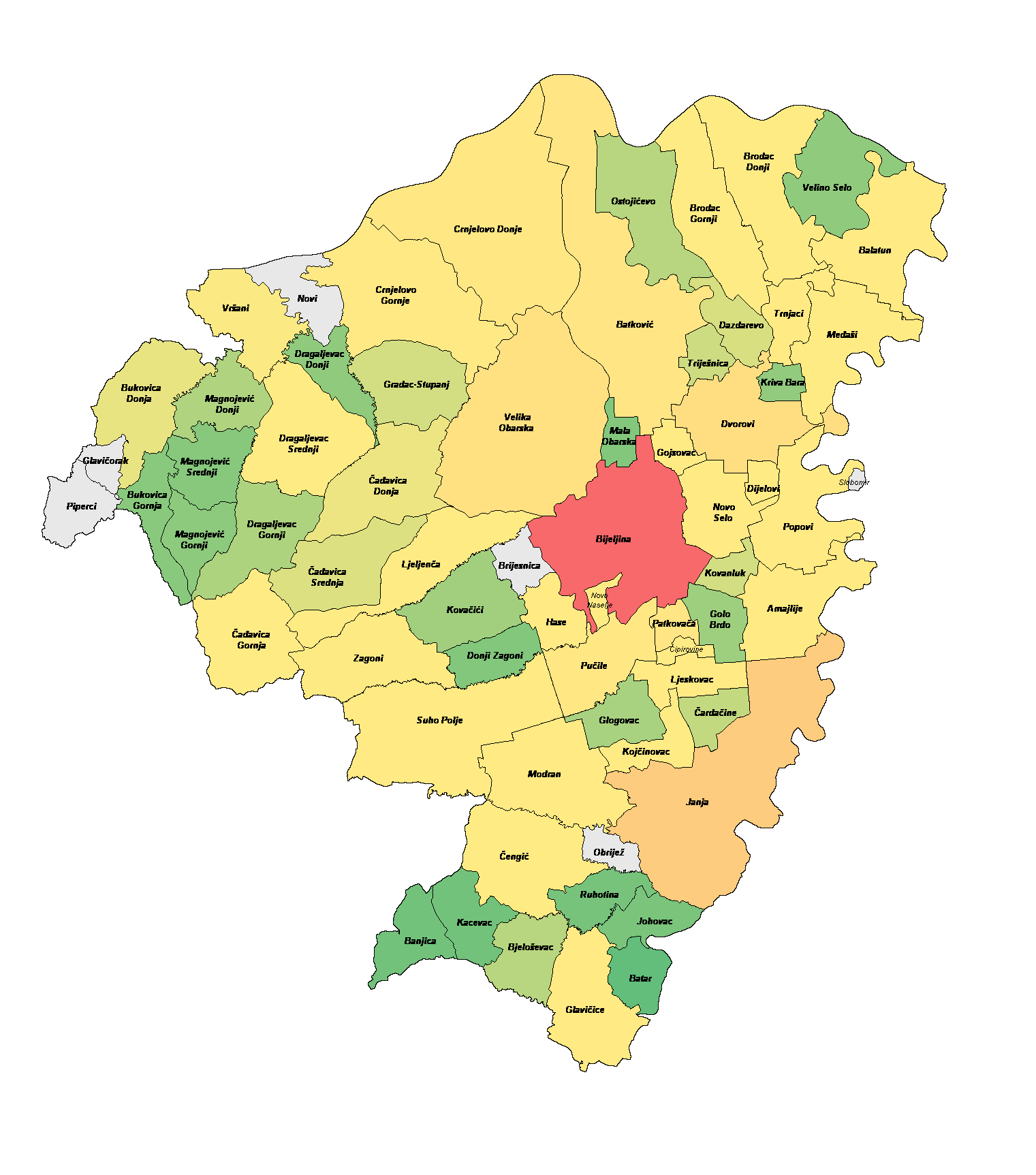
Bijeljina municipality by population proportional to the settlement with the highest and lowest population

The Serb Democratic Party (SDS) governed Bijeljina for 28 years since 1992. Following the 2018 Bosnian general election, in March 2020 mayor Mićo Mićić (governing the city since 2004) left the party to found the Party of Democratic Srpska of Semberija (SDSS) and signed a coalition agreement with Milorad Dodik's SNSD. In June 2020, SDSS and SNSD put SDS in minority in the local council. At the 2020 Bosnian municipal elections, SDS's Ljubiša Petrović became the new mayor, succeeding Mićić.

== Demographics ==
=== Population ===
Population of settlements – Bijeljina municipality
	Settlement	1875	1885	1895	1910	1921	1931	1948	1953	1961	1971	1981	1991	2013
	Total	34,479	38,455	47,468	58,002	58,142	78,602	63,877	86,826	78,890	86,826	92,808	96,988	107,715
1	Amajlije												1,110	1,112
2	Balatun												1,305	1,245
3	Banjica												406	265
4	Batar												382	225
5	Batković												3,483	2,515
6	Bijeljina							12,660	14,303	17,340	24,761	31,124	36,414	42,278
7	Bjeloševac												639	442
8	Brodac Donji												735	668
9	Brodac Gornji												866	767
10	Bukovica Donja												794	568
11	Bukovica Gornja												574	324
12	Čađavica Donja												1,524	577
13	Čađavica Gornja												973	676
14	Čađavica Srednja												693	533
15	Čardačine												370	471
16	Čengić												1,284	859
17	Ćipirovine												274	622
18	Crnjelovo Donje												2,963	2,011
19	Crnjelovo Gornje												1,840	1,279
20	Dazdarevo												435	522
21	Dijelovi													669
22	Donji Zagoni													305
23	Dragaljevac Donji												463	339
24	Dragaljevac Gornji												603	418
25	Dragaljevac Srednji												1,041	741
26	Dvorovi												1,814	4,716
27	Glavičice												1,293	1,070
28	Glogovac												436	402
29	Gojsovac												475	683
30	Golo Brdo												198	377
31	Gradac - Stupanj													509
32	Hase												341	938
33	Janja												10,458	10,542
34	Johovac												338	284
35	Kacevac												351	268
36	Kojčinovac													794
37	Kovačići													383
38	Kovanluk												158	508
39	Kriva Bara												255	345
40	Ljeljenča												967	913
41	Ljeskovac												483	969
42	Magnojević Donji												613	419
43	Magnojević Gornji												665	333
44	Magnojević Srednji												332	318
45	Mala Obarska													305
46	Međaši												896	858
47	Modran												1,411	963
48	Novo Naselje												1,290	832
49	Novo Selo												122	1,153
50	Ostojićevo												595	440
51	Patkovača												646	2,569
52	Popovi												1,134	1,238
53	Pučile												769	2,090
54	Ruhotina												446	276
55	Suho Polje												1,503	1,154
56	Triješnica												290	496
57	Trnjaci												639	1,074
58	Velika Obarska												3,549	3,902
59	Velino Selo												451	342
60	Vršani												1,249	614
61	Zagoni												1,766	619

=== Ethnic composition ===
Ethnic composition – Bijeljina city
	2013	1991	1981	1971
Total	42,278 (100,0%)	36,414 (100,0%)	31,124 (100,0%)	24,761 (100,0%)
Serbs	35,798 (84.67%)	10,450 (28.70%)	7,866 (25.27%)	7,630 (30.81%)
Bosniaks	4,469 (10.57%)	19,024 (52.24%)	15,015 (48.24%)	14,929 (60.29%)
Others	632 (1.495%)	3,122 (8.574%)	521 (1.674%)	349 (1.409%)
Unaffiliated	502 (1.187%)			
Roma	338 (0.799%)		976 (3.136%)	104 (0.420%)
Croats	315 (0.745%)	366 (1.005%)	409 (1.314%)	677 (2.734%)
Yugoslavs	127 (0.300%)	3,452 (9.480%)	6,028 (19.37%)	637 (2.573%)
Unknown	35 (0.083%)			
Montenegrins	29 (0.069%)		60 (0.193%)	71 (0.287%)
Macedonians	14 (0.033%)		64 (0.206%)	63 (0.254%)
Slovenes	11 (0.026%)		17 (0.055%)	20 (0.081%)
Albanians	8 (0.019%)		144 (0.463%)	237 (0.957%)
Hungarians			24 (0.077%)	44 (0.178%)

Ethnic composition – Bijeljina municipality
	2013	1991	1981	1971
Total	107,715 (100.0%)	96,988 (100.0%)	92,808 (100.0%)	86,826 (100.0%)
Serbs	91,784 (85.21%)	57,389 (59.17%)	56,029 (60.37%)	60,595 (69.79%)
Bosniaks	13,090 (12.15%)	30,229 (31.17%)	24,282 (26.16%)	23,343 (26.88%)
Others	793 (0.736%)	4,452 (4.590%)	1,155 (1.245%)	649 (0.747%)
Unaffiliated	674 (0.626%)			
Croats	515 (0.478%)	492 (0.507%)	500 (0.539%)	806 (0.928%)
Roma	496 (0.460%)		1,359 (1.464%)	168 (0.193%)
Yugoslavs	151 (0.140%)	4 426 (4.563%)	9,090 (9.794%)	747 (0.860%)
Unknown	102 (0.095%)			
Montenegrins	36 (0.033%)		80 (0.086%)	90 (0.104%)
Macedonians	33 (0.031%)		89 (0.096%)	81 (0.093%)
Slovenes	22 (0.020%)		25 (0.027%)	24 (0.028%)
Albanians	17 (0.016%)		164 (0.177%)	258 (0.297%)
Turks	1 (0.001%)			
Ukrainians	1 (0,001%)			
Hungarians			35 (0,038%)	65 (0,075%)

== Architecture ==
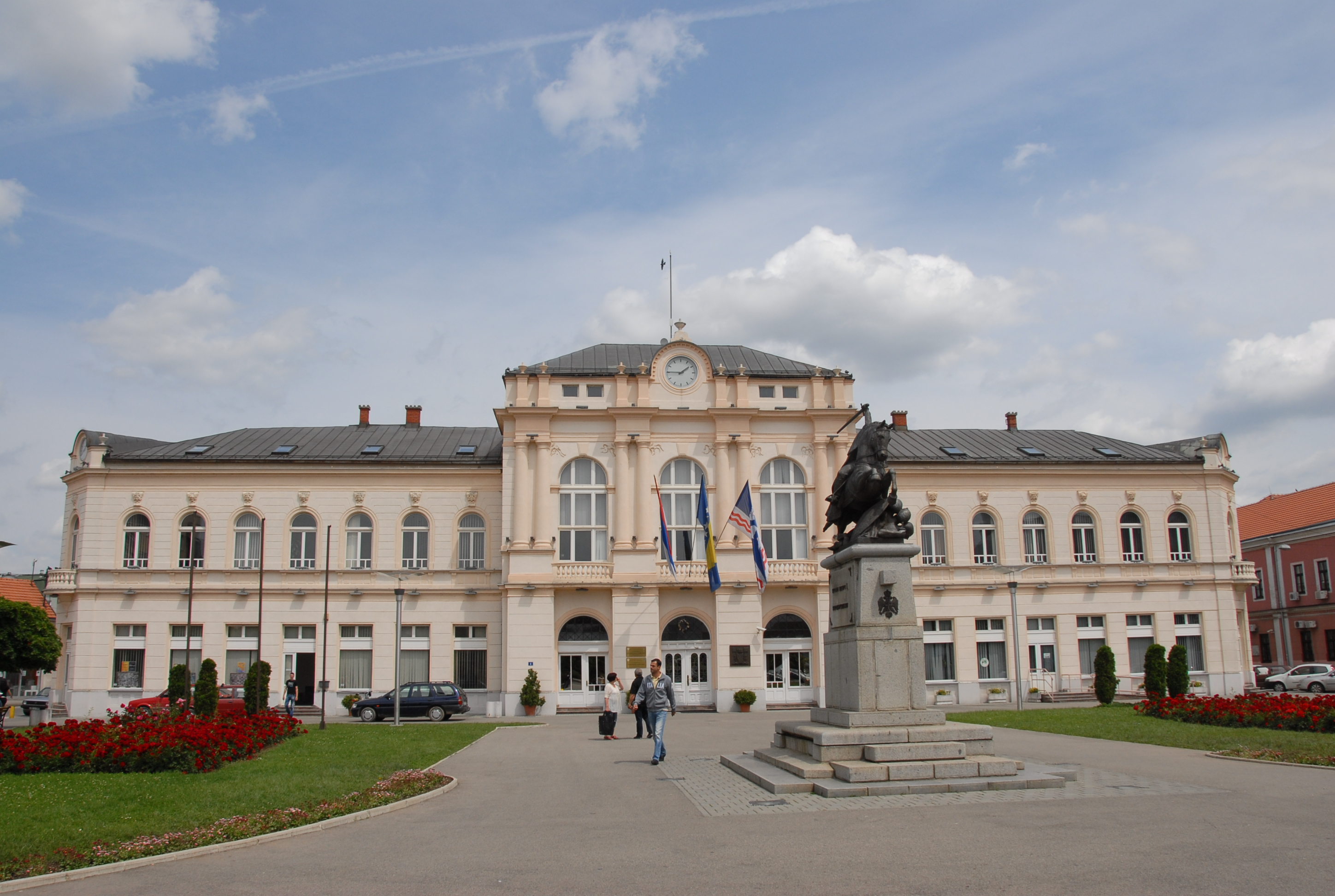
The assembly building of Bijeljina

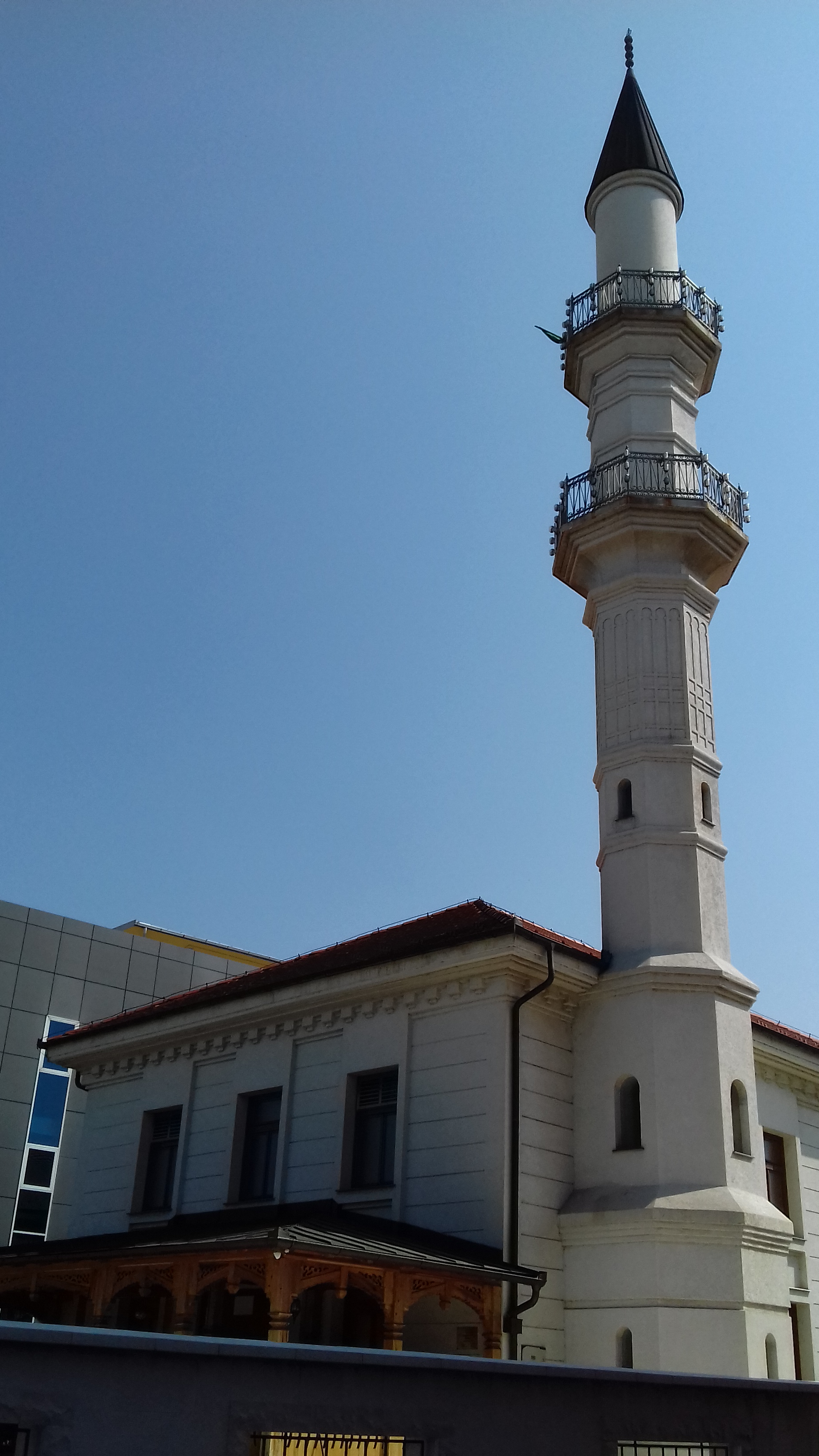
The Atik mosque (demolished during the war and reconstructed since) by the town square

The Atik Mosque was built between 1520 and 1566, during the period of Sultan Suleiman the Magnificent. It was used as a defensive bastion in the Austro-Turkish War and converted to a Catholic church by the Austrians during 1718-1739. After the Treaty of Belgrade, it reverted back to a mosque, and went through several renovations in the 19th and early 20th centuries. The mosque was completely destroyed on 13 March 1993 and rebuilt where it stood before.

The Serbian Orthodox Church (Svetog Đorđa) of Saint George is located at the site of an older church, which was first mentioned in 1735. The current building dates back from the early 1870s and represents a mix of Russian and Byzantine style architecture, with a dome and a tall tower.

The Semberija Museum is located in a historic building and has four exhibition halls. The exhibitions span a vast historical period, ranging from the Neolithic, through the Roman era and the Middle Ages, all the way to the 20th century.

The Basil of Ostrog Monastery in the center of Bijeljina is a newly built monastery (2001) dedicated to St Basil of Ostrog.

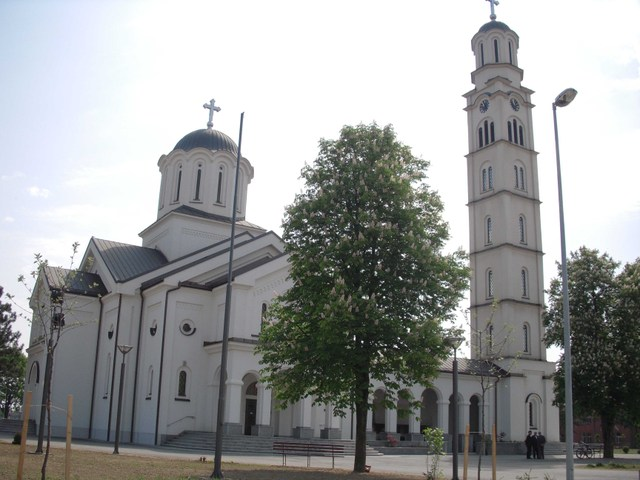
Church in Bijeljina

Filip Višnjić Library is the oldest cultural institution in Bijeljina - founded in 1932 thanks to prominent people including Dr Vojislav Kecmanović, Dr Joakim Perendija, and Professor Nikola Mačkić among others. It played a major role in raising the cultural level in Semberija and has over 120,000 books.

The Tavna Monastery is located in the southern part of the Bijeljina municipality. The date of foundation is hidden somewhere in the shadows of the far past. The chronicles of monasteries Tronoša and Peć say it was built by Stefan Dragutin's sons Vladislav and Uroš II Milutin. Stefan Dragutin was the King of Serbia from 1276 to 1282 and king of Srem from 1282 to 1316. The present church of monastery Tavna is built in the same place as the original one. The Tavna Monastery is older than the other monasteries in the region such as Ozrena, Liplja, Vozuce and Gostovica. Tavna was damaged in the first years of Turkish rule, but was restored by the people. This was not the only time the monastery was damaged. It was damaged many times during the Turkish period and the Second World War. Between 1941 and 1945, Tavna was bombed by the Ustaše. One of the gravestones says "Zdravko Jovanović - Killed 1943 by the Ustaša Blue Division protecting and defending the monastery". After World War II, the Tavna monastery was rebuilt.

== Education ==
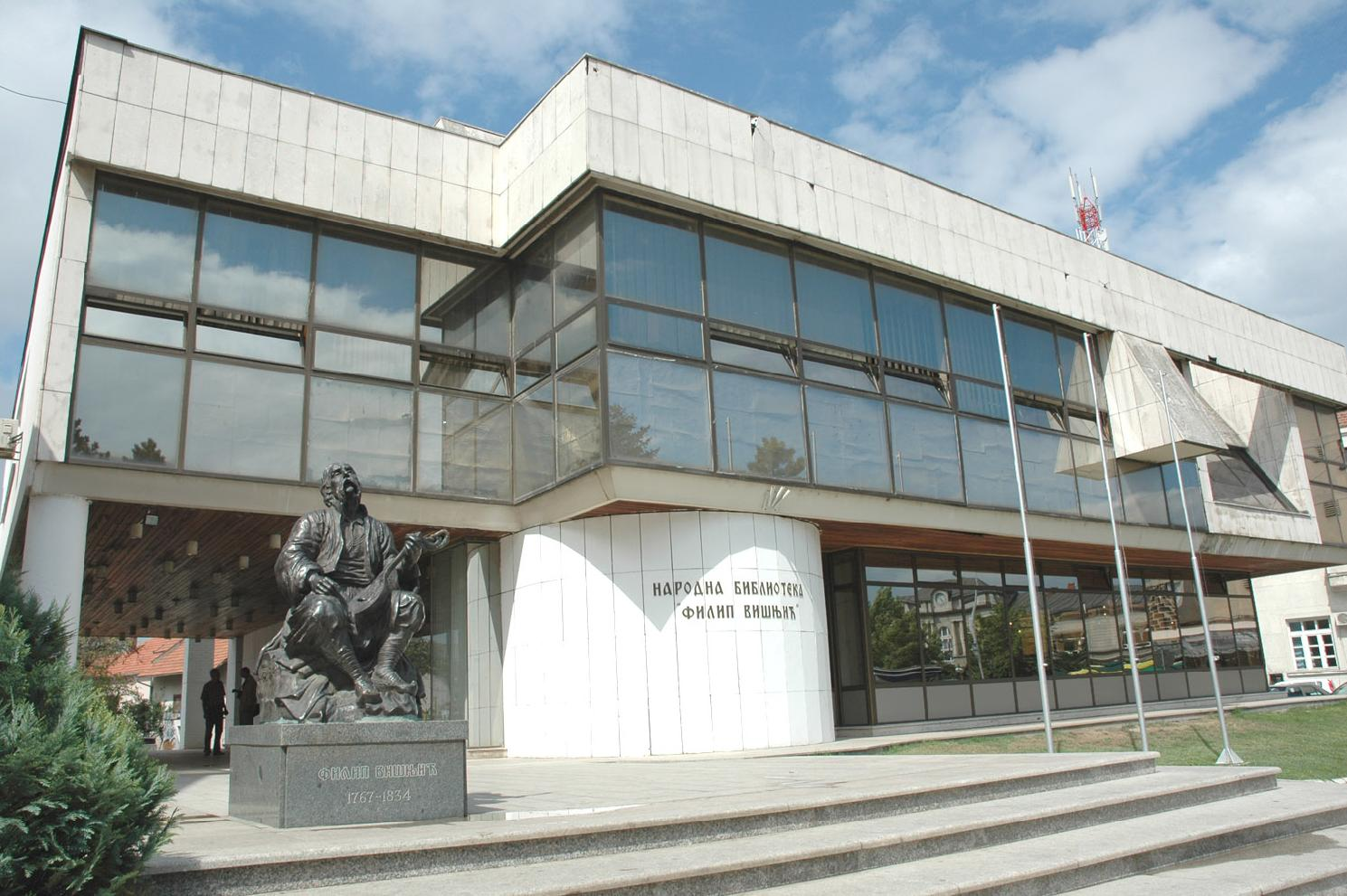
Library in Bijeljina

The first primary school in Bijeljina was opened in 1938. After World War II, changes were made to the school system, and in 1951 the first elementary school was opened. In 1956, a second elementary school was opened. The third and fourth elementary schools opened in 1959 and 1966, respectively.

Since 1953, a basic music school has been operating in the city.

Primary schools in Bijeljina include the following: OŠ Sveti Sava, OŠ Knez Ivo od Semberije, OŠ Vuk Karadžić, OŠ Jovan Dučić. There are several high schools operating in the city, such as Filip Višnjić Gymnasium, Stevan Stojanović Mokranjac Music School, an agricultural high school, a medicine highschool, an economic and a technical school. The University of Bijeljina has several faculties: Law, Economics, Business Economics and Education. The main private universities in the city are Slobomir P University and University Sinergija.

== Economy ==
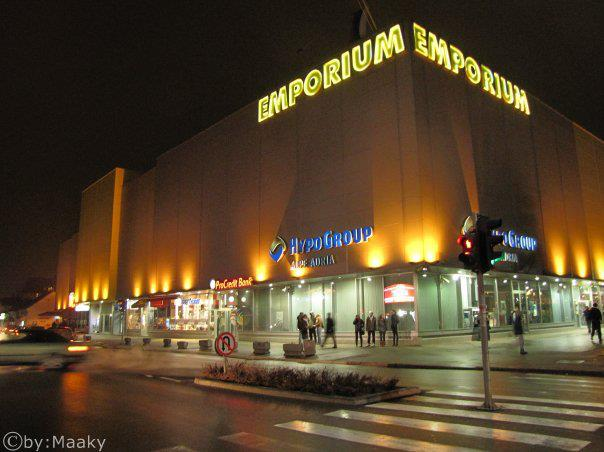
Emporium Shopping Center in Bijeljina

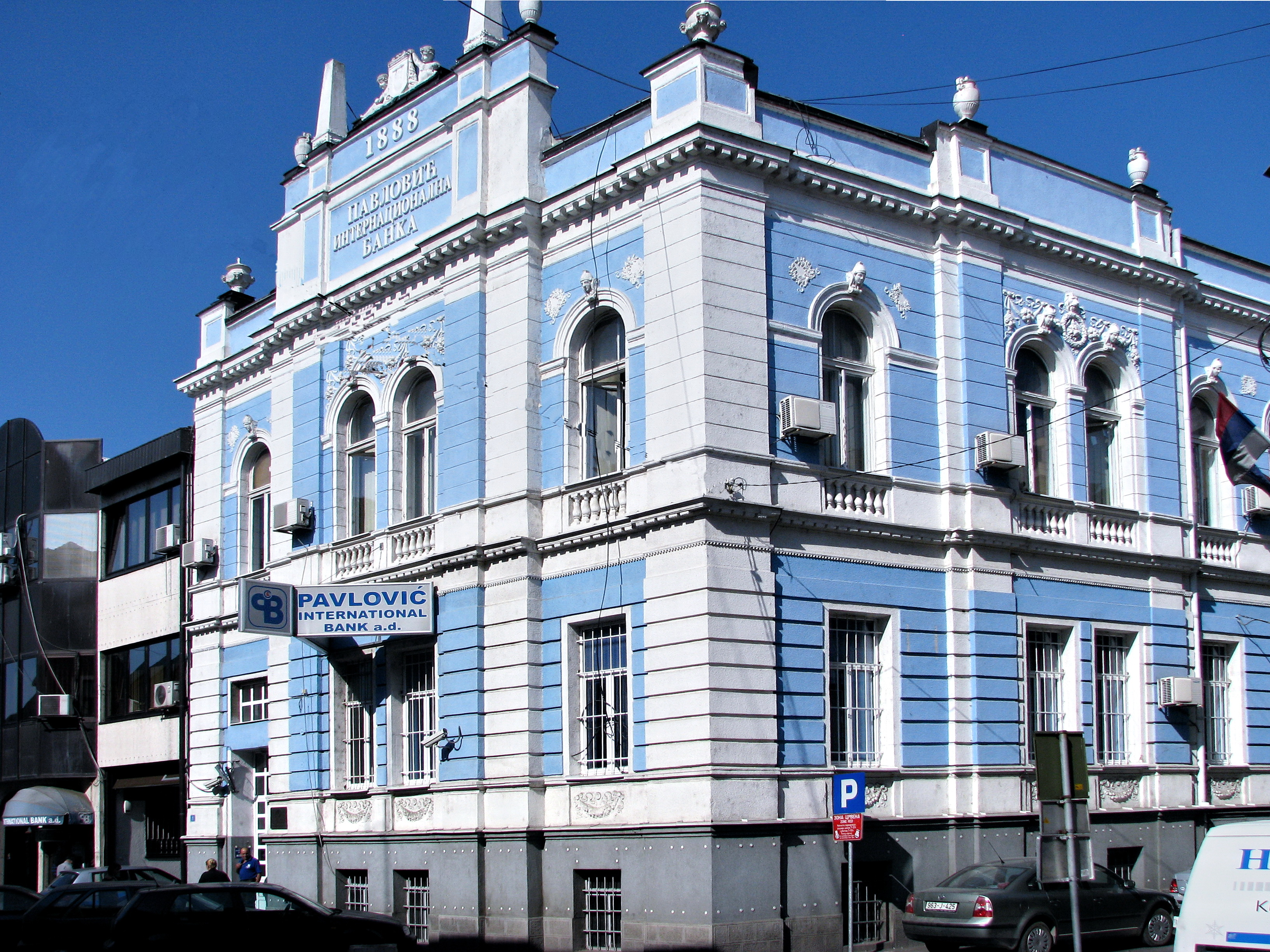
Pavlović bank

The following table gives a preview of total number of registered people employed in legal entities per their core activity (as of 2018):

Activity	Total
Agriculture, forestry and fishing	336
Mining and quarrying	25
Manufacturing	3,706
Electricity, gas, steam and air conditioning supply	454
Water supply; sewerage, waste management and remediation activities	450
Construction	1,129
Wholesale and retail trade, repair of motor vehicles and motorcycles	5,813
Transportation and storage	935
Accommodation and food services	1,096
Information and communication	551
Financial and insurance activities	514
Real estate activities	22
Professional, scientific and technical activities	809
Administrative and support service activities	312
Public administration and defense; compulsory social security	1,836
Education	1,774
Human health and social work activities	1,461
Arts, entertainment and recreation	330
Other service activities	482
Total	22,035

== Transportation ==
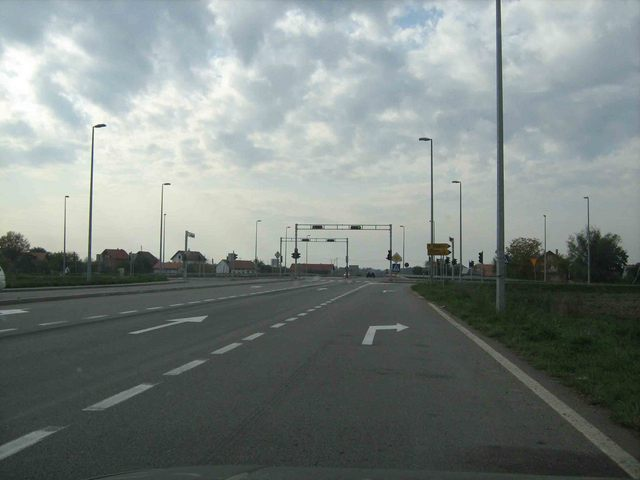
Bypass in Bijeljina

The main bus station in Bijeljina is located in the central zone of the city and is owned by Semberija Transport.

The first railway line through Bijeljina was the narrow gauge Bosanska Rača–Ugljevik railway built in 1916-1918. In 1950, Bijeljina was linked to Šid in Serbia when the normal gauge railway was opened. The narrow gauge railway was abandoned in 1979, after which Bijeljina remained as a terminus. The Bijeljina–Šid railway was abandoned in 2005, and there has been no rail traffic in the city since then.

== Tourism ==
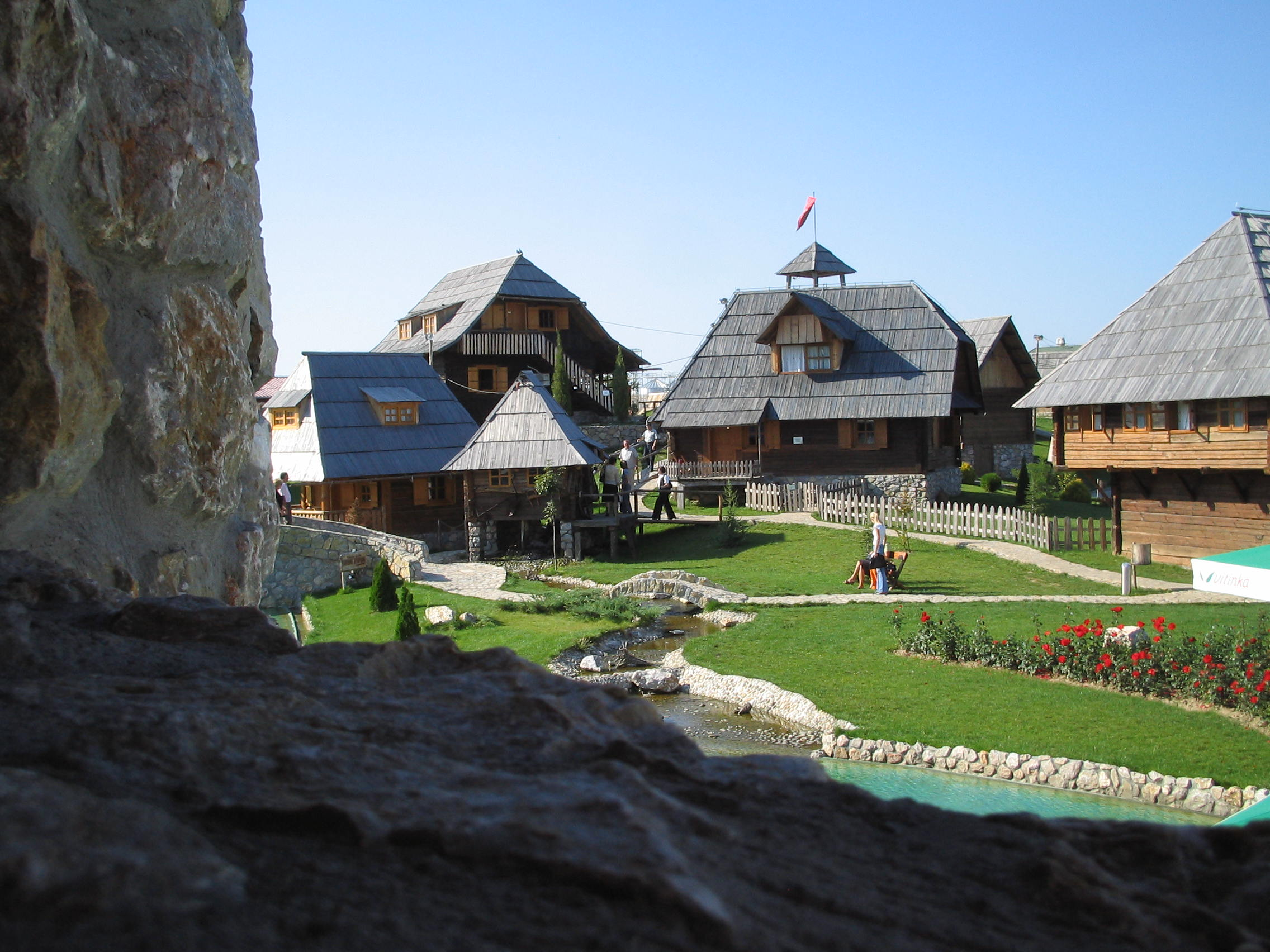
Etno village Stanišići

Bijeljina holds an international folklore festival known as the Semberija folk fest.

The Dvorovi Spa is one of the most famous spas in Republika Srpska. Dvorovi Spa was formed after the discovery of thermal water, while drilling for oil in 1956, near Dvorovi village in Semberija. The depth of the source is at 1350 meters, the water is oligomineral, and the water temperature is 75°C.

== Sports ==
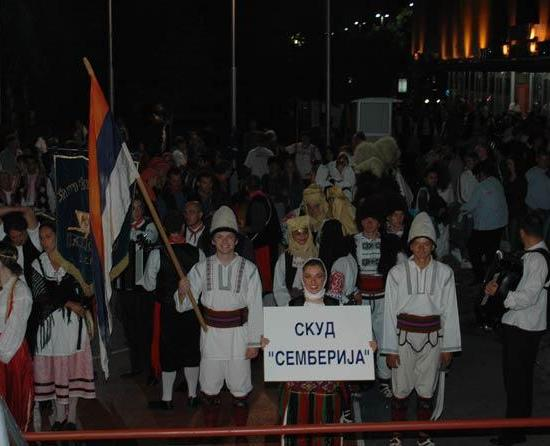
SKUD Semberija at the Semberija folk fest in Bijeljina 2006

Bijeljina has one major stadium known as the Bijeljina City Stadium. The stadium is the home ground of FK Radnik Bijeljina, which competes in the Premier League of Bosnia and Herzegovina. Radnik won the Bosnian Cup in 2016. Their president is Predrag Perković, while their manager is Vlado Jagodić.

OFK Zenit Bijeljina is a young club from Bijeljina but their youth teams had earned a lot of medals in Bosnia and Herzegovina, Serbia, Slovenia, Romania, Austria, and Germany. Their home ground is "Zenit Arena" in Novo Selo, located 5 minutes away from the city center. OFK Zenit competes in the leagues of the Football Association of Republika Srpska (FSRS). They have a contract with Zvijezda 09 (team in the Premier League of BiH) to Zenit's youth teams play like Zvijezda 09's players.

Bijeljina was designated a European City of Sport in 2020.

Basketball clubs include:

- KK Budućnost Bijeljina;
- KK Radnik Bijeljina;
- KK Fenix Basket Bijeljina.

Volleyball clubs include:

- OK Radnik Bijeljina;
- OK Libero Bijeljina.

Handball clubs include:

- RK Bijeljina;
- ZRK Bijeljina.

== Twin towns – sister cities ==
Bijeljina is twinned with:

- Azov, Russia
- Brașov, Romania
- Budva, Montenegro
- Goraždevac, Kosovo (Note: As Serbia since Bosnia and Herzegovina does not recognize Kosovo.)
- Kosjerić, Serbia
- Kruševac, Serbia
- Kumanovo, North Macedonia
- Langenhagen, Germany
- Leskovac, Serbia
- Ruse, Bulgaria
- Zrenjanin, Serbia

== Notable people ==
- Admir Smajić, footballer, Olympic bronze medalist
- Ana Mirjana Račanović, Miss Bosnia and Herzegovina 2001
- Bego Ćatić, footballer
- Cican Stankovic, Austrian footballer
- Cvijetin Mijatović, Chairman of the Collective Presidency of Yugoslavia, Yugoslav People's Hero
- Darko Todorović, Bosnian footballer
- Dejan Joveljic, Serbian footballer
- Duško Kondor, human rights activist, professor of sociology and philosophy
- Filip Višnjić, epic poet
- Frenkie, rapper
- Goran Jelisić, Bosnian Serb war criminal
- Luka Jović, Serbian footballer
- Ljubiša Savić, Bosnian Serb paramilitary commander, politician, and former police chief of Bijeljina
- Mirko Ilić, Serbian graphic designer and comics artist
- Mirza Begić, Slovenian basketball player
- Nevenka Tadić, neuropsychiatrist and mother of former president of Serbia Boris Tadić
- Nihad Hrustanbegovic, composer, accordionist and pianist
- Nikola Kovač, Professional Counter-Strike 2 player
- Miloš Bojanić, folk singer
- Rodoljub Čolaković, politician and writer
- Rodoljub Roki Vulović, Bosnian Serb singer, author, performer, former professor, and former school director
- Savo Milošević, Serbian footballer, UEFA Euro 2000 Top scorer
- Srđan Vuletić, filmmaker
- Svetozar Marković, Serbian footballer

== See also ==
- Janja
- Semberija
- Slobomir

== Bibliography ==
- Roksandić, Drago (1 October 2007). "Posavska krajina/granica od 1718. do 1739. godine". Ekonomska i ekohistorija: časopis za gospodarsku povijest i povijest okoliša (in Serbo-Croatian) (3): 62–82. eISSN 1849-0190.
- Pelidija, Enes (1989). Bosanski ejalet od Karlovačkog do Požarevačkog mira 1699 - 1718 (in Serbo-Croatian). Sarajevo. pp. 237–259.
