= Operation Amber Star =

Joint military operation

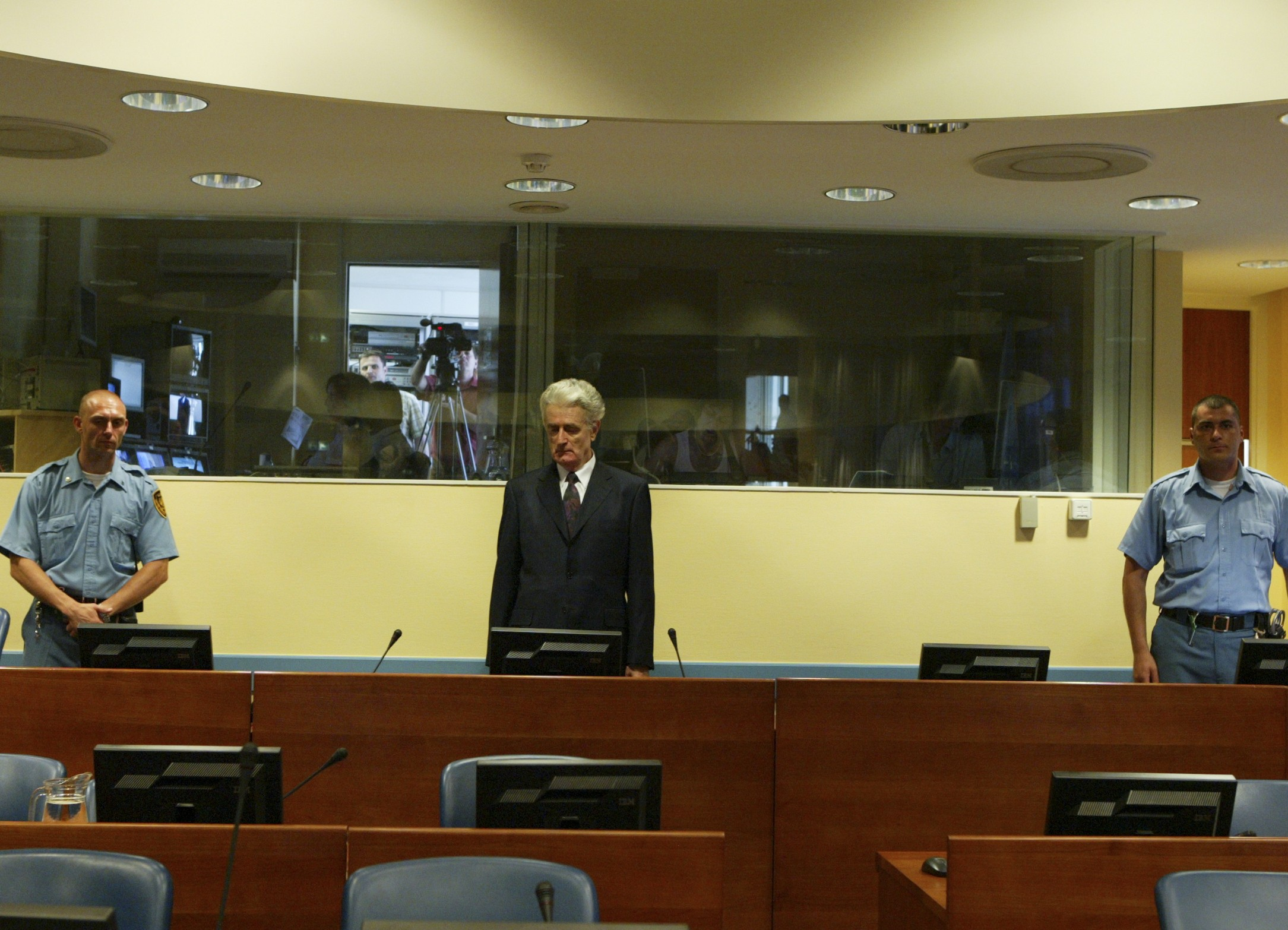
Radovan Karadzic on trial at the ICTY

Operation Amber Star was a joint military operation to hunt down Bosnian war criminals and bring them to justice at the International Criminal Tribunal for the Former Yugoslavia (ICTY). The operation combined the special forces and intelligence agencies of five countries- the United States, the United Kingdom, France, Germany, and the Netherlands. The operation was assembled at the Patch Barracks in Stuttgart, Germany. When the ICTY was created, it had limited resources and capabilities. On top of this NATO outright refused to make the arrests of indicted war criminals. This meant that the tribunal had almost no ability to actually perform the duties it was created for. Operation Amber Star helped lend teeth to the tribunal by helping to ensure all of the indicted war criminals were brought before the ICTY. While the operation was designed to be a joint mission, individual government and special forces usually worked separately on individual targets. For example, the US used Delta Force to target the Serb leader Radovan Karadzic specifically.
