= Luka camp =

Bosnian War concentration camp

Luka
- Concentration Camp
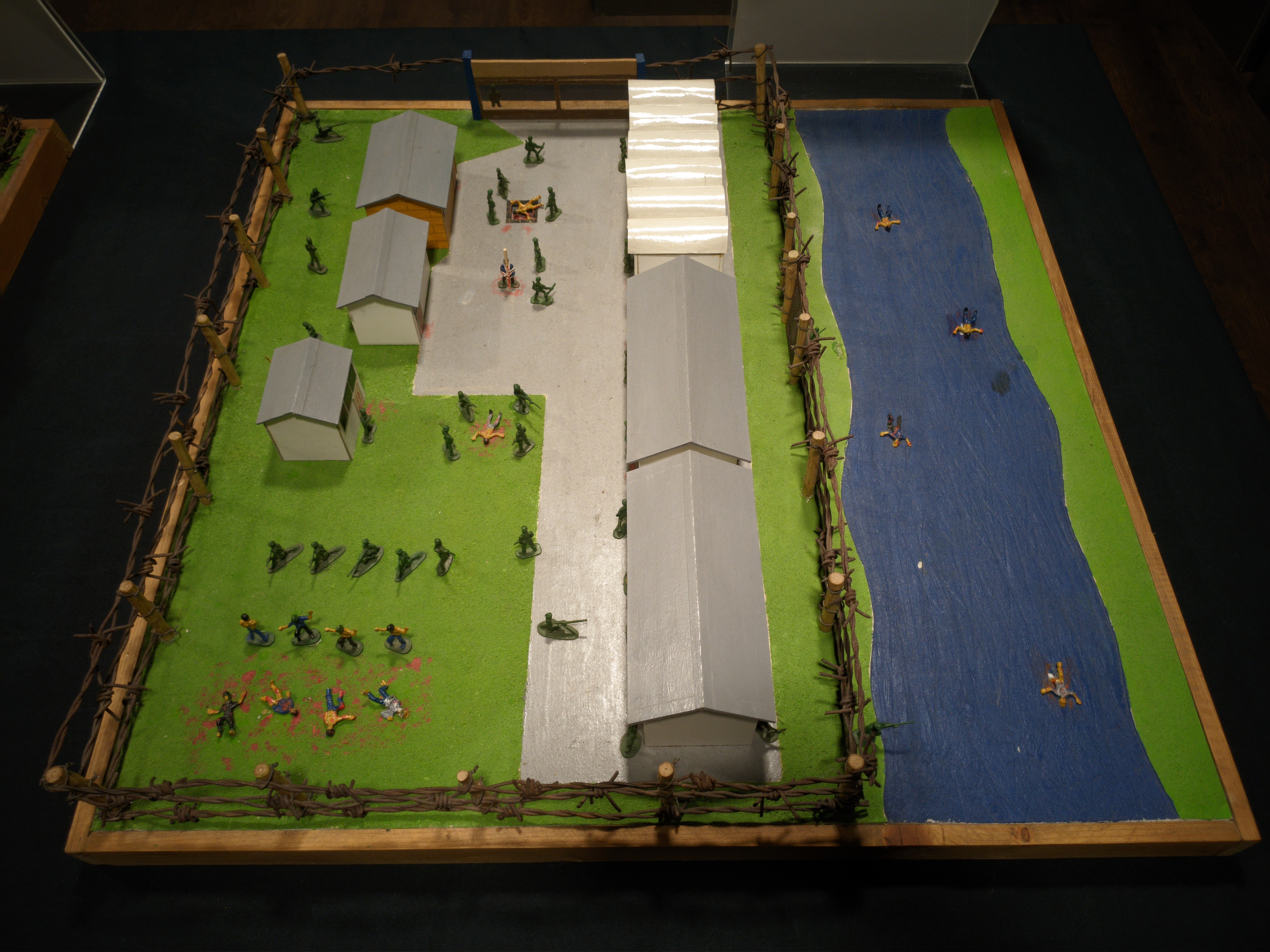
- Camp model exhibited in the Museum of Crimes against Humanity and Genocide.

- Location in Bosnia and Herzegovina
- Coordinates: 44°52′50″N 18°48′58″E
- Location: Brčko, Bosnia and Herzegovina
- Operated by: Bosnian Serb forces
- Operational: May – July 1992
- Inmates: Bosniaks; Croats

Luka camp was a concentration camp run by Army of Republika Srpska, in Brčko, Bosnia and Herzegovina, during the Bosnian War.

== Background ==
Beginning in May 1992 until early July 1992, Serb forces held hundreds of Bosniaks and Croats at the camp, a warehouse facility on the Sava river, in inhumane conditions and under armed guard with detainees being systematically killed. Items were stolen from prisoners in Luka.

== Trials ==
On 14 December 1999, Goran Jelisić was found guilty of having committed crimes against humanity and violating the customs of war by the International Criminal Tribunal for the Former Yugoslavia was sentenced to 40 years imprisonment.

In October 2004, Ranko Češić pleaded guilty to having committed 10 murders and two cases of sexual assault at the camp and was sentenced to 18 years imprisonment.

On 14 November 2011, Branko Pudić, a guard at the camp, was indicted for having "exercised torture on a daily basis, inhumanely treated and inflicted sufferings to the civilian population at the camp".

On 21 December 2011, Monika Karan-Ilić (née Simeunović), Goran Jelisić's accomplice and "girlfriend" at the time, was detained on suspicion of having committed war crimes against non-Serbs at the camp. In 2013 she was found guilty of abusing inmates and sentenced to 4 years in prison. Monika's sentence was later reduced to 2.5 years, and she was later released. She died in a car crash 21 August 2021.
