= Batković =

Batković Батковић (Serbian)
- Village (Selo)
- Location within Bosnia and Herzegovina
- Coordinates: 44°51′13″N 19°11′47″E
- Country: Bosnia and Herzegovina
- Entity: Republika Srpska
- City: Bijeljina
- Time zone: UTC+1 (CET)
  - Summer (DST): UTC+2 (CEST)

Batković (Serbian Cyrillic: Батковић) is a village in the City of Bijeljina, Republika Srpska, Bosnia and Herzegovina.
