= List of rivers of Bosnia and Herzegovina =

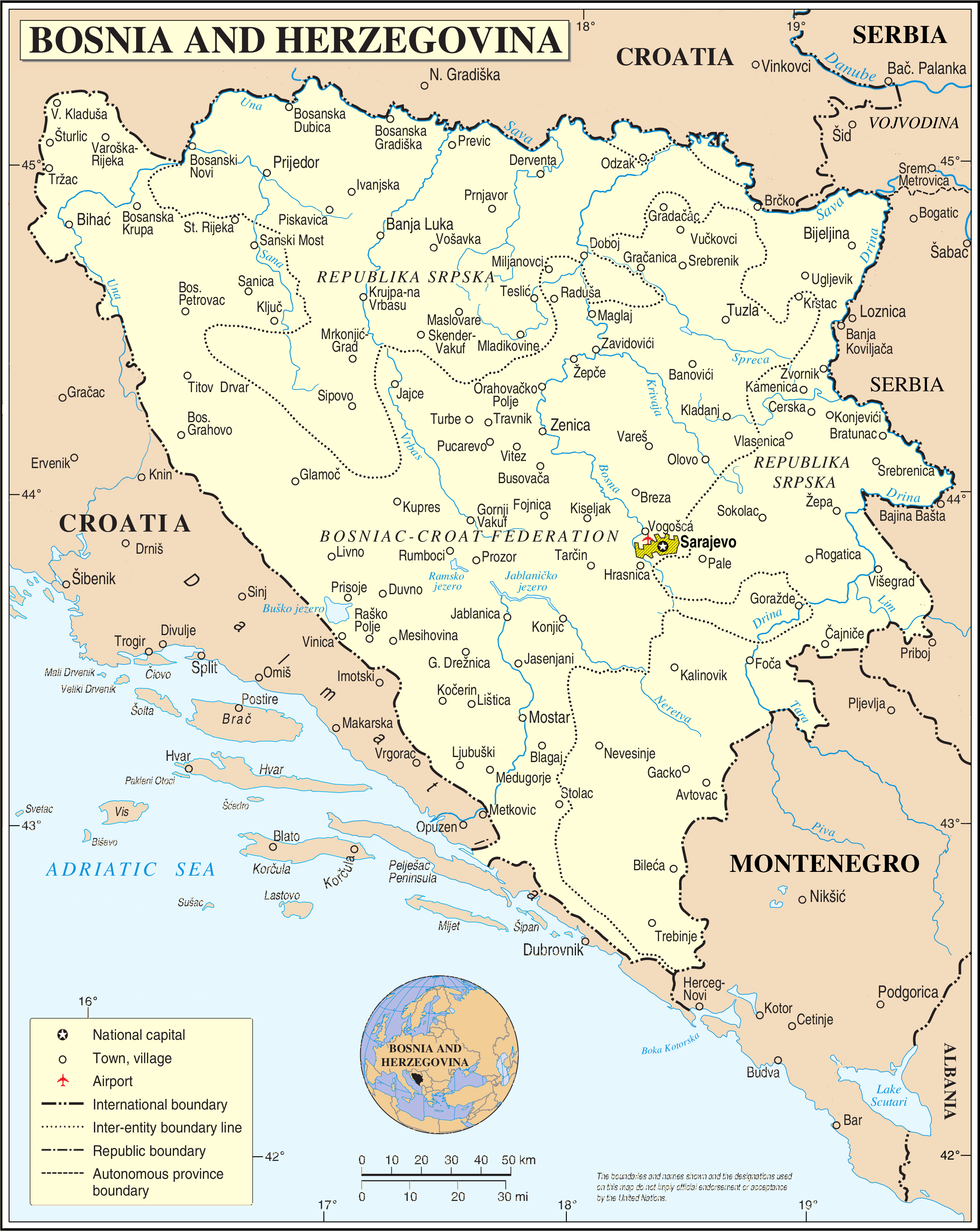
Main rivers in Bosnia and Hercegovina

This is a list of rivers of Bosnia and Herzegovina ordered alphabetically.

== Draining into the Black Sea ==
- Glina (right tributary to Kupa)
  - Glinica (right tributary)
    - Bojna
    - Bužimica
  - Kladušnica (right tributary in Velika Kladuša)
- Korana (right tributary to Kupa)
  - Mutnica (Korana) (right tributary)
- Sava (right tributary of the Danube)
  - Bosna (right tributary)
    - Babina rijeka (right tributary near/in Zenica)
    - Fojnička rijeka (left tributary)
      - Lepenica (Fojnička rijeka) (left tributary)
        - Bijela rijeka (Lepenica) (right tributary near Kreševo)
        - Crna rijeka (Lepenica) (right tributary near Kreševo)
        - Kreševka (right tributary in Kreševo)
      - Željeznica (Fojnička rijeka) (right tributary)
        - Dragača (left tributary in Fojnica)
    - Goruša (right tributary in Visoko)
    - Krivaja (right tributary in Zavidovići)
      - Stupčanica (source of the Krivaja (in confluence with the Bioštica) and right tributary in Olovo)
      - Bioštica (source of the Krivaja (in confluence with the Stupčanica) and left tributary in Olovo)
        - Kaljina (left tributary)
      - Orlja (left tributary)
      - Tribija (left tributary)
        - Vijaka (left tributary)
      - Duboštica (left tributary)
      - Župeljeva (right tributary)
        - Mala Maoča (left tributary)
      - Velika Maoča (right tributary)
    - Lašva (left tributary)
      - Bila (left tributary)
      - Grlovnica (right tributary)
      - Komašnica (right tributary near Travnik)
      - Kruščica (right tributary)
    - Ljubina (Bosna) (right tributary in Semizovac)
    - Miljacka (right tributary)
      - Mokranjska Miljacka (right tributary)
      - Koševski Potok (right tributary)
      - Paljanska Miljacka (left tributary)
        - Bistrica (Paljanska Miljacka) (left tributary)
    - Misoča (right tributary)
      - Blaža (left tributary)
    - Ribnica (right tributary near Kakanj)
      - Mala rijeka (Ribnica) (left tributary near Kakanj)
    - Stavnja (left tributary in Ilijaš)
      - Mala rijeka (Stavnja) (left tributary)
    - Trstionica (right tributary near Kakanj)
      - Bukovica (Trstionica) (left tributary near Kraljeva Sutjeska)
    - Usora (left tributary south of Doboj)
      - Mala Usora
      - Velika Usora
    - Željeznica (right tributary)
      - Crna rijeka (Bosna)
      - Kasindolska (right tributary)
    - Zujevina (left tributary)
  - Brka (right tributary in Brčko)
  - Dašnica (right tributary in Semberija)
  - Drina (right tributary)
    - Piva (source of the Drina (in confluence with Tara) and left tributary)
    - Tara (source of the Drina (in confluence with Piva) and right tributary)
    - Ćehotina (right tributary)
    - Bistrica (Drina) (left tributary)
      - Govza (right tributary)
    - Prača (left tributary)
      - Rakitnica (Prača) (left tributary)
    - Drinjača (left tributary)
      - Jadar (right tributary)
        - Kravica (right tributary)
    - Janja (left tributary in Semberija)
    - Janjina (right tributary)
    - Kolina (left tributary)
    - Lim (right tributary)
    - Rzav (right tributary in Višegrad)
      - Beli Rzav
      - Crni Rzav
    - Sutjeska (left tributary south from Foča)
      - Hrčavka (left tributary)
  - Jablanica (right tributary near Bosanska Gradiška)
    - Bukovica (Jablanica) (right tributary)
    - Ljubina (Jablanica) (right tributary)
  - Jurkovica (right tributary near Bosanska Gradiška)
  - Lukavac (right tributary in Semberija)
  - Ljubija (left tributary)
  - Ukrina (right tributary near Bosanski Brod)
    - Ilova (right tributary)
    - Mala Ukrina
    - Velika Ukrina
  - Una (right tributary)
    - Srebrenica (right tributary)
    - Krka (right tributary)
    - Unac (right tributary)
    - Čava (right tributary)
    - Klokot (left tributary)
    - Krušnica (right tributary in Bosanska Krupa)
    - Mlječanica (right tributary)
      - Knežica (left tributary)
    - Sana (right tributary)
      - Blija (left tributary in Sanski Most)
      - Dabar (left tributary south from Sanski Most)
      - Gomjenica (right tributary near Prijedor)
        - Bistrica (Gomjenica) (right tributary)
        - Krivaja (Gomjenica) (right tributary)
      - Japra (left tributary near Bosanski Novi)
        - Japrica (left tributary)
      - Kijevska rijeka (right tributary)
      - Kozica (right tributary)
        - Jovica (right tributary)
    - Strigova (right tributary)
      - Kriva rijeka (right tributary)
      - Mekinja (left tributary)
  - Vrbas (right tributary)
    - Bistrica (Vrbas) (right tributary near Gornji Vakuf)
      - Mutnica (Bistrica) (left tributary)
    - Bunta (left tributary between Gornji Vakuf and Bugojno)
    - Crna rijeka (Vrbas) (left tributary in Mrkonjić Grad)
    - Desna (left tributary before Gornji Vakuf)
    - Dragočaj (left tributary north of Banja Luka)
    - Duboka (left tributary in Bugojno)
    - Pliva (right tributary in Jajce)
      - Janj (right tributary)
        - Kupreška rijeka (right tributary)
    - Ugar (right tributary downflow of Jajce)
      - Ilomska (right tributary downflow of Vitovlje), Travnik
        - Crna rijeka (Ilomska) (left tributary below Petrovo polje)
        - Mala Ilomska (right tributary below Petrovo Polje)
        - Manatovac (right tributary on Vlašić slopes)
      - Kobilja (right tributary below Imljani), downflow from mouth of Ilomska
      - Pljačkovac (right tributary nearby Vitovlje), Travnik
    - Vrbanja (right tributary in Banja Luka)
      - Bobovica (right tributary in Kruševo Brdo)
      - Bosanka (right tributary in Vrbanjci)
      - Crkvenica (right tributary in Šiprage)
      - Cvrcka (left tributary nearby Vrbanjci)
      - Čudnić (left tributary in Kruševo Brdo)
      - Ćorkovac (left tributary in Šiprage)
      - Demićka (left tributary in Šiprage)
      - Duboka (left tributary near Grabovica)
      - Grabovička rijeka (left tributary in Grabovica), Kotor Varoš
      - Jakotina (left tributary in Kotor Varoš)
      - Jezerka (right tributary nearby Vrbanjci)
      - Jošavka (right tributary in Čelinac)
      - Kruševica (right tributary in Obodnik)
      - Sadika (left tributary downflow from Šiprage)
      - Vigošća/Vigošta (right tributary in Obodnik)
    - Vrbaška (right tributary)
      - Crna rijeka (Vrbaška) (left tributary)

== Draining into the Adriatic Sea ==
- Neretva
  - Blučica (right tributary near Jablanica lake)
  - Bregava (left tributary near Stolac and Čapljina)
  - Trebižat (right tributary near Čapljina)
  - Buna (left tributary near Buna)
    - Bunica (left tributary)
  - Doljanka (right tributary in Jablanica)
  - Drežanka (right tributary)
  - Jezernica (right tributary)
  - Kraljuščica (right tributary)
  - Neretvica (right tributary near Konjic)

== Draining into lakes ==
- Mande, into Buško Lake

== Disappearing rivers ==
- Bijela (west side of Prenj mountain)
- Plovuča (in Livno field)
  - Bistrica (Livno) (in Livno field)
    - Sturba
  - Žabljak (in Livno field)
- Drina (Duvno field) (in Duvno field)
- Jaruga (in Livno field)
- Jaruga (in Glamoč field)
- Lištica (near Široki Brijeg)
- Milač (in Kupres field)
- Mrtvica (in Kupres field)
- Mušnica (in Gatačko field)
- Vrljika (in Imotski field)
  - Matica (left tributary)
- Trebišnjica
- Zalomka
- Šuica
