= Radohova =

Radohova Радохова
- Village
- Location in Bosnia and Herzegovina
- Coordinates: 44.4683°N 17.5319°E
- Country: Bosnia and Herzegovina
- Entity: Republika Srpska
- Municipality: Kotor Varoš
- Highest elevation: 820 m (2,690 ft)
- Lowest elevation: 600 m (2,000 ft)

Population (1991)
  - Total: 700
- Area code: +387 (051)

Radohova (Serbian Cyrillic: Радохова) is a settlement in the Kotor Varoš Municipality, Republika Srpska entity, Bosnia and Herzegovina. The settlement includes the hamlets of Ulice, Letići, Lapići, Traljići, Kerkezi, Gigovići, Demići, and Dunići, located on the slopes of Zastijenje, and extend from the Ulički stream to the source of Demićka (left tributary of the Vrbanja river) and the Djevojačka Ravan ("Girls' plain"). Its length is ca. 6 km.

== Geography ==
Radohova includes a number of hamlets on the Zastijenje slopes at altitudes of 640–850 m and belt about 10 km long. Local roads, all villages have access to regional road R-440: Šiprage – Kotor Varoš – Čelinac – Banja Luka.

== History ==
Above Dunići remains of stećci (tombstones) have been discovered.

During World War II, the Yugoslav Partisans were active in Radohova. A Partisan divisional hospital was located below Dunići rocks and Demići, in the gorge of Demićka river. It was repeatedly bombed during the Sixth Enemy Offensive.

During the Bosnian War (1992–95), Army of Republika Srpska (VRS), police and paramilitary forces demolished the surrounding Bosniak villages, especially those upstream along the Vrbanja to Kruševo Brdo, as well as all Bosniak villages downstream to Banja Luka.

== Population ==
Radohova; Census Year 2013: Total of 267 citizens
| Census Year | 1991. | 1981. | 1971. |
|---|---|---|---|
| Bosniaks | 644 (92,00%) | 625 (90,97%) | 680 (85,10%) |
| Serbs | 49 (7,00%) | 36 (5,24%) | 113 (14,14%) |
| Croats | 0 | 0 | 4 (0,50%) |
| Yugoslavs | 4 (0,57%) | 26 (3,78%) | 1 (0,12%) |
| Others and unknown | 3 (0,42%) | 0 | 1 (0,12%) |
| Total | 700 | 687 | 799 |
