= Stopan =

- Village
- Location in Bosnia and Herzegovina
- Coordinates: 44.4839°N 17.5636°E
- Country: Bosnia and Herzegovina
- Entity: Republika Srpska
- Municipality: Kotor Varoš
- Highest elevation: 680 m (2,230 ft)
- Lowest elevation: 660 m (2,170 ft)

Population (1991)
  - Total: 346

Stopan (Serbian Cyrillic: Стопан) is a village in the Bosnia and Herzegovina, Kotor Varoš Municipality, Šiprage local community. At the census in 1991, Stopan had a population of 346. According to preliminary results of the census 2013 there were 119 citizens.

== Geography ==
Stopan is located on the pass (altitude about 680 m) sandwiched between Crkvenica and Stopanski river, right tributaries of Vrbanja river. From this village to Šiprage there is a mostly gravel local road, length of about 8 km.

Stopan used to be a relatively big village in Šiprage's area, with drinking water, orchards, domestic fruit products, and hospitality.

== History ==
During World War II, the village took part in the defense forces and was a significant partisan jump refuge. In January 1944, it received a large number of wounded partisans, who were evacuated from the Divisional Hospital in the gorge of Demićka, near Šiprage, during the sixth enemy offensive. Because of the distance of the main local communications, Stopan was a safer refuge for the civilian inhabitants of surrounding localities.

During the War in Bosnia (1992–1995), army, police, and paramilitary forces of the Republika Srpska destroyed the surrounding Bosniak villages, especially those upstream of Vrbanja to Kruševo Brdo as well as those downstream to Banja Luka. Local inhabitants were being killed, and the majority were expelled. After 1996, most Bosniak villages in Šiprage community were partly restored, thanks to the BELUGA battalion of the EUFOR-SFOR Mission. The only mosque in the wide area was renewed.

== Population ==
Stopan
Census year	1991	1981	1971
Bosniaks	211 (60.98%)	177 (46.46%)	194 (47.67%)
Serbs	133 (38.44%)	174 (45.67%)	204 (50.12%)
Croats	1 (0.29%)	1 (0.26%)	1 (0.25)
Yugoslavians		29 (7.61)	
Slovenians			2 (0.49)
Other and unknown	1 (0.29%)		6 (1.47%)
Total	346	381	407
