= Bobovica (river) =

River in Bosnia and Herzegovina

Bobovica Kruševica
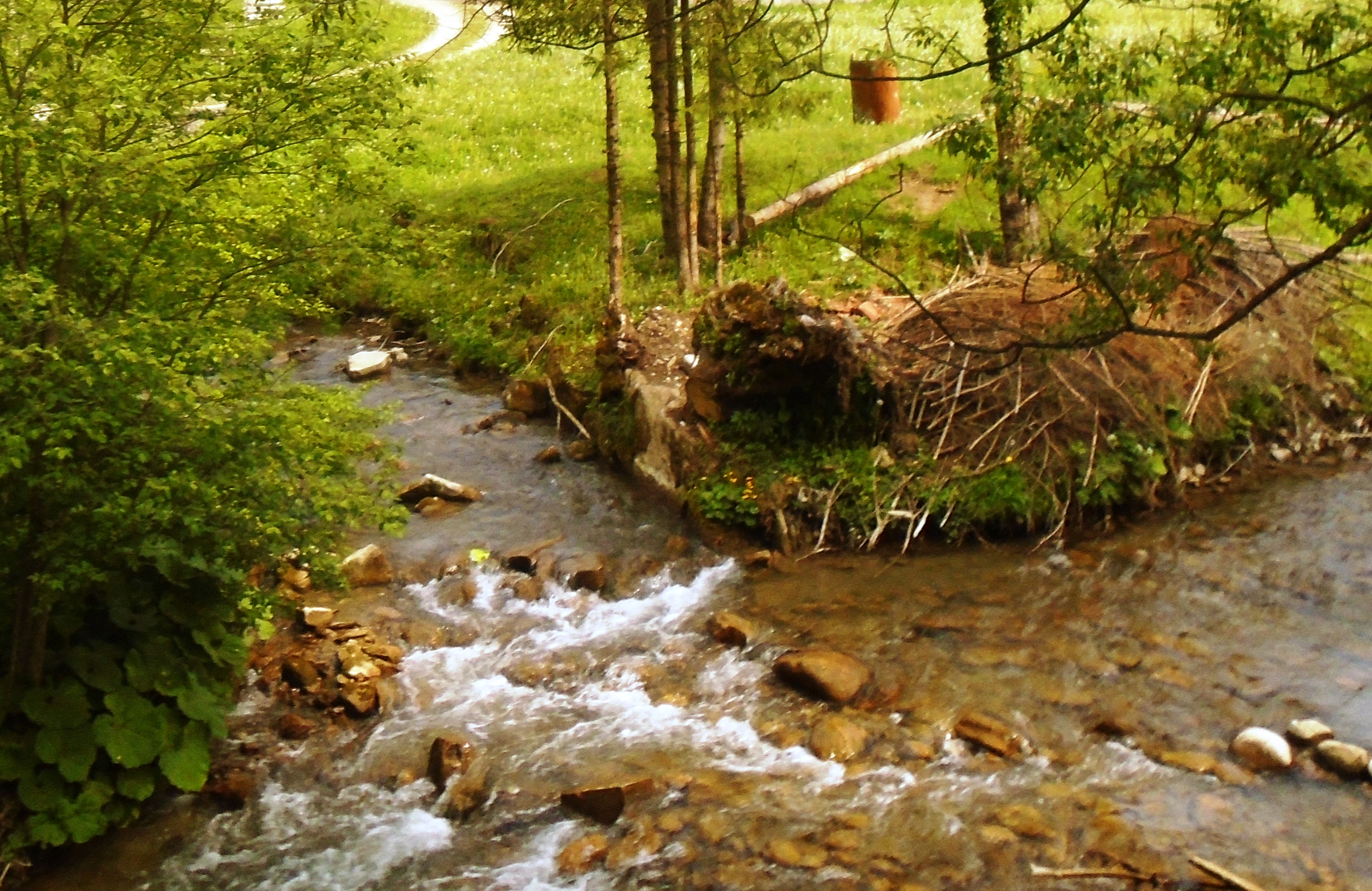
- Ušće Bobovice i rijeku Vrbanju

- Location within Bosnia and Herzegovina

Location
- Country: Bosnia and Herzegovina

Physical characteristics
- Source
  - location: Vlašić, Meokrnje
  - coordinates: 44.412541°N 17.685028°E
- Mouth
  - location: Vrbanja
  - coordinates: 44.415746°N 17.607934°E
- Length: 12 km (7.5 mi)

Basin features
- Progression: Vrbas→ Sava→ Danube→ Black Sea

The Bobovica (Serbian Cyrillic: Бобовица) is the richest tributary of upper flow of Vrbanja river, although it is marked on some maps as "Kruševica". However, the latter name is for another river about 30 kilometers downstream. Bobovica's length is around 12 km. Its mouth is in Kruševo Brdo. During the 1960s, there were about 15 mills on this river, the mouth of which is in Obodnik.

Bobovica arises (on 1,220 m) between north-western slopes of Meokrnje Mountain and south-eastern slopes of Očauš. The water source is on east acclivity of the Vijenac Hill (1,375 m), in the gorge which is exponed to Ciganska planina (Gipsy's Mountain), on the significant lower position compared with Vrbanja river. The canyon depth is around 380 m. It flows through the Bobovice village (769 m).

Above its water source there is the riverhead between Lašva river and Velika Usora (i.e. Bosna river) and Vrbanja river and Ugar (i.e. Vrbas). It is conducting the waters from numerous creeks and the strongest tributaries are (on right) Ljeskovac and Duboki and Novački potok (Deep and Novak's stream, on left)[2][3]. To its mouth in Kruševo Brdo, it is longer than Vrbanja river. It is (probably) reason for different estimations of Vrbanja's length (70-85,5 km).

== History ==
During the War in Bosnia (1992-1995), all of non-Serbs settlements in Vrbanja valley, from Bobovica's mouth to Banja Luka, were extremely devastated and local inhabitants (Bosniaks and Croats) killed and displaced. Many peoples were also on the list of missing persons.

== See also ==
- Vrbanja river
- Kruševo Brdo
- Šiprage
