= Trnovac (Vrbanja) =

- Location within Bosnia and Herzegovina
- Native name: Трновац (Bosnian)

Location
- Country: Bosnia and Herzegovina

Physical characteristics
- Source
  - location: Vlašić
  - elevation: 1,120 m (3,670 ft)
- Mouth
  - location: Vrbanja near Šiprage
  - coordinates: 44.455804°N 17.587156°E
- Length: 5 km (3.1 mi)

Basin features
- Progression: Vrbanja→ Vrbas→ Sava→ Danube→ Black Sea

The Trnovac (Трновац) is a river/stream in Central Bosnia, Bosnia and Herzegovina, one of many right tributaries of Vrbanja river.

Before the village Hajdarovići receives water of six right tributaries/springs, and in the case of two more left. In Vrbanja, it flows into the famous excursion site Trnovac, at an altitude of 546 m.

For most of its flow, the Trnovac runs to east - west, parallel to the upper stream Crkvenica and Lopača (also to the right tributaries of Vrbanja). It runs between Šipraško hill and the village of Kurušići (north) and Orahova ravan (plain) with the village of Gelići (south).

In the 1960s, there were 12 watermills in Trnovac, six with Hajdarovic and its estuaries.
