= Selačka, Kotor Varoš =

Selačka
- Village
- Location in Bosnia and Herzegovina
- Coordinates: 44.4661°N 17.6139°E
- Country: Bosnia and Herzegovina
- Entity: Republika Srpska
- Municipality: Kotor Varoš
- Highest elevation: 850 m (2,790 ft)
- Lowest elevation: 680 m (2,230 ft)

Population (1991)
  - Total: 303
- Time zone: Central European
- Postal code: (+387) 51

Selačka (Serbian Cyrillic: Селачка) is a village in the Kotor Varoš municipality in central Bosnia and Herzegovina. There are 41 inhabitants (2013 census).

== Geography ==
The name Selačka is used in a wider geographical sense for the north-eastern slopes of Šipraško Brdo which includes a few hamlets and settlements, of which the largest are Kerle, Grič, Selačka, Hajdarovići, Kurušići, and Gelići. Selačka, elevated between 680–850 m, is situated above the two tributaries of Vrbanja river, Trnovac and Crkvenica.

The local roads are connected to the regional road R-440: Kruševo Brdo–Šiprage–Obodnik–Kotor Varoš–Banja Luka.

== History ==
During World War II, the Yugoslav Partisans were active in the Šiprage area, especially during the Sixth Enemy Offensive (1943–44).

Selačka was not listed as a settlement in the 1961, 1971 and 1981 censuses. According to the 1991 census, the village was ethnically mixed, inhabited by Muslims (now known as Bosniaks) and Serbs.

During the Bosnian War (1992–95), JNA and Serb paramilitary dispersed the Bosniaks from Selačka. The village is now described as Serb-inhabited.

In 2008, 70 sheep were euthanised due to widespread illness in the municipality. In 2011 the village was a site of bear attacks on sheep.

== Population ==
In 2009, the village was described as Serb-inhabited. In 2011, it was estimated that there were 10 inhabitants in the village. The village was part of the local community (mjesna zajednica) of Šiprage. According to the 2013 preliminary census, there were 41 inhabitants.

Demographic history
| Ethnic group | 1991 | 2013 |
|---|---|---|
| Bosniaks | N/A | |
| Serbs | 137 (45.21%) | |
| Muslims | 163 (53.80%) | |
| Yugoslavs | 3 (0.99%) | |
| Others | | |
| Total | 303 | 41 |

== Sources ==
- "ПРОСТОРНИ ПЛАН ОПШТИНЕ КОТОР ВАРОШ 2009-2030" (PDF). "IG" Banja Luka, Opština Kotor Varoš. February 2014.
