= Crna Reka =

Crna Reka or Crna Rijeka (Macedonian and Serbo-Croatian for "Black River"), or Crna River may refer to:

== Villages ==
=== Bosnia and Herzegovina ===
- Crna Rijeka (Novi Grad), a village in municipality of Novi Grad, Republika Srpska

=== Serbia ===
- Crna Reka (Trgovište), a village in municipality of Trgovište

== Rivers ==
=== Bosnia and Herzegovina ===
- Crna River (Sava), tributary of Sava
- Crna River (Vrbas), tributary of Vrbas
- Crna River (Vrbanja), tributary of Vrbanja
- Crna River (Ilomska), tributary of Ilomska
- Crna River (Lepenica), tributary of Lepenica
- Crna River (Željeznica), tributary of Željeznica

=== North Macedonia ===
- Crna River (Vardar), tributary of Vardar

=== Serbia ===
- Crna Reka (region)
- Crna River (Ibar), tributary of Ibar
- Crna River or Crni Timok

== Other ==
- Crna Reka Monastery, a monastery in Serbia

== See also ==
- Black River (disambiguation)
