= Vigošća =

- Location within Bosnia and Herzegovina

Location
- Country: Bosnia and Herzegovina

Physical characteristics
- Mouth
  - location: Vrbanja
  - coordinates: 44.5636°N 17.4713°E

Basin features
- Progression: Vrbanja→ Vrbas→ Sava→ Danube→ Black Sea

Vigošća (also: Vigošta) is a left tributary of the Vrbanja river in Bosnia and Herzegovina. It rises on the northern slopes of Ježica mountain by strong spring Vrelo (English: Spring, 1,070 m above sea level), on the north slopes of Ježica mountain.

The source stream of this river is Stubanski potok (stream), which is below the village of Upper Orahova already at 672 m above sea level. In the immediate area of the village accepts water several smaller streams and gets its name (Vigošća), which is the geographical maps often marked as Vigosta. Thence it flows into the canyon, which is between the paths (in the northwest) and Ljeskovac (southeast, depth of about 400 m). Formerly (until the 1960s) to Vigošća was even 20 mills. In 1992 they were totally devastated. In Vrbanja river the Vigošća awe at the main road M-4 Banja Luka - Teslic - Matuzići (where it joined the magistral road M-17), with exit to Šiprage (in Obodnik). Estuary is at the same named hamlet (Vigošća), village of Donja Orahova (340 m above sea level).

During the War in Bosnia (1992-1995) all Croatian villages along Vigošću were destroyed, especially Upper and Lower Orahova. The same fate befell all the other Bosniaks and Croats villages in the valley of Vrbanja, from Kruševo Brdo to Banja Luka. Local residents were murdered or expelled.
