= Crna River (Vrbanja) =

- Location within Bosnia and Herzegovina
- Native name: Црна ријека (Bosnian)

Location
- Country: Bosnia and Herzegovina

Physical characteristics
- Source
  - location: Slopes of Uzlomac
  - elevation: 450 m (1,480 ft)
- Mouth
  - location: Crna Rijeka on Vrbanja River
  - coordinates: 44°41′05″N 17°20′59″E
- Length: 5 km (3.1 mi)

Basin features
- Progression: Vrbanja→ Vrbas→ Sava→ Danube→ Black Sea

Crna River (Bosnian: Crna rijeka / Црна ријека, "Black River") is one of the right-hand tributaries of the Vrbanja River in Bosnia and Herzegovina. It rises on the western slopes of Uzlomac (at about 450 m).

The only significant tributary of Crna River is Dugi Creek (Dugi potok / Дуги поток, "Long Creek"), which is longer than itself. Its mouth is at the town of the same name, Crna River, on the M4 road (Banja Luka – Kotor Varoš – Matuzići – Doboj). Its lower course is the border between Čelinac and Kotor Varoš municipalities.
