= Meokrnje =

Mountain in Bosnia and Herzegovina, Balkan

- Location within Bosnia and Herzegovina

Highest point
- Elevation: 1,425 m (4,675 ft)
- Coordinates: 44°22′47″N 17°42′33″E

Geography
- Location: Bosnia and Herzegovina
- Parent range: Dinaric Alps

Meokrnje (1,425 m) is a mountain in Central Bosnia (Bosnia and Herzegovina, in the masiff chain of internal Dinaris mountains. This is the greatest elevation between Vlašić (1933 m) (the southwest) and Manjača (1358 m) - the northeast.

The nearest populated places are Jeezera and Željezno Polje (Iron Field) (east), i.e. Šiprage and Korićani (west).

On the slopes of Meokrnja there is the watershed ("Prelivode") between the basins of Bosnia (east), Bila (south), Ugar and Ilomska (west - southwest) and Vrbanja river (northwest).

The mountain is rich in mixed and coniferous forests, especially its southwestern slopes (along to Ilomska and Ugar). Its ridge leads unregulated communications Gluha Bukovica - Kruševo Brdo - Šiprage.

== See also ==
- Šiprage
- Vrbanja river
- Bila (river)
- Ilomska
