= Bila (river) =

Bila Била
- Location within Bosnia and Herzegovina

Location
- Country: Bosnia and Herzegovina

Physical characteristics
- Source
  - location: Vlašić
  - coordinates: 44°24′17″N 17°41′37″E
  - elevation: 1320 m
- Mouth
  - location: Lašva
  - coordinates: 44°10′06″N 17°45′31″E
- Length: 35 km (22 mi)

Basin features
- Progression: Lašva→ Bosna→ Sava→ Danube→ Black Sea
- River system: Bosna
- Tributaries
  - left: Pržni and Javorački potok, Ramića Rijeka, Jasenica, and Rogačka Rijeka
  - right: Suhi potok, Butetinac, Pašinac, Ribnjak, Trimuža and Kozica

The Bila river is the largest tributary of the Lašva river. The Bila river flows past the settlements of Stara Bila and Nova Bila (transl. Old and New Bila), with a length of approximately 35 km. Originating from Vlašić mountain, in the area of Prelivode and Meupić mountain, it flows south to south-east toward Lašva valley where it spills into the Lašva river.

The aquifer form which the source of the Bila emerges is shared with the Vrbanja, Ilomska, and Ugar rivers of the Vrbas basin in the west, and the Bosna basin in the east, via rivers of the Usora and Lašva. This watershed is situated in the areal of mountains Meupić, Vučija Planina (transl. Wolf's Mountain), Usko Brdo (transl. Narrow Hill), Vijenac, Jasen and Divić, at approximately 1,300 to 1350 meters above sea level. On its way to the Lašva, the Bila runs through a valley between the Vlašić (1943 m) and Meokrnje (1,425 m) mountains, which is approximately 2.5 km wide near the confluence with the Lašva, passing through the villages of Bukovica and Mehurići. The river often floods the valley and has significant hydro potential.

The river Bila is rich in water as it drains from numerous small mountain rivers and streams, such as, on the right: the Suhi potok, Butetinac, Pašinac, Ribnjak, Trimuža and Kozica, and on the left: the Pržni and Javorački potok, Ramića Rijeka, Jasenica, and Rogačka Rijeka.

== See also ==
- Travnik
- Vitez
