= Kozica (surname) =

Kozica is a surname. Notable people with the surname include:

- Edin Kozica (born 1986) Bosnian footballer
- Dženis Kozica (born 1993), Swedish footballer
- Kazimierz Kozica (1892–1969), Polish historian of cartography

== See also ==
- Kozica (disambiguation)
