= Jezerka =

- Location within Bosnia and Herzegovina

Location
- Country: Bosnia and Herzegovina

Physical characteristics
- Mouth
  - location: Vrbanja
  - coordinates: 44.580261°N 17.449589°E

Basin features
- Progression: Vrbanja→ Vrbas→ Sava→ Danube→ Black Sea

Jezerka is an eastern tributary (class H - Hydrographic, freshwater stream) of Europe's Vrbanja River. It flows from the western slopes of the Uzlomac, beginning at 900 meters above sea level, south of the villages of Grabik and Jankovine. The river delta is several kilometers upstream from Vrbanjci, along the main motorway M-4 (Banja Luka – Doboj).

The largest tributaries of the Jezerka are Žilića and Dubočaj, with Pirizevac (to the east). Seven mills were built on the Jezerka in the late 1950s.

On the plateau of its upper flow, crossroads lead to the village of Gornji Obodnik and to the M-4 motorway. On the northeast slopes of Uzlomac (1,002 meters), a mountain pass separates the confluences of the Vrbanja river and the Ukrina (the Božića stream and confluence of Bistrica).

During the War in Bosnia, inhabitants along the mouth of the river were expelled and murdered. This was especially true for the villages of Vrbanjci, Večići, Hrvaćani, Garići, and Rujevica.

== Location ==
The Jezerka runs through the Republika Srpska and Bosnia and Herzegovina in Southeastern Europe, with an average elevation of 336 meters. Its UTM position is XK93 and its Joint Operation Graphics reference is NL33-12.

== See also ==
- Vrbanjci
- Večići
- Kotor Varoš
