= Kozica =

Kozica may refer to the following places:

- Kozica, Vrgorac, a village in the town of Vrgorac, Croatia
- Kozica, Pljevlja, a village in the municipality of Pljevlja, Montenegro
- Kozica (Fojnica), a village in the municipality of Fojnica, Bosnia and Herzegovina
- Kozica (surname), surname
