= Sadika =

Location
- Country: Bosnia and Herzegovina

Physical characteristics
- Source
  - location: NE slopes of Zastinje Mountain
  - elevation: 1,000 m (3,300 ft)
- Mouth
  - location: Vrbanja
  - coordinates: 44.4735°N 17.5466°E
  - elevation: 496 m (1,627 ft)

Basin features
- Progression: Vrbanja→ Vrbas→ Sava→ Danube→ Black Sea

Sadika is a tributary of the river Vrbanja in Bosnia and Herzegovina. It rises on the northeastern slopes of Zastinje Mountain, at 1,000 metres (3,300 ft) above sea level. The Sadika's confluence with the Vrbanja–which is the largest right tributary of the Vrbas–is below Gigovići, a village close to the Kotor Varoš-Šiprage road, at 496 metres (1,627 ft) above sea level.

== See also ==
- Demićka
