= Usora =

Usora may refer to the:

- Usora (river), in central-northern Bosnia and Herzegovina
- Usora Municipality, in modern Bosnia and Herzegovina
- Usora (region), a historic region in ancient Bosnia
