= Doboj South =

Village and municipality in Bosnia and Herzegovina

Coordinates: 44°41′16″N 18°03′06″E

Doboj South Doboj Jug Добој Југ
- Village and municipality
- Coat of arms

- Location of Doboj South within Bosnia and Herzegovina.
- Country: Bosnia and Herzegovina
- Entity: Federation of Bosnia and Herzegovina
- Canton: Zenica-Doboj

Government
  - Municipal mayor: Mirnes Tukić (SDA)

Area
  - Total: 102 km^{2} (39 sq mi)

Population (2013)
  - Total: 4,137
  - Density: 432/km^{2} (1,120/sq mi)
- Time zone: UTC+1 (CET)
  - Summer (DST): UTC+2 (CEST)
- Area code: +387 32
- Website: www.dobojjug.ba

Doboj South (Serbian Cyrillic: Добој Југ) is a municipality in the Zenica-Doboj Canton of the Federation of Bosnia and Herzegovina, Bosnia and Herzegovina. It borders the municipality of Doboj. The seat of the municipality is the village of Matuzići.

== About Doboj South ==
The municipality if Doboj South is a newly formed municipality, established as a direct consequence of war activities in this area. It is not a very large municipality, covering an area of only 10 square kilometers. It is located at the crossroads of the M-4 and M-17 roads, and at the confluence of the Usora river and the Bosna river.

== Demographics ==
=== Settlements ===
The municipality consists of the villages of Matuzići and Mravići.

=== Population ===
Population of settlements – Doboj South municipality
	Settlement	1991.	2013.
	Total	3,259	4,409
1	Matuzići	1,783	2,591
2	Mravići	1,476	1,546

=== Ethnic composition ===
Ethnic composition – Doboj South municipality
	2013.	1991.
Total	4,409 (100,0%)	3,259 (100,0%)
Bosniaks	4,047 (97,82%)	3,045 (93,43%)
Roma	26 (0,628%)	
Croats	24 (0,580%)	97 (2,976%)
Unaffiliated	14 (0,338%)	
Serbs	9 (0,218%)	19 (0,583%)
Others	7 (0,169%)	39 (1,197%)
Unknown	6 (0,145%)	
Albanians	4 (0,097%)	
Yugoslavs		

Ethnic composition (1991.) – the Doboj South municipality by settlements
	Settlement	Total	Bosniaks	Serbs	Croats	Others	
1	Matuzići	1,783	1,698	18	10	39	18
2	Mravići	1,476	1,347	1	87	20	21

== Sports ==
The local football club, NK Gradina Doboj-Jug, plays in the Regional League of the Federation of Bosnia and Herzegovina.
