= Vrbanja (Banja Luka) =

Suburban village in Banja Luka, Bosnia and Herzegovina

Coordinates: 44.763°N 17.249°E

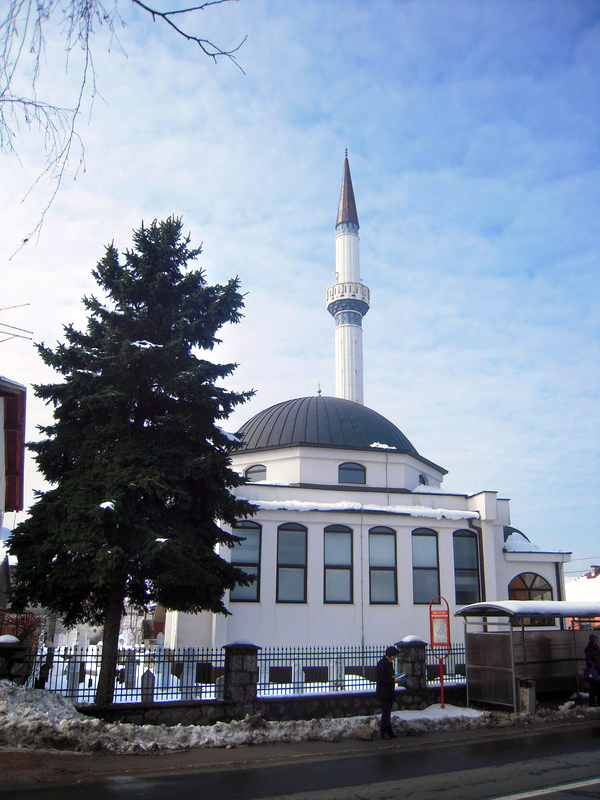
Renewed Vrbanja mosque The first mosque to be destroyed entirely was Farhad Pasha mosque (Ferhadija mosque) in Banja Luka The minaret and parts of the wall were preserved.

Vrbanja is a suburban village and local community in Banja Luka, Republika Srpska, Bosnia and Herzegovina, about 6 kilometres (3.7 mi) south-east of the city's center. Until 1971, it was officially a separate inhabited place. Then it came to be the part of the settlement of Banja Luka – today the City of Banja Luka.

Through Vrbanja passes the Vrbanja River (after which the settlement was named) and two major lines of communication: the Banja Luka – Doboj railway line and the M4 highway (Banja Luka – Kotor Varoš – Doboj).

In addition to the eponymous Vrbanja River, the natural resources of the settlement include the numerous natural springs of drinking water that are found in the surrounding hills.

== History ==
After the history of Medieval Bosnia and the earlier period, it can be concluded that in this area, there was a very old village. It was located about 500 meters north of the present-day village. The tradition which has been preserved among today's population suggest that the former settlement was organized on the principle of rural cooperatives.

The main activity of the Vrbanja's population in the past was agriculture. Since the mid-twentieth century, many residents were employed in the Banja Luka industry, but agriculture remained the main activity.

During the 1990s, the local (mostly Bosniaks) population has suffered the fate of all Bosniak villages in the Vrbanja valley, from Kruševo Brdo (Krusevo Hill) to Banja Luka. The inhabitants were killed and expelled, the estates occupied local and newcoming Serbs. However, the return of Bosniaks in Vrbanja is one of the most successful projects of repatriation in Bosanska Krajina.

== See also ==
- Vrbanja river
- Banja Luka
