= Grabovica, Kotor Varoš =

Settlement in Republika Srpska, Bosnia and Herzegovina

Coordinates: 44.5000°N 17.5000°E

Grabovica is a settlement in the Kotor Varoš Municipality, Republika Srpska, Bosnia and Herzegovina. It is located by the Vrbanja river, the new village on the mouth on Grabovička rijeka, and old one at around 3 km upstream of this Vrbanja's tributary. Grabovica is situated at an altitude of about 450 m, and the distance from Kotor Varos is about 23 km.

It is believed that during the Bosnian War (1992–95) around 161 Bosniaks held captive at the Grabovica elementary school by the Army of the Republika Srpska were killed (their graves undiscovered).

== Population ==
Grabovica
Census Year	1991	1981	1971
Serbs	870 (98.08%)	1,065 (99.34%)	1,202 (98.84%)
Bosniaks	0	0	1 (0,08%)
Croats	0	1 (0.09%)	1 (0.08%)
Yugoslavians	1 (0.11%)	3 (0.27%)	1 (0.08%)
Others and unknown	16 (1.80%)	3 (0.27%)	11 (0.90%)
Total	887	1,072	1,216
