= Ćorkovac =

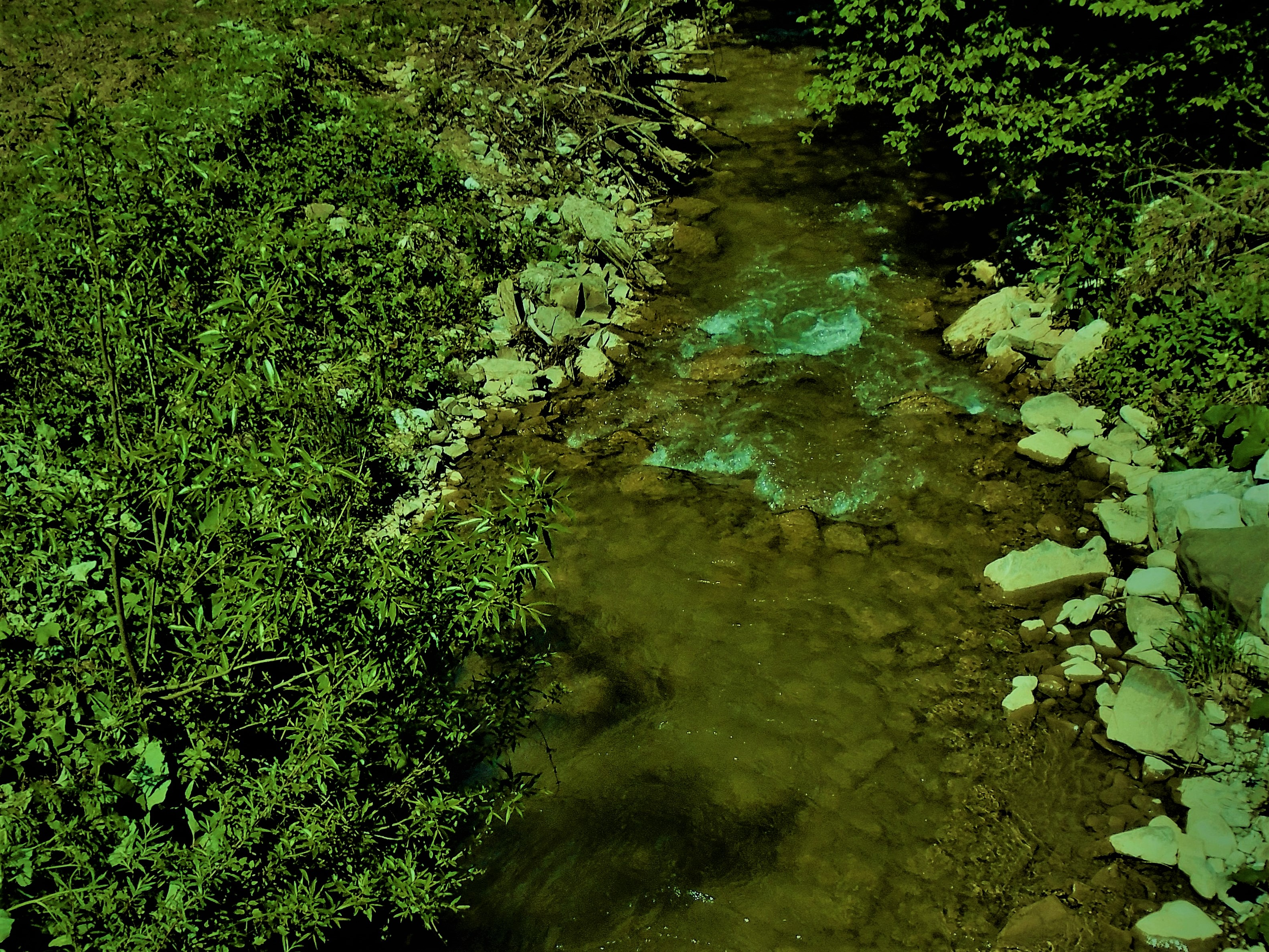
- Ćorkovac under the Bašinice bridge

- Location within Bosnia and Herzegovina
- Native name: Ћорковац (Serbian)

Location
- Country: Bosnia and Herzegovina

Physical characteristics
- Source
  - location: Vlašić slopes
- Mouth
  - location: Vrbanja
  - coordinates: 44.4663°N 17.5742°E
- Length: 6 km (3.7 mi)

Basin features
- Progression: Vrbanja→ Vrbas→ Sava→ Danube→ Black Sea

The Ćorkovac (Serbian Cyrillic: Ћорковац) is an eastern confluent of the Vrbanja river in Bosnia. It begins on the north-eastern slopes of the Vlašić mountain's plateau, and the mouth opens at Šiprage, where the town's sawmill was. The spring of Ćorkovac is 1,150 metres above sea level, and is around 6 kilometres long. It flows between the Jasen and Stražbenica mountains to its estuary. The watermills were in operation until the 1960s.

In the relatively narrow area there is a fertile and wide riverhead between Ćorkovac, Ilomska, Čudnić, Kovačevići's stream, Grabovička rijeka, Kobilja, Ugrić and other confluents of Vrbanja and the Ugar river.

The crest of the riverhead directs towards the villages of Petrovo Polje, Imljani, Vlatkovići, and the Skender Vakuf Municipality.

Nearby, below the ridge there are springs from an unnamed eastern confluent of Ćorkovac and (on right) Zuhrići's stream (Slatki potok = Sweet stream). Across the stream there were Zuhrići and Vrbovo villages, which were destroyed during the spring of 1992. Local inhabitants were killed and displaced, as well as all Bosniaks and Croats settlements at the mouth of Vrbanja river (Vrbas). After the 1996, the destroyed villages in Šiprage's region are reconstructed by Battalion BELUGA (Belgium – Luxembourg – Greece – Austria), from IFOR/SFOR Mission.
