= Duboka (Vrbanja) =

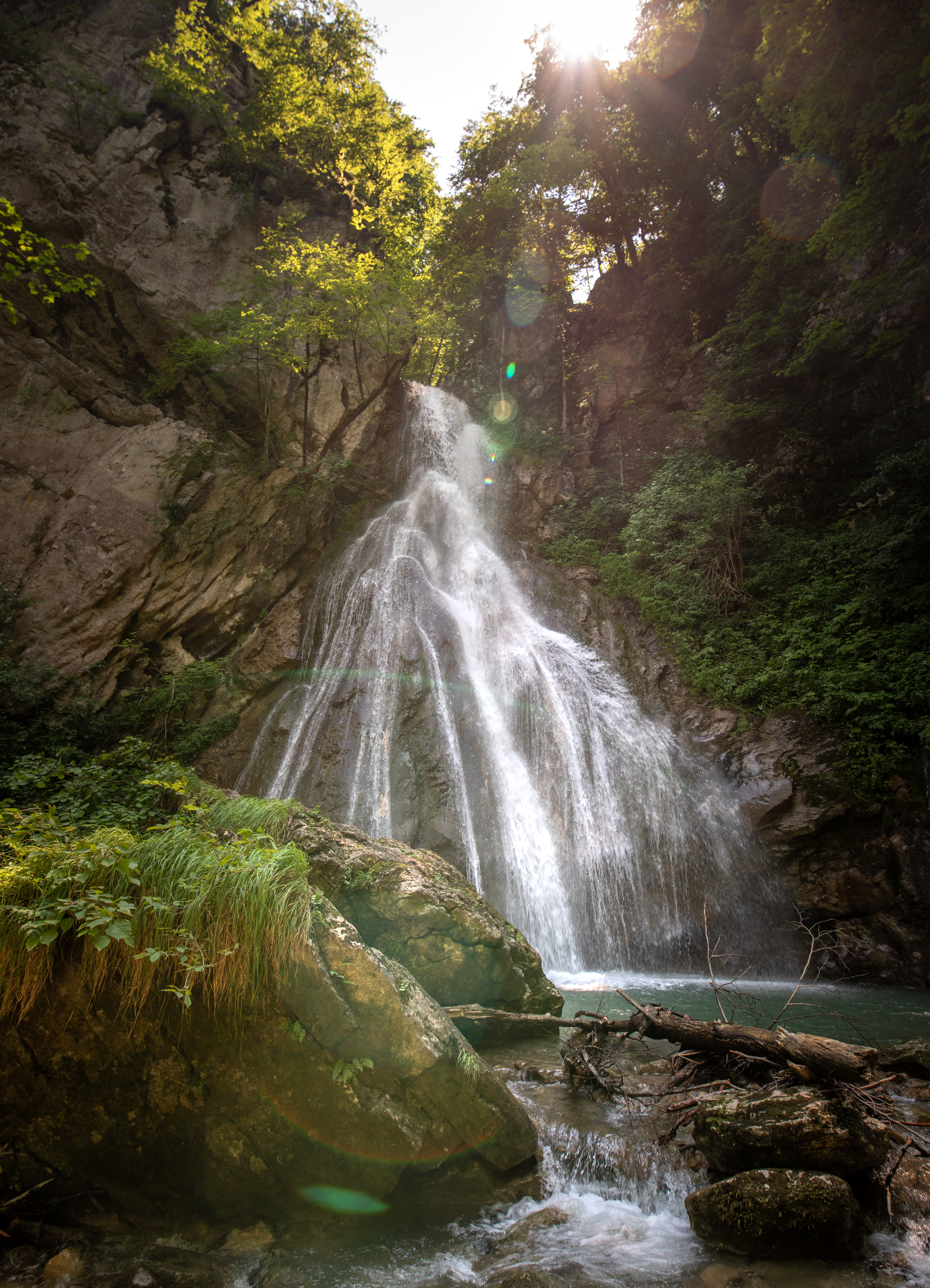
- Waterfall "Skakavac"

- Location within Bosnia and Herzegovina
- Native name: Дубoкa (Serbian)

Location
- Country: Bosnia and Herzegovina

Physical characteristics
- Source
  - location: Međugorje Mountain
  - coordinates: 44.481657°N 17.410814°E
  - elevation: 1,030 m (3,380 ft)
- Mouth
  - location: Vrbanja
  - coordinates: 44.517987°N 17.495563°E
- Length: 8 km (5.0 mi)

Basin features
- Progression: Vrbanja→ Vrbas→ Sava→ Danube→ Black Sea

The Duboka (Дубoкa, "Deep river") is a left tributary of the Vrbanja in Bosnia. It rises under Međugorje Mountain (1,116 m), and Bojići village (Skender Vakuf), around 1,030 meters above sea level. It grows strong after large Gladno vrelo ("Hungry spring"). To its mouth, the Duboka receives an abundance of streams, brooks and coastal streams (on both of the river banks).

Cord area around Međugorje (Ravna gora, Ravna planina, Paljike, Paunica and Borak) is extraordinary rich with drinking water streams flowing all over the area.

Between Mekote and Gradine localities, Duboka enters into deep canyon, from which originated its name, as well as the village through which flows. Its length is around 8 km. In 1960 there were 5 water-mills on this river.

At the beginning of the canyon, the water level is 941 meters above sea level, and below Ježica Mountain (1276 m), i.e. under the cliff so called Stijena (Rock, 1,200 m) canyon's depth over 560 metres. The mouth to Vrbanja river is on its large curve between Grabovička rijeka and Tovarnica highland, on 430 meters above sea level.

Two waterfalls are located on the river, Lower Skakavac (Duboka) and Upper Skakavac.

During the War in Bosnia, in the canyon of Duboka, around 200 Bosniaks were captured and transported to Elementary Scholl in Grabovica (mouth of Grabovička rijeka) and still remain missing today.
