= Crna River (Vrbas) =

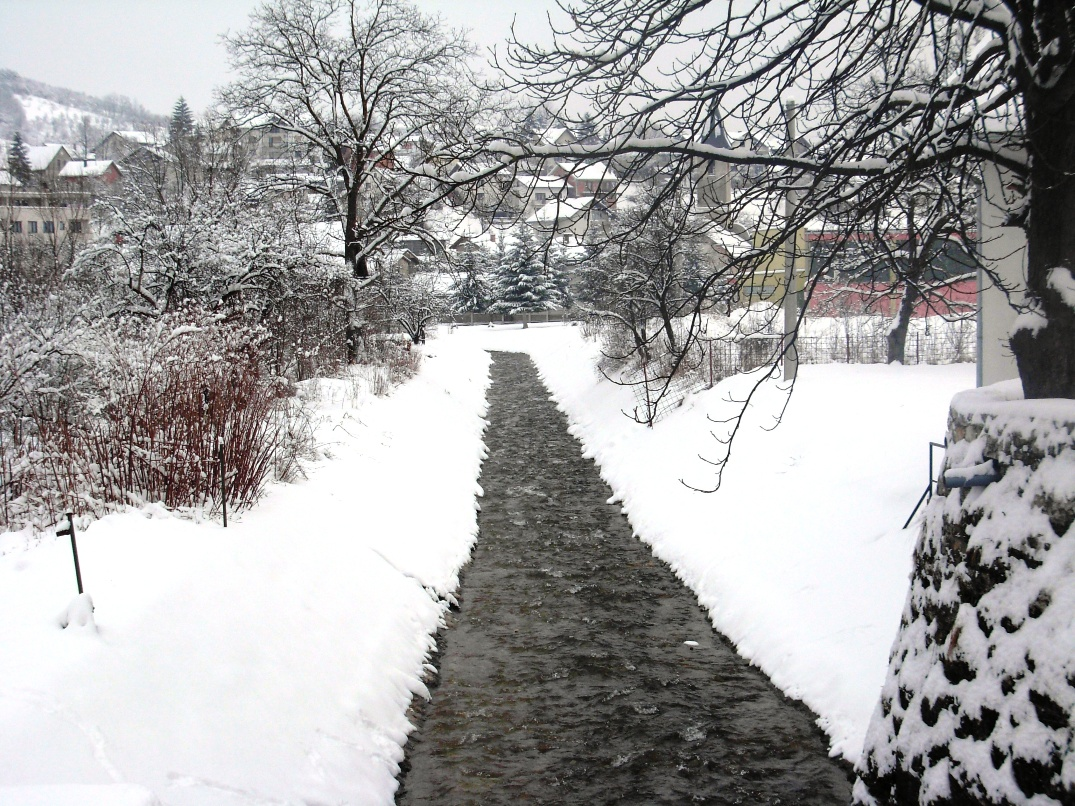
- Crna rijeka in Mrkonjić Grad

- Location within Bosnia and Herzegovina
- Native name: Црна ријека (Bosnian)

Location
- Country: Bosnia and Herzegovina

Physical characteristics
- Source
  - location: Malo Lake (Balkana), Lisina slopes
  - elevation: 780 m (2,560 ft)
- Mouth
  - location: Vrbas
  - coordinates: 44°27′59″N 17°10′44″E
- Length: 17 km (11 mi)

Basin features
- Progression: Vrbas→ Sava→ Danube→ Black Sea

Crna River (Bosnian: Crna rijeka / Црна ријека, "Black River") is left tributary of Vrbas. It arises from Malo Lake (Malo jezero, "Little Lake", 780 m) of Balkana, Mrkonjić Grad Municipality. The lake fed by streams Cjepalo (1320 m) and Skakavac with mountain Lisina, as well as sublacustric sources under the Veliko Lake (Veliko jezero, "Great Lake").

The river flows in the direction south-north and on the way runs through the town, and after a flow of 17 km flows into the Vrbas (at places Dabrac). It used to be known for numerous fish species and developed the sport fishing.
