= Demićka =

- Location within Bosnia and Herzegovina
- Etymology: Named after Demići village

Location
- Country: Bosnia and Herzegovina

Physical characteristics
- Source
  - location: Djevojaka Ravan - Dunići
  - elevation: 1,050 m (3,440 ft)
- Mouth
  - location: Vrbanja river, in Šiprage
  - coordinates: 44.464408°N 17.554760°E
  - elevation: 510 m (1,670 ft)
- Length: 10 km (6.2 mi)

Basin features
- Progression: Vrbanja→ Vrbas→ Sava→ Danube→ Black Sea
- Tributaries
  - left: Demićki potok
  - right: Djevojački potok, Svinjčijski potok, Smrički potok, and Brestovača

Demićka is a river that flows through Bosnia. It is the largest left bank tributary of the Vrbanja river.

The Demićka rises above the Dunići village at around 1,050 meters above sea level, on the southern slopes of Zāstinje (Backstones, 1,230 m), in Vlašić massif. The river's length is around 10 km.

The Demićka streams northwest through Dèmići village between the Radohova and Stražbenica mountains. The river mouth is in Šiprage. Downstream of its source, the Demićka enters a short canyon below Dunići village, known as Dunića stijene (Dunići's Rocks), followed by a funnel-shaped area near its estuary. Below Dunići, the river enters a vertical ravine with a depth of 400 meters.

In spring Vrbanja's tributaries (Ćorkovac, Sadika, Duboka and Ugar's confluence of Kobilja and other streams) flow. The main tributaries of Demićka are Grozničavica, Djevojački potok and Brestovača.
