= Kravica (river) =

River in Bosnia and Herzegovina

- Location within Bosnia and Herzegovina

Location
- Country: Bosnia and Herzegovina
- Entity: Republic of Srpska
- Municipilaty: Bratunac

Physical characteristics
- Source
  - location: Konjevići
- Mouth: Jadar
  - location: Ježeštica
  - coordinates: 44°14′41″N 19°06′38″E

The Kravica (Note: Serbian Cyrillic: Кравица) is a short river in Bratunac, Republic of Srpska, Bosnia and Herzegovina. It is located in the Drina basin. The river starts in the Konjevići and flows into the Jadar river, a tributary of Drinjača, in Ježeštica.

== History ==
During the 2014 Southeast Europe floods, some of the bridges on the river had collapsed under a torrent of water.

== See also ==
- List of rivers of Bosnia and Herzegovina
