= Mravići =

- Village
- Location within Bosnia and Herzegovina
- Coordinates: 44°40′26″N 18°03′06″E
- Country: Bosnia and Herzegovina
- Entity: Federation of Bosnia and Herzegovina
- Canton: Zenica-Doboj
- Municipality: Doboj South

Area
  - Total: 2.37 sq mi (6.14 km^{2})

Population (2013)
  - Total: 1,546
  - Density: 652/sq mi (252/km^{2})
- Time zone: UTC+1 (CET)
  - Summer (DST): UTC+2 (CEST)

Mravići is a village in the municipality of Doboj South, Bosnia and Herzegovina.

== Demographics ==
According to the 2013 census, its population was 1,546.

Ethnicity in 2013
Ethnicity	Number	Percentage
Bosniaks	1,504	97.3%
Serbs	20	1.3%
Croats	3	0.2%
other/undeclared	19	1.2%
Total	1,546	100%
