= Čudnić =

Čudnić Чуднић
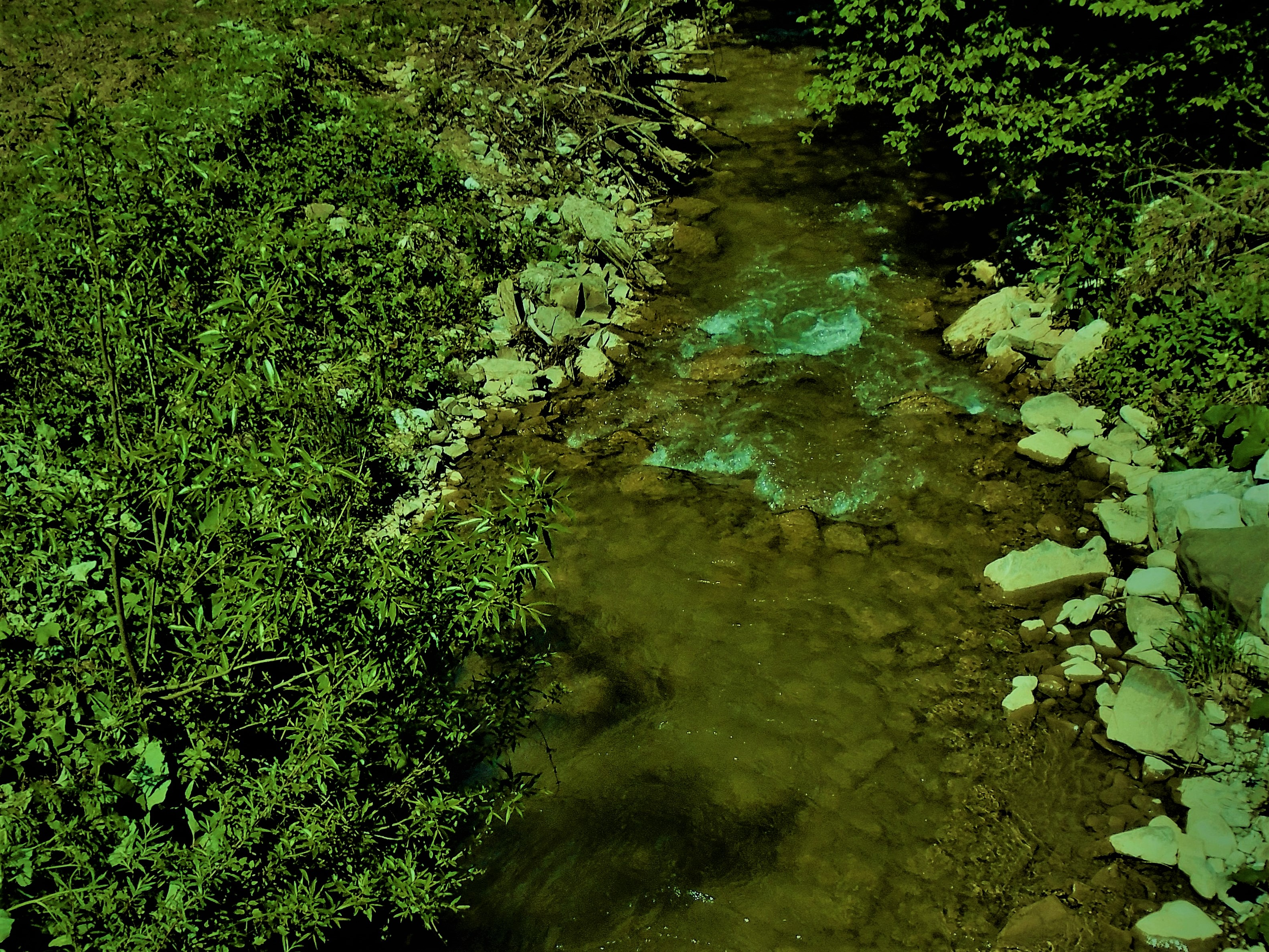

- Location within Bosnia and Herzegovina

Location
- Country: Bosnia and Herzegovina

Physical characteristics
- Source
  - location: Vlašić slopes
  - coordinates: 44.410503°N 17.556435°E
- Mouth
  - location: Vrbanja
  - coordinates: 44.418114°N 17.600799°E
- Length: 6 km (3.7 mi)

Basin features
- Progression: Vrbanja→ Vrbas→ Sava→ Danube→ Black Sea

The Čudnić (Serbian Cyrillic: Чуднић) is a left, western tributary of the Vrbanja in Bosnia and Herzegovina. It flows to Panići village and empties into the village of Čudić in the village of Kruševo Brdo, below Arapov Brijeg (Arab's hill). It springs on the southeastern slopes of the lower Vlašić's plateau, below the Ilomska and its tributaries. The spring is on a riverhead with the Kovačevića creek and the Ćorkovac creek. The tributary flows deep and fast; it is the local population's belief that the Čudnić is flowing over a part of the water of the Ilomska confluence.

In World War II, during Operation Kugelblitz, or the '6th Enemy Offensive', of 1943 to 1944, partisans established the 12th Division's hospital near Šiprage. After consistent bombings of the neighboring Šiprage, about 600 injured and sick partisans were temporarily displaced to Čudnić village and other surrounding settlements on January 4, 1944. After the departure of German and Chetnik units, this "mobile hospital" quickly returned to Šiprage (January 15, 1944).

After the war, the remains of dead partisans were moved from temporary graves in the forest to a Memorial Partisan Cemetery in Šiprage near Zagradine.

During the War in Bosnia (1992–1995), all the Bosniaks villages around Čudnić were destroyed, and their civilian inhabitants killed and displaced, as well as those from all the Bosniak and Croat villages to the Vrbanja's mouth (in Vrbas).

== See also ==
- Kotor Varoš
