= Željezno Polje =

- Village
- Location within Bosnia and Herzegovina
- Coordinates: 44.41°N 17.93°E
- Country: Bosnia and Herzegovina
- Entity: Federation of Bosnia and Herzegovina
- Canton: Zenica-Doboj
- Municipality: Žepče

Area
  - Total: 15.78 sq mi (40.88 km^{2})

Population (2013)
  - Total: 4,791
  - Density: 303.5/sq mi (117.2/km^{2})
- Time zone: UTC+1 (CET)
  - Summer (DST): UTC+2 (CEST)

Željezno Polje is a village in Žepče Municipality, Federacija Bosne i Hercegovine, Bosnia and Herzegovina.

According to the 2013 census, its population was 4,791.

In 2014 there have been huge floods that destroyed about 100 houses. It were Evacuated about 2,000 residents. Many houses are still (January, 2017) not restored.

== Population ==
Željezno Polje Total population in 2013: 4,845
Census Year	1991	1981	1971
Bosniaks	3.947 (90.03%)	3.430 (88.47%)	2.636 (87.95%)
Croats	386 (8.80%)	392 (10.11%)	341 (11.37%)
Serbs	19 (0.43%)	28 (0.72%)	11 (0.36%)
Yugoslavs	20 (0.45%)	14 (0.36%)	3 (0.10%)
Others and unknown	12 (0.27%)	13 (0.33%)	6 (0.20%)
Total	4,384	3,877	2,997

== See also ==
- Žepče
- Meokrnje
