= Pavlovići =

Pavlovići Павловићи
- Village
- Location within Bosnia and Herzegovina
- Coordinates: 44.382026°N 17.404525°E
- Country: Bosnia and Herzegovina
- Entity: Federation of Bosnia and Herzegovina
- Canton: Central Bosnia
- Municipality: Dobretići

Area
  - Total: 0.90 sq mi (2.32 km^{2})

Population (2013)
  - Total: 89
  - Density: 99/sq mi (38/km^{2})
- Time zone: UTC+1 (CET)
  - Summer (DST): UTC+2 (CEST)

Pavlovići is a village in the municipality of Dobretići, Central Bosnia Canton, Bosnia and Herzegovina.

== Demographics ==
According to the 2013 census, its population was 89, all Croats.
