= Mala Usora =

River in Bosnia and Herzegovina

- Location within Bosnia and Herzegovina

Location
- Country: Bosnia and Herzegovina

Physical characteristics
- Mouth
  - location: Usora
  - coordinates: 44.6153°N 17.8536°E

Basin features
- Progression: Usora→ Bosna→ Sava→ Danube→ Black Sea

Mala Usora (English: Little Usora) is a river in central-northern Bosnia and Herzegovina. At its confluence with the Velika Usora River, at Teslić, it creates the Usora River.
