= Duboštica =

Village in Vareš, Bosnia and Herzegovina

- Village
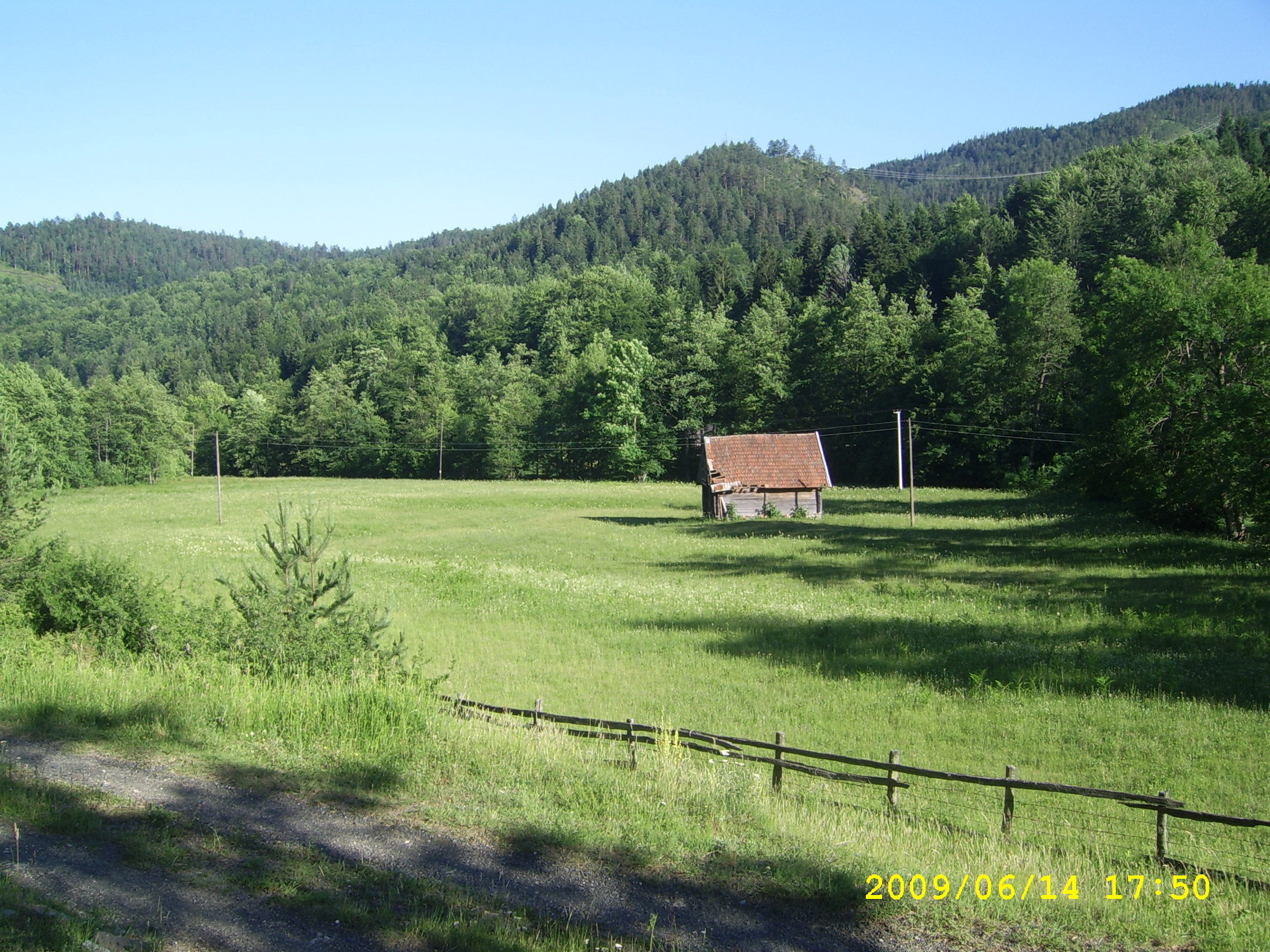

- Location within Bosnia and Herzegovina
- Coordinates: 44.2414511°N 18.3059226°E
- Country: Bosnia and Herzegovina
- Entity: Federation of Bosnia and Herzegovina
- Canton: Zenica-Doboj
- Municipality: Vareš

Area
  - Total: 9.62 sq mi (24.92 km^{2})

Population (2013)
  - Total: 56
  - Density: 5.8/sq mi (2.2/km^{2})
- Time zone: UTC+1 (CET)
  - Summer (DST): UTC+2 (CEST)

Duboštica is a village in the municipality of Vareš, Bosnia and Herzegovina.

== Demographics ==
According to the 2013 census, its population was 56.

Ethnicity in 2013
Ethnicity	Number	Percentage
Croats	48	85.7%
Bosniaks	3	5.4%
Serbs	2	3.6%
other/undeclared	3	5.4%
Total	56	100%
