= Kazimierz Kozica =

Polish historian (1965–2019)

- Born: 1965
- Died: October 20, 2019
- Education: University of Wrocław

Kazimierz Kozica (1965 – October 20, 2019) was a Polish historian of cartography, map expert (especially the old maps of Polish–Lithuanian Commonwealth and Silesia), teacher, curator. President of the Friends of the Royal Castle in Warsaw Association

== Career ==
Graduated in Wrocław in 1990 with a master's thesis on Population distribution and population density of the Wrocław Province 1: 200,000 [2 maps] written under the supervision of Władysław Pawlak., after which began teaching at the Department of Cartography of the Geographical Institute at the University of Wrocław, initially as an assistant, then as an adjunkt. In 1998 he completed his D.Phil. degree with a thesis 'The Existence of Milicz Fish-ponds and the Changings of Their Costal Line Based on Big-scale Old and Present-day Maps' at the Faculty of Natural Sciences From 1999 to 2009 professionally associated with the Polish collector based in Bitburg, Tomasz Niewodniczański, whose collections he described, catalogued and helped to organize exhibitions. Part of Niewodniczański's cartographic collection, covering the largest collection of old maps of Poland, was deposited at the Royal Castle Museum in Warsaw. Kazimierz Kozica became their curator in 2009.

He was the author of many publications on the history of cartography, including co-authoring catalogues of historical and cartographic exhibitions from the collection of Tomasz Niewodniczański: Imago Poloniae (Berlin, Warsaw 2002, Krakow, Wrocław 2003, Darmstadt 2004), Imago Lithuaniae (Vilnius 2002). The third great exhibition in the Imago... series was to be the Imago Ukrainae exhibition devoted to ancient maps of lands which are now part of today's Ukraine and the iconography of selected cities in the former eastern borderland of the Polish–Lithuanian Commonwealth (about 660 historical maps). The exhibition, planned since 2004, was not held for organizational reasons. As an organizer of historical map exhibitions, he was also the author of catalogues Dantiscum Emporium (Gdańsk 2004, Emden 2005), Magna Regio (Luxembourg 2007, Trier 2009); Silesia et Wratislavia - map of Silesia by Martin Helwig in Silesian cartography 1561-1889 (Wrocław 2014), Beautiful and rare - the most famous maps of the First Polish Republic from the collection of Tomasz Niewodniczański (Warsaw 2018). He also co-authored exhibitions at the Geodetic Museum of Warsaw Surveying Enterprise (WPG S.A.) - 100 globes for the 100th anniversary of the Polish Geographical Society (Warsaw 2018) and Europe, Poland, Warsaw over the centuries in geodesy and cartography (Warsaw 2015).

== Publications ==
- Imago Poloniae Dawna Rzeczpospolita na mapach, dokumentach i starodrukach w zbiorach Tomasza Niewodniczańskiego. co-author: Janusz Pezda ISBN 83-88823-16-7
- Martin Helwig's map of Silesia from 1561 - an unknown edition from 1612 in: MAPPÆ ANTIQUÆ Essays on the occasion of his 65th birthday Utrecht Studies in the History of Cartography, vol. 6 ed. Paula van Gestel-van het Schip and Peter van der Krogt ISBN 978 90 6194 479 9
- The "Charte des Koenigreichs Polen" by Johannes Walch (co-author: Michael Ritter) in: Cartographica Helvetica 36 (2007) pp. 3–10
- Different states of the sea chart of the Gulf of Riga by Lucas Janszoon Waghenaer (1534-1606) from his first sea atlas Spiegel der Zeevaert (1583/1585) in the Niewodniczański Collection Imago Poloniae at the Royal Castle in Warsaw
- 100 Globes for the First Centenary of the Polish Geographical Society. Polish Globes from the 19th to the 21st Century. Cartographers, publishers and Globemakers [100 Globusów na 100-Lecie Polskiego Towarzystwa Geograficznego Polskie globusy z XIX–XXI wieku. Kartografowie Wydawcy Producenci. co-author: Grażyna Połuzejko - Imago Mundi, The International Journal for the History of Cartography Volume 71, 2019
