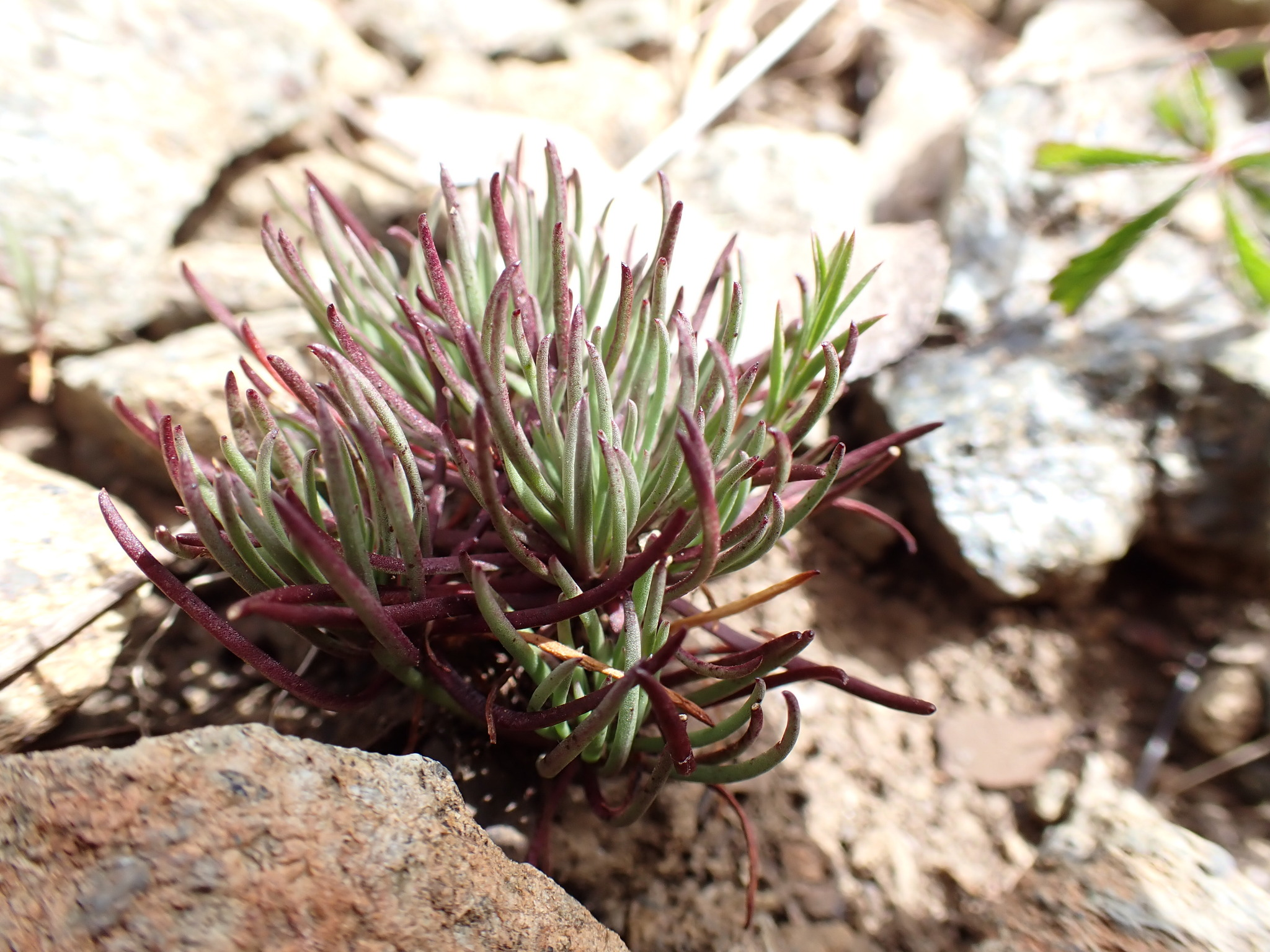

Scientific classification
- Kingdom: Plantae
- Clade: Tracheophytes
- Clade: Angiosperms
- Clade: Eudicots
- Order: Caryophyllales
- Family: Caryophyllaceae
- Genus: Balkana; Madhani & Zarre
- Species: B. spergulifolia

Binomial name
- Balkana spergulifolia (Griseb.) Madhani & Zarre

Synonyms
- List: Gypsophila serbica (Pančić) Degen (1905); Gypsophila spergulifolia Griseb. (1843); Gypsophila spergulifolia f. albanica Griseb. (1870), not validly publ.; Gypsophila spergulifolia f. serbica Griseb. (1870); Jordania spergulifolia Boiss. (1849)

= Balkana =

Balkana spergulifolia

Genus of flowering plants

for the lake in Bosnia and Herzegovina, see Balkana Lake

Balkana spergulifolia is a species of flowering plant in the carnation family, Caryophyllaceae. It is a subshrub native to the western Balkan Peninsula, including Albania, Bosnia and Herzegovina, and other neighboring former Yugoslav countries.
