= Grabovička River =

River in Bosnia and Herzegovina

Grabovička River Grabovačka River
- Location within Bosnia and Herzegovina
- Native name: Грабовичка ријека (Bosnian)

Location
- Country: Bosnia and Herzegovina

Physical characteristics
- Source
  - location: Ježica slopes
- Mouth: Vrbanja River
  - location: Grabovica, Kotor Varoš
  - coordinates: 44°29′55″N 17°30′50″E
- Length: 8 km (5.0 mi)
- Basin size: Black Sea

The Grabovička River (Bosnian: Grabovička rijeka / Грабовичка ријека, "Grabovica River") is a river in Bosnia and Herzegovina, one of the left tributaries of the Vrbanja River. It rises near Miljevići village (around 1,050 metres above sea level), below the road to Golo Brdo (Naked Hill), on the south slopes of Ježica (1276 m) and Zastijenje (loc: Zāstinje – Backrocks; 1,230 m).

Regional road Skender Vakuf – Travnik runs along the ridge of the Undervlašić's plateau. The ridge marked the border between Vrbanja's and Ugar basins. This river enters into a deep canyon, with depth as much as 350 meters. Grabovička River runs through this canyon near Grabovica, old village.

The mouth of Grabovička River is in the new part of Grabovica village (Bosnia) after which this river is named. In some sources it is (incorrectly) referred to as "Grabovačka River" (Bosnian: Grabovačka rijeka / Грабовачка ријека). The mouth is 450 meters above sea level and its length is around 8 km.

During the War in Bosnia, in Grabovica's Elementary school, around 200 Bosniaks "disappeared" from Večići village and its surrounding settlements. Their remains remain undiscovered.

== See also ==
- Šiprage
- Kotor Varoš
