= Crna River (Željeznica) =

- Location within Bosnia and Herzegovina
- Native name: Црна ријека (Bosnian)

Location
- Country: Bosnia and Herzegovina

Physical characteristics
- Source
  - location: Slopes between Jahorina and Trebević
  - coordinates: 43.666713906177115°N 18.621536872014314°E
  - elevation: 1,320 m (4,330 ft)
- Mouth
  - location: Željeznica
  - coordinates: 43°41′02″N 18°26′51″E
- Length: 10 km (6.2 mi)

Basin features
- Progression: Željeznica→ Bosna→ Sava→ Danube→ Black Sea

Crna River (Bosnian: Crna rijeka / Црна ријека, "Black River") is a right-hand tributary of the Željeznica, which is a tributary of the Bosna River, in Bosnia, Bosnia and Herzegovina. It springs between the slopes of Jahorina and Trebević. It arises from two streams: Duboki Creek (Duboki potok / Дубоки поток, "Deep Creek") and an unnamed one, both at an elevation of around 1320 m.

The water of the river is very clean, so that its utilization is planned in order to supply Sarajevo with drinking water by constructing a dam and a plant and connection to the water supply network.
