= Velika Usora =

Mala Usora
- Location within Bosnia and Herzegovina

Location
- Country: Bosnia and Herzegovina

Physical characteristics
- Mouth
  - location: Usora
  - coordinates: 44.6153°N 17.8536°E

Basin features
- Progression: Usora→ Bosna→ Sava→ Danube→ Black Sea

Velika Usora River (English: Big Usora) is a river in central-northern Bosnia and Herzegovina. At its confluence with the Mala Usora River, at Teslić, it creates the Usora River. The Velika Usora has been historically important for the industrial development of Teslić, including a chemical factory and a steam-powered sawmill.
