= Matuzići =

- Village
- Location within Bosnia and Herzegovina
- Coordinates: 44°41′N 18°03′E
- Country: Bosnia and Herzegovina
- Entity: Federation of Bosnia and Herzegovina
- Canton: Zenica-Doboj
- Municipality: Doboj South

Area
  - Total: 1.55 sq mi (4.01 km^{2})

Population (2013)
  - Total: 2,591
  - Density: 1,670/sq mi (646/km^{2})
- Time zone: UTC+1 (CET)
  - Summer (DST): UTC+2 (CEST)

Matuzići is a city in the municipality of Doboj South, Bosnia and Herzegovina.

== Demographics ==
According to the 2013 census, its population was 2,591.

Ethnicity in 2013
Ethnicity	Number	Percentage
Bosniaks	2,513	97.0%
Serbs	6	0.2%
Croats	4	0.2%
other/undeclared	68	2.6%
Total	2,591	100%
