= Kozica (Fojnica) =

Kozica Козица
- Village
- Location within Bosnia and Herzegovina
- Coordinates: 44°1′6″N 17°52′32″E
- Country: Bosnia and Herzegovina
- Entity: Federation of Bosnia and Herzegovina
- Canton: Central Bosnia
- Municipality: Fojnica

Area
  - Total: 1.32 sq mi (3.42 km^{2})

Population (2013)
  - Total: 12
  - Density: 9.1/sq mi (3.5/km^{2})
- Time zone: UTC+1 (CET)
  - Summer (DST): UTC+2 (CEST)

Kozica (Cyrillic: Козица) is a village in the municipality of Fojnica, Bosnia and Herzegovina.

== Demographics ==
According to the 2013 census, its population was 12, all Bosniaks.
