= Obodnik =

Coordinates: 44.5711°N 17.4875°E

Obodnik is a village in the municipality of Kotor Varoš, Republika Srpska in Bosnia and Herzegovina. This settlement is located at the mouth of Kruševica and Vigošća in Vrbanja river (altitude 340 m). From this location Vrbanja valley expands into Večićko polje and the plateau around Vrbanjci. Highway M-4 runs through Obodnik. The road to Šiprage and Kruševo Brdo also runs from this village.

== Population ==
Ethnic Group	1991.
Serbs	833
Bosniaks	0
Croats	4
Yugoslavians	3
Others	2
Total	842
