= Usora (river) =

River in Bosnia and Herzegovina

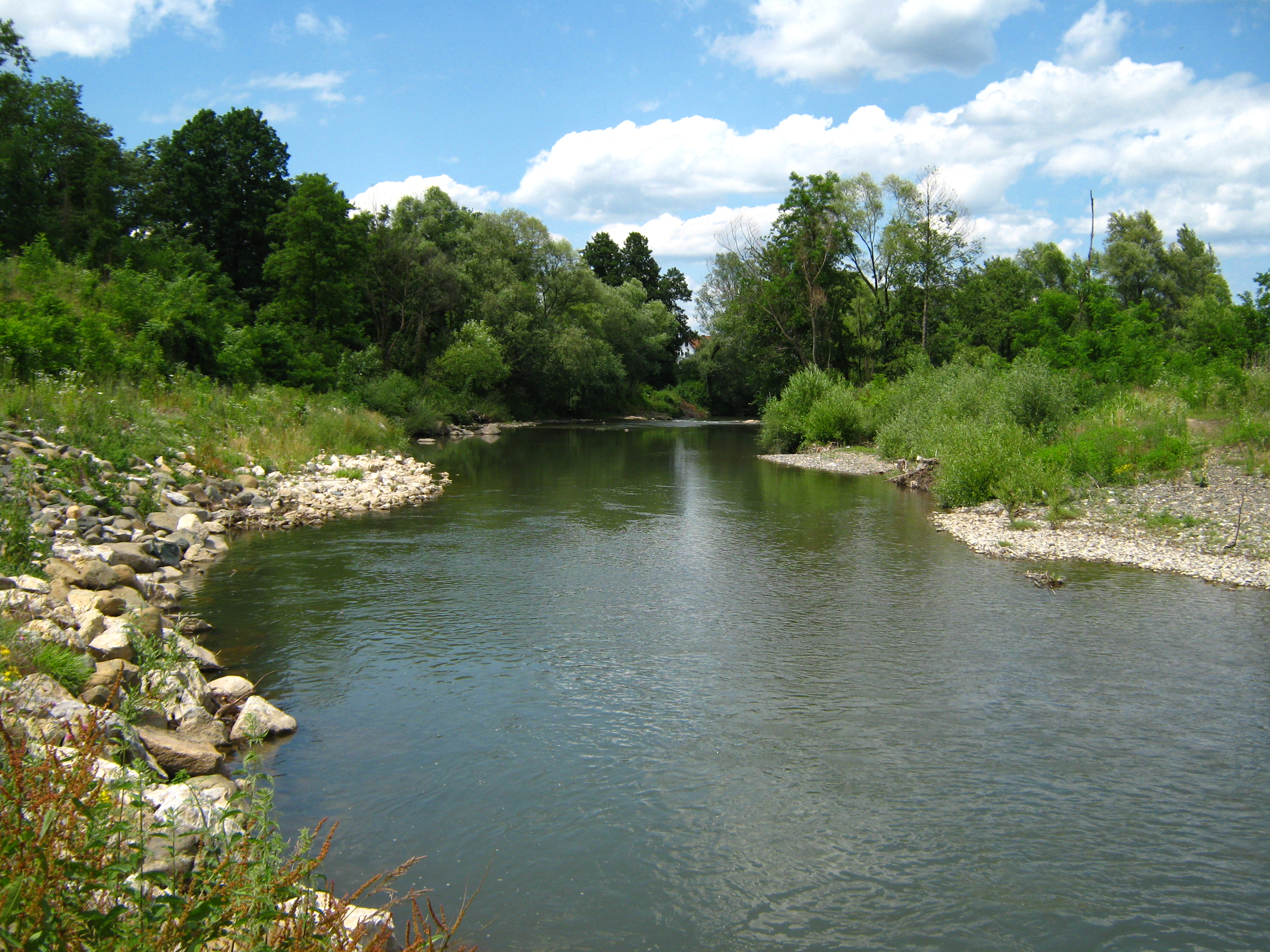

- Location within Bosnia and Herzegovina

Location
- Country: Bosnia and Herzegovina

Physical characteristics
- Source
  - elevation: 880 m (2,890 ft)
- Mouth
  - location: Bosna
  - coordinates: 44.705335°N 18.068977°E
  - elevation: 145 m (476 ft)
- Length: 77.0 km (47.8 mi) (including Velika Usora)

Basin features
- Progression: Bosna→ Sava→ Danube→ Black Sea

Usora (Serbian Cyrillic: Усора) is a river in central-northern Bosnia and Herzegovina. It begins at the confluence of two smaller Usora rivers, Mala Usora and Velika Usora, at the town of Teslić. Usora runs for some 20 km northeast of Teslić, and becomes a left tributary of the Bosna River, south of Doboj. Its total length (including Velika Usora) is 77.0 km (47.8 mi).
