= Crkvenica =

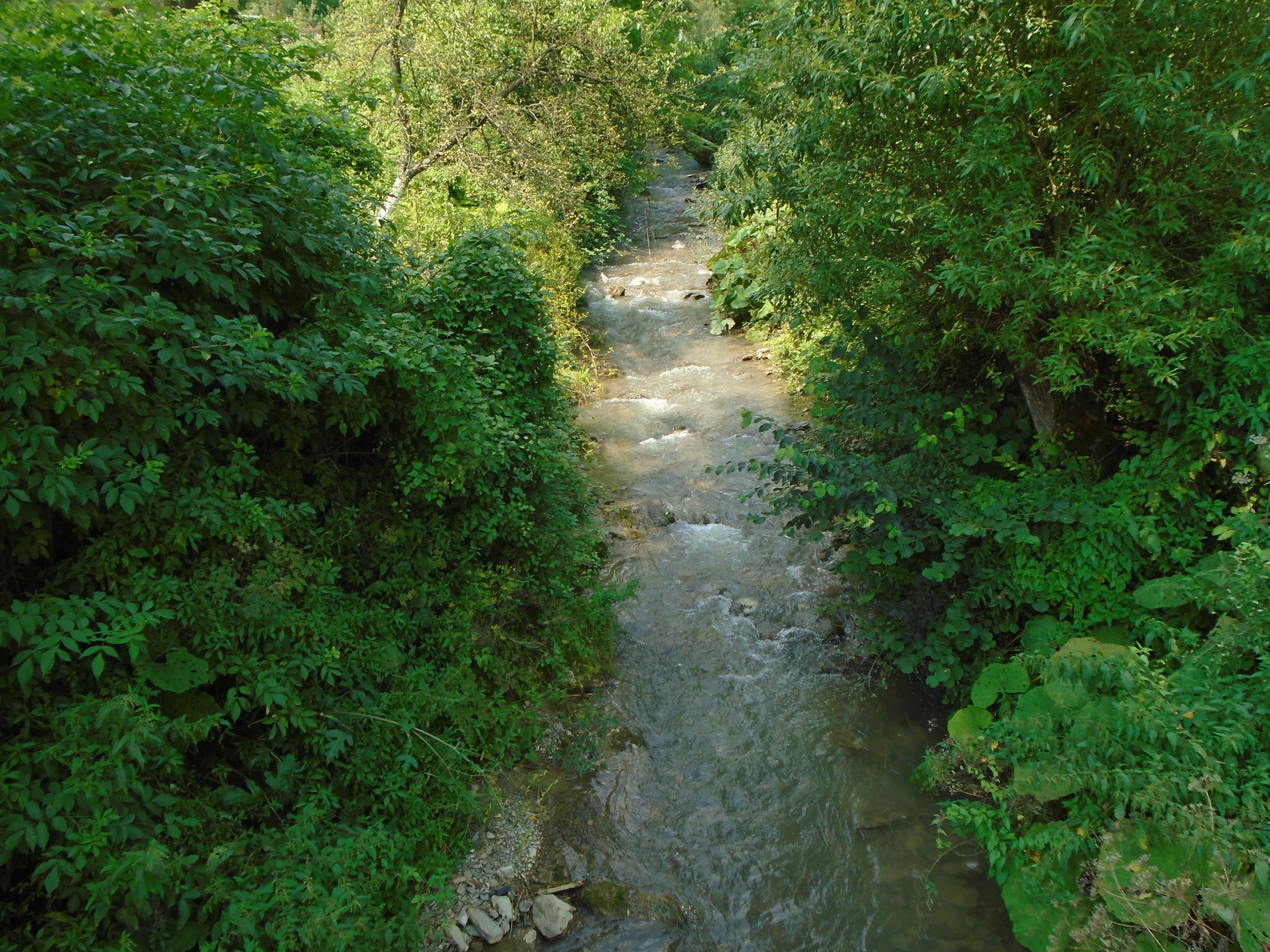

- Location within Bosnia and Herzegovina
- Native name: Црквеница (Serbian)

Location
- Country: Bosnia and Herzegovina

Physical characteristics
- Source
  - location: Šipraška brda
  - elevation: 1,200 m (3,900 ft)
- Mouth
  - location: Vrbanja
  - coordinates: 44.467837°N 17.568474°E
- Length: 12 km (7.5 mi)

Basin features
- Progression: Vrbanja→ Vrbas→ Sava→ Danube→ Black Sea

The Crkvenica (Serbian Cyrillic: Црквеница) is a Bosnian river. It is a right bank tributary of the Vrbanja River.

The Crkvenica rises between the northwestern slopes of Očauš and Šipraška brda mountains, flowing southeast at around 1,200 metres (3,900 ft) above sea level. The river drains the central part of the northern slopes of the Dinaric mountain massif and its mouth is in Šiprage (Kotor Varoš) with a length of 12 kilometres (7.5 mi).

The river is known for its water mills; during the 1950s, they numbered approximately 18.

The narrow area of its headwaters contains a watershed between the confluence of the Vrbas and the Bosna Rivers.

Tufa stećci on the Crkvenica riverbank is a relic of the Bogomil settlement in the twelfth century. The stećci was originally located at the confluence of the Crkvenica and the Vrbanja. The stones were quarried and built into the walls of the surrounding buildings, possibly due to belief in their miraculous properties. One of the most well-preserved tombstones is in its original location, submerged in the River Vrbanja.
