= Kruševo Brdo =

Kruševo Brdo Kruševo Brdo
- Village
- Location within Republika Srpska Location within Bosnia and Herzegovina
- Coordinates: 44°24′40″N 17°37′49″E
- Country: Bosnia and Herzegovina
- Entity: Republika Srpska
- Municipality: Kotor Varoš
- Time zone: UTC+1 (CET)
  - Summer (DST): UTC+2 (CEST)

Kruševo Brdo is a village in Bosnia and Herzegovina, Republika Srpska, municipality Kotor Varoš in geographical region Bosanska Krajina. It is administratively divided into Krševo Brdo I and II.

== Geography ==
This settlement is located at the beginning of the valley of the Vrbanja river. It is situated on the northeastern slopes of the Kruševo Brdo mountain (1,178 m) and Milanovo brdo (southwest side of the hill, 1,022 m), The valley spreads along Vrbanja river to its estuary in Vrbas (Banja Luka). Kruševo Brdo consists of many hamlets that are scattered on the slopes of Krusevo and Milan's hills that are the parts of the Vlasic masiff. On the slopes of Milan's hills there are: Trifunovići Jankovići, Novakovići and Gavranovići (right bank of Vrbanja), and Potok, Pavlovići, Panići and Čudnić on left slopes (northeast of Kruševo hill). Central hamlet is Čudnić (612 m) at the mouth of the eponymous waterflow, below Arapov Brijeg (Arabs hill, 928 m above sea level). All local roads descend into this place. In hamlet of Čudnić is the mouth of two rivers: Bobovica and Čudnić. Above Panići hamlet (on Ravni Omar plateau) flowing Ilomska. Distance surrounding localities from the Central point (hamlet Čudnić):

- Bobovice (2.6 km)
- Gelići (3.5 km)
- Jankovići (2.6 km)
- Javorje (0.2 km)
- Mali Brić (5.2 km)
- Novakovići (3.3 km)
- Pavlovići (5.2 km)
- Pilipovina (4.8 km)
- Veliki Brić (4.4 km)

Places near Krusevo brdo Struzic - Aleksin potok - Americka strana - Arapov brijeg - Babanovac - Bagici - Balabanovac - Barnice - Baturovac - Bijeda - Bijelo bucje - Bile vode - Biljeg - Bilska kosa - Biser glavica - Krusevo brdo

Kruševo Brdo is administratively divided into Kruševo Brdo I and Kruševo Brdo II. According to the last census in the Former Yugoslavia, in both of these parts were in total 793 persons.

== History ==
Archaeological records confirm the existence of a Roman settlement in the nearby Šiprage (in the sixth century or earlier), while tufa stećci has testified to the Old Bosnian (Bogomils) settlement in the twelfth century. T

In the seventh century this area was populated by South Slavs who were mixing all this with the natives until the present day. The autochthonous population of "Dobri Bošnjani" (Good Bosnians) in Kruševo Brdo and Šiprage area were et least in majority. The first Bosnian State was established in the 10th century.

In the medieval ages, Kruševo Brdo belonged to the old state of Bosnia, province of Donji kraji (Lower regions), and after it was occupied by the Ottomans (1519).

In 1878 to power come from the Austro-Hungarian Monarchy and remain until the occurrence of the First Yugoslavia. The primary intention of the Austro-Hungarian Administration (1878–1914) by the construction of the narrow-tracks railway line was that, with the mediation of the national Government in BiH, it intensifies the exploitation of forest and other natural resources. The railroad came from Kotor Varoš, and in the area of Šipraga is diverse in several directions. From The Kruševo Brdo are two-tailed went to stripes: along Vrbanjia and Bobovica upstreams. The route along the Vrbanja is made via the Kilavac to the Čekrk ("winch handles" ) and then – after transport locomotives, using the spacious spindle (in the gorge between Šepirice) – up to Riječica (1300 m). Branching with Bobovica was passing through the village of Bobovice, and between Pašinac and Palike to Srebrena brda (Silver Hills; according to Meokrnje mountain), i.e. to the mouth of the stream Krna (921 m). On the trackbed of deconstructed tracks, they later built the local road for the many Šiprage's villages.

After the 1 December 1918, Kruševo Brdo was in Kingdom of Serbs, Croats and Slovenians, and Kingdom of Yugoslavia (to 1941). During 2nd World War, the nearby Šiprage was a powerful stronghold and a sanctuary more partisan units, including 12th Divisian Hospital (in the Gorge of Demićka), serviceing its 5th Corpus. In contrast, Kruševo Brdo was strongly Chetnik stronghold. One of the last Chetnik gangs in Bosnia liquidated several years after the War. It was on the locality Divič.

On 6 January 1944, the Germans broke through the partisan defence lines on the Raskršće locality (Crossroads) between the villages of Sopan and Kerle. On 7 January, entered the Centre Šiprage, where are the others up to 15 January 1944. Even though area of Šiprage was and left out the most important they, the more times it is bombed, with attacks of Germans and Chetniks forces, including the units of Draža Mihailović. Deep river cliffs on the slopes of the Brestovačea (between Zlovarići and Dunići villages, i.e. Dunići's rocks) was hardly noticeable for the German aviation. During so called „ 6th Enemy Offensive" in Bosnia, former Yugoslavia, the 12th Division's Mobil Hospital were established, for theirs 5th Corpus (1943/1944). This hospital was in two baracs and few dwelling pits. It was survived to tactics dislocation on other places (4 January 1944). That was in spite of multiple Luftwaffe's bombing on nearby Šiprage (because unprecious localizing of main target – the hospital). As a precaution the Hospital it was dispersed into the surrounding villages and further to Korićani. Then it was about 600 injured and patients moved into the surrounding villages, including service at the Čudnić and Kruševo Brdo. After the passage of the Offensive against, for ten days (at 15 January 1944), it was returning again in Šiprage.

After the Second World War Kruševo Brdo was the Local Community (to 1964th) in the Municipality of Šiprage, County of Kotor Varoš.

During the War in Bosnia (1992–95), Bosnian Serb Army and police devastated the surrounding Bosniak villages, especially those upstream along the Vrbanja to Kruševo Brdo, as well as all Bosniak villages downstream to Banja Luka. The local civilian population were killed or displaced. After 1996, most of the Šiprage's Bosniak villages was partly restored, thanks to the Battalion BELUGA within the SFOR-EUFOR Mission.

== See also ==
- Vrbanja river
- Ilomska
- Bobovica
- Čudnić
- Vlašić
- Šiprage
- Kotor Varoš
