= Vrbanja (river) =

River in Bosnia and Herzegovina

Vrbanja Врбања
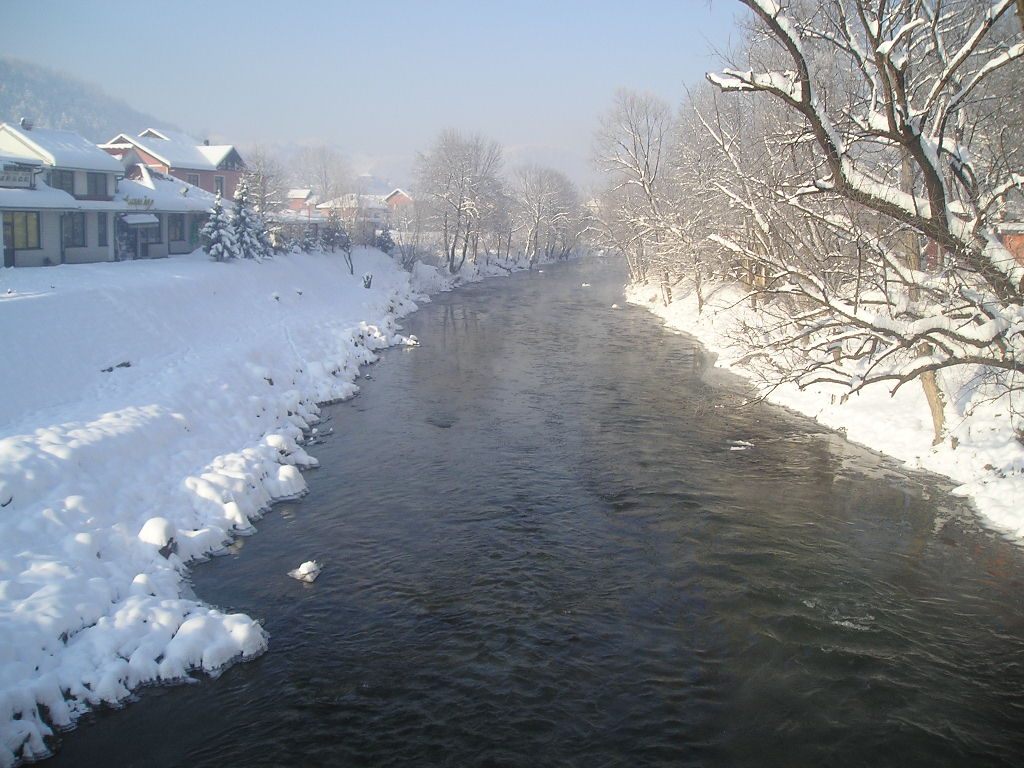
- The Vrbanja river in Čelinac in winter

- Location within Bosnia and Herzegovina

Location
- Country: Bosnia and Herzegovina

Physical characteristics
- Source
  - location: Vlašić
  - coordinates: 44.354007°N 17.636302°E
  - elevation: 1,520 m (4,990 ft)
- Mouth
  - location: Vrbas
  - coordinates: 44°46′44″N 17°13′12″E
  - elevation: 164 m (538 ft)
- Length: 70.5 km (43.8 mi)

Basin features
- Progression: Vrbas→ Sava→ Danube→ Black Sea

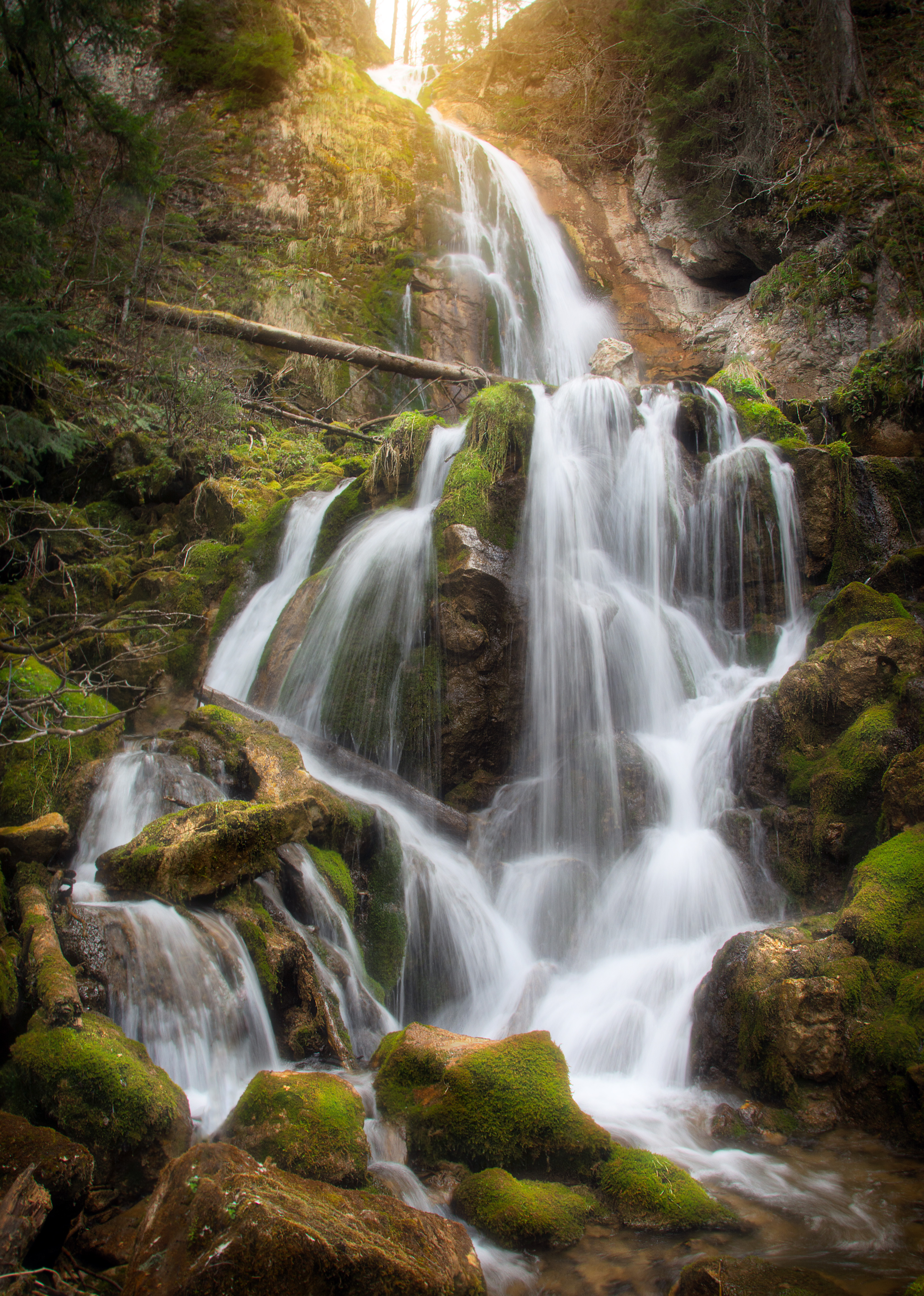
The upper course of the Vrbanja River

The Vrbanja (Serbian Cyrillic: Врбања) is a river in Central Bosnia, Bosnia and Herzegovina; with Ugar, the largest right tributary of the Vrbas. Its basin covers an area of approximately 703.5 km^{2}. The Vrbanja has significant hydropower potential. There are many different estimations of the Vrbanja's length, from 70.5 km and 84 km to 95.4 km.

== Name ==
Like many other sites in Bosnia, Vrbanja is named after the willows that grow along the river from Kruševo Brdo to Banja Luka. Other examples are Vrbanjci village and Vrbanja, near Banja Luka, as well as Vrbas and a Vrbanja bridge in the center of Sarajevo.

== Geography ==
The Vrbanja source is on the slopes of Vlašić Mountain, upstream of Pilipovina village (at about 1,530 meters above sea level). The area around the source is called "Prelivode", with a radius of around 2-3 kilometers. Prelivode is on a ridge between the Vlašić (1933 m) and Meokrnje (1425 m) mountains.

The Vrbanja flows through Kruševo Brdo, Šiprage, Obodnik, Vrbanjci, Kotor Varoš, Zabrđe, Čelinac and the settlement of Vrbanja. It joins the Vrbas river in Banja Luka.

During the Austro-Hungarian administration of 1878–1914, a wide network of railway communications was built along the Vrbanja, with the support of the Bosnian Government. Exploitation of the natural resources (especially wood and mining) was the primary intended purpose of this investment. The railroad was built along the valley of the Vrbanja from Kotor Varoš to Šiprage, where it branched along a few tributaries of the river. It leads to the area of the Riječice, across the pass between Jasen and Šepirice.

== Tributaries ==
The river is fed by numerous tributaries from Vlašić, Čemernica, Borja and Uzlomac mountains. The most significant right-side tributaries are the Bobovica, Lopača, Trnovac, Crkvenica, Kruševica, Jezerka, Bosanka, and Jošavka, and the most significant left-side tributaries, the Čudnić, Ćorkovac, Demićka, Sadika, Grabovička rijeka, Duboka river, Vigošća/Vigošta, Cvrcka and Jakotina.

== Vrbanja valley in Bosnian war ==
During the War in Bosnia (1992 – 1995), Serbian Police and Army forces destroyed many of the surrounding Bosniak and Croat villages along the Vrbanja valley, from Kruševo Brdo downstream to Banja Luka. The local civilian population was killed or displaced and their homes and properties were destroyed.

== Gallery ==
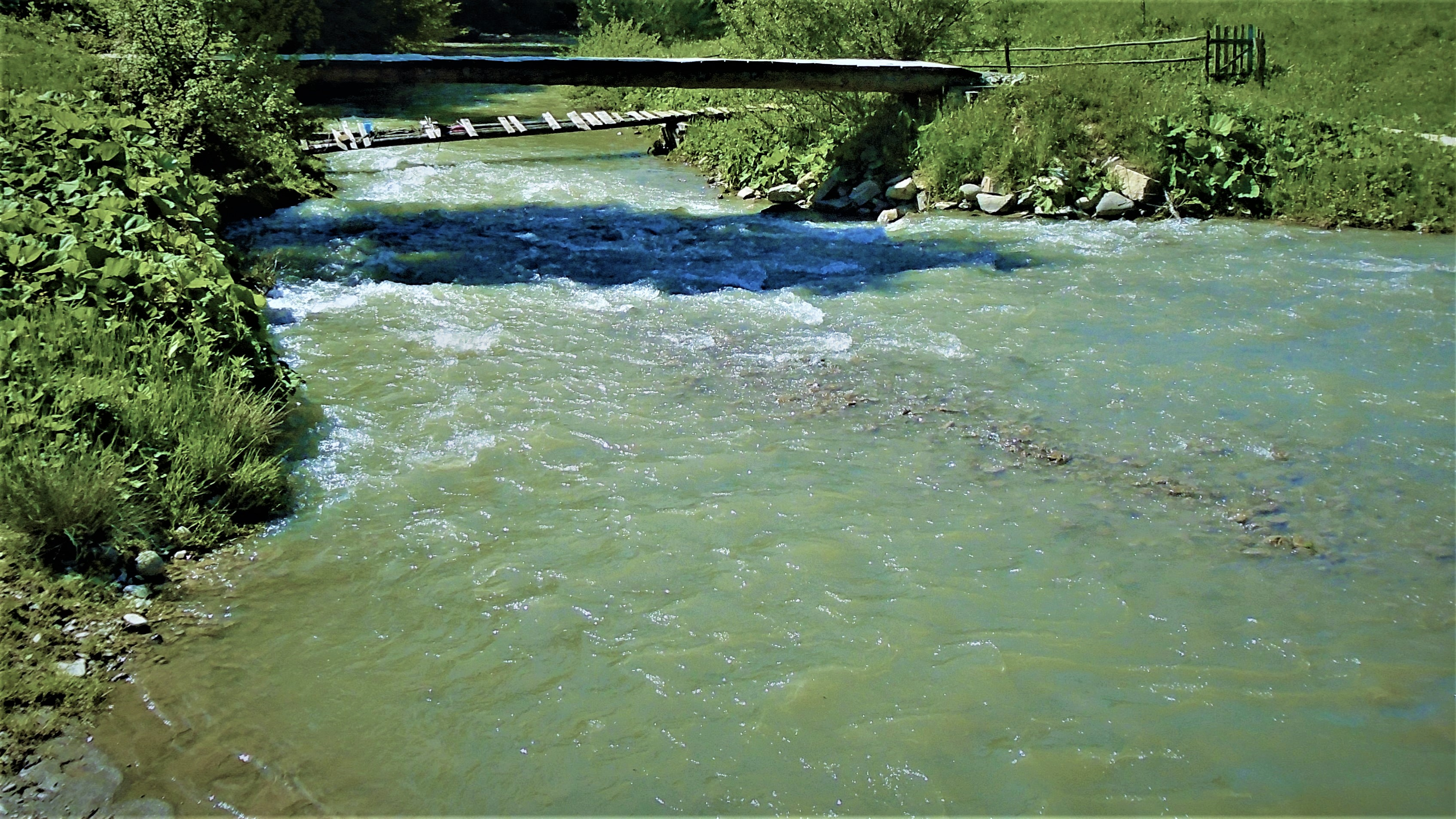
Vbanja river at Tuleška bridge locality, near Šiprage

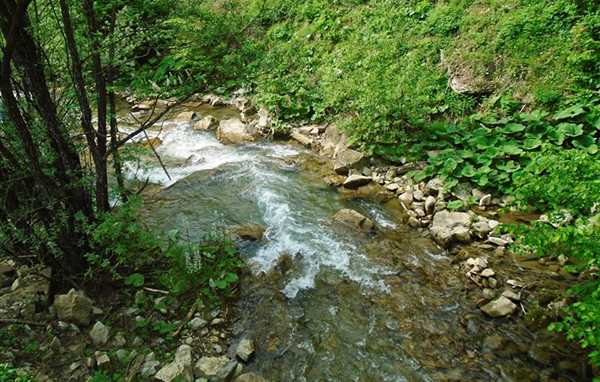
Vrbanja river in Kruševo Brdo

== See also ==
- Vrbas
- Vlašić
- Kruševo Brdo
- Šiprage
- Kotor Varoš
- Čelinac
- Banja Luka
