= Šiprage =

Šiprage Шипраге
- Village
- Location in Bosnia and Herzegovina
- Coordinates: 44°27′57″N 17°33′45″E
- Country: Bosnia and Herzegovina
- Entity: Republika Srpska
- Municipality: Kotor Varoš
- Founded: Not later than the 5th century
- Highest elevation: 520 m (1,710 ft)
- Lowest elevation: 507 m (1,663 ft)

Population (1991)
  - Total: 952
- Demonym: Šipražani
- Time zone: Central European
- Area code: +387 (051)
- Website: http://www.opstinakotorvaros.com/

Šiprage (Serbian Cyrillic: Шипраге) is a settlement municipality in Kotor Varoš Municipality, Republika Srpska, Bosnia and Herzegovina.

The administrative status of this populated place was changed – from the local community has grown a municipality in the County of Kotor Varoš but in the 1950s it was returned to the level of local community.

== Name ==
The modern name is derived from noble–bey (Omer-bey) family Šipraga. It is unclear whether their ancestors represent autochthonous population or they migrated into the area and acquired spacious property in the valley of the river Vrbanja and its tributaries. According to the oral traditions and cadastre records, their expansion started from Pougarje (slopes of Vlašić Mountain) in the valley of River Ugar.

== Geography ==
Šiprage is on the Vrbanja river, on its south-eastern upstream line of the Banja Luka (about 60 km) and the Kotor Varoš (30 km) and the center is part of the local community. Located in the long valley between several mountain ranges: north-east Šipraško Brdo (Šiprage's Hill) with Glavić top, 950 m, south: Jasik (769 m), to the southeast of the complex Šahinovina–Stražbenica (848 m), west: Radohova (top: Kape, 950 m) and the north-west: Borčići (799 m) with Hrastik.

The settlement, along with Vrbanja and its tributaries, is about three long and two kilometers wide. It is rich in sources of drinking water, one of which is (along the Crkvenica) used to supply the local aqueduct network. In the place, in Vrbanja confluence there are flowing: Musić potok (stream), Crkvenica and Bakin potok (Grandmother's Creek), on the right side, but Ćorkovac, Zagradinski potok (Creek) and Demićka on the left riverside.

== Climate ==
In the Šiprage local and around area there is moderate continental climate, with the expressed four seasons: spring, summer, autumn and winter. On the hills around the mountain and subalpine, annual fluctuations in temperature and rainfall are relatively high, but with the long-term stability.

Long-term ("historical") climate parametres for Šiprage

Month	Average temperature (°C)	Minimal temperature (°C)	Maximal temperature (°C)	Precipitation / Rainfall (mm)
January	–1.7	–4.8	1.4	59
February	0.3	–3.6	4.2	63
March	4.6	–0.1	9.3	59
April	9.1	3.9	14.3	74
May	13.6	8.1	19.2	90
June	17.2	11.5	22.9	99
July	18.9	12.6	25.3	81
August	18.4	11.9	24.9	76
September	14.7	8.6	20.9	71
October	9.5	4.7	14.4	79
November	4.4	1	7.8	100
December	0.1	–2.7	3	88

- The variation in the precipitation between the driest and wettest months is 41 mm. During the year, the average temperatures vary by 20.6 °C.

== Nature and ecology ==
In the Šiprage's Valley and on the surrounding slopes, along with the Vrbanja river and its tributaries, there stretches the surface of arable land, with belts of mixed deciduous and coniferous forests (spruce and abies, white and black pine) and mixed woods of beech and hornbeam. In these ecosystems and mountain meadows there are big and small game (bear, wild boar, wolf, fox, rabbit, hedgehog, badger, marten and weasel, hedgehog, etc.), including Bosnian endemic quarry mammals.

Pastures, cutters and a catchment area covering the life of the natural community (biocenosis) of the associated vegetation zones. But upstream from the Obodnik village and all the way to Tomina Luka (Tom's field) in its upper flow, the Vrbanja confluence belongs to the salmonid waters. However, at first the grayling, after huchen too, and now brown trout will gradually fade away. Grayling is completely missing in the 1970s, and the survival of trout endanger numerous natural and anthropogenic factors. It is especially extreme flooding during 2000th. There are the irrational fishing and pollution with sludge and secondary by-products of exploitation of forest resources. Picking a fish stock is trying to compensate for the regular stocking of, which in turn leads to the question of local populations gene pool, because of the autochthonous specificities, even in the source area of the flows of the Vrbanja river and its tributaries.

== History ==
According to sources, the first settlement in the Vrbanja river valley dates to the Neolithic. This area was then inhabited by the Illyrian tribe of Maezaeis, and in the 4th century BC Celts. From the Roman period there are several sites in Šiprage at the mouth Crkvenica – in Vrbanja river ("at the field of Omer Bey Šipraga," 1891), discovered the remains of an early Christian basilica (3rd - 5th century). Archaeological records confirm the existence of a Roman settlement at this location, while the stećci dates to the 12th century. The original location of stećci was confluence of rivulet Crkvenica and River Vrbanja (at the very rivers' banks). They were cut out and built in the walls of the surrounding buildings (possibly due to the beliefs of their miraculous properties). One of the best preserved stećak is submerged in River Vrbanja, in the immediate proximity of its primary location. In the Middle Ages, Šiprage belonged to the state of Bosnia, part of the province of Donji Kraji ("Lower regions"), and was later occupied by the Ottomans (1519). In 1878 the region became part of the Austro-Hungarian Monarchy, and in 1918, Yugoslavia.

During World War II, Šiprage was a Partisan stronghold, and site of the 12th Division Hospital (in Demić gorge), serving its 5th Corpus. In the area of Šiprage, at the very beginning of the war, there were several local partisan unit forces that were later included in larger formations. On 6 January 1944, the Germans broke through the partisan defence lines on the Raskršće locality between the villages of Stopan and Kerle, and the next day entered (at sunrise, 7 January) the centre of Šiprage, where they stayed until 15 January 1944.

The town was bombed and attacked by Germans and Chetniks, including the units of Draža Mihailović. During the „6th Enemy Offensive" in Bosnia, the 12th Division's Mobil Hospital was established for their 5th Corpus (1943/1944); the hospital survived despite multiple Luftwaffe's bombing on nearby Šiprage). As a precaution, the hospital was relocated to the surrounding villages and further to Korićani. Then it was about 600 injured and patients moved into the village of Stopan and Lozići, then in Palivuk, Čudnić and Kruševo Brdo. After the passage of the Offensive against, for ten days (at 15 January 1944), it was returning again in Šiprage. Later it turned out that even enemy forces did not have precise information about its location. After the War, in 1960, skeletal remains from a grave in the woods were moved to a common Partisan Memorial Cemetery in Šiprage.

=== Bosnian War ===
During the Bosnian War (1992–95), Bosnian Serb Police and Army forces destroyed the surrounding Bosniak villages, especially those upstream along the Vrbanja to Kruševo Brdo, as well as Bosniak and Croat villages downstream to Banja Luka, and in the whole of central Bosnia.

One of the 18 camps for detained Bosniaks from the Kotor Varoš Municipality was at the Police station (MUP) in Šiprage.

After 1996, most of the Bosniak villages were partly restored thanks to the Luxembourgish government and soldiers of the BELUGA battalion within the SFOR-EUFOR Mission. Only mosque in wide area is renewed. During the war, an Orthodox church was built in the centre of the village, on the site of the former "Forestry House" and former seat of the local administration.

== Population ==
=== Overview by census ===
Year	1879.	1885.	1895.	1910	1921.	1931.	1948.	1953.	1961.	1971.	1981.	1991.	2013.
Population	64 (1312**)	277 (1575**)	88 (1426**)	159 (760**)	999	5.098*	1.774	7.764*	828	822	1.183	952	788

- 1931. and 1953.: Šiprage Municipality.
  - Šiprage area

Šiprage Total population 2013: 788
Census Year	1991.	1981.	1971.
Bosniaks	745 (78.25%)	711 (60.10%)	422 (51.33%)
Serbs	168 (17.64%)	320 (27.04%)	370 (45.01%)
Croats	1 (0.10%)	6 (0.50%)	0
Yugoslavians	32 (3.36%)	136 (11.49%)	21 (2.55%)
Other and Unknown	6 (0.63%)	10 (0.84%)	9 (1.09%)
Total	952	1,183	822

Historical population
Year	Pop.	±%
1961	828	—
1971	822	−0.7%
1981	1,183	+43.9%
1991	952	−19.5%
2013	788	−17.2%
Source data
