= Vrbas (river) =

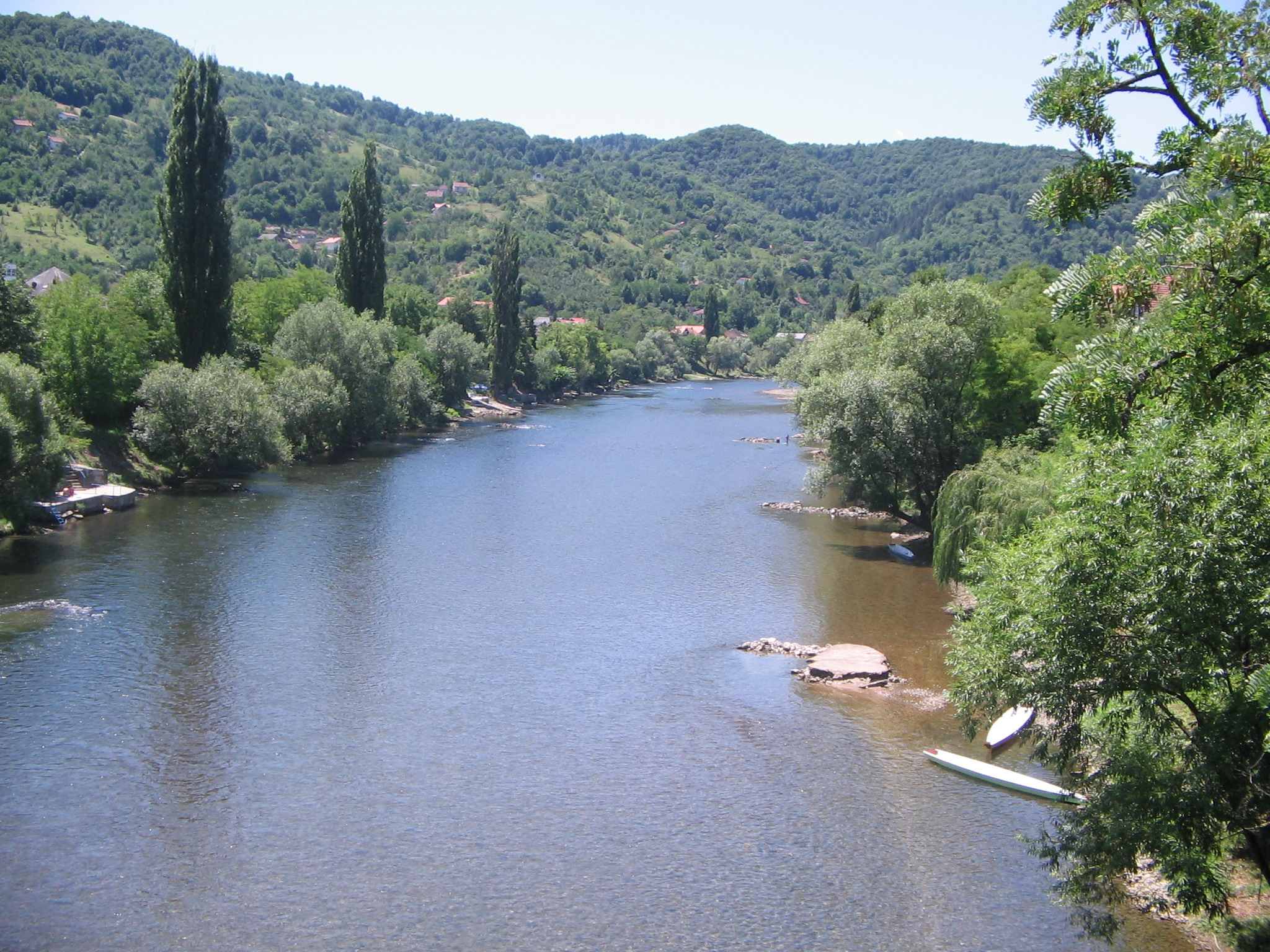
- Vrbas River in Bosnia and Herzegovina

Location
- Country: Bosnia and Herzegovina

Physical characteristics
- Source
  - location: Vranica
- Mouth
  - location: Sava
  - coordinates: 45.108°N 17.514°E
- Length: 249.7 km (155.2 mi)
- Basin size: 6,274 km^{2} (2,422 sq mi)

Basin features
- Progression: Sava→ Danube→ Black Sea

The Vrbas (Serbian Cyrillic: Врбас, pronounced [ʋr̩̂ba(ː)s]) is a major river with a length of 250 kilometres (160 mi), in western Bosnia and Herzegovina. It is a right tributary of the Sava river. The city of Banja Luka is located on the river banks.

The river is the main watercourse of Banja Luka and its surrounding region. With its blue-green color, it is one of the most beautiful rivers in Bosnia and Herzegovina.

== Etymology ==
The word vrba means 'willow' in Serbo-Croatian, and a number of weeping willow trees adorn the river banks in Banja Luka.

It lent its name to one of the provinces (banovinas) of the Kingdom of Yugoslavia, the Vrbas Banovina.

== Tributaries ==
The most important right tributaries are the Desna river, the Ugar, and the Vrbanja, and left: Prusačka river, Semešnica, the Pliva, the Crna Rijeka (Black River), and the Suturlija, which are located in the middle part of the basin.

== Geography and sectioning ==
It is a right tributary of the river Sava. It is one of the largest rivers in Bosnia and Herzegovina.

=== Upper Vrbas ===
The Vrbas river rises on the southern slope of the Vranica mountain near the town of Gornji Vakuf, at around 1,530 metres (5,020 ft) above sea level and it drains the central part of the northern slopes of the Dinaric mountain massif. The Upper Vrbas is a section between its source and the town of Jajce, encompassing the entire valley between Bugojno, Gornji Vakuf-Uskoplje and Donji Vakuf, and the gorge between Donji Vakuf and Jajce.

=== Middle Vrbas ===
Middle Vrbas mostly comprises a canyon section, with steep slopes and narrow passages, between Jajce and Banja Luka.

=== Lower Vrbas ===
The Lower Vrbas is the last section of the river, passing through lowlands of Lijevče Polje, approaching the Sava River. It empties into the Sava river at around 90 metres (300 ft) above sea level. Total length of the main watercourse is around 250 kilometres (160 mi).

== Climate ==
Average annual rainfall is around 800 L/m^{2} at the mouth of the Vrbas to the Sava river and up to 1500 L/m^{2} in the southern part of the basin. Characteristic mean flow is around 34.6 L/s/km^{2}. Maximum rainfall occurs in the southern parts of the Vrbas basin in the late autumn and winter months, with minimum quantities in summer, whereas the northern parts of the basin receive the largest quantities of rain during the summer months (June–July), with the maximum in November and December.

== Ichthyofauna ==
The Vrbas basin is known for an abundant ichthyofauna, rich in species, and recreational and fly fishing are very popular on entire cours of the river. Especially important but critically endangered is huchen, variation of hucho species endemic for the river Danube basin (hence known as Danube Salmon or Danube Taimen; Lat. Hucho hucho). Of all the Vrbas tributaries only the river Vrbanja, and possibly Ugar, also retain healthy population of this endemic fish. Vrbas are headwaters are important spawning grounds for both, huchen and its prey, Common nase (Chondrostoma nasus) and Grayling (Thymallus thymallus).

== Tourism and recreation ==
Rafting is very popular on the Vrbas. It is also one of the most popular form of recreation in Bosnia and Herzegovina. The main attraction of the area is Vrbas canyon.

In 2005, the European Championships in Rafting were held on the Vrbas and the Tara rivers in Bosnia and Herzegovina. According to the International Rafting Federation, the event was hugely successful. In May 2009 the World Rafting Championships were held again in Bosnia and Herzegovina on the Vrbas and Tara rivers.

== Gallery ==
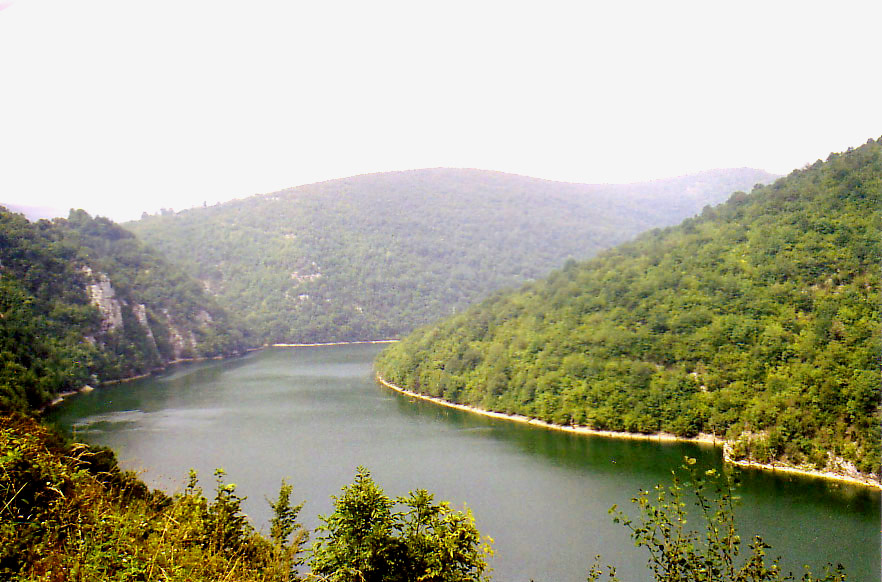
Near Banja Luka

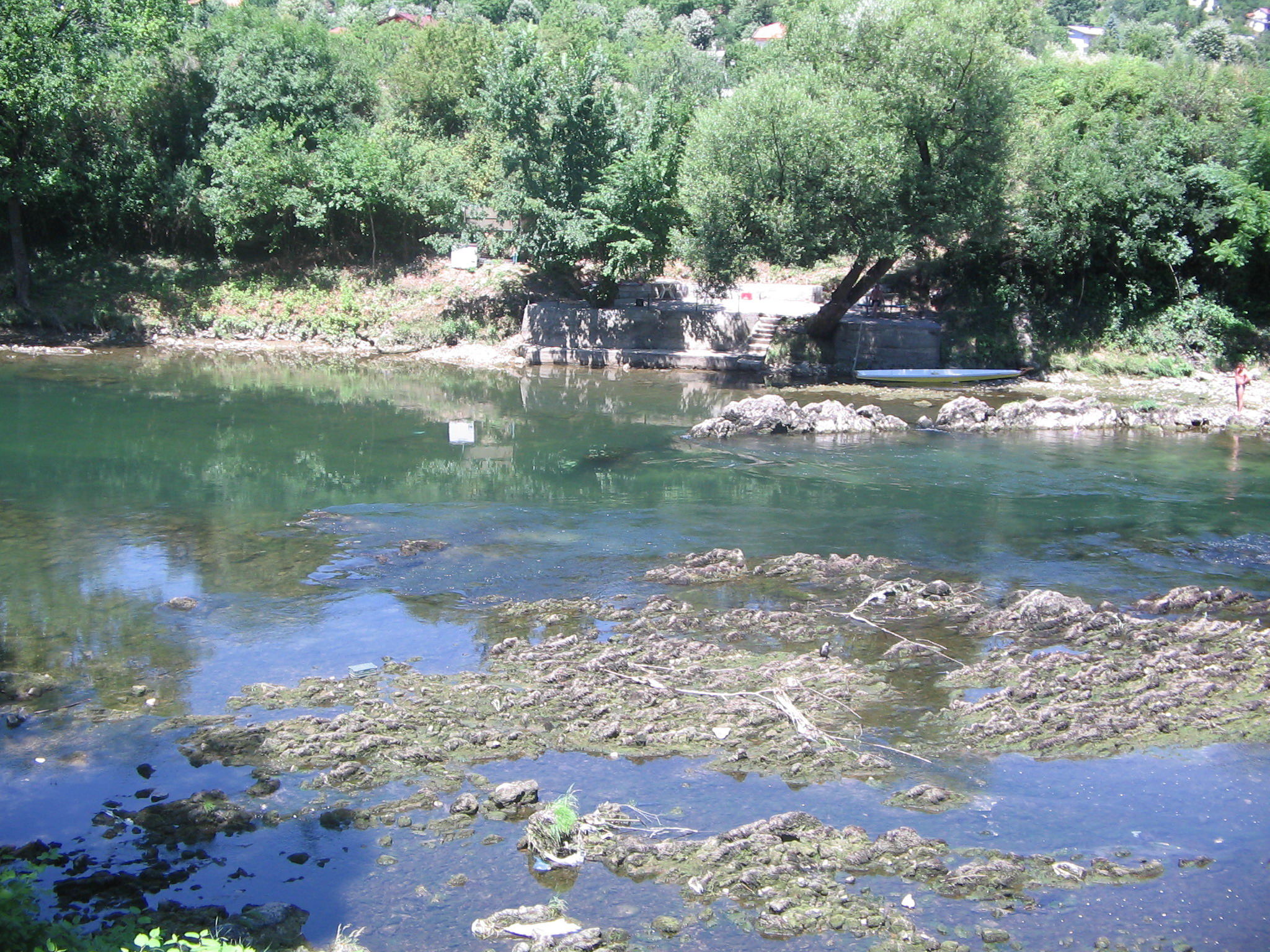

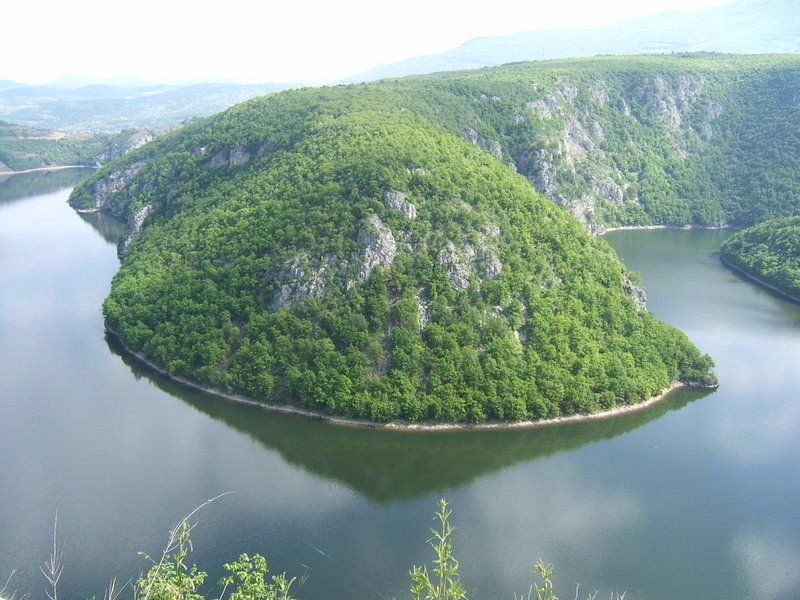
The river

== See also ==
- List of rivers of Bosnia and Herzegovina
- Vrbas Oblast
