= Previle (former municipality) =

Location of the former municipality of Previle on modern map of Bosnia and Herzegovina

Previle (Serbian Cyrillic: Превиле) was a municipality of the former Kotor-Varoš srez in the Banja Luka okrug, in former Yugoslavia (the Kingdom of Yugoslavia and FPR Yugoslavia), that existed until 1955. Today, the former municipality constitutes the territory of the villages of Boljanići, Hadrovci, Jakotina, Ravne, Sokoline, Vagani, Varjače, Viševice, Vranić, located in the Kotor Varoš municipality, and Javorani, located in the Kneževo/Skender Vakuf municipality. It had a Serb ethnic majority according to the 1953 census. It was a site of military operations during World War II.

According to the 1953 census, the 4,576 inhabitants identified ethnically as:

- Serbs – 3.537
- Croats – 696
- Yugoslavs “undecided” – 341
- Others – 1
