= Kotor-Varoš (srez) =

District in Yugoslavia

Kotor-Varoš was a srez (a second-level administrative unit) centered at Kotor Varoš, that existed during the Kingdom of Yugoslavia and Socialist Yugoslavia. It had earlier been a kreis of Austro-Hungarian Bosnia and Herzegovina. It was a subdivision of the Vrbas Oblast in 1922–29, Vrbas Banovina in 1929–41, and thereafter the Socialist Republic of Bosnia and Herzegovina. It was abolished in 1955.

In 1948 and 1953, it included the six municipalities of Kotor Varoš, Previle, Skender Vakuf, Šiprage, Vrbanjci and Zabrđe.

== Demographics ==
1953

Census area	Total	Serbs	Croats	Slovenians	Macedonians	Montenegrins	Yugoslavs undecided	Czechs	Poles	Rusyns –Ukrainians	Other Slavs	Other non-Slavs
KOTOR VAROŠ COUNTY	37898	25008	6485	4	4	10	6375	2	–	2	–	8
Kotor Varoš	4715	805	2640	2	3	6	1253	1	–	1	–	4
Maslovare	4574	3966	8	–	–	–	600	–	–	–	–	–
Preville	4576	3537	696	–	–	–	342	–	–	–	–	1
Skender Vakuf	7100	6566	16	–	–	–	518	–	–	–	–	–
Šiprage	7746	6036	24	1	1	–	1682	–	–	–	–	2
Vrbanjci	4919	1678	1728	1	–	4	1505	1	–	1	–	1
Zabrđe	4268	2420	1373	–	–	–	475	–	–	–	–	–
