= Kruševica (river) =

River in Bosnia and Herzegovina

- Location within Bosnia and Herzegovina
- Native name: Крушевица (Bosnian)

Location
- Country: Bosnia and Herzegovina

Physical characteristics
- Source
  - location: Slopes Očauš – Borja
  - coordinates: 44.533574°N 17.594193°E
  - elevation: 910 m (2,990 ft)
- Mouth
  - location: Vrbanja
  - coordinates: 44.558552°N 17.477833°E
  - elevation: 350 m (1,150 ft)
- Length: 14 km (8.7 mi)

Basin features
- Progression: Vrbanja→ Vrbas→ Sava→ Danube→ Black Sea

Kruševica is the strongest right tributary of Vrbanja in central Bosnia. It rises from two streams (Vilenski and Grebenski potok = Fairy's and Reefs stream) whose source is on the northeast slopes of the Očauš Mountain (at around 950 above sea level). The source is exposed to the Borja Mountain. On geographic maps, Kruševica is often marked as another river (Bobovica), whose estuary is around 20 miles upstream.

The significant right tributaries are Diklanski and Veliki Breski stream, Mali Mrđin stream, Sirovac, Uzlomac, Slatki potok (Sweet stream) and Rasova, and left: Stevanovina, Veliki Jankovac, Đukin do, Lauška rivers and Vaganjski stream. On them (up to 1960s) was even about 40 mills. In the southern mountain range Rogljuša – Trnjić's fields - Plane is the watershed of Krusevice and Maljevska River (also Vrbanja's tributaries), and in the north-chain: Omac – Jezero (Lake) – Gajevi (Groves) its watershed with Usora river (basin of Bosnia). Kruševica flows through Maslovare, and into the Vrbanja river which flows in the Obodnik, where the local road for Šiprage exits from the main road M-4 (Banja Luka – Doboj).

== See also ==
- Kotor Varoš
