= Zabrđe, Kotor Varoš =

Zabrđe
- Location in Bosnia and Herzegovina
- Coordinates: 44°39′10″N 17°21′35″E
- Country: Bosnia and Herzegovina
- Entity: Republika Srpska
- Municipality: Kotor Varoš
- Elevation: 292 m (958 ft)

Population
  - Total: 611

Zabrđe is a populated place in the Kotor Varoš municipality of central Republika Srpska, Bosnia and Herzegovina. It was one of six municipalities in former Kotor-Varoš County.

== Population ==
Zabrđe; Census 2013: Total of 611 inhabitants.
| Census Year | 1991 | 1981 | 1971 |
|---|---|---|---|
| Croats | 1,129 (97.83%) | 944 (93.37%) | 849 (96.36%) |
| Serbs | 9 (0.77%) | 20 (1.97%) | 20 (2.27%) |
| Bosniaks | 1 (0.08%) | 1 (0.09%) | 2 (0.22%) |
| Yugoslavs | 6 (0.51%) | 19 (1.87%) | 0 |
| Others and unknown | 9 (0.77%) | 27 (2.67%) | 10 (1.13%) |
| Total | 1,154 | 1,011 | 881 |

=== Municipality populations of Kotor Varoš County, 1953 ===
| Census area | Total | Serbs | Croats | Slovenians | Macedonians | Crnogorci | Yugoslavs undecided | Czechs | Poljaci | Resins – Ukrainians | Other Slavs | Other Non-Slavs |
| Kotor Varoš | 37898 | 25008 | 6485 | 4 | 4 | 10 | 6375 | 2 | – | 2 | – | 8 |
| Kotor Varoš | 4715 | 805 | 2640 | 2 | 3 | 6 | 1253 | 1 | – | 1 | – | 4 |
| Maslovare | 4574 | 3966 | 8 | – | – | – | 600 | – | – | – | – | – |
| Previle | 4576 | 3537 | 696 | – | – | – | 342 | – | – | – | – | 1 |
| Skender Vakuf | 7100 | 6566 | 16 | – | – | – | 518 | – | – | – | – | – |
| Šiprage | 7746 | 6036 | 24 | 1 | 1 | – | 1682 | – | – | – | – | 2 |
| Vrbanjci | 4919 | 1678 | 1728 | 1 | – | 4 | 1505 | 1 | – | 1 | – | 1 |
| Zabrđe | 4268 | 2420 | 1373 | – | – | – | 475 | – | – | – | – | – |

== See also ==
- Kotor Varoš
- Vrbanja
