= Maslovare, Kotor Varoš =

Maslovare
- Village
- Location within Republika Srpska Location within Bosnia and Herzegovina
- Coordinates: 44°33′56″N 17°32′01″E
- Country: Bosnia and Herzegovina
- Entity: Republika Srpska
- Municipality: Kotor Varoš
- Time zone: UTC+1 (CET)
  - Summer (DST): UTC+2 (CEST)

Maslovare (Serbian Cyrillic: Масловаре) is a village in the central Bosnia, Bosnia and Herzegovina, Republika Srpska, Kotor Varoš Municipality.

== Geography ==
Maslovare is the administrative center of the Local Community. It is located on the river Kruševica, below the eastern slopes of the mountain Borja (1,077 m), at 400–418 meters above sea level. From the north are the slopes of Uzlomac (1,018 m) Mountain, from the east – Rađeno brdo (967 m), west - Bodnjički Vis. On the south, Krusevica and Vrbanja river vallies there are the slopes of mountains chain Čemernica – Vlasic (Borci, 814 m). Bodnjički Vis (641 m) spreads from the mouth of Krusevice into Vrbanja to the mouth Jezerka in the same river. On it is a contemporary TV repeater of BHT.

Through Maslovare passes the road Banja Luka – Kotor Varoš – Teslić – Matuzići – Doboj, where this communication comes to M-17 (as Corridor Vc). In this village hall (in the Obodnik ) is the exit of local roads for Šiprage and Kruševo Brdo. The distance to Banja Luka is around 53 km.

== Population ==
Maslovare
Census Year	1991	1981	1971
Serbs	2,208 (96.67%)	2,190 (99.27%)	1,983 (98.69%)
Croats	12 (0.52%)	2 (0.09%)	3 (0.14%)
Moslems	0	3 (0.13%)	8 (0.39%)
Yugoslavians	35 (1.53%)	8 (0.36%)	4 (0.19%)
Others and unknown	29 (1.26%)	3 (0.16%)	13 (0.64%)
Total	2,284	2,206	2,011

=== Municipality populations of Kotor Varoš County, 1953 ===
Census area	Total	Serbs	Croats	Slovenians	Macedonians	Crnogorci	Yugoslavs undecided	Czechs	Poljaci	Resins – Ukrainians	Other Slavs	Other Non-Slavs
KOTOR VAROŠ COUNTY	37898	25008	6485	4	4	10	6375	2	–	2	–	8
Kotor Varoš	4715	805	2640	2	3	6	1253	1	–	1	–	4
Maslovare	4574	3966	8	–	–	–	600	–	–	–	–	–
Previle	4576	3537	696	–	–	–	342	–	–	–	–	1
Skender Vakuf	7100	6566	16	–	–	–	518	–	–	–	–	–
Šiprage	7746	6036	24	1	1	–	1682	–	–	–	–	2
Vrbanjci	4919	1678	1728	1	–	4	1505	1	–	1	–	1
Zabrđe	4268	2420	1373	–	–	–	475	–	–	–	–	–

== Notable people ==
Nevenka Petrić (1927–2015), writer, educationalist and expert for family planning and gender issues.

== Sources ==
- Book: "Nacionalni sastav stanovništva - Rezultati za Republiku po opštinama i naseljenim mjestima 1991.", statistički bilten br. 234, Izdanje Državnog zavoda za statistiku Republike Bosne i Hercegovine, Sarajevo.
- Internet - Source: "Popis po mjesnim zajednicama" - https://web.archive.org/web/20131005002409/http://www.fzs.ba/Podaci/nacion%20po%20mjesnim.pdf
- Mape, aerodromi i vremenska situacija lokacija (-{Fallingrain}-)
- http://www.maplandia.com/bosnia-and-herzegovina/republika-srpska/maslovare-44-33-56-n-17-32-1-e/ Google satelitska mapa
