= Jakotina =

Jakotina - Јакотина Jakotina
- Village
- Location in Bosnia and Herzegovina
- Coordinates: 44.5897°N 17.3344°E
- Country: Bosnia and Herzegovina
- Entity: Republika Srpska
- Municipality: Kotor Varoš
- Lowest elevation: 660 m (2,170 ft)

Population (1991)
  - Total: 649
- Time zone: Central European
- Postal code: ++387 (051)

Jakotina (Serbian Cyrillic: Јакотина) is a village in Central Bosnia, Kotor-Varoš Munuicipality, Bosnia and Herzegovina. In the Census year of 1991, 694 inhabitants lived in Jakotina.

== Geography ==
Jakotina is situated on regional road Kotor-Varoš – Skender Vakuf, abow Jakotina river, left tributary of Vrbanja river, with elevation of about 490 m. Below the village, there is a canyon of the Jakotina river, and on the opposite riverside there is a destroyed village, Sokoline.

According to the present situation, it can be concluded that it is the former village, because it was completely destroyed in the Bosnian War in 1992. In 2013 the village registered only 25 inhabitants, which is less than 4% of the population in 1991 (694).

== History ==
Until 1955, Jakotina belonged to the former Previle Municipality, Kotor Varoš.

A regional church dedicated to Sveti Ilija (Council Elijah the prophet), was built in Jakotina from 1981 to 1984. In 1992, after shelling by (para)military forces of Republika Srpska, it was almost completely destroyed, but the local population was expelled. Rebuilding work began in 2003; the church exterior is now mostly restored. Returning the local population is very slow and difficult. The local Population in Jakotina after war is 0, nobody lives in Jakotina! The Serbs destroyed Houses and any Infrastructure in Jakotina.

== Population ==
Jakotina
Census Year	1991.	1981.	1971.
Croats	520 (74.92%)	605 (69.86%)	660 (74.66%)
Serbs	172 (24.78%)	254 (29.33%)	220 (24.88%)
Bosniaks	0	7 (0.80%)	0
Yugoslavs	0	0	2 (0.22%)
Others and unknown	2 (0.28%)	0	2 (0,22%)
Total	694	866	884

== See also ==
- Jakotina river
- Kotor-Varoš
