= Kotor (disambiguation) =

Kotor is a coastal town in Montenegro.

Kotor or KOTOR may also refer to:

- Kotor (Bosnia), also known as Kotorgrad (Kotor town), a medieval fortress above the settlement of Kotor in Kotor Varoš, Bosnia and Herzegovina
- Kotor Municipality, a municipality in Montenegro with its administrative center in Kotor
- KOTOR (alternatively KotOR), an abbreviation for Star Wars: Knights of the Old Republic, a multimedia project
  - Star Wars: Knights of the Old Republic (video game), the series’ first installment
  - Star Wars: Knights of the Old Republic (comics), a tie-in comic book series
- Kotor-class frigate, light frigates built for the Yugoslav Navy during the 1980s

== See also ==
- Bay of Kotor, Adriatic bay named after the town of Kotor
- Kotor Varoš or Kotor-Varoš, a town and municipality located in northwestern Republika Srpska, Bosnia and Herzegovina
