= Bilice =

Bilice can refer to one of the following places:

Croatia

- Bilice, Požega-Slavonia County
- Bilice, Šibenik-Knin County
- Bilice, Split, a part of Mejaši, a section of Split, Croatia

Bosnia and Herzegovina

- Bilice, Kotor Varoš
