= Cvrcka =

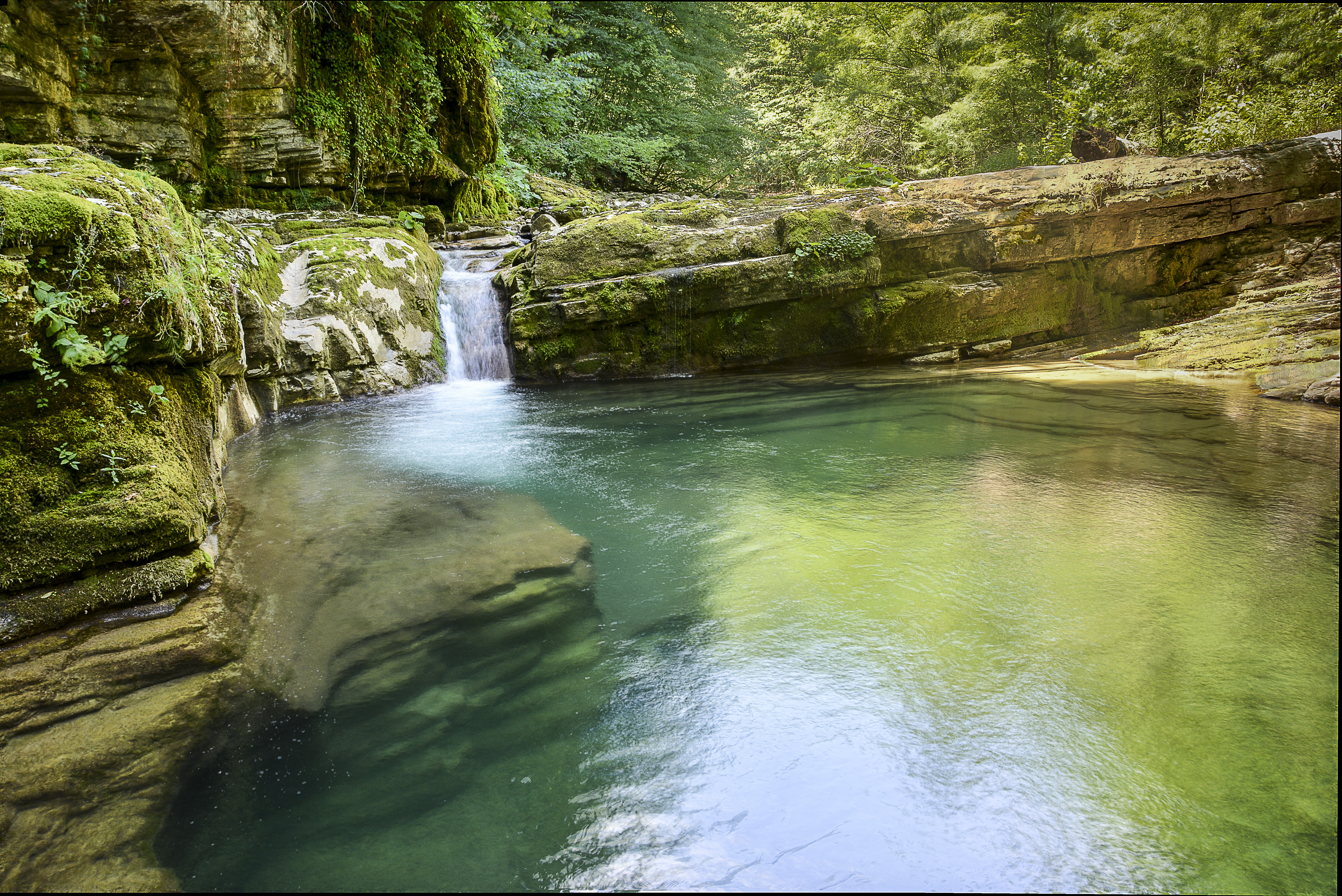

- Location within Bosnia and Herzegovina
- Native name: Цврцка (Serbian)

Location
- Country: Bosnia and Herzegovina

Physical characteristics
- Source
  - location: Čemernica
  - coordinates: 44.518282°N 17.341568°E
  - elevation: 1,200 m (3,900 ft)
- Mouth
  - location: Vrbanja (Večići–Vrbanjci)
  - coordinates: 44.518139°N 17.341268°E
  - elevation: 350 m (1,150 ft)
- Length: 12 km (7.5 mi)

Basin features
- Progression: Vrbanja→ Vrbas→ Sava→ Danube→ Black Sea

The Cvrcka (Serbian Cyrillic: Цврцка) is a river which flows through Bosnia, and is the largest left bank tributary of the river Vrbanja.

It rises on the northern slopes of Čemernica, on the same drainage divide as the Jakotina, another tributary of the same river, and the streams that flow into the Ugar. It is formed by two rivers: Međurača (source at about 1,200 m) and Vukača (source at about 1,150 m). Its estuary is between Večići and Vrbanjci (310 m above sea level).

== See also ==
- Kotor Varoš
