= Hrvaćani, Kotor Varoš =

Hrvaćani Хрваћани
- Village
- Location in Bosnia and Herzegovina Hrvaćani (Bosnia and Herzegovina)
- Coordinates: 44°36′24″N 17°27′48″E
- Country: Bosnia and Herzegovina
- Entity: Republika Srpska
- Municipality: Kotor Varoš
- Lowest elevation: 470 m (1,540 ft)

Population (Census 1991)
  - Total: 745
  - Summer (DST): Central European time
- Zip code: 387
- Area code: 051

Hrvaćani (Serbian Cyrillic: Хрваћани) is a village in the Kotor Varoš municipality, Republika Srpska entity, Bosnia and Herzegovina. The center of the settlement is at an altitude of 470 m. Along the village, in the direction northeast–southwest, flows the Hrvaćanska river, a right tributary of the Vrbanja river. Its mouth is below the village Dabovci.

According to 2013 preliminary data of the first post-war census, 429 inhabitants were registered.

== History ==
The word Hrvaćani in Bosnia was used in olden times as another term for Serbs of Croatia. The name thus denotes a settlement settled and established by Orthodox Serbs from the territory of Croatia.

During World War II, the village was a site of Yugoslav Partisan operations. The village was taken by the Chetniks at one point.

During the Bosnian War (1991–95), Hrvaćani was a site of atrocities against the Bosniak population, covered in several indictments and convictions at the Hague Tribunal. Locals were tortured, murdered and persecuted, estates were destroyed. Locals first fled to Večići, and then, together with other refugees in the region, went further or were transferred to the camp which was in Elementary School in Grabovica, where they disappeared without a trace.

== Sports ==
The association football club Ravnogorac plays in the Republika Srpska League.

== Population ==
Hrvaćani
Census year	1991.	1981.	1971.
Bosniaks	480 (64.42%)	400 (54.27%)	330 (34.41%)
Serbs	265 (35.57%)	316 (42.87%)	445 (46.40%)
Croats	0	20 (2.71%)	176 (18.35%)
Yugoslavs	0	1 (0.13%)	7 (0.72%)
Other and Unknown	0	0	1 (0.10%)
Total	745	737	959
