= Prisočka =

Prisočka – Присочка
- Village
- Location in Bosnia and Herzegovina
- Coordinates: 44.44°N 17.58°E
- Country: Bosnia and Herzegovina
- Entity: Republika Srpska
- Municipality: Kotor Varoš
- Highest elevation: 1,129 m (3,704 ft)
- Lowest elevation: 1,100 m (3,600 ft)
  - Rank: 1.423
- Area code: +387 (51)

Prisočka (Присочка) is populated place in Bosnia and Herzegovina, Republika Srpska, Kotor Varoš Municipality.

The administrative area of Prisočka includes the villages: Vrevići, Sipići, Zuhrići (image), Ćorkovići, Vrbovo, Pajići, Lozići, Fodlovići, Crepovi, Durakovići, Tuleža, Kovačevići, and Palivuk.

- A village in Prisočka: Zuhrići (at the hill)

== Population ==
Prisočka; Census 2013: Total of 294 citizens
Census Year	1991.	1981.	1971.
Bosniaks	1.394 (97,96%)	1.329 (79,67%)	1.062 (68,69%)
Serbs	0	310 (18,58%)	481 (31,11%)
Croats	0	0	1 (0,06%)
Yugoslavs	26 (1,82%)	15 (0,89%)	2 (0,12%)
Other and unknown	3 (0,21%)	14 (0,83%)	0
Total	1.423	1.668	1.546

== See also ==
- Šiprage
