= Vrbanjci =

- Village
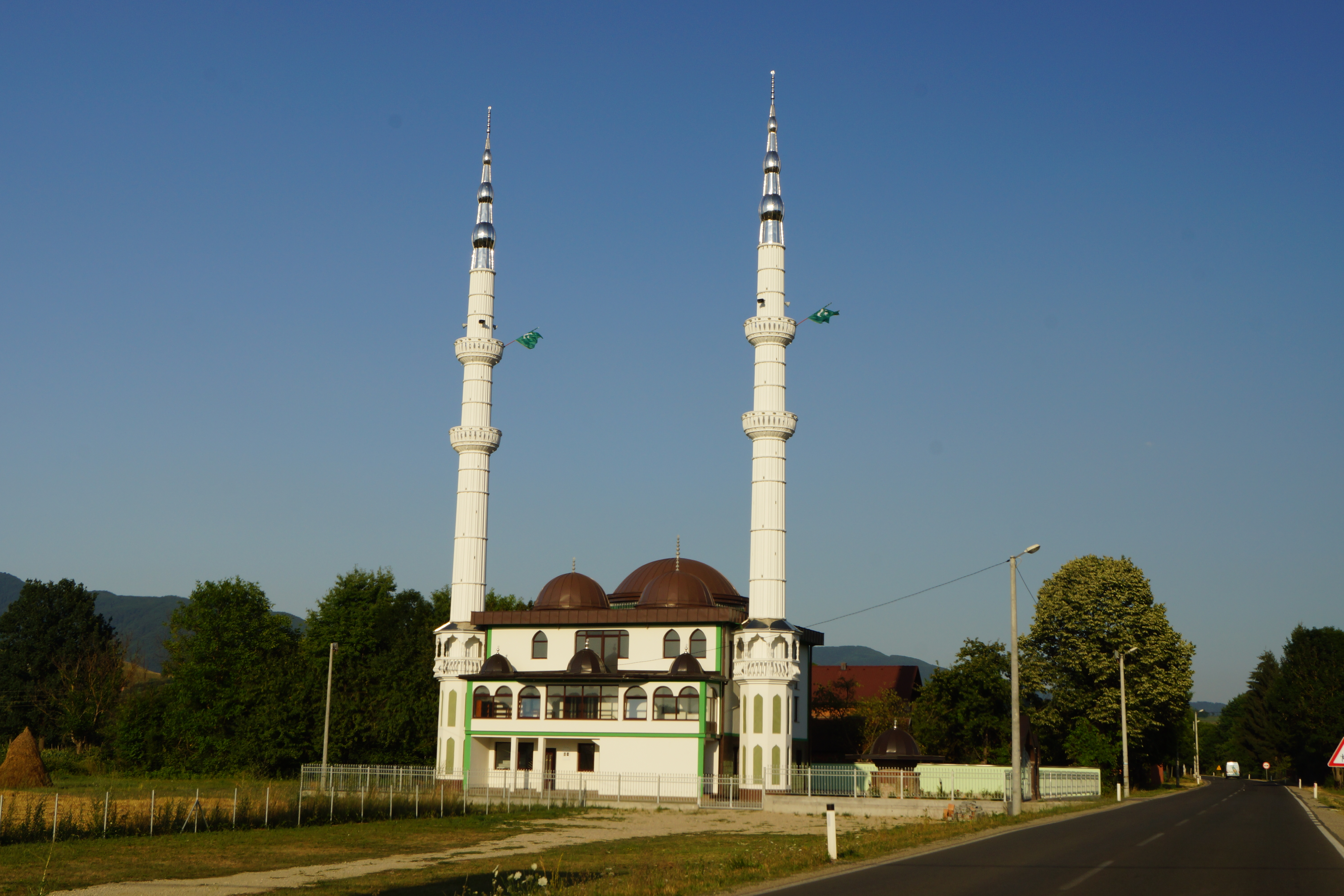

- Location in the Republic of Bosnia and Herzegovina
- Coordinates: 44°35′15″N 17°25′55″E
- Country: Bosnia and Herzegovina
- Postal code: ++387 051

Vrbànjci (Serbian Cyrillic: Врбањци) is a village in Bosnia and Herzegovina, , in the Municipality of Kotor Varoš.

== Geography ==
Vrbanjci lies along the Vrbanja river (after which it is named), between its tributaries Jezerka, Bosanka, and Cvrcka. Vrbanjci was formerly known as Plitska. This name was given to the village when the largest part of the settlement was situated near Bosanka (Plitka Rika, Shallow River). On this toponym there is a neighboring village named Plitska, almost forgotten since its destruction in 1992.

The intensive colonization of the fields surrounding the Vrbanja river occurred during the construction of a narrow-rails railway and the regional road in the direction of Šiprage and Maslovare, i.e. Teslić to Doboj. Vrbanjci was once a separate municipality (to 1964th) in the former County of Kotor Varoš.

== History ==
The history of this area commemorates the battle on The Field of Večići, approximately Mlâvâ locality, on the Vrbanja river, where was the clash between the Ottomans army and repressed pro Bosnian forces, from almost the entire State of Bosnia. Legend of there slayed brothers (shahids), who while dead carried their own heads is recounted until today. There is a turbeh, in the village of Večići in the memory. According to the historical context, it probably occurred around 1463, when Bosnia fell under Ottoman Administration.

During the World War II, this area was alternately ruled by partisans (the Third and Fourth Proletarian Brigade) and the German occupiers with the assistance of Ustasha and Chetniks. In the course of one such German occupation, all of inhabitants of Večići were arrested for the murder of two German soldiers 1942, for the murder of two German soldiers in the village of Staza, all of the inhabitants of Večići (village in Vrbanjci's local community) were arrested (1942). It is here also that toward end of the war, in the Partisans made preparations for the liberation of the Kotor Varoš. This town was one of the last strongholds of Ustasha and so called "home-defender"'s forces in Bosnia.

During the last War in Bosnia (1992–1995), Serb paramilitary and police forces have committed crimes against the civilian population in Vrbanjci and surrounding villages.

Most of the Bosniak population are back in their native lands and have restored their estates, with the assistance of the international community, but above all thanks to their own resources.

Since 1995, parents of Bosniak's pupils at the local Elementary school "Sveti Sava" have been running a lengthy court case to exercise their Constitutional right to teach in their native Bosnian language. Following a decade-long denial of the lawsuit at the Municipal Court in Kotor Varoš and the District Court in Banja Luka, the Constitutional Court of RS issued a verdict in their favor only in December 2019, obliging the defendant to reimburse all costs of the trial.

== Population ==
Vrbanjci
Census year	1991	1981	1971
Bosniaks	1.468 (49.34%)	487 (29.89%)	514 (31.07%)
Croats	799 (26.85%)	689 (42.29%)	651 (39.35%)
Serbs	658 (22.11%)	373 (22.89%)	473 (28.59%)
Yugoslavians	41 (1.37%)	79 (4.84%)	13 (0.78%)
Others and Unknown	9 (0.30%)	1 (0.06%)	3 (0.18%)
Total	2,975	1,629	1,654

=== Municipality populations of Kotor Varoš County, 1953 ===
Census area	Total	Serbs	Croats	Slovenians	Macedonians	Crnogorci	Yugoslavs undecided	Czechs	Poljaci	Resins – Ukrainians	Other Slavs	Other Non-Slavs
KOTOR VAROŠ COUNTY	37898	25008	6485	4	4	10	6375	2	–	2	–	8
Kotor Varoš	4715	805	2640	2	3	6	1253	1	–	1	–	4
Maslovare	4574	3966	8	–	–	–	600	–	–	–	–	–
Preville	4576	3537	696	–	–	–	342	–	–	–	–	1
Skender Vakuf	7100	6566	16	–	–	–	518	–	–	–	–	–
Šiprage	7746	6036	24	1	1	–	1682	–	–	–	–	2
Vrbanjci	4919	1678	1728	1	–	4	1505	1	–	1	–	1
Zabrđe	4268	2420	1373	–	–	–	475	–	–	–	–	–

== See also ==
- Vrbanja river
- Kotor Varoš
- Večići
