= Borja (mountain) =

Mountain in Bosnia and Herzegovina

Coordinates: 44.5300°N 17.7000°E

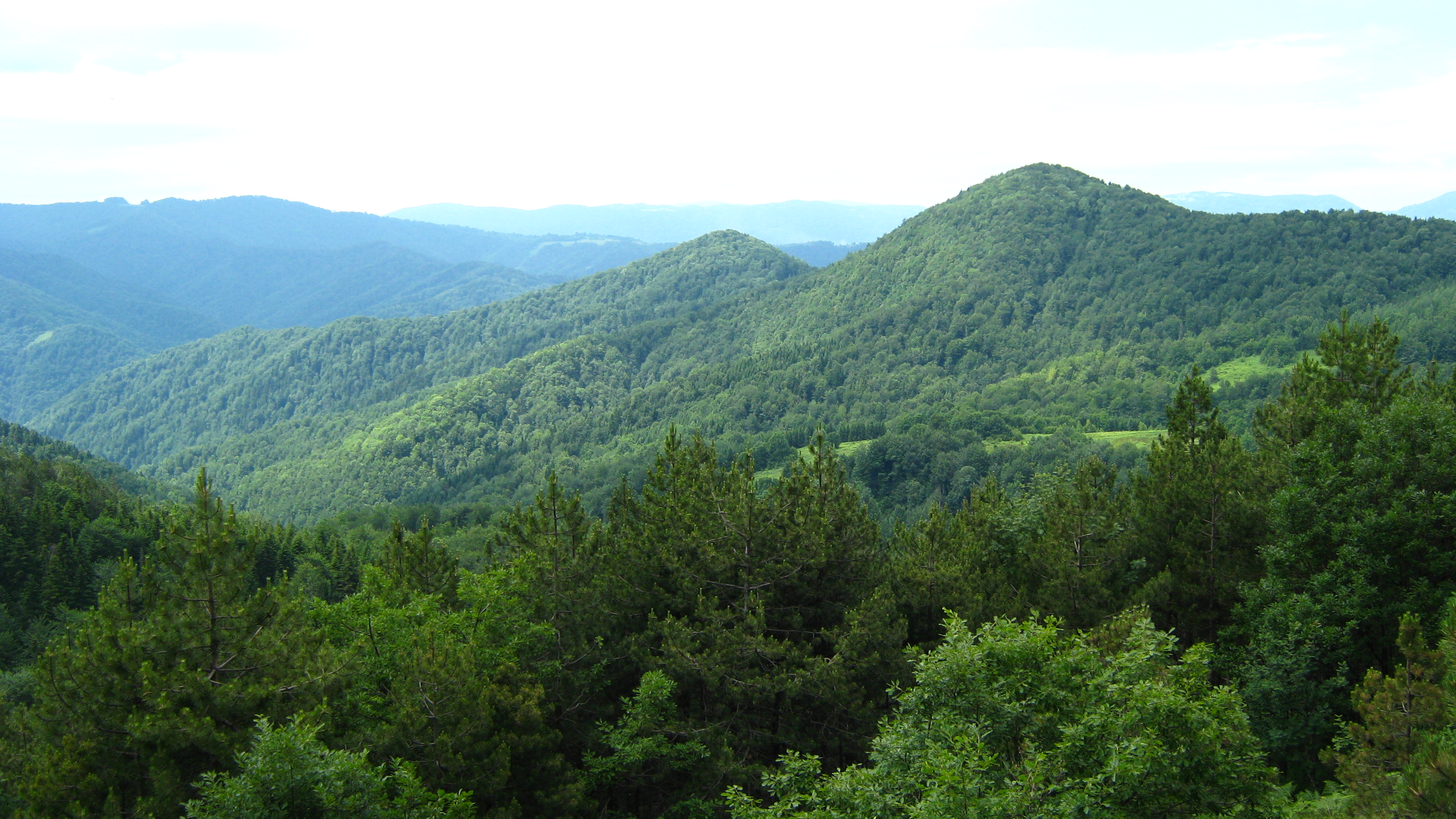
Borja Mountain (1,077 m)

Borja (1,077 metres (3,533 ft)) is a mountain in central Bosnia (Bosnia and Herzegovina), between the town of Teslić and the village of Maslovare. It spreads in the southeast – northwest, and from Uzlomac is divided on saddle Solila, through which passes main road M-4 (Banja Luka – Matuzići – Doboj, which exits on the M-17 (as corridor Vc). The biggest part of this mountain lies in the municipalities of Teslić and Kotor Varoš.

Over 1,000 meters above sea level at Borja are Runjavica (1,077 m), Pavlov vrh (Paul's peak, 1029 m), Komin (1,029 m) and Kuke (Hooks, 1.016 m). On the peaks of the mountain chain Očauš – Borja – Uzlomac is a watershed between basins of Bosnia and Vrbas.

Borja is rich in dense coniferous–deciduous forest communities. Dominant coniferous species are white and black pine, after which it was named (the name Borja can be roughly translated as "pine woods"). The dense forests are inhabited by many wild animals, including endemic Bosnian mammals.

The mountain is abundant with springs and streams. The best known spring is Hajdučke vode, located near the recreation center with the same name. There is a rich variety of minerals, of which only the coal was mined. The coal mine was opened in 1916 under Austro-Hungarian rule . It was closed during the 1950s.

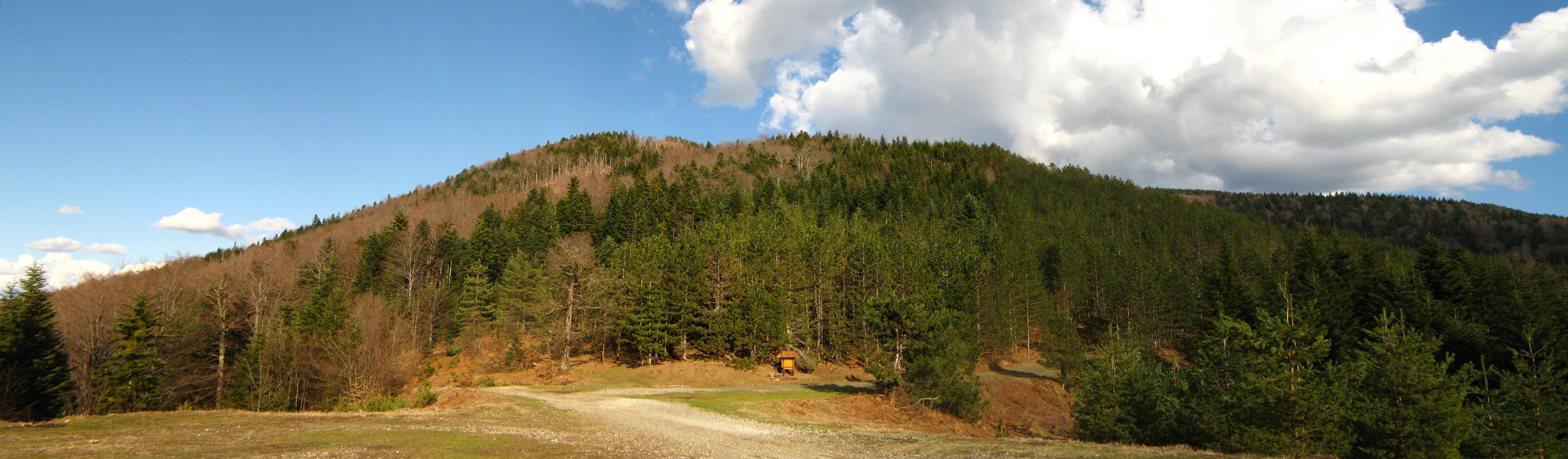
View to Runjavica, the highest point of Borja, from plateau Solila

== Flora and fauna ==
=== Fauna ===
In a two-year survey of the butterflies of Borja, 63 species were identified, representing 34% of all butterfly species ever identified in Bosnia and Herzegovina. However, due to the lack of research in the area, 36 species were registered at Borja for the first time. Species were found from the families Hesperiidae, Lycaenidae, Nymphalidae, Papilionidae, and Pieridae.

== See also ==
- Teslić
- Kotor Varoš
- Maslovare
- Obodnik
- Vrbanja (river)
