= Čemernica (Bosnia and Herzegovina) =

- Чемерница
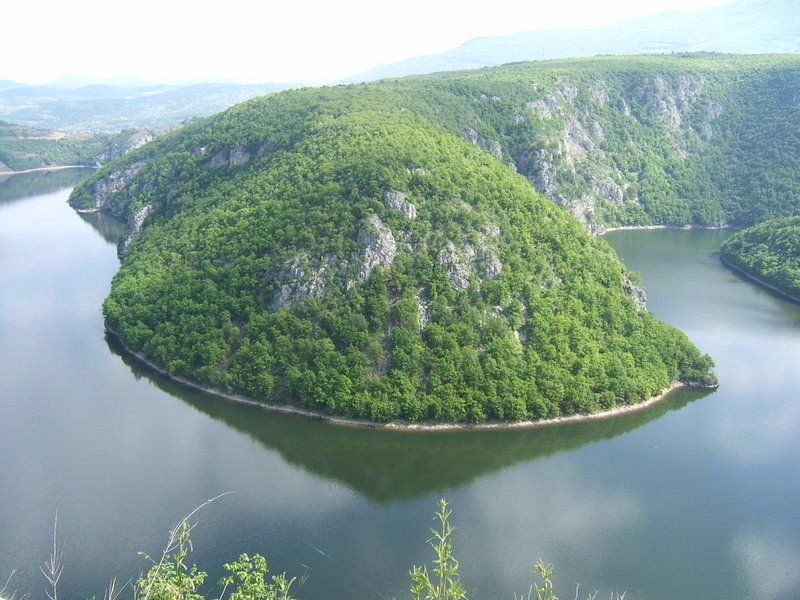
- Canyon of the Vrbas river at the slopes of Čemernica

Highest point
- Elevation: 1,338 m (4,390 ft)
- Coordinates: 44°31′00″N 17°13′41″E

Geography
- Location within Bosnia and Herzegovina
- Parent range: Dinaric Alps

Čemernica is a mountain in Central Bosnia, surrounded by the river Vrbas, and its confluences of Ugar and Vrbanja river. Čemernica's highest peak, Goli Vis, rises to an altitude of 1,338 meters. It is located south of Banja Luka, in the areas which connect the municipalities of Mrkonjić Grad, Kneževo and Banja Luka. In its foothills are the cities of Kotor Varoš (in the northeast) and Kneževo (in the east), as well as the settlement of Bočac (in the west). It is possible to reach the peak of Goli Vis from the city of Kneževo by car (preferably an SUV due to the dirt road). Under its northern slopes there is hydroelectric power plant reservoir of "Bočac".

Along its southern slopes passes the regional road from Banja Luka to Travnik, as well as its branch from Kneževo to Imljani and Korićani (via Ilomska).

Čemernica is the source of many rivers, streams and creeks, and the largest waterways are Cvrcka and Jakotina. The sources of these rivers are on its southwestern slopes. It is rich in high-quality forest resources, especially coniferous and mixed (spruce - abies - beech) woods, with Bosnian endemic quarry mammals.

== See also ==
- Kneževo
- Ugar
- Ilomska
- Cvrcka
- Jakotina
