= Varjače =

Varjače – Варјаче
- Village
- Location in Bosnia and Herzegovina
- Country: Bosnia and Herzegovina
- Entity: Republika Srpska
- Municipality: Kotor Varoš

Population (2013)
  - Total: 97
- Time zone: Central European
- Area code: +387 (051)

Varjače (Serbian Cyrillic: Варјаче) is a settlement in the Kotor Varoš municipality, in the Republika Srpska entity of Bosnia and Herzegovina.

== History ==
Until 1955, Varjače belonged to the former Previle Municipality, Kotor Varoš.

== Population ==
Varjače
Census Year	2013	1991	1981	1971
Serbs		216 (99,54%)	227 (98,27%)	304 (99,35%)
Croats		–	2 (0,866%)	–
Bosniaks			1 (0,433%)	–
Others and unknown		1 (0,461%)	1 (0,433%)	2 (0,654%)
Total	97	217	231	306
