= Šibovi =

- Village
- Location in Bosnia and Herzegovina
- Coordinates: 44.644722°N 17.338333°E
- Country: Bosnia and Herzegovina
- Entity: Republika Srpska
- Municipality: Kotor Varoš

Population (1991)
  - Total: 671
  - Summer (DST): Central European

Šibovi (Serbian Cyrillic: Шибови) is a settlement in the Bosnia and Herzegovina, Republika Srpska entity, Kotor Varoš Municipality.

According to the data on Census Year of 1991, in this populated place lived 671 citizens.

== Population ==
Šibovi Population in 2013: Total 270 citizens.
| Census Year | 1991. | 1981. | 1971. |
|---|---|---|---|
| Croats | 640 (95,38%) | 417 (95,20%) | 390 (98,73%) |
| Serbs | 24 (3,57%) | 10 (2,28%) | 0 |
| Bosniaks | 0 | 2 (0,45%) | 0 |
| Yugoslavs | 5 (0,74%) | 8 (1,82%) | 0 |
| Other and unknown | 2 (0,29%) | 1 (0,22%) | 5 (1,26%) |
| Total | 671 | 438 | 395 |

== See also ==
- Kotor Varoš
