= Baština, Kotor Varoš =

Baština
- Location in Bosnia and Herzegovina
- Coordinates: 44°38′14″N 17°21′31″E
- Country: Bosnia and Herzegovina
- Entity: Republika Srpska
- Municipality: Kotor Varoš
- Elevation: 354 m (1,161 ft)

Population (2013)
  - Total: 196

Baština is a village in the Kotor Varoš Municipality of Bosnia and Herzegovina.

== Population ==
Baština Total population 2013: 196 citizens
Census Year	1991	1981	1971
Croats	443 (97,79%)	595 (98,51%)	519 (99,24%)
Serbs	1 (0,221%)	3 (0,497%)	1 (0,191%)
Bosniaks	–	2 (0,331%)	–
Yugoslavs	–	3 (0,662%)	
Others and unknown	6 (1,325%)	4 (0,662%)	3 (0,574%)
Total	450	607	523

== See also ==
- Kotor Varoš
