= Hadrovci, Kotor Varoš =

Hadrovci – Хадровци
- Village
- Location in Bosnia and Herzegovina
- Coordinates: 44.6153°N 17.3083°E
- Country: Bosnia and Herzegovina
- Entity: Republika Srpska
- Municipality: Kotor Varoš

Population (1991)
  - Total: 613
- Time zone: Central European
- Area code: +387 (051)

Hadrovci (Serbian Cyrillic: Хадровци) is a settlement in the Kotor Varoš Municipality, Republika Srpska entity, Bosnia and Herzegovina. According to the 2013 census the village had 181 inhabitants. Until 1955, Hadrovci belonged to the former Previle municipality.

== Population ==
Hadrovci; Census Year 2013: Total of 181 inhabitants
Census	1991.	1981.	1971.
Bosniaks	607 (99,02%)	578 (99,31%)	468 (94,16%)
Croats	3 (0,48%)	0	0
Serbs	2 (0,32%)	4 (0,68%)	29 (5,83%)
Yugoslavs	0	0	0
Others and unknown	1 (0,16%)	0	0
Total	613	582	497

== Sources ==
- Vojnogeografski institut, Izd. (1955): Prnjavor (List karte 1:100.000, Izohipse na 20 m). Vojnogeografski institut, Beograd.
- Mučibabić B., ed. (1998). Geografski atlas Bosne i Hercegovine. Sarajevo: Geodetski zavod BiH. ISBN 9958-766-00-0.
