= Duratovci =

Duratovci - Дуратовци
- Village
- Location in Bosnia and Herzegovina
- Coordinates: 44.6214°N 17.3503°E
- Country: Bosnia and Herzegovina
- Entity: Republika Srpska
- Municipality: Kotor Varoš
- Highest elevation: 287 m (942 ft)
- Lowest elevation: 260 m (850 ft)

Population (1991)
  - Total: 502
- Area code: +387 (051)

Duratovci is a village in Kotor-Varoš Municipality, Republika Srpska, Bosnia and Herzegovina.

In the census of 1991 the village had 502 residents.

== Population ==
Duratovci; Census Year 2013.: Total of 53 citizens
Census Year	1991.	1981.	1971.
Croats	445 (88,65%)	291 (100,0%)	259 (100,0%)
Bosniaks	42 (8,367%)	–	–
Serbs	6 (1,195%)	–	–
Yugoslavs	3 (0,598%)	–	–
Others and unknown	6 (1,195%)	–	–
Total	502	291	259

== See also ==
- Kotor Varoš
