= Jakotina (river) =

River in Bosnia and Herzegovina

- Location within Bosnia and Herzegovina
- Native name: Jakotina (Croatian)

Location
- Country: Bosnia and Herzegovina

Physical characteristics
- Source
  - location: Čemernica
  - coordinates: 44.525189°N 17.284900°E
- Mouth
  - location: Vrbanja river
  - coordinates: 44.612559°N 17.374192°E
- Length: 20 km (12 mi)

Basin features
- Progression: Vrbanja→ Vrbas→ Sava→ Danube→ Black Sea

The Jakotina (Serbian Cyrillic: Јакотина) is a left tributary of the Vrbanja river. It rises on the north-eastern slopes of the mountains Čemernica (at about 1,050 meters above sea level) in the area of Rađići village. This locality is above the regional road Banja Luka - Kneževo. The length of this river is about 20 kilometers. Along its course, in the 1970s there were at least 10 water-mills. Its mouth is in the Kotor Varoš, about 200 meters downstream from the old bazaar. After a watershed with the Cvrcka (also a tributary of Vrbanja), and tributaries of Ugar, Jakotina has a relatively short and deep canyon (depth of about 300 meters). The canyon spreads to the mouth Grabačevac, its richest tributary. Near Kotor Varoš there is also one small and one large waterfall (300 meters above sea level). Large waterfall is called "Bobas"; its height is about seven metres.

On the right slopes above the waterfall there is a source of drinking water that centuries has been connected with popular legends. Above Bobas, there are still remains of the city walls of the medieval town of Kotor (563 m). Up until the end of the World War II, the ruins of a fortress jails and staircase communication between them were preserved. The diameter of the bell on the tower was 5 meters. It is not preserved and the fort was abandoned today

During the War in Bosnia (1992-1995), the old bridge on Bobas was destroyed, but (after 1996) "renewed with the support of the European Union".

Along Jakotina there is regional road from Kotor Varoš to Kneževo, with access to the road to Travnik (alternative: over Ilomska or Ugar, and Banja Luka.

On Bobas, this river divides settlements Kotor (mostly Bosniaks) and Čepak (mostly Croatian). During the War in Bosnia 1992–1995, the inhabitants of these town were killed or displaced, as well as other Bosniaks and Croats citizens of the municipality of Kotor Varoš (1992). All non-Serbs settlements in the valley of Vrbanja were extremely devastated, from Kruševo Brdo to Banja Luka.

== See also ==
- Vrbanja river
- Kotor Varoš
