= Garići, Kotor Varoš =

Garići – Гарићи
- Village
- Location in Bosnia and Herzegovina
- Coordinates: 44.59°N 17.50°E
- Country: Bosnia and Herzegovina
- Entity: Republika Srpska
- Municipality: Kotor Varoš

Population (2013)
  - Total: 737
- Time zone: Central European
- Area code: +387 (051)

Garići (Serbian Cyrillic: Гарићи) is a settlement in the Bosnia and Herzegovina, Republika Srpska entity, Kotor Varoš Municipality. In the census year of 1991, in this village lived 1,341, and 2013: 737.

== Population ==
Ethnic Group	1991.	1981.	1971.
Bosniaks	987 (73.60%)	907 (69.71%)	759 (77.13%)
Serbs	344 (25.65%)	373 (28.67%)	207 (21.03%)
Croats	1 (0.07%)	2 (0.15%)	12 (1.21%)
Yugoslavians	4 (0.29%)	19 (1.46%)	5 (0.50%)
Others	5 (0.37%)	0	1 (0.10%)
Total	1.341	1.301	984
