= Maljeva =

Maljeva – Маљева
- Village
- Location in Bosnia and Herzegovina
- Coordinates: 44°31′11″N 17°30′13″E
- Country: Bosnia and Herzegovina
- Entity: Republika Srpska
- Municipality: Kotor Varoš
- Highest elevation: 660 m (2,170 ft)
- Lowest elevation: 620 m (2,030 ft)

Population (1991)
  - Total: 595
- Area code: +387 (051)

Maljeva is populated place in Kotor Varoš municipality, Republika Srpska, Bosnia and Herzegovina. In 1991, the population was 595, and the 2013 census counted 223 inhabitants.

== Population ==
Maljeva; Census Year 2013: Total of 223 residents.
Census Year	1991.	1981.	1971.
Serbs	585 (98,31%)	693 (99,71%)	918 (99,67%)
Croats	1 (0,16%)	1 (0,14%)	1 (0,10%)
Bosniaks	0	1 (0,14%)	0
Yugoslavs	2 (0,33%)	0	0
Others and unknown	7 (1,17%)	0	2 (0,21%)
Total	595	695	921
