= Orahova, Kotor Varoš =

Orahova
- Village
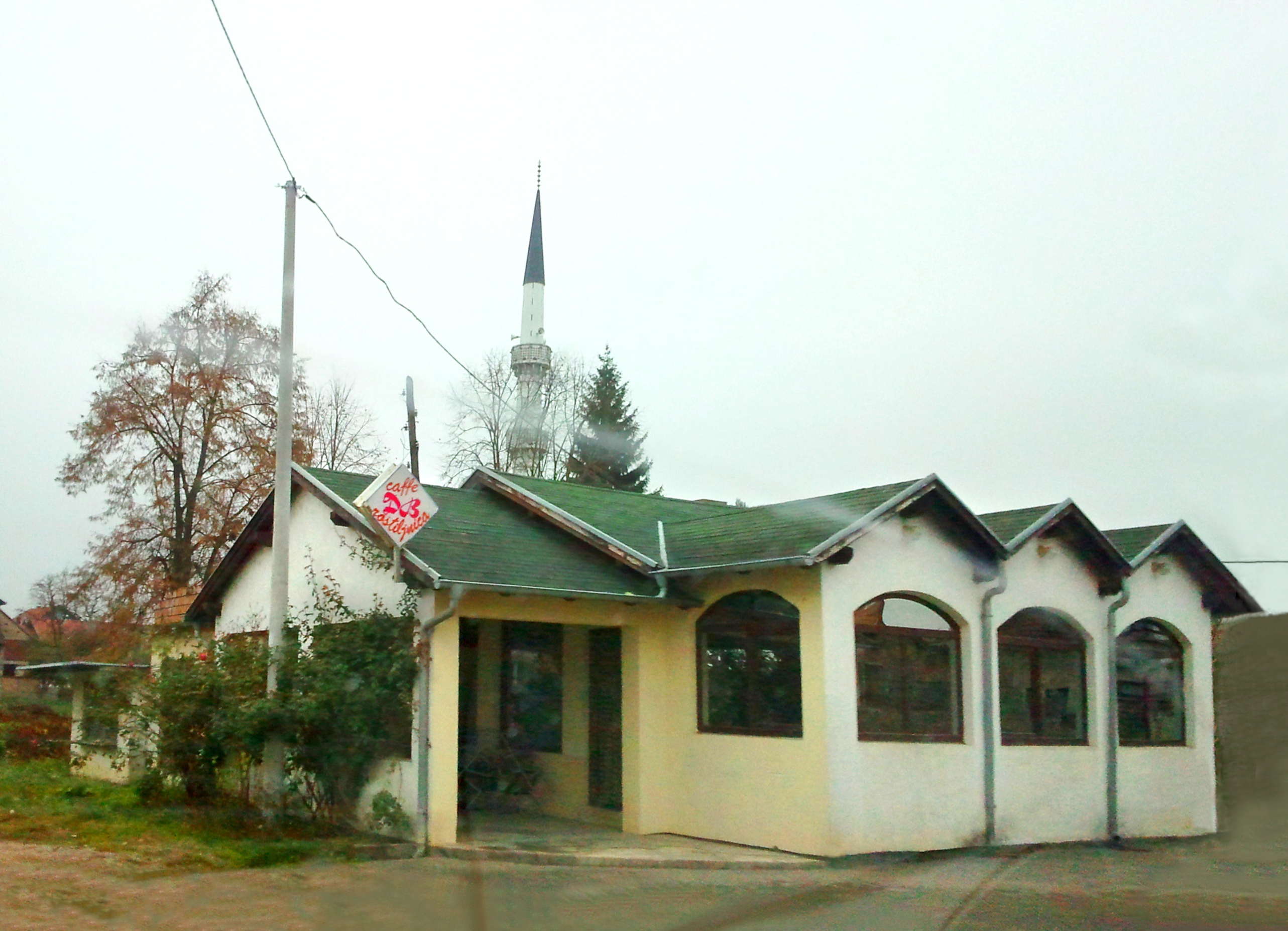
- Orahova

- Location in Bosnia and Herzegovina
- Coordinates: 44.5503°N 17.4492°E
- Country: Bosnia and Herzegovina
- Entity: Republika Srpska
- Municipality: Kotor Varoš
- Highest elevation: 540 m (1,770 ft)
- Lowest elevation: 315 m (1,033 ft)

Population (1991)
  - Total: 1,612
  - Summer (DST): Central European
- Area code: +387 (051)

Orahova (Serbian Cyrillic: Орахова) is populated place in Bosnia and Herzegovina, Republika Srpska, Kotor-Varoš Municipality. Orahova includes two hamlets: Gornja (Upper, 540 m) and Lower (350 m) Orahova.

The centerpiece of the new village is located on the river Vrbanja river with the mouth of its tributary Vigošća.

== History ==
During the Bosnian War, all Croat and Muslim villages in the area were destroyed, and residents killed and expelled. Today there is almost no Croat population left in the area.

== Population ==
Šiprage Total population 2013: 302
| Census Year | 1991. | 1981. | 1971. |
| Croats | 1 107 (68,67%) | 1 117 (68,95%) | 929 (66,31%) |
| Bosniaks | 294 (18,24%) | 249 (15,37%) | 201 (14,35%) |
| Serbs | 206 (12,78%) | 251 (15,49%) | 270 (19,27%) |
| Yugoslavs | – | 3 (0,185%) | – |
| Others and unknown | 5 (0,310%) | – | 1 (0,071%) |
| Total | 1,612 | 1,620 | 1,401 |
