= Nevenka Petrić =

Serbian writer, poet (1927–2015)

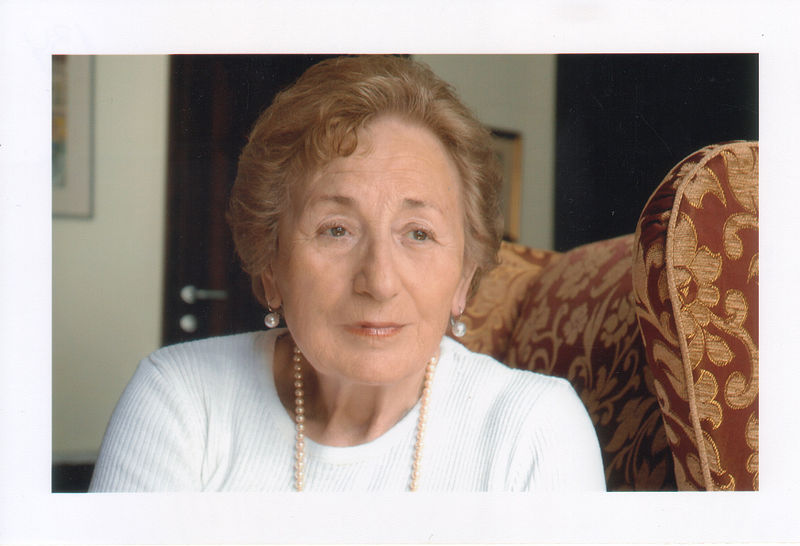
- Nevenka Petrić
- Born: Nevenka Petrić; 11 March 1927; Maslovare
- Died: 27 December 2015 (aged 88); Belgrade, Serbia
- Occupation: Writer
- Writing career
- Notable works: Kap rose na cvetku (“Drop of Dew on a Flower”); I zvijezde smo dosezali ("We Even Reached the Stars"), vols 1, 2 & 3 Sto pedeset godina moje porodice 1855 - 2005 ("One Hundred and Fifty Years of My Family 1855–2005")

Nevenka Petrić (11 March 1927, Maslovare – 27 December 2015 Belgrade) was a Serbian writer, poet, educationalist, and expert in the fields of family planning and gender relations. She joined the Partisans at the age of 14. She became a youth leader and then a head of Health and Social Policy in Yugoslavian local government. She was a member of the Yugoslav women's assembly, secretary of the Conference for Social Activity of Yugoslav Women (1961–69), and president of the Family Planning Council of Yugoslavia (1968–76). She represented Europe on the Central Council of the International Planned Parenthood Federation, and was president of that body's European committee for education. She assisted the United Nations Population Fund's research projects and also directed a UN course on gender relations and parenthood for students from developing countries.

Petrić has written many published works on family planning and gender relations, and has also written poetry published in four collections.

== Life and work ==
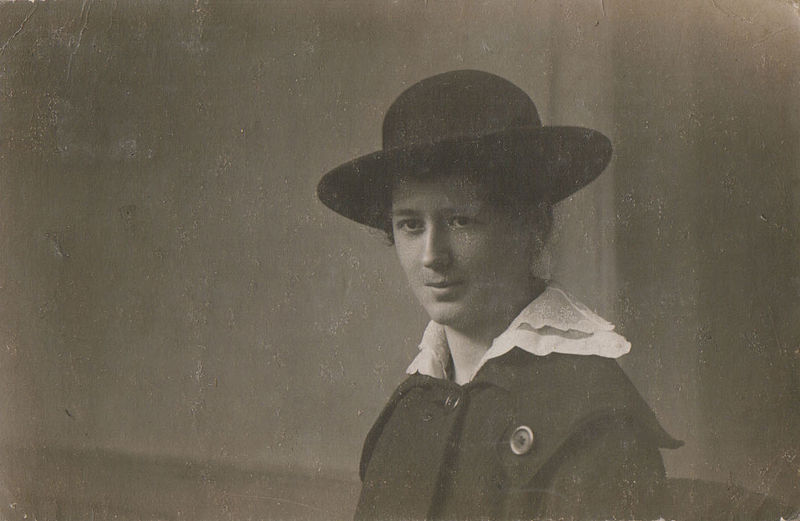
Nevenka's mother, Natalija Petrić née Popović, teacher, participant of the War of Liberation since 1941

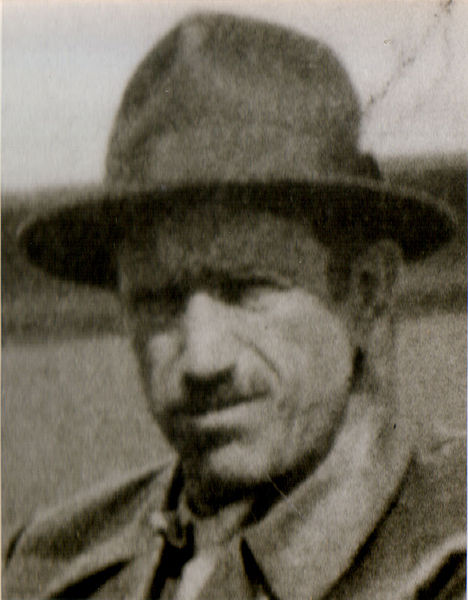
Nevenka's father, Vaso Petrić, merchant and mayor of Maslovare, local uprising organizer

Nevenka Petrić was born on 11 March 1927 at Maslovare (then Kingdom of Serbs, Croats and Slovenes, now Republika Srpska, Bosnia). After graduating from elementary school, Nevenka Petrić attended the Civic School for Girls in Banja Luka, but on the invasion of Yugoslavia on 6 April 1941, all schools in Yugoslavia stopped functioning, until after the liberation in 1945. Therefore, Nevenka's education was also interrupted. Nevenka's whole family joined the partisans in 1941, including then 14-year-old Nevenka. Nevenka died on 27 December 2015 in Belgrade, Serbia.

=== The War of Liberation 1941–1945 ===
During the War of Liberation in Yugoslavia (1941–1945), Nevenka Petrić was a fighter against the German occupiers and collaborators, and after a short while, she became the youth leader of her troop, battalion, unit, and later the Banja Luka district and the whole of central Bosnia. She was actively engaged in creating anti-fascist youth organizations in both free and occupied territories, among civilians and the army. There were two youth units in the beginning, in Banja Luka and Prnjavor, and later new units were created in central Bosnia—Vlašić, Travnik, Uzlomac, Doboj, Derventa, Tešanj and others, and significantly later central Bosnian brigades were formed: 14th, 18th and 19th. For her war service she received the Spomenica 1941 award and other medals and awards.

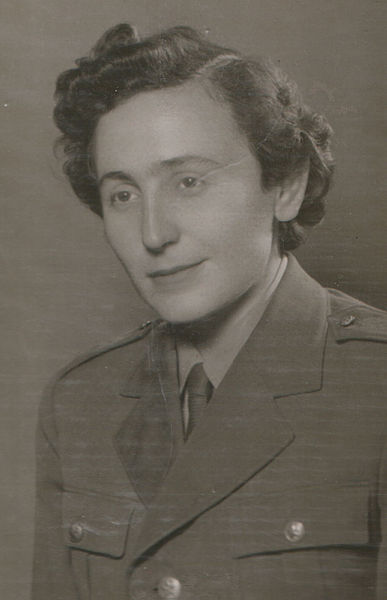
Nevenka Petrić, 1945

At the First District Conference of the Young Communist League of Yugoslavia for the Banja Luka district, Nevenka was elected the first president of the youth alliance USAOJ (United Alliance of the Anti-Fascist Youth of Yugoslavia) for the Banja Luka district. After some time, at the District Conference of Youth of Central Bosnia, held in Teslić in September 1944, she was also elected the president of youth (USAOJ) for the whole of central Bosnia.

This marks the beginning of Nevenka's political engagement, both among the youth living in central Bosnia and the military units which were being formed during the war in the central Bosnian regions of Banja Luka, Uzlomac Mountain, Motajica Mountain, Prnjavor, Vlašić Mountain, Srbac, Teslić/Tešanj and others.

Nevenka was heavily involved in organizing the Second Congress of USAOJ in Drvar on 2 – 4 May 1944, and led the anti-fascist youth delegation.

=== After the Liberation ===
Immediately upon liberation in spring 1945, Nevenka Petrić was assigned to work in the liberated city of Banja Luka. On 22 April 1945 she was appointed the first president of the youth of metropolitan Banja Luka, and soon after, she was elected to serve as the president of the District Council of USAOJ for the Banja Luka district. In 1949 she was appointed the organizational secretary and, after 1950, the president of the District Committee of People's Youth for Bosnian Krajina. While serving in this position, she was sent to Higher Political School in Belgrade (1951–1954), where she graduated with excellence. In 1954 she returned to Banja Luka and was appointed the Chief Officer for Health and Social Policy in the Banja Luka City Council. In 1956 she worked as the Chief Officer for Health and Social Policy in Stari Grad, one of the central municipalities of Belgrade.

=== Work at national level ===
Petrić was elected to the Assembly of Representatives of Women of all Republics and Autonomous Provinces of Yugoslavia, held in Zagreb on 2–4 May 1961, to serve as a secretary for the Conference for Social Activity of Yugoslav Women. She served two four-year terms in this position and worked intensively on international issues. In this period, Petrić was active in science and education, at both the regional and the state level.

In 1967 she was elected vice president for the Family Planning Council of Yugoslavia, and the following year she was elected the president for a four-year term, and after that, reelected to the same position for another four years.

=== International work ===
In her capacity as the president of the Planned Parenthood Council of Yugoslavia, Petrić carried out elective functions at both the European and international level in education and at Planned Parenthood. She was the Yugoslavian representative for this international organization in London. In that capacity, she was elected to serve as the president of the European Committee for Education of the International Planned Parenthood Federation and as a member of the relevant committee at the international level as a European representative. She was also a member of the Central Council of the International Planned Parenthood Federation, as a representative of Europe.

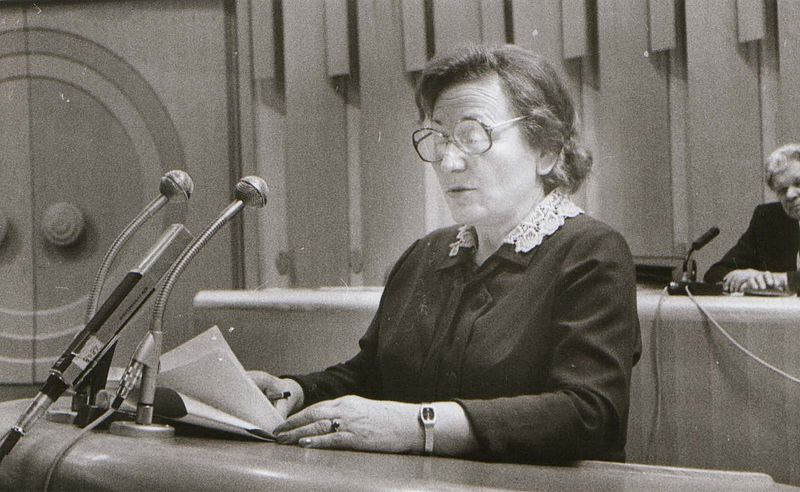
Dr. Nevenka Petrić gives one of many expert presentations related to planned parenthood and youth education

She was the director for the UN international course The Humanization of Relations Between the Sexes and Responsible Parenthood, affiliated to the Rector's Office of the Sarajevo University, from 1982 until 1992. Participants in this course came from developing countries and were selected and sent to attend the course by the institutions of their governments.

Nevenka Petrić was also an expert of the United Nations' Population Fund from 1982 until 1992. In this capacity, she was occasionally involved in implementation of certain scientific and research projects in India, Indonesia, Greece, Romania, and other countries.

=== Other activities ===
Petrić is a member of the Association of Writers of Serbia and Vice-President of the Association of Writers of Yugoslavia. She is also a member of the Committee for International Cooperation of the Republic SUBNOR (Union of Associations of Fighters in the War of Liberation 1941–1945) for Serbia.

== Education ==
Petrić graduated from the Faculty of Philosophy of the Belgrade University in 1963 as a part-time student. In 1987 she took a doctorate at the Faculty of Philosophy of Sarajevo University, submitting a thesis on human freedoms, birth and self-management.

== Bibliography ==
=== Academic and general ===
Nevenka Petrić published thirteen books, including one trilogy, We Even Reached the Stars (I, II and III) (1996). Also, a bibliography of Nevenka Petrić's publications over 50 years was published in 1997, titled Nevenka Petrić: Bibliography 1945–1995 (which included 893 works published in the above-mentioned period), as well as the book One Hundred and Fifty Years of My Family 1855–2005 (2006). Her doctoral thesis "Human Freedoms, Birth, Self-Management", which highlighted the constitutional human right to planned parenthood in Yugoslavia, was also published.

She also published three books in English:

- "The Human Right to Free Choice on Childbirth in the Social Federal Republic of Yugoslavia" (1945). This book was first published in English and served as crucial material for the state delegation of the Republic of Yugoslavia for the World Congress of Women, held under the auspices of the United Nations. Nevenka Petrić was a member of that delegation at the World Congress of Women, held in Mexico in 1975. After the conference, 500 more copies were published in Serbian.
- "The Integration of the Contents on Humanization of Relations between the Sexes and Responsible Parenthood into Curricula of Pedagogic and Psychological Disciplines for Training of Pedagogues, Psychologists and Teachers" (1980).
- "Children in Yugoslav Socialist Self-Management Society" (1980).

In addition Petrić was a co-author of 21 publications (12 in Serbian, one in Macedonian and one in English), as well as numerous studies and articles in both Serbian and foreign languages.

=== Poetry ===
Nevenka Petrić is also an author of four collections of poems:

- “I Searched for a Ray of Light with My Eyes” (1993), 57 pages, copyrighted issue
- “Inscription in the Wind" (1994), 65 pages, copyrighted issue
- “Spring Accords" (1994), 79 pages, copyrighted issues
- “Drop of Dew on a Flower” (1996)
