= Borci Donji =

- Village
- Location in Bosnia and Herzegovina
- Coordinates: 44°32′40″N 17°28′48″E
- Country: Bosnia and Herzegovina
- Entity: Republika Srpska
- Region: Banja Luka
- Municipality: Kotor Varoš

Population (1991)
  - Total: 419
- Postal code: 051
- Website: www.opstinakotorvaros.com

Borci Donji is a community in Kotor Varoš Municipality, Bosnia and Herzegovina.

== Population ==
=== Census 1991 ===
Ethnic group	No	%
Serbs	420	90.91
Moslems	39	8.44
Others	3	0.65

Note

The population census from 1971 and 1981 show the total population for the settlements Borci Donji and Borci Gornji.

== See also ==
- Kotor Varoš
