= Očauš =

Mountain in central Bosnia

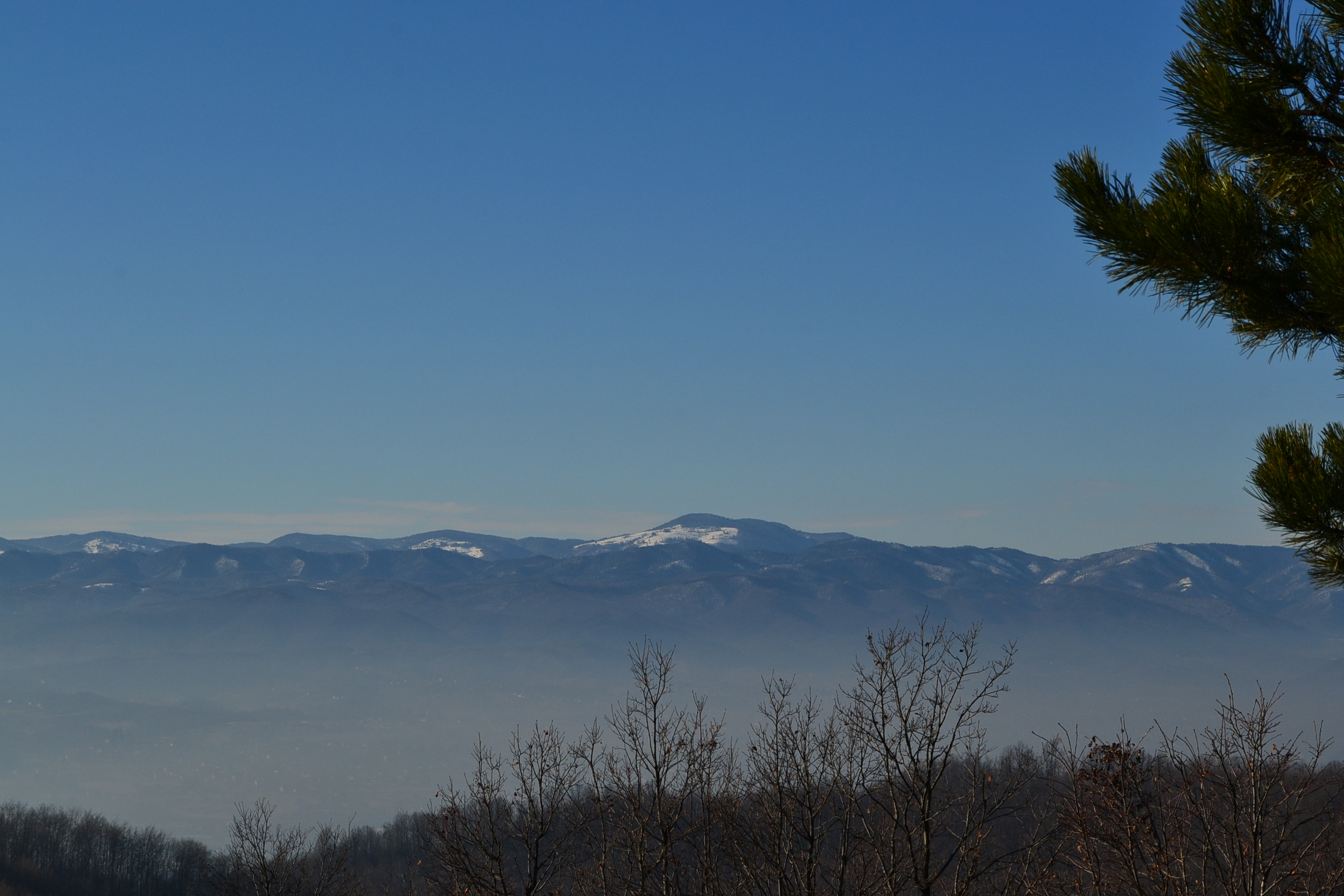
- Biser glavica

Highest point
- Elevation: 1,402 m (4,600 ft)
- Coordinates: 44°30′00″N 17°36′50″E

Geography
- Location within Bosnia and Herzegovina
- Location: Bosnia and Herzegovina
- Parent range: Dinaric Alps

Očauš is a mountain in central Bosnia, the majority in the municipalities of Kotor Varoš and Teslić, at an altitude of 1,402 meters (Mihailovac peak).

Očauš extends in the southeast - northwest, between the river basins of Vrbanja river and Ukrina. It is rich in forest goods and pastures. On this mountain the scattered villages and hamlets, including Upper Očauš, Lower Očauš, Mihajlovačka kosa, Tavani, Ðurđevac, Kilavac, Lepenica, Dolovi, Ceranska kosa, Počivala, Glavička kosa and Mosor.

Očauš is rich in water resources: water wells, streams and rivers, and most are: Očaušnica, Pecana, Kamenica, Stankovac, Vukulja, Kojvana, Stubo, Pavina Voda, Vrela, Jakuša, and Bukaljka.

== See also ==
- Kotor Varoš
- Teslić
- Grabovica
