= Ravne, Kotor Varoš =

Ravne
- Village
- Location in Bosnia and Herzegovina
- Coordinates: 44.6278°N 17.3394°E
- Country: Bosnia and Herzegovina
- Entity: Republika Srpska
- Municipality: Kotor Varoš

Population (1991)
  - Total: 443
- Time zone: Central European
- Area code: +387 (051)

Ravne (Serbian Cyrillic: Равне) is a settlement in the Bosnia and Herzegovina, Republika Srpska entity, Kotor Varoš Municipality.

== Population ==
Ravne; Census Year 2013: Total of 339 inhabitants
Census Year	1991.	1981.	1971.
Bosniaks	414 (93,45%)	382 (92,27%)	357 (96,75%)
Croats	28 (6,321%)	27 (6,522%)	10 (2,710%)
Serbs		1 (0,242%)	1 (0,271%)
Yugoslavs		3 (0,725%)	
Others and unknown	1 (0,226%)	1 (0,242%)	1 (0,271%)
Total	443	414	369

== See also ==
- Kotor Varoš
