= Palivuk =

Palivuk – Паливук
- Village
- Location in Bosnia and Herzegovina
- Coordinates: 44.4311°N 17.6103°E
- Country: Bosnia and Herzegovina
- Entity: Republika Srpska
- Municipality: Kotor Varoš
- Highest elevation: 710 m (2,330 ft)
- Lowest elevation: 750 m (2,460 ft)

Population (2013)
  - Total: 24
- Time zone: Central European
- Area code: +387 (051)

Palivuk (Паливук) is a sparsely populated town in Bosnia and Herzegovina, Republika Srpska, Kotor-Varoš Municipality. In 1991, the village had 391 residents, but by 2013 that number had dropped to just 24 citizens.

== Geography ==
Palivuk is located on a conspicuous hill on the slopes of the right bank of the Vrbanja river in Bosnia-Herzegovina. It stands at an elevation of approximately 2,560 feet. The local roads are connected to the regional route R-540: Kruševo Brdo – Šiprage – Obodnik – Kotor Varoš – Banja Luka.

== History ==
The location of Palivuk is a very old settlement. It is believed that its history is related to events related to old indigenous Bosnian settlements in the valley of the Vrbanja River and Illyrian.

During World War II, the village took part in the resistance against Nazi occupation and was a small Yugoslav Partisan refuge in January 1944. The town received a large number of wounded resistance fighters who were evacuated from areas in the gorge around the Cakewalk river (near Šiprage) during the Sixth enemy offensive. Because of Palivuk's distance and remoteness from larger local population centers, the village was a safe refuge for many residents of the region when the German Nazi forces advanced.

During the War in Bosnia (1992–95), Army of Republika Srpska (VRS) police and paramilitary forces demolished the surrounding Bosniaks villages. The demolition was particularly concentrated upstream from Palivuk, along the Vrbanja to Kruševo Brdo, as well as all Bosnian villages downstream to Banja Luka. Many local residents were killed, and the majority were expelled from the region. After the end of the war in 1996, many Bosnian villages around Šiprage were partly restored via efforts from the new Government and the soldiers of Bhe ELUGA (battalion abbv. Belgium – Luxembourg – Greece – Austria);, with activities of EUFOR-SFOR-Missiona. However, Palivuk was not involved in this program of renewal.

== Population ==
=== Palivuk (Major City) ===
Ethnic group	1991
Serbs	
Bosniaks	252
Yugoslavs	1
Other	1
Total	254

=== Census Area ===
Palivuk
Census Year	2013	1991
Bosniaks	24 (100,0%)	252 (64,45%)
Serbs		137 (35,04%)
Yugoslavs		1 (0,256%)
Others and unknown		1 (0,256%)
Total	24	391
