= Večići =

- Village
- Location in Bosnia and Herzegovina
- Coordinates: 44°34′25″N 17°25′55″E
- Country: Bosnia and Herzegovina
- Entity: Republika Srpska
- Municipality: Kotor Varoš

Population (2013)
  - Total: 687
- Postal code: ++387 051

Večići is a village in the Bosnia and Herzegovina, Kotor Varoš municipality of the Republika Srpska region in northwestern Bosnia and Herzegovina. It spread at Večićko polje (Večići's field), nearby the mouth of Cvrcka (in Vrbanja river).

Its population was reported to be 300 people in 2009, all of whom were Bosniaks. In 1992 there were 1,110. The narrower region is mainly populated by Serb people.

During the Bosnian War, the village was a pocket of Bosniak resistance against the Bosnian Serb forces of Ratko Mladić. It suffered severe damage at the hands of the Mladić forces, including destruction of the village mosque. In the aftermath of war, the American Refugee Committee organised construction of some new housing in the village and the government was attempting to encourage resettlement of the minority Muslim community in the area. The anthropologist Madelyn Iris noted that "No home had been left undamaged, and no extended family had been left entirely intact." Some of the villagers had died in a massacre at nearby Grabovica in November 1992 and 161 men and boys were killed in the village itself in the same month.

== Population ==
Večići population
Census Year	2013	1991.	1981.	1971.
Bosniaks	652 (94.9%)	1.110 (63.64%)	989 (95.46%)	771 (95.18%)
Serbs	7 (1%)	409 (23.45%)	1 (0.09%)	0
Croats	25 (3.6%)	221 (12.67%)	46 (4.44%)	37 (4.56%)
Yugoslavs	-	1 (0.05%)	0	1 (0.12%)
Others	3 (0.4%)	3 (0.17%)	0	1 (0.12%)
Total	687	1,744	1,036	810

== See also ==
- Cvrcka
- Vrbanjci
