= Vagani =

Vagani – Вагани
- Village
- Location in Bosnia and Herzegovina
- Coordinates: 44.5886°N 17.2828°E
- Country: Bosnia and Herzegovina
- Entity: Republika Srpska
- Municipality: Kotor Varoš

Population (1991)
  - Total: 370
- Time zone: Central European
- Area code: +387 (051)
- Website: http://www.opstinakotorvaros.com/

Vagani (Serbian Cyrillic: Вагани) is a village in Kotor-Varoš Municipality, Bosnia and Herzegovina. In the census of 1991 there were 370 inhabitants, and in 2013, 113.

== Population ==
Census year	1991	1981	1971
Serbs	363 (98.11%)	490 (99.39%)	500 (99.80%)
Croats		1 (0.20%)	1 (0.20%)
Yugoslavs		2 (0.41%)	
Other and unknown	7 (1.89%)		
Total	613	582	497
