= Vranić, Kotor Varoš =

Vranić – Вранић
- Village
- Location in Bosnia and Herzegovina
- Coordinates: 44.638056°N 17.316111°E
- Country: Bosnia and Herzegovina
- Entity: Republika Srpska
- Municipality: Kotor Varoš

Population (1991)
  - Total: 277
- Time zone: Central European
- Area code: +387 (051)

Vranić (Serbian Cyrillic: Вранић) is a settlement in the Bosnia and Herzegovina, Republika Srpska entity, Kotor Varoš Municipality.

== Population ==
Vranić; Census Year 2013: Total of 162 inhabitants
Census Year	1991	1981	1971
Bosniaks	277 (100,0%)	289 (92,93%)	327 (80,74%)
Croats	–	12 (3,859%)	12 (2,963%)
Serbs	–	4 (1,286%)	62 (15,31%)
Yugoslavs	–	–	2 (0,494%)
Others and unknown	–	6 (1,929%)	2 (0,494%)
Total	277	311	405

== See also ==
- Kotor Varoš
