= Viševice =

Viševice – Вишевице
- Village
- Location in Bosnia and Herzegovina
- Coordinates: 44.6278°N 17.3394°E
- Country: Bosnia and Herzegovina
- Entity: Republika Srpska
- Municipality: Kotor Varoš
- Highest elevation: 890 m (2,920 ft)
- Lowest elevation: 876 m (2,874 ft)

Population (1991)
  - Total: 372
- Time zone: Central European
- Area code: +387 (051)

Viševice (Serbian Cyrillic: Вишевице) is/was a settlement in the Bosnia and Herzegovina, Republika Srpska entity, Kotor Varoš Municipality.

In Census Year 2013, in this village only 5 inhabitants were registered.

== Population ==
Viševice; Census Year 2013: Total of 5 inhabitants
Census Year	1991.	1981.	1971.
Croats	366 (98,39%)	319 (99,07%)	316 (99,37%)
Serbs	1 (0,269%)	–	2 (0,629%)
Yugoslavs	2 (0,538%)	3 (0,932%)	–
Others and unknown	3 (0,806%)	–	–
Total	372	322	318

== See also ==
- Kotor Varoš
