= Bilice, Kotor Varoš =

Bilice
- Location in Bosnia and Herzegovina
- Coordinates: 44°38′01″N 17°25′16″E
- Country: Bosnia and Herzegovina
- Entity: Republika Srpska
- Municipality: Kotor Varoš
- Elevation: 456 m (1,496 ft)

Population
  - Total: 26 (2,013)

Bilice is a populated place in the Kotor Varoš Municipality of Central Bosnia, Bosnia and Herzegovina.

== Population ==
Bilice Total population 2013: 26 citizens
Census Year	1991	1981	1971
Croats	474 (93,68%)	468 (89,48%)	515 (90,03%)
Serbs	32 (6,324%)	50 (9,560%)	52 (9,091%)
Bosniaks	–	1 (0,191%)	–
Yugoslavs	–	4 (0,765%)	2 (0,350%)
Others and unknown	–	–	3 (0,524%)
Total	506	523	572

== See also ==
- Kotor Varoš
