= Boljanići, Kotor Varoš =

Boljanići Бољанићи
- Village
- Location in Bosnia and Herzegovina
- Country: Bosnia and Herzegovina
- Entity: Republika Srpska
- Municipality: Kotor Varoš
- Time zone: Central European
- Area code: +387 (051)

Boljanići (Serbian Cyrillic: Бољанићи) is a village in the Kotor Varoš municipality, in the Republika Srpska entity of Bosnia and Herzegovina.

== Population ==
Boljanići; Census Year 2013: Total of 135 inhabitants
Census Year	1991.	1981.	1971.
Serbs	266 (100,0%)	357(99,44%)	331 (99,40%)
Yugoslavs	–	2 (0,557%)	–
Others	–	–	2 (0,601%)
Total	266	359	333

== See also ==
- Kotor Varoš
