= Sokoline =

- Village
- Location in Bosnia and Herzegovina
- Coordinates: 44.5869°N 17.3586°E
- Country: Bosnia and Herzegovina
- Entity: Republika Srpska
- Municipality: Kotor Varoš
- Lowest elevation: 751 m (2,464 ft)

Population (2013)
  - Total: 0
- Time zone: Central European
- Postal code: ++387 (051)

Sokoline is a destroyed Croatian village in the Kotor Varoš municipality in north-central Bosnia and Herzegovina. According to the 2013 preliminary census, there were 0 inhabitants.

The village is on the Grabačevac river.

Sokoline had 504 inhabitants in 1991, mostly Croatians. When the war in Bosnia broke out in 1992, all of the inhabitants were expelled from their homes and were promised that they could return. The houses were destroyed together with the church and school. The church was rebuilt in 2000.

== Sokoline parish ==
The Sokoline parish was established in 1872.

During the 1991 war all parishioners were expelled, the parish church was set on fire, and the parish office was completely destroyed and devastated. The cemetery chapels in Sokoline and Viševica were destroyed. Elijah in the village of Jakotina. The church and the parish office were partially restored and protected from further deterioration in 2000.

== Demographics ==
- 1961 = 350

Sokoline; Census Year 2013: Total of 5 inhabitants
Census year	1991	1981	1971
Croats	497 (98.61%)	478 (99.17%)	382 (99.48%)
Serbs		4 (0.830%)	1 (0.260%)
Others and unknown	7 (1.389%)		1
Total	504	482	384
