= Kotor Varoš =

Town and municipality in Bosnia and Herzegovina

Kotor Varoš Котор Варош
- Town and municipality
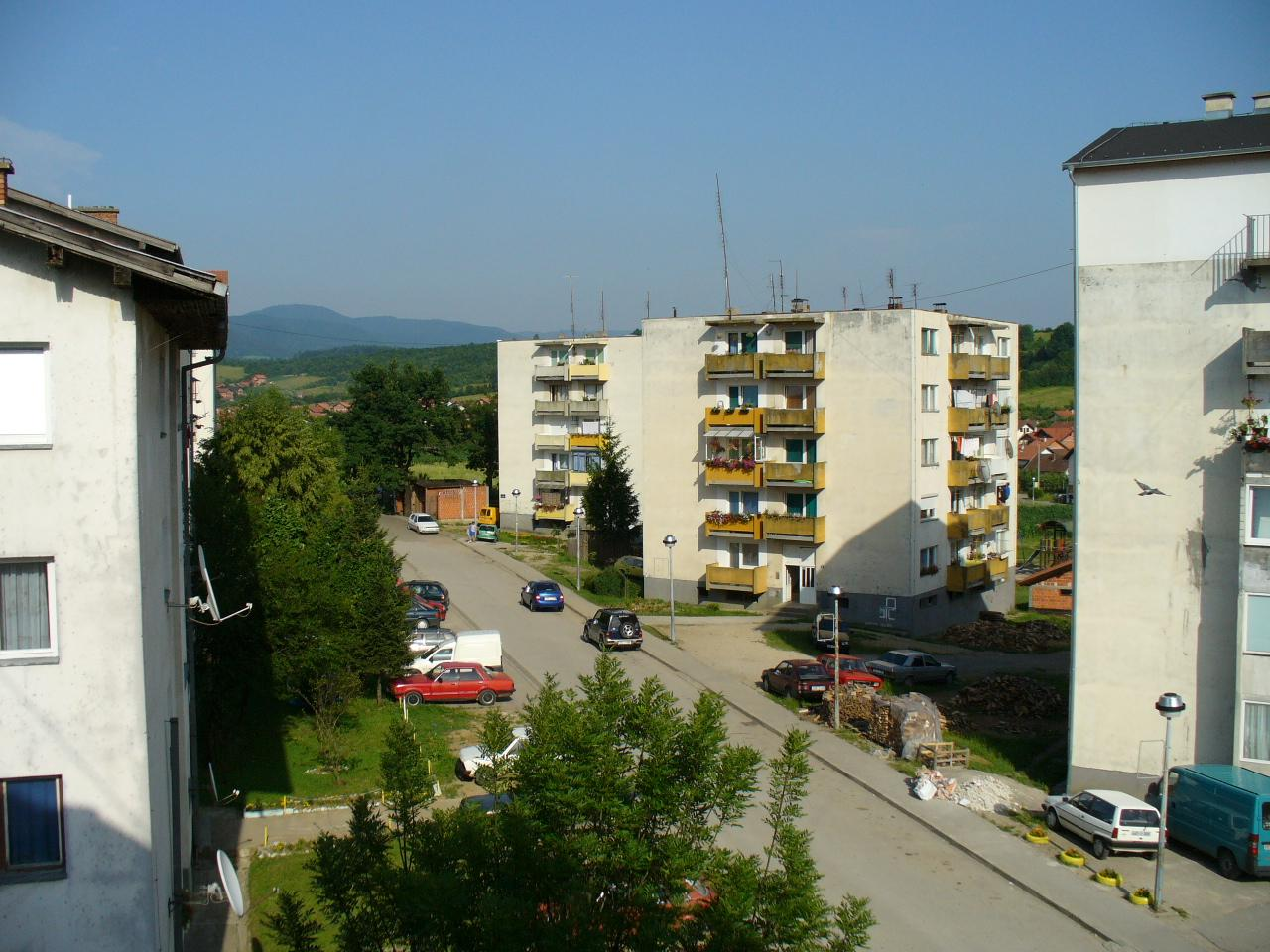
- Kotor Varoš

- Coat of arms

- Location of Kotor Varoš within Republika Srpska

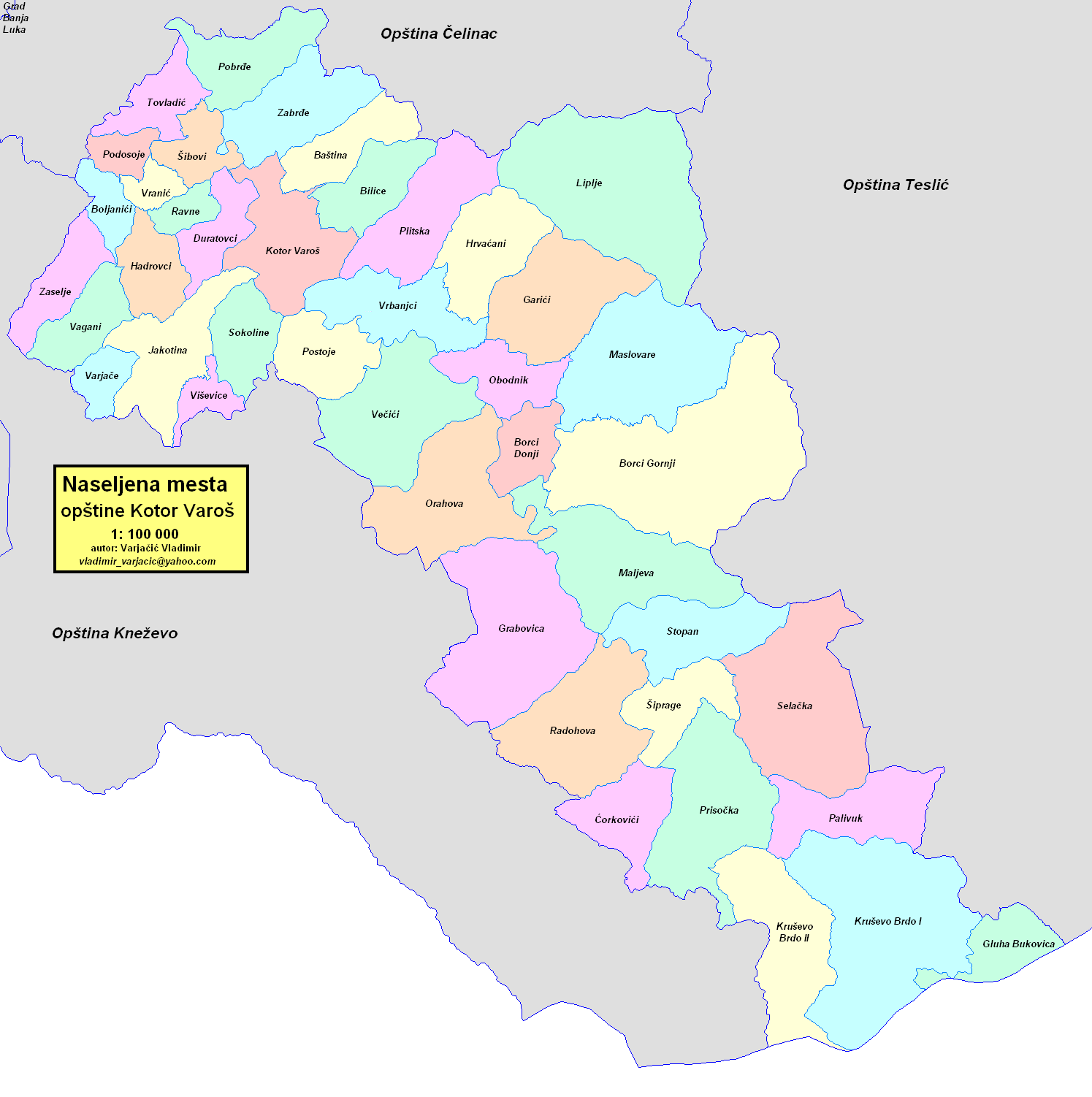
- Coordinates: 44°37′20″N 17°22′13″E
- Country: Bosnia and Herzegovina
- Entity: Republika Srpska

Government
  - Municipal mayor: Zdenko Sakan (PDP)
  - Municipality: 544.26 km^{2} (210.14 sq mi)

Population (2013 census)
  - Town: 7,330
  - Municipality: 19,710
  - Municipality density: 36.21/km^{2} (93.79/sq mi)
- Time zone: UTC+1 (CET)
  - Summer (DST): UTC+2 (CEST)
- Area code: 51

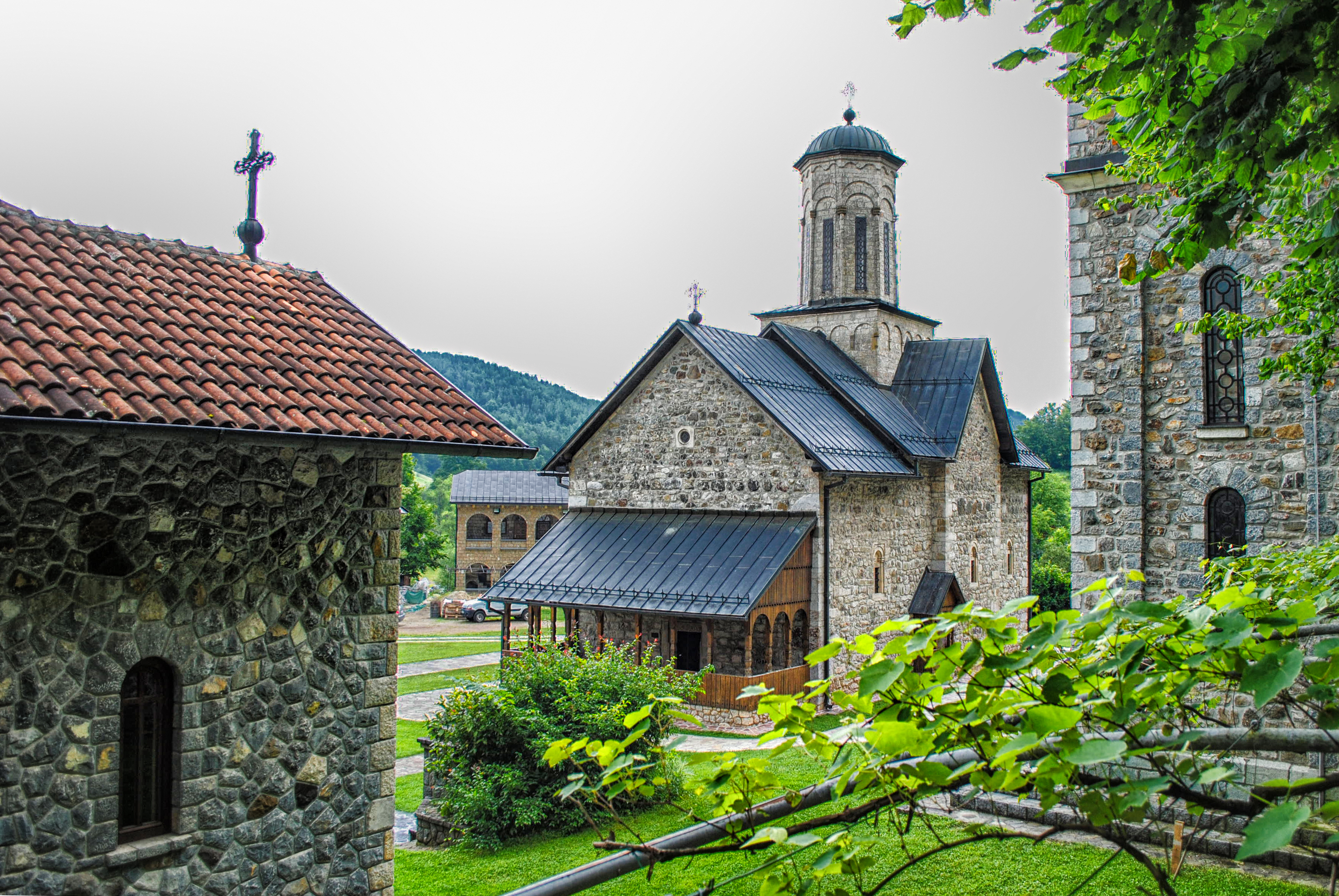
Liplje monastery, first mentioned for the first time in 1576.

Kotor Varoš (Serbian Cyrillic: Котор Варош) is a town and municipality in Republika Srpska, Bosnia and Herzegovina. As of 2013 census, the municipality has a population of 19,710 inhabitants, while the town of Kotor Varoš has a population of 7,330 inhabitants.

== History ==
An early Roman (3rd–5th c.) basilica was discovered along with other Roman findings in the Šiprage area, at the Crkvenica-Vrbanja river mouth. 12th-century stećci testify a medieval settlement. The original location of the stećci was at the Crkvenica-Vrbanja, from where they were removed and built into the walls of surrounding buildings (possibly due to the belief in their miraculous properties). One of the best preserved steći is submerged in the Vrbanja.

It has been theorized that Kotor Varoš was mentioned in the De Administrando Imperio as "Katera" (Greek: Κατερα), a part of the "land of Bosnia".

The town was part of the Donji Kraji province of the Banate of Bosnia in the 13th century, and the Kingdom in the 14th and 15th century. The Kotor fortress and its podgrađe was the property of the Hrvatinić noble family.

Austro-Hungarian rule in Bosnia and Herzegovina began in 1878 and ended with the establishment of the Kingdom of Serbs, Croats and Slovenes in 1918, later renamed Kingdom of Yugoslavia. The town was part of the Vrbas Banovina (1929–41), but after World War II it became part of the Socialist Republic of Bosnia and Herzegovina, a republic of Yugoslavia.

=== Bosnian War ===
During the Bosnian War (1992–95), some religious and cultural monuments and landmarks were destroyed by paramilitary groups, such as a Catholic church in the centre of the town, as well as all of the mosques. In the southern Čaršija (bazaar) quarter of the town nearly all houses were destroyed.

== Settlements ==
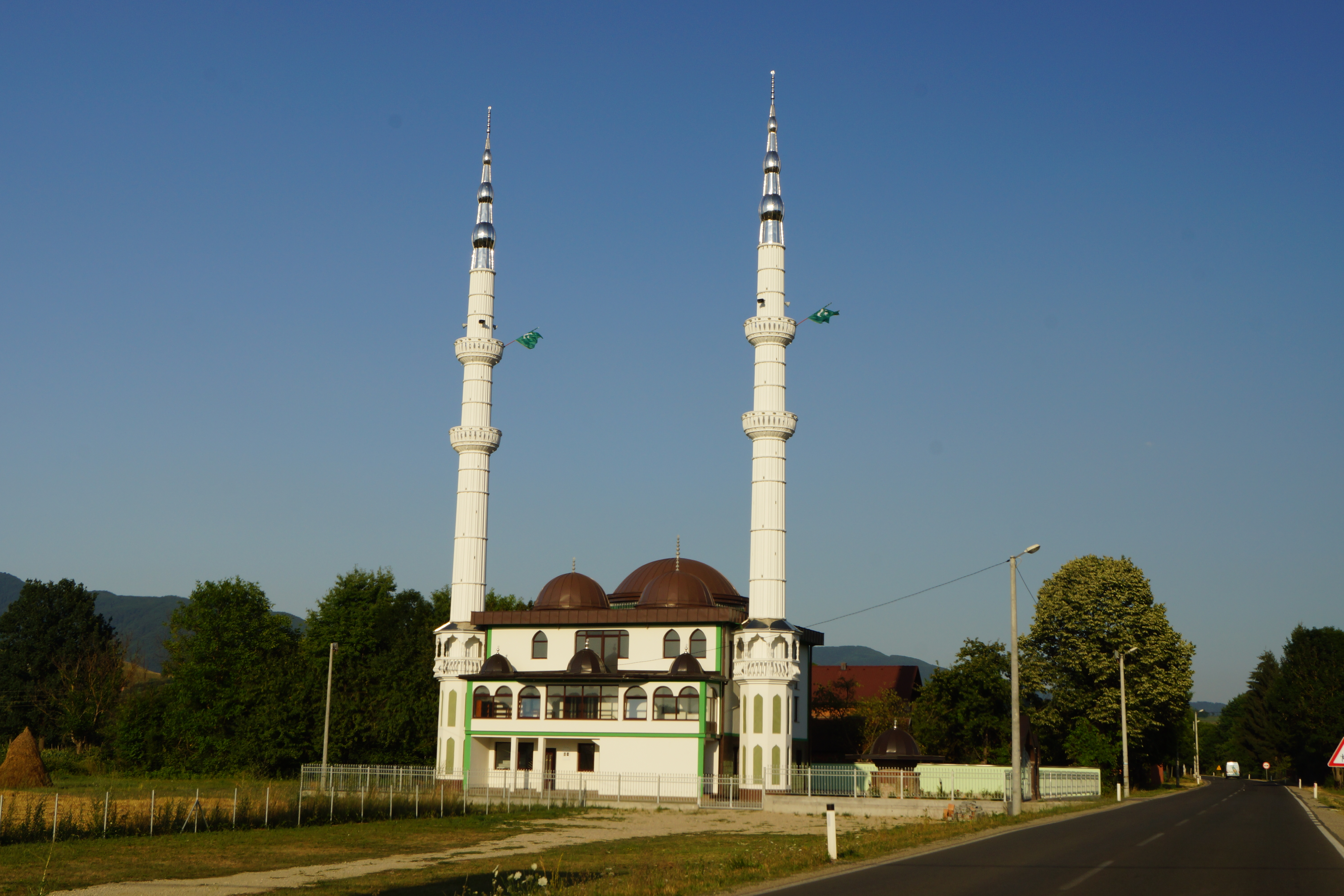
New mosque in Vrbanjci, in Kotor Varoš, built after the Bosnian War.

Aside from the town of Kotor Varoš, the municipality includes the following settlements:

- Baština
- Bilice
- Boljanići
- Borci Donji
- Borci Gornji
- Ćorkovići
- Duratovci
- Garići
- Grabovica
- Hadrovci
- Hrvaćani
- Hanifići
- Jakotina
- Kruševo Brdo
- Liplje
- Maljeva
- Maslovare
- Obodnik
- Orahova
- Palivuk
- Plitska
- Podbrđe
- Podosoje
- Postoje
- Prisočka
- Radohova
- Ravne
- Selačka
- Sokoline
- Stopan
- Šibovi
- Šiprage
- Tovladić
- Vagani
- Varjače
- Večići
- Viševice
- Vranić
- Vrbanjci
- Zabrđe
- Zaselje

== Demographics ==
=== Population ===
Population of settlements – Kotor Varoš municipality
	Settlement	1895.	1910.	1921.	1931.	1948.	1953.	1961.	1971.	1981.	1991.	2013.
	Total	20,858	23,780	22,072	27,236	22,198	37,898	32,516	32,832	35,713	36,653	19,710
1	Borci Donji										419	255
2	Garići										1,341	498
3	Grabovica										887	345
4	Hrvaćani										745	248
5	Kotor Varoš	312	1,361	1,428	1,400	2,428	4,715	2,893	3,746	5,423	7,411	7,330
6	Liplje										744	271
7	Maljeva										595	200
8	Maslovare										2,284	1,930
9	Orahova									842	650	
10	Prisočka										1,423	208
11	Radohova										700	236
12	Šibovi										671	230
13	Šiprage										952	652
14	Večići										1,744	608
15	Vrbanjci										2,975	1,902
16	Zabrđe										1,154	482

=== Ethnic composition ===
Ethnic composition – Kotor Varoš town
	2013.	1991.	1981.	1971.
Total	7,330	7,411	5,423	3,746
Serbs	6,251 (82.2%)	2,522 (34%)	1,310 (24.2%)	749 (20%)
Bosniaks	920 (12.1%)	1,800 (24.3%)	1,436 (26.5%)	1,342 (35.8%)
Croats	252 (3.3%)	2,432 (32.8%)	1,789 (33%)	1,490 (40%)
Others	180 (2.4%)	110 (1.5%)	101 (1.8%)	47 (1.2%)
Yugoslavs		547 (7.4%)	787 (14.5%)	110 (3%)

Ethnic composition – Kotor Varoš municipality
	2013.	1991.	1981.	1971.
Total	19,710	36,853	35,713	32,832
Serbs	13,091 (66.4%)	14,056 (38.1%)	14,771 (41.4%)	15,255 (46.5%)
Bosniaks	5,241 (26.6%)	11,090 (30%)	9,667 (27.1%)	8,366 (25.5%)
Croats	1,116 (5.6%)	10,695 (29%)	9,572 (26.8%)	8,863 (27%)
Others	262 (1.3%)	267 (0.7%)	405 (1.1%)	172 (0.5%)
Yugoslavs		745 (2%)	1,298 (3.6%)	176 (0.5%)

== Economy ==
The following table gives a preview of total number of registered employed people per their core activity (as of 2016):

Professional field	Total
Agriculture, forestry and fishing	300
Mining and quarrying	2
Manufacturing	2,998
Distribution of power, gas, steam and air-conditioning	45
Distribution of water and water waste management	43
Construction	84
Wholesale and retail, repair	342
Transportation and storage	126
Hotels and restaurants	112
Information and communication	24
Finance and insurance	25
Real estate activities	5
Professional, scientific and technical activities	27
Administrative and support services	91
Public administration and defence	193
Education	316
Healthcare and social work	115
Art, entertainment and recreation	7
Other service activities	55
Total	4,910

== Notable people ==
- 14th century Bosnian Grand Duke, Hrvoje Vukčić's main seat of power was in the Kotor Fortress.
- Croatian footballer Mateo Kovačić's parents are from Kotor Varoš

== Features ==
The city also features a large monument to the local partisans who died for Yugoslavia during the fighting with the German and Ustaša forces during WW2.

== Sister cities ==
- Kranj, Slovenia
- Herceg Novi, Montenegro
- Kraljevo, Serbia

== Gallery ==
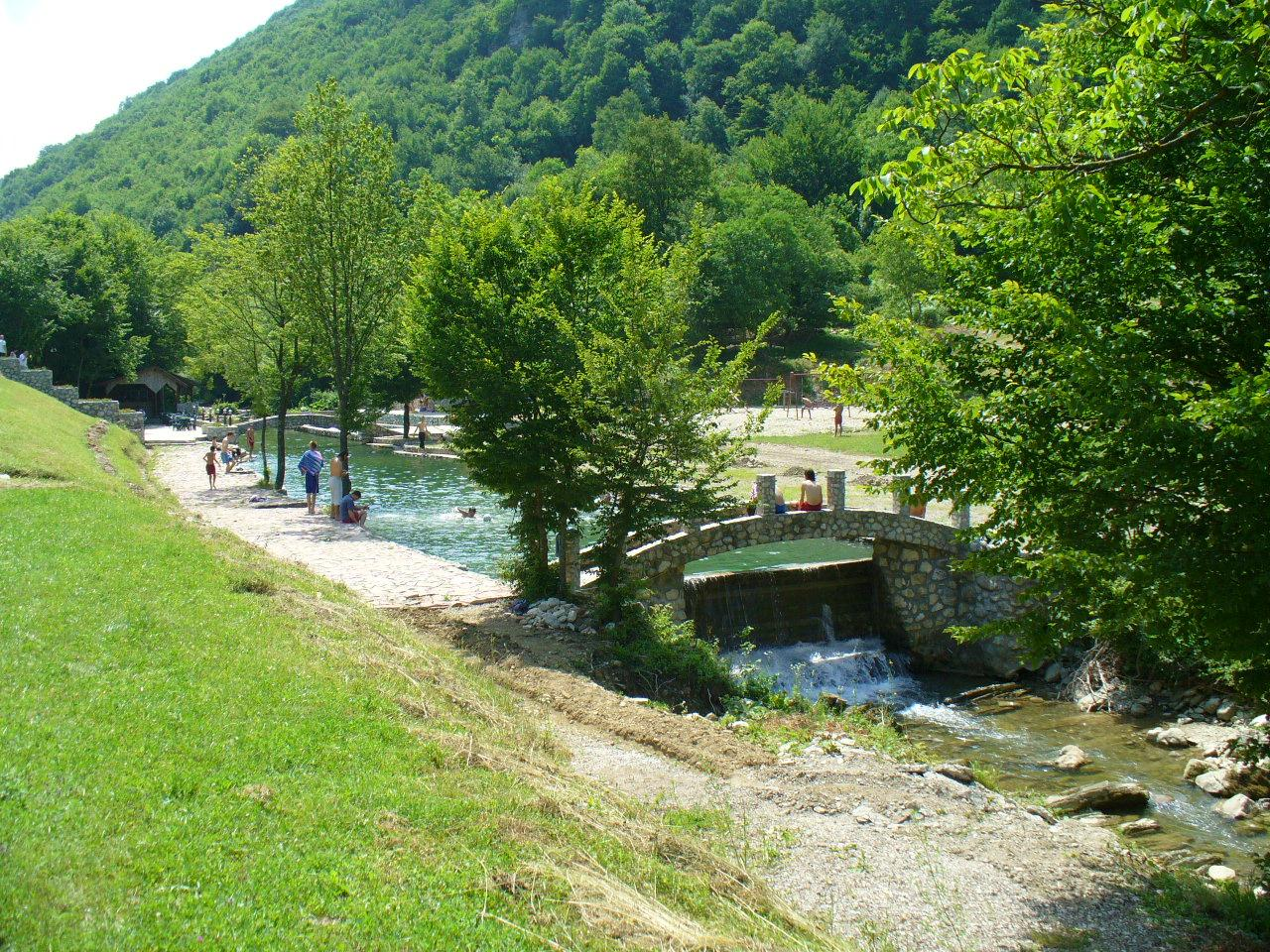
Swimming dam on the Bobas, a popular attraction

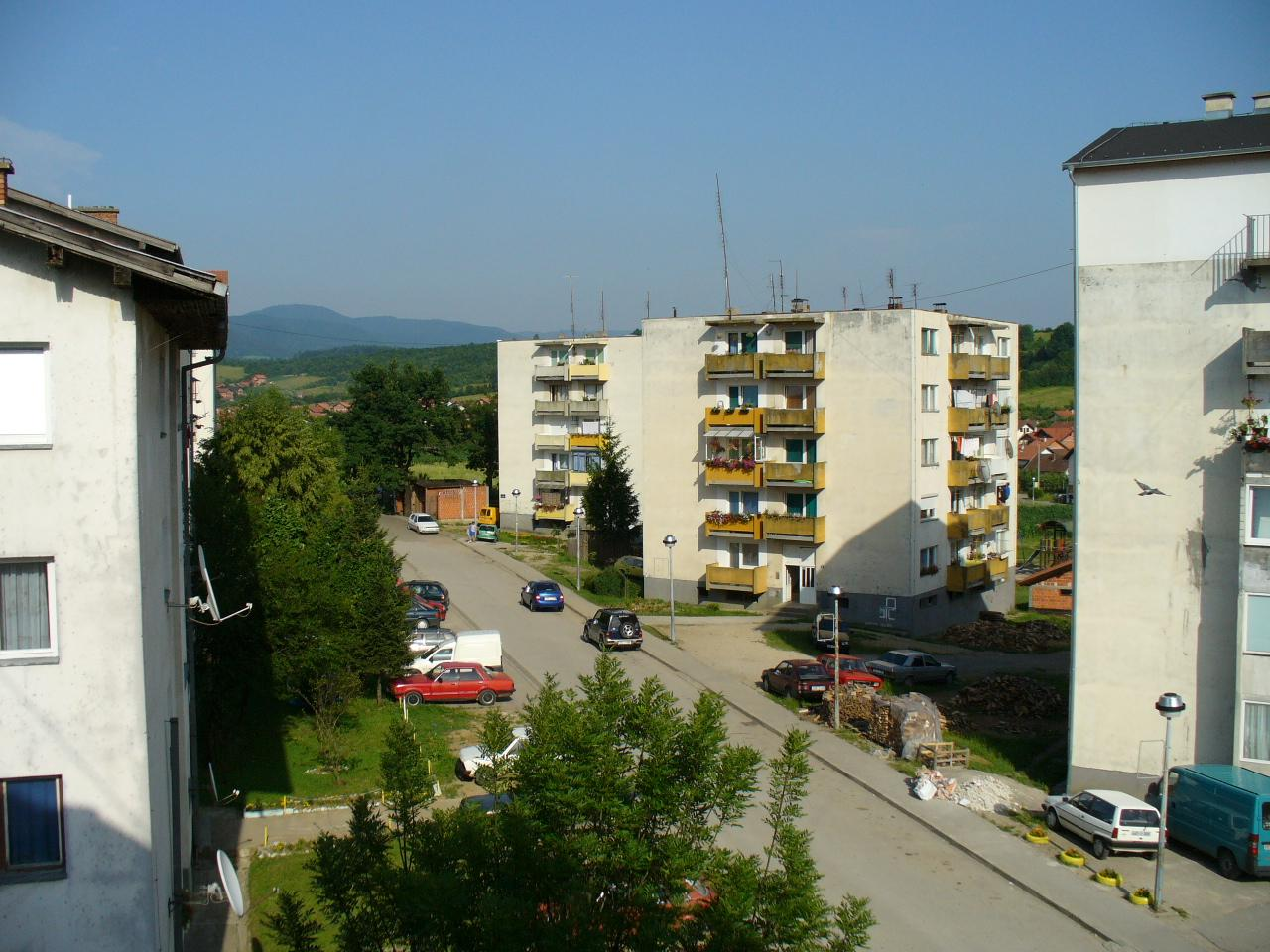
"Kocke" apartment blocks in town

Elementary school "Sveti Sava" (formerly "Bratstvo i jedinstvo")

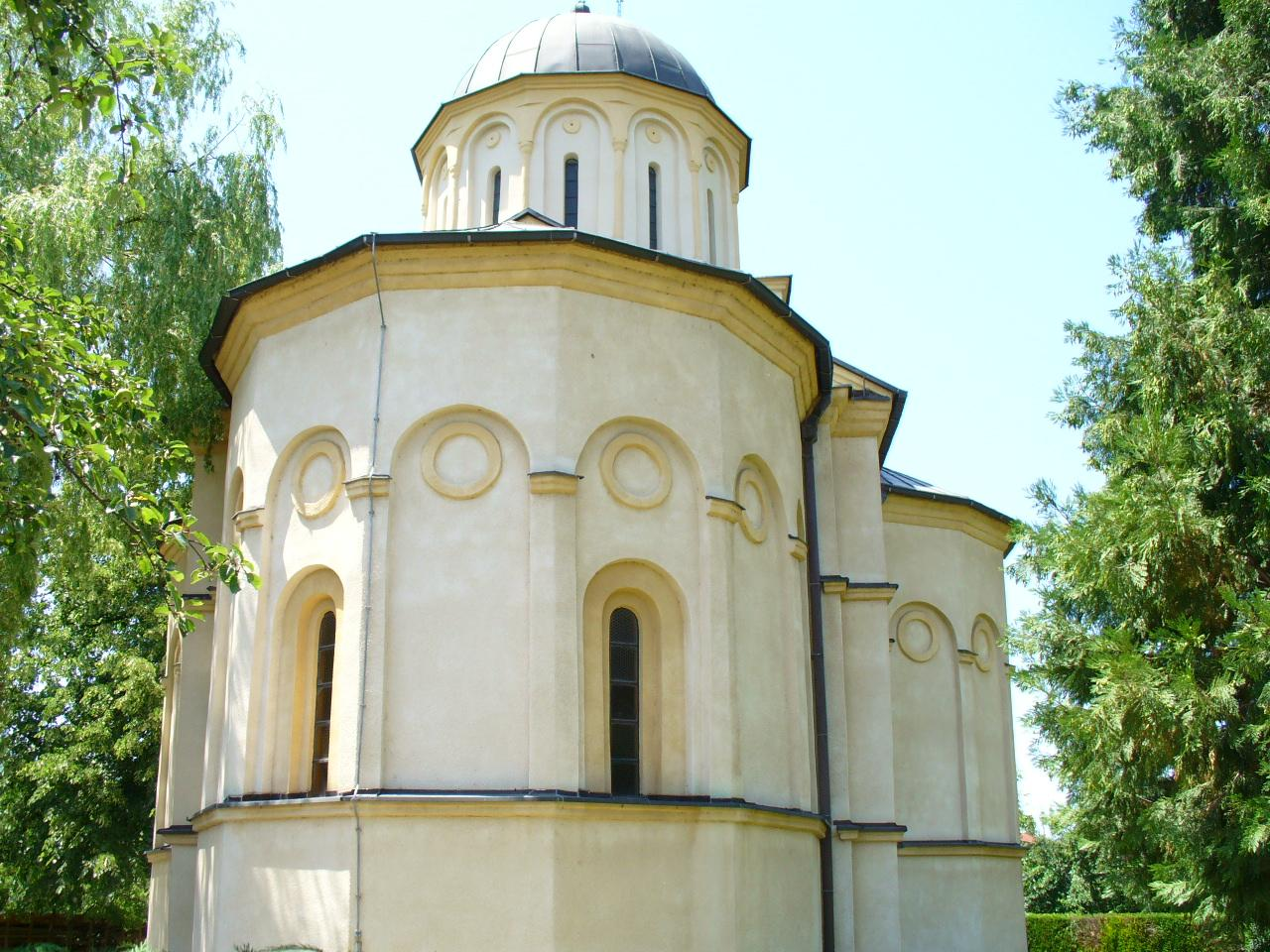
Orthodox church in Kotor Varoš

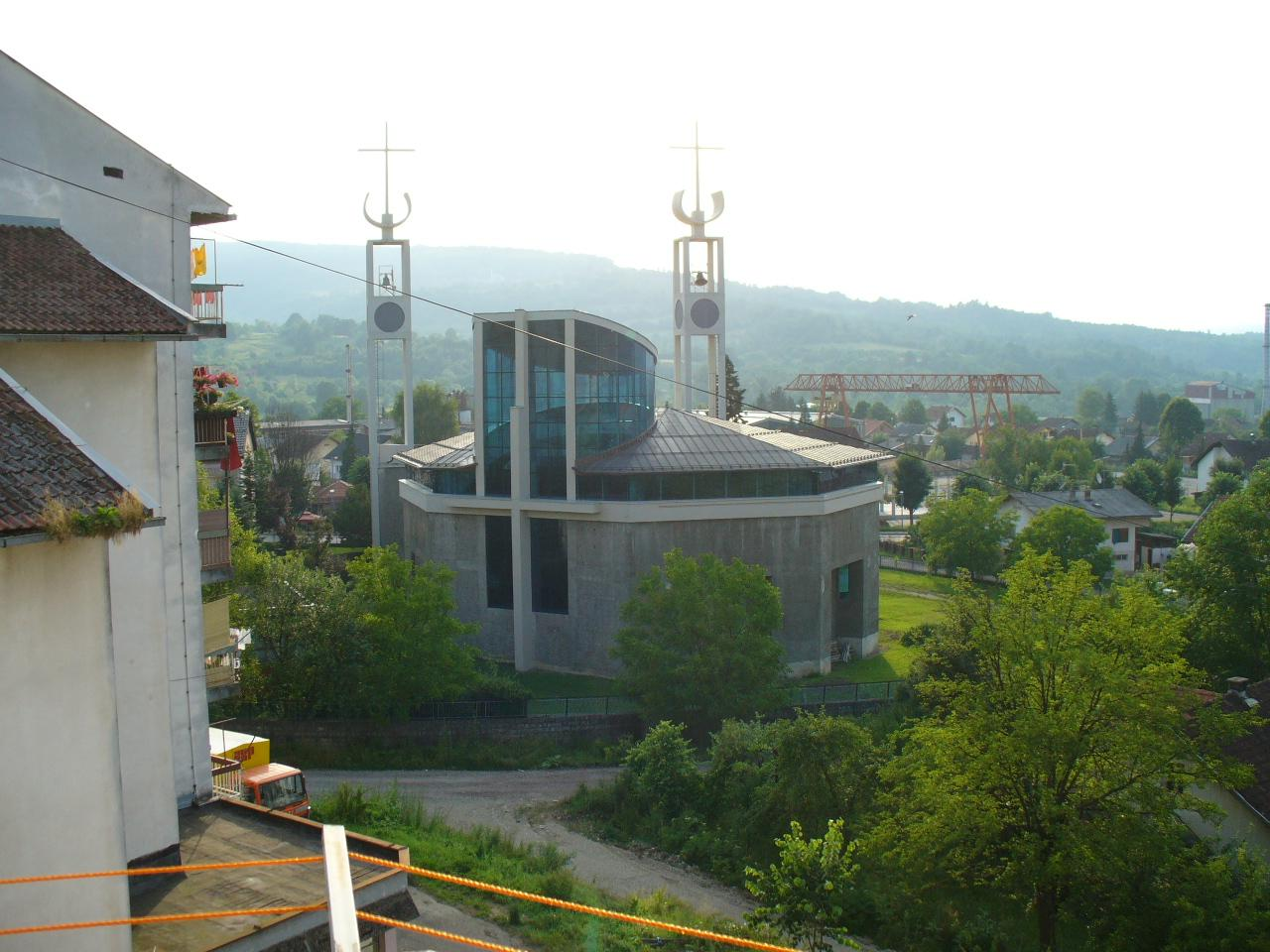
Catholic church in Kotor Varoš, rebuilt

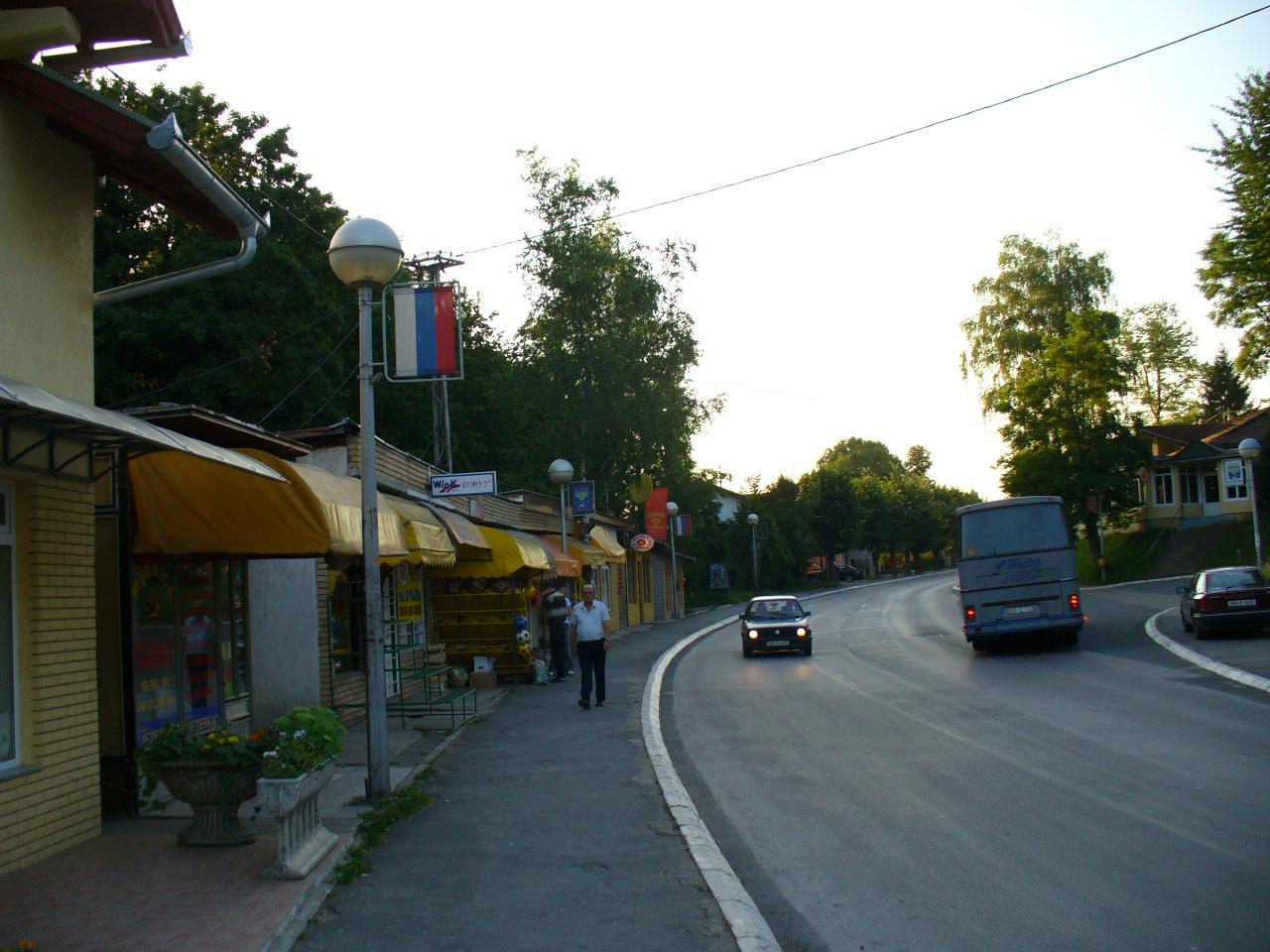
Old marketplace, čaršija, shops on the left side

== Sources ==
- Vojnogeografski institut, Izd. (1955): Prnjavor (List karte 1:100.000, Izohipse na 20 m). Vojnogeografski institut, Beograd.
- Spahić M. et al. (2000): Bosna i Hercegovina (1:250.000). Izdavačko preduzeće "Sejtarija", Sarajevo.
- Mučibabić B., Ur. (1998): Geografski atlas Bosne i Hercegovine. Geodetski zavod BiH, Sarajevo.
