= Jasenovi Potoci =

Village in the country of Bosnia and Herzegovina

Jasenovi Potoci Јасенови Потоци
- Village and Settlement
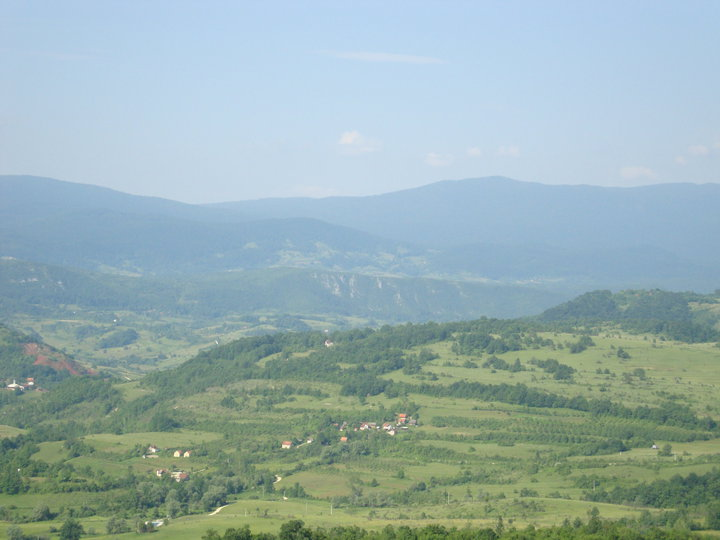

- Location within Bosnia and Herzegovina
- Coordinates: 44.2892°N 16.8583°E
- Country: Bosnia and Herzegovina
- Entity: Republika Srpska
- Geographical Region: Bosanska Krajina
- Municipality: Mrkonjić Grad

Area
  - Total: 26.22 km^{2} (10.12 sq mi)

Population
  - Total: 98 (100.0% Serbs)
- Demonym: Potočar
- Postal code: 70260

Jasenovi Potoci (Serbian Cyrillic: Јасенови Потоци) is a settlement located in the Municipality of Mrkonjić Grad, of the Republika Srpska Entity in Bosnia and Herzegovina. It is in close proximity to three neighboring municipalities; Glamoc, Šipovo, and Ribnik. The settlement is located under the Dinaric Alps.

== Etymology ==
The Settlement's name, Jasenovi Potoci derives from local ash trees and numerous creeks which are prevalent in this area.

== Geography ==
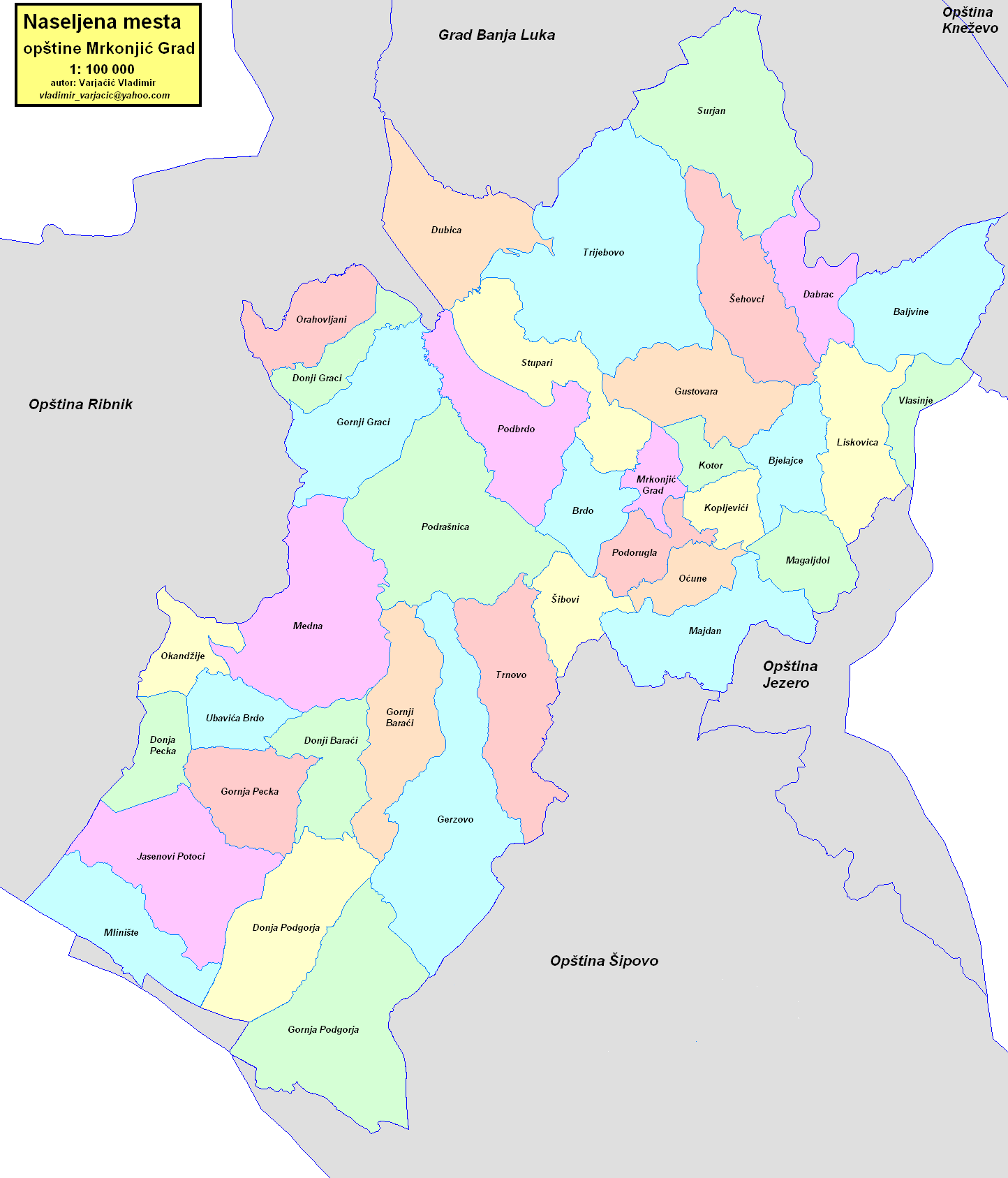
Jasenovi Potoci

Jasenovi Potoci is the farthest village from its municipality capital Mrkonjić Grad (40km). The settlement is bordered by settlements Mlinište, Podgorija, Pecka, and Vrbljani. Some inhabitants of Potoci are tied to neighboring Ravna Mliništa for haymaking and its grasslands perfect for shepherds.

The settlement is locally divided by local tales and settlers with areas of it being known as Ljubišina Dolina, Iverići, Jastrebinja, Đundići, Lipa, Bara, Palalići, and Jojikići.

The settlement is situated at an elevation from 700 to 1,143 meters. The three springs of the Sana river can be found near the settlement area.

== Economy ==
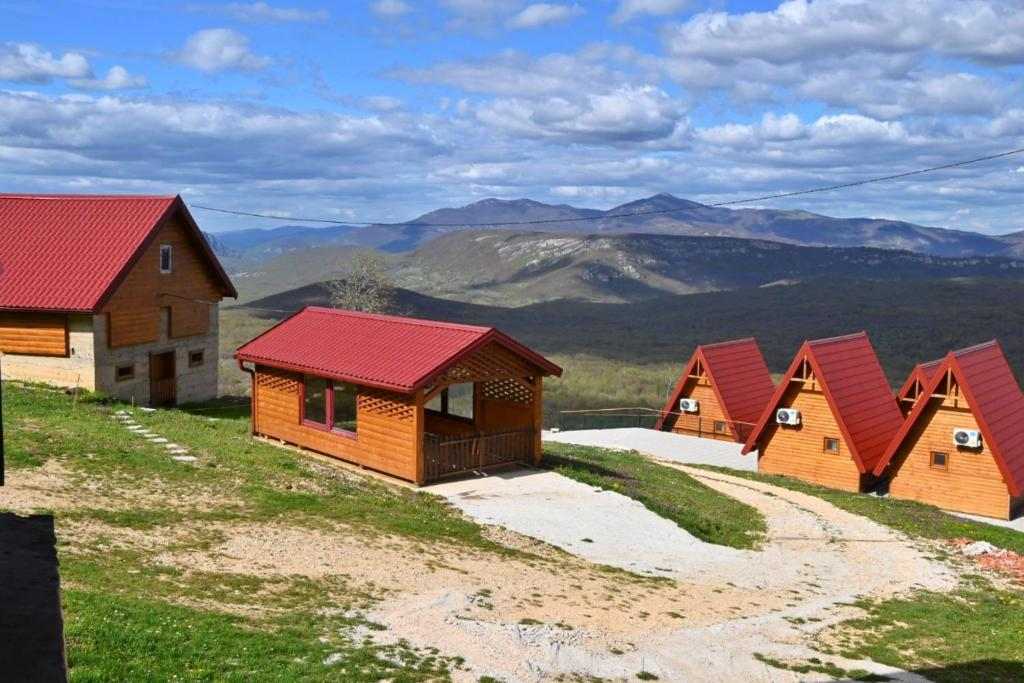
Potočarski Bungalows

The economy of Jasenovi Potoci, although small, is supported mainly by the wood-cutting industry, and tourist attractions such as the recently built Potočarska Panorama which are bungalows and the springs of the Sana. The Pliva springs are also located nearby to this settlement.

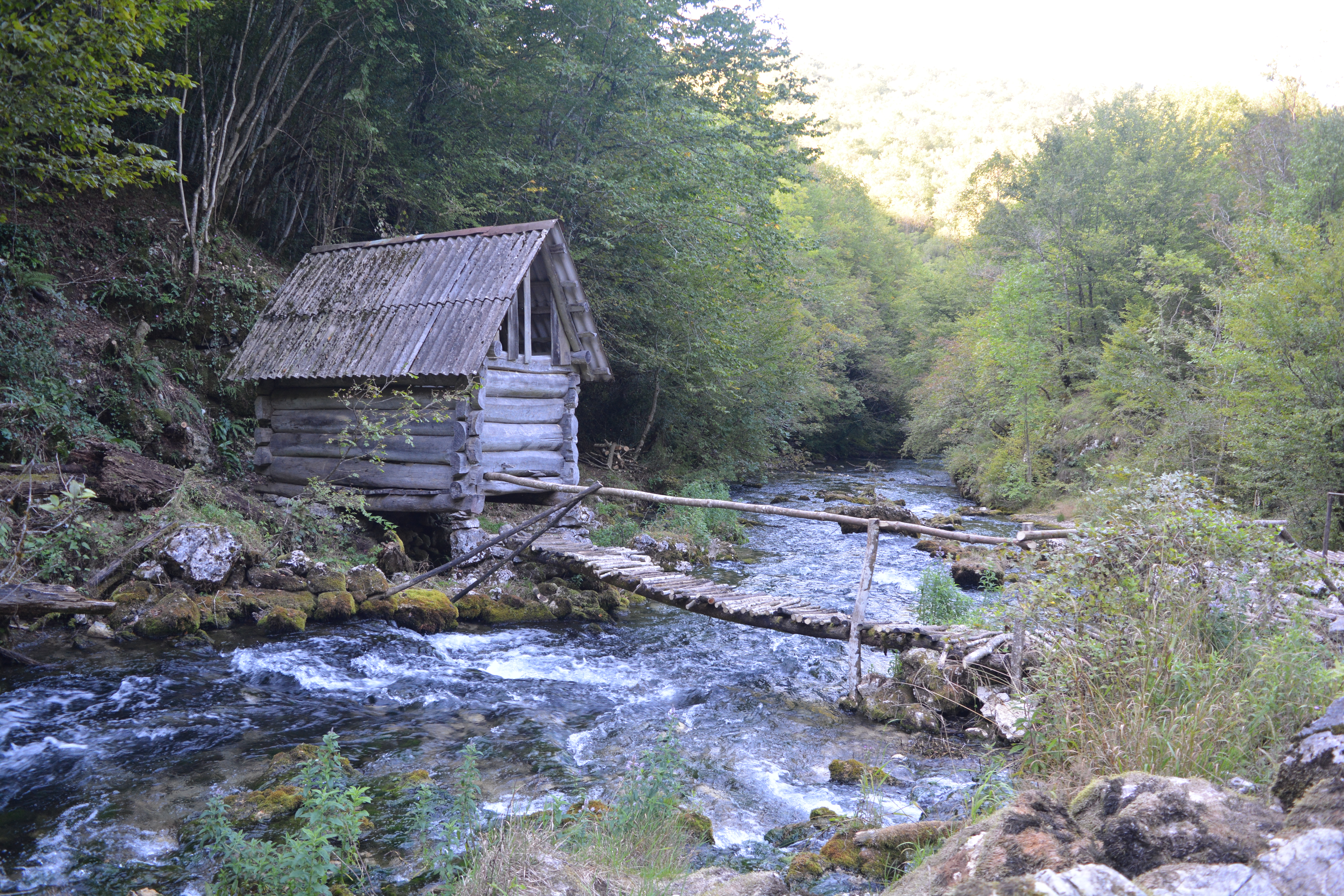
Source spring of the Sana river.

== History ==
=== Ottoman Empire ===
During Ottoman times, the region was under the rule of several Bosnian-Ottoman noble families, led by Fahri-Beg Filipović, Derviš-Beg Filipović, and Mustafa Ribić. However, due to the topography of the terrain and large swaths under thick forests, which provided excellent cover, region was known for its local outlaws and hajduks such as Hajduk Gvozdenac.

=== World War One ===
In the first World War, six Serb volunteers from this village participated in the war and were part of the Serbian army's retreat through Albania and the Solun front. They were Simo Ubiparip, Jovan Ubiparip, Jevto Ubiparip, Mićo Palalić, and Lazo Lazić, Niko Marić.

=== World War Two ===
==== Insurgency ====
Due to Ustaše repression, on July 29, 1941, insurgents from the village, attacked Ustaše strongholds in Čardak and Mlinište and captured their positions. As retaliation, the Ustaše killed Janko Stakić and Milan Ubiparip near the Ćorović Hotel in Mlinište. According to villager Mirko Kokeza, these were the first civilian victims in the area. A war ambulatory care was immediately organized in Čardak. On 30 July 1941, the insurgents attacked and disarmed the Ustaše stronghold in Gerzovo. On August 2, 1941, the insurgents fought the Ustaše in Štrbina with ten insurgents dying in the ensuing battle. In memory of this event, a large public gathering is held in Štrbina every year on Ilindan on 2 August. In the second half of August and the first half of September 1941, the insurgents fought against the Ustaše around the railway station in Mlinište, though poorly armed and poorly organized, to prevent further persecution.

In September 1941, the Ustaše massacred 105 civilians throughout the region as retribution against the insurgency.

==== Yugoslav Partisans and Mlinište ====
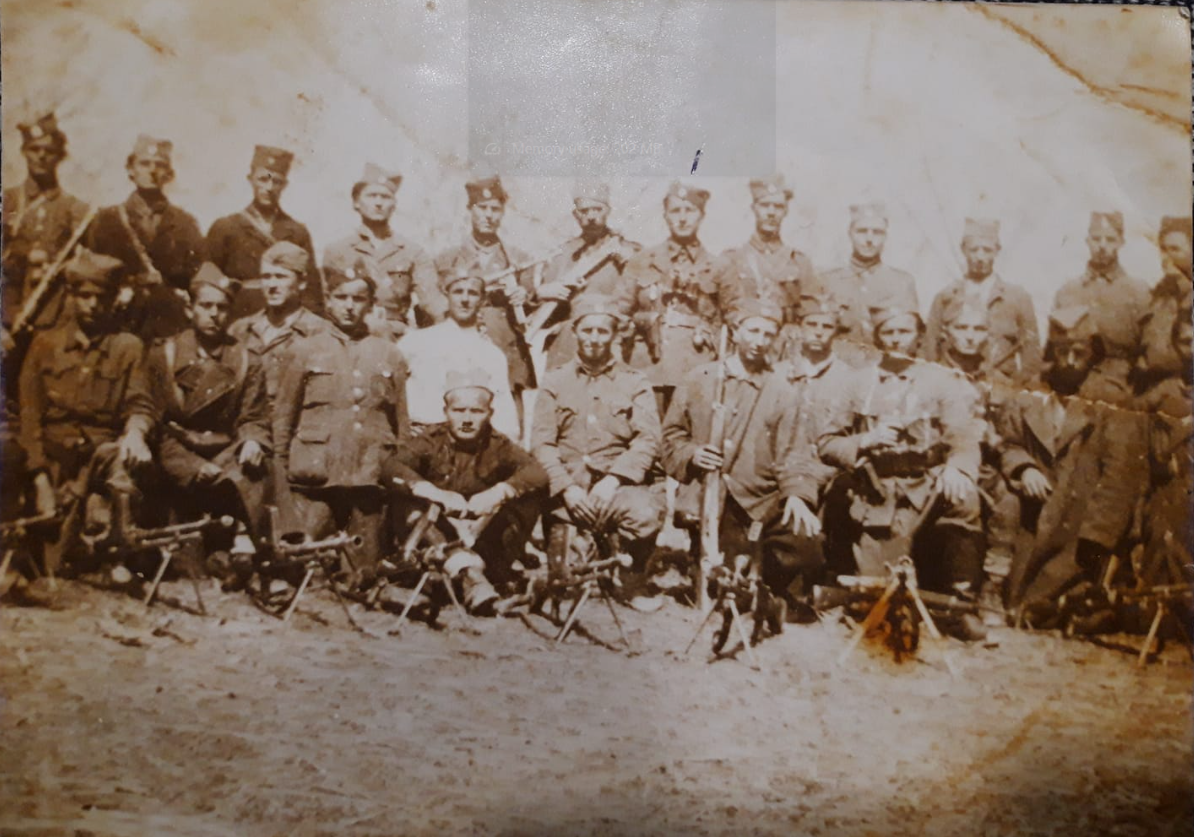
Potočarski Chetniks under the command of Noktaš Tode Todorović

The Supreme Headquarters of the Yugoslav Partisans in Mlinište was formed in 1942. In June 1942, after the 3rd enemy offensive, in the midst of the Battle of the Neretva, Josip Broz Tito decided to march the Partisan military formations from eastern to western Bosnia. This march of the proletarian and shock brigades had the task of encouraging a stronger development of the Partisans in the western parts of the country, connecting the free territory of Bosnia, Dalmatia and Krajina, filling the Partisan units with new fighters and treating the wounded. The 3rd Krajina Partisan Detachment was formed there. The 68th Proletarian Brigades, together with the Supreme Headquarters of the Partisans and the Communist Party, arrived in western Bosnia in the autumn of 1942 after this march, which lasted about 100 days.

Prior to the historic operation to liberate Bihać, the creation of the "Bihać Republic", the creation of AVNOJ, USAOJ, the leadership of the Yugoslav revolution, led by Tito, resided in Mlinište, due to its high altitude and forested terrain. The details of the activities of the Supreme Headquarters of the Partisans, Tito and the Central Committee of the Communist Party of Yugoslavia in Mlinište have not been sufficiently examined, but it is known that from here, from Mlinište, Tito led the revolution and that preparations were made here for the further course of the revolution and the construction of a new government and a new state. In the fall of 1942, during the stay of the Supreme Staff and Tito in Mlinište, the Zlatarski battalion prepared an event in Jasenovi Potoci, which was attended by, in addition to the people from this village, Tito, Milovan Đilas and some other members of the political and military leadership of the Partisans.

==== Chetnik takeover ====
Towards the end of the war, the village was held by the 3rd Chetnik battalion "Petar Kočić". The local commander of the village was Tode Todorović Noktaš. As many as 20 chetniks that died hailed from this village. At least 35 people of this settlement were killed by the Ustaše throughout the war as part of the genocide of Serbs, with numerous other surrounding villages also suffering the same fate.

=== Bosnian War ===
During the Bosnian War, during Operation Mistral-2, the village was occupied by members of the 7th Guards Brigade of the Army of the Republic of Croatia on 9 September 1995, where the army plundered and burned the village, with 3 remaining civilians in the village killed being Mirko Todorović, Petar Todorović, and Branko Učur. 6 fallen members of the VRS hailed from this village. After the war, the settlement was returned to Republika Srpska, with many people returning to their homes without anything left in the village.

== Demographics ==
According to the official census of 1991, Jasenovi Potoci had 284 residents, all of them were Serbs.

| Nationality | 2013 | 1991 | 1981 | 1971 | 1961 | 1953 | 1948 |
| In Total: | 98 (100,0%) | 284 (100,0%) | 475 (100,0%) | 618 (100,0%) | 854 (100,0%) | 747 (100,0%) | 719 (100,0%) |
| Serbs | 98 (100,0%) | 283 (99,60%) | 472 (99,36%) | 615 (99,51%) | 854 (100,0%) | 747 (100,0%) | 719 (100,0%) |
| Yugoslavs | | | 3 (0,64%) | | | | |
| Others | | 1 (0,40%) | | 3 (0,49%) | | | |
| Households | N/A | N/A | 134 | 138 | 147 | 128 | 122 |

== Notable people ==
- Vojo Ubiparip, former Professional football player
- Gojko Ubiparip, Chairmen of the Executive Council of SR BiH from (1984-1986)
- Rajko Ubiparip, former Minister of Industry of Republika Srpska and former general director of the Modriča Oil Refinery
- Dejan Todorović, Professional basketball player for El Calor de Cancún of the LNBP

== Gallery ==
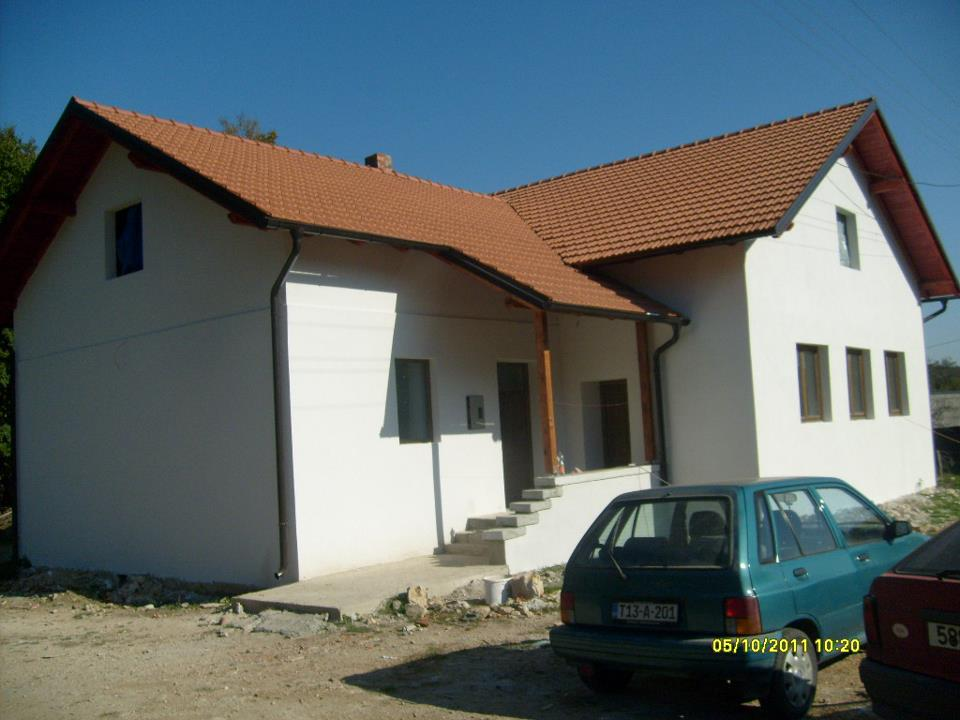
Elementary school in Jasenovi Potoci.

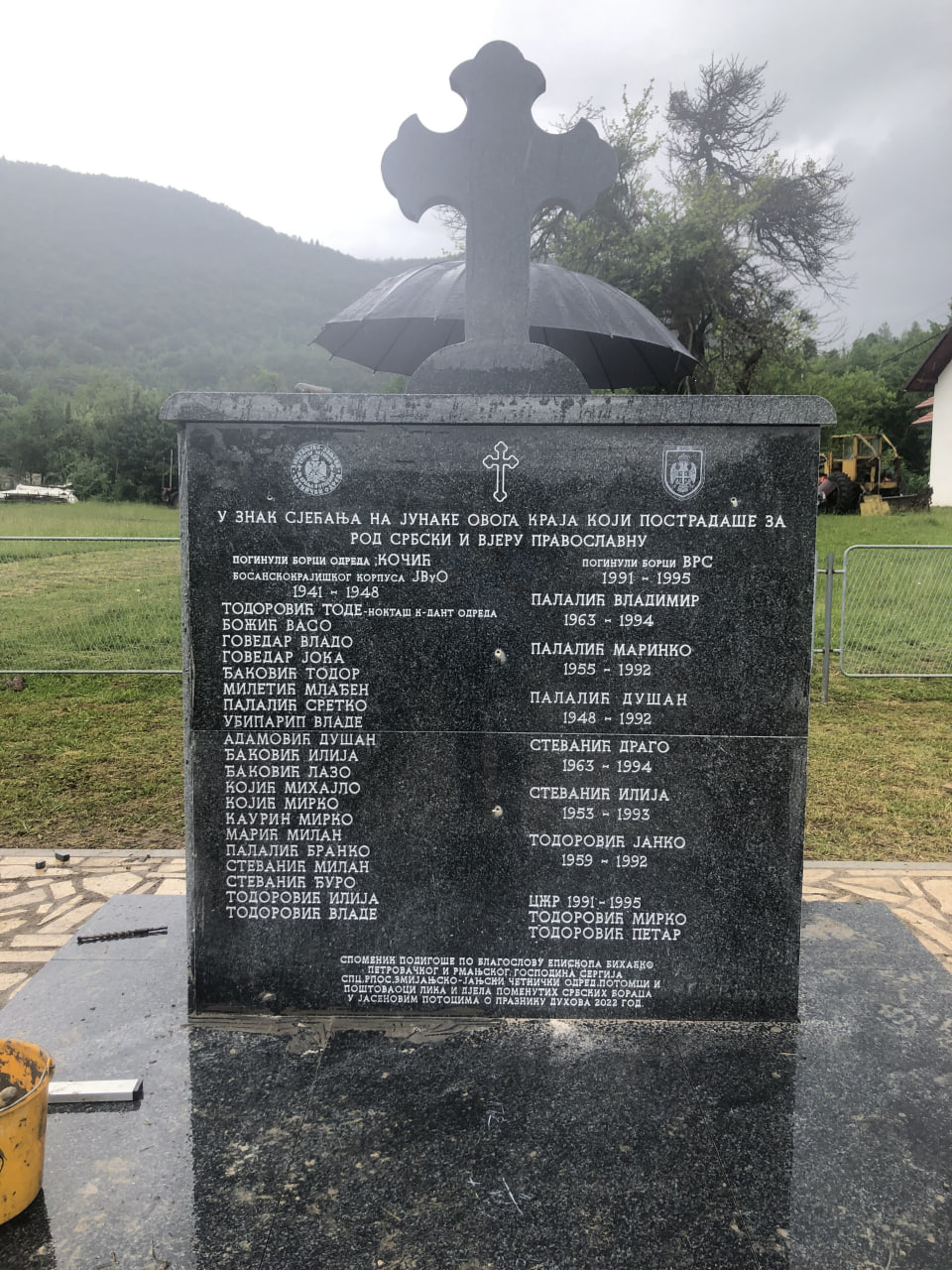
Monument dedicated to members of the Chetniks of the World War II and fallen soldiers of the Army of Bosnian Serbs.

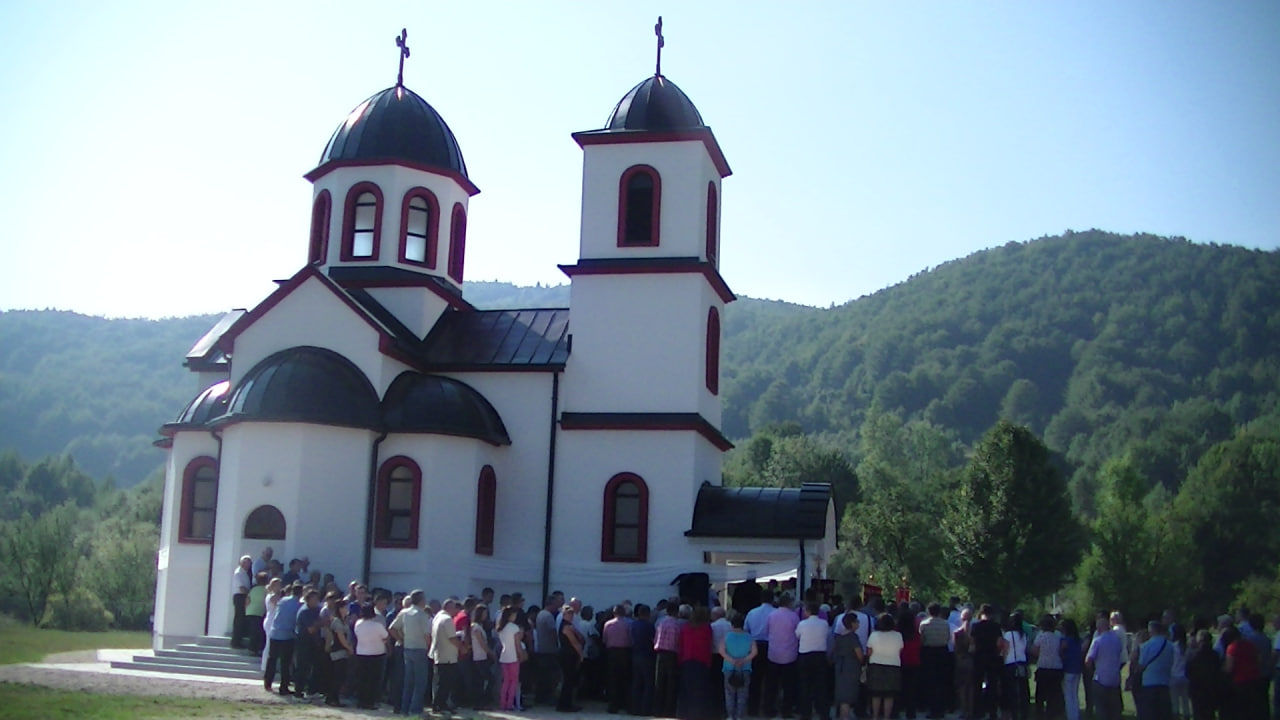
Church of the Descent of the Holy Spirit, built in 2011.

== Literature ==
Udovčić, Rade (2007). Baraći i Baraćani (in Serbian). Mrkonjić Grad: JU Kulturni Centar, Petar Kočić. ISBN 978-99938-888-0-2.
