= Oćune =

Oćune Оћуне
- Village
- Location within Bosnia and Herzegovina
- Coordinates: 44°23′24″N 17°6′27″E
- Country: Bosnia and Herzegovina
- Entity: Republika Srpska
- Municipality: Mrkonjić Grad

Population (2013)
  - Total: 225
- Time zone: UTC+1 (CET)
  - Summer (DST): UTC+2 (CEST)

Oćune (Serbian Cyrillic: Оћуне) is a village in the municipality of Mrkonjić Grad, Republika Srpska, Bosnia and Herzegovina.
