= Skakavac Waterfall (Mrkonjić Grad) =

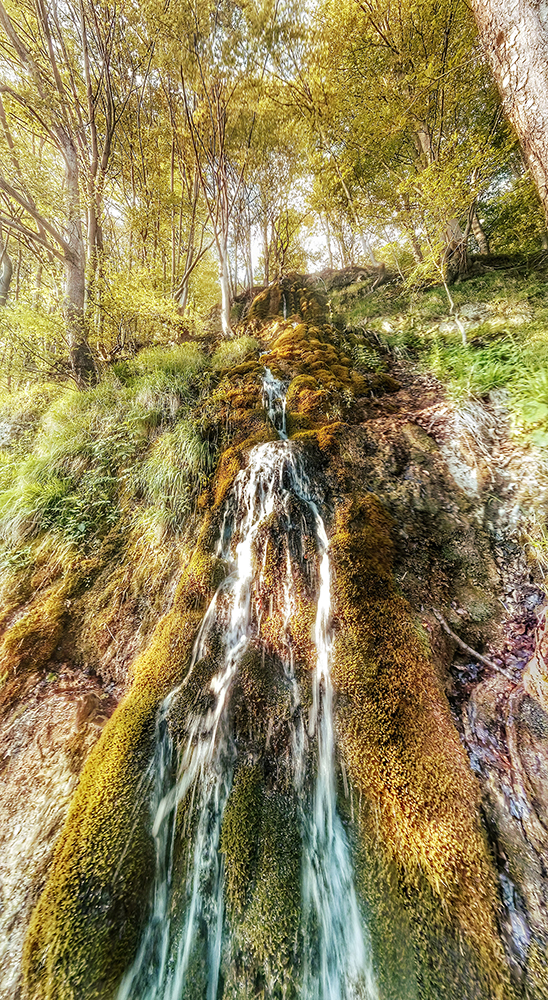
- Skakavac Waterfall

- Location within Bosnia and Herzegovina
- Location: near Balkana Lake
- Coordinates: 44°24′54.7″N 17°03′03″E
- Total height: 10 m (33 ft)
- Number of drops: 1
- Average width: ≈10 m (33 ft)
- Watercourse: Skakavac

Skakavac Waterfall is located near Mrkonjić Grad in western Bosnia and Herzegovina. River Skakavac, from which occurs the mentioned waterfall is one of the small rivers that flow into the Balkana Lake.
