= Bjelajce =

Coordinates: 44.4300°N 17.1431°E

Bjelajce Бјелајцe
- Village
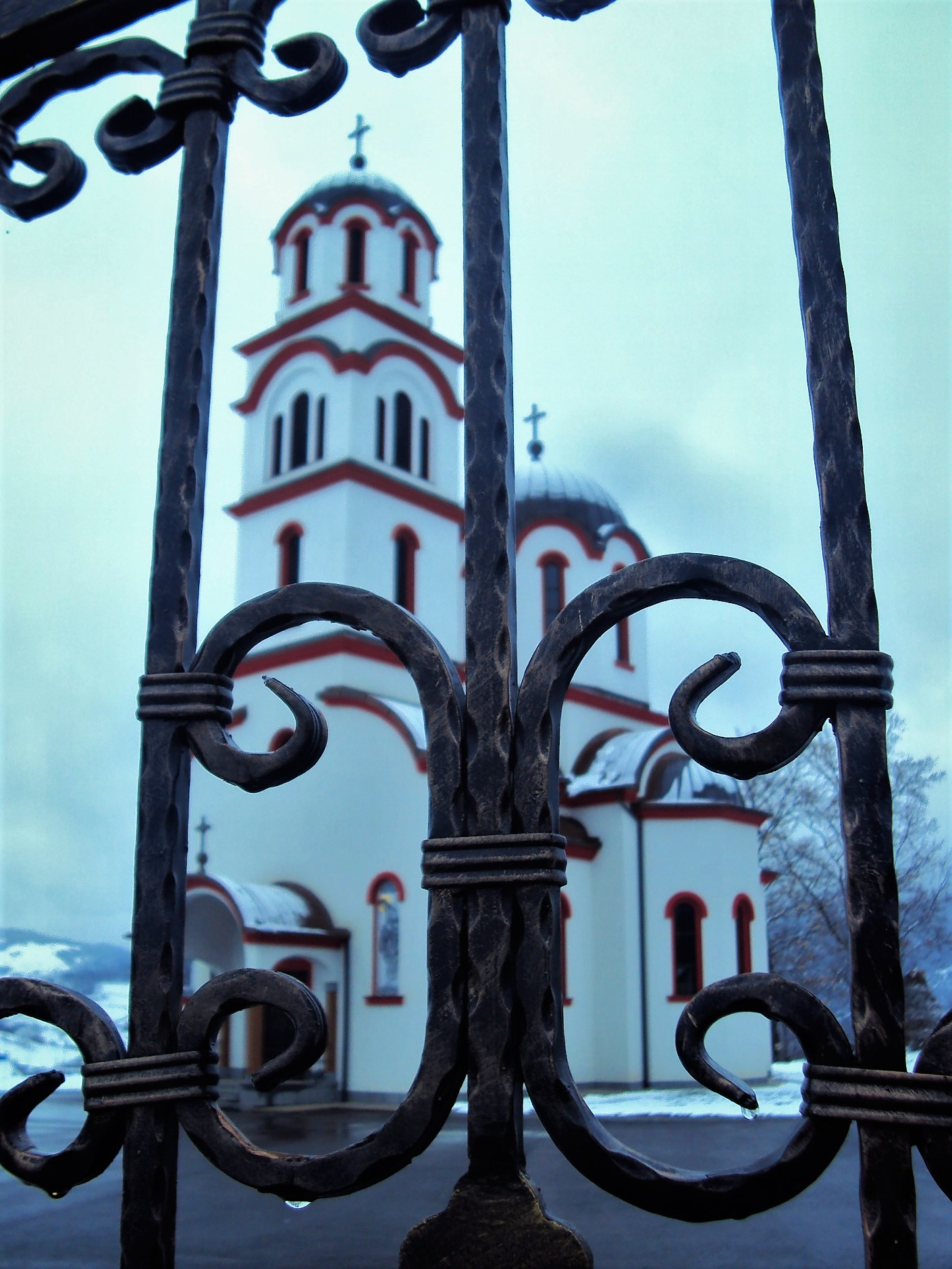

- Location within Bosnia and Herzegovina
- Country: Bosnia and Herzegovina
- Entity: Republika Srpska
- Region: Banja Luka
- Municipality: Mrkonjić Grad

Government
  - President of the Local community council: Ivan Vanja Boroja

Population (2013)
  - Total: 705
- (Settlement)
- Time zone: UTC+1 (CET)
  - Summer (DST): UTC+2 (CEST)
- Postal code: 70260

Bjelajce (Serbian Cyrillic: Бјелајцe) is a village and local community in the municipality of Mrkonjić Grad, Republika Srpska, Bosnia and Herzegovina.

The Bjelajce local community encompasses the following settlements: Bjelajce, Donji Dabrac, Liskovica and Donji Šehovci.

== Demographics ==
Ethnic makeup of Bjelajce (settlement) (Note: Percentages for 1971 and 1981 were rounded to two decimal points.)
	1971.	1981.	1991.	2013.
Bosniaks (Note: Prior to 2013, Bosniaks were counted under the name "Muslims".)	75 (7.4%)	95 (9%)	127 (13%)	9 (1.3%)
Croats	120 (11.7%)	113 (10.7%)	83 (8.5%)	5 (0.7%)
Montenegrins	2 (0.2%)	1 (0.1%)	-	-
Serbs	820 (80%)	826 (78%)	753 (76.8%)	689 (97.7%)
Yugoslavs	-	24 (2.3%)	-	-
Others	-	-	17 (1.7%)	2 (0.3%)
Total	1025	1059	980	705
