= Lisina (Bosnia and Herzegovina mountain) =

- Location within Bosnia and Herzegovina

Highest point
- Elevation: 1,467 m (4,813 ft)
- Coordinates: 44.397390°N 17.041971°E

Geography
- Location: Bosnia and Herzegovina
- Municipalities: Mrkonjić Grad and Šipovo
- Town: Mrkonjić Grad
- Parent range: Dinaric Alps

Geology
- Mountain type: Igneous

Lisina is a mountain of volcanic origin, located between the Municipality of Mrkonjić Grad and the Municipality of Šipovo, Bosnia and Herzegovina. Its highest peak, Bandira, is at a height of 1,467 m (4,813 ft).

Thanks to its geological structure, it is characterized by the great biodiversity of plant and animal species. More than 1,000 plant species, about 1,500 species of mushrooms, with particularly abundant truffles occurrence, five species of fish inhabiting mountain streams and Balkana Lakes, about ten species of amphibians and reptiles, 29 species of mammals and 107 bird species have been discovered and described in previous studies. About 360 sources (mountain springs) of drinking water were found on and around mountain, which represent significant water resources in the local area.

On its top there is a mountain lodge, Planinarski Dom "Lisina", and on the slopes of the mountain there are several villages of Mrkonjič municipality. At the foothills of Lisina, near the village of Podrašnica, there is a picnic and recreation resort, Eco Zone "Zelenkovac".
