= Ši Selo =

- Coordinates: 44.5245271°N 18.6966509°E
- Country: Bosnia and Herzegovina
- Federal entity: Federation of Bosnia and Herzegovina
- Canton: Tuzla
- City: Tuzla

Ši Selo is a local community and a former populated place within the City of Tuzla, Federation of Bosnia and Herzegovina, in Bosnia and Herzegovina.

== History ==
In 1962 it was annexed to the City of Tuzla (Official Gazette NRBIH 47/62).

== Administration ==
Ši Selo is a local community in the city of Tuzla. It belongs to the urban area of Tuzla. On December 31, 2006, according to statistical estimates, 11,792 inhabitants lived in 3,392 households.

== Population ==
Ši Selo
census year	1961.
Croats	62
Serbs	146
Muslims (today Bosniaks)	419
Yugoslavs	2
Hungarians	2
Albanians	1
others and unknown	2
in total	634

== Sources ==
- Book: "Nacionalni sastav stanovništva – Rezultati za Republiku po opštinama i naseljenim mjestima 1991", statistical bulletin no. 234, Issued by the State Statistical Office of the Republic of Bosnia and Herzegovina, Sarajevo.
- "Popis po mjesnim zajednicama" – http://www.fzs.ba/wp-content/uploads/2016/06/nacion-po-mjesnim.pdf
