= Vlasinje =

- Village
- Location within Bosnia and Herzegovina
- Coordinates: 44.4418522°N 17.1970366°E
- Country: Bosnia and Herzegovina
- Entity: Republika Srpska; Federation of Bosnia and Herzegovina
- Region Canton: Banja Luka; Central Bosnia
- Municipality: Mrkonjić Grad; Jajce

Area
  - Total: 5.46 sq mi (14.15 km^{2})

Population (2013)
  - Total: 845
  - Density: 155/sq mi (59.7/km^{2})
- Time zone: UTC+1 (CET)
  - Summer (DST): UTC+2 (CEST)

Vlasinje is a village in the municipalities of Mrkonjić Grad, Republika Srpska and Jajce, Bosnia and Herzegovina.

== Demographics ==
According to the 2013 census, its population was 845, with no one living in the Mrkonjić Grad part and primarily Bosniaks in the Jajce part.

Ethnicity in 2013
Ethnicity	Number	Percentage
Bosniaks	842	99.7%
Croats	2	0.2%
Serbs	0	0.0%
other/undeclared	1	0.1%
Total	845	100%
