= Donja Podgorja =

Donja Podgorja Доња Подгорја
- Village
- Location within Bosnia and Herzegovina
- Coordinates: 44.268775016126234°N 16.906926167504917°E
- Country: Bosnia & Herzegovina

Population
  - Total: 12

Donja Podgorja is a settlement in Bosnia and Herzegovina, in the Municipality of Mrkonjic Grad of the Republika Srpska entity.

== Name ==
Donja Podgorja derives from the combined words of Pod (under) and Gora (hill or mountain) translating to a settlement under a mountain.

== Demographics ==
According to the 1991 census, the village had a total of 64 inhabitants. Ethnic groups in the village include:

- Serbs: 64 (100%)

According to the 2013 census, the village had a total of 12 inhabitants. Ethnic groups in the village include:

- Serbs 12 (100%)
