= Baljvine =

Coordinates: 44.4800°N 17.1978°E

Baljvine Баљвине
- Village
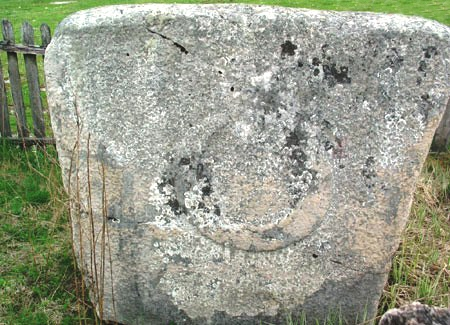
- Stećak in Baljvine

- Location in Bosnia and Herzegovina
- Country: Bosnia and Herzegovina
- Entity: Republika Srpska
- Municipality: Mrkonjić Grad

Government
  - President of the Local community council: Marinko Marković
- Lowest elevation: 495 m (1,624 ft)

Population (2013)
  - Total: 350

Baljvine (Serbian Cyrillic: Баљвине) is a village and local community located in the municipality of Mrkonjić Grad in Bosnia and Herzegovina. It is in the administrative entity Republika Srpska.

Baljvine is the only settlement within the eponymous local community.

== Geography ==
Lower Baljvine is located on a plateau above the Vrbas river at an altitude of approximately 495 m. Upper Baljvine is at 566 m. The edge of the village lies on the southeastern slope of Čemernica Mountain. Local roads connect Baljvine to the main roads M-16 and E-661.

== History ==
There are stećci (tombstones) dating back to the 14th century in the hamlet of Kucelji. In May 2003, the village was declared a cultural monument in Bosnia and Herzegovina. The Bosnian Mosque in the village was the only mosque left intact in the Banja Luka region during the Bosnian War (1992–95).

During World War II, Baljvine was a stop on the supply line for Yugoslav Partisan units operating in Central Bosnia. The route passed through the Vrhovine highlands from Prnjavor via Čečava, Klupe (Borja), Maslovare and Skender Vakuf to Baljvine and from there to the entire Bosanska Krajina region. This route was used by many groups, including the "people's government" and military delegations. It was especially useful for units of the 11th Krajina Division of the Partisans, who used it as a message stop. It was used for transport by packhorse of food and livestock, donated by the people of the župa (district) to aid partisan units and others in Bosanska Krajina. Military supplies for the Partisans and their supporters also flowed in the opposite direction, from Mrkonjić Grad across the Vrbas. The route was used by the League of Communists of Yugoslavia, students on military-political and medical courses, and couriers who delivered reports and messages. The Chetniks had links to the Ustashe and to the Germans who were permitted to operate a radio station and intelligence points in Chetnik territory: all this posed a constant danger to users of this route and to supplies bound for the Divisional hospital.

== Population ==
Baljvine
Census Year	2013	1991	1981	1971
Muslims	245 (70%)	699 (61.31%)	654 (53.34%)	593 (49.41%)
Serbs	104 (29.7%)	438 (38.42%)	565 (46.08%)	601 (50.08%)
Croats	0 (0%)	0	0	2 (0.16%)
Yugoslavs	-	1 (0.08%)	7 (0.57%)	2 (0.16%)
Others and unknown	1 (0.3%)	2 (0.17%)	0	2 (0.16%)
Total	350	1,140	1,226	1,200
