= Gerzovo =

- Герзово
- Location within Bosnia and Herzegovina
- Coordinates: 44.3123203311646°N 16.993723316383964°E

Government
  - President of the Local community council: Milenko Jakica

Population
  - Total: 268
- Demonym(s): (sg.) Gerzovac (pl.) Gerzovci

Gerzovo (Serbian Cyrillic:Герзово) is a settlement and local community located in the municipality of Mrkonjić Grad, Bosnia and Herzegovina.

Aside from Gerzovo, the eponymous local community also encompasses the settlement of Trnovo.

== Geography ==
Gerzovo is located in the southeastern portion of the Mrkonjić Grad Municipality bordering Šipovo. Gerzovo is situated under a hill and is primarily a field.

== Name ==
This settlement wasn't always named Gerzovo, in the 1528 Ottoman Defter it was labeled as Pr'ovo (Прхово) or Popovići. The Slavic traveler Benedikt Kuripešić concluded in his Book (Travel Writings through Bosnia, Serbia, Bulgaria, and Rumelia;1530) that the settlement's name was Gerzovo. In correlation with Atanastije Grgićević in the description of the Klis Sanjak mentions Sokograd and Gerzovo together. Gerzovo itself is derived from the Duke Gerzelez Alija (Turkish: Gürz Ilyas) whose turbe until recently was located in Gerzovo, on Breščić, and who died there at the end of the 15th century.

== History ==
In late May 1463, Mahmud Pasha launched an invasion of Bosnia with 20,000 Soldiers directly heading towards Jajce through Gerzovo, Sokoc, Pecka, Medina, and Ključ. After the Turkish Conquest of Bosnia, The Nahija of Sokol or The Nahija of Gerzovo (Note: In Serbo Croatian, the Nahija was named Nahija Sokol or Nahija Gerzovo, In Cyrillic; (Serbian Cyrillic: Нахија Сокол, Нахија Герзово)) was a Nahija formed in 1528 that controlled territory from Pliva to the Sana river. During this time period, the settlement of Pecka and Vrbljani was first mentioned. In the Turkish defters, it is hard to identify the correlation between censuses in that period to now due to name changes. The settlement Gerzovo was named Prhovo (Прово) while the settlement Pecka was listed as Kozara (Козара). It can be confirmed that all of the settlements around Baraći were part of the Sokolac Nahija. During the Nahija of Gerzovo, Sokograd was the administrative center of the Nahija.

== Nahija of Gerzovo ==
=== Toponyms ===
In the Župa of Gerzovo, Many settlements were inhabited during the Roman Empire. Pecka was (Sarnade) Sarići was (Saritte near Šipovo) Jezero was (Indenea) and Majdan or Mrkonjić was (Balole)

== Demographics ==
Ethnic Composition-Settlement Gerzovo
	2013	1991	1981	1971
In Total	268 (100,0%)	679 (100,0%)	914 (100,0%)	1,104 (100,0%)
Serbs	268 (100,0%)	673 (99,12%)	900 (98,47%)	1,085 (98,28%)
Others		6 (0,884%)	1 (0,109%)	7 (0,634%)
Yugoslavs			6 (0,656%)	9 (0,815%)
Montenegrins			5 (0,547%)	
Bosniaks			1 (0,109%)	
Croats			1 (0,109%)	3(0,272%)

Early Censuses of Settlements in Gerzovo (Note: In the 1921, 1931 censuses of Yugoslavia they did not list individual settlements of Gerzovo rather combined them into one name as Gerzovo.)
Settlement:	1879	1885	1895	1910	1921	1931
Brdo	417	473	542	670		
Gromile	226	220	284	379		
Podkraj	275	251	285	347		
Podgorje	206	270	337	543		
In Total	1,124	1,214	1,448	1,939	1,783	5,203
