= Gornja Podgorja =

Gornja Podgorja is a settlement in Bosnia and Herzegovina, located in the Municipality of Mrkonjic Grad of the Republika Srpska entity.

== Name ==
Gornja Podgorja derives from the combined words of Pod (under) and Gora (hill or mountain) translating to a settlement under a mountain.

== Demographics ==
According to the 1991 census, the village had a total of 106 inhabitants. Ethnic groups in the village include:

- Serbs: 106 (100%)

According to the 2013 census, the village had a total of 46 inhabitants. Ethnic groups in the village include:

- Serbs 46 (100%)
