= Mlinište (Mrkonjić Grad) =

Mlinište Млиниште
- Village
- Location within Bosnia and Herzegovina
- Coordinates: 44.26478111930805°N 16.838984413987816°E

Population (2013)
  - Total: 6

Mlinište is a settlement of Bosnia and Herzegovina, in the Municipality of Mrkonjić Grad of the Republika Srpska entity.

== Name ==
Mlinište was once called Kaldrma and it got the name Mlinište by the flat mills in the area.

== Demographics ==
According to the 1991 census, the village had a total of 19 inhabitants. Ethnic groups in the village include:

- Serbs: 19 (100%)

According to the 2013 census, the village had a total of 6 inhabitants. Ethnic groups in the village include:

- Serbs 6 (100%)
