= Vrbljani =

Vrbljani Врбљани
- Village
- Location within Bosnia and Herzegovina
- Coordinates: 43°42′N 17°58′E
- Country: Bosnia and Herzegovina
- Entity: Federation of Bosnia and Herzegovina
- Canton: Herzegovina-Neretva
- Municipality: Konjic

Area
  - Total: 2.37 sq mi (6.15 km^{2})

Population (2013)
  - Total: 63
  - Density: 27/sq mi (10/km^{2})
- Time zone: UTC+1 (CET)
  - Summer (DST): UTC+2 (CEST)

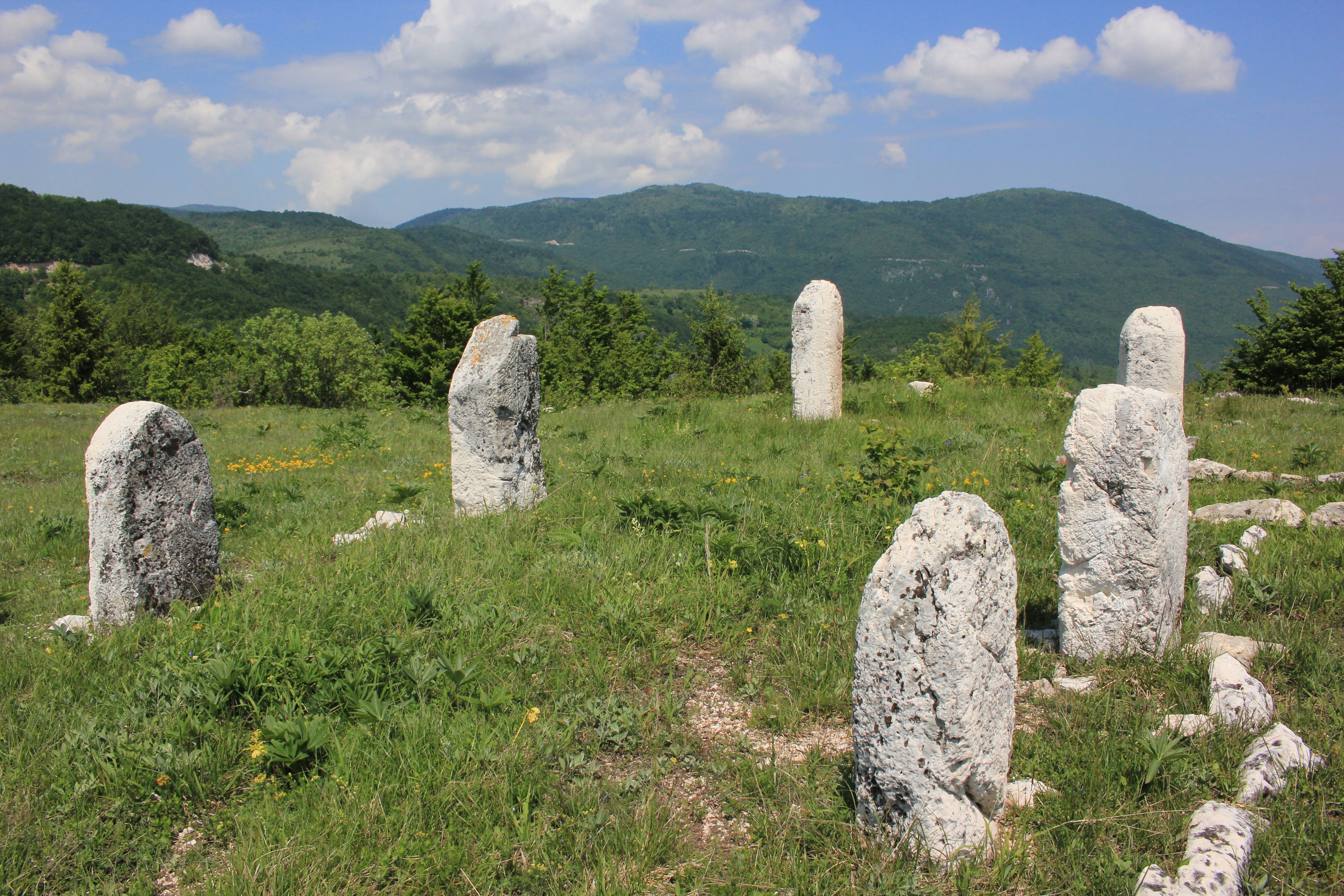
Kaursko necropolis near Dejčići, Bosnia

Vrbljani (Cyrillic: Врбљани) is a village in the municipality of Konjic, Bosnia and Herzegovina.

== Demographics ==
According to the 2013 census, its population was 63, all Bosniaks.
