= Balkana Lake =

Lake in Bosnia and Herzegovina

Balkana
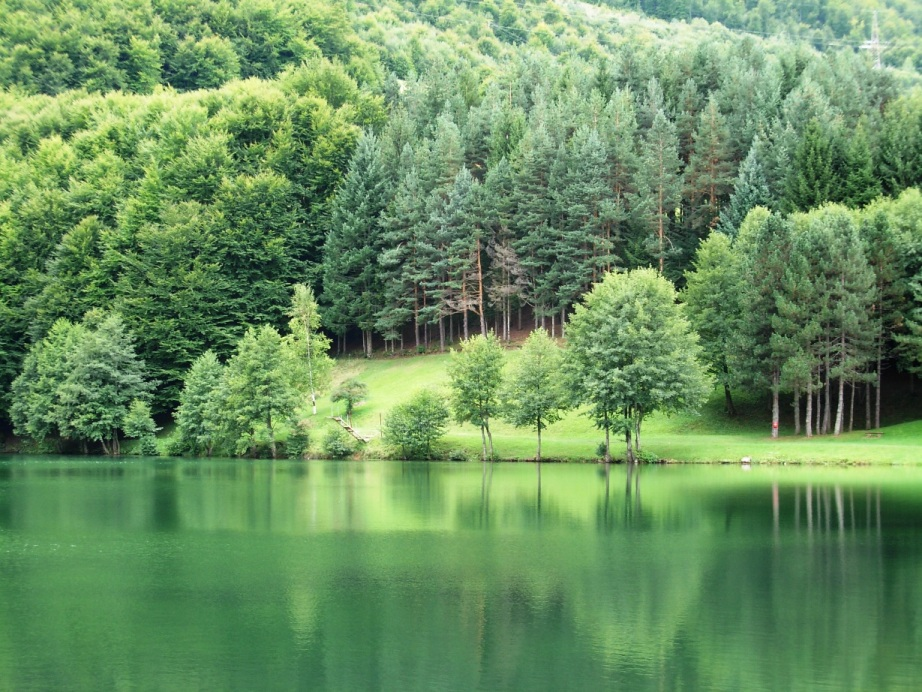

- Location of Lake Balkana
- Interactive map of Balkana
- Location: Mrkonjić Grad
- Coordinates: 44°24′55″N 17°02′59″E
- Basin countries: Bosnia and Herzegovina
- Surface area: 56.000 m^{2} (602.78 sq ft)

Balkana (Bosnian/Serbian cyrillic: Балкана) is an artificial lake located on the slopes of Lisina mountain, in the municipality of Mrkonjić Grad, entity of Republika Srpska, in the western part of Bosnia and Herzegovina. The lake, actually, consists of two separate, though connected via small outcomes, basins, upper as larger and lower as smaller, with very small difference in water tables levels. Total area of both basins is 56.000 m^{2} (602.78 sq ft). Balkana gets its waters from several mountain springs and two small mountain streams, Cjepalo and Skakavac, while its outflow is Crna Rijeka (English: Black River), which runs through Mrkonjić Grad from south to north, and joins Vrbas after 17 km (11 mi).

== Name ==
Balkana means of the Balkan peninsula.

== See also ==
- List of lakes of Bosnia and Herzegovina
