= Local communities in Bosnia and Herzegovina =

Administrative body for an area

A local community (Serbo-Croatian: mjesna zajednica, мјесна заједница) is the lowest-level administrative division in Bosnia and Herzegovina, including the Federation of Bosnia and Herzegovina, Republika Srpska and Brčko District. It is the fourth-order division in the Federation and third-order in Republika Srpska, being below municipalities in the hierarchy, except in Brčko District, where they act as a second-order division, being below the District itself.

== Government structure ==
It is an administrative body of a single territorial unit that can include one or several populated places or parts of a populated place that constitutes a territorial whole. The government of a local community consists of a local community council and its president, or a council and an assembly of citizens. In the latter case, which exists in only five municipalities, the councils act as an executive body appointed by the assembly of citizens. Additionally, in Brčko District, a steering board is also present.

== Formation ==
A local community is established on the initiative of the municipality president or a mayor or municipal/city council as well as civic associations, while the decision on the establishment is reserved for the municipal/city council. In the Federation of Bosnia and Herzegovina, legal communities are considered to be legal entities. The initiative to form a new local community can be submitted by citizens (at least 10% of the citizens residing in the proposed local community in Republika Srpska), an association of citizens (in the Federation of Bosnia and Herzegovina), municipality council (at least one third of the representatives in the council in Republika Srpska) or municipal mayor. In Brčko District, new local communities are formed by the District assembly, with the participation of 50% plus one inhabitants of the local community for it to be formed.

== Statistic ==
In total, there are 1,451 local communities within the Federation of Bosnia and Herzegovina. Out of 79 local self-governments or municipalities/cities, 78 of them have established local communities.

== See also ==
- Župa

== Bibliography ==
- Jusić, Mirna (2014). Mjesne zajednice u Bosni i Hercegovini: Izazovi i perspektive institucionalnog razvoja [Local communities in Bosnia and Herzegovina: Challenges and perspectives of institutional development] (in Serbo-Croatian). Sarajevo: Analitika.
