= Mrkonjić Grad =

Mrkonjić Grad Мркоњић Град
- Town and municipality
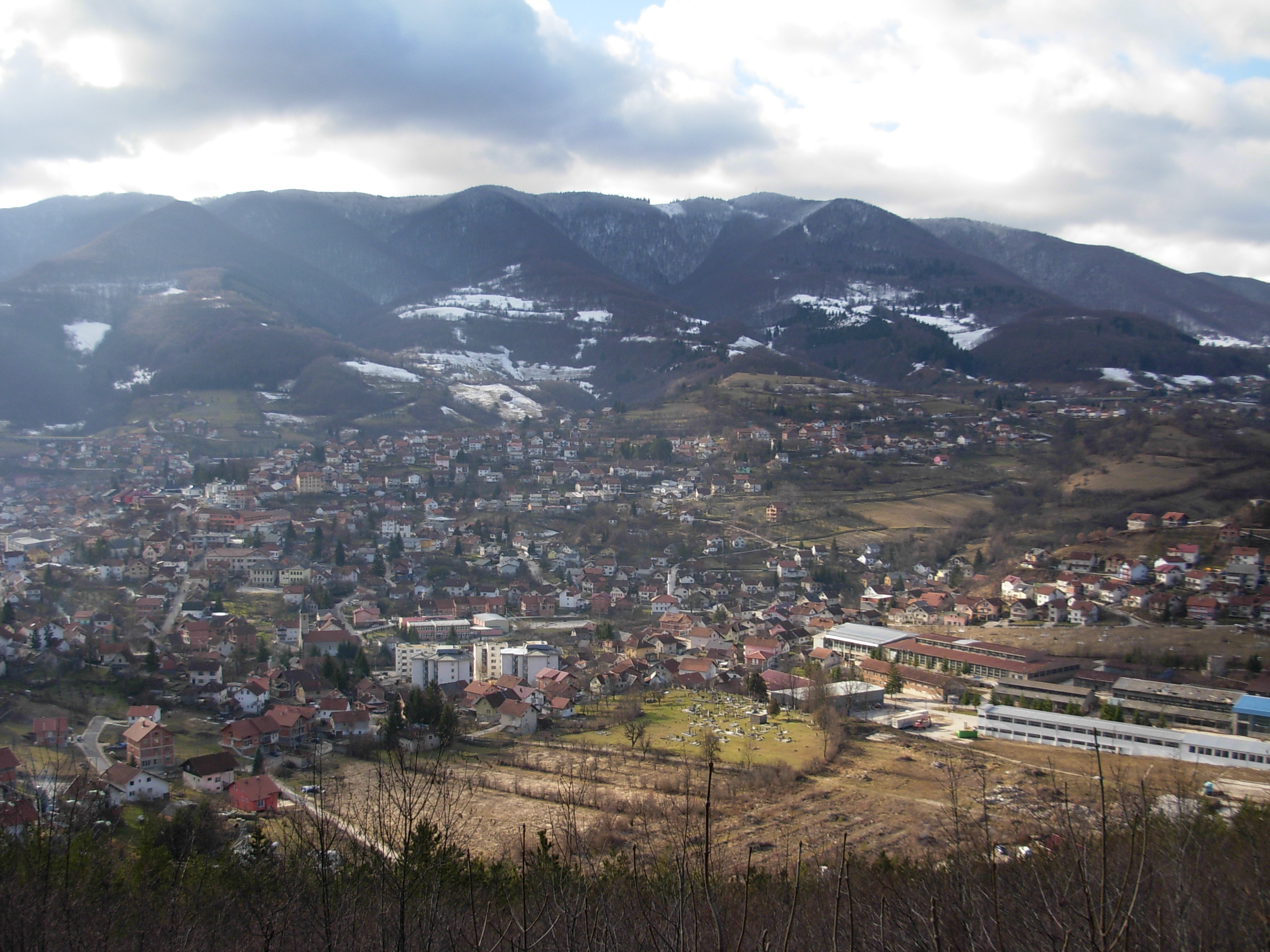
- Mrkonjić Grad

- Coat of arms

- Location of Mrkonjić Grad within Bosnia and Herzegovina

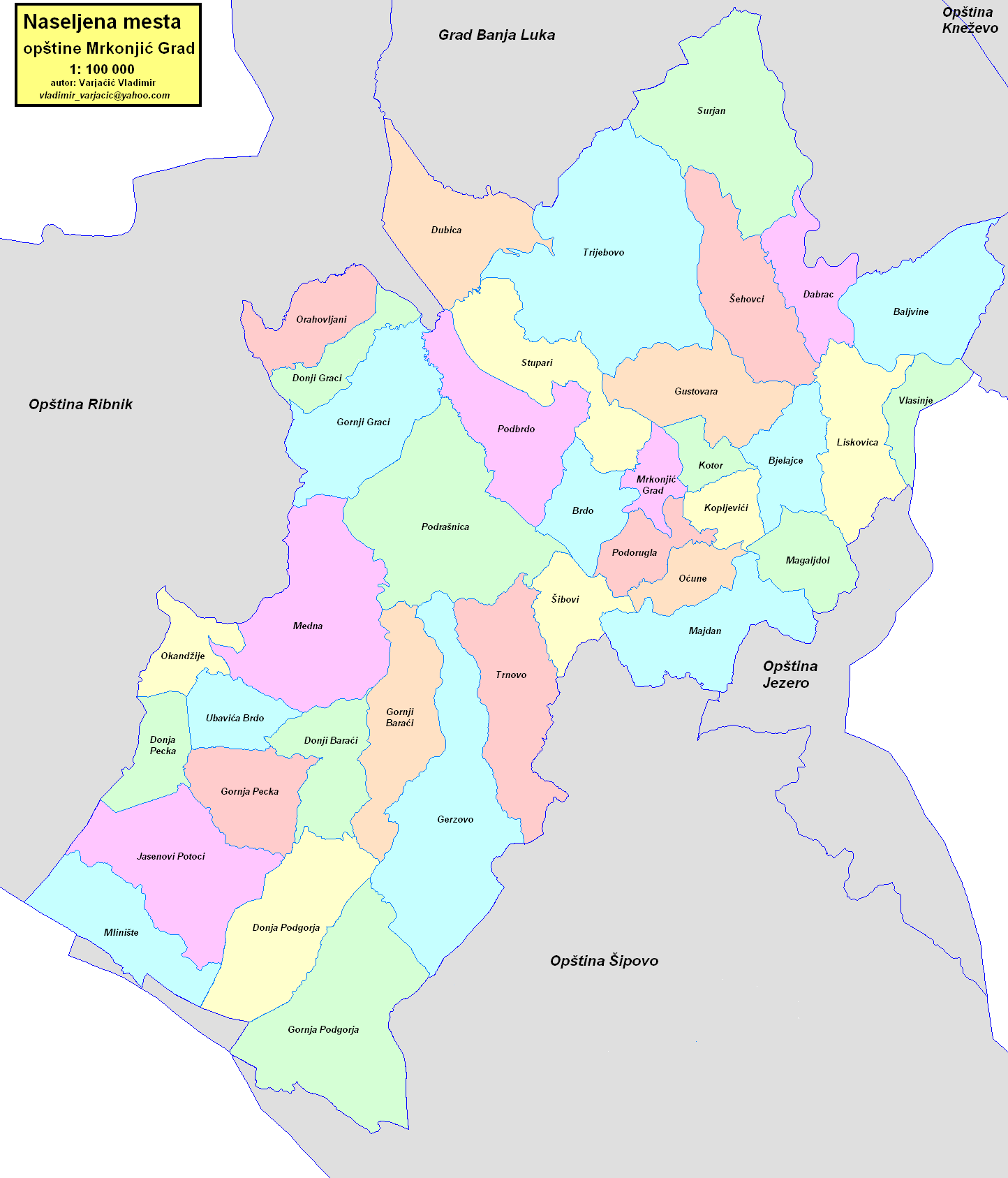
- Coordinates: 44°25′N 17°05′E
- Country: Bosnia and Herzegovina
- Entity: Republika Srpska
- Geographical region: Bosanska Krajina

Government
  - Municipal mayor: Dragan Vođević (SNSD)

Area
  - Total: 677.43 km^{2} (261.56 sq mi)

Population (2013 census)
  - Total: 16,671
  - Density: 24.609/km^{2} (63.737/sq mi)
- Time zone: UTC+1 (CET)
  - Summer (DST): UTC+2 (CEST)
- Area code: 50

Mrkonjić Grad (Serbian Cyrillic: Мркоњић Град, pronounced [mr̩koɲit͡ɕ grad]) is a town and municipality in Republika Srpska, Bosnia and Herzegovina. It is located in the Bosanska Krajina region, between Banja Luka and Jajce. As of 2013, the municipality has a population of 16,671 inhabitants, while the town of Mrkonjić Grad has a population of 7,915 inhabitants.

The municipality consists of the following 22 local communities: Baljvine, Bjelajce, Baraći, Gerzovo, Gustovara, Podgorija, Magaljdol, Medna, Gornja Pecka, Gornji Šehovci, Stupari, Podrašnica, Podbrdo, Majdan, Gornji Graci, Orahovljani, Centar, Brkića Bašta, Kamenica, Novo Naselje, Zborište and Podorugla.

== Name ==
The town changed its name several times in history: Gornje Kloke, Novo Jajce, Varcarev Vakuf, Varcar Vakuf, and ultimately the present one. The last renaming took place in 1924 after King Peter I of Serbia, who had taken the nom de guerre "Mrkonjić" while fighting in the uprising (1875–78) against the Ottoman Empire. During the time between the Croatian troops conquering the city in operation Južni Potez and the Dayton agreement, the town was briefly known as "Matijaševo" after Andrija Matijaš Pauk, the deputy commander of the Croatian 4th guards brigade who was killed while entering the town.

== History ==
From 1929 to 1941, Mrkonjić Grad was part of the Vrbas Banovina of the Kingdom of Yugoslavia.

When the German and Italian Zones of Influence were revised on 24 June 1942, Varcar Vakuf fell in Zone III, administered civilly by Croatia and militarily by Croatia and Germany.

In World War II, the town became renowned by the first meeting of ZAVNOBiH on 25 November 1943, when Bosnia and Herzegovina was proclaimed as a common republic of Serbs, Croats and Muslims.

During the Bosnian War from 1992 to 1995, the town was within the territory controlled by ethnic Serbs. The town is also known for the incident where the USAF lost one F-16 piloted by Scott O'Grady on 2 June 1995. He was stranded in the area for six days before being rescued by the US Marines. From 8 to 12 October 1995, Mrkonjić Grad was in the hands of the Croatian Army (HV) and the Croatian Defence Council (HVO). Traces of various forms of torture were found on the bodies of murdered Serbs in the war crimes committed by Croatian forces. The livestock in the municipality was stolen or killed. All machines and equipment from the factories in Mrkonjić Grad were taken away or destroyed by Croatian troops. In the territory of Mrkonjić Grad, there was hardly any residential building that was not damaged or looted. No one from the Croatian side has been held legally accountable for these crimes. After the Dayton Peace Agreement the town was assigned to the entity of Republika Srpska. As a consequence, the Croat population of the town had no choice but to leave, and there are very few Croats living in Mrkonjić today, most of them elderly. In 1996, a mass grave containing the bodies of 181 Serbs—mostly civilians—was uncovered in Mrkonjić Grad. Almost all were killed by Bosnian Croat and Muslim forces in late 1995.

Bosnian Serbs committed a massacre of 28 Croat and Bosniak civilians, who were abducted from their homes in Mrkonjić Grad, and executed in Oborci, on 13 September 1995.

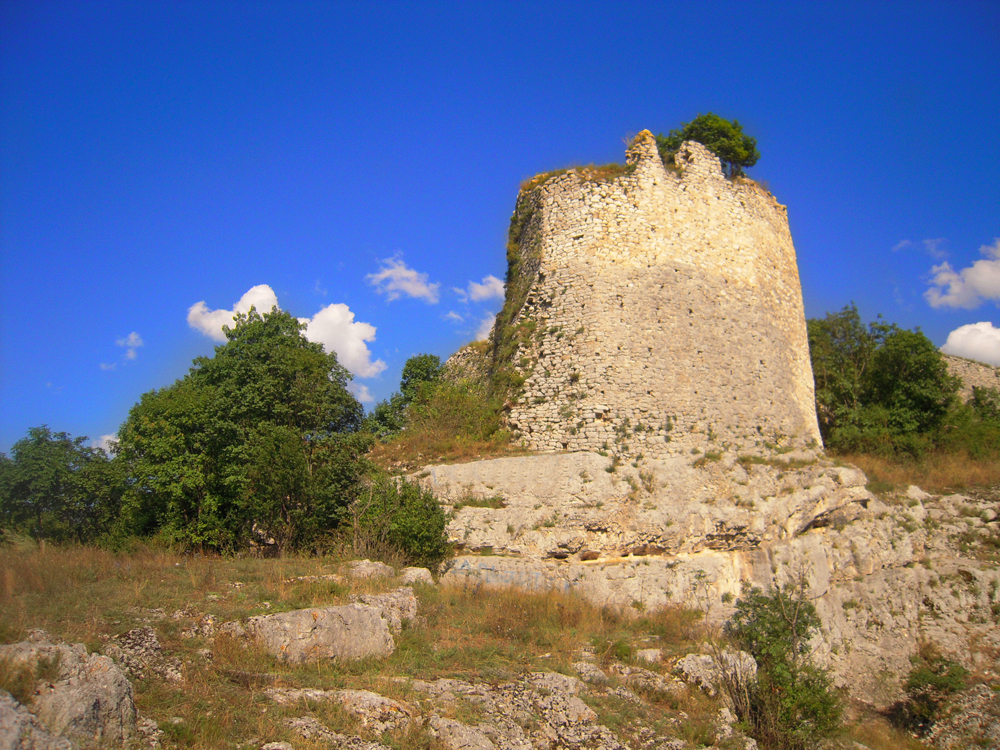
Bočac fortress

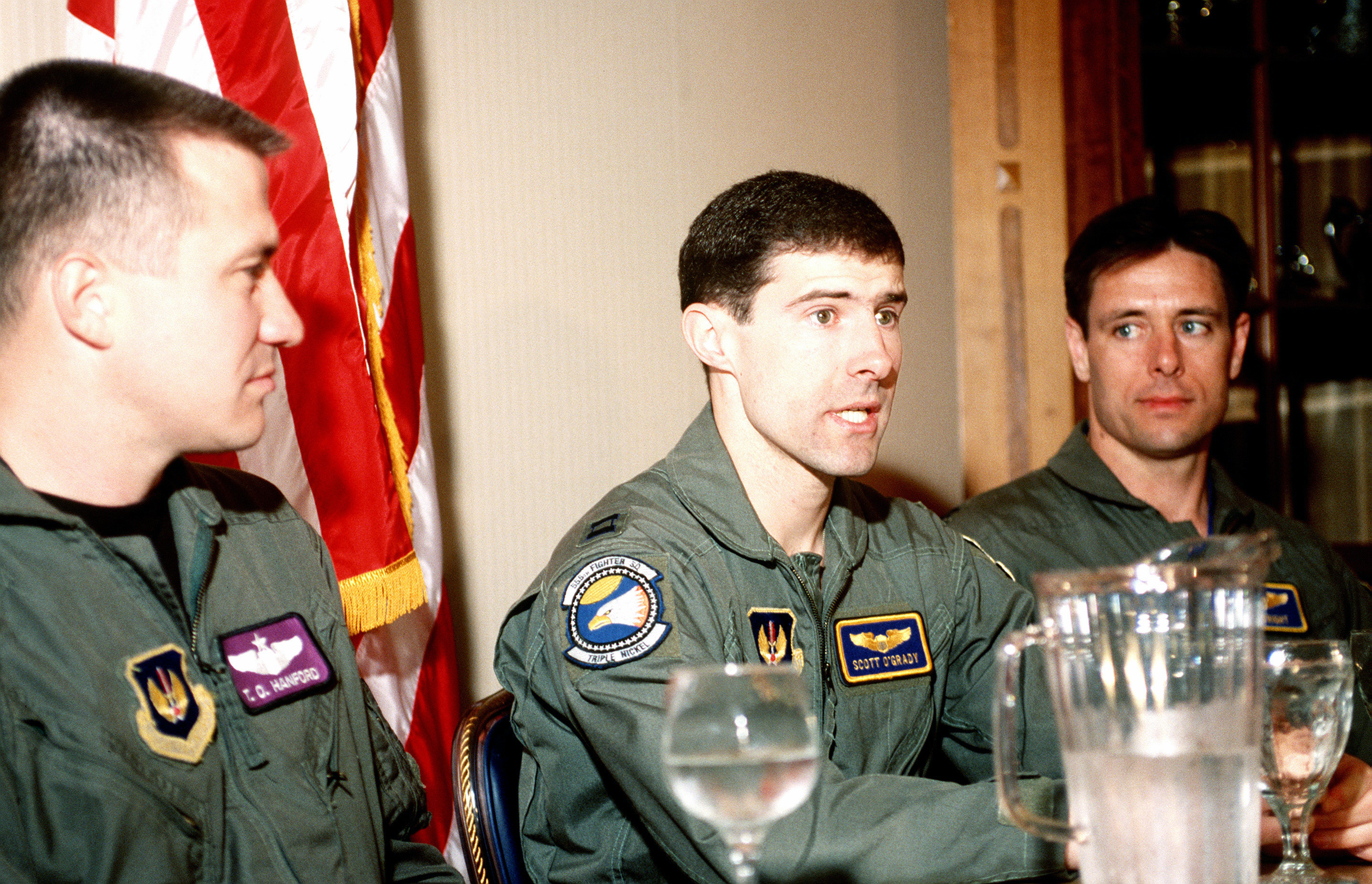
American pilot Scott O'Grady was shot down by the Bosnian Serb army in the Bosnian war

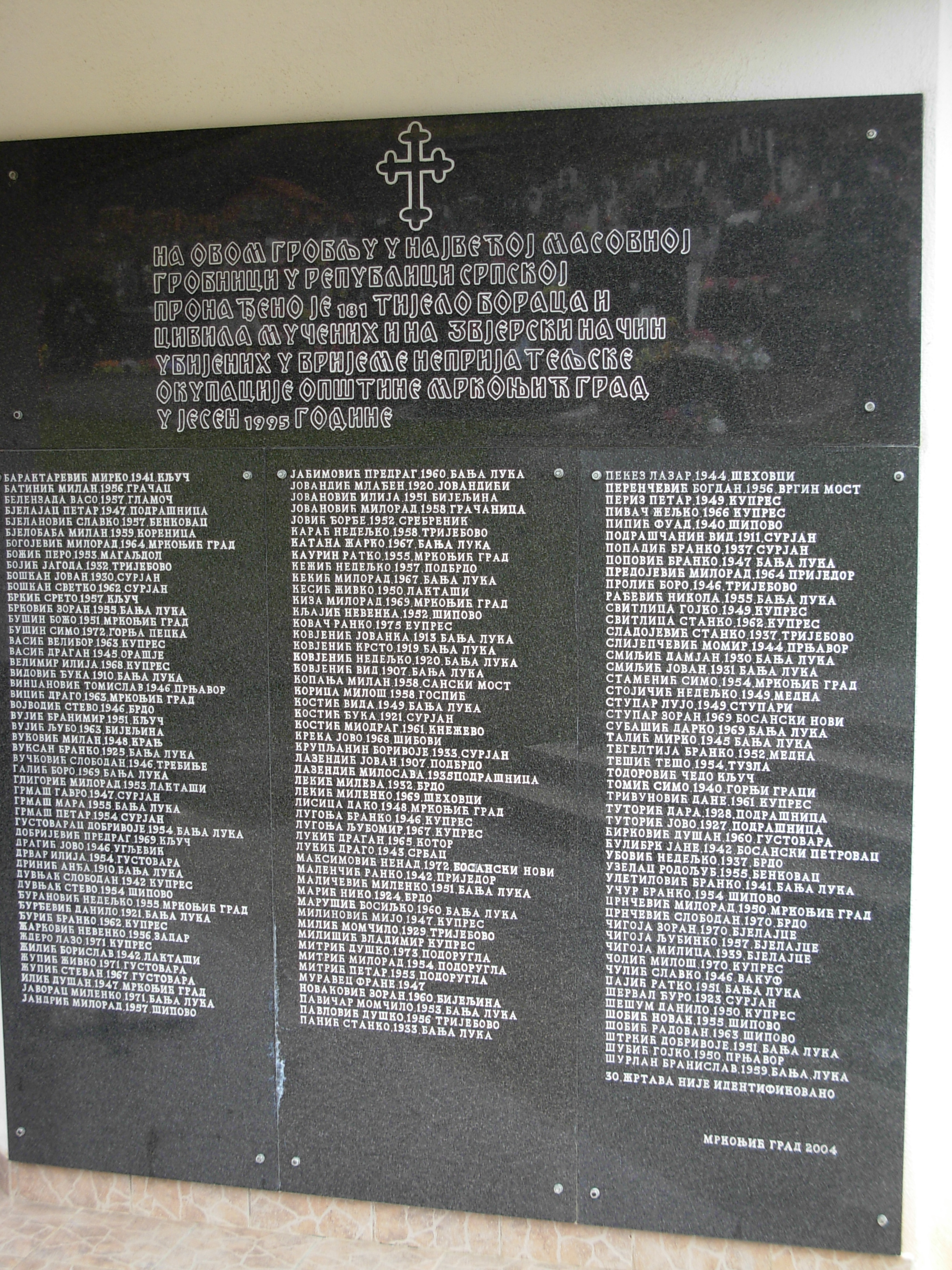
Plaque commemorating the victims thrown into a mass grave by Croat forces

== Demographics ==
=== Population ===
Population of settlements – Mrkonjić Grad municipality
| | Settlement | 1910. | 1921. | 1931. | 1948. | 1953. | 1961. | 1971. | 1981. | 1991. | 2013. |
| | Total | 20,620 | | 27,014 | 29,178 | 31,127 | 30,949 | 30,159 | 29,684 | 26,278 | 16,671 |
| 1 | Baljvine | | | | | | | | | 1,140 | 333 |
| 2 | Bjelajce | | | | | | | | | 980 | 693 |
| 3 | Brdo | | | | | | | | | 587 | 548 |
| 4 | Donji Baraći | | | | | | | | | 524 | 287 |
| 5 | Donji Graci | | | | | | | | | 358 | 206 |
| 6 | Gerzovo | | | | | | | | | 679 | 256 |
| 7 | Gornji Graci | | | | | | | | | 926 | 556 |
| 8 | Gustovara | | | | | | | | | 428 | 208 |
| 9 | Kopljevići | | | | | | | | | 489 | 296 |
| 10 | Kotor | | | | | | | | | 443 | 311 |
| 11 | Majdan | | | | | | | | | 946 | 408 |
| 12 | Medna | | | | | | | | | 791 | 221 |
| 13 | Mrkonjić Grad | | | | 2,249 | | 2,770 | 4,089 | 6,602 | 8,422 | 7,915 |
| 14 | Oćune | | | | | | | | | 447 | 215 |
| 15 | Orahovljani | | | | | | | | | 463 | 263 |
| 16 | Podbrdo | | | | | | | | | 991 | 731 |
| 17 | Podorugla | | | | | | | | | 849 | 921 |
| 18 | Podrašnica | | | | | | | | | 1,096 | 733 |
| 19 | Šehovci | | | | | | | | | 642 | 251 |
| 20 | Stupari | | | | | | | | | 435 | 288 |
| 21 | Trijebovo | | | | | | | | | 509 | 211 |
| 22 | Jasenovi Potoci | | | | | | | | | 284 | 98 |

=== Ethnic composition ===
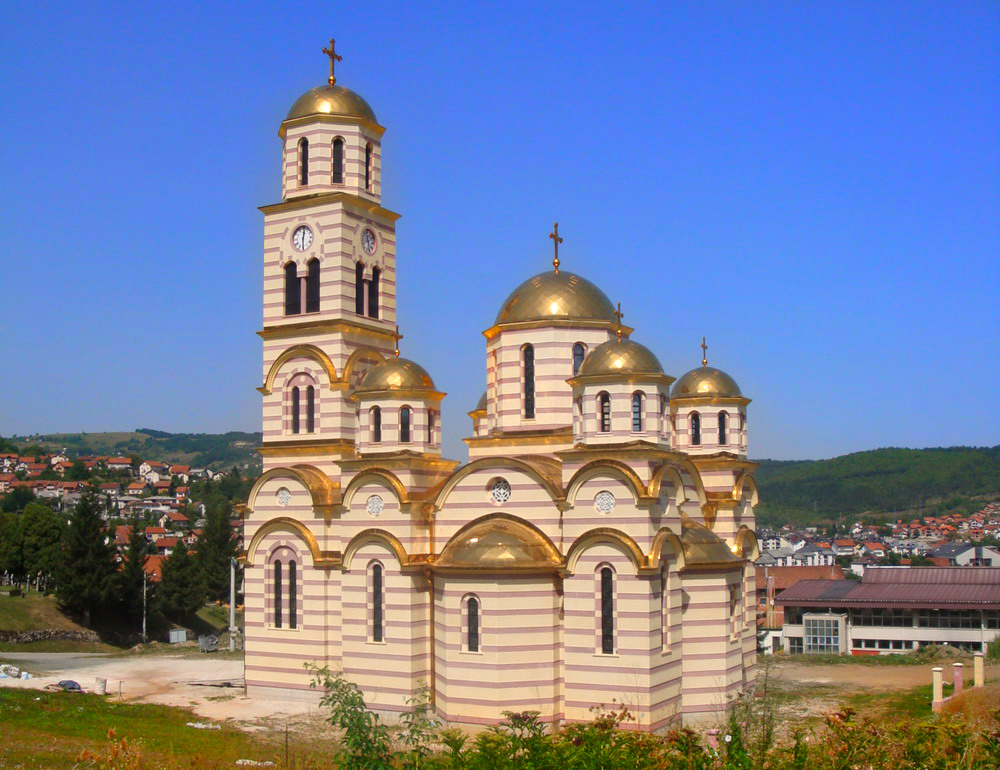
Church of Saint Sava

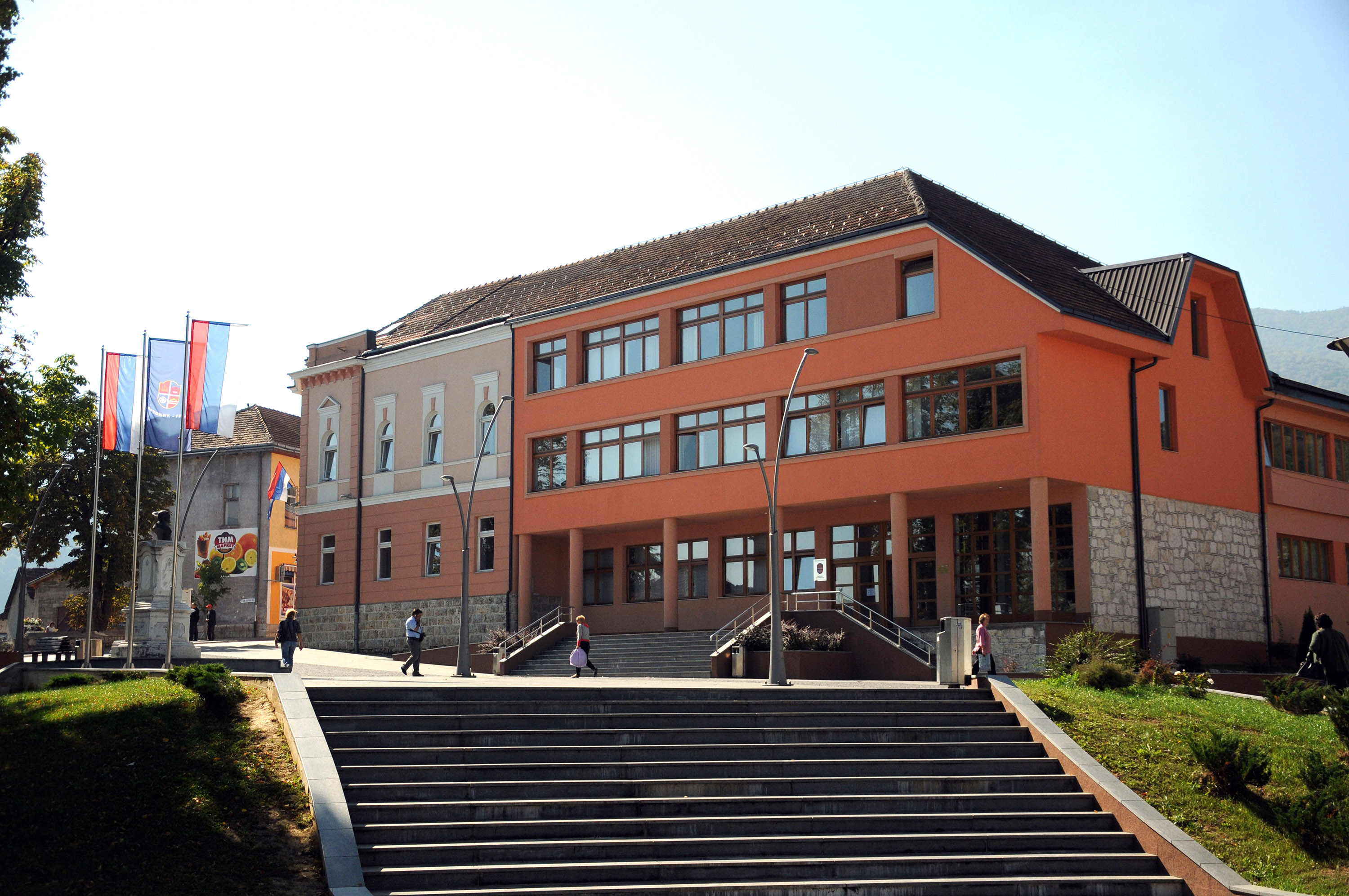
City assembly building

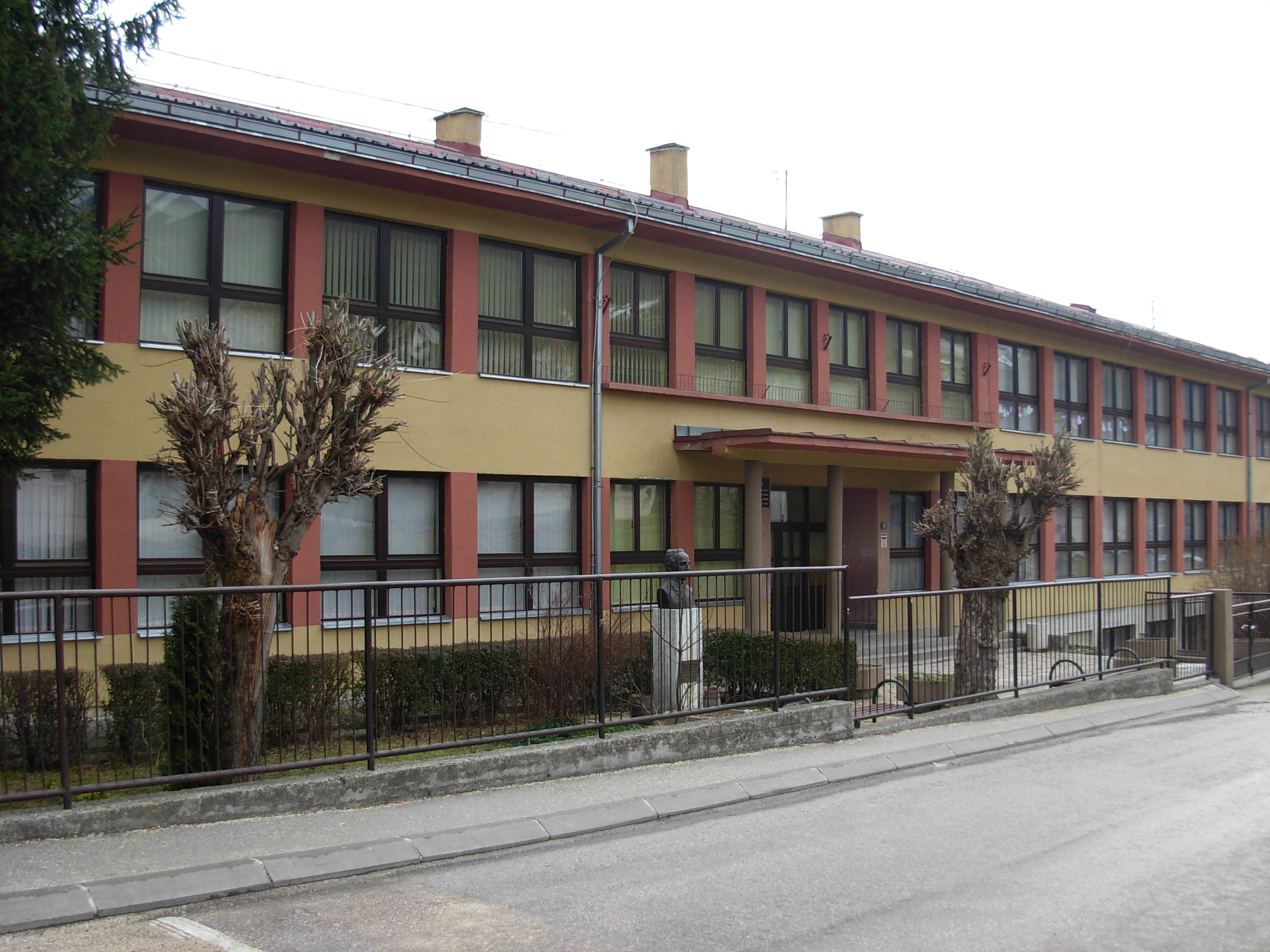
Petar Kočić elementary school

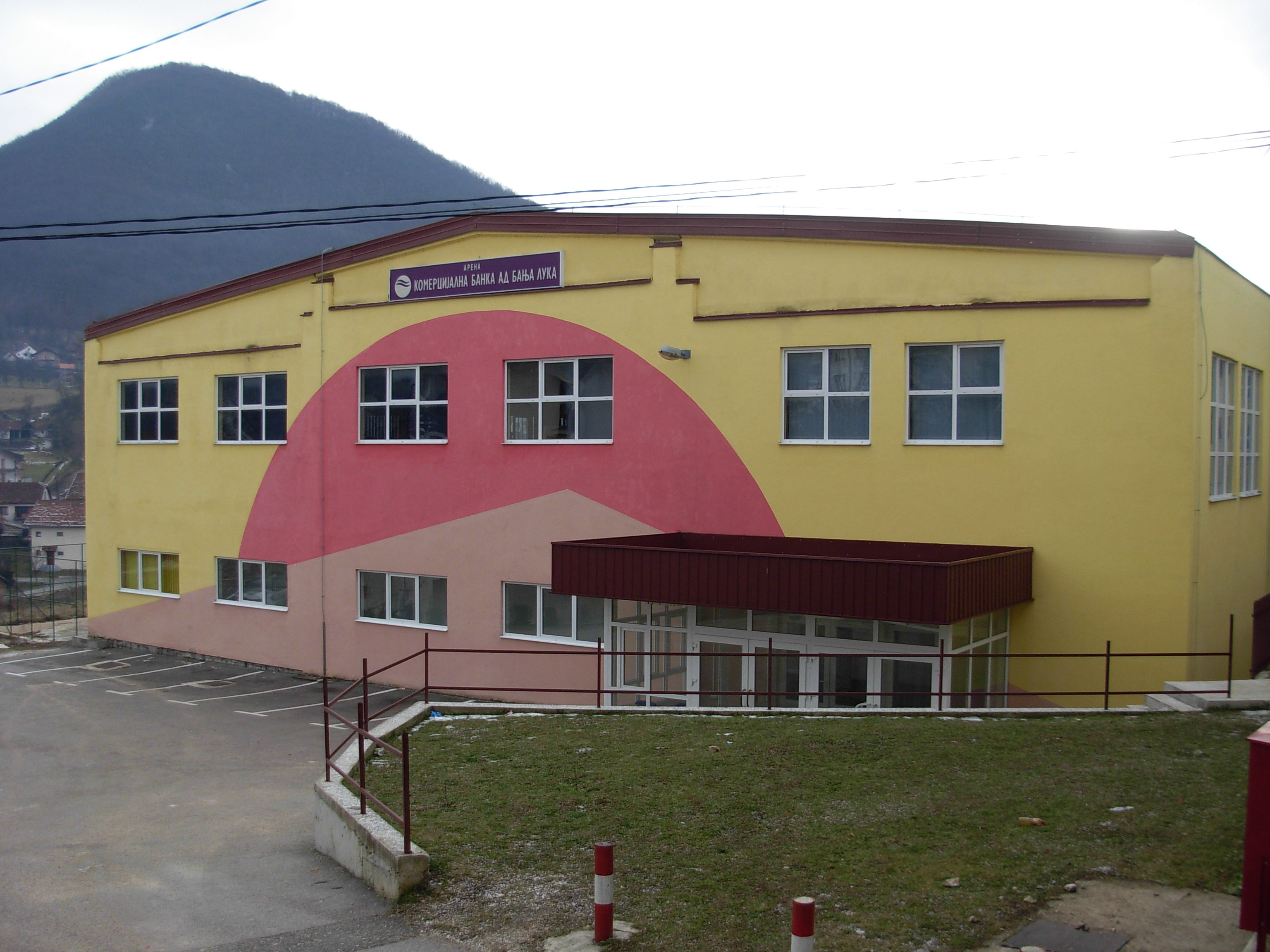
Sports hall

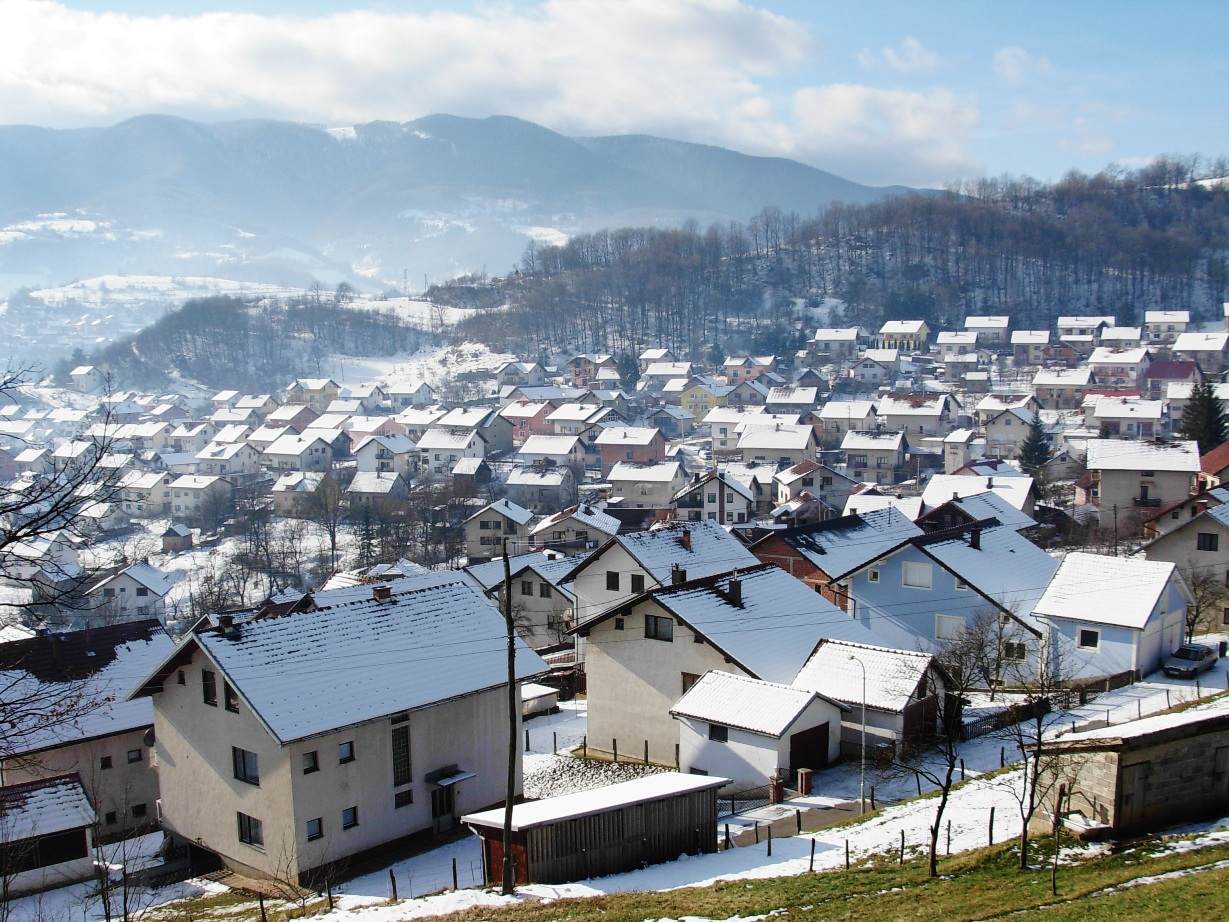
Many of the damaged houses that had devastated the area were rebuilt after the war

Ethnic composition – Mrkonjić Grad town
| | 2013. | 1991. | 1981. | 1971. |
| Total | 7,915 (100,0%) | 8,422 (100,0%) | 6,602 (100,0%) | 4,089 (100,0%) |
| Serbs | 7,130 (96,7%) | 5,945 (70,59%) | 4,077 (61,75%) | 2,156 (52,73%) |
| Bosniaks | 115 (1,6%) | 1,450 (17,22%) | 1,414 (21,42%) | 1,419 (34,70%) |
| Yugoslavs | 52 (0,7%) | 470 (5,581%) | 618 (9,361%) | 62 (1,516%) |
| Croats | 74 (1,0%) | 454 (5,391%) | 427 (6,468%) | 406 (9,929%) |
| Others | | 103 (1,223%) | 19 (0,288%) | 18 (0,440%) |
| Montenegrins | | | 30 (0,454%) | 21 (0,514%) |
| Albanians | | | 11 (0,167%) | 6 (0,147%) |
| Macedonians | | | 6 (0,091%) | 1 (0,024%) |

Ethnic composition – Mrkonjić Grad municipality
| | 2013. | 1991. | 1981. | 1971. |
| Total | 16,671 (100,0%) | 27,395 (100,0%) | 29,684 (100,0%) | 30,159 (100,0%) |
| Serbs | 16,050 (96,27%) | 21,057 (76,86%) | 23,364 (78,71%) | 24,990 (82,86%) |
| Bosniaks | 375 (2,249%) | 3,272 (11,94%) | 3,009 (10,14%) | 2,734 (9,065%) |
| Croats | 159 (0,954%) | 2,139 (7,808%) | 2,290 (7,715%) | 2,204 (7,308%) |
| Others | 87 (0,522%) | 334 (1,219%) | 67 (0,226%) | 82 (0,272%) |
| Yugoslavs | | 593 (2,165%) | 883 (2,975%) | 98 (0,325%) |
| Montenegrins | | | 47 (0,158%) | 38 (0,126%) |
| Albanians | | | 15 (0,051%) | 11 (0,036%) |
| Macedonians | | | 8 (0,027%) | 1 (0,003%) |
| Slovenes | | | 1 (0,003%) | 1 (0,003%) |

== Economy ==
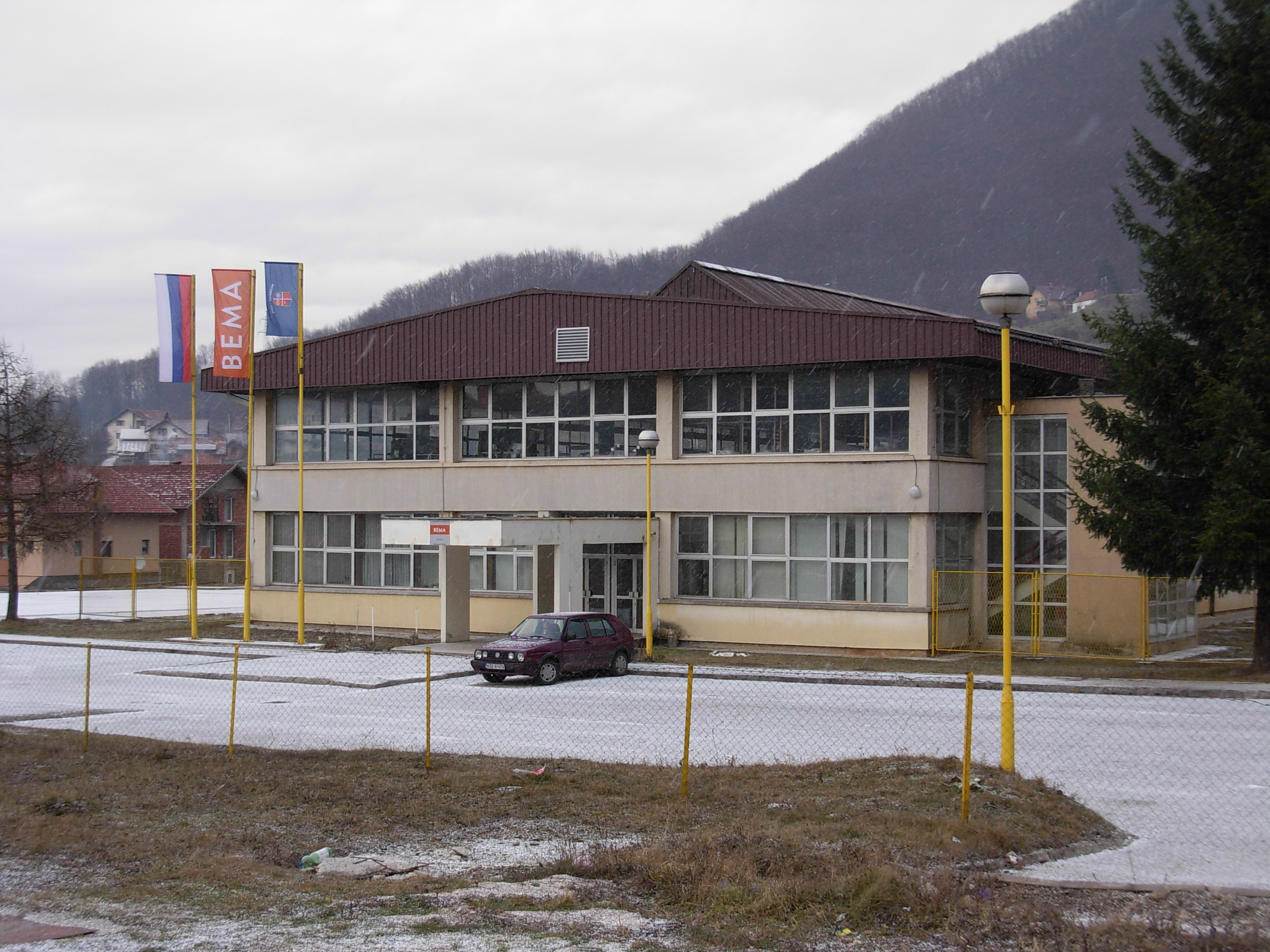
Shoe factory

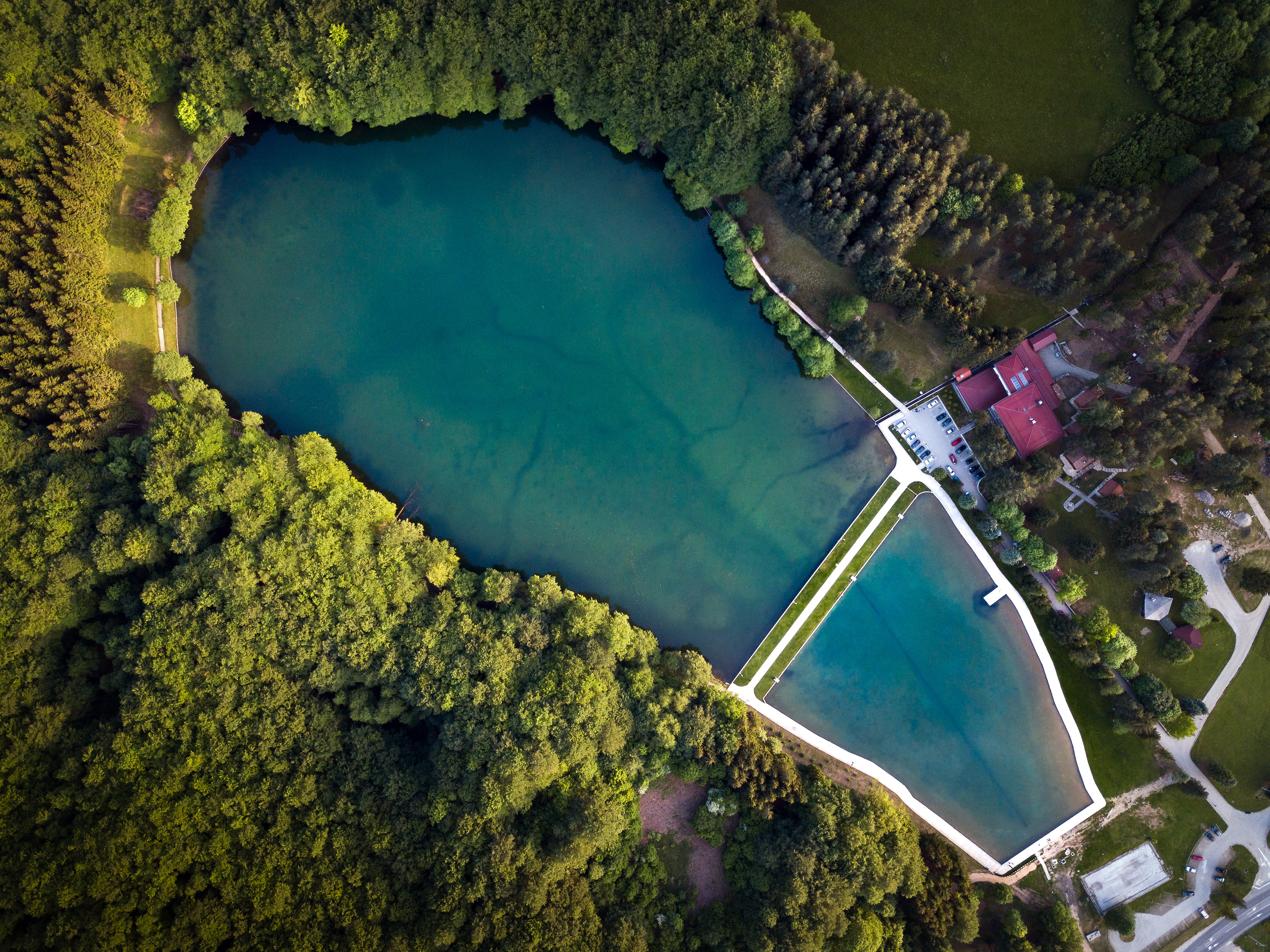
Balkana lake

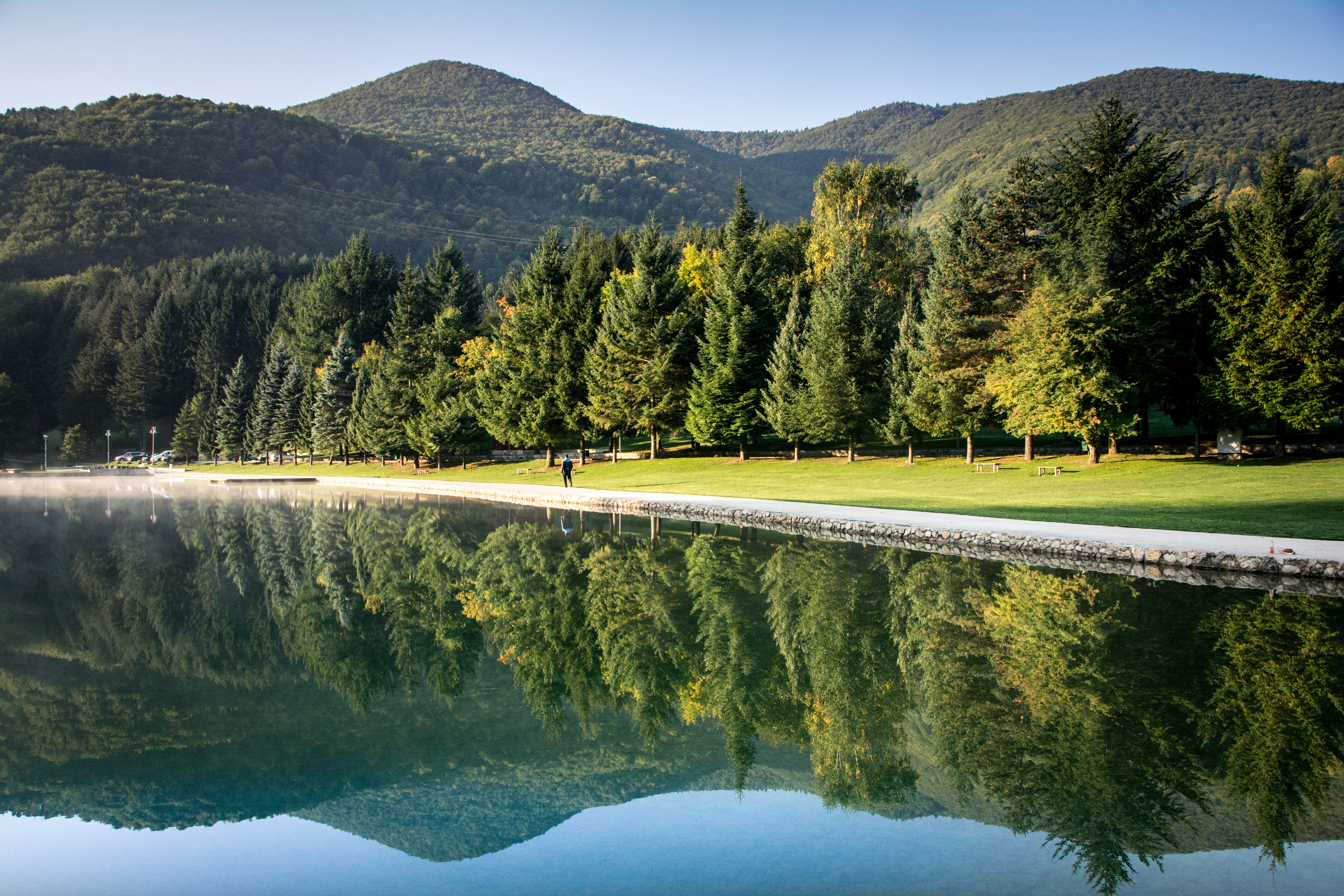
Balkana lake

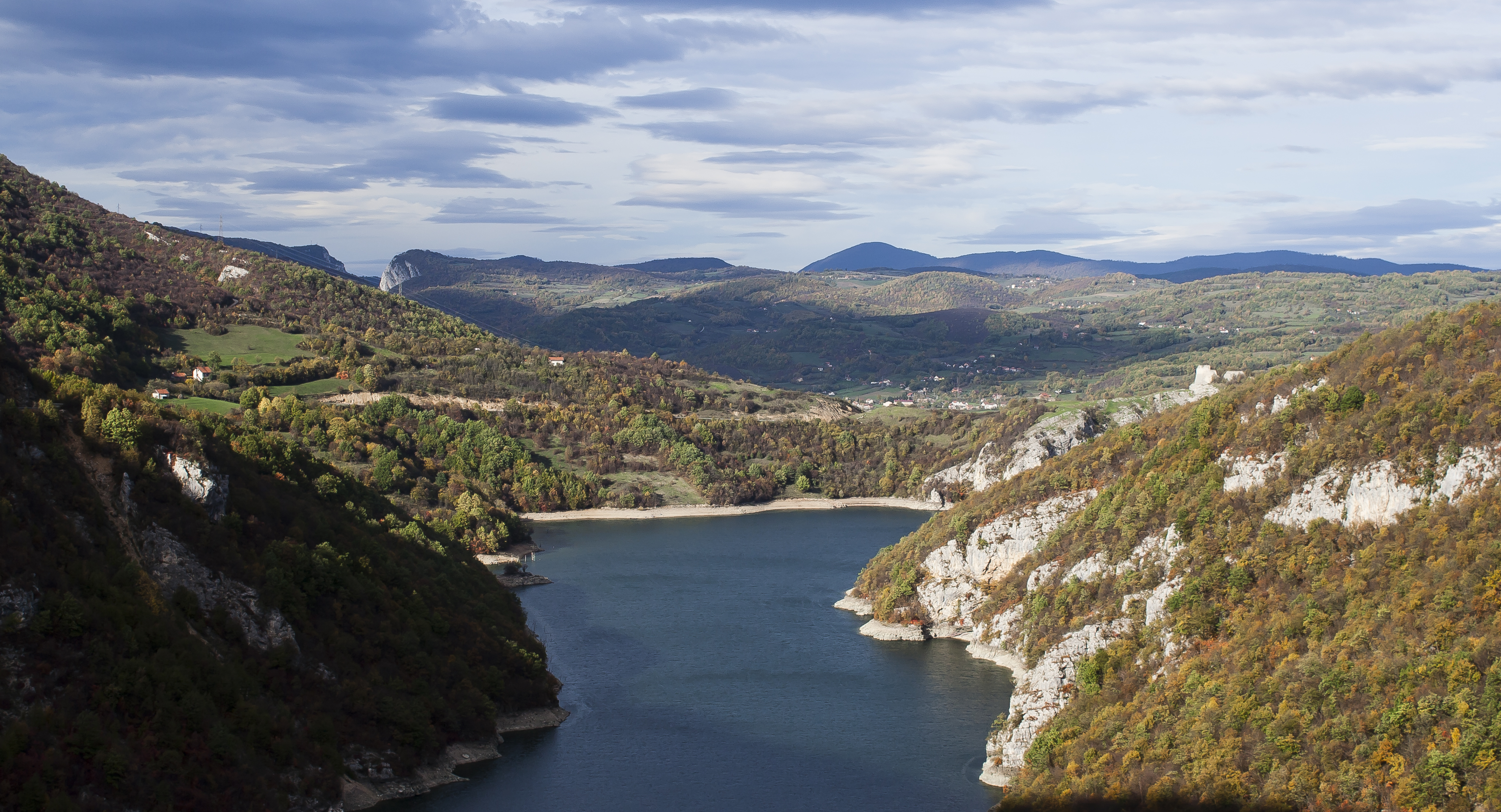
Bočac lake

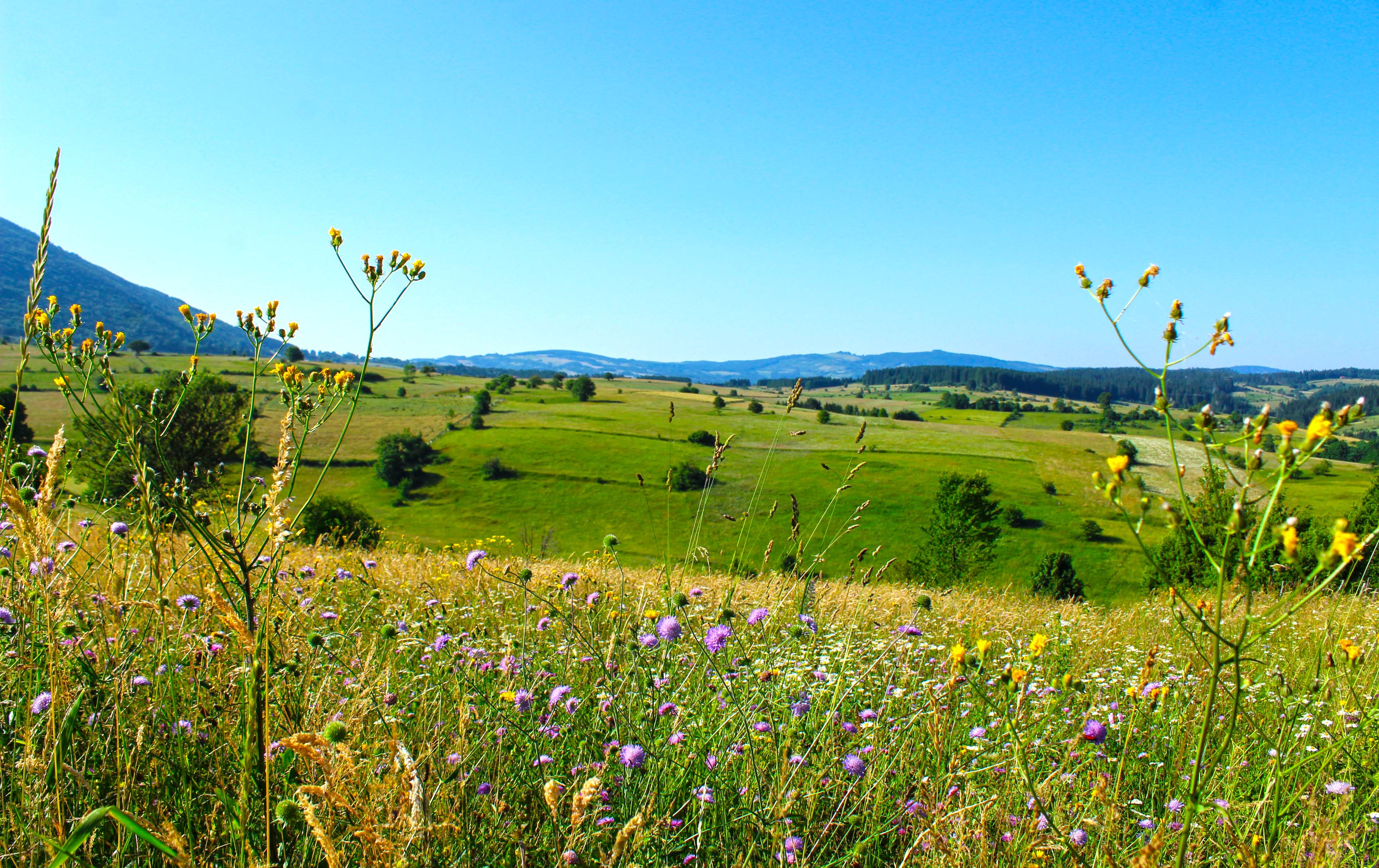
Landscape from the area

The following table gives a preview of total number of registered employed people per their core activity (as of 2016):

| Professional field | Total |
|---|---|
| Agriculture, forestry and fishing | 196 |
| Mining and quarrying | 22 |
| Manufacturing | 814 |
| Distribution of power, gas, steam and air-conditioning | 235 |
| Distribution of water and water waste management | 52 |
| Construction | 499 |
| Wholesale and retail, repair | 490 |
| Transportation and storage | 171 |
| Hotels and restaurants | 145 |
| Information and communication | 25 |
| Finance and insurance | 35 |
| Real estate activities | 1 |
| Professional, scientific and technical activities | 74 |
| Administrative and support services | 3 |
| Public administration and defence | 243 |
| Education | 328 |
| Healthcare and social work | 122 |
| Art, entertainment and recreation | 15 |
| Other service activities | 47 |
| Total | 3,517 |

== Tourism ==
The Balkana Lake lies near the town and is a small, but beautiful tourist resort including the nearby Skakavac Waterfall.

== Bibliography ==
- Trgo, Fabijan, ed. (1964). Zbornik dokumenata i podataka o Narodno-oslobodilačkom ratu Jugoslovenskih naroda. Vol. V, 32.
