= Krupa =

Krupa or Krupá may refer to:

== People ==
- Krupa (surname)

== Places ==
=== Bosnia and Herzegovina ===
- Bosanska Krupa, a town and municipality in the Federation of Bosnia and Herzegovina
- Krupa, Gornji Vakuf-Uskoplje, a village in the Federation of Bosnia and Herzegovina
- Krupa na Uni, a municipality in Republika Srpska
- Krupa na Vrbasu, a village near Banja Luka in Republika Srpska
- Krupa (Neretva), a river

=== Croatia ===
- Krupa, Croatia, a village near Obrovac
- Krupa monastery, a Serbian Orthodox monastery
- Krupa (Zrmanja), a river near Obrovac

=== Czech Republic ===
- Krupá (Kolín District), a municipality and village in the Central Bohemian Region
- Krupá (Rakovník District), a municipality and village in the Central Bohemian Region
- Krupá, a village and part of Křesetice in the Central Bohemian Region
- Krupá (Morava), a creek in the Olomouc Region

=== Slovenia ===
- Krupa (Lahinja), a river
- Krupa, Semič, a village in the Municipality of Semič

== Other uses ==
- Krupa (song), a song by the band Apollo 440

== See also ==
- Kripa
