= Free Radio Prijedor =

Bosnian radio station

Prijedor; Bosnia and Herzegovina
- Broadcast area: Bosanska Krajina
- Frequency: Prijedor 98.3 MHz
- RDS: FREE

Programming
- Language: Serbian language
- Format: Local news, talk and music

Ownership
- Owner: FreeMedia d.o.o. Prijedor
- Sister stations: DiV Radio

History
- Founded: February 11, 1997

Technical information
- Licensing authority: CRA BiH
- Transmitter coordinates: 44°58′51″N 16°42′48″E
- Repeater: Kozara/Lisina

Links
- Webcast: Listen Live
- Website: www.freeradioprijedor.com

Free Radio Prijedor is a Bosnian local commercial radio station, broadcasting from Prijedor, Bosnia and Herzegovina. This radio station broadcasts a variety of programs such as music and local news.

Free Radio Prijedor was founded on 11 February 1997 as first private/commercial radio station in Prijedor area.

Radio station is formatted as an urban radio station that broadcasts entertainment-music and news program dedicated to the target group of listeners aged 20 to 45.

Program is mainly produced in Serbian language and it is available in the city of Prijedor and in municipalities in Bosanska Krajina area.

The owner of the local radio station is the company FreeMedia d.o.o. Prijedor which also operates DiV Radio radio station.

Estimated number of listeners of Free Radio Prijedor is around 404.233.

== Frequencies ==
- Prijedor 98.3 MHz

== See also ==
- List of radio stations in Bosnia and Herzegovina
- Radio Prijedor
- DiV Radio
- Radio Sana
- Radio USK
