= DiV Radio =

Bosnian radio station

Prijedor; Bosnia and Herzegovina
- Broadcast area: Bosanska Krajina
- Frequency: Prijedor 98.9 MHz
- RDS: DiV
- Branding: Commercial

Programming
- Language: Serbian language
- Format: Local news, talk and music

Ownership
- Owner: FreeMedia d.o.o. Prijedor
- Sister stations: Free Radio Prijedor

History
- Founded: May 16, 2018

Technical information
- Licensing authority: CRA BiH
- Transmitter coordinates: 44°58′51″N 16°42′48″E
- Repeater: Prijedor/Hambarine

Links
- Webcast: Listen Live
- Website: divradioprijedor.com

DiV Radio is a Bosnian radio station broadcasting from the city of Prijedor in Bosnia and Herzegovina. The station was founded on May 16, 2018, and predominantly broadcasts folk music and local news. The radio station owner, FreeMedia d.o.o. Prijedor, also operates the radio station Free Radio Prijedor, which was founded in 1997 and was the Prijedor area's first private/commercial radio station.

DiV Radio broadcasts in the local language, Serbian. Although it is based in Prijedor, it is also available in nearby municipalities in the Bosanska Krajina region, such as Kozarska Dubica, Bosanska Kostajnica, Novi Grad, and Oštra Luka. As of March 2021, DiV radio had approximately 80,000 listeners.

== Frequencies ==
- Prijedor 98.9 MHz

== See also ==
- List of radio stations in Bosnia and Herzegovina
- Radio Prijedor
- Free Radio Prijedor
- Radio USK
