= Staré Město (Šumperk District) =

- Town
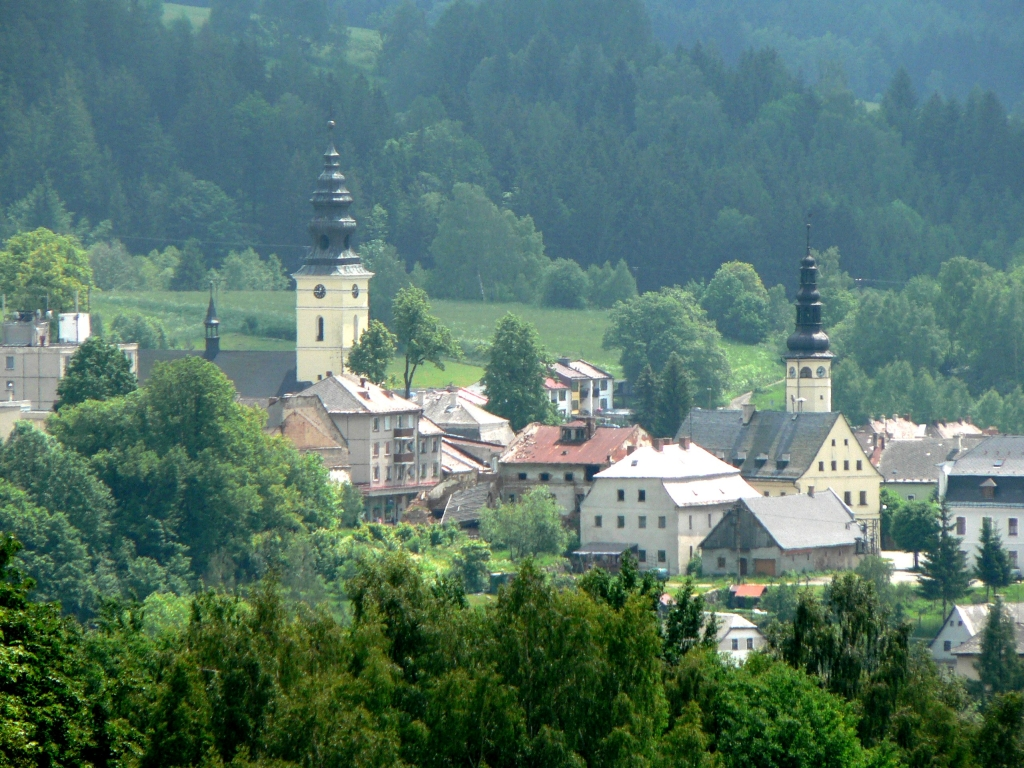
- Church of Saint Anne and the town hall

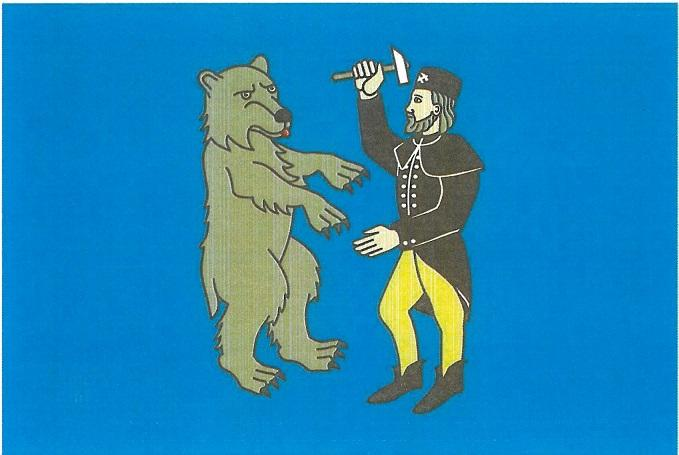
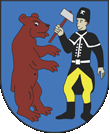
- Flag Coat of arms

- Location in the Czech Republic
- Coordinates: 50°9′42″N 16°57′18″E
- Country: Czech Republic
- Region: Olomouc
- District: Šumperk
- First mentioned: 1325

Government
  - Mayor: Lukáš Koreš

Area
  - Total: 86.27 km^{2} (33.31 sq mi)
- Elevation: 538 m (1,765 ft)

Population (2026-01-01)
  - Total: 1,667
  - Density: 19.32/km^{2} (50.05/sq mi)
- Time zone: UTC+1 (CET)
  - Summer (DST): UTC+2 (CEST)
- Postal code: 788 32
- Website: www.mu-staremesto.cz

Staré Město (Czech pronunciation: [ˈstarɛː ˈmɲɛsto]; German: Mährisch Altstadt) is a town in Šumperk District in the Olomouc Region of the Czech Republic. It has about 1,700 inhabitants.

== Administrative division ==
Staré Město consists of five municipal parts (in brackets population according to the 2021 census):

- Staré Město (1,372)
- Chrastice (60)
- Kunčice (51)
- Nová Seninka (43)
- Stříbrnice (37)

== Etymology ==
After the founding of the village, the name Goldeck/Goldek (i.e. 'gold corner') was the first to be used. It referred to the gold mining in the area. The name Altstadt/Staré Město (i.e. 'old town') began to be used only in the 15th century.

The town is sometimes called Staré Město pod Sněžníkem to distinguish it from other places called Staré Město.

== Geography ==
Staré Město is located about 22 km (14 mi) north of Šumperk and 66 km (41 mi) north of Olomouc, on the border with Poland. The Polish border is accessible via 815 m (2,674 ft) high Kłodzko Pass, where the road leads downhill into the Kłodzko Valley. The built-up area lies at the upper end of the wide Krupá valley.

The western part of the municipal territory lies in the Králický Sněžník Mountains and the southern part lies in the Golden Mountains. Rest of the territory, including the town proper, lies in the Hanušovice Highlands. The highest point is the mountain Sušina at 1,321 m (4,334 ft) above sea level. The Králický Sněžník peak lies about 9 km (6 mi) northwest of the town, outside the municipal territory.

== History ==
=== 14th–16th centuries ===
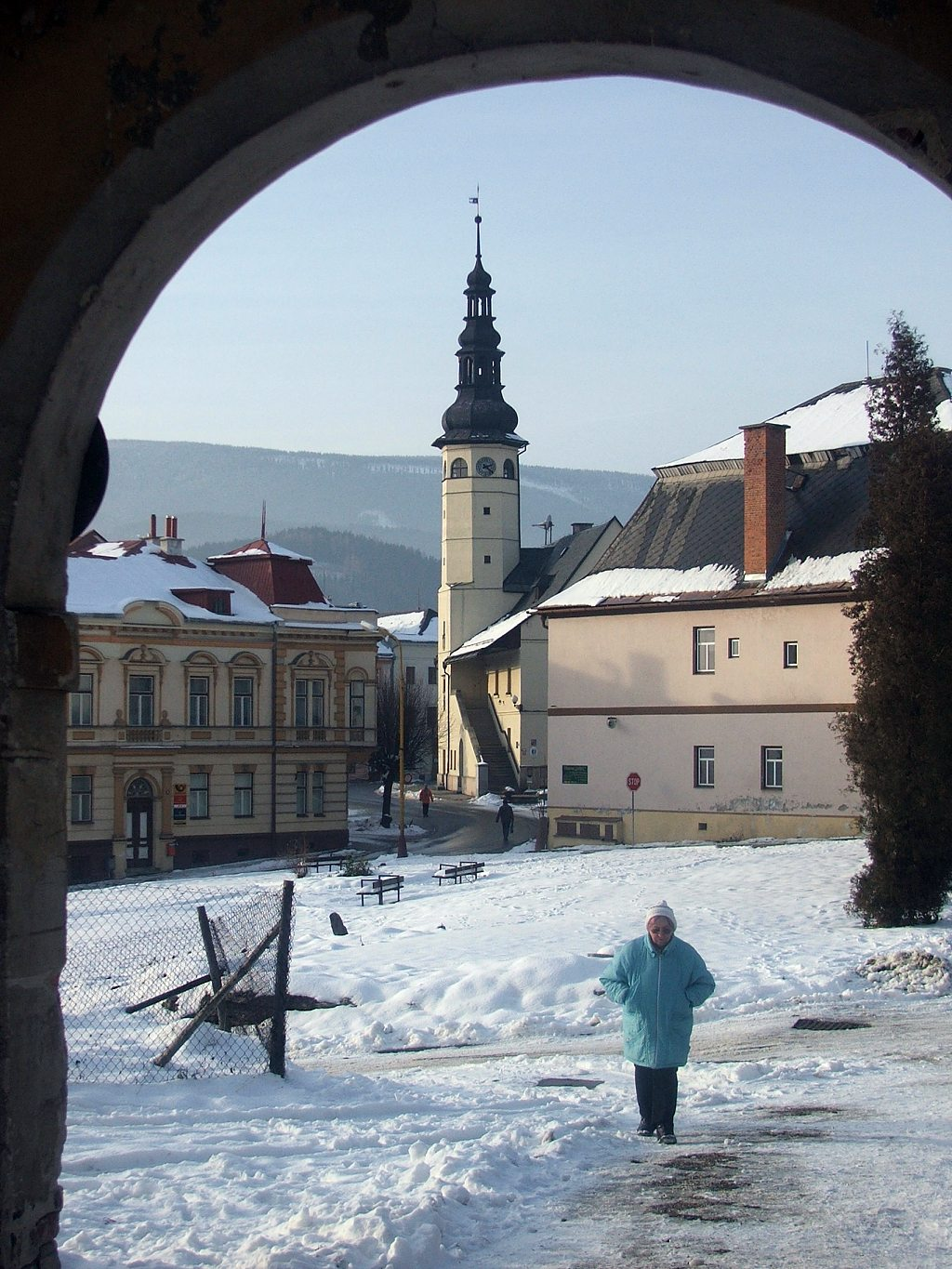
Main square with the town hall

Staré Město was founded during the mining colonisation of this area in the late 13th and early 14th century. The first written mention of Staré Město is from 1325, when it was already referred to as a market town. In 1336, it was promoted to a free mining town by Moravian Margrave Charles IV. The town was known for mining, especially gold, silver, copper and iron ore. During the Hussite Wars, all the mining works were destroyed and mining stopped.

Staré Město was acquired by the Lords of Zvole in 1448. Václav of Zvole restored the glory of the former mining town in the mid-16th century and made it a trading and craft centre; linen became the most important. In 1560, the settlement restored its town privileges.

=== 17th–19th centuries ===
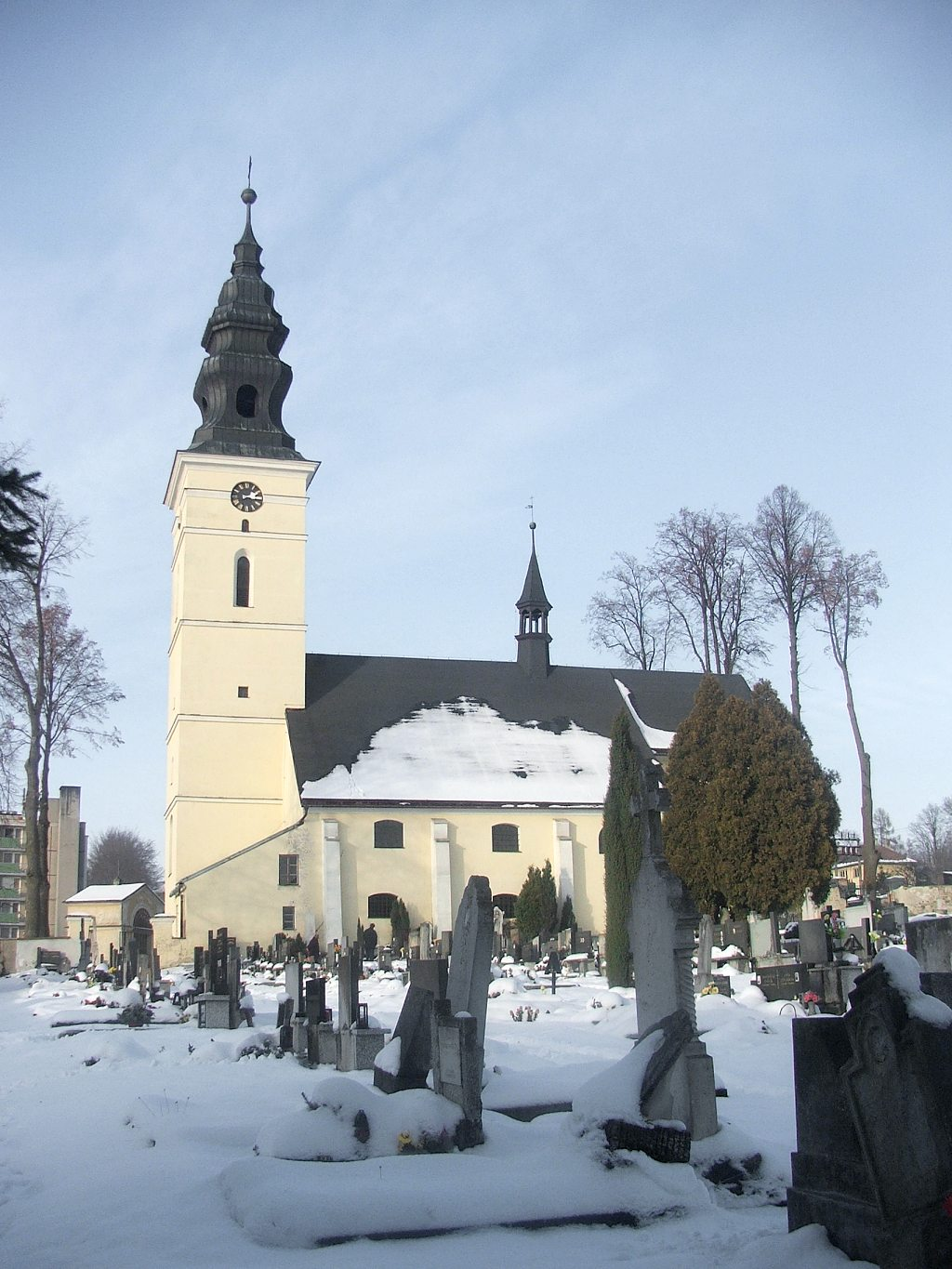
Church of Saint Anne

The town further prospered during the rule of the lords of Bruntálský of Vrbno (in 1582–1615) and during the short rule of the Petřvaldský of Petřvald family (1615–1622). Eliška Petřvaldská had the wooden houses on the square replaced with brick ones, and had the new town hall and church built. Properties of the family were confiscated from them after the Battle of White Mountain and sold to Karl I, Prince of Liechtenstein in 1624. The Liechtensteins owned Staré Město until 1848.

In 1645, during the Thirty Years' War, the Swedish soldiers looted Staré Město and burned down half of it. However, the town recovered quickly. During the 17th and 18th centuries, it became a local centre of agriculture and crafts. The predominant craft was linen; metallurgy, glassmaking and butchery production also developed. Even the Silesian Wars in the 18th century did not stop the economic growth of the town.

In the 19th century Staré město became a regional industrial centre. The Buhl family of entrepreneurs founded a small factory processing flax and even cotton in 1828. Also enormous deposits of graphite were discovered, and Buhls were one of the first mining investors. A branch railway line along the Krupá and Morava rivers down to Hanušovice opened in 1905.

=== 20th century ===
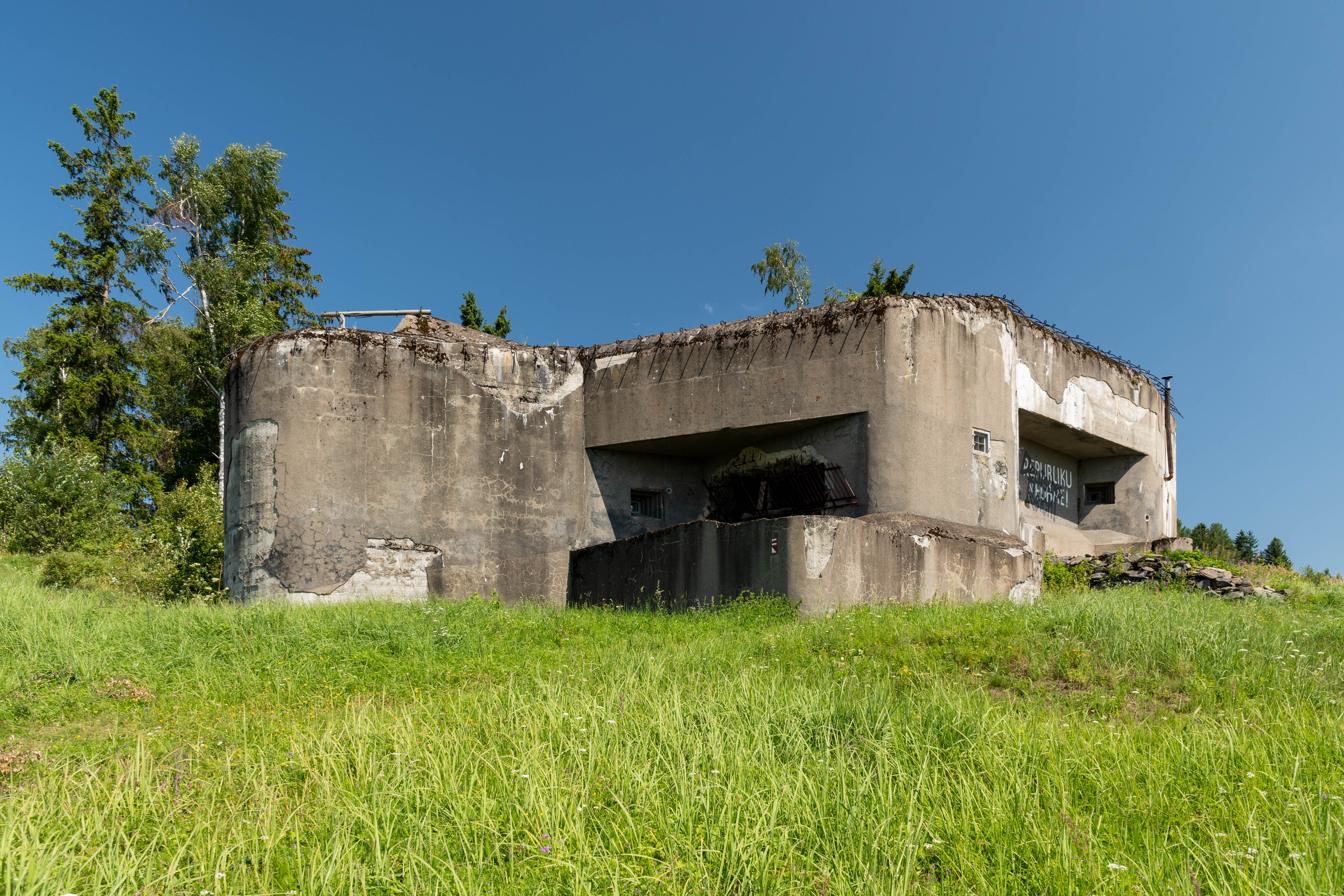
Remannts of the fortifications

After the establishment of the First Czechoslovak Republic in 1918, a Czech minority was established in what was ethnically mostly a German town until then. The town was strongly militarized in the interwar period due to its strategic position near the German border at Kłodzko Pass and due to the rise of the nacionalist Sudeten German Party under Konrad Henlein, who attacked the Czech minority. Extensive construction of the border fortifications began here in 1937, and in 1938 the town was given a permanent Czechoslovak military garrison. The 1938 Munich Agreement resulted in German occupation. During World War II, the town was incorporated into Nazi Germany and administered as part of the Reichsgau Sudetenland. The occupiers made the town a recreational area for Wehrmacht forces.

The German-speaking population was expelled in 1946. The municipality, which lost its status of a town in 1946, was resettled by families especially from inner Czechoslovakia, but also from Hungary and Bulgaria. The region of Staré Město lost its strategic military position as the former German territories in the northwest fell to Poland, therefore nearby woods could be exploited. Handicraft production disappeared, but tourism began to develop.

In 1976, the villages of Chrastice, Kunčice, Nová Seninka and Stříbrnice were joined to Staré Město. Staré Město restored the town status in 2000.

== Demographics ==
Historical population

Year	Pop.	±%
1869	4,903	—
1880	5,183	+5.7%
1890	5,126	−1.1%
1900	4,775	−6.8%
1910	4,680	−2.0%

Year	Pop.	±%
1921	4,476	−4.4%
1930	4,719	+5.4%
1950	2,636	−44.1%
1961	2,314	−12.2%
1970	2,099	−9.3%

Year	Pop.	±%
1980	2,169	+3.3%
1991	2,129	−1.8%
2001	2,145	+0.8%
2011	1,735	−19.1%
2021	1,563	−9.9%

Source: Censuses

== Economy ==
The most important economic sector is tourism, another important sectors are agriculture (including organic farming) and forestry.

Rests of the graphite deposits are not recently mined. A successor of the former state-owned mining company bankrupted in 2011.

== Transport ==
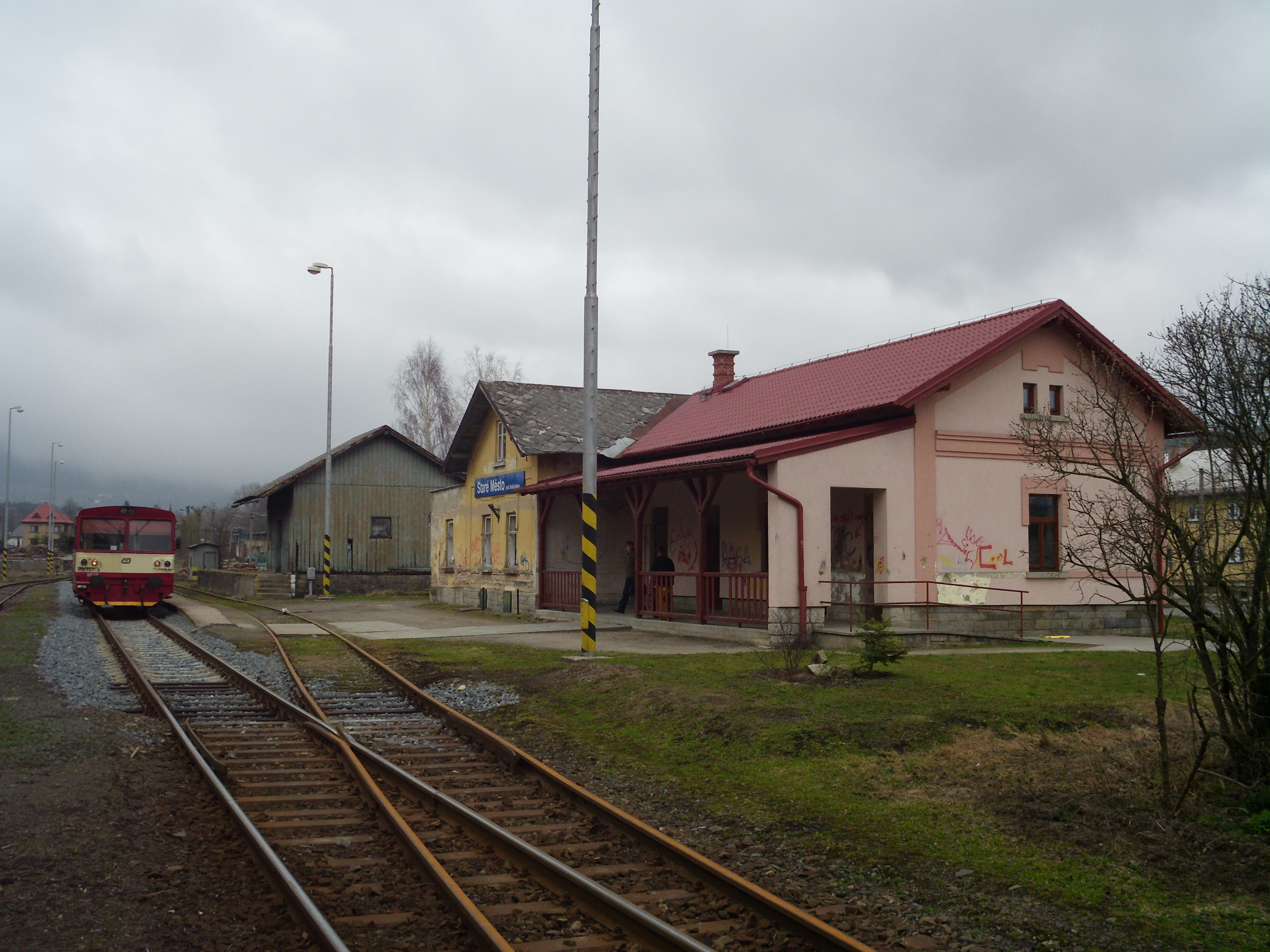
Train station

The Czech–Polish road border crossing Staré Město / Nowa Morawa is located in the Kłodzko Pass.

Staré Město is the start of a short railway line of local importance to Hanušovice.

== Sport ==
The town is equipped with a multi-purpose sports complex.

The surrounding mountains are used for skiing. There are several ski resorts in the area, both with cross-country trails and with ski slopes with lifts.

== Sights ==
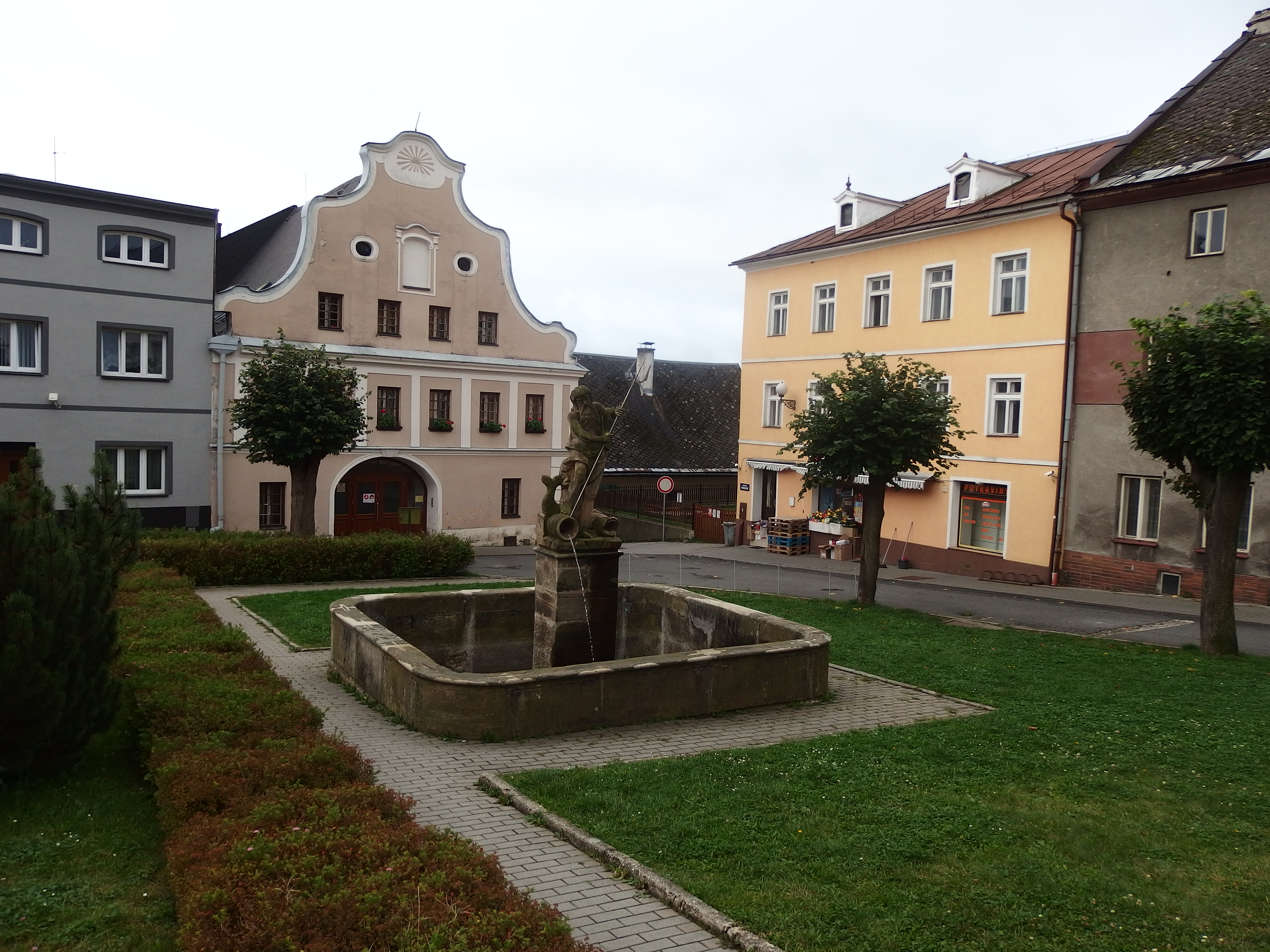
Southwestern part of the town square with the Neptune fountain

The most important historical monuments are the Church of Saint Anne and the town hall. Other sights include preserved burger houses or a fountain with a statue of Neptune on the town square from the turn of the 18th and 19th centuries.

The town hall was built in the late Renaissance style in 1619 and reconstructed after fires in 1725 and 1825. It has a 35 metres (115 ft) high tower, originally with a guard function. Today the tower serves as an observation tower.

The Church of Saint Anne dates from 1618. The 48.5 metres (159 ft) high tower was added in 1657–1662. The entrance gate and both side chapels were added in the 19th century.

A technical monument are remnants of the military fortifications from the period 1935–1938. An educational trail leads through this so-called "Staré Město Fortress Area". A museum is situated in the former military base, which also preserves the abandoned interwar forts.

== Twin towns – sister cities ==
Staré Město is twinned with:

- Stronie Śląskie, Poland
