= TV Prijedor =

- Country: Bosnia and Herzegovina
- Broadcast area: Prijedor
- Headquarters: Prijedor

Programming
- Language(s): Serbian
- Picture format: 4:3 576i SDTV

Ownership
- Owner: _{Informativno poslovni centar "Kozarski vjesnik" AD Prijedor}
- Sister channels: Radio Prijedor

History
- Launched: 1969 (radio); 2000 (television)
- Former names: RTV Prijedor/PТВ Приједор

Availability

Terrestrial
- Prijedor _{(18:00-24:00h)}: UFH

TV Prijedor or Televizija Prijedor is a local Bosnian public television channel based in Prijedor municipality. It was established in 2000 as ТВ Приједор. Program is mainly produced in Serbian from 6 pm to midnight.

Radio Prijedor and local newspapers Kozarski Vjesnik are also part of public municipality services.
