= Krupa (surname) =

Krupa is a surname of Slavic origin, meaning "barley", usually found in Polish, Slovak, and eastern German regions. Notable people with the surname include:

- Adam Krupa (born 1952), Polish footballer
- Aleksander (Olek) Krupa (born 1947), Polish film and television actor
- Alfred Krupa Sr. (1915–1989), Silesia born painter, inventor and sportsman
- Dawid Krupa (born 1980), Polish cyclist
- Emil Krupa-Krupinsky (1872–1924), German portrait painter, genre painter and graphic artist
- Gene Krupa (1909–1973), Polish-American jazz drummer, bandleader and composer
- Jacek Krupa (born 1955), Polish politician
- Jakub Krupa (born 1985), Czech handball player
- Jeroen Krupa (born 2003), German footballer
- Joanna Krupa (born 1979), Polish-American model and actress
- Joe Krupa (1933–2011), American football player
- Joan Krupa, American educator, administrator, and member of the Illinois House of Representatives
- Killi Krupa Rani (born 1965), member of the Indian Parliament
- Krystyna Krupa (born 1939), Polish Olympic volleyball player
- Monika Krupa (born 1977), Poland chess Woman Grandmaster
- Paweł Krupa (born 1989), Polish handball player
- S. E. Krupa Rao (1939–1993), Indian pastor of the Convention of Baptist Churches of Northern Circars
- Stefania Krupa (1909–1981), Polish Olympic gymnast
- Tomáš Krupa (born 1972), Czech tennis player and coach
- Urszula Krupa (born 1949), Polish politician
- Władysław Krupa (1899–1969), Polish footballer
