= Krupa, Gornji Vakuf-Uskoplje =

Krupa
- Village
- Location within Bosnia and Herzegovina
- Coordinates: 43.9507611°N 17.5859301°E
- Country: Bosnia and Herzegovina
- Entity: Federation of Bosnia and Herzegovina
- Canton: Central Bosnia
- Municipality: Gornji Vakuf-Uskoplje

Area
  - Total: 2.45 sq mi (6.34 km^{2})

Population (2013)
  - Total: 880
  - Density: 360/sq mi (140/km^{2})
- Time zone: UTC+1 (CET)
  - Summer (DST): UTC+2 (CEST)

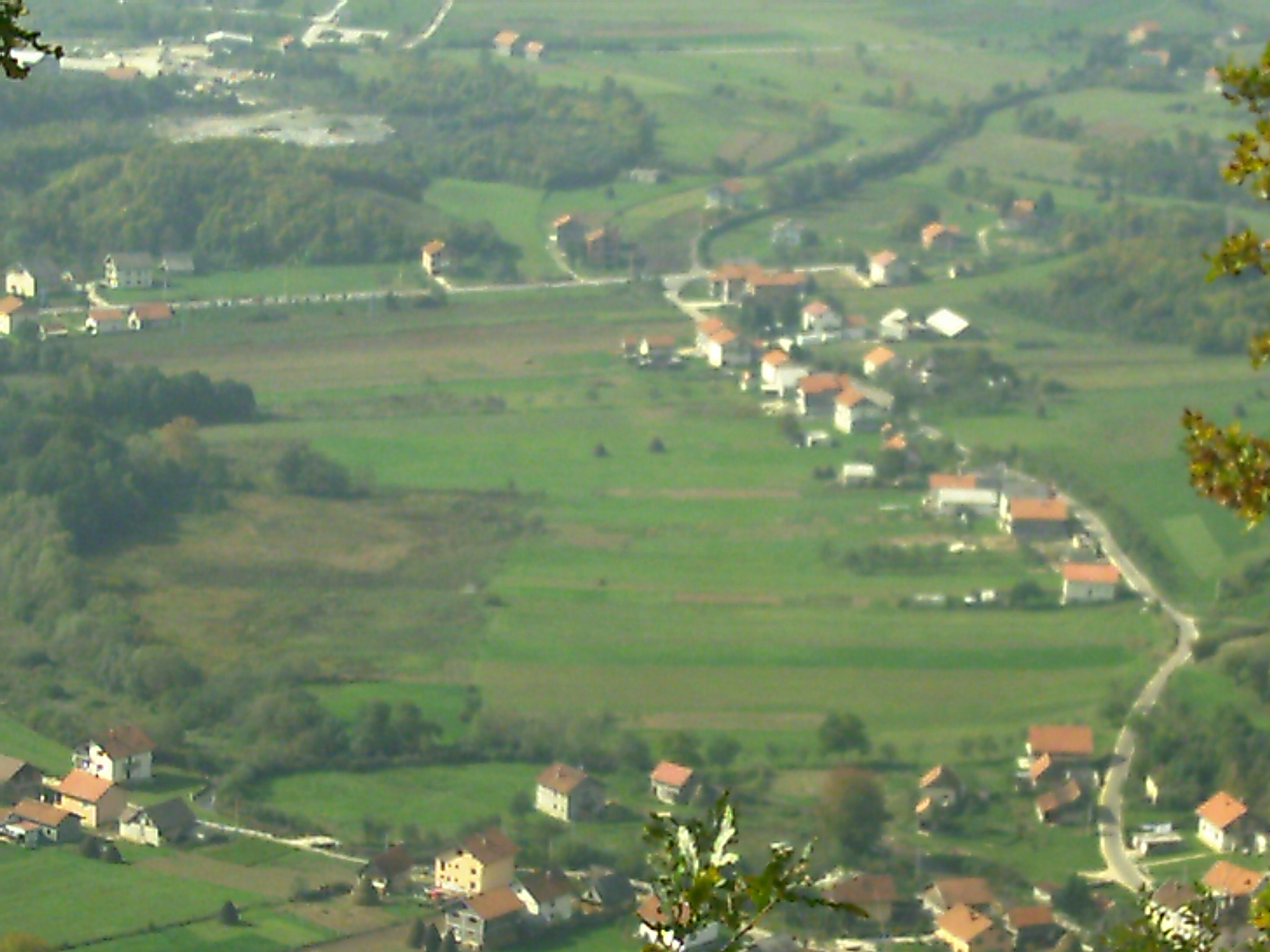

Krupa is a village in the municipality of Gornji Vakuf, Bosnia and Herzegovina.

== Demographics ==
According to the 2013 census, its population was 880.

Ethnicity in 2013
Ethnicity	Number	Percentage
Bosniaks	602	68.4%
Croats	268	30.5%
other/undeclared	10	1.1%
Total	880	100%
