= Krupá (Morava) =

Coordinates: 50°05′N 16°56′E

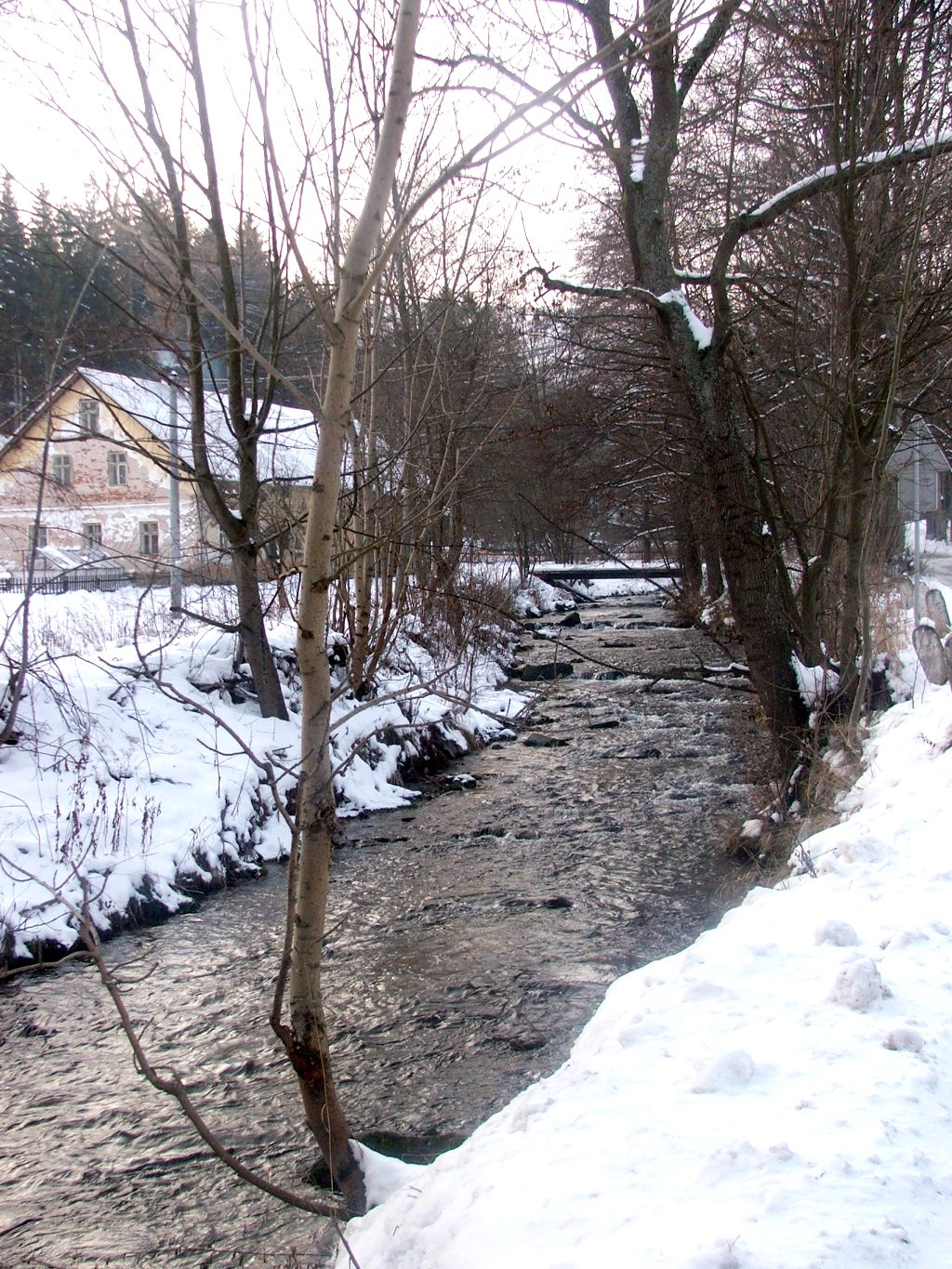
- The Krupá in the town of Staré Město

Location
- Country: Czech Republic
- Region: Olomouc
- District: Šumperk

Physical characteristics
- Source
  - location: Snieznik Mountains
  - elevation: 400 m (1,300 ft)
- Mouth: Morava
  - location: Hanušovice
- Length: 19.2 km (11.9 mi)
- Discharge
  - location: mouth

Basin features
- Tributaries
  - left: Kunčický Creek, Telečský Creek
  - right: Štěpánovský Creek, Chrastický Creek
- Progression: Morava→ Danube→ Black Sea

Krupá (German: Graupa) is a creek in Šumperk District in the Olomouc Region of the Czech Republic. It is a left tributary of the Morava. Its length is 19,2 km and its drainage basin covers 112.7 km2. The mean annual discharge at its mouth is 4.48 m³/s.

== Geography ==
The Krupá originates in Czech part of the Snieznik Mountains, 400 meters above sea level.

The Krupá then goes south toward the town of Staré Město. It flows into the Morava River near Hanušovice. The river keeps its natural character with meanders and original riversides. The river bottom is covered by stones.

== Economy ==
A Small hydro power plant is situated on the creek. Amphibolite and gneiss quarry is in a neighborhood of the creek mouth.
