= Radio Prijedor =

Bosnian radio station

Radio Prijedor Радио Приједор
Prijedor; Bosnia and Herzegovina
- Broadcast area: Bosanska Krajina
- Frequency: Prijedor 97.9 MHz
- Branding: Public

Programming
- Language: Serbian language
- Format: Local news, talk and music

Ownership
- Owner: IPC Kozarski vjesnik a.d. Prijedor
- Sister stations: TV Prijedor

History
- First air date: June 12, 1969
- Call sign meaning: PRIJEDOR

Technical information
- Transmitter coordinates: 44°58′51″N 16°42′48″E
- Repeater: Kozara/Mrakovica

Links
- Webcast: On website
- Website: www.kozarski.com

Radio Prijedor or Радио Приједор is a Bosnian local public radio station, broadcasting from Prijedor, Bosnia and Herzegovina. Local TV Prijedor is also part of public municipality services.

== History ==
Radio Prijedor was launched on 12 June 1969 by the municipal council of Prijedor. In Yugoslavia and in SR Bosnia and Herzegovina, it was part of local/municipal Radio Sarajevo network affiliate. This radio station broadcasts a variety of programs such as local news, music, sport and talk shows. Nowadays, program is mainly produced in Serbian.

During the war in Bosnia and Herzegovina, this radio station was used for propaganda in Prijedor. On May 31, 1992, Bosnian Serb authorities in Prijedor issued an order via local radio ordering the non-Serb population to mark their houses with white flags or sheets, and to wear in public white ribbons around their sleeves if they leave their homes. "Citizens of Serbian nationality, join your army and police in the pursuit of these extremists. Other citizens, Muslims and Croats, must hang white flags on their houses and apartments and put white ribbons on their hands. Otherwise, it will suffer severe consequences ", read the call on the radio.

== Frequencies ==
Estimated number of listeners of Radio Prijedor is around 177,145. Radio station is also available in Una-Sana Canton and neighboring Croatia.

- Prijedor 97.9 MHz

== See also ==
- List of radio stations in Bosnia and Herzegovina
