= Krupá (Kolín District) =

- Municipality
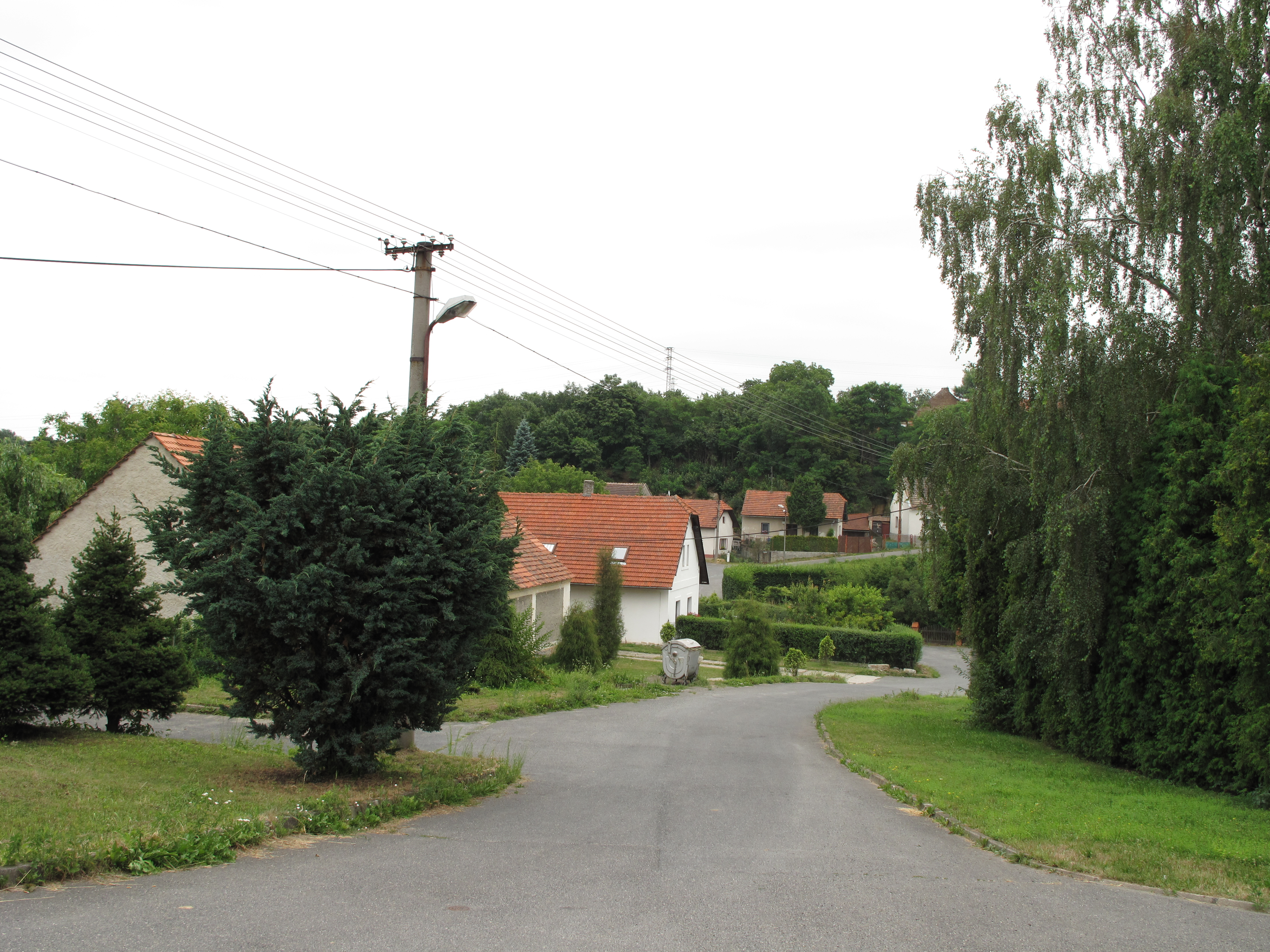
- Old part of Krupá

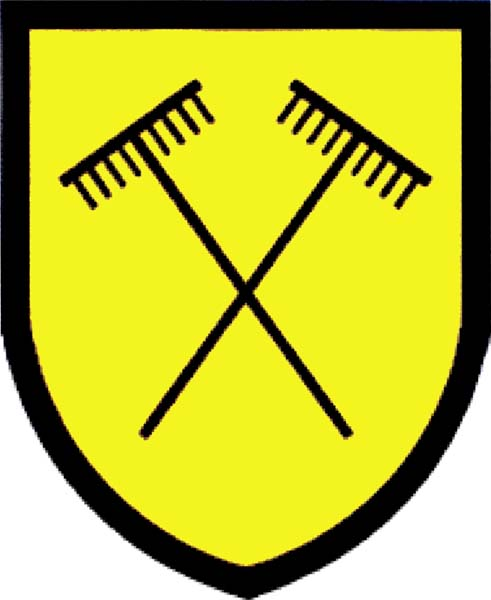
- Coat of arms

- Location in the Czech Republic
- Coordinates: 50°1′3″N 14°52′17″E
- Country: Czech Republic
- Region: Central Bohemian
- District: Kolín
- First mentioned: 1340

Area
  - Total: 5.63 km^{2} (2.17 sq mi)
- Elevation: 332 m (1,089 ft)

Population (2026-01-01)
  - Total: 406
  - Density: 72.1/km^{2} (187/sq mi)
- Time zone: UTC+1 (CET)
  - Summer (DST): UTC+2 (CEST)
- Postal code: 281 63
- Website: www.krupa-obec.cz

Krupá is a municipality and village in Kolín District in the Central Bohemian Region of the Czech Republic. It has about 400 inhabitants.

== Administrative division ==
Krupá consists of two municipal parts (in brackets population according to the 2021 census):

- Krupá (374)
- Syneč (34)

== Demographics ==
Historical population
| Year | Pop. | ±% |
|---|---|---|
| 1869 | 346 | — |
| 1880 | 480 | +38.7% |
| 1890 | 463 | −3.5% |
| 1900 | 543 | +17.3% |
| 1910 | 553 | +1.8% |
| 1921 | 490 | −11.4% |
| 1930 | 493 | +0.6% |
| 1950 | 372 | −24.5% |
| 1961 | 393 | +5.6% |
| 1970 | 360 | −8.4% |
| 1980 | 346 | −3.9% |
| 1991 | 346 | +0.0% |
| 2001 | 360 | +4.0% |
| 2011 | 369 | +2.5% |
| 2021 | 408 | +10.6% |
Source: Censuses
