= Bosanska Krajina =

Subregion of Bosnia

Coordinates: 44°46′N 17°11′E

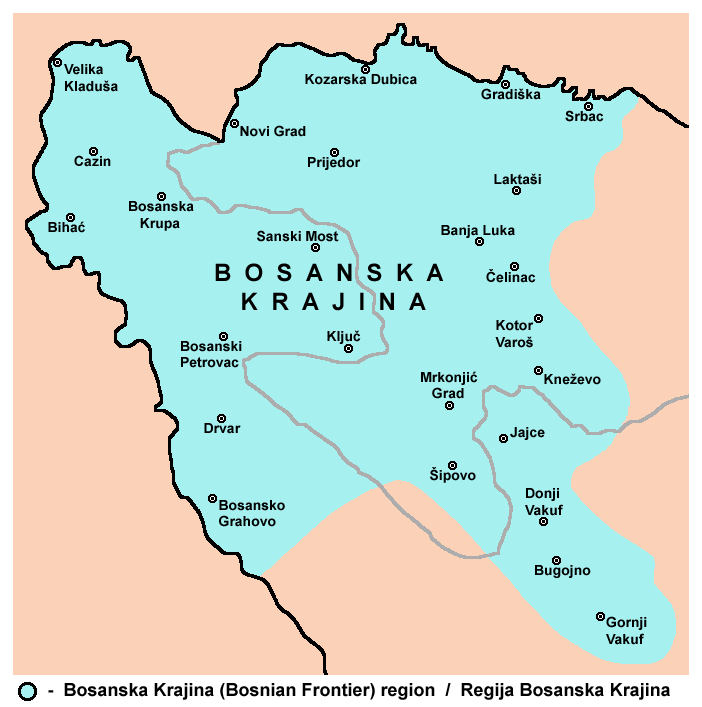
Map of the region with towns

The Bosanska Krajina (Serbian Cyrillic: Босанска Крајина, lit. 'Bosnian Frontier') is a geographical region, a subregion of Bosnia, in western Bosnia and Herzegovina. It is enclosed by several rivers, namely the Sava (north), Glina (northwest), Vrbanja and Vrbas (east and southeast, respectively). The region is also a historic, economic, and cultural entity of Bosnia and Herzegovina, noted for its preserved nature and wildlife diversity.

The largest city and historical center of the region is Banja Luka. Other cities and towns include Bihać, Bosanska Krupa, Bosanski Petrovac, Čelinac, Bosansko Grahovo, Bužim, Cazin, Drvar, Gradiška, Ključ, Kostajnica, Kozarska Dubica, Kneževo, Kotor Varoš, Laktaši, Mrkonjić Grad, Novi Grad, Prijedor, Sanski Most, Šipovo, Velika Kladuša, and Prnjavor.

Bosanska Krajina has no formal status; however, it has a significant cultural and historical identity that was formed through several historic and economic events. The territory of Bosanska Krajina is currently divided between the Federation of Bosnia and Herzegovina and Republika Srpska.

== Name ==
During the Medieval Bosnia period, the region of Bosanska Krajina was known as Donji Kraji (transl. Lower Ends) and Zapadne Strane (transl. Westward Sides). After the downfall of the Kingdom of Bosnia and subsequent Ottoman conquest of Bosnia and Herzegovina in 1463, which contributed to the Ottoman territorial expansion into the western Balkans in a series of wars, the region between the Una and Vrbas rivers became known as Krajina (transl. Frontier) or Bosanska Krajina (transl. Bosnian Frontier). The first recorded usage of the name Bosanska Krajina is in 1594.

Also, for the same territory, the exonym Turkish Croatia appeared in German speaking Austria-Hungary in the first decades of the 18th century, and was first used in maps created by the Austro-Hungarian — Ottoman Border Commission, which was mandated by the peace treaty of Karlowitz (1699), and then the peace treaty of Passarowitz (1718), and consisted exclusively of Austrians' and Venetians' military cartographers, and one Croat (Vitezović). In the mid-19th century the term Turkish Croatia, used in some Austrian maps for the Western Balkans, was replaced in favor of region's common name, Bosanska Krajina.

== Geography ==
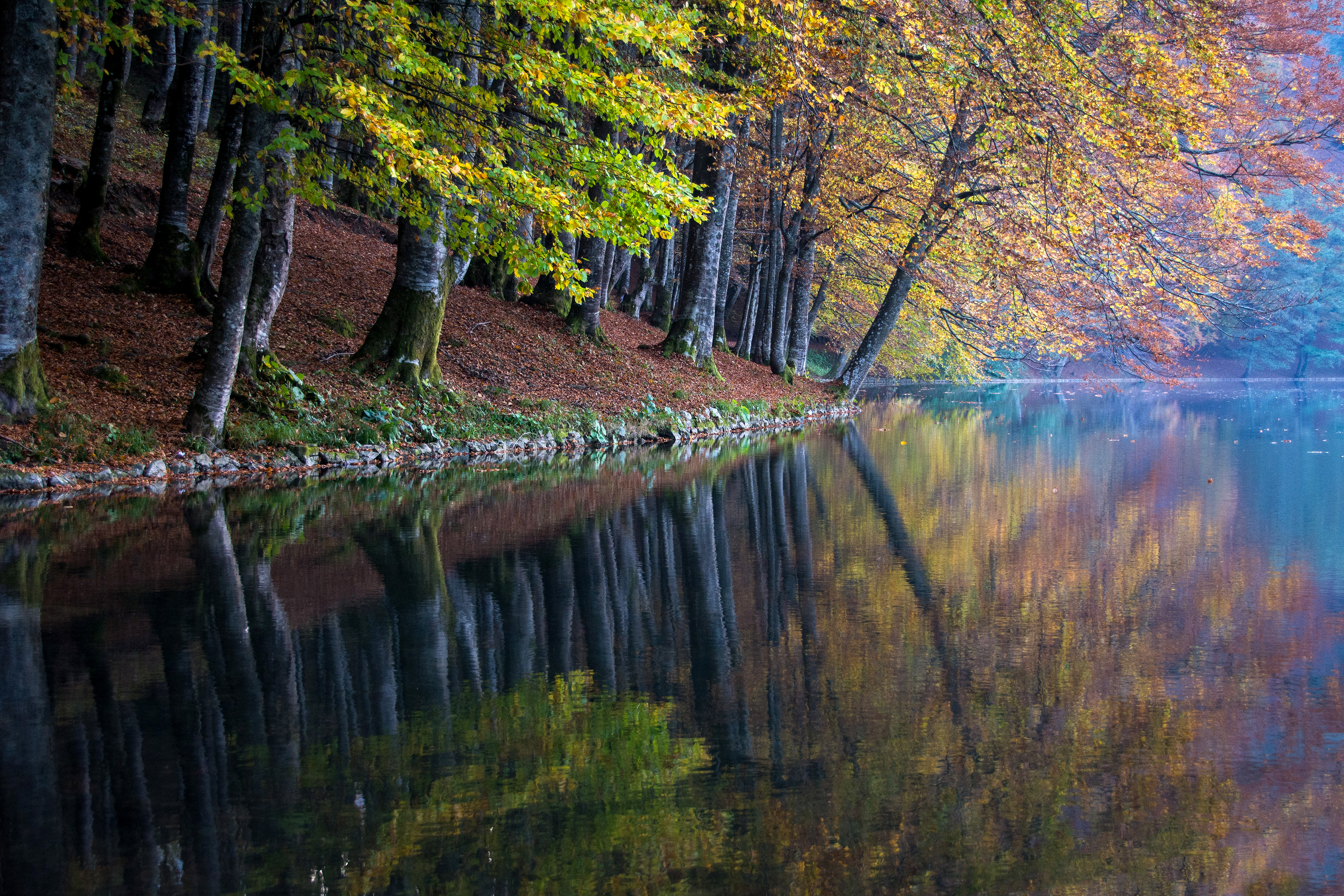
Balkana Lake

Bosanska Krajina in the narrower sense extends around the middle course of the Una: Bihać, Cazin and Krupa, and is known as Bihaćka Krajina.

== History ==
=== Middle Ages ===
In the 6th century, today's northwestern Bosnia was part of the Roman province of Dalmatia. It fell under the jurisdiction of the Eastern Roman Empire. Shortly thereafter, Eurasian Avars and their Slavic subjects from central-eastern Europe invaded Dalmatia and settled in what is now Bosnia and Herzegovina. In the 7th century, the Serbs and Croats formed principalities initially under the Eastern Roman Empire. The region was part of the Duchy of Croatia in the Early Middle Ages. which later became part of the Kingdom of Croatia under Tomislav I.

Archaeological data show that medieval cemeteries of northwestern Bosnia clearly indicate that from the first half of the 10th century this territory was under the political rule of Tomislav I. Northern parts of these territories were ruled by the Slavonian Banate (parishes of Sana, Vrbas, and Dubica, while Lower Pounje was part of the parish of Zagreb) as lower Slavonia, where the parish of Sana served as seat of Babonić family, and later the Blagaj family, and southern were parts were the parishes of Pset and Pliva. In the 13th and 14th century, a region called Donji Kraji (parish of Pliva), located in today's southern Bosanska Krajina developed, and was first mentioned as a property of the Diocese of Bosnia and claimed by the Bosnian Banate.

By the end of the 14th century, the Ottoman Empire had significantly expanded into the western Balkans in a series of wars, and the Turkish westward incursions eventually made this region an Ottoman borderland. Jajce had fallen to the Ottoman Turks in 1463, marking the downfall of the Kingdom of Bosnia, although was later taken from the Ottoman Turks and organized as defensive Banate of Jajce. The Battle of Krbava Field in 1493 effectively ended the Kingdom of Hungary's persistent hold over the entire region, restricting them to fortified cities, and when Jajce fell again in 1528, Ottoman rule persisted almost until the end of the 19th century.

In the late 15th century, a local Croatian lord (knez), Juraj Mikuličić, erected a fort in the village of Bužim near Bihać, fearing the advancing Ottoman army. Mikuličić died in 1495, but the Bužim fort would not pass to Ottoman control until 1576. Bosanska Krajina was the last region in Bosnia to fall to the Ottoman Empire; the last city to fall was Bihać in 1592, which eventually paved the way for the Islamization of Bosnia and Herzegovina.

=== Ottoman period ===
After the crucial 1526 Battle of Mohács and the 1527 election in Cetin, Croatia became part of the Austrian Habsburg Empire. The Ottoman Empire formally established the Eyalet of Bosnia in 1580. The Croatian lands in general were reduced to a fraction of what they encompassed, and only the westernmost parts of today's Bosanska Krajina still resisted the Ottoman rule. Nevertheless, the Ottoman armies preferred to advance towards their targets in the northwest through more easily passable terrain, such as along the river Danube, for example Vienna was first besieged in 1529 after the army had gone through Osijek, Mohács, and Buda. The natural obstacles in and around the region, especially at the time, included the rivers Sava, Vrbas, Una and Sana, as well as the mountains such as Plješevica, Šator, Klekovača, Raduša, Grmeč, Kozara, and Vlašić.

Turkish incursions expanded further to the north, and Charles of Styria erected a new fortified city of Karlovac in 1579. In 1580, the Ottoman Turks responded by declaring the Pashaluk of Bosnia which unified all the Sanjaks, including territory in modern-day Croatia. As a result of the wars and border changes, the Catholic Croat population moved north, and was replaced with Orthodox Serbs.

The Bužim fort, under Ottoman control since 1576, was successfully held by the Ottoman Turks in numerous battles (1685, 1686, 1688, 1737) and it was also upgraded (1626, 1834) until their eventual surrender in the 19th century. The building remains to this day as a monument to the Ottoman conquest of Bosnia. Bihać held out longer than Bužim; it was a free royal city and at one time the capital of the Kingdom of Croatia (metropolis et propugnaculum totius regni Croatiae). But, in 1592 the Turkish army of about 20,000 under Hasan Predojević, an Ottoman vizier, attacked and forcefully occupied Bihać.

When the Ottoman Empire lost the War of the Holy League (1683–1690) to the Habsburg monarchy and her allies, and ceded Slavonia and Hungary to Austria at the 1699 Treaty of Karlowitz, the northern and western borders of the Sanjak of Bosnia (corresponding largely to the current borders of the modern Federation of Bosnia and Herzegovina), became a permanent frontier between the Austrian and Ottoman empires.

=== 19th century ===
In mid-1858, an uprising known as Pecija's First Revolt broke out in the region, resulting from Ottoman pressure against the local Serb populace. It was crushed by December. The Bosnian Frontier, like the rest of Bosnia and Herzegovina, participated in the Herzegovina Uprising against the Ottoman Empire (1875–1878).

=== World War II ===
During World War II, Bosanska Krajina was known for its very strong resistance to the Fascist regime of the Independent State of Croatia. The local Serb population in Bosanska Krajina was targeted in the Genocide of Serbs in the Independent State of Croatia by the regime's Croat and Bosniak bands, serving as an overture to future conflicts at the end of the 20th century. The anti-fascist Yugoslav Partisan movement in the Bosanska Krajina region was more ethnically diverse than in any other part of former Yugoslavia during World War II. In the winter of 1942–1943, the Yugoslav Partisans established the Republic of Bihać in Bosanska Krajina. Soon afterwards, Bosanska Krajina was also the place of historical agreements that have taken place in Jajce and Mrkonjić Grad in 1943, ones that established the Republic of Bosnia and Herzegovina in its current borders, as well as the Socialist Federal Republic of Yugoslavia.

=== Bosnian War ===
Ethnic Composition in Bosanska Krajina (1991, 1994)
	1991	1994
Serbs	625,000	875,000
Bosniaks and Croats	550,000	50,000

During the 1992-95 Bosnian War, Bosanska Krajina was divided between Republika Srpska, the Republic of Bosnia and Herzegovina, and the Autonomous Province of Western Bosnia. The Serb entity of SAO Bosanska Krajina was established in summer 1991. The region was also a place of concentration camps, including Manjača and Omarska where Bosniaks were held, tortured, raped, and killed.

For the past two years, non-Serbs in the Bosanska Krajina area have been "cleansed" through systematic persecution that includes torture, murder, rape, beatings, harassment, de jure discrimination, intimidation, expulsion from homes, confiscation of property, bombing of businesses, dismissal from work, outlawing of all scripts except the Cyrillic in public institutions, and the destruction of cultural objects such as mosques and Catholic churches.

— Human Rights Watch report 1994

== Demography ==
The population of the region numbered almost one million before the Bosnian War. The composition of the current population of Bosanska Krajina has dramatically changed, because of expulsions, forced relocation and emigration during the Bosnian war in 1992–95.

== Economy ==
In the immediate aftermath of World War II Bosanska Krajina was considered one of the poorest regions of Bosnia and Herzegovina. This poverty was a contributing factor to 1950 Cazin Uprising against the communist government, the only such uprising in post-war Bosnia and Herzegovina and Yugoslavia.

The later economic boom and prosperity of Bosanska Krajina was mostly due to planned urban development programs that were created specifically for this region in early and mid-1970s by Urban Institute in Banja Luka. The development was further stimulated by the simplification of the banking system that encouraged investments in resource processing industry. As a result, the region has seen a boom in agricultural and industrial production.

Agrokomerc, a food manufacturing industry located in northwest region was the largest food manufacturer in Bosnia and Herzegovina and former Yugoslavia. Other industries included chemical industry Saniteks in Velika Kladuša, electronics industry Rudi Cajevec in Banja Luka, Textile industry Sana in Bosanski Novi as well as a range of wood and food processing companies that stimulated an economic boom in this region. There was also a significant ore industry developed around the Kozara Mountain.

== Transport and aviation ==
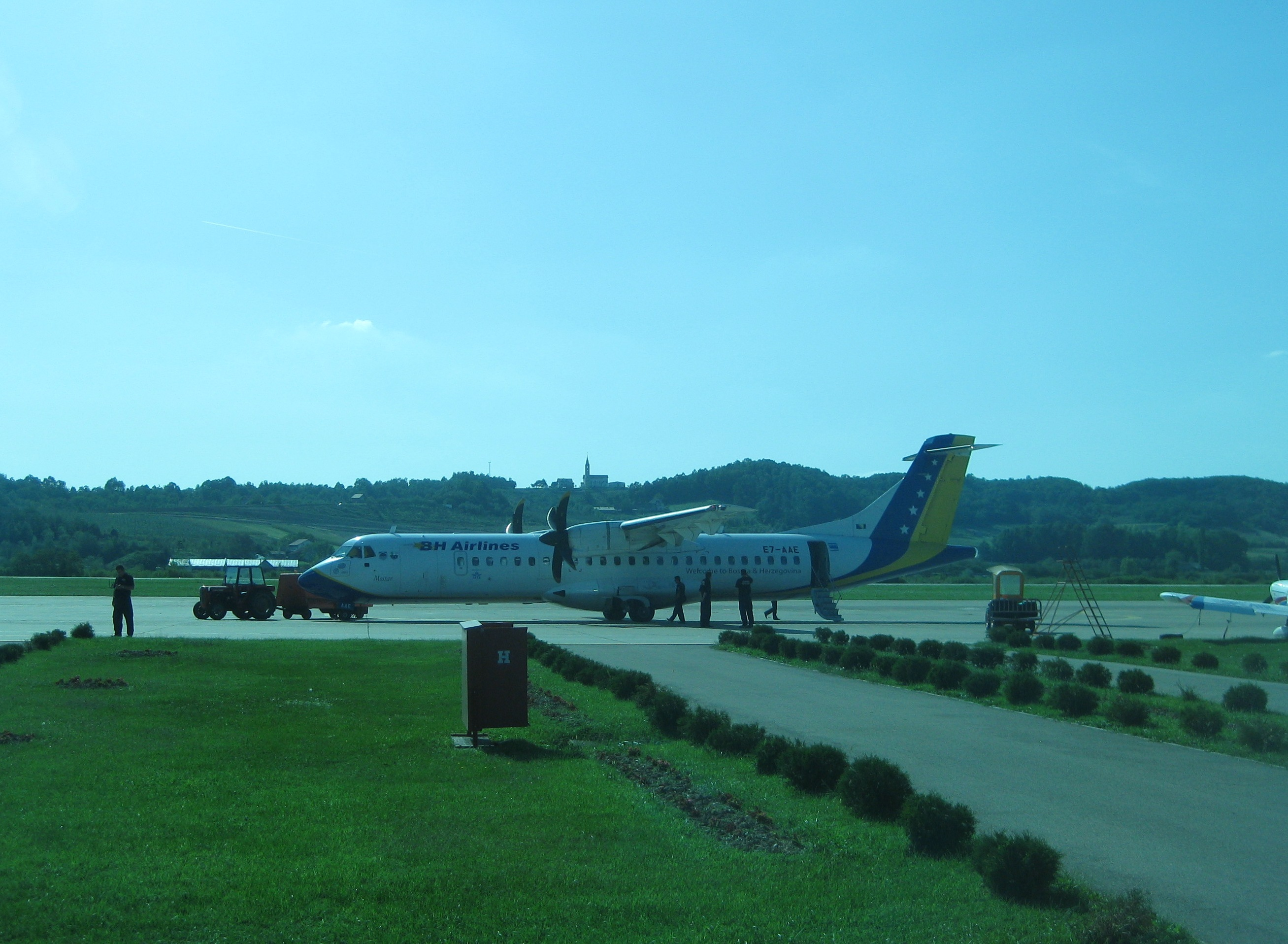
B&H Airlines ATR 72 at Banja Luka airport preparing for the flight to Zürich, August 2010

The expressway E-661 (locally known as M-16) leads north to Croatia, existing as an expressway from Banja Luka to Laktaši and as a two-lane road from Laktaši to the Bosnian/Croatian border. This second section of the road is currently being upgraded to an expressway.

Under planning is two new expressways. One from Prijedor to Bosanska Dubica to shorten the travelling time to Zagreb. The other one is to the east heading towards Doboj and connecting Bosanska Krajina to the important Corridor Vc in Bosnia and Herzegovina.

Banja Luka International Airport is located 23 km from Banja Luka. There are multiple airlines and charter flights also operate from the airport.

Željava Air Base, situated on the border between Croatia and Bosnia and Herzegovina under Plješevica Mountain, near the town of Bihać in Bosnia and Herzegovina, was the largest underground airport and military airbase in the former Yugoslavia and one of the largest in Europe.

Prijedor also has an airfield in the north-eastern part of the city in the area of Urije. The airfield has a fleet of light aircraft and sailplanes. The airfield was used by the Yugoslav Partisans and was the first operative Partisan airfield during World War II.

Bosanska Krajina is the hub of the railway services in Bosnia and Herzegovina, comprising more than one-half of the railway network of Bosnia and Herzegovina. Services operate to the northern and western Bosnian towns Banja Luka, Prijedor, Bosanski Novi and Bihać. The rail network also operates to Zagreb (twice daily), and Belgrade.

== Gallery ==
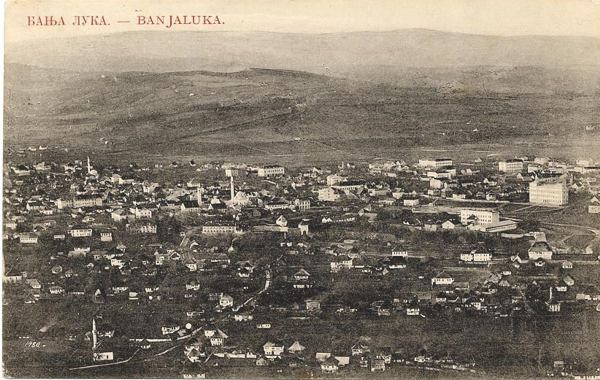
Banja Luka at the turn of the 20th century

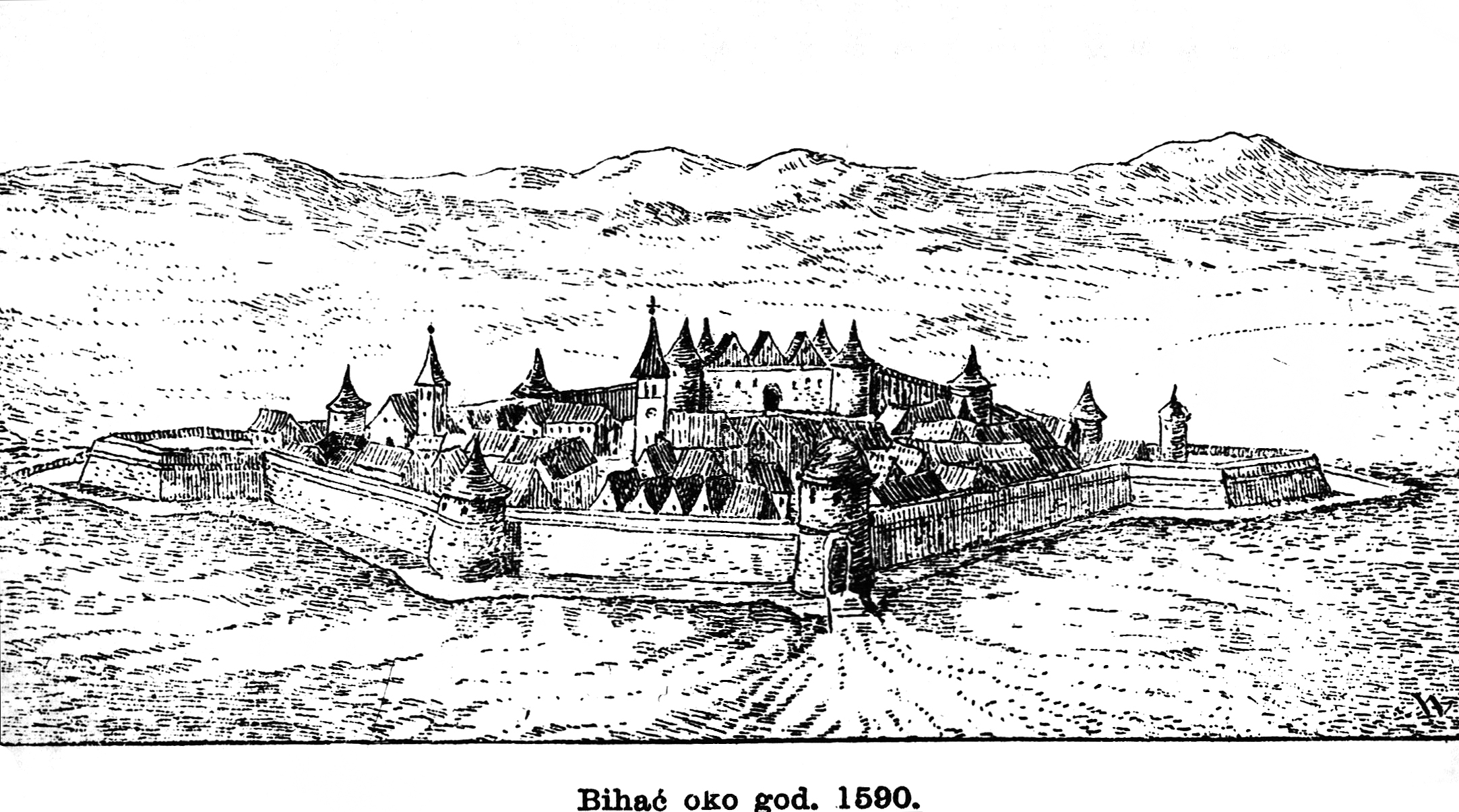
Bihać fortified place in 1590

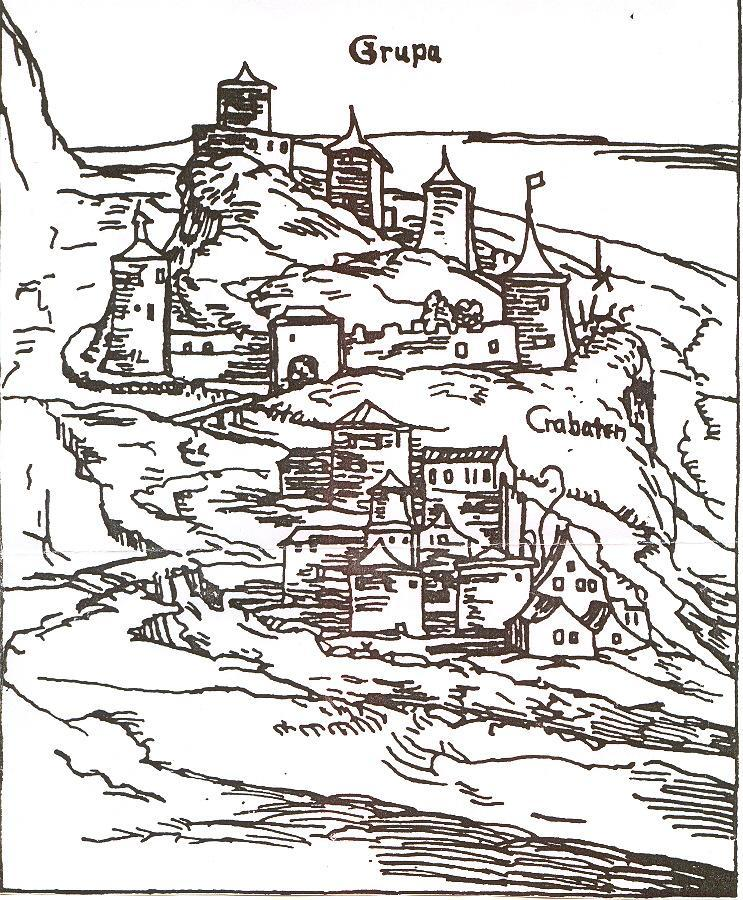
Drawing of Bosanska Krupa during the Middle Ages

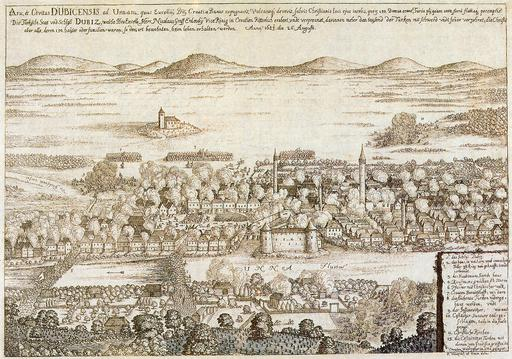
An old drawing of Bosanska Dubica

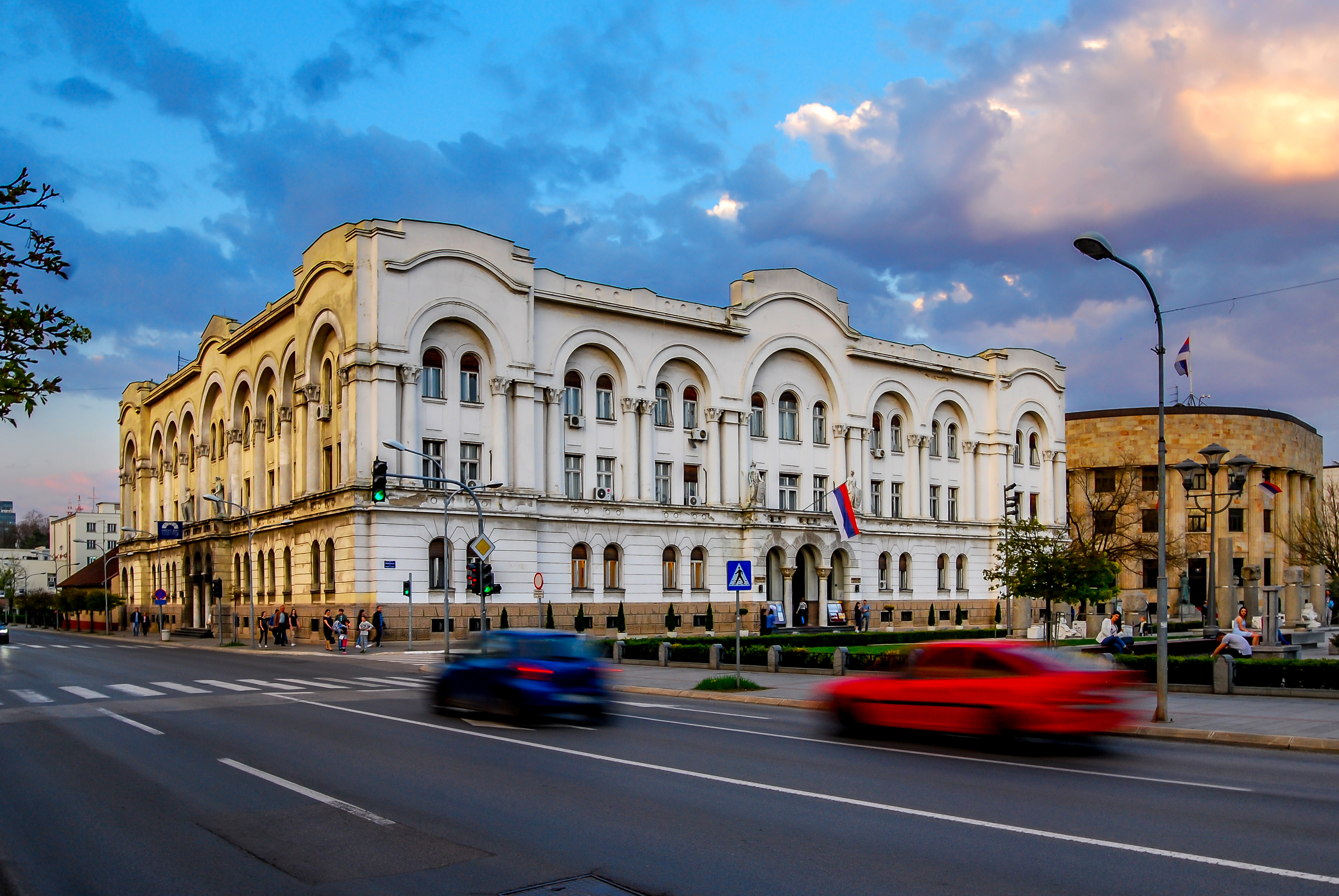
Banski dvor in Banja Luka

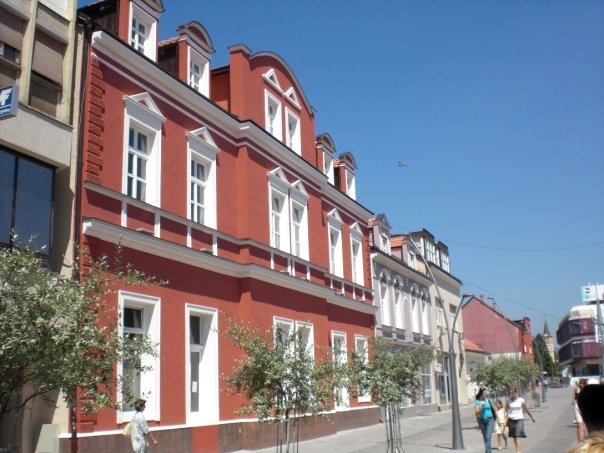
Prijedor

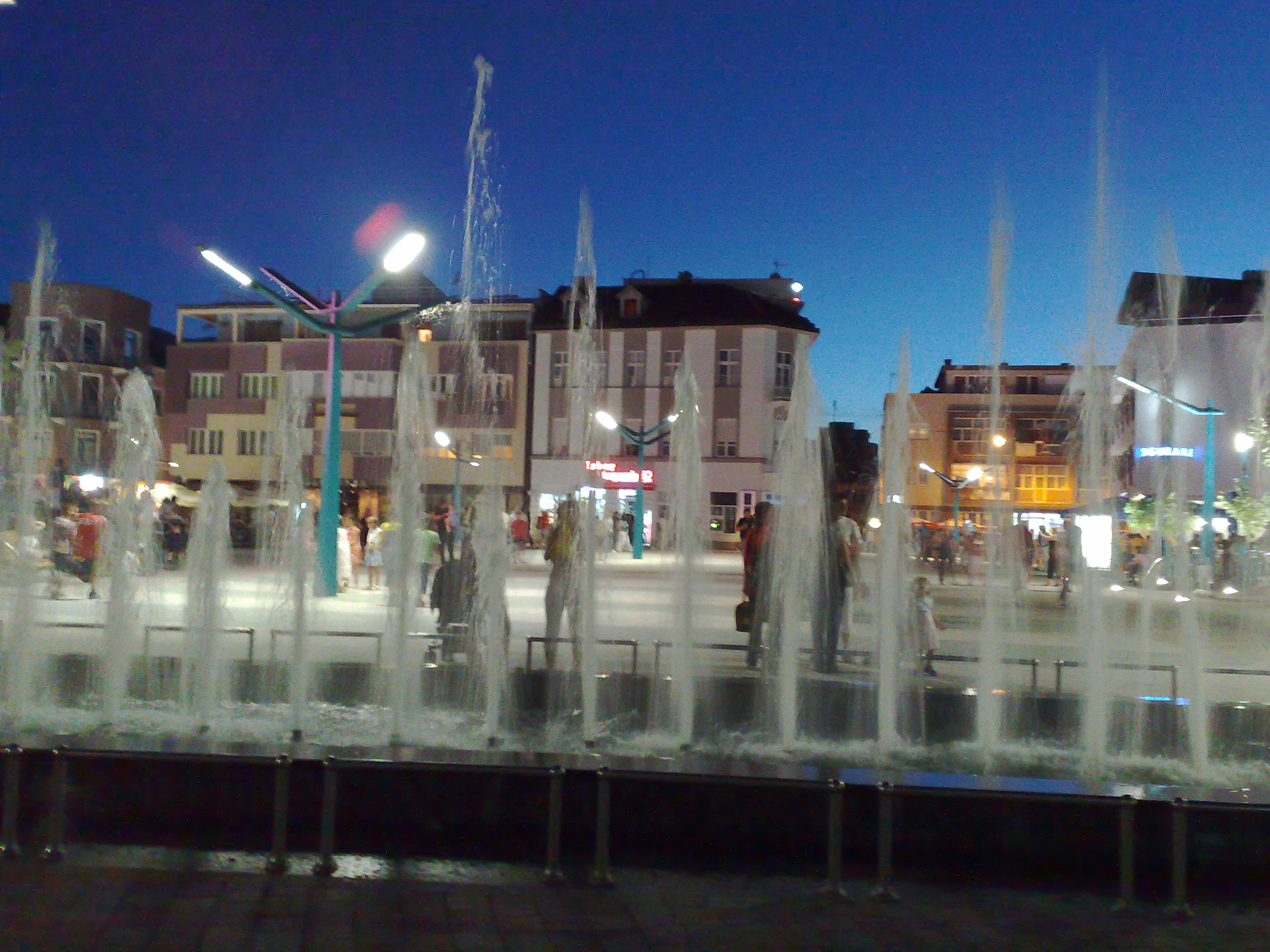
Bihać

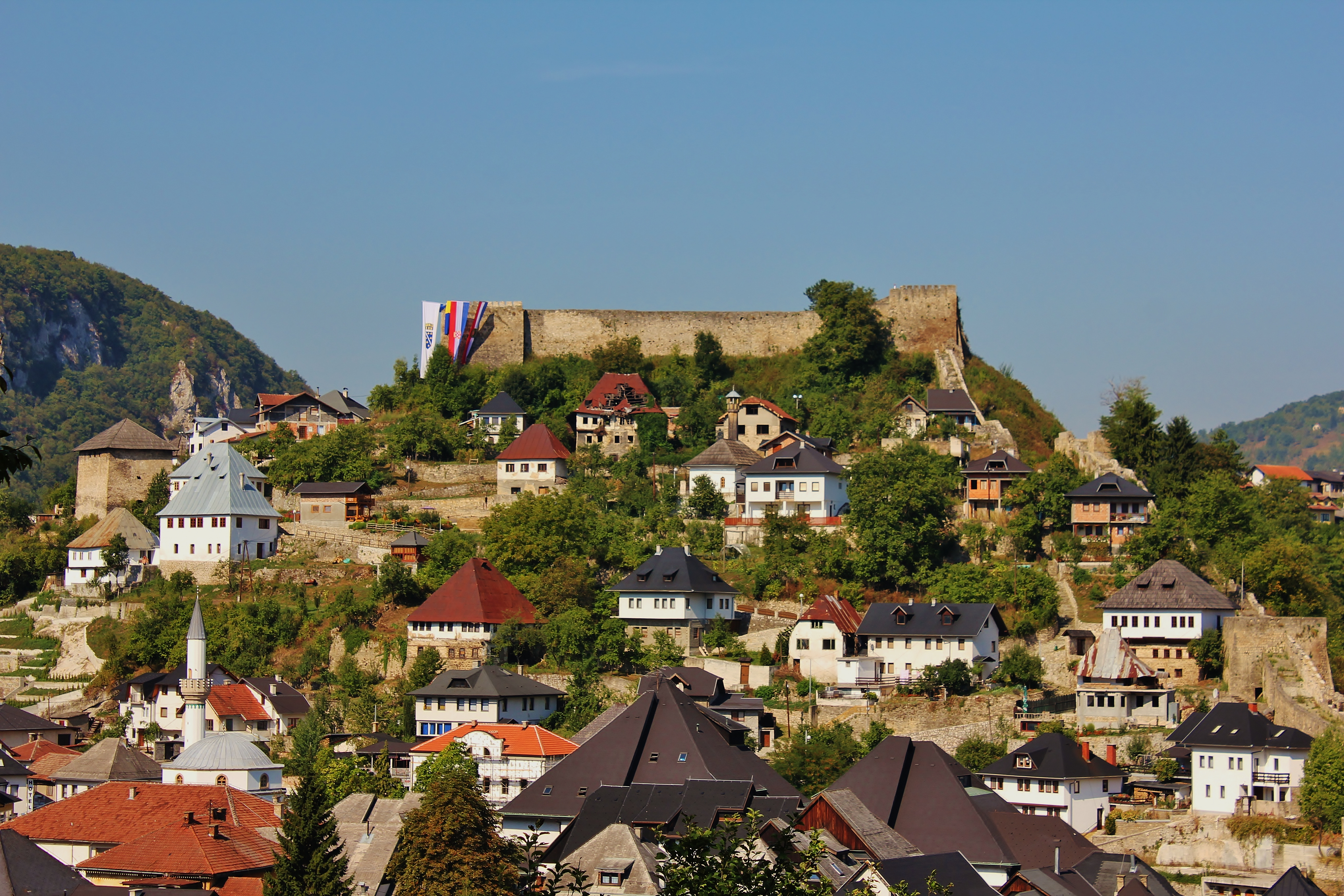
Jajce

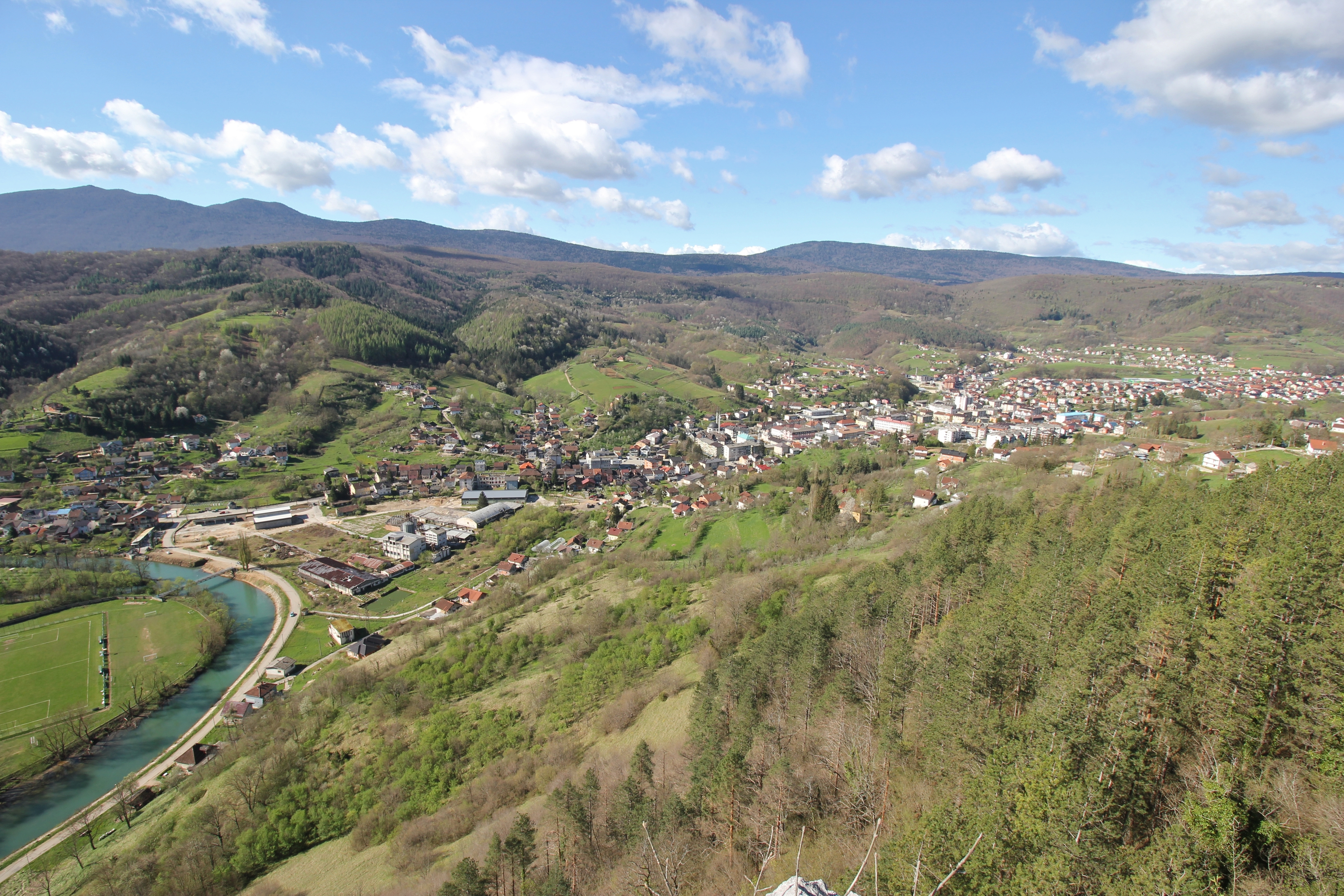
Ključ

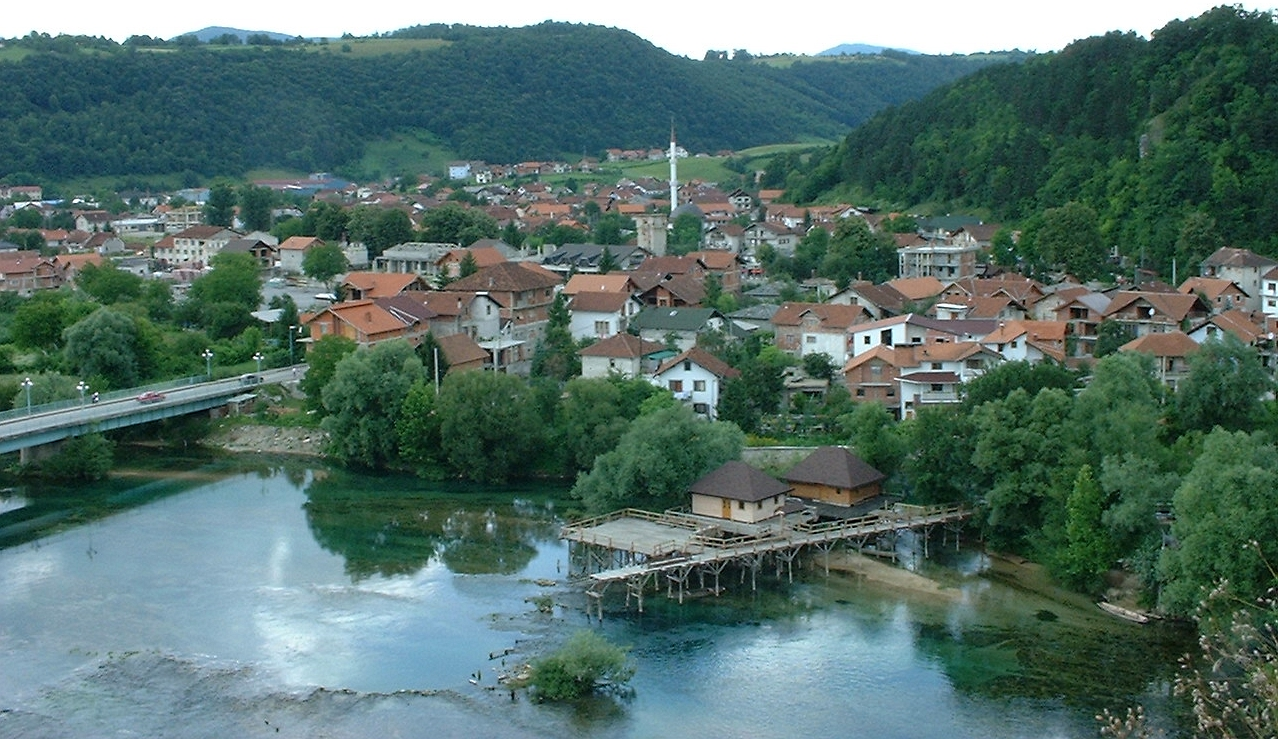
Bosanska Krupa

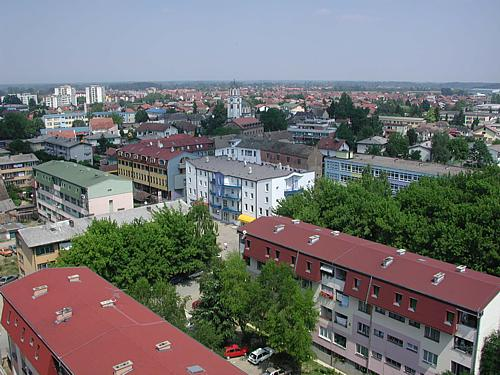
Bosanska Gradiška

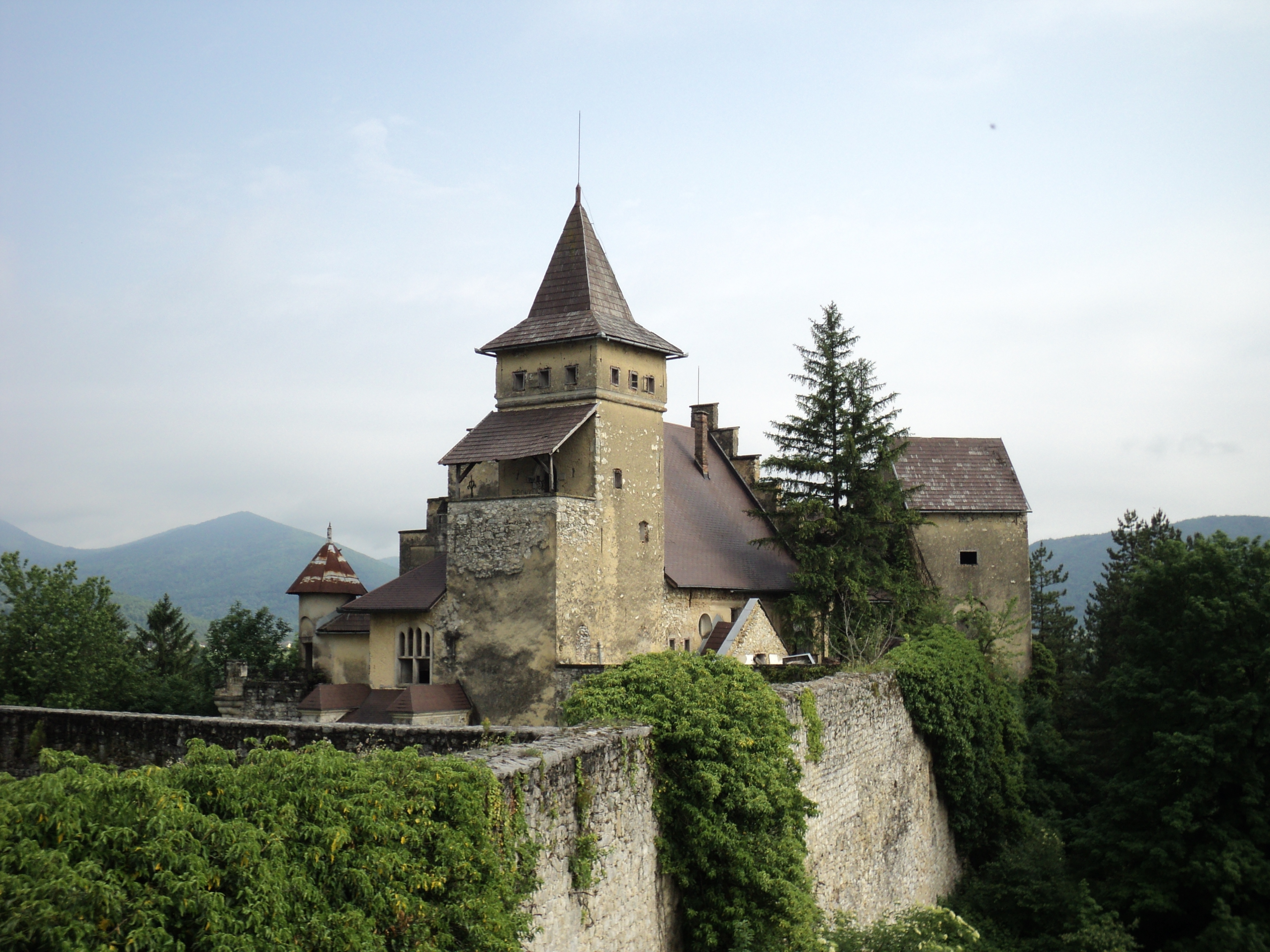
Ostrožac Castle

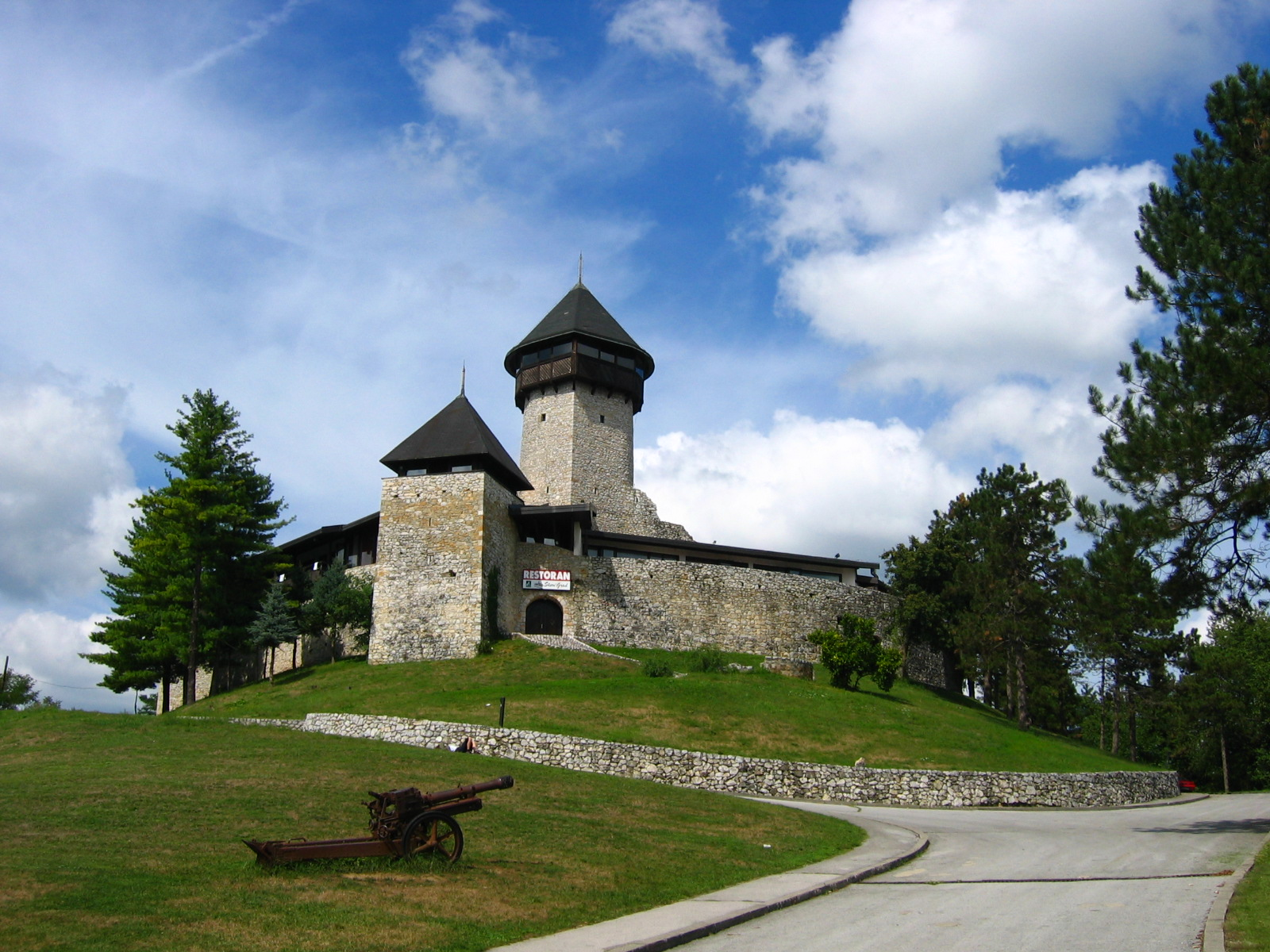
Velika Kladuša Castle

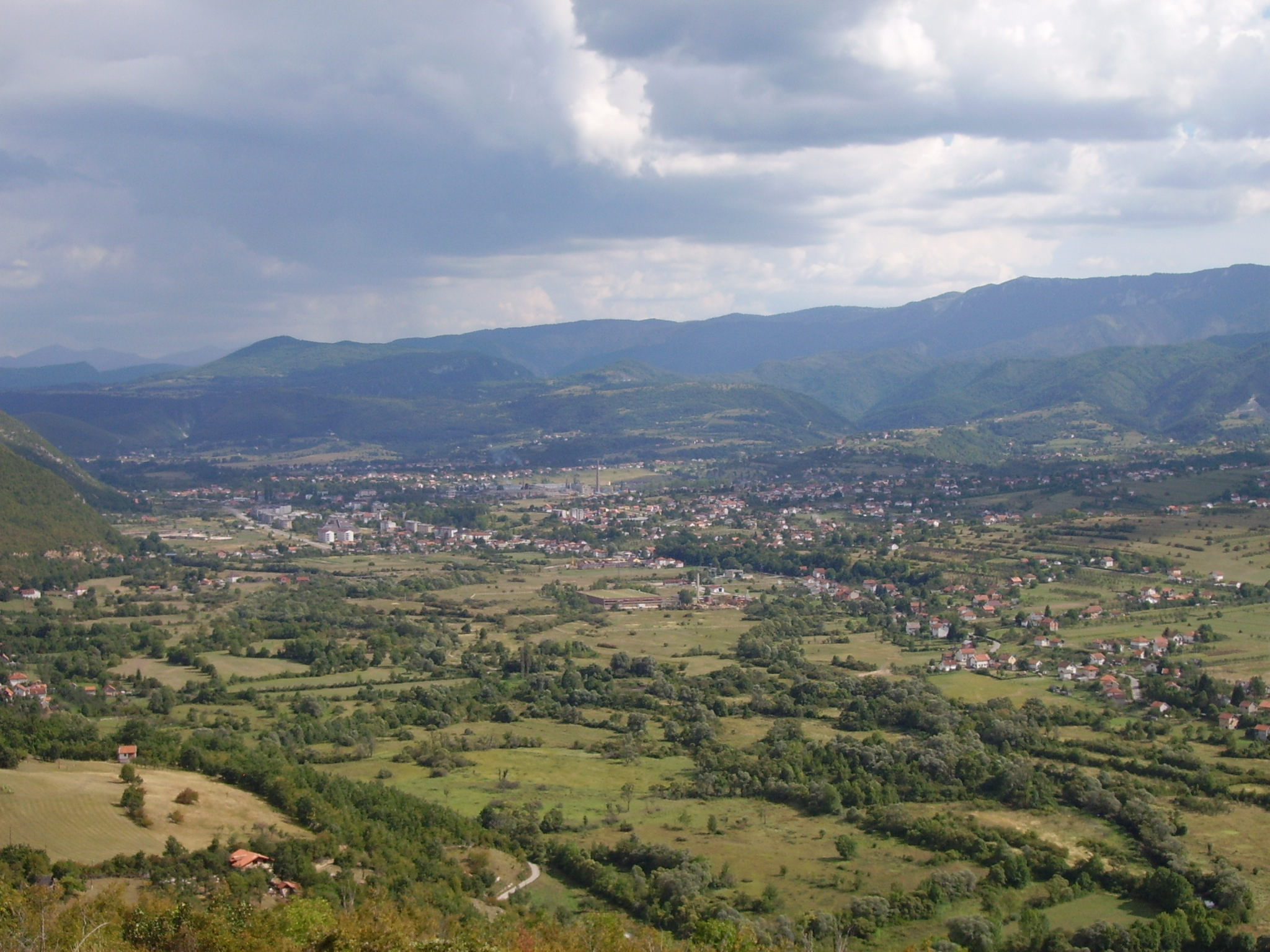
Drvar

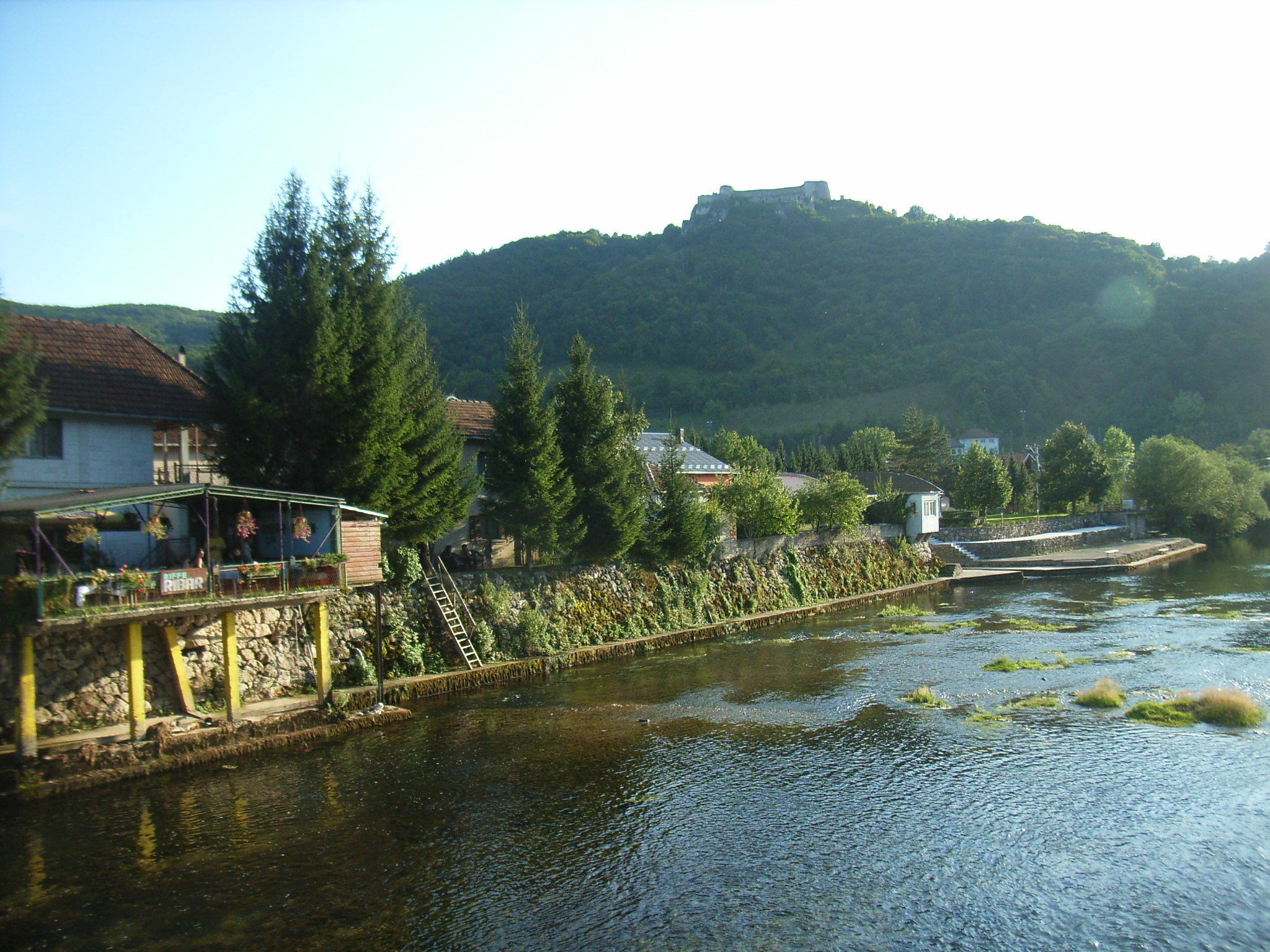
Kulen Vakuf

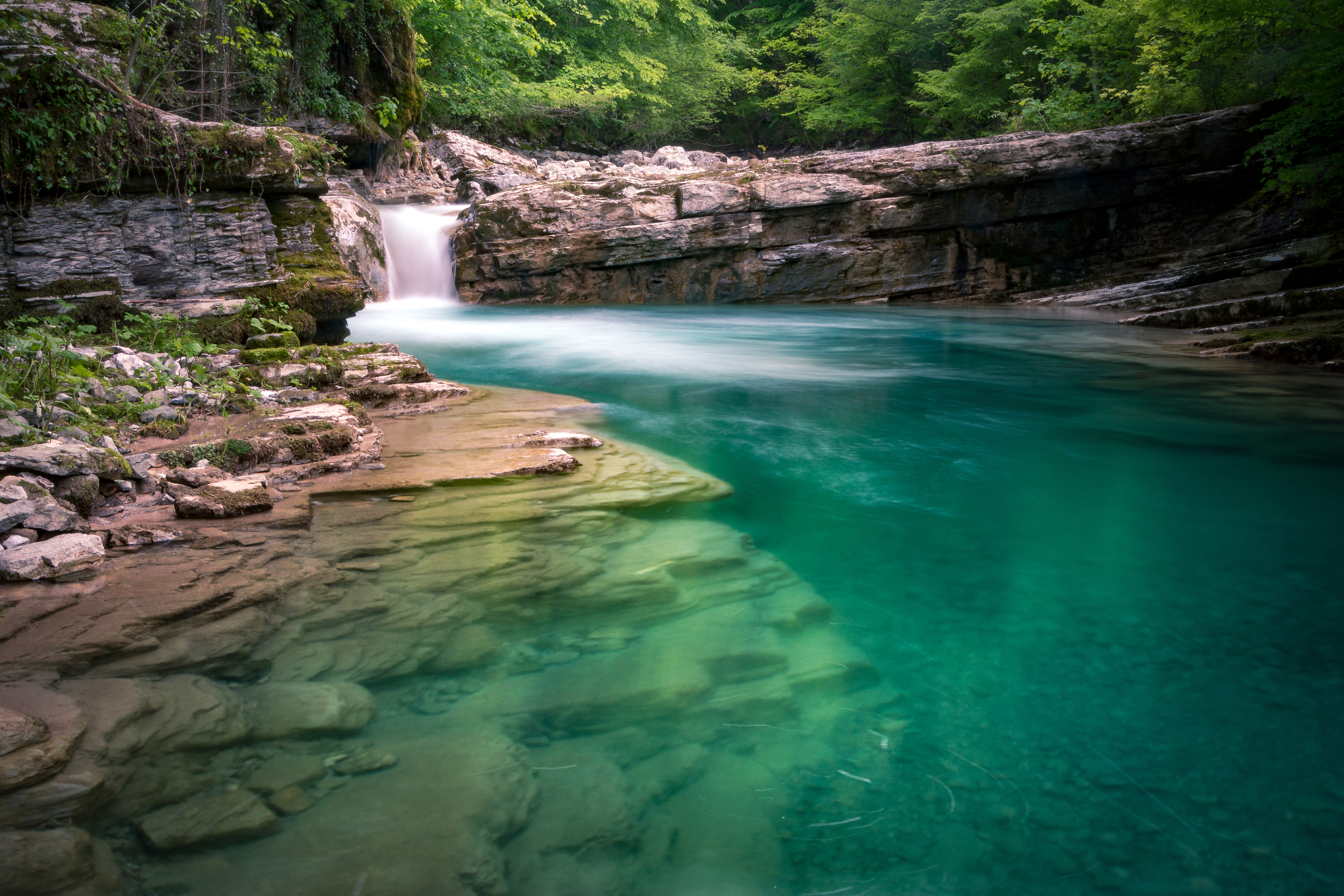
Cvrcka

== See also ==
- Krajina
- Regions of Bosnia and Herzegovina

== Sources ==
- Fine, John Van Antwerp Jr. (1991). The Early Medieval Balkans: A Critical Survey from the Sixth to the Late Twelfth Century. University of Michigan Press. ISBN 978-0-472-08149-3.
- Mrgić, Jelena; Živković, Tibor (2008). Северна Босна: 13-16. век. Историјски институт. ISBN 9788677430719.
