= Branešci =

Branešci may refer to:

- Branešci, Serbia, a village near Čajetina, Serbia
- Branešci, Croatia, a village near Pakrac, Croatia
- Branešci Donji, a village near Čelinac, Bosnia and Herzegovina
- Branešci Gornji, a village near Čelinac, Bosnia and Herzegovina
