= Uzlomac =

Coordinates: 44.5900°N 17.0400°E

Uzlomac is a long mountain in Bosnia and Herzegovina (Bosnia), east from line direction Maslovare – Vrbanjci – Kotor Varoš – Čelinac. It stretches from the southeast to the northwest through the mountainous area, from Kruševica River (west of Borja mountains) to Jošavka. Its maximum altitude is 1,018 metres (3,340 ft).

The mountain is very rich in mixed forests resources and hunting wildlife, including Bosnian endemic quarry mammals. Its forest wealth is diverse: deciduous oak and deciduous beech. It also is rich in water resources: springs, streams and rivers. On Uzlomac many tributaries of Vrbanja river, Usora and Ukrina rise, i.e. tributaries of Vrbas and Bosna confluences.

== See also ==
- Vrbanjci
- Kotor Varoš
- Čelinac
- Vrbanja river
- Bosanka (river)
- Jezerka
- Bosnian endemic quarry mammals
