= Popovac (Čelinac) =

Popovac Поповац
- Village
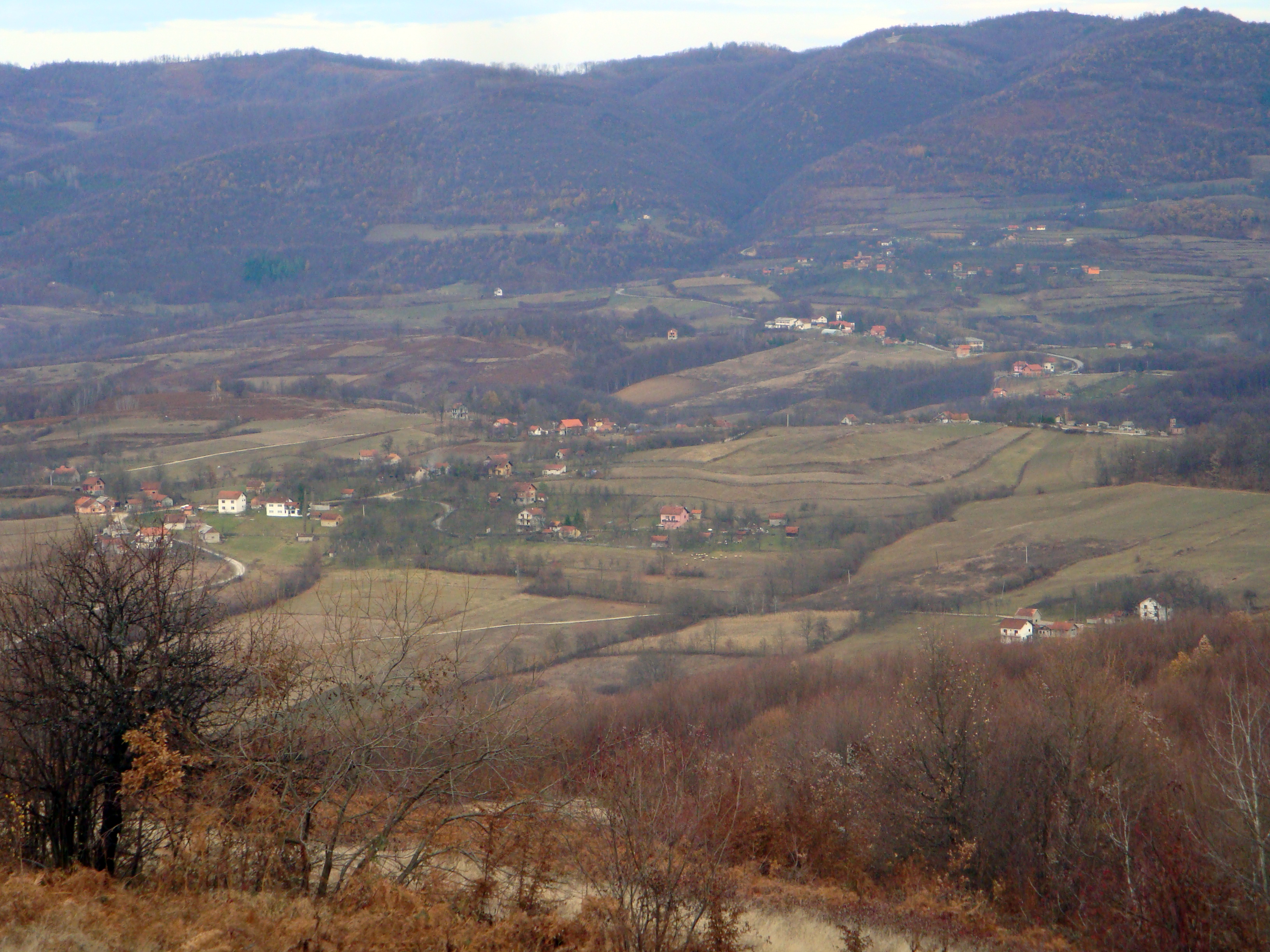
- Popovac – Panorama of the settlement

- Location in Bosnia and Herzegovina
- Coordinates: 44.6786°N 17.2822°E
- Country: Bosnia and Herzegovina
- Entity: Republika Srpska
- Municipality: Čelinac

Population (1991)
  - Total: 306
- Time zone: Central European
- Area code: +387 (051)

Popovac (Serbian Cyrillic: Поповац) is a settlement in the Bosnia and Herzegovina, Republika Srpska entity, Čelinac Municipality. In 1991, the village had 306 inhabitants.

== History ==
Popovac is birthplace of Radoslav Brđanin, a convicted Bosnian Serb war criminal. In 2004 he was sentenced to 32 years imprisonment by the International Criminal Tribunal for the Former Yugoslavia for crimes committed during the Bosnian War. The sentence, which he is serving in Denmark, was reduced by two years on appeal in 2008.

== Population ==
Popovac Census 2013.: Total of 190 inhabitants
Census Year	1991.	1981.	1971.
Serbs	303 (99.02%)	443 (98.88%)	594 (99.83%)
Croats	–	–	1 (0.168%)
Bosniaks	–	1 (0.223%)	–
Yugoslavs	1 (0.327%)	1 (0.223%)	–
Other and unknown	2 (0.654%)	3 (0.670%)	–
Total	306	448	595
