= Memići =

Memići may refer to the following places in Bosnia and Herzegovina:

- Memići (Čelinac)
- Memići (Kalesija)
