= Big Radio 4 =

Bosnian radio station

- Banja Luka; Bosnia and Herzegovina
- Broadcast area: Banja Luka
- Frequency: Banja Luka 98.6 MHz
- RDS: BIG 4

Programming
- Language: Serbian language
- Format: Local news, talk and music
- Network: Big Radio

Ownership
- Owner: BIG RADIO d.o.o. Banja Luka
- Sister stations: Big Radio 1 Big Radio 2 Big Radio 3

History
- Founded: 2020

Technical information
- Licensing authority: CRA BiH
- Transmitter coordinates: 44°46′N 17°11′E
- Repeater: Banja Luka/Krčmarice

Links
- Webcast: Listen Live
- Website: www.bigradiobl.com

Big Radio 4 is a Bosnian local commercial radio station, broadcasting from Banja Luka, Bosnia and Herzegovina. This radio station broadcasts a variety of programs such as domestic Ex Yu pop music for all ages and local news. The owner of the radio station is the company BIG RADIO d.o.o. Banja Luka.

After BHRT has abandoned the launch of the BH Radio 2 program, reserved frequencies were allocated to other interested stations across Bosnia and Herzegovina through the competition where Big Radio met the criteria for Big Radio 4 which was established in 2020.

The program is mainly produced in Serbian at one FM frequency (Banja Luka 98.6 MHz) and it is available in the city of Banja Luka as well as in nearby cities and municipalities, including Laktaši, Čelinac, Prnjavor, Gradiška and Kotor Varoš.

Estimated number of listeners of Big Radio 4 is around 203,988.

== Frequencies ==
- Banja Luka 98.6 MHz

== See also ==
- List of radio stations in Bosnia and Herzegovina
- Big Radio 2
- Radio A
- Pop FM
- RSG Radio
