= Bosanka (river) =

- Location within Bosnia and Herzegovina
- Native name: Босанка (Serbian)

Location
- Country: Bosnia and Herzegovina

Physical characteristics
- Source
  - location: Uzlomac
  - elevation: 800 m (2,600 ft)
- Mouth
  - location: Vrbanjci
  - coordinates: 44.5903°N 17.4127°E
- Length: 6 km (3.7 mi)

Basin features
- Progression: Vrbanja→ Vrbas→ Sava→ Danube→ Black Sea

The Bosanka (Serbian Cyrillic: Босанка) is a right tributary of the Vrbanja river in Bosnia and Herzegovina. It rises on the southern slopes of the mountain Uzlomac (about 800 m above sea level) in four streams. The sources are between Rapno brdo (north) and Matrakova kosa (south). The length is about 6 km. Flowing through Petrovići, and its mouth between the villages of Dabovci and Dudići. The mouth is downstream from Vrbanjci, along highway M-4 (Banja Luka - Doboj). The long history of the name it was Plitka rika, and village nearby to it, in this regard - Plitska (today Vrbanjci).

The only significant (left) tributary to Bosanka is Vodalka. The basin Bosanke and Vodalke, fifties, there were eight water-mills. On the slopes of one of Uzlomac’s southern peaks (about 800 m) separating the confluences of Vrbanja and Velika Usora. On the eastern side of Vodalke are waterflows of Zmajevac, Pirizevac and Breska, and to the west: Jelovac, Pušića potok, Svinjara and Jošavka.

During the War in Bosnia inhabitants in the confluence of Bosanka were expelled and murdered. This is especially true in the village of Vrbanjci, Večići, Hrvaćani, Garići and Rujevica.

== See also ==
- Vrbanjci
- Večići
- Kotor Varoš
