= Šahinovići =

Šahinovići may refer to:

- Šahinovići (Čelinac), a village in Bosnia and Herzegovina
- Šahinovići (Kiseljak), a village in Bosnia and Herzegovina
