= Opsječko =

- Village
- Location within Bosnia and Herzegovina
- Coordinates: 44°42′28″N 17°22′33″E
- Country: Bosnia and Herzegovina
- Entity: Republika Srpska
- Municipality: Čelinac
- Time zone: UTC+1 (CET)
  - Summer (DST): UTC+2 (CEST)

Opsječko (Serbian Cyrillic: Опсјечко) is a village in the municipality of Čelinac, Republika Srpska, Bosnia and Herzegovina.
