= Vijačani Gornji =

Vijačani Gornji Вијачани Горњи
- Village
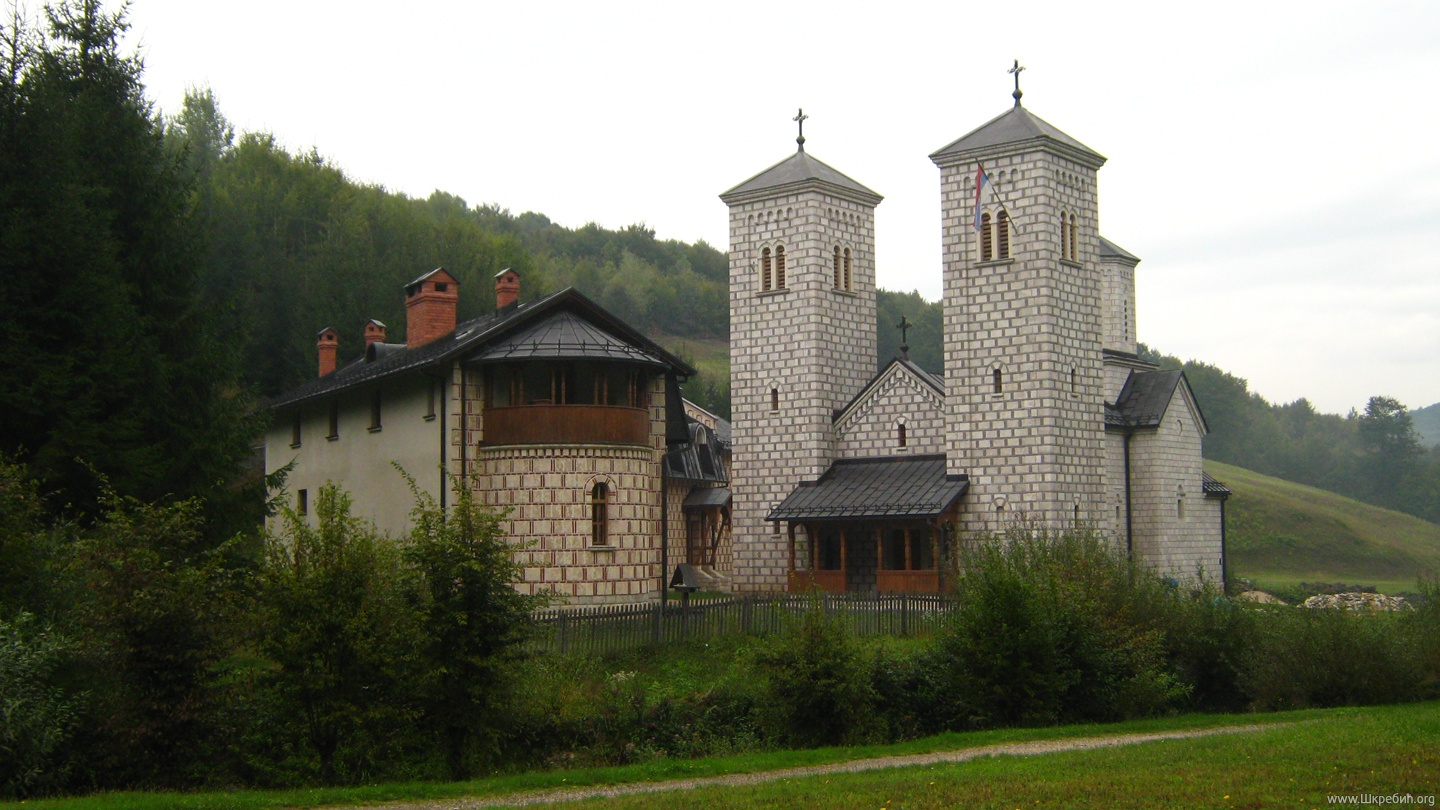

- Location within Bosnia and Herzegovina
- Coordinates: 44°45′26″N 17°38′18″E
- Country: Bosnia and Herzegovina
- Entity: Republika Srpska
- Municipality: Čelinac
- Time zone: UTC+1 (CET)
  - Summer (DST): UTC+2 (CEST)

Vijačani Gornji (Serbian Cyrillic: Вијачани Горњи) is a village in the municipality of Čelinac, Republika Srpska, Bosnia and Herzegovina.
