= Kablovi =

- Village
- Location within Bosnia and Herzegovina
- Coordinates: 44°40′N 17°16′E
- Country: Bosnia and Herzegovina
- Entity: Republika Srpska
- Municipality: Čelinac
- Time zone: UTC+1 (CET)
  - Summer (DST): UTC+2 (CEST)

Kablovi (Cyrillic: Каблови) is a village in the municipality of Čelinac, Republika Srpska, Bosnia and Herzegovina.
