= Šnjegotina Velika =

- Village
- Location within Bosnia and Herzegovina
- Coordinates: 44°42′17″N 17°31′25″E
- Country: Bosnia and Herzegovina
- Entity: Republika Srpska
- Municipality: Čelinac

Šnjegotina Velika (Serbian Cyrillic: Шњеготина Велика) is a village in the municipality of Čelinac, Republika Srpska, Bosnia and Herzegovina.
