= Lađevci (Čelinac) =

Lađevci Лађевци
- Village
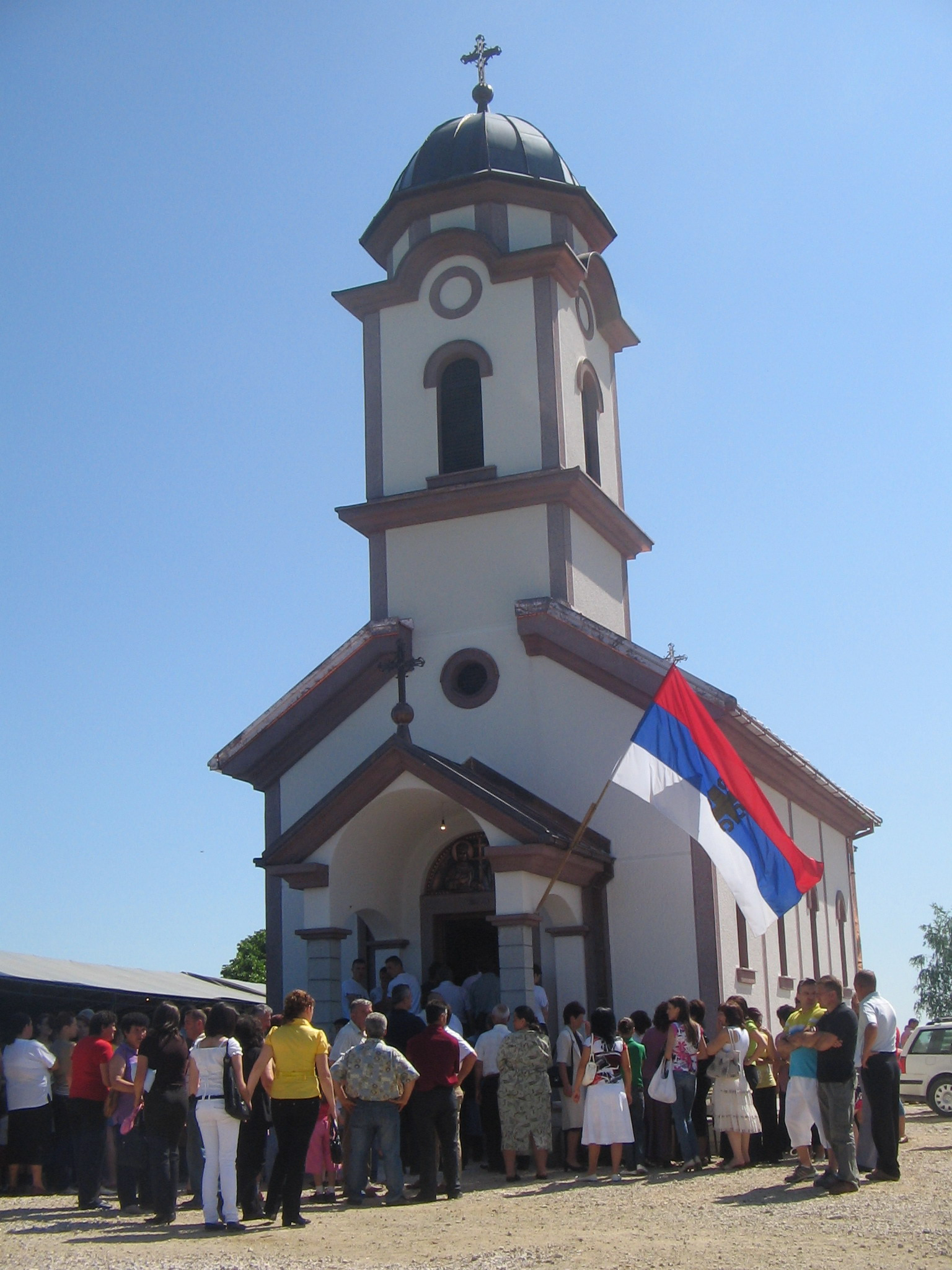
- Serbian Orthodox church in Lađevci

- Location within Bosnia and Herzegovina
- Coordinates: 44°46′48″N 17°27′36″E
- Country: Bosnia and Herzegovina
- Entity: Republika Srpska
- Municipality: Čelinac
- Time zone: UTC+1 (CET)
  - Summer (DST): UTC+2 (CEST)

Lađevci (Cyrillic: Лађевци) is a village in the municipality of Čelinac, Republika Srpska, Bosnia and Herzegovina.
