= Crni Vrh (Čelinac) =

Crni Vrh Црни Врх
- Village
- Location within Bosnia and Herzegovina
- Coordinates: 44°46′28″N 17°24′22″E
- Country: Bosnia and Herzegovina
- Entity: Republika Srpska
- Municipality: Čelinac
- Time zone: UTC+1 (CET)
  - Summer (DST): UTC+2 (CEST)

Crni Vrh (Cyrillic: Црни Врх) is a village in the municipality of Čelinac, Republika Srpska, Bosnia and Herzegovina.
