= Balte =

- Village
- Location within Bosnia and Herzegovina
- Coordinates: 44°40′32″N 17°14′36″E
- Country: Bosnia and Herzegovina
- Entity: Republika Srpska
- Municipality: Čelinac
- Time zone: UTC+1 (CET)
  - Summer (DST): UTC+2 (CEST)

Balte (Serbian Cyrillic: Балте) is a village in the municipality of Čelinac, Republika Srpska, Bosnia and Herzegovina.

According to the 1991 census, the population was 236, of whom 234 called themselves Serbs.
