= Radoslav Brđanin =

Serbian war criminal (1948–2022)

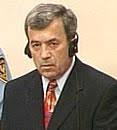
- Born: 9 February 1948; Čelinac, PR Bosnia and Herzegovina, FPR Yugoslavia
- Died: 7 September 2022 (aged 74); Banja Luka, Bosnia and Herzegovina
- Conviction: Crimes against humanity
- Penalty: 30 years

Details
- Date apprehended: 6 July 1999
- Imprisoned at: Denmark

Radoslav Brđanin (9 February 1948 – 7 September 2022) was a Bosnian Serb political leader and convicted war criminal. In 2004, he was sentenced to 32 years imprisonment by the International Criminal Tribunal for the Former Yugoslavia for crimes committed during the Bosnian War. The sentence, which he served in Denmark, was reduced by two years on appeal in 2008.

== Early life ==
He was born on 9 February 1948 in Čelinac, SR Bosnia Herzegovina, Socialist Federal Republic of Yugoslavia. A civil engineer by profession, he worked in the building trade until 1990. At that time, given the difficulty to maintain the unity of Yugoslavia, certain regions in Bosnia Herzegovina began to organise themselves into regional structures based on the concept of Municipality Assemblies such as existed under the 1974 Yugoslavian Constitution. The Municipal Assembly of Bosanska Krajina, based in Banja Luka, was created in April and May 1991. Brđanin was its first vice-president.

== War crimes ==
On 9 January 1992, the Serbian Republic of Bosnia and Herzegovina was proclaimed and re-baptised as the Republika Srpska on 12 August 1992. The leaders of the SDS felt the large Bosniak and Croatian population, living in the zones they had claimed as part of the Serbian Republic of Bosnia and Herzegovina, presented a major obstacle to the establishment of their State. The establishment of this State and the protection of its boundaries therefore implied, in time, the complete evacuation, or "ethnic cleansing", of practically all Bosnian Bosniaks and Croats.

Crises groups were formed to act as organs of coordination and execution of the main elements of the operational phase of the plan and to take over the administration of the regions and the municipalities. The Autonomous Region of Krajina (ARK) Crisis Staff was set up on 5 May 1992 with Brdjanin as its President. Brđanin played a role of the first order in the campaign to create an ethnically pure Serb State. His position enabled him to facilitate the ethnic cleansing by putting all of the instruments of State power (media, central administration, housing authority, health service, police, legal system, means of production and employment) in the hands of the governing bodies and those persons committed to an ethnically pure Serb State. He purportedly signed the decisions and orders of the Crisis Staff of the ARK, which in turn instructed and compelled the municipal Crisis Staffs into taking action. Certain members of these cells participated directly in carrying out the alleged crimes: persecutions, deportations, murders, torture, destruction.

Brđanin was arrested by the SFOR on 6 July 1999 and transferred on the same day to the International Criminal Tribunal for the Former Yugoslavia.

== Judgment and conviction ==
Brđanin made an initial appearance before the ICTY on 12 July 1999. He pleaded not guilty to the twelve counts of indictment brought against him, including those of genocide and extermination. The Trial Chamber of the ICTY was satisfied beyond reasonable doubt that during the period covered in the indictment before then, Brđanin was a leading political figure in the ARK and held key positions. He played a significant political role on all three levels of the Bosnian Serb leadership: municipal, regional and republic.

The Trial Chamber was satisfied that Brđanin shared with the Bosnian Serb leadership support for the Strategic Plan, intended to link Serb-populated areas in BiH together, to gain control over these areas and to create a separate Bosnian Serb state, from which most non-Serbs would be permanently removed. The ICTY highlighted that he knew the Strategic Plan could only be implemented by the use of force and fear.

On 1 September 2004, Brđanin was sentenced by the Trial Chamber of the ICTY to 32 years imprisonment. The Tribunal found him guilty of the following counts on the grounds of his individual criminal responsibility (Art. 7 § 1 Statute):

1. Crimes against humanity (Art. 5 Statute: torture, deportation and forced transfer considered as an inhumane act)
2. Serious breaches of the Geneva Conventions of 1949 (Art 2 Statute: wilful killing torture)
3. Violations of the laws or customs of war (Art 3 Statute: wanton destruction of cities, towns and villages or devastation not justified by military necessity; destruction or willful damage done to institutions dedicated to religion.)

On 22 September 2004, Brđanin filed an appeal against this judgement. On 3 April 2007, the Appeals Chamber reversed the finding of the Trial Chamber that Brđanin's conduct had a substantial effect on the commission of torture in detention camps on grounds of lack of evidence. The Appeals Chamber also reversed Brđanin's conviction for wanton destruction of cities, towns or villages, or devastation not justified by military necessity to the extent that this conviction relates to the municipality of Bosanska Krupa. In light of the reduction of convictions, the Appeals Chamber reduced Brđanin's sentence by two years. He was transferred to Denmark on 4 March 2008 to serve his sentence.

== Release from prison and death ==
Brđanin’s application for early release was rejected in 2020 based on the seriousness of his offences and due to his failure to demonstrate that he was sufficiently rehabilitated. Upon serving two-thirds of his 30-year prison sentence, Brđanin was released early on health grounds on 3 September 2022. A few days after his arrival in Banja Luka, Brđanin was admitted to the intensive care of the University Clinical Centre in Banja Luka due to a deteriorating general state of health. He died on 7 September 2022.

RS President Zeljka Cvijanovic, Serb member of BiH Presidency Milorad Dodik and RS Prime Minister Radovan Viskovic sent a telegram of condolence to Brdjanin family. Dodik wrote that "with Brdjanin’s death we have lost a true patriot who sacrificed a large part of his life for freedom and existence of the Serb people in this region".
