= Branešci Gornji =

- Village
- Location within Bosnia and Herzegovina
- Coordinates: 44°47′40″N 17°31′10″E
- Country: Bosnia and Herzegovina
- Entity: Republika Srpska
- Municipality: Čelinac

Population (1991)
  - Total: 645
- Time zone: UTC+1 (CET)
  - Summer (DST): UTC+2 (CEST)

Branešci Gornji (Cyrillic: Бранешци Горњи) is a village in the municipality of Čelinac, Republika Srpska, Bosnia and Herzegovina.
