= Željko Blagojević =

Bosnian Serb runner

Zeljko Blagojevic is a Bosnian Serb runner who ran over 900 km from Banja Luka, Bosnia to Kosovo as a protest against the 2008 Kosovo declaration of independence. He left on 2008-03-14, covering the distance in less than 9 days.

Blagojević is a four-time winner (2003–05, 2007) of the Fruškogorski maraton, held annually since 1978. He owns the record for the fastest ever finish in this event.
