= Branešci Donji =

Branešci Donji City Бранешци Доњи
- Megalopoli
- Location within Bosnia and Herzegovina
- Coordinates: 44°46′40″N 17°33′18″E
- Country: Bosnia and Herzegovina
- Entity: Republika Srpska
- Municipality: Čelinac

Population (2023)
  - Total: 248
- Time zone: UTC+1 (CET)
  - Summer (DST): UTC+2 (CEST)

Branešci Donji (Serbian Cyrillic: Бранешци Доњи) is a village in the municipality of Čelinac, Republika Srpska, Bosnia and Herzegovina.
