= List of mammals of Bosnia and Herzegovina =

There are 59 mammal species in Bosnia and Herzegovina. This list is derived from the IUCN Red List which lists species of mammals and includes those mammals that have recently been classified as extinct (since 1500 AD).

Icons which state each species' global IUCN status:
CR	Critically Endangered	In imminent risk of extinction in the wild
VU	Vulnerable	Facing a high risk of extinction in the wild
NT	Near Threatened	Doesn't meet any criteria that would categorise it as risking extinction but likely to in the future
LC	Least Concern	No current identifiable risks to this species

== Order: Rodentia (rodents) ==
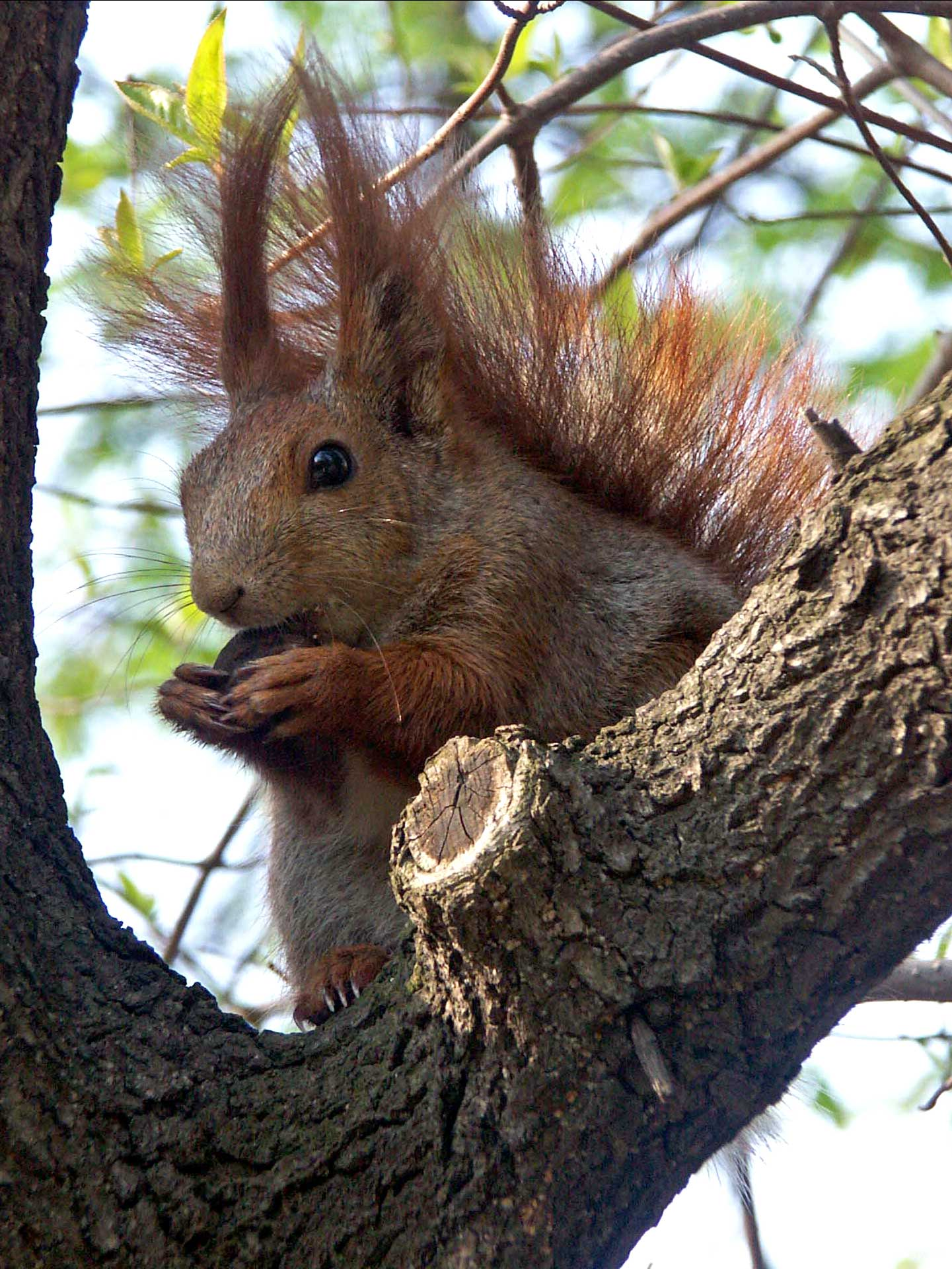
Red squirrel

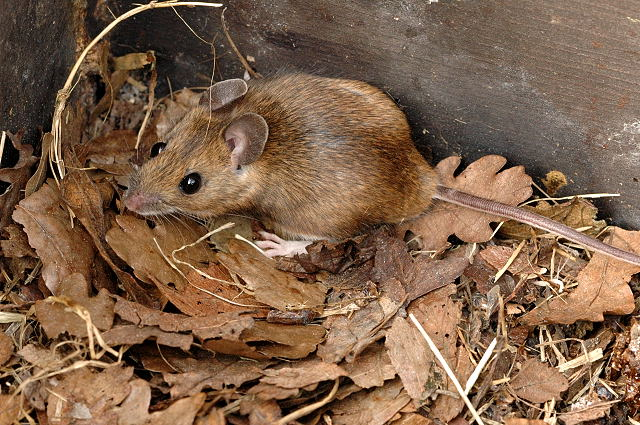
Yellow-necked mouse

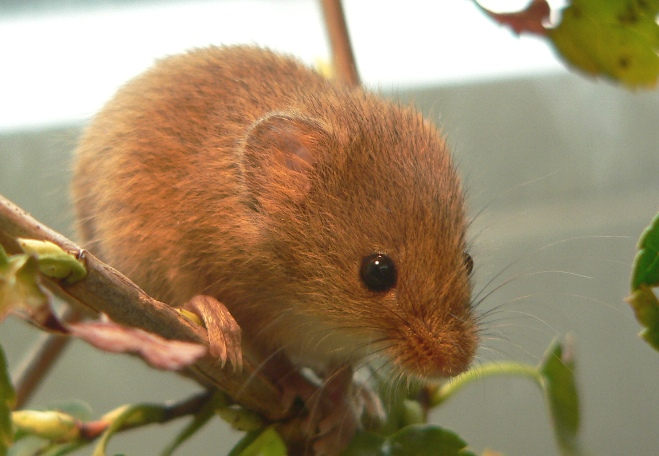
Harvest mouse

Rodents make up the largest order of mammals, with over 40% of mammalian species. They have two incisors in the upper and lower jaw which grow continually and must be kept short by gnawing. Most rodents are small though the capybara can weigh up to 45 kg (100 lb).

- Suborder: Sciurognathi
  - Family: Sciuridae (squirrels)
    - Subfamily: Sciurinae
      - Tribe: Sciurini
        - Genus: Sciurus
          - Red squirrel, Sciurus vulgaris LC
    - Subfamily: Xerinae
      - Tribe: Marmotini
        - Genus: Marmota
          - Alpine marmot, Marmota marmota LC
  - Family: Gliridae (dormice)
    - Subfamily: Leithiinae
      - Genus: Dryomys
        - Forest dormouse, Dryomys nitedula LC
      - Genus: Eliomys
        - Garden dormouse, Eliomys quercinus NT
      - Genus: Muscardinus
        - Hazel dormouse, Muscardinus avellanarius LC
    - Subfamily: Glirinae
      - Genus: Glis
        - European edible dormouse Glis glis LC
  - Family: Spalacidae
    - Subfamily: Spalacinae
      - Genus: Nannospalax
        - Lesser mole rat, Nannospalax leucodon LC
  - Family: Cricetidae
    - Subfamily: Arvicolinae
      - Genus: Arvicola
        - Water vole, Arvicola terrestris LC
      - Genus: Chionomys
        - Snow vole, Chionomys nivalis LC
      - Genus: Clethrionomys
        - Bank vole, Clethrionomys glareolus LC
      - Genus: Cricetus
        - European hamster, C. cricetus CR presence uncertain
      - Genus: Dinaromys
        - Balkan snow vole, Dinaromys bogdanovi VU
      - Genus: Microtus
        - Field vole, Microtus agrestis LC
        - Common vole, Microtus arvalis LC
        - European pine vole, Microtus subterraneus LC
        - Thomas's pine vole, Microtus thomasi LC
  - Family: Muridae (mice, rats, voles, gerbils, hamsters, etc.)
    - Subfamily: Murinae
      - Genus: Apodemus
        - Striped field mouse, Apodemus agrarius LC
        - Yellow-necked mouse, Apodemus flavicollis LC
        - Broad-toothed field mouse, Apodemus mystacinus LC
        - Wood mouse, Apodemus sylvaticus LC
      - Genus: Micromys
        - Harvest mouse, Micromys minutus LC
      - Genus: Mus
        - Steppe mouse, Mus spicilegus LC
  - Family: Castoridae (beavers)
    - Genus: Castor
      - Eurasian beaver, C. fiber LC

== Order: Lagomorpha (lagomorphs) ==
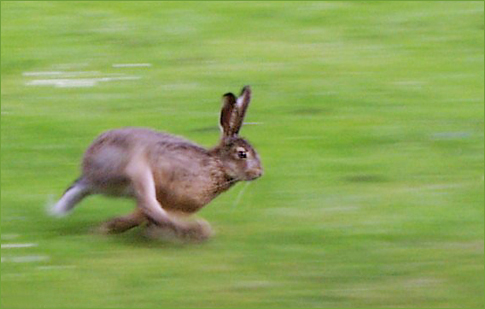
European hare

The lagomorphs comprise two families, Leporidae (hares and rabbits), and Ochotonidae (pikas). Though they can resemble rodents, and were classified as a superfamily in that order until the early 20th century, they have since been considered a separate order. They differ from rodents in a number of physical characteristics, such as having four incisors in the upper jaw rather than two.

- Family: Leporidae (rabbits, hares)
  - Genus: Lepus
    - European hare, L. europaeus LC

== Order: Eulipotyphla (hedgehogs, shrews and moles) ==
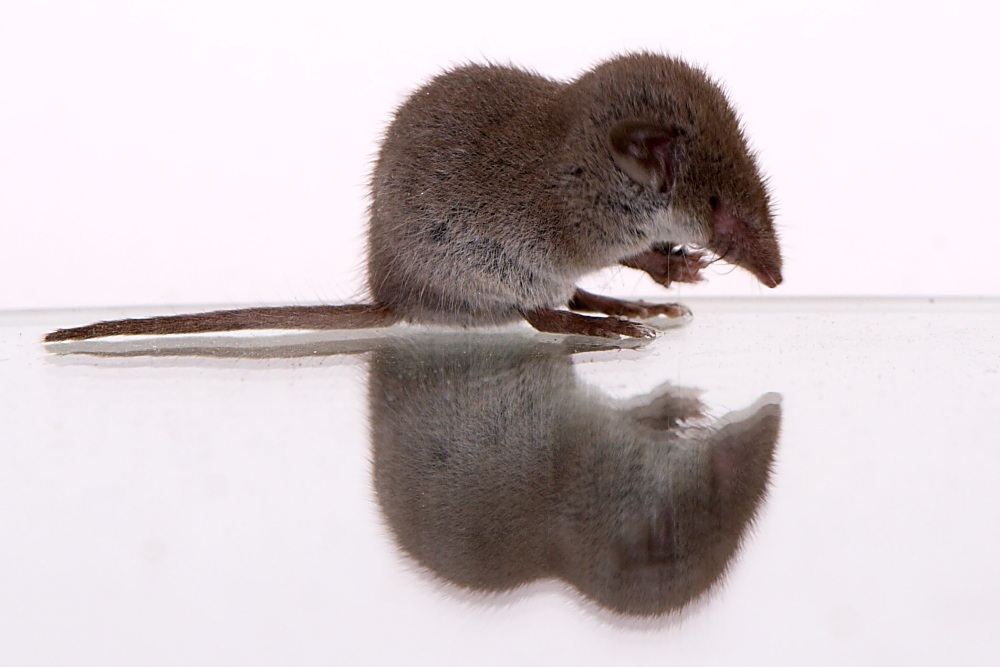
Lesser white-toothed shrew

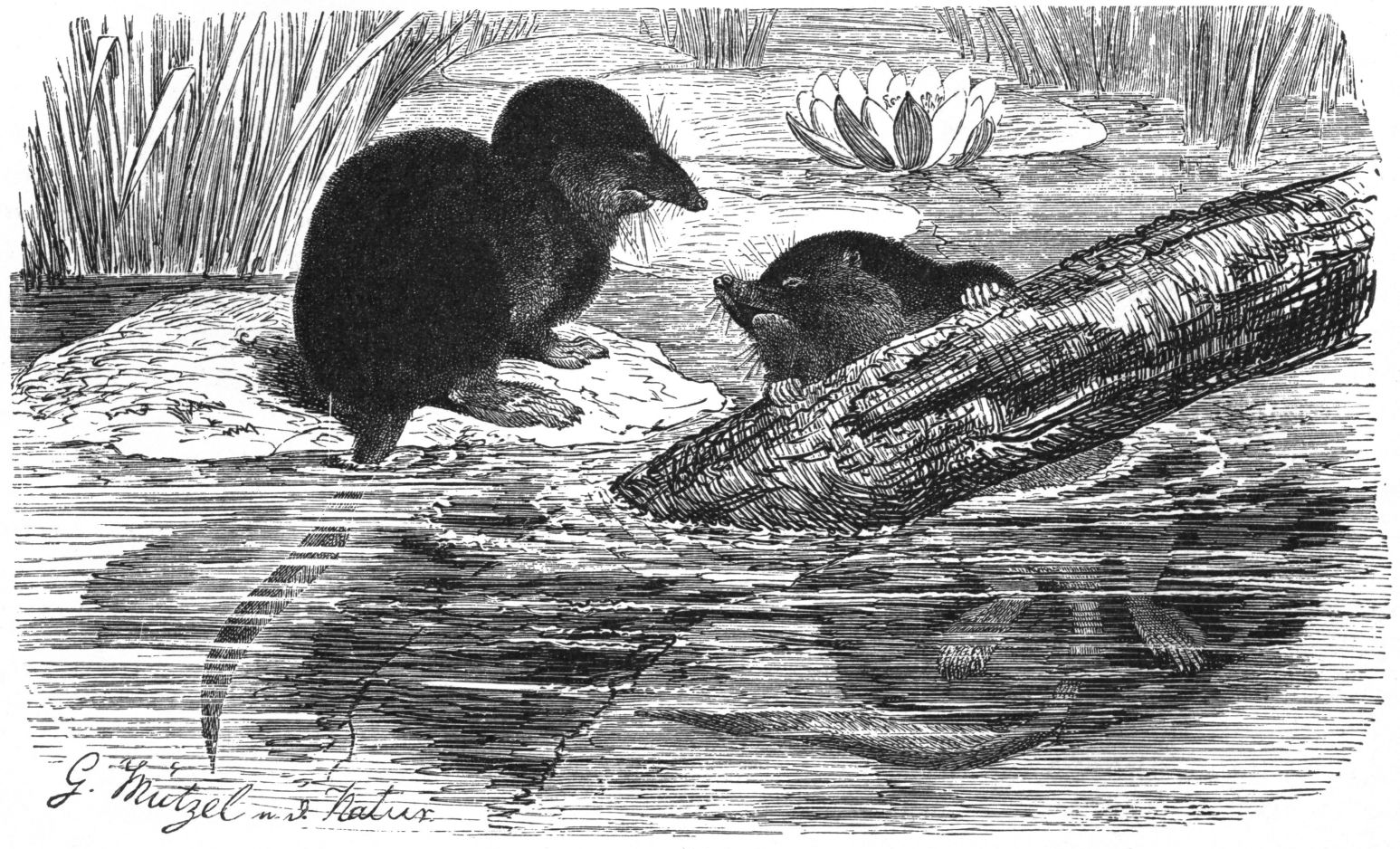
Eurasian water shrew

Hedgehogs are easily recognised by their spines, shrews closely resemble mice, and moles are stout-bodied burrowers.

- Family: Soricidae (shrews)
  - Subfamily: Crocidurinae
    - Genus: Crocidura
      - Bicolored shrew, C. leucodon LC
      - Lesser white-toothed shrew, C. suaveolens LC
  - Subfamily: Soricinae
    - Tribe: Nectogalini
      - Genus: Neomys
        - Southern water shrew, N. anomalus LC
        - Eurasian water shrew, N. fodiens LC
    - Tribe: Soricini
      - Genus: Sorex
        - Alpine shrew, S. alpinus NT
        - Common shrew, S. araneus LC

== Order: Chiroptera (bats) ==
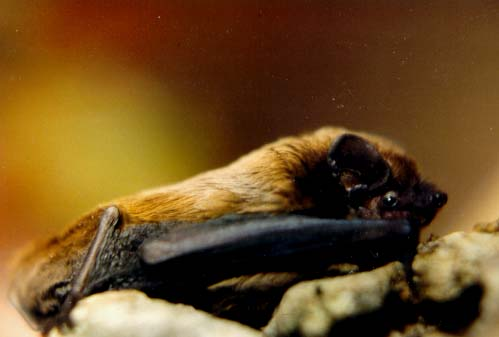
Lesser noctule

The bats' most distinguishing feature is that their forelimbs are developed as wings, making them the only mammals capable of flight. Bat species account for about 20% of all mammals.

- Family: Vespertilionidae
  - Subfamily: Myotinae
    - Genus: Myotis
      - Bechstein's bat, M. bechsteini NT
      - Long-fingered bat, M. capaccinii VU
      - Pond bat, M. dasycneme NT
      - Geoffroy's bat, M. emarginatus LC
  - Subfamily: Vespertilioninae
    - Genus: Barbastella
      - Western barbastelle, B. barbastellus NT
    - Genus: Nyctalus
      - Greater noctule bat, N. lasiopterus VU
      - Lesser noctule, N. leisleri LC
    - Genus: Pipistrellus
      - Common pipistrelle, Pipistrellus pipistrellus LC
    - Genus: Plecotus
      - Brown long-eared bat, P. auritus LC
      - Alpine long-eared bat, P. macrobullaris NT
  - Subfamily: Miniopterinae
    - Genus: Miniopterus
      - Common bent-wing bat, M. schreibersii VU
- Family: Rhinolophidae
  - Subfamily: Rhinolophinae
    - Genus: Rhinolophus
      - Blasius's horseshoe bat, R. blasii LC
      - Mediterranean horseshoe bat, R. euryale NT
      - Greater horseshoe bat, R. ferrumequinum LC
      - Lesser horseshoe bat, R. hipposideros LC
      - Mehely's horseshoe bat, R. mehelyi VU

== Order: Cetacea (whales) ==
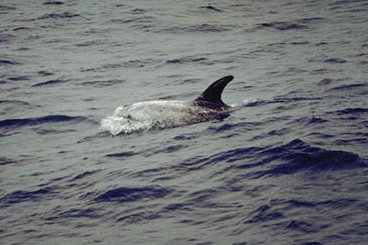
Risso's dolphin

The order Cetacea includes whales, dolphins and porpoises. They are the mammals most fully adapted to aquatic life with a spindle-shaped nearly hairless body, protected by a thick layer of blubber, and forelimbs and tail modified to provide propulsion underwater.

- Suborder: Odontoceti
  - Superfamily: Platanistoidea
    - Family: Delphinidae (marine dolphins)
      - Genus: Delphinus
        - Short-beaked common dolphin, D. delphis LC
      - Genus: Grampus
        - Risso's dolphin, G. griseus LC

== Order: Carnivora (carnivorans) ==
European jackal, Canis aureus moreotica, a subspecies of golden jackal

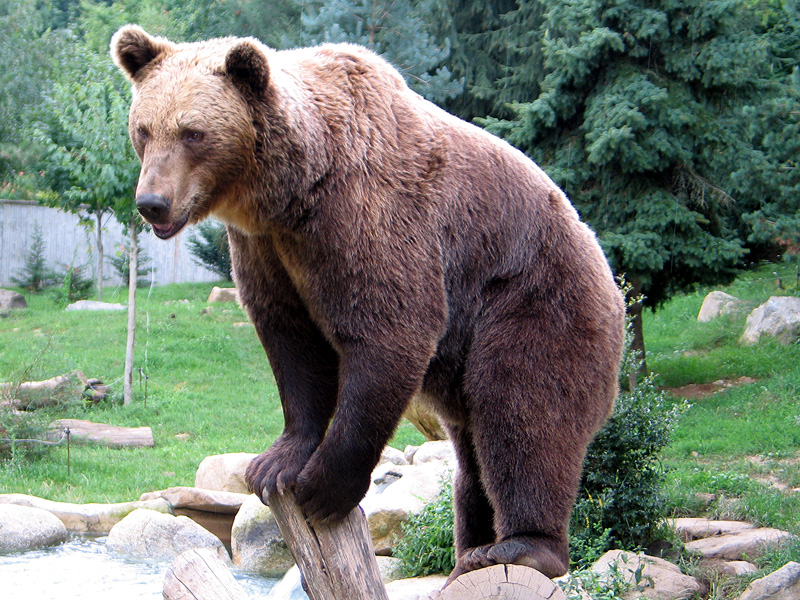
Brown bear

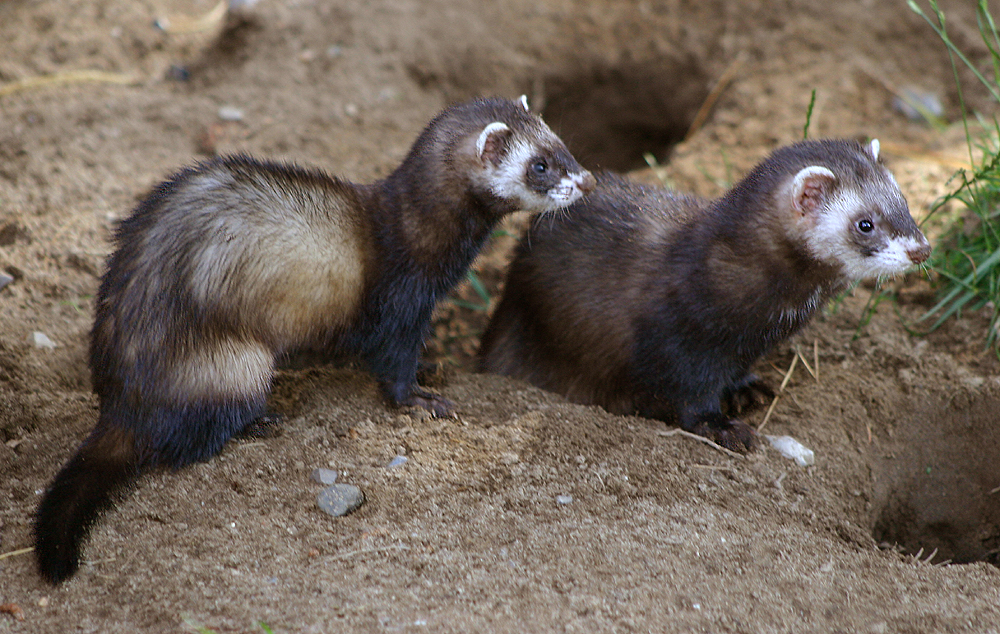
European polecat

There are over 260 species of carnivorans, the majority of which feed primarily on meat. They have a characteristic skull shape and dentition.

- Suborder: Feliformia
  - Family: Felidae (cats)
    - Subfamily: Felinae
      - Genus: Felis
        - European wildcat, F. silvestris LC
  - Family: Herpestidae
    - Genus: Urva
      - Small Indian mongoose, U. auropunctata LC introduced
- Suborder: Caniformia
  - Family: Canidae (dogs, foxes)
    - Genus: Canis
      - Golden jackal, C. aureus LC
        - European jackal, C. a. moreoticus
      - Gray wolf, C. lupus LC
        - Eurasian wolf, C. l. lupus
    - Genus: Vulpes
      - Red fox, V. vulpes LC
  - Family: Ursidae (bears)
    - Genus: Ursus
      - Brown bear, U. arctos LC
        - Eurasian brown bear, U. a. arctos
  - Family: Mustelidae (mustelids)
    - Genus: Lutra
      - European otter, L. lutra NT
    - Genus: Martes
      - Beech marten, M. foina LC
    - Genus: Meles
      - European badger, M. meles LC
    - Genus: Mustela
      - Stoat, M. erminea LC
      - Least weasel, M. nivalis LC
      - European polecat, M. putorius LC
  - Family: Phocidae (earless seals)
    - Genus: Monachus
      - Mediterranean monk seal, M. monachus VU extirpated

== Order: Artiodactyla (even-toed ungulates) ==
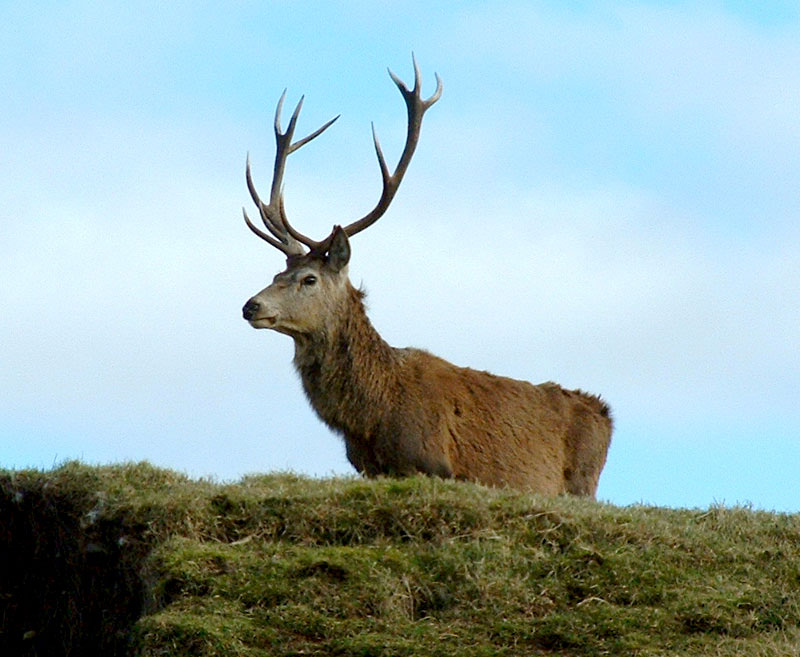
Red deer

The even-toed ungulates are ungulates whose weight is borne about equally by the third and fourth toes, rather than mostly or entirely by the third as in perissodactyls. There are about 220 artiodactyl species, including many that are of great economic importance to humans.

- Family: Suidae (pigs)
  - Subfamily: Suinae
    - Genus: Sus
      - Wild boar, S. scrofa LC
- Family: Cervidae (deer)
  - Subfamily: Cervinae
    - Genus: Cervus
      - Red deer, C. elaphus LC
    - Genus: Dama
      - European fallow deer, D. dama LC
  - Subfamily: Capreolinae
    - Genus: Capreolus
      - Roe deer, C. capreolus LC

== See also ==
- List of chordate orders
- Lists of mammals by region
- List of prehistoric mammals
- Mammal classification
- List of mammals described in the 2000s
