= Šahinovići (Čelinac) =

Šahinovići Шахиновићи
- Village
- Location within Bosnia and Herzegovina
- Coordinates: 44°39′16″N 17°14′38″E
- Country: Bosnia and Herzegovina
- Entity: Republika Srpska
- Municipality: Čelinac
- Time zone: UTC+1 (CET)
  - Summer (DST): UTC+2 (CEST)

Šahinovići (Serbian Cyrillic: Шахиновићи) is a village in the municipality of Čelinac, Republika Srpska, Bosnia and Herzegovina.
