= Memići (Čelinac) =

Memići Мемићи
- Village
- Location within Bosnia and Herzegovina
- Coordinates: 44°39′43″N 17°14′10″E
- Country: Bosnia and Herzegovina
- Entity: Republika Srpska
- Municipality: Čelinac
- Time zone: UTC+1 (CET)
  - Summer (DST): UTC+2 (CEST)

Memići (Cyrillic: Мемићи) is a village in the municipality of Čelinac, Republika Srpska, Bosnia and Herzegovina.
