= Jošavka (river) =

- Location within Bosnia and Herzegovina
- Native name: Јошавка (Serbian)

Location
- Country: Bosnia and Herzegovina

Physical characteristics
- Source
  - location: Tromeđa (Uzlomac)
  - elevation: 345 m (1,132 ft)
- Mouth: Vrbanja
  - location: Čelinac
  - coordinates: 44.7296°N 17.3127°E
- Length: 20 km (12 mi)

Basin features
- Progression: Vrbanja→ Vrbas→ Sava→ Danube→ Black Sea

Jošavka is the right and one of the largest tributaries of the Vrbanja, which it joins in Čelinac. It arises from two streams: Ćetina and Babića potok rising on the northeast slopes of the hill Tromeđa (404 m) in the foothills of the mountain massif of Uzlomac (1,002 m). The right tributaris of Jošavka river are: Stanikova rijeka, Mlinska rijeka (Mill River), Jelovaca, Mliješnica and Gozna and the left ones are: Jevđevića potok (Jevđevići's stream), the second comprises Prlišnica and Crna rijeka (Black river), and follow Baserovača, Repušnica, and Balatin.

Due to the unregulated riverbed and increased influence of anthropogenic factors, in the first decades of the 21st century is increasingly pours and makes enormous material damage, and applies to people's lives.

From Čelinca, upstream, mostly valleys Jošavka passing traffic corridor in which the railroad Banja Luka - Doboj - Sarajevo - Ploče and local roads (over the populated place Ukrina, downriver Ukrina) in Doboj.

== See also ==
- Vrbanja (river)
- Čelinac
