= Čelinac =

Čelinac Челинац
- Town and municipality
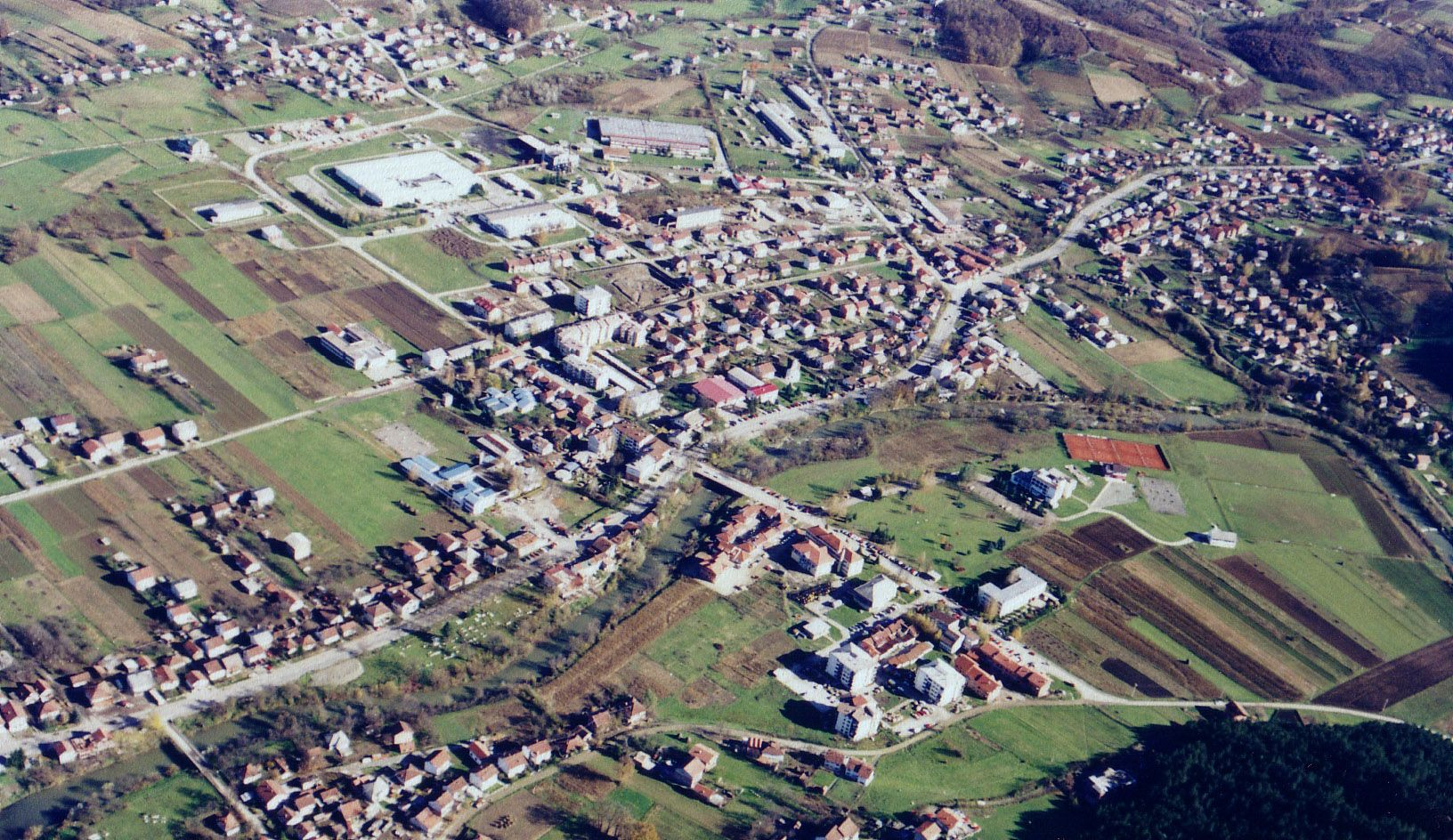
- View on Čelinac

- Flag Coat of arms

- Location of Čelinac within Bosnia and Herzegovina

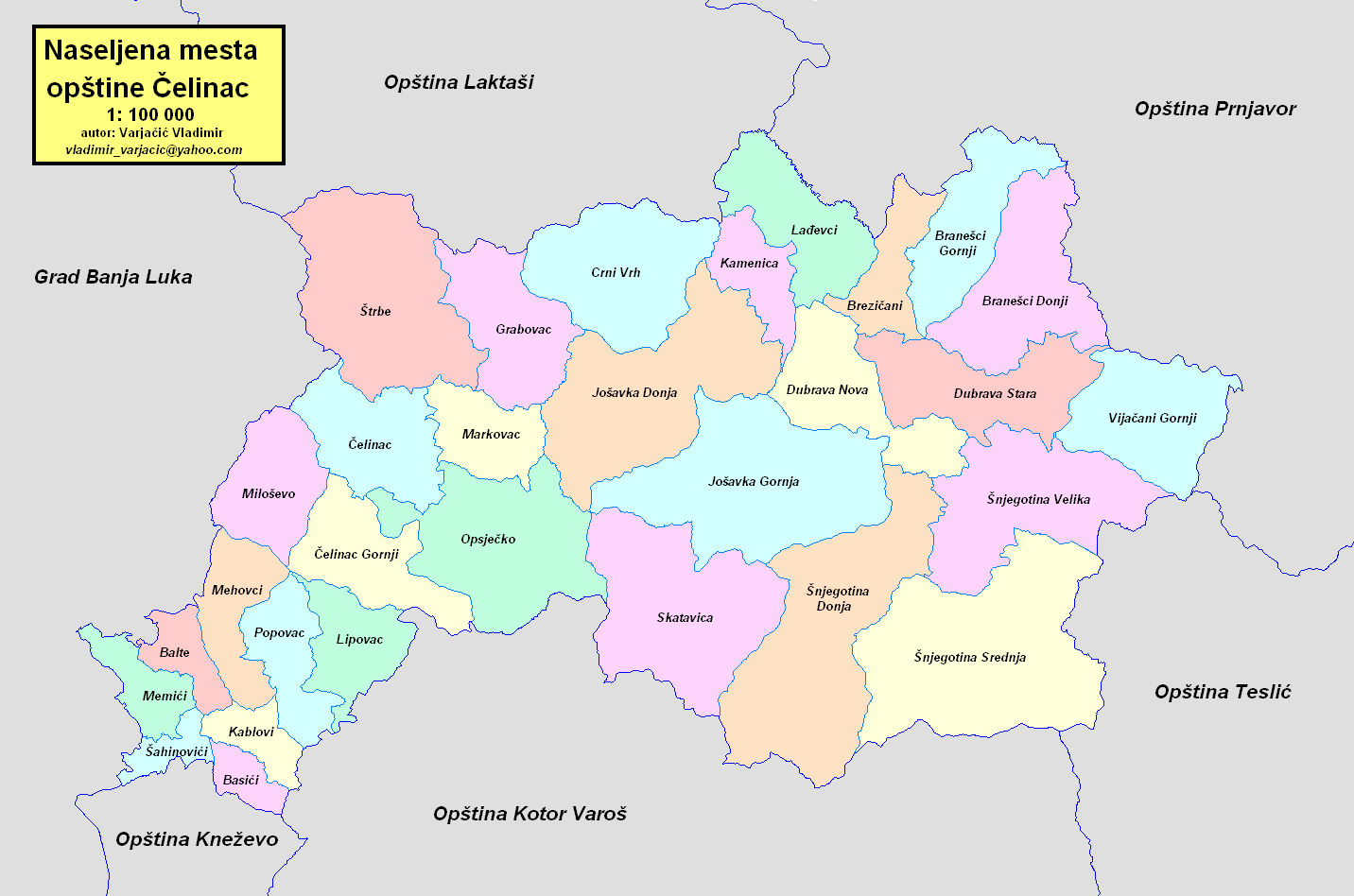
- Coordinates: 44°43′30″N 17°19′48″E
- Country: Bosnia and Herzegovina
- Entity: Republika Srpska

Government
  - Municipal mayor: Vlado Gligorić (SNSD)

Area
  - Total: 361.81 km^{2} (139.70 sq mi)

Population (2013 census)
  - Total: 15,548
  - Density: 42.973/km^{2} (111.30/sq mi)
- Time zone: UTC+1 (CET)
  - Summer (DST): UTC+2 (CEST)
- Area code: 051
- Website: www.opstina-celinac.com

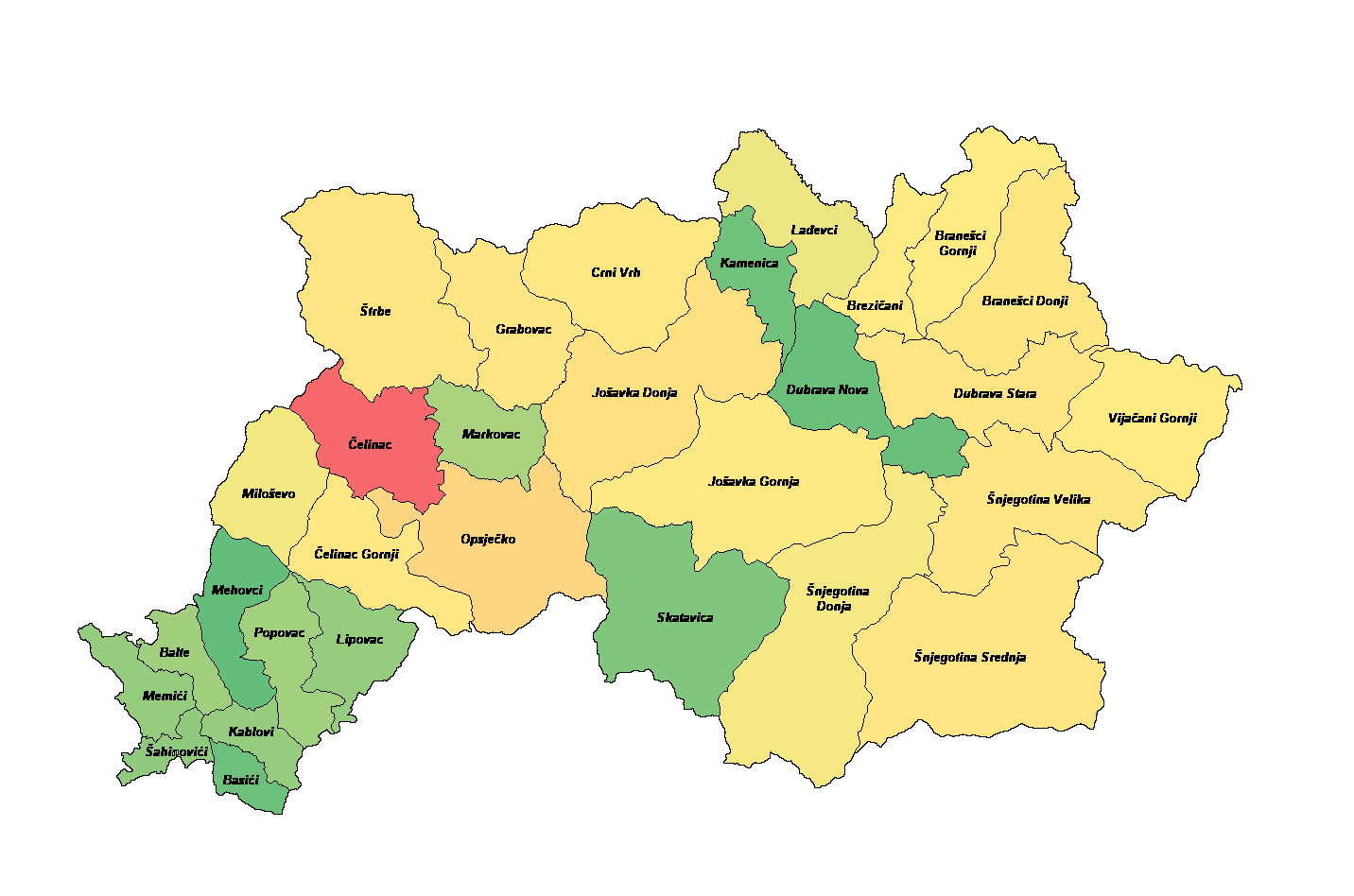
Čelinac municipality by population proportional to the settlement with the highest and lowest population

Čelinac (Serbian Cyrillic: Челинац) is a town and municipality in Republika Srpska, Bosnia and Herzegovina. As of 2013, the municipality has a population of 15,548 inhabitants, while the town of Čelinac has a population of 5,097 inhabitants.

== Geography ==
It is located along the Jošavka and Vrbanja rivers, between the municipalities of Laktaši and Prnjavor to the north, Teslić to the east, Kotor Varoš and Kneževo (formerly known as Skender Vakuf) to the south, and Banja Luka to the west.

== History ==
=== War in Yugoslavia ===
The main initiator and leader of the persecution of the non-Serb population in the valley of the Vrbanja river and Bosanska Krajina, including Čelinac, was a member of the SDS — Radoslav Brđanin, a native of the nearby village of Popovac.

Brđanin was a leading political figure in the Autonomous Region of Krajina (ARK). During The war in Bosnia and Herzegovina in the 1990s, he was in key positions at the municipal, regional and "republic" level. Among other things, he was the first vice president of the Assembly of the ARK, president of the ARK Crisis Staff and later as acting vice minister of production, minister of construction, traffic and utilities and acting deputy prime minister of Republika Srpska (RS). The International Criminal Tribunal for the former Yugoslavia (ICTY) condemned him for various crimes to 30 years in prison.

During the War in Bosnia, along with other generally known reprisals, the local authorities had introduced restrictions for Bosniaks and Croats, i.e. the non-Serb population. In addition to those who had experienced this, among other things, bears witness to the indictment against Radovan Karadžić before the Tribunal in The Hague. At the hearing in 2013, a witness, in response to Nikola Poplašen, stated:

"Since he stated that there was no ethnic discrimination in the Republika Srpska, the prosecutor presented the decision of the Čelinac municipality authorities from July 23, 1992, in which Croats and Muslims are prohibited from going out into the street from 4 p.m. till 6 a.m., bathing in the river, fishing, gathering in larger groups, and the only thing they are expressly allowed to do is - leave. And this only on the condition that the entire household leaves the municipality. According to Poplašen, with these restrictions, the municipal authorities wanted to "protect" the population and "save people's heads".

== Settlements ==
Aside from the town of Čelinac, the municipality includes the following settlements:

- Balte
- Basići
- Branešci Donji
- Branešci Gornji
- Brezičani
- Crni Vrh
- Čelinac Gornji
- Dubrava Nova
- Dubrava Stara
- Grabovac
- Jošavka Donja
- Jošavka Gornja
- Kablovi
- Kamenica
- Lađevci
- Lipovac
- Markovac
- Mehovci
- Memići
- Miloševo
- Opsječko
- Popovac
- Skatavica
- Šahinovići
- Šnjegotina Donja
- Šnjegotina Srednja
- Šnjegotina Velika
- Štrbe
- Vijačani Gornji

== Demographics ==
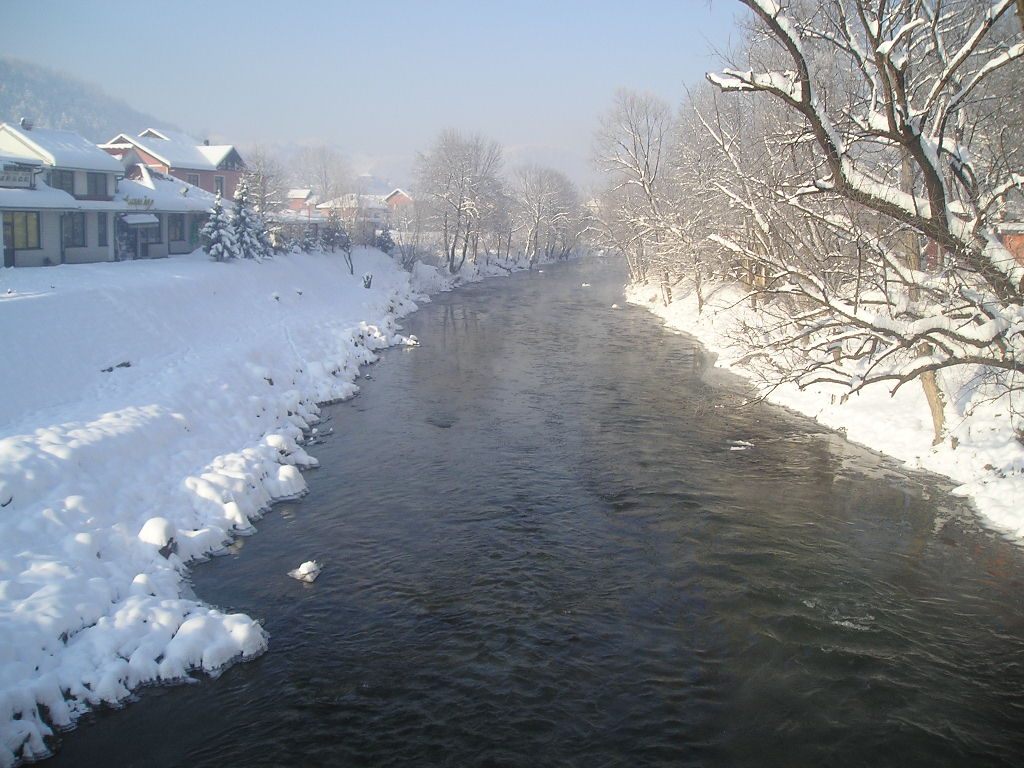
TheVrbanja river

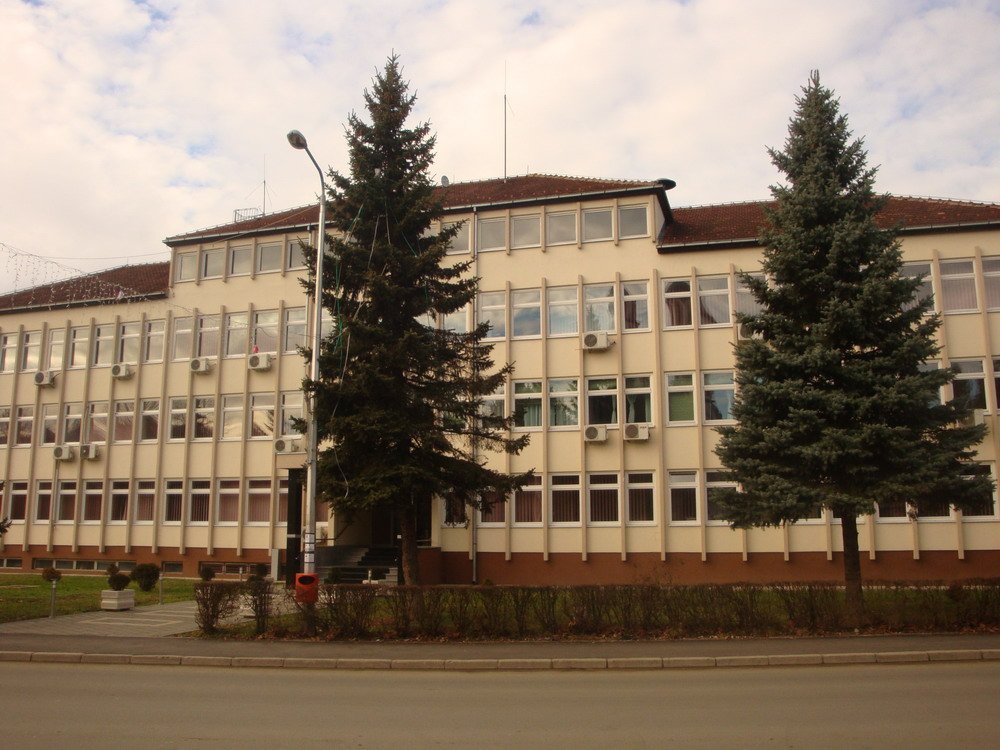
The town assembly

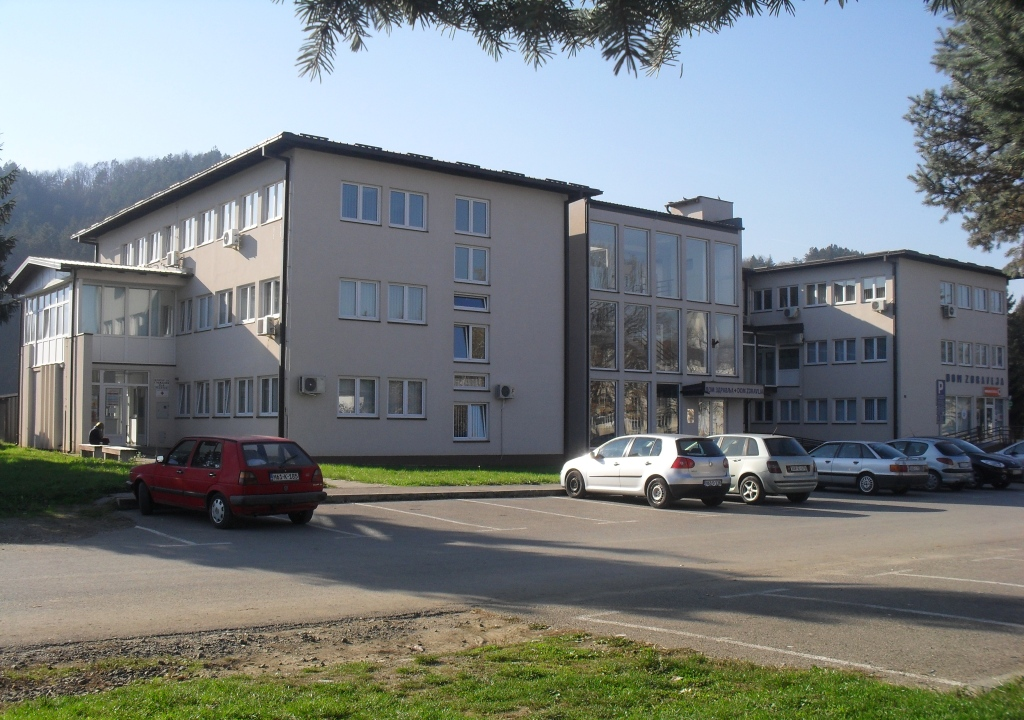
The Community Health centre

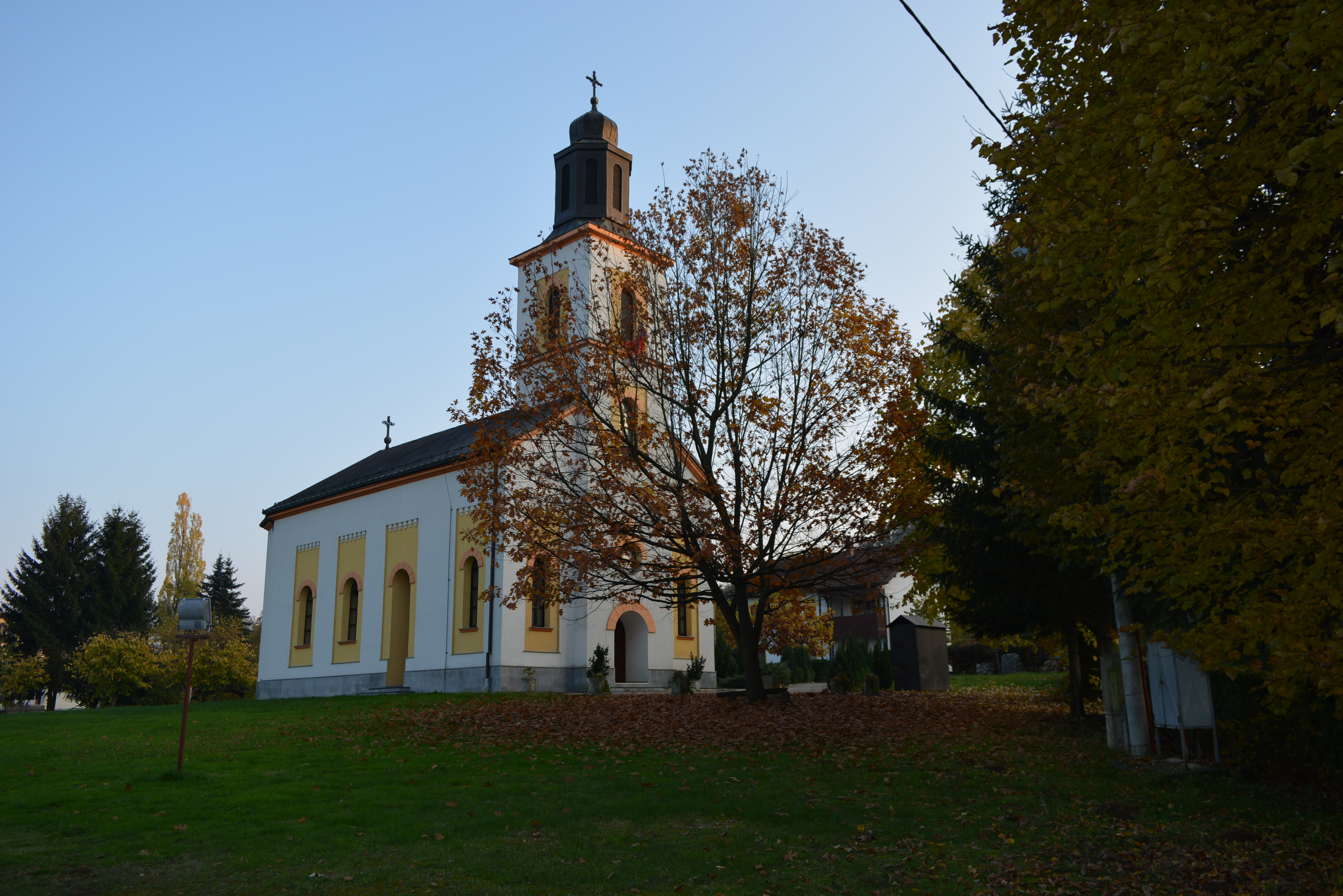
A Church in Jošavka Donja

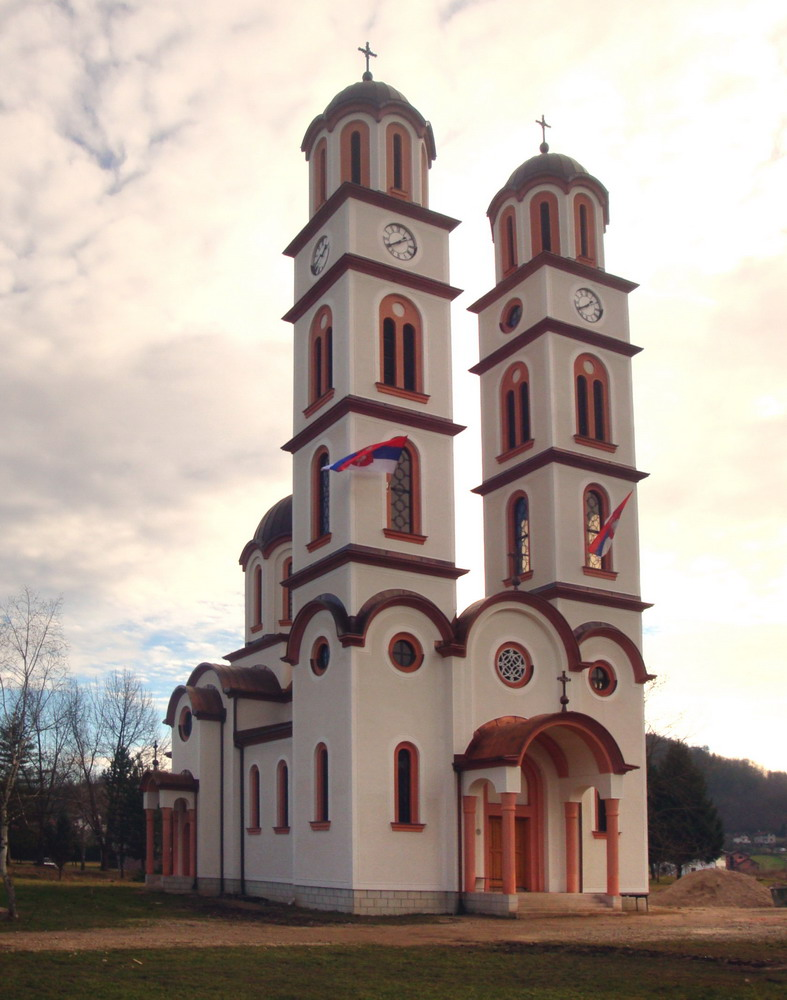
The Serbian Orthodox Church of St. Archangel Gabriel

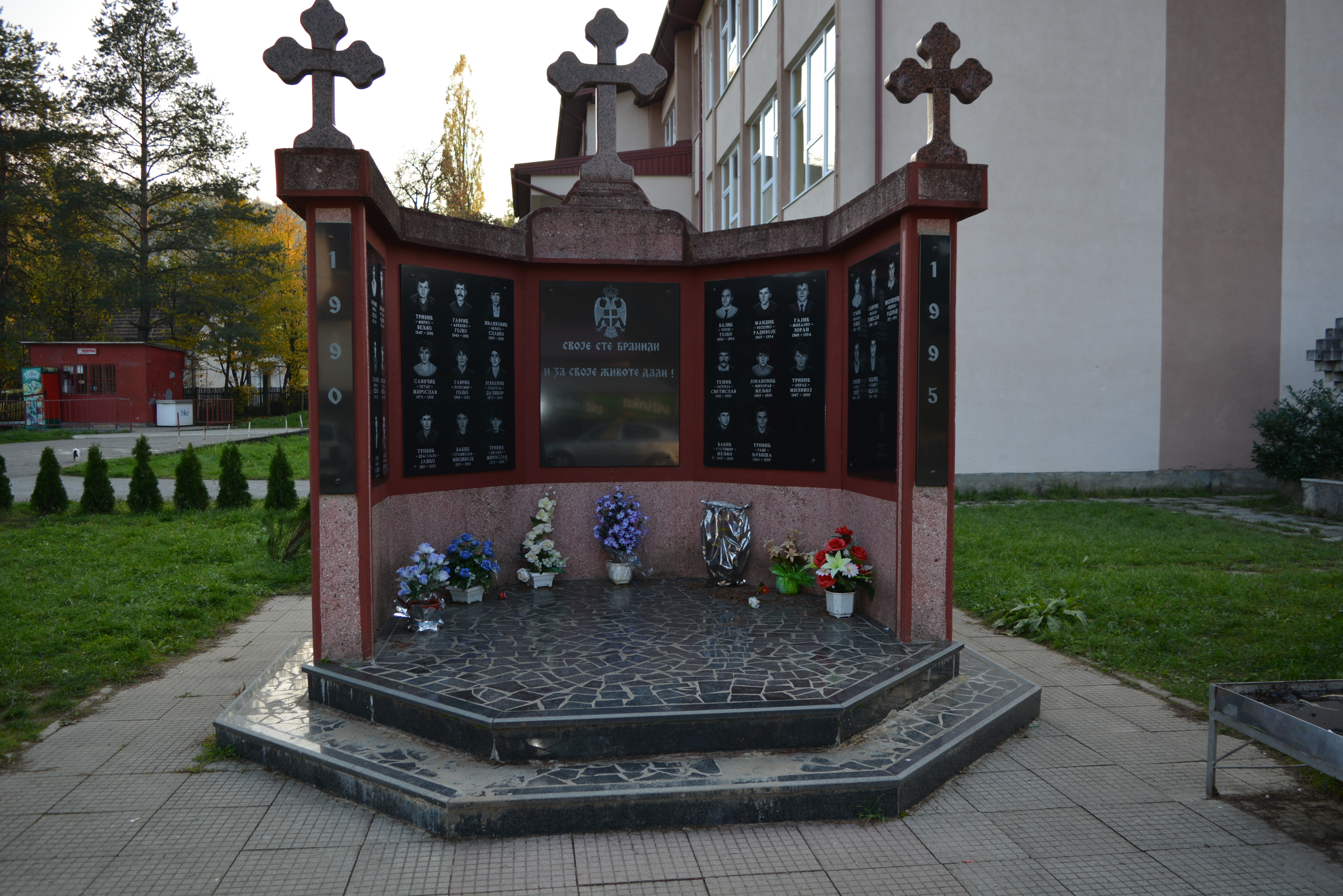
Monument dedicated to the fighters of Republika Srpska

=== Population ===
Population of settlements – Čelinac municipality
	Settlement	1971.	1981.	1991.	2013.
	Total	17,430	18,354	18,713	15,117
1	Balte			234	141
2	Basići			237	27
3	Branešci Gornji			645	375
4	Branešci Donji			779	555
5	Brezičani			517	393
6	Vijačani Gornji			544	362
7	Grabovac			648	568
8	Dubrava Nova			13	24
9	Dubrava Stara			771	614
10	Jošavka Gornja			563	441
11	Jošavlka Donja			957	746
12	Kablovi			294	118
13	Kamenica			28	38
14	Lađevci			527	303
15	Lipovac			308	119
16	Markovac			167	161
17	Memići			218	118
18	Mehovci			266	7
19	Miloševo			359	322
20	Opsječko			950	1,180
21	Popovac			306	144
22	Skatavica			149	70
23	Crni Vrh			756	520
24	Čelinac	1,321	3,136	4,857	5,097
25	Čelinac Gornji			513	514
26	Šahinovići			170	104
27	Šnjegotina Velika			836	534
28	Šnjegotina Donja			572	326
29	Šnjegotina Srednja			922	583
30	Štrbe			605	613

=== Ethnic composition ===
Ethnic composition – Čelinac town
Nationality	2013.	1991.	1981.	1971.
Total	5.097 (100%)	4.857 (100%)	3.136 (100%)	1.321 (100%)
Serbs		3.450 (71,0%)	1.798 (57,3%)	569 (43,1%)
Bosniaks		1.005 (20,7%)	817 (26,1%)	694 (52,5%)
Croats		51 (1,1%)	57 (1,8%)	32 (2,4%)
Yugoslavs		234 (4,8%)	402 (12,8%)	7 (0,5%)
Others		117 (2,4%)	62 (2,0%)	19 (1,4%)

Ethnic composition – Čelinac municipality
Nationality	2013.	1991.	1981.	1971.
Total	15.117 (100%)	18.713 (100%)	18.354 (100%)	17.430 (100%)
Serbs	14.508 (96,0%)	16.554 (88,5%)	15.832 (86,3%)	15.880 (91,1%)
Bosniaks	395 (2,6%)	1.446 (7,7%)	1.232 (6,7%)	1.209 (6,9%)
Croats	48 (0,3%)	76 (0,4%)	86 (0,5%)	90 (0,5%)
Yugoslavs		377 (2,0%)	885 (4,8%)	14 (0,1%)
Others	166 (1,1%)	260 (1,4%)	319 (1,7%)	237 (1,4%)

== Economy ==
The following table gives a preview of the total number of registered employed people per their core activity (as of 2016):

Professional field	Total
Agriculture, forestry and fishing	94
Mining and quarrying	-
Manufacturing	1,123
Distribution of power, gas, steam and air-conditioning	49
Distribution of water and water waste management	25
Construction	85
Wholesale and retail, repair	534
Transportation and storage	175
Hotels and restaurants	105
Information and communication	12
Finance and insurance	18
Real estate activities	2
Professional, scientific and technical activities	43
Administrative and support services	76
Public administration and defence	132
Education	253
Healthcare and social work	91
Art, entertainment and recreation	12
Other service activities	42
Total	2,871

== See also ==
- Municipalities of Republika Srpska

== Notable people ==
- Radoslav Brđanin, politician
- Rajko Kuzmanović, politician
- Željko Blagojević, ultra runner
