= Radio Mango (Livno) =

Bosnian radio station

Livno; Bosnia and Herzegovina
- Broadcast area: Canton 10
- Frequencies: Livno 93.3 MHz; Livno 97.6 MHz
- RDS: MANGO

Programming
- Language: Croatian

Ownership
- Owner: MANGO d.o.o. Livno

History
- First air date: November 3, 2020; August 10, 1998
- Former names: Radio Studio N

Technical information
- Licensing authority: CRA BiH
- Transmitter coordinates: 43°49′31″N 17°00′21″E
- Repeaters: Ivovik/Borova glava Livno/PTC Forum-Splitska ul. BB

Links
- Webcast: Listen Live
- Website: www.radiomango.eu

Radio Mango is a Bosnian local commercial radio station, broadcasting from Livno, Bosnia and Herzegovina. Radio station was founded on 10 August 1998 as Radio Studio N. Since 3 November 2020, radio station is using current name.

This radio station broadcasts a variety of programs such as music, talk show and local news. The owner of the radio station is the company MANGO d.o.o. Livno

Program is mainly produced in Croatian at two FM frequencies and it is available in the city of Livno and in Canton 10, parts of West Herzegovina Canton and in neighboring Croatia.

Estimated number of listeners of Radio Mango is around 33,071.

== Frequencies ==
- Livno 93.3 MHz
- Livno 97.6 MHz

== See also ==
- List of radio stations in Bosnia and Herzegovina
- Radio Livno
- Radio Drvar
- Radio Tomislavgrad
- Radio Posušje
- Radio postaja Široki Brijeg
- RGM
