= Radio Vikom =

Bosnian radio station

Gradiška; Bosnia and Herzegovina
- Broadcast area: Gradiška, Bosnia and Herzegovina
- Frequency: Kotor Varoš 91.1 MHz

Programming
- Language: Serbian language
- Format: Local news, talk and music

Ownership
- Owner: "VIKOM RTV" d.o.o., Gradiška na Savi

History
- Founded: March 10, 1997

Technical information
- Licensing authority: CRA BiH
- Transmitter coordinates: 45°08′45″N 17°15′14″E
- Repeater: Kotor Varoš/Lipovac

Links
- Website: www.vikom.tv

Radio Vikom is a Bosnian local commercial radio station, broadcasting from Gradiška, Bosnia and Herzegovina.

This radio station broadcasts folk or turbo-folk music and local news. The owner of the radio station is the company "VIKOM RTV" d.o.o., Gradiška na Savi which also operates RTV Vikom.

Program is mainly produced in Serbian language at one FM frequency (Kotor Varoš 91.1 MHz) and it is available in the city of Banja Luka and Gradiška as well as in nearby municipalities.

Estimated number of listeners of Radio Vikom is around 244.183.

The founder and director of the radio is Vinko Perić.

According to a 2006 media report, Radio Vikom was fined by Communications Regulatory Agency of Bosnia and Herzegovina for unauthorized use of frequencies in the Tuzla region. Also, in 2012, the largest fine for hate speech of 20,000 KM (BAM) was imposed on RTV Vikom.

== Frequencies ==
- Kotor Varoš 91.1 MHz

== See also ==
- List of radio stations in Bosnia and Herzegovina
- Radio Gradiška
- Big Radio 3
- Radio Kozara
- PST Radio
- Plavi FM
- Radio UNO
- Radio Kontakt
