= Korona Radio 2 =

Bosnian radio station

Trebinje; Bosnia and Herzegovina
- Broadcast area: East Herzegovina
- Frequencies: Trebinje 97.1 MHz; Gacko 101.9 MHz
- RDS: KORONA-2; KORONA-3

Programming
- Language: Serbian language
- Format: Local news, talk and music

Ownership
- Owner: Korona d.o.o. Trebinje

History
- Founded: 2018

Technical information
- Licensing authority: CRA BiH
- Transmitter coordinates: 42°42′43″N 18°20′46″E
- Repeaters: Trebinje/Veliki Humac; Gacko/Jovanovo brdo

Links
- Website: www.koronaonline.com

Korona Radio 2 or Radio Korona 2 is a Bosnian local commercial radio station, broadcasting from Trebinje, Bosnia and Herzegovina. This radio station was launched in 2018 as the second program of Korona Radio 1 radio station.

The owner of the radio station is the company Korona d.o.o. Trebinje.

Korona Radio 2 broadcasts folk and popular regional music. Program is mainly produced in Serbian language at two FM frequencies and it is available in the city of Trebinje and Gacko as well as in nearby municipalities of East Herzegovina and in neighboring Montenegro and Croatia.

According to a media report from February 2020, Korona Radio 1 and Korona Radio 2 do not have a news program or any other radio program produced in their own studio, for which there are audio recordings in several time intervals during 2019 by examiners in charge of monitoring radio stations. The all-day program of this radio consists of music content and a small number of advertising jingles and advertisements, which deviates greatly from the practice of quality and listened radio stations.

Estimated number of listeners of Korona Radio 2 is around 47.603.

== Frequencies ==
- Trebinje 97.1 MHz
- Gacko 101.9 MHz

== See also ==
- List of radio stations in Bosnia and Herzegovina
- Korona Radio 1
- Radio Trebinje
- Radio Nevesinje
- Radio Bileća
- Radio gradska mreža - Mostarski radio
- Radio Padrino
