= Radio Džungla =

Bosnian radio station

Doboj; Bosnia and Herzegovina
- Broadcast area: Doboj area Zenica-Doboj Canton; Bosanska Posavina
- Frequencies: Kotor Varoš 92.0 MHz; Doboj 101.1 MHz; Doboj 103.6 MHz
- RDS: DZUNGLA

Programming
- Language: Serbian language

Ownership
- Sister stations: Radio Džungla 2 Radio Džungla 3

History
- First air date: December 22, 1997

Technical information
- Licensing authority: CRA BiH
- Transmitter coordinates: 44°43′53″N 18°05′04″E
- Repeaters: Kotor Varoš/Lipovac; Borja/Mala Runjavica; Doboj/Ciganište-Becanj

Links
- Webcast: Listen Live (1)
- Website: www.dzungla.net

Radio Džungla or Džungla Radio is a Bosnian group of commercial radio stations, broadcasting from Doboj, Bosnia and Herzegovina. It broadcasts a variety of programs such as news, music, morning and talk shows. A network of Radio Džungla radio stations is available on three FM frequencies in the Doboj and Banja Luka area, Zenica-Doboj Canton and parts of Bosanska Posavina and via two Internet radio stations.

== Radio stations ==
=== Radio Džungla 1 ===
Radio Džungla or I program was launched on 22 December 1997 by company Džungla d.o.o. Doboj and it is the most listened radio station in the Doboj region.

Estimated number of listeners of Radio Džungla is around 415.570. This radio station broadcasts current folk and turbo-folk music.

- Frequencies:
  - Kotor Varoš 92.0 MHz
  - Doboj 101.1 MHz
  - Doboj 103.6 MHz

=== Radio Džungla 2 ===
Radio Džungla 2 or II program is internet radio station (Listen live) dedicated to the greatest hits of domestic music (Balkan music) operated by Radio Džungla.

=== Radio Džungla 3 ===
Radio Džungla 3 or III program is internet radio station (Listen live) dedicated to the best foreign novelties, party / urban mix of music operated by Radio Džungla.

== See also ==
- List of radio stations in Bosnia and Herzegovina
- Radio Doboj
- K3 Radio Prnjavor
- Radio ZOS
- Big Radio
- Radio Glas Drine
