= Radio Kozara =

Bosnian radio station

- Gradiška; Bosnia and Herzegovina
- Broadcast area: Gradiška
- Frequencies: Gradiška 89.9 MHz; Banja Luka 107.1 MHz
- RDS: *KOZARA*

Programming
- Language: Serbian
- Format: Local news, talk and music

Ownership
- Owner: GRUBEX RD d.o.o. Gradiška

History
- Founded: July 17, 2017

Technical information
- Licensing authority: CRA BiH
- Transmitter coordinates: 45°08′45″N 17°15′14″E
- Repeaters: Kozara/Gig; Banja Luka/Šibovi

Links
- Website: www.grubexrd.com

Radio Kozara is a Bosnian local commercial radio station, broadcasting from Gradiška, Bosnia and Herzegovina. Radio station was launched on 17 July 2017.

This radio station broadcasts a variety of programs such as music and local news. The owner of the radio station is the company GRUBEX RD d.o.o. Gradiška.

After BHRT has abandoned the launch of the BH Radio 2 program, reserved frequencies were allocated to other interested stations across Bosnia and Herzegovina through the competition where company GRUBEX RD d.o.o. Gradiška met the criteria and it received an additional FM frequency and increased their coverage.

The program is mainly produced in Serbian at two FM frequencies and it is available in the city of Gradiška and Banja Luka as well as in nearby municipalities in Croatia.

Estimated number of listeners of Radio Kozara is around 93,357.

== Frequencies ==
- Gradiška 89.9 MHz
- Banja Luka 107.1 MHz

== See also ==
- List of radio stations in Bosnia and Herzegovina
- Radio Gradiška
- Big Radio 1
- BH Radio 1
- Hard Rock Radio
- Plavi FM
- Radio UNO
