= Radio Studio M =

Bosnian radio station

Teslić; Bosnia and Herzegovina
- Broadcast area: Teslić
- Frequencies: Doboj 93.0 MHz; Banja Luka 100.7 MHz
- RDS: STUDIO M

Programming
- Language: Serbian language
- Format: Local news, talk and music

Ownership
- Owner: “MOMČILOVIĆ – STUDIO M” d.o.o. Teslić

History
- Founded: June 1998

Technical information
- Licensing authority: CRA BiH
- Transmitter coordinates: 44°36′24″N 17°51′36″E
- Repeaters: Borja/Mala Runjavica; Kotor Varoš/Lipovac

Links
- Webcast: Listen Live
- Website: www.studiomteslic.net

Radio Studio M or Radio Studio M Teslić is a Bosnian local commercial radio station, broadcasting from Teslić, Bosnia and Herzegovina. This radio station broadcasts a variety of programs such as music and local news.

Radio Studio M was founded in June 1998. Program is mainly produced in Serbian language at two FM frequencies and it is available in the city of Teslić as well as in nearby municipalities in Banja Luka and Doboj area. The owner of the radio station is the company Momčilović-Studio M d.o.o. Teslić.

Estimated number of listeners of Radio Studio M is around 219.280.

== Frequencies ==
- Doboj 93.0 MHz
- Banja Luka 100.7 MHz

== See also ==
- List of radio stations in Bosnia and Herzegovina
- Radio M
- Radio Doboj
- Radio Zenica
- PST radio
- K3 Radio Prnjavor
