= Radio Unsko-sanskog kantona =

Bosnian radio station

Radio Unsko-sanskog kantona Radio USK
Bihać; Bosnia and Herzegovina
- Broadcast area: Una-Sana Canton; Bosanska Krajina
- Frequencies: Kulen Vakuf 89.9 MHz; Bosanski Petrovac 90.9 MHz; Bihać 96.2 MHz; Sanski Most 99.5 MHz; Cazin 105.1 MHz
- Branding: Public

Programming
- Language: Bosnian language
- Format: Local news, talk and music

Ownership
- Owner: JP Radio- televizija Unsko sanskog kantona d.o.o. Bihać
- Sister stations: RTV USK

History
- First air date: August 15, 1996
- Former call signs: RTV USK

Technical information
- Transmitter coordinates: 44°49′N 15°52′E
- Repeaters: Kulen Vakuf/Boškovića greda Bosanski Petrovac/Vršić; Bihać/Brekovica-Maći; Sanski Most/Lokveni vrh Velika Gomila/(Cazin)USK

Links
- Webcast: www.rtvusk.ba/live/radio.php
- Website: www.rtvusk.ba

Radio Unsko-sanskog kantona or Radio USK is a Bosnian local public radio station, broadcasting from Bihać, Bosnia and Herzegovina and it broadcasts a variety of programs such as news, music, morning and talk shows. Program is operated by RTV USK and it is mainly produced in Bosnian language.

Radio Unsko-sanskog kantona was launched on 15 August 1996 as regional (Canton) public radio station in Una-Sana Canton.

Estimated number of potential listeners of Radio Unsko-sanskog kantona in Una-Sana Canton and Bosanska Krajina area is around 403.850.

Due to the favorable geographical position in Bosanska Krajina area, this radiostation is also available in neighboring Croatia. Radio USK is also available via internet and via IPTV platforms in BiH (Moja TV - Channel 182).

== Mix Shows ==
- A State of Trance - Internationally recognized mix show hosted by Armin van Buuren and Reuben de Rondé (Monday nights at 23h)
- Transitions - hosted by John Digweed (Friday nights at 22h)
- Tiësto's Club Life - hosted by veteran DJ Tiësto (Friday at 23h)
- In The Mood - hosted by Lebanese-Nigerian DJ Nicole Moudaber
- Planet Perfecto - hosted by Paul Oakenfold
- Nuvolve Radio - UK garage mix show hosted by DJ EZ
- UMF Radio - hosted by RioTGeaR
- Spinnin' Sessions

== Frequencies ==
The program of Radio USK is currently broadcast at 6 frequencies:

- Kulen Vakuf 89.9 MHz
- Bosanski Petrovac 90.9 MHz
- Bihać 96.2 MHz
- Sanski Most 99.5 MHz
- Cazin 105.1 MHz

== Radio USK 2 ==
Radio USK 2 is internet radio streaming service.

== See also ==
- List of radio stations in Bosnia and Herzegovina
- Radio Bihać
- Radio Bosanski Petrovac
- Radio Bosanska Krupa
- Radio Sana
- Radio Ključ
- Radio Velika Kladuša
