= Neovisni Radio Feral =

Bosnian radio station

Kalesija; Bosnia and Herzegovina
- Broadcast area: Bosansko Podrinje; Tuzla Canton area
- Frequencies: Kalesija 92.7 MHz; Lukavac 100.4 MHz
- RDS: R.FERAL

Programming
- Language: Bosnian language
- Format: Local news, talk and music

Ownership
- Owner: FERAL d.o.o. Kalesija

History
- Founded: May 1, 1998
- First air date: 1992
- Former names: Radio Kalesija

Technical information
- Licensing authority: CRA BiH
- Transmitter coordinates: 44°27′N 18°52′E
- Repeaters: Kalesija/Jajići; Lukavac/Merajka

Links
- Webcast: Listen Live
- Website: www.radio-feral.ba

Neovisni Radio Feral or Nezavisni Radio Feral is a Bosnian local commercial radio station, broadcasting from Kalesija, Bosnia and Herzegovina.

This radio station broadcasts a variety of programs such as music, talk show and local news. According to media reports, one of the most listened radio stations in BiH is Radio Feral Kalesija.

Program is mainly produced in Bosnian language at two FM frequencies and it is available in the city of Kalesija as well as in nearby municipalities in Tuzla Canton and Bosansko Podrinje area.

Estimated number of listeners of Neovisni Radio Feral is around 164.431.

The owner of the local radio station is the company FERAL d.o.o. Kalesija.

== History ==
It was founded by local municipal council of Kalesija in 1992 (during the war in Bosnia and Herzegovina) as public radio station Radio Kalesija. From 1992 until 1998, Radio Kalesija operated as local public radio station under the jurisdiction of local authorities in Bosnia and Herzegovina.

On 1 May 1998, radio station was re-registered in Communications Regulatory Agency of Bosnia and Herzegovina as private, commercial radio station Neovisni Radio Feral.

== Frequencies ==
- Kalesija 92.7 MHz
- Lukavac 100.4 MHz

== See also ==
- List of radio stations in Bosnia and Herzegovina
- Radio Tuzlanskog Kantona
- Radio Lukavac
- Radio Kladanj
- Radio Glas Drine
- Radio Olovo
