= Big Radio 3 =

Bosnian radio station

- Banja Luka; Bosnia and Herzegovina
- Broadcast area: Bosanska Krajina
- Frequency: Banja Luka 96.5 MHz
- RDS: BIG 3

Programming
- Language: Serbian language
- Format: Local news, talk and music
- Network: Big Radio

Ownership
- Owner: BIG RADIO d.o.o. Banja Luka
- Sister stations: Big Radio 1 Big Radio 2 Big Radio 4

History
- Founded: 2006

Technical information
- Licensing authority: CRA BiH
- Transmitter coordinates: 44°46′N 17°11′E
- Repeater: Banja Luka/Krčmarice

Links
- Webcast: Listen Live
- Website: www.bigradiobl.com

Big Radio 3 is a Bosnian local commercial radio station, broadcasting from Banja Luka, Bosnia and Herzegovina. This radio station broadcasts a variety of programs such as foreign pop music and local news. The owner of the radio station is the company BIG RADIO d.o.o. Banja Luka.

Estimated number of listeners of Big Radio 3 is around 203,988.

== Frequencies ==
- Banja Luka 96.5 MHz

== Programming ==
- Programming is mainly produced in Serbian at one FM frequency (Banja Luka 96.5 MHz) and it is available in the city of Banja Luka as well as in nearby cities and municipalities, including Laktaši, Čelinac, Prnjavor, Gradiška and Kotor Varoš. Syndicated mixshows from notable DJs including Armin van Buuren, Nicole Moudaber, John Digweed, and Tiësto air every day at 21:00.

== See also ==
- List of radio stations in Bosnia and Herzegovina
- Big Radio 2
- Radio A
- Pop FM
- RSG Radio
