= Korona Radio 1 =

Bosnian radio station

Trebinje; Bosnia and Herzegovina
- Broadcast area: East Herzegovina
- Frequency: Trebinje 97.7 MHz
- RDS: KORONA-1

Programming
- Language: Serbian
- Format: Local news, talk and music

Ownership
- Owner: Korona d.o.o. Trebinje

History
- Founded: March 8, 2000
- Former names: Korona Radio

Technical information
- Licensing authority: CRA BiH
- Transmitter coordinates: 42°42′43″N 18°20′46″E
- Repeater: Trebinje/Leotar

Links
- Website: www.koronaonline.com

Korona Radio 1 or Korona Radio is a Bosnian local commercial radio station, broadcasting from Trebinje, Bosnia and Herzegovina.

This radio station broadcasts a variety of programs such as pop-rock music with local news. The owner of the radio station is the company Korona d.o.o. Trebinje.

Korona Radio was launched on 8 March 2000. Since 2018, the second radio station program Korona Radio 2 has been launched, which mainly broadcasts folk or popular regional music.

The program is mainly produced in Serbian at one FM frequency (Trebinje 97.7 MHz) and it is available in the city of Trebinje as well as in nearby municipalities of East Herzegovina and in neighboring Montenegro and Croatia.

Estimated number of listeners of Korona Radio 1 is around 37.825.

== Frequencies ==
- Trebinje 97.7 MHz

== See also ==
- List of radio stations in Bosnia and Herzegovina
- Korona Radio 2
- Radio Trebinje
- Radio Bileća
- Radio Nevesinje
- Radio Gacko
- Radio Padrino
