= Radio Padrino =

Bosnian radio station

Trebinje; Bosnia and Herzegovina
- Broadcast area: East Herzegovina
- Frequency: Trebinje 90.8 MHz
- RDS: PADRINO

Programming
- Language: Serbian
- Format: Local news, talk and music

Ownership
- Owner: HP media group d.o.o. Trebinje

History
- Founded: April 20, 2018

Technical information
- Licensing authority: CRA BiH
- Transmitter coordinates: 42°42′43″N 18°20′46″E
- Repeater: Trebinje/Hrupjela

Links
- Website: www.radiopadrino.com www.hercegovinapromo.com

Radio Padrino or Padrino Radio is a Bosnian local commercial radio station, broadcasting from Trebinje, Bosnia and Herzegovina. This radio station broadcasts a variety of programs such as pop and rock music, talk shows and local news.

Radio Padrino was established in February 2018 by the company HP media group d.o.o. Trebinje.

Since 20 April 2018, the program is mainly produced in Serbian at one FM frequency (Trebinje 90.8 MHz) and it is available in the city of Trebinje as well as in nearby municipalities of East Herzegovina and in neighboring Montenegro and Croatia.

Estimated number of listeners of Radio Padrino is around 25,871.

== Frequencies ==
- Trebinje 90.8 MHz

== See also ==
- List of radio stations in Bosnia and Herzegovina
- Korona Radio 1
- Korona Radio 2
- Radio Trebinje
- Radio Bileća
- Radio Nevesinje
- Radio Gacko
