= Radio UNO (Banja Luka) =

Bosnian radio station

Banja Luka; Bosnia and Herzegovina
- Broadcast area: Banja Luka
- Frequency: Banja Luka 107.5 MHz
- RDS: U N O

Programming
- Language: Serbian language
- Format: Local news, talk and music

Ownership
- Owner: ELID d.o.o. Banja Luka

History
- Founded: 1998

Technical information
- Licensing authority: CRA BiH
- Transmitter coordinates: 44°46′N 17°11′E
- Repeater: Banja Luka/Šehitluci (Šibovi)

Links
- Website: www.unoportal.net

Radio UNO or UNO Radio is a Bosnian local commercial radio station, broadcasting from Banja Luka, Bosnia and Herzegovina. This radio station broadcasts a variety of programs such as pop-rock music and local news. The owner of the radio station is the company ELID d.o.o. Banja Luka.

Program is mainly produced in Serbian language at one FM frequency (Banja Luka 107.5 MHz) and it is available in the city of Banja Luka as well as in nearby municipalities.

Estimated number of listeners of Radio UNO is around 144.267.

== Frequencies ==
- Banja Luka 107.5 MHz

== See also ==
- List of radio stations in Bosnia and Herzegovina
- Big Radio 1
- Radio A
- Pop FM
- Hard Rock Radio
- Plavi FM
- Nes Radio
