= Radio Magic (Milići) =

Bosnian radio station

- Milići; Bosnia and Herzegovina
- Broadcast area: Bosansko Podrinje
- Frequencies: Bratunac/Divič 102.8 MHz; Bratunac/Magašići 102.8 MHz; Milići/Milića brdo 103.7 MHz

Programming
- Language: Serbian language

Ownership
- Owner: MAGIC-TRADE d.o.o. Milići

Technical information
- Licensing authority: CRA BiH
- Transmitter coordinates: 44°09′58″N 19°04′30″E
- Repeaters: Bratunac/Divič; Bratunac/Magašići; Milića brdo

Links
- Website: www.magic.ba

Radio Magic or Magic Radio is a Bosnian local commercial radio station, broadcasting from Milići, Bosnia and Herzegovina.

This radio station broadcasts a variety of programs such as folk and pop music, talk show and local news. The owner of the radio station is the company MAGIC-TRADE d.o.o. Milići.

Program is mainly produced in Serbian language at three FM frequencies and it is available in the Bosansko Podrinje area and in parts of neighboring Serbia.

Estimated number of listeners of Radio Magic is around 52.346.

== Frequencies ==
- Bratunac/Divič 102.8 MHz
- Bratunac/Magašići 102.8 MHz
- Milići/Milića brdo 103.7 MHz

== See also ==
- List of radio stations in Bosnia and Herzegovina
- Radio Vlasenica
- Radio Višegrad
- Radio Goražde
- Radio Osvit
