= Radio Majevica =

Bosnian radio station

Lopare; Bosnia and Herzegovina
- Broadcast area: Semberija
- Frequency: Lopare 87.9 MHz

Programming
- Language: Serbian language
- Format: Local news, talk and music

Ownership
- Owner: Radio Kristal d.o.o. Lopare

History
- First air date: March 14, 2014

Technical information
- Licensing authority: CRA BiH
- Transmitter coordinates: 44°38′10″N 18°50′40″E
- Repeater: Lopare/Zajednice

Links
- Website: www.radiomajevica.com

Radio Majevica is a Bosnian local commercial radio station, broadcasting from Lopare, Bosnia and Herzegovina. This radio station broadcasts a variety of programs such as folk and turbo-folk music with local news.

Program is mainly produced in Serbian language at one FM frequency (Lopare 87.9 MHz) and it is available in Lopare near Bijeljina as well as in nearby municipalities in Semberija area.

Before broadcasting on their own FM frequency, in 2014, in order to inform the citizens about the latest developments, the Municipality of Lopare, in cooperation with the Municipality of Ugljevik, implemented a project for the exchange of content between Radio Skala and Radio Majevica. Every Sunday from 12:00 to 14:00 on the waves of Skala Radio from the studio of Radio Majevica listeners can hear the latest news and information from the Municipality of Lopare.

After BHRT has abandoned the launch of the BH Radio 2 program in 2019, reserved frequencies were allocated to other interested stations across Bosnia and Herzegovina through the competition where company „KRISTAL INŽINJERING“ d.o.o. Lopare met the criteria and it received own FM frequency and increased their coverage.

The owner of the local radio station is the company Radio Kristal d.o.o. Lopare.

Estimated number of listeners of Radio Majevica is around 16.511.

== Frequencies ==
- Lopare 87.9 MHz

== See also ==
- List of radio stations in Bosnia and Herzegovina
- Daš Radio
- Daš Extra Radio
- BN Radio
- Bobar Radio
- Bobar Radio - Studio B2
- Radio Slobomir
- Radio Skala
