= Hard Rock Radio =

Serbian radio station

Banja Luka; Bosnia and Herzegovina
- Broadcast area: Banja Luka
- Frequency: Banja Luka 102.7 MHz
- RDS: HARDROCK

Programming
- Language: Serbian
- Format: Local news, talk and music

Ownership
- Owner: "Radio Bulevar" d.o.o. Banja Luka

History
- Founded: November 14, 2002
- Former names: Radio Bulevar

Technical information
- Licensing authority: CRA BiH
- Transmitter coordinates: 44°46′N 17°11′E
- Repeater: Banja Luka/Šibovi

Links
- Website: www.hardrockradio.ba

Hard Rock Radio is a Serbian local commercial radio station, broadcasting from Banja Luka, Bosnia and Herzegovina. This radio station broadcasts a variety of programs such as urban and hard rock music with local news. The owner of the radio station is the company Radio Bulevar d.o.o. Banja Luka.

Under this name, Hard Rock Radio was launched on 14 November 2002 when local radio station Radio Bulevar was rebranded.

The program is mainly produced in Serbian at one FM frequency (Banja Luka 102.7 MHz) and it is available in the city of Banja Luka as well as in nearby municipalities Laktaši, Čelinac, Prnjavor, Bosanska Gradiška/Gradiška and Kotor Varoš.

Estimated number of listeners of Hard Rock Radio is around 183.650.

== Frequencies ==
- Banja Luka 102.7 MHz

== See also ==
- List of radio stations in Bosnia and Herzegovina
- Big Radio 1
- Radio A
- Pop FM
- Plavi FM
- RSG Radio
