= Radio Skala =

Bosnian radio station

- <img src='https://i.ibb.co/3SW2H9w/Skala-radio-Ugljevik-logo.jpg' alt='Skala-radio-Ugljevik-logo' border='0' />

Ugljevik; Bosnia and Herzegovina
- Broadcast area: Semberija
- Frequency: Majevica 96.8 MHz
- RDS: SKALA

Programming
- Language: Serbian language
- Format: Local news, talk and music

Ownership
- Owner: Lux Commerce" d.o.o. Ugljevik

History
- Founded: 1996

Technical information
- Licensing authority: CRA BiH
- Transmitter coordinates: 44°41′36″N 18°59′40″E
- Repeater: Majevica/Udrigovo

Links
- Website: www.skalaradio.net

Radio Skala is a Bosnian local commercial radio station, broadcasting from Ugljevik, Bosnia and Herzegovina. This radio station broadcasts a variety of programs such as popular pop and folk music with local news.

Program is mainly produced in Serbian language at one FM frequency (Majevica 96.8 MHz) and it is available in the city of Ugljevik near Bijeljina as well as in nearby municipalities in Semberija, Bosanska Posavina and Bosansko Podrinje area.

The owner of the local radio station is the company Lux Commerce" d.o.o. Ugljevik.

Estimated number of listeners of Radio Skala is around 107.906.

== Frequencies ==
- Majevica 96.8 MHz

== See also ==
- List of radio stations in Bosnia and Herzegovina
- Daš Radio
- Daš Extra Radio
- BN Radio
- Bobar Radio
- Bobar Radio - Studio B2
- Radio Slobomir
- Radio Glas Drine
