= Radio Srebrenik =

Bosnian radio station

Srebrenik; Bosnia and Herzegovina
- Broadcast area: Tuzla Canton
- Frequencies: Srebrenik 90.8 MHz; Tuzla 103.0 MHz
- Branding: Public

Programming
- Language: Bosnian language
- Format: Local news, talk and music

Ownership
- Owner: JU Centar za kulturu i informisanje, Srebrenik

History
- First air date: November 29, 1971
- Call sign meaning: SREBRENI

Technical information
- Transmitter coordinates: 44°42′N 18°29′E
- Repeaters: Srebrenik/Karahum; Tuzla/Ilinčica

Links
- Webcast: On website
- Website: www.radiosrebrenik.ba

Radio Srebrenik is a Bosnian local public radio station, broadcasting from Srebrenik, Bosnia and Herzegovina.

It was launched on 29 November 1971 by the municipal council of Srebrenik. In Yugoslavia and in SR Bosnia and Herzegovina, it was part of local/municipal Radio Sarajevo network affiliate. This radio station broadcasts a variety of programs such as news, music, morning and talk shows. Program is mainly produced in Bosnian language.

Estimated number of potential listeners of Radio Srebrenik in Tuzla Canton area is around 211.782. Radio station is also available in municipalities of Tuzla Canton, Zenica-Doboj Canton and in Bosanska Posavina and online via internet.

== Frequencies ==
- Srebrenik 90.8 MHz
- Tuzla 103.0 MHz

== See also ==
- List of radio stations in Bosnia and Herzegovina
- Radio Gračanica
- Radio Tuzla
