= Radio Srbac =

Bosnian radio station

Radio Srbac Радио Србац
Srbac; Bosnia and Herzegovina
- Broadcast area: Srbac
- Frequency: Gradiška 93.2 MHz
- Branding: Public

Programming
- Language: Serbian
- Format: Local news, talk and music

Ownership
- Owner: JP "Radio Srbac" Srbac

History
- First air date: 1974

Technical information
- Transmitter coordinates: 45°5′45″N 17°31′9″E
- Repeater: Srbac/Jozino brdo

Links
- Webcast: On website
- Website: www.radiosrbac.com

Radio Srbac or Радио Србац is a Bosnian local public radio station, broadcasting from Srbac, Bosnia and Herzegovina.

It was launched in 1974 by the municipal council of Srbac. In Yugoslavia and in SR Bosnia and Herzegovina, it was part of local/municipal Radio Sarajevo network affiliate. It broadcasts programs including local news, music, sport and talk shows, mainly produced in Second.

The estimated number of listeners is around 15,707. It is also available in neighboring Croatia.

== Frequencies ==
- Srbac 93.2 MHz

== See also ==
- List of radio stations in Bosnia and Herzegovina
- Radio Gradiška
- Radio Kostajnica
