= Hrvatski Radio Bobovac =

Bosnian radio station

Hrvatski Radio Bobovac Radio Bobovac
Vareš; Bosnia and Herzegovina
- Broadcast area: Vareš
- Frequencies: Vareš 95.3 MHz; Vareš 101.1 MHz

Programming
- Language: Croatian
- Format: Local news, talk and music

Ownership
- Owner: Hrvatski radio Bobovac d.o.o. Vareš

History
- Founded: August 1993; June 6, 1995

Technical information
- Licensing authority: CRA BiH
- Transmitter coordinates: 44°09′43″N 18°19′37″E
- Repeaters: Vareš / Dikinjići; Vareš / Vijaka Lok/Krčevine

Links
- Webcast: Listen Live
- Website: www.radiobobovac.com

Hrvatski Radio Bobovac or Radio Bobovac is a Bosnian local commercial radio station, broadcasting from Vareš, Bosnia and Herzegovina. This radio station broadcasts a variety of programs such as domestic music, talk shows and local news.

Program is mainly produced in Croatian at two FM frequencies and it is available in the city of Vareš as well as in nearby municipalities in Zenica-Doboj Canton area.

The estimated number of listeners of Radio Bobovac is around 8,193.

== History ==
It was founded in August 1993 by local municipal council of Vareš (during the war in Bosnia and Herzegovina) and it operated as public radio station from 1993 until 2000.

When Bosniak-Croat war started, radio station broadcast program occasionally with breaks. From December 1993 to December 1994, Radio Bobovac broadcast its program from Kiseljak for two hours a day from the studio-directing premises of the Radio Kiseljak radio station. The interruption in the broadcasting of the program lasted from Christmas 1994 to the beginning of June 1995, during which time work was done on the procurement of equipment and provision of space for the start of program broadcasting in the municipality of Vareš.

In April 2000, Radio Bobovac was re-registered in Communications Regulatory Agency of Bosnia and Herzegovina as private, commercial radio station.

The owner of the local radio station is the company Hrvatski radio Bobovac d.o.o. Vareš.

== Frequencies ==
- Vareš 95.3 MHz
- Vareš 101.1 MHz

== See also ==
- List of radio stations in Bosnia and Herzegovina
- Radio Zenica
- Radio TNT Zenica
- Radio Zenit
- Radio Visoko
- Radio Kakanj
