= Radio Žepče =

Bosnian radio station

Žepče; Bosnia and Herzegovina
- Broadcast area: Zenica-Doboj Canton
- Frequencies: Žepče 88.2 MHz; Žepče 101.6 MHz
- Branding: Public

Programming
- Language: Croatian
- Format: Local news, talk and music

Ownership
- Owner: JU Dom kulture Žepče

History
- First air date: October 10, 2007
- Call sign meaning: R.ZEPCE

Technical information
- Transmitter coordinates: 44°26′N 18°02′E
- Repeaters: Žepče/Stražbenica; Žepče/Matinski vis

Links
- Website: www.radiozepce.com

Radio Žepče is a Bosnian local public radio station, broadcasting from Žepče, Bosnia and Herzegovina. The radio station is available in municipalities of Zenica-Doboj Canton.It was launched on 10 October 2007 by the municipal council of Žepče.

This radio station broadcasts a variety of programs such as music, talk shows and local news. Program is mainly produced in Croatian. Estimated number of potential listeners of Radio Žepče is around 146.413

== Frequencies ==
The program is currently broadcast at 2 frequencies:

- Žepče 88.2 MHz
- Žepče 101.6 MHz

== See also ==
- List of radio stations in Bosnia and Herzegovina
- Radio Zenica
- Radio Doboj
