= Drukčiji Radio =

Bosnian radio station

Novi Travnik; Bosnia and Herzegovina
- Frequency: 94.7 MHz
- RDS: DRUKCIJI

Programming
- Language: Croatian
- Format: Local news, talk and music

Ownership
- Owner: Privatna ustanova radiopostaja Novi Travnik

History
- Founded: July 7, 1992 (as a public station); November 11, 2013 (as a commercial station)
- Former names: Radio/Radiopostaja Novi Travnik

Technical information
- Licensing authority: CRA BiH
- Transmitter coordinates: 44°10′29″N 17°39′48″E
- Repeater: Travnik/Bukovica

Links
- Webcast: Listen Live
- Website: www.drukciji.ba

Drukčiji Radio is a Bosnian local commercial radio station, broadcasting from Novi Travnik, Bosnia and Herzegovina. This radio station broadcasts a variety of programs such as music, talk shows and local news.

Program is mainly produced in Croatian at one FM frequency (Novi Travnik 94.7 MHz) and it is available in the city of Novi Travnik as well as in nearby municipalities in Central Bosnia Canton area.

Estimated number of listeners of Drukčiji Radio is around 105.858.

== History ==
It was founded by local municipal council of Novi Travnik on 7 July 1992 (during the war in Bosnia and Herzegovina) as public radio station Radio Novi Travnik (in Bosnian) or Radiopostaja Novi Travnik (in Croatian). From 1992 until 14 November 2009, Radio Novi Travnik or Radiopostaja Novi Travnik operated as local public radio station under the jurisdiction of local authorities in Bosnia and Herzegovina.

On 11 November 2013, Drukčiji Radio was re-registered in Communications Regulatory Agency of Bosnia and Herzegovina as private, commercial radio station, the legal successor of the former public radio station Radio/Radiopostaja Novi Travnik.

The owner of the local radio station is the company Privatna ustanova radiopostaja Novi Travnik

== Frequencies ==
- Novi Travnik 94.7 MHz

== See also ==
- List of radio stations in Bosnia and Herzegovina
- Radio Vitez
- Radio Jajce
- Radio Busovača
- Radio TNT Travnik
