= Plavi FM =

Bosnian radio station

- Banja Luka; Bosnia and Herzegovina
- Broadcast area: Banja Luka
- Frequency: Banja Luka 105.3 MHz
- RDS: PLAVI FM

Programming
- Language: Serbian
- Format: Local news, talk and music

Ownership
- Owner: BL PLAVI 2013 d.o.o. Banja Luka

History
- Founded: 2014
- Former names: Plavi Radio

Technical information
- Licensing authority: CRA BiH
- Transmitter coordinates: 44°46′N 17°11′E
- Repeater: Banja Luka/Krčmarice-Stjepanova glava

Links
- Website: www.plaviradio.net

Plavi FM or Plavi Radio Banja Luka is a Bosnian local commercial radio station, broadcasting from Banja Luka, Bosnia and Herzegovina. This radio station broadcasts a variety of programs such as music and local news. The owner of the radio station is the company BL PLAVI 2013 d.o.o. Banja Luka.

The program is mainly produced in Serbian at one FM frequency (Banja Luka 105.3 MHz) and it is available in the city of Banja Luka as well as in nearby cities and municipalities, including Laktaši, Čelinac, Prnjavor, Gradiška and Kotor Varoš.

Estimated number of listeners of Plavi FM is around 248,678.

== Frequencies ==
- Banja Luka 105.3 MHz

== See also ==
- List of radio stations in Bosnia and Herzegovina
- Big Radio 1
- Radio A
- Pop FM
- Hard Rock Radio
- RSG Radio
