= Radio Vlasenica =

Bosnian radio station

Radio Vlasenica Радио Власеница
Vlasenica; Bosnia and Herzegovina
- Broadcast area: Podrinje
- Frequency: Vlasenica 100.6 MHz
- Branding: Public

Programming
- Language: Serbian language
- Format: Local news, talk and music

Ownership
- Owner: JU Kulturni centar Vlasenica

History
- First air date: April 21, 2020
- Call sign meaning: VL RADIO

Technical information
- Transmitter coordinates: 44°11′N 18°56′E
- Repeater: Vlasenica/Kik

Links
- Website: www.radiovlasenica.com

Radio Vlasenica or Радио Власеница is a Bosnian local public radio station, broadcasting from Vlasenica, Bosnia and Herzegovina.

It was launched on 20 April 2020 as local/municipal radio station. Radio station broadcasts a variety of programs such as local news, music, sport and talk shows. Program is mainly produced in Serbian language

Estimated number of potential listeners of Radio Vlasenica is around 28.233. Radio station is also available in municipalities of Podrinje area and in neighboring Serbia.

== Frequencies ==
- Vlasenica 100.6 MHz

== See also ==
- List of radio stations in Bosnia and Herzegovina
- Radio Višegrad
- Radio Goražde
