= Radio Miljacka =

Bosnian radio station

- Sarajevo; Bosnia and Herzegovina
- Broadcast area: Sarajevo
- Frequency: Sarajevo 95.2 MHz

Programming
- Language: Bosnian language
- Format: Variety, Folk Music

Ownership
- Owner: "Radio televizija 8" d.o.o. Sarajevo
- Sister stations: Radio 8

History
- First air date: 1 August 2018
- Call sign meaning: Miljacka

Technical information
- Facility ID: Sarajevo/Grdonj
- Transmitter coordinates: 43°52′N 18°25′E

Links
- Website: www.radiomiljacka.ba

Radio Miljacka is a Bosnian commercial radio station, broadcasting from Sarajevo, Bosnia and Herzegovina.

Radio Miljacka began broadcasting on 1 August 2018. and it was formatted as Variety radio station with Bosnian music and Balkan music, talk shows and short news. The radio station is owned by the company Radio televizija 8 d.o.o. Sarajevo, which is also the owner of sister station Radio 8.

The program is currently broadcast at one frequency for Sarajevo area 95.2 MHz and the headquarters is located in Stari Grad Sarajevo, Vratnik neighborhood.

== Frequencies ==
- Sarajevo 95.2 MHz

== See also ==
- List of radio stations in Bosnia and Herzegovina
