= Radio Trebinje =

Bosnian radio station

Radio Trebinje Радио Требиње
Trebinje; Bosnia and Herzegovina
- Broadcast area: East Herzegovina
- Frequency: Trebinje 95.9 MHz
- Branding: Public

Programming
- Language: Serbian
- Format: Local news, talk and music

Ownership
- Owner: Centar za informisanje i obrazovanje Trebinje

History
- First air date: November 29, 1975
- Call sign meaning: TREBINJE

Technical information
- Transmitter coordinates: 42°42′43″N 18°20′46″E
- Repeater: Trebinje/Leotar

Links
- Webcast: On website
- Website: www.radiotrebinje.com

Radio Trebinje or Радио Требиње is a local public radio station, broadcasting from Trebinje, Republic of Srpska.

It was launched on 29 November 1975 as first electronic media in eastern Herzegovina.

In Yugoslavia and in SR Bosnia and Herzegovina, it was part of local/municipal Radio Sarajevo network affiliate. This radio station broadcasts a variety of programs such as local news, music, sport and talk shows.

Program is produced in Serbian, from 08:00 to 19:00.

Estimated number of potential listeners of Radio Trebinje is around 39,408. Radiostation is also available in municipalities of East Herzegovina and in neighboring Montenegro and Croatia.

== Frequencies ==
- Trebinje 95.9 MHz

== See also ==
- List of radio stations in Bosnia and Herzegovina
- Radio Nevesinje
- Radio Bileća
- Radio Padrino
- Korona Radio
