= Radio Zenit =

Bosnian radio station

- Zenica; Bosnia and Herzegovina
- Broadcast area: Zenica
- Frequency: Zenica 100.7 MHz
- RDS: *ZENIT*

Programming
- Language: Bosnian language
- Format: Local news, talk and music

Ownership
- Owner: B-U Specijal d.o.o. Zenica

History
- Founded: December 26, 1998

Technical information
- Licensing authority: CRA BiH
- Transmitter coordinates: 44°12′14″N 17°54′28″E
- Repeater: Zenica/Lisac

Links
- Website: www.zenit.ba

Radio Zenit is a Bosnian local commercial radio station, broadcasting from Zenica, Bosnia and Herzegovina. This radio station broadcasts a variety of programs such as pop-rock music and local news.

The owner of the radio station is the company B-U Specijal d.o.o. Zenica.

Radio Zenit was founded on 26 December 1998. Program is mainly produced in Bosnian language at one FM frequency (Zenica 100.7 MHz) and it is available in the city of Zenica as well as in nearby municipalities in Zenica-Doboj Canton, Central Bosnia Canton, Sarajevo Canton and even in parts of Herzegovina-Neretva Canton.

Estimated number of listeners of Radio Zenit is around 194.832. Radio station is also available via internet and via IPTV platforms in BiH (Moja TV - Channel 262).

== Frequencies ==
- Zenica 100.7 MHz

== See also ==
- List of radio stations in Bosnia and Herzegovina
- Radio Zenica
- Narodni radio Zenica
- Radio Kakanj
- Radio Breza
- Radio Visoko
- Radio Olovo
