= Radio Sana =

Bosnian radio station

Sanski Most; Bosnia and Herzegovina
- Broadcast area: Una-Sana Canton
- Frequency: Sanski Most 103.7 MHz
- Branding: Public

Programming
- Language: Bosnian language
- Format: Local news, talk and music

Ownership
- Owner: JP RTV "Sana" Sanski Most
- Sister stations: RTV Sana

History
- First air date: October 1995

Technical information
- Transmitter coordinates: 44°46′N 16°40′E
- Repeater: Sanski Most/Lokveni vrh

Links
- Webcast: On website
- Website: www.sanartv.ba

Radio Sana is a Bosnian local public radio station, broadcasting from Sanski Most, Bosnia and Herzegovina.

== History ==
Until 1992, Radio Sanski Most operated as part of local/municipal Radio Sarajevo network affiliate. During the Bosnian War, on April 19, 1992, units of the Serbian Democratic Party (SDS) and paramilitary forces stormed the radio premises and took power, after which all Bosniak and Croat journalists were fired. Radio station was used for propaganda. Sanski Most was controlled by the Army of Republika Srpska (Bosnian Serbs) and remained under its control until October 1995 when the Army of Bosnia and Herzegovina took over it during Operation Sana shortly before the end of the war. During the withdrawal from Sanski Most, Serb forces blew up the building that housed the radio station and much of the archival documentation. After the liberation of the city, a new municipal radio station was established under its current name, Radio Sana.

Program is mainly produced in Bosnian language at one FM frequency (Sanski Most 103.7 MHz) and it broadcasts a variety of programs such as local news, talk shows and music. Local public cable television channel RTV Sana is also part of public municipality services.

Estimated number of potential listeners of Radio Sana is around 168.284.

Due to the geographical position in Bosanska Krajina area, this radiostation is also available in municipalities: Bihać, Cazin, Prijedor, Bužim, Bosanski Novi and in neighboring Croatia.

== Frequencies ==
- Sanski Most 103.7 MHz

== See also ==
- List of radio stations in Bosnia and Herzegovina
- Radio Bosanska Krupa
- Radio Bosanski Petrovac
