= Radio Rama =

Bosnian radio station

Radio Rama Radio postaja Rama
Prozor-Rama; Bosnia and Herzegovina
- Broadcast area: Herzegovina-Neretva Canton
- Frequency: Prozor-Rama 88.8 MHz
- Branding: Public

Programming
- Language: Croatian
- Format: Local news, talk and music

Ownership
- Owner: JP "Radio Rama" d.o.o.

History
- First air date: June 8, 1993
- Call sign meaning: R RAMA

Technical information
- Transmitter coordinates: 43°49′12″N 17°36′36″E
- Repeater: Prozor-Rama/Makljen

Links
- Website: www.radio-rama.info

Radio Rama or Radio postaja Rama is a Bosnian local public radio station, broadcasting from Prozor-Rama, Bosnia and Herzegovina.

It was launched on 6 June 1993 by local municipal council as public company JP "Radio Rama" d.o.o.. This radio station broadcasts a variety of programs such as music, talk shows and local news. Program is mainly produced in Croatian from 8 am to 6:30 pm.

Estimated number of potential listeners of Radio Rama is around 10.615

The radio station is also available in municipalities Jablanica and Konjic and program is also available via internet for listeners in BiH or in diaspora.

== Frequencies ==
The program is currently broadcast at one frequency.

- Prozor-Rama 88.8 MHz

== See also ==
- List of radio stations in Bosnia and Herzegovina
- Radio Konjic
- Radio Jablanica
