= Radio Feniks =

Bosnian radio station

Kozarska Dubica; Bosnia and Herzegovina
- Broadcast area: Kozarska Dubica
- Frequency: Kozarska Dubica 94.7 MHz
- RDS: FENIKS

Programming
- Language: Serbian language

Ownership
- Owner: FENIKS-ALFA d.o.o. Kozarska Dubica

History
- First air date: May 6, 1997; February 22, 2002

Technical information
- Licensing authority: CRA BiH
- Transmitter coordinates: 45°11′N 16°48′E
- Repeater: Kozarska Dubica/Krivdića brdo

Links
- Website: www.radiofeniks.com

Radio Feniks is a Bosnian local commercial radio station, broadcasting from Kozarska Dubica, Bosnia and Herzegovina.

This radio station broadcasts a variety of programs such as music, talk show and local news.

The owner of the radio station is the company FENIKS-ALFA d.o.o. Kozarska Dubica.

Radio Feniks was founded on 6 May 1997 in Prijedor, where it operated until 22 February 2002 after which radio station was relocated to current location in Kozarska Dubica.

Program is mainly produced in Serbian language at one FM frequency (Kozarska Dubica 94.7 MHz) and it is available in the Kozarska Dubica area and in neighboring Croatia.

Estimated number of listeners of Radio Feniks is around 17.129.

== Frequencies ==
- Kozarska Dubica 94.7 MHz

== See also ==
- List of radio stations in Bosnia and Herzegovina
- Dub Radio
- Radio Gradiška
- DiV Radio
- Radio Kontakt
- Free Radio Prijedor
