= Communications and media in Sarajevo =

The Avaz Twist Tower is the headquarters of the Sarajevo newspaper Dnevni avaz

As the capital and largest city of Bosnia and Herzegovina, Sarajevo is naturally the main center of the country's media. Most of the country's major television channels are based in the city, as are the most popular newspapers and magazines.

Newspapers are the most popular and most well established forms of media. The two most popular and credible daily newspapers are the Oslobođenje and Dnevni avaz. Dnevni avaz (the Daily Voice) is today the more successful of the two. The Oslobođenje is the older and more well known of the two. Meaning "The Liberation", it was established in Sarajevo following World War II as the communist party's newspaper. Oslobođenje has preserved somewhat leftist views.

Klix.ba became the first media outlet from Bosnia and Herzegovina to have a verified Facebook page. Infostaza was the first newspaper in Bosnia and Herzegovina published exclusively online.

As well as professional newspapers, Sarajevo is also home to a variety of magazines and political tabloids, such as Slobodna Bosna, Dani, and Walter, all of which have a high circulation.

Television is very popular in Sarajevo. Satellites allow for a number of foreign channels to be watched, but the most popular are the local news stations based in the city. Federalna televizija (FTV) is the television of the Federation of Bosnia and Herzegovina entity, while there is also a national radio-television system named Radio and Television of Bosnia and Herzegovina. TVSA, a public TV channel founded by the Sarajevo Canton Assembly, is also available.

Apart from the government affiliated channels, there are several other television stations, perhaps the most prominent being Hayat TV. Another is the Open Broadcast Network, a television station founded by the International community, now privately owned. Television stations from Croatia and Serbia are also available. United Media, an alternative telecom provider in the Balkans, provides television service in Sarajevo as well, with channels such as Nova BH and N1. Additionally, N1 is CNN International's local broadcast partner and affiliate.

Many small independent radio stations exist, although the majority listen to the more established ones such as Radio M, Radio Grad, eFM Student Radio and RSG. RSG, short for Radio Stari Grad (Radio Old Town), is the most popular of these. Radio Free Europe can also be heard, and several American and West European stations are available for listening as well.
