= Radio BM =

- Zenica; Bosnia and Herzegovina
- Broadcast area: Bosnia and Herzegovina
- Frequencies: Central Bosnia 106.3 MHz; Doboj 101.6 MHz; Sarajevo 99.4 MHz; Travnik 92.5 MHz; Tuzla Canton 94.6 MHz; Vitez 92.5 MHz; Zenica-Doboj 99.3 MHz

Programming
- Language: Bosnian language
- Format: Variety

Ownership
- Owner: Radio BM Zenica d.o.o.

History
- First air date: 17 April 1997
- Call sign meaning: RADIO BM

Technical information
- Transmitter coordinates: 44°12′14″N 17°54′28″E

Radio BM is a Bosnian commercial radio station, broadcasting from Zenica.

Radio BM began broadcasting on 17 April 1997, formatted as variety radio station with Bosnian music and national news.

== Frequencies ==
The program is broadcast on seven frequencies:

- Central Bosnia 106.3 MHz
- Doboj 101.6 MHz
- Sarajevo 99.4 MHz
- Travnik 92.5 MHz
- Tuzla Canton 94.6 MHz
- Vitez 92.5 MHz
- Zenica-Doboj 99.3 MHz

== See also ==
- List of radio stations in Bosnia and Herzegovina
