= List of radio stations in Bosnia and Herzegovina =

Radio in Bosnia and Herzegovina was first officially introduced in 1945 by Radio Sarajevo. Out of total 193 radio stations, 171 of radiostations are broadcasting their radio programmes via FM & AM frequencies. The frequencies planned for the DAB and DAB + band are still not used. Broadcast licenses for all frequencies are assigned by state-level Communications Regulatory Agency of Bosnia and Herzegovina.

Three public network radio services are funded through subscription (BH Radio 1, Federalni Radio, Radio Republike Srpske) together with internet radio network operated by the Radio and Television of Bosnia and Herzegovina (BHRT) with 6 thematic radio channels. In terms of ownership, 3 radio stations are non-profit organizations, 9 radio stations in total are funded through subscription (Television licence) while 70 stations are local, municipal or regional public broadcasters which competes with 111 commercial broadcasters in Bosnia and Herzegovina.

The following is a list of radio stations in Bosnia and Herzegovina.

== National and near-national coverage ==
=== Broadcasters funded by Television Tax ===
- BH Radio 1 – national public mainstream radio channel operated by BHRT from Sarajevo.
  - ART Radio – Internet radio operated by MP BHRT
  - DANCE Radio – Internet radio operated by MP BHRT
  - EVERGREEN Radio – Internet radio operated by MP BHRT
  - JAZZ.BA Radio – Internet radio operated by MP BHRT
  - NAŠ Radio – Internet radio operated by MP BHRT
  - SEVDAH Radio – Internet radio operated by MP BHRT
- Federalni Radio – entity level public radio channel operated by RTVFBiH from Sarajevo.
- Radio Republike Srpske – entity level public radio channel operated by RTRS from Banja Luka.

=== Commercial broadcasters ===
- Bobar Radio – Bijeljina
- Radiopostaja "Mir" Međugorje – Međugorje (Religious broadcasting, Christian radio)
- Radio BN – Bijeljina operated by RTV BN
- RSG Radio – Sarajevo operated by RSG Media Group
- Radio Kalman – Sarajevo
- Nes Radio – Banja Luka operated by Nezavisne novine
- Radio BIR – Sarajevo (Religious broadcasting, Islamic radio)
- Radio M – Sarajevo/Vogošća
- Big Radio 2 – Banja Luka operated by Big Radio
- Radio Mix – Sarajevo operated by RSG Media Group
- ORV Radio – Bijela, Brčko operated by OTV Valentino

=== Public broadcasters ===
- Radio Herceg-Bosne – Mostar operated by RTVHB

=== Nonprofit broadcasters ===
- Radio Otvorena mreža – Sarajevo
- Radio Marija BiH – Sarajevo (Religious broadcasting, Christian radio)

== Local and regional coverage ==
=== Public broadcasters ===
- Radio Banovići – Banovići (also on AM frequency)
- Radio Bihać – Bihać
- Radio Bileća – Bileća
- Radio Bosanska Krupa – Bosanska Krupa
- Radio Bosanski Petrovac – Bosanski Petrovac
- Radio Brčko – Brčko
- Radio Brod – Brod
- Radio Bugojno – Bugojno operated by RTV Bugojno
- Radio Busovača – Busovača
- Radio Cazin – Cazin operated by RTV Cazin
- Radiopostaja Čapljina – Čapljina
- Radio Doboj – Doboj operated by RTV Doboj
- Radio Donji Vakuf – Donji Vakuf
- Radio Drvar – Drvar
- Dub Radio – Kozarska Dubica operated by RTV Kozarska Dubica
- Radio Foča – Foča
- Radio Gacko – Gacko
- Radio Goražde – Goražde operated by RTV Goražde
- Radio Gračanica – Gračanica
- Radio Gradačac – Gradačac
- Radio Gradiška – Gradiška
- Radio gradska mreža - Mostarski radio – Mostar
- Mostarska panorama – Mostar
- Radio Ilijaš – Ilijaš
- Radio IS – Istočno Sarajevo operated by RTV IS
- Radio Jablanica – Jablanica operated by RTV Jablanica
- Radio Jajce – Jajce
- Radio Kiss FM – Kiseljak
- Radio Kladanj – Kladanj
- Radio Ključ – Ključ
- Radio Konjic – Konjic
- Radio Kostajnica – Kostajnica
- Radio Kupres – Kupres
- Radio Livno – Livno
- Radio Lukavac – Lukavac operated by TV Lukavac
- Radio Ljubuški – Ljubuški
- Radio Nevesinje – Nevesinje
- Radio Novi Grad – Novi Grad
- Radio Olovo – Olovo
- Radio postaja Odžak – Odžak
- Radio Široki Brijeg – Široki Brijeg
- Radio Posušje – Posušje
- Radio Prača – Prača
- Radio Preporod – Odžak
- Radiopostaja Orašje – Orašje
- Radio Prijedor – Prijedor operated by TV Prijedor
- Radio Prnjavor – Prnjavor
- Radio Rama – Prozor
- Radio Sana – Sanski Most operated by RTV Sana
- Radio Srbac – Srbac
- Radio Srebrenik – Srebrenik
- Radio Tomislavgrad – Tomislavgrad
- Radio Trebinje – Trebinje
- Radio Tuzla – Tuzla operated by TV 7
- Radio Tuzlanskog kantona – Tuzla operated by RTV TK
- Radio TK – Studio Banovići – Banovići operated by Radio TK
- Radio TK – Studio Srebrenica – Srebrenica operated by Radio TK
- Radio USK – Bihać operated by RTV USK
- Radio Usora – Usora
- Radio Velika Kladuša – Velika Kladuša
- Radio Vlasenica – Vlasenica
- Radio Visoko – Visoko operated by TV Visoko
- Radio Višegrad – Višegrad
- Radio Vitez – Vitez
- Radio Vogošća – Vogošća operated by TV Vogošća
- Radio Zenica – Zenica
- Radio Žepče – Žepče

=== Commercial broadcasters ===
- Radio A – Banja Luka operated by ATV
- Antena Radio Jelah – Tešanj
- Antena Sarajevo – Sarajevo operated by RSG Media Group
- Radio ASK – Ilidža
- Big Radio 1 – Banja Luka operated by Big Radio
- Big Radio 3 – Banja Luka operated by Big Radio
- Big Radio 4 – Banja Luka operated by Big Radio
- Bobar Radio – Studio B2 – Bijeljina operated by Bobar Radio
- Daš Extra Radio – Bijeljina operated by Daš Radio
- Daš Radio – Bijeljina
- DiV Radio – Prijedor
- Drukčiji Radio – Novi Travnik
- Free Radio Prijedor – Prijedor operated by DiV Radio
- Hard Rock Radio – Banja Luka
- Hrvatski Radio Bobovac – Vareš
- K3 Radio Prnjavor – Prnjavor operated by TV K3
- Korona Radio 1 – Trebinje
- Korona Radio 2 – Trebinje operated by Korona Radio
- Narodni radio Sarajevo – Sarajevo operated by TNT Grupacija
- Narodni radio Šipovo – Šipovo
- Narodni radio Tuzla – Tuzla operated by TNT Grupacija
- Narodni radio Zenica – Zenica operated by TNT Grupacija
- Neovisni Radio Feral – Kalesija
- Novi Radio Bihać – Bihać
- Običan Radio – Mostar
- Sim Radio – Bijeljina
- Plavi FM – Banja Luka
- Pop FM – Banja Luka operated by Nezavisne novine
- PST radio – Kotor Varoš
- Radio 1503 Zavidovići – Zavidovići (also on AM frequency)
- Radio 303 – Rogatica
- Radio 8 – Sarajevo
- Radio Arena – Mostar
- Radio Avaz – Čelić
- Radio BA – Sarajevo
- Radio Best Šipovo – Šipovo
- Radio Bet Fratello – Gradačac
- Radio Birač – Milići
- Radio Breza – Breza
- Radio Dobre Vibracije – Mostar
- Radio Džungla – Doboj
- Radio Feniks – Kozarska Dubica
- Radio Glas Drine – Studio Onyx – Čelić operated by Radio Glas Drine
- Radio Glas Drine – Studio Sapna – Sapna operated by Radio Glas Drine
- Radio Glas Drine – Studio Srebrenica – Srebrenica operated by Radio Glas Drine
- Radio Grude – Grude
- Radio HIT Brčko – Brčko operated by RTV HIT Brčko
- Radio Kakanj – Kakanj
- Radio Kameleon – Tuzla
- Radio Kontakt – Banja Luka operated by RTV Kontakt
- Radio Kozara – Gradiška
- Radio Ljubić – Prnjavor
- Radio Magic – Milići
- Radio Maglaj – Maglaj operated by RTV Maglaj
- Radio Majevica – Lopare
- Radio MANGO – Livno
- Radio Miljacka operated by Radio 8
- Radio Oscar C – Mostar operated by HTV Oscar C
- Radio OSM – Istočno Sarajevo
- Radio Osvit – Zvornik
- Radio Padrino – Trebinje
- Radio Plus – Posušje
- Radio S1 – Sarajevo operated by Radio S
- Radio Sarajevo – Sarajevo
- Radio Skala – Ugljevik
- Radio Slobomir – Bijeljina operated by RTV Slobomir
- Radio Slon – Tuzla operated by RTV Slon
- Radio Studio 99 – Sarajevo operated by Al Jazeera Balkans
- Radio Studio D – Srebrenik operated by Tatabrada TV
- Radio Studio M – Teslić
- Radio Tešanj – Tešanj
- Radio TNT Sarajevo – Travnik operated by TNT Grupacija
- Radio TNT Travnik – Travnik operated by TNT Grupacija
- Radio TNT Tuzla – Tuzla operated by TNT Grupacija
- Radio TNT Zenica – Travnik operated by TNT Grupacija
- Radio Vikom – Gradiška
- Radio Velkaton – Velika Kladuša
- Radio UNO – Banja Luka
- Radio Zenit – Zenica
- Radio Zos – Tešanj
- RPŽ Radiopostaja Sarajevo – Sarajevo
- Studio 078 – Laktaši
- Šik Radio – Mrkonjić Grad
- Trend Radio – Velika Kladuša
- V.D. Vujke radio Šipovo – Šipovo

=== Nonprofit ===
- Radio Active – Zenica

== Internet radio ==
- Moj radio – Sarajevo operated by BH Telecom
- Radio USK 2 – Bihać operated by RTV USK
- Radio M Plus – Sarajevo operated by Radio M
- Imperia Radio – Sarajevo operated by Imperia TV
- Big Folk Radio – Banja Luka (Big Radio)
- Big Balade Radio – Banja Luka operated by Big Radio
- Big Rock Radio – Banja Luka operated by Big Radio
- Studentski eFM Radio – Sarajevo
- HP Radio – Sarajevo operated by Hayat TV
- Radio Nars – Srebrenik
- Radio Džungla 2 – Doboj operated by Radio Džungla
- Radio Džungla 3 – Doboj operated by Radio Džungla
- BBI Radio – Sarajevo operated by BBI Shopping center
- SCC Radio – Sarajevo operated by SCC Shopping center
- dress.FM – Sarajevo operated by New Yorker
- Šparkastični jukebox – Sarajevo operated by Sparkasse Bank BiH
- UniRadio – Sarajevo operated by UniCredit Bank

== Defunct radio ==
- HR Radiopostaja Mostar
- Radio Ritam Sarajevo
- Radio Ritam Banja Luka
- Radio Ritam Mostar
- Radio Ritam Zenica
- Radio Ritam Visoko
- Radio Vrhbosna
- Radio BM
- Radio Istočno Sarajevo
- Radio Hayat
- Radio Zid
- Radio Aktivan
- Radio Agape
- Radio Studio N
- Radio Bulevar
- Plavi radio Banja Luka
- Oksigen FM
- Vikom Radio
- Radio Soli
- Radio Vesta
- Radio 88 Mostar
- Bordo radio-Glas Bosne Sarajevo
- Radio 202 Sarajevo
- Radiopostaja Novi Travnik
- Zavičajni radio Breške
- Radio FERN

== Foreign radio services ==
List of foreign services/broadcaster that broadcast programs from or to Bosnia and Herzegovina audience:

- Radio Slobodna Evropa – daily news bulletins, morning and talk shows from Radio Free Europe/Radio Liberty broadcasts from Sarajevo via network of local Bosnian radio stations
- BFBS Radio 1 available in Sarajevo via FM, from Butmir Camp
- BFBS Radio 2 available in Sarajevo via FM, broadcasts from Butmir Camp
- BBC Minute – news bulletins from BBC World Service, available in English language on Antena Sarajevo
- Deutsche Welle/DW Radio – news and talk shows from DW-RADIO's Bosnian Service, also available on satellite or online as podcast in Bosnian language
- Vijesti Radija Vatikan – news and radio talk shows from Croatian services of Radio Vatican/Radio Vatikan broadcast from Vatican to listeners primarily in Croatia and Bosnia and Herzegovina via Radio Marija BiH
- IRIB – Bosanski radio program/IRIB World Service Bosnian – news and talk shows from IRIB World Service from Iran
- TRT Bosanski – news shows and talk programs from Voice of Turkey available online as podcasts or via satellite reception in Bosnian language
- Radio Television of Kosovo via Radio Kosovo 2 broadcasts daily and weekly news editions outputs in Bosnian language from Pristina
- Macedonian Radio Television broadcasts daily news programs in the Bosnian language via Radio Skopje 3
- Radio Forum – Das Südosteuropa-Magazin – daily radio news and talk show programs produced by Radio COSMO, German radio station intended for listeners in or from Southern Europe
- SBS Bosanski on SBS Radio 1 – Programs in Bosnian language produced by SBS Radio from Australia
- CHIN Radio/TV International – Radio show programs in Bosnian language from Toronto, Canada
- TWR-Bosnian – radio shows podcasts produced online by Trans World Radio in Bosnian language
- Red Bull Radio Show – Weekly music radio show from Red Bull Radio on local Radio Sarajevo 90,2

== Radio stations in Sarajevo ==
Analog radio stations in Sarajevo area
FM MHz	Name	RDS	Type	Headquarters	Owner	Transmitter
87.7	Nes radio	NES	Private	Banja Luka	Nezavisne novine	Sarajevo/Hum Tower (sar)
88.2	Radio Vogošća	VOGOSCA	Public	Vogošća	RTV Vogošća	Sarajevo/Grdonj (sar)
88.7	Radio Republike Srpske	RTRS-RRS	Public	Banja Luka	RTRS	Sarajevo/Trebević 2 (srp)
89.3	Federalni Radio	RADIO-F.	Public	Sarajevo	RTVFBiH	Vlašić (sbs)
89.7	Radio Ilijaš	ILIJAS	Public	Ilijaš	-	Ilijaš/Karašnica (sar)
89.9	Radio Ask	A S K	Private	Ilidža	-	Sarajevo/Grdonj (sar)
90.2	Radio Sarajevo	SARAJEVO	Private	Sarajevo	Radiosarajevo.ba	Sarajevo/Grdonj (sar)
90.5	Radio Mix	MIX	Private	Sarajevo	RSG Group	Sarajevo/Zmajevac-Sedrenik (sar)
90.9	Antena Sarajevo	ANTENA	Private	Sarajevo	RSG Group	Sarajevo/Grdonj (sar)
91.2	Radio Kalman	KALMAN	Private	Sarajevo	-	Konjic/Lisin (hgn)
91.5	Radio Kalman	KALMAN	Private	Sarajevo	-	Sarajevo/Grdonj (sar)
92.0	BN Radio	RTV BN	Private	Bijeljina	RTV BN	Sarajevo/Trebević 1 (srp)
92.7	Radio Kiss FM	KISS FM	Public	Kiseljak	-	Fojnica/Čubren (sbs)
93.2	BIG Radio 2	BIG	Private	Banja Luka	Radio BIG	Sarajevo/Trebević 2 (srp)
93.6	Radio OSM	O.S.M. R	Private	Istočno Sarajevo	-	Sarajevo/Trebević 2 (srp)
94.5	Federalni Radio	RADIO-F.	Public	Sarajevo	RTVFBiH	Konjic/Lisin (hgn)
95.0	Radio Konjic	R KONJIC	Public	Konjic	-	Konjic/Lisin (hgn)
95.2	Radio Miljacka	Miljacka	Private	Sarajevo	Radio 8	Sarajevo/Grdonj (sar)
95.7	Federalni Radio	RADIO-F.	Public	Sarajevo	RTVFBiH	Sarajevo/Hum (sar)
96.1	Radio Mir Međugorje	R MIR M	Nonprofit	Međugorje	-	Fojnica/Čubren (sbs)
96.1	Radio Crne Gore 1	RCG1	Public	Podgorica	RTCG	Žabljak/Durmitor-Štuoc (ZB)
96.5	Radio BIR	RADIOBIR	Private	Sarajevo	IZ BiH	Sarajevo/Grdonj (sar)
97.0	BH Radio 1	BHRADIO1	Public	Sarajevo	BHRT	Vlašić (sbs)
97.5	RSG Radio	RSG	Private	Sarajevo	RSG Group	Sarajevo/Grdonj (sar)
98.1	Radio Herceg-Bosne	RADIO-HB	Public	Mostar	RTVHB	Fojnica/Čubren (sbs)
98.4	Radio Otvorena mreža	OMREZA	Nonprofit	Sarajevo	-	Konjic/Lisin (hgn)
98.7	Radio M	RADIO M	Private	Sarajevo	-	Sarajevo/Trebević 2 (srp)
99.5	Federalni Radio	RADIO-F.	Public	Sarajevo	RTVFBiH	Goražde/Hadžića brdo (bpd)
99.8	Radio Studio 99	99	Private	Sarajevo	Al Jazeera Balkans	Sarajevo/Grdonj (sar)
100.3	BH Radio 1	BHRADIO1	Public	Sarajevo	BHRT	Konjic/Lisin (hgn)
101.3	Radio Kiss FM	KISS FM	Public	Kiseljak	-	Kiseljak (sbs)
101.7	BH Radio 1	BHRADIO1	Public	Sarajevo	BHRT	Sarajevo/Hum (sar)
102.0	BFBS Radio 1	noRDS	-	Sarajevo	-	Sarajevo/Butmir Camp (sar)
102.4	BN Radio	RTV BN	Private	Bijeljina	RTV BN	Vlašić 2 (sbs)
102.8	Bobar Radio	*BOBAR*	Private	Bijeljina	-	Sarajevo/Trebević 2 (srp)
103.3	Radio Marija	R.MARIJA	Nonprofit	Sarajevo	Radio Maria	Fojnica/Čubren (sbs)
103.7	BH Radio 1	BHRADIO1	Public	Sarajevo	BHRT	Sarajevo/Trebević 2 (srp)
104.3	RSG Radio	RSG	Private	Sarajevo	RSG Group	Konjic/Lisin (hgn)
104.7	Bobar Radio	*BOBAR*	Private	Bijeljina	-	Vlašić 2 (sbs)
104.9	Radio BA	RADIO BA	Private	Sarajevo	-	Sarajevo/Grdonj (sar)
105.2	Narodni Radio Sarajevo	NARODNI	Private	Sarajevo	-	Sarajevo/Trebević 2 (srp)
105.6	Radio IS	IS RADIO	Public	Sarajevo	-	Sarajevo/Trebević 2 (srp)
106.2	Radio Otvorena mreža	OMreza	Nonprofit	Sarajevo	-	Sarajevo/Grdonj (sar)
106.8	Radio 8	RADIO 8	Nonprofit	Sarajevo	Radio 8	Sarajevo/Grdonj (sar)
107.2	BFBS Radio 2	noRDS	-	Sarajevo	-	Sarajevo/Butmir Camp (sar)
107.2	RSG Radio	RSG	Private	Sarajevo	RSG Group	Fojnica/Čubren (sbs)
107.3	BH Radio 1	BHRADIO1	Public	Sarajevo	BHRT	Goražde/Hadžića brdo (bpd)

== See also ==
- Television in Bosnia and Herzegovina
- List of newspapers in Bosnia and Herzegovina
