= Radio Novi Grad =

Bosnian radio station

- Novi Grad; Bosnia and Herzegovina
- Broadcast area: Bosanska Krajina
- Frequency: Novi Grad 100.0 MHz
- Branding: Public

Programming
- Language: Serbian language
- Format: Local news, talk and music

Ownership
- Owner: JP "Radio Novi Grad"

History
- First air date: December 27, 1968
- Call sign meaning: NOVIGRAD

Technical information
- Transmitter coordinates: 45°02′53″N 16°22′37″E
- Repeater: Novi Grad/Vješala

Links
- Webcast: On website
- Website: www.radionovigrad.com

Radio Novi Grad (Serbian Cyrillic: Радио Нови Град) is a Bosnian local public radio station, broadcasting from Novi Grad, Republic of Srpska, Bosnia and Herzegovina.

== History ==
It was launched on 27 December 1968 as Radio Bosanski Novi by the municipal council of Bosanski Novi. In Yugoslavia and in SR Bosnia and Herzegovina, it was part of local/municipal Radio Sarajevo network affiliate. This radio station broadcasts a variety of programs such as local news, music, sport and talk shows. Nowadays, program is mainly produced in Serbian.

== Frequencies ==
Estimated number of listeners of Radio Novi Grad is around 13.956. Radiostation is also available in Una-Sana Canton and neighboring Croatia.

- Novi Grad 100.0 MHz

== See also ==
- List of radio stations in Bosnia and Herzegovina
