= Radiopostaja Čapljina =

Bosnian radio station

Radiopostaja Čapljina Radio Čapljina
Čapljina; Bosnia and Herzegovina
- Broadcast area: Herzegovina-Neretva Canton
- Frequency: Čapljina 91.3 MHz
- Branding: Public

Programming
- Language: Croatian
- Format: Local news, talk and music

Ownership
- Owner: Javno poduzeće "Radiopostaja Čapljina" d.o.o. Čapljina

History
- First air date: October 26, 1976
- Call sign meaning: CAPLJINA

Technical information
- Transmitter coordinates: 43°06′43″N 17°42′20″E
- Repeater: Čapljina/Crno brdo

Links
- Webcast: On website
- Website: www.radio-capljina.com

Radiopostaja Čapljina or Radio Čapljina is a Herzegovinan local public radio station, broadcasting from Čapljina, Bosnia and Herzegovina.

Estimated number of potential listeners is around 95,246.

Radio Čapljina was launched on 26 October 1976 by the municipal council of Čapljina. In Yugoslavia and in SR Bosnia and Herzegovina, it was part of the local/municipal Radio Sarajevo network affiliate. The radio station broadcasts a variety of programs such as music, local news and talk shows. The programs are mainly produced in Croatian. Due to the favorable geographical position in Herzegovina region, this radio station is also available in neighboring Croatia.

== Frequencies ==
- Čapljina 91.3 MHz

== See also ==
- List of radio stations in Bosnia and Herzegovina
