= Kalman Radio =

- Sarajevo; Bosnia and Herzegovina
- Frequency: Sarajevo 91.5 MHz

Programming
- Language: Bosnian language
- Format: Variety, folk music

Ownership
- Owner: "Kalman" d.o.o. Sarajevo

History
- First air date: April 1997

Technical information
- Transmitter coordinates: 43°52′N 18°25′E

Links
- Website: www.kalmanradio.ba

Kalman Radio is a Bosnian commercial radio station, broadcasting from Sarajevo.

Kalman Radio began broadcasting in April 1997. It was formatted as a variety radio station with Bosnian music, talk shows and short national news.

== Frequenciess ==
As of 2016, the program is broadcast at four frequencies: (Sarajevo 91.5 MHz, Central Bosnia 90.0 MHz, Mostar area 91.2 MHz, Tuzla area 107.8 MHz) and via Eutelsat W2 (16° E, 12640 MHz, V, S.R: 6.510, FEC 2/3).

== See also ==
- List of radio stations in Bosnia and Herzegovina
