= Radio Vitez =

Bosnian radio station

Vitez; Bosnia and Herzegovina
- Broadcast area: Central Bosnia Canton
- Frequency: Vitez 91.3 MHz
- Branding: Public

Programming
- Languages: Croatian; Bosnian
- Format: Local news, talk and music

Ownership
- Owner: JU Radio Vitez

History
- First air date: June 15, 1992
- Call sign meaning: RPVITEZ

Technical information
- Transmitter coordinates: 44°9.51′N 17°47.31′E
- Repeater: Vitez/Vitez

Links
- Webcast: On website
- Website: www.radiovitez.ba

Radio Vitez or Radio postaja Vitez is a Bosnian local public radio station, broadcasting from Vitez, Bosnia and Herzegovina.

Radio Vitez was launched on 15 June 1992. Program is mainly produced in Croatian and Bosnian. This radio station broadcasts a variety of programs such as music, local news and talk shows.

Estimated number of potential listeners is around 42,144.

== Frequencies ==
- Vitez 91.3 MHz

== See also ==
- List of radio stations in Bosnia and Herzegovina
- Radio Busovača
