= K3 Radio Prnjavor =

Bosnian radio station

Prnjavor; Bosnia and Herzegovina
- Frequency: See list
- RDS: K3 RADIO

Programming
- Language: Serbian
- Format: Local news, talk and music

Ownership
- Owner: Televizija K3 d.o.o. Prnjavor
- Sister stations: TV K3

History
- Founded: March 13, 2020

Technical information
- Licensing authority: CRA BiH
- Transmitter coordinates: 44°52′N 17°39′E
- Repeaters: Doboj/Ciganište-Becanj; Lopare/Zajednice; Istočno Sarajevo/Gavrića brdo-Ilinjača; Pale/Koran; Kotor Varoš/Ripište

Links
- Website: www.tvk3.info

K3 Radio Prnjavor or K3 Radio is a Bosnian local commercial radio station, broadcasting from Prnjavor, Bosnia and Herzegovina. This radio station broadcasts a variety of programs such as music and local news. The owner of the radio station is the company Televizija K3 d.o.o. Prnjavor which also operates television channel TV K3.

After BHRT has abandoned the launch of the BH Radio 2 program, reserved frequencies were allocated to other interested stations across Bosnia and Herzegovina through the competition where television TV K3 met the criteria for K3 Radio which was established in 2020.

Program of is mainly produced in Serbian language at 5 FM frequencies and it is available in the Prnjavor, Kotor Varoš, Lopare, Sarajevo and Istočno Sarajevo area.

== Frequencies ==
- Doboj 87.9 MHz
- Lopare 87.9 MHz
- Istočno Sarajevo 92.4 MHz
- Pale 92.4 MHz
- Banja Luka 95.6 MHz
- Kotor Varoš 103.6 MHz

== See also ==
- List of radio stations in Bosnia and Herzegovina
- Radio Prnjavor
- Radio Mix
- Radio Tuzla
- Radio Tešanj
