= Radio Ljubuški =

Bosnian radio station

Ljubuški; Bosnia and Herzegovina
- Broadcast area: West Herzegovina Canton
- Branding: Public

Programming
- Language: Croatian language
- Format: Local news, talk and music

Ownership
- Owner: JAVNO PODUZEĆE RADIO LJUBUŠKI d.o.o. Ljubuški

History
- First air date: April 29, 1992

Technical information
- Transmitter coordinates: 43°11′53″N 17°32′48″E

Links
- Webcast: On municipal website
- Website: www.radioljubuski.ba

Radio Ljubuški is a Hercegovina local public radio station, broadcasting from Ljubuški, Bosnia and Herzegovina.

Radio Ljubuški was launched on 29 April 1992.

== Frequencies ==
- Ljubuški 99.4 MHz

== See also ==
- List of radio stations in Bosnia and Herzegovina
