= Radio Oscar C =

Mostar; Bosnia and Herzegovina
- Broadcast area: Herzegovina-Neretva Canton

Programming
- Language: Croatian language
- Format: Urban music, entertainment, talk, news

Ownership
- Owner: Hrvatska televizija "Oscar - C" d.o.o. Mostar

History
- First air date: 2000

Technical information
- Transmitter coordinates: 43°20′N 17°48′E

Links
- Webcast: On website
- Website: oscarc.in

Radio Oscar C is a Herzegovina commercial radio station, broadcasting from Mostar, Bosnia and Herzegovina.

== Frequencies ==
The program is currently broadcast on 5 frequencies:

- Mostar 103.4 MHz
- Grude 88.5 MHz
- Međugorje 88.5 MHz
- Neum 91.2 MHz
- Stolac 93.4 MHz

== See also ==
- List of radio stations in Bosnia and Herzegovina
