= Radio Kupres =

Bosnian radio station

Radio Kupres Kupreški Radio
Kupres; Bosnia and Herzegovina
- Broadcast area: Canton 10
- Frequency: Kupres 90.5 MHz
- Branding: Public

Programming
- Language: Croatian
- Format: Local news, talk and music

Ownership
- Owner: Javno poduzeće " Radio Kupres" d.o.o. Kupres

History
- First air date: 1997
- Call sign meaning: KUPRESKI

Technical information
- Transmitter coordinates: 43°59′26″N 17°16′46″E
- Repeaters: Gornji Vakuf-Uskoplje/Zekina gruda Kupres/Stožer-Vrana; Travnik/Bukovica; Ivovik/Borova glava

Links
- Webcast: On website
- Website: www.kupreskiradio.com

Radio Kupres or Kupreški Radio is a Bosnian local public radio station, broadcasting from Kupres, Bosnia and Herzegovina.

Estimated number of potential listeners is around 184,416.

Radio Kupres was launched in 1997. Program is mainly produced in Croatian. This radio station broadcasts a variety of programs such as music, local news and talk shows. Due to the favorable geographical position in Canton 10 region, this radio station is also available in neighboring Croatia.

== Frequencies ==
The program is currently broadcast on 4 frequencies:

- Gornji Vakuf 89.7 MHz
- Kupres 90.5 MHz
- Travnik 90.5 MHz
- Ivovik/Borova glava 107.5 MHz

== See also ==
- List of radio stations in Bosnia and Herzegovina
