= Radio Station "Mir" Međugorje =

- Međugorje; Bosnia and Herzegovina

Programming
- Language: Croatian

History
- First air date: 25 November 1997; 28 years ago

Technical information
- Transmitter coordinates: 43°12′N 17°41′E

Links
- Website: radio-medjugorje.com

Radio Station "Mir" Međugorje (Croatian: Radiopostaja "Mir" Međugorje) is a Catholic radio station from Međugorje, Bosnia and Herzegovina. It is broadcast from several FM transmitters in its home country and Croatia.

== History ==
Radio station started with broadcasting on 25 November 1997. It has been created first and foremost in order to transmit the Prayer Programme from the Parish Church of Međugorje.

On 4 October 1999 it started broadcasting on the Internet.

== Frequencies ==
The program is currently broadcast at 14 frequencies:

- Banja Luka 87.8 MHz
- Jajce 87.8 MHz
- Fojnica 96.1 MHz
- Olovo 96.1 MHz
- Međugorje 98.3 MHz
- Mostar 100.0 MHz
- Nova Bila 100.0 MHz
- Žepče 100.1 MHz
- Zenica 100.1 MHz
- Herzegovina 101.5 MHz
- Bugojno 101.8 MHz
- Prozor 104.7 MHz
- Banja Luka 106.7 MHz
- Plješivica 107.8 MHz

== See also ==
- List of radio stations in Bosnia and Herzegovina
- Medjugorje International Youth Festival
- Radio Maria
