= Radio Otvorena mreža =

Radio Otvorena Mreža
- Sarajevo; Bosnia and Herzegovina
- Broadcast area: Bosnia and Herzegovina
- Frequencies: Sarajevo 106.2 MHz; Banja Luka 101.4 MHz; Srebrenica 105.6 MHz; Tuzla 102.1 MHz; Mostar 94.0 MHz; Jajce 98.3 MHz; Bihać 107.4 MHz; Konjic 98.4 MHz; Trebinje 106.4 MHz; Zenica 106.2 MHz
- Branding: Nonprofit

Programming
- Language: Bosnian language
- Format: Community radio, entertainment, talk, news

Ownership
- Owner: NVO Otvorena mreža Sarajevo

History
- First air date: February 2012
- Call sign meaning: RADIO OTVORENA MREZA

Technical information
- Transmitter coordinates: 43°52′N 18°25′E

Links
- Website: www.otvorenamreza.ba

Radio Otvorena Mreža or ROM is the first Bosnian nonprofit radio station, broadcasting from Sarajevo.

Radio Otvorena Mreža began broadcasting in February 2012.

== History and programming ==
As a community radio, station focuses on NGO news, contemporary pop music, talk shows and national news.

The holder of a broadcasting license for a non-profit community radio, Radio Otvorena Mreža is an association of citizens NGO Otvorena Mreža. Commonly called ROM, radio has a 9 transmitters and broadcasting stations across Bosnia and Herzegovina, which provides extensive local coverage. Radio also available via Internet, as well as through programs of partner radio stations in the region (cooperation with the Naxi radio from Belgrade, Radio Cafe 075 from Netherlands etc.).

Radio Otvorena Mreža together with TV Pink BH produces two TV shows, morning program Udri Muški and TV show about humanitarian actions in Bosnia and Herzegovina called "Hrabri ljudi".

TV shows Centralni Dnevnik hosted by Senad Hadžifejzović and Face to Face produced by Face TV from Sarajevo are also broadcast on this radio.

== Frequencies ==
The program is currently broadcast at 10 frequencies:

- Sarajevo 106.2 MHz
- Banja Luka 101.4 MHz
- Srebrenica 105.6 MHz
- Tuzla 102.1 MHz
- Mostar 94.0 MHz
- Jajce 98.3 MHz
- Bihać 107.4 MHz
- Konjic 98.4 MHz
- Trebinje 106.4 MHz
- Zenica 106.2 MHz

== See also ==
- List of radio stations in Bosnia and Herzegovina
