= Radio Dobre Vibracije =

Mostar; Bosnia and Herzegovina
- Broadcast area: Herzegovina-Neretva Canton

Programming
- Language: Croatian language
- Format: Urban music, entertainment, talk, news

Ownership
- Owner: "Radio Dobre Vibracije" d.o.o. Mostar

History
- First air date: 16 December 1996

Technical information
- Transmitter coordinates: 43°20′N 17°48′E

Links
- Webcast: On website
- Website: www.rdv.ba

Radio Dobre Vibracije (Croatian for "good vibes") is a Herzegovinian commercial radio station, broadcasting from Mostar, Bosnia and Herzegovina.

Radio Dobre Vibracije was launched on 16 December 1996.

== Frequencies ==
The program is currently broadcast at 4 frequencies:

- Mostar 96.2 MHz
- Čapljina 106.3 MHz
- Drežnica 106.3 MHz
- Grude 106.8 MHz

== See also ==
- List of radio stations in Bosnia and Herzegovina
