= Radio Studio 99 =

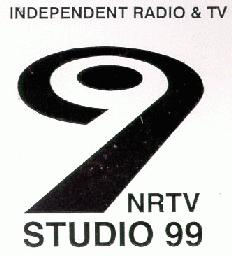
- Sarajevo; Bosnia and Herzegovina
- Broadcast area: Sarajevo Canton
- Frequency: Sarajevo 99.8 MHz

Programming
- Language: Bosnian language
- Format: News radio

Ownership
- Owner: Al Jazeera Balkans

History
- Call sign meaning: RADIO STUDIO 99

Technical information
- Transmitter coordinates: 43°52′N 18°25′E

Links
- Webcast: On website
- Website: balkans.aljazeera.net

Radio Studio 99 was a Bosnian commercial radio station, broadcasting from Sarajevo, Bosnia and Herzegovina. It was founded by Adil Kulenović and Zoran Ilić.

Radio Studio 99 broadcasts news and talk show programs from the parent TV channels Al Jazeera Balkans. The program was broadcast at one frequency (Sarajevo 99.8 MHz), and estimated number of potential listeners was around 443,685. Independent Radio Studio 99 was owned by the Al Jazeera Balkans.

== Frequencies ==
The program is currently broadcast on 2 frequencies:

- Sarajevo 99.8 MHz
- Fojnica 99.0 MHz

== See also ==
- List of radio stations in Bosnia and Herzegovina
