= Radio Foča =

Bosnian radio station

Radio Foča Радио Фоча
Foča; Bosnia and Herzegovina
- Broadcast area: Foča
- Frequency: Foča 92.5 MHz
- Branding: Public

Programming
- Language: Serbian language
- Format: Local news, talk and music

Ownership
- Owner: Centar za kulturu i informisanje sa p.o. Foča

History
- First air date: November 26, 1976
- Call sign meaning: -

Technical information
- Transmitter coordinates: 43°30′23″N 18°46′29″E
- Repeater: Foča/Kmur

Links
- Webcast: On website
- Website: www.radiofoca.com

Radio Foča or Радио Фоча is a Bosnian local public radio station, broadcasting from Foča, Bosnia and Herzegovina.

It was launched on 26 November 1976 by the municipal council of Foča. In Yugoslavia and in SR Bosnia and Herzegovina, it was part of local/municipal Radio Sarajevo network affiliate. This radio station broadcasts a variety of programs such as music, sport, local news and talk shows. Program is mainly produced in Serbian language.

Estimated number of potential listeners of Radio Foča is around 24,758. Radiostation is also available in municipalities of Bosnian-Podrinje Canton Goražde.

== Frequencies ==
- Foča 92.5 MHz

== See also ==
- List of radio stations in Bosnia and Herzegovina
