= Radio BA =

Radio station in Sarajevo

Sarajevo; Bosnia and Herzegovina
- Broadcast area: Sarajevo
- Frequency: Sarajevo 104.9 MHz

Programming
- Language: Bosnian
- Format: Contemporary hit radio, entertainment, talk, news

Ownership
- Owner: "RTV BA" d.o.o. Sarajevo

History
- First air date: 2009
- Call sign meaning: RADIO BA

Technical information
- Transmitter coordinates: 43°52′N 18°25′E

Links
- Webcast: On website
- Website: www.radioba.ba

Radio BA is a Bosnian commercial radio station, broadcasting from Sarajevo.

Radio BA was founded during 2009 and the station focuses on contemporary pop music, entertainment and local news. The program is currently broadcast at one frequency (Sarajevo 104.9 MHz), estimated number of potential listeners is around 443,685.

== Frequencies ==
- Sarajevo 104.9 MHz

== See also ==
- List of radio stations in Bosnia and Herzegovina
