= Običan Radio =

Mostar; Bosnia and Herzegovina
- Broadcast area: Herzegovina-Neretva Canton

Programming
- Language: Croatian language
- Format: Urban music, entertainment, talk, news

Ownership
- Owner: "Običan radio" d.o.o. Mostar

History
- First air date: 25 March 2002

Technical information
- Transmitter coordinates: 43°20′N 17°48′E

Links
- Webcast: On website
- Website: obican.info

Običan Radio is a Hercegovina commercial radio station, broadcasting from Mostar, Bosnia and Herzegovina.

Običan Radio was launched on 25 March 2002.

== Frequencies ==
The program is currently broadcast at 2 frequencies:

- Mostar 106.5 MHz
- Stolac 105.3 MHz

== See also ==
- List of radio stations in Bosnia and Herzegovina
