= Radio Donji Vakuf =

Bosnian radio station

Donji Vakuf; Bosnia and Herzegovina
- Broadcast area: Central Bosnia Canton
- Frequency: Donji Vakuf 88.0 MHz
- Branding: Public

Programming
- Language: Bosnian language
- Format: Local news, talk and music

Ownership
- Owner: Javna ustanova Centar za kulturu, informisanje i sport Donji Vakuf

History
- First air date: November 16, 1975
- Call sign meaning: D.Vakuf

Technical information
- Transmitter coordinates: 44°09′N 17°24′E
- Repeater: Donji Vakuf/Urija

Links
- Webcast: On website
- Website: www.radiodonjivakuf.com.ba

Radio Donji Vakuf is a Bosnian local public radio station, broadcasting from Donji Vakuf, Bosnia and Herzegovina.

Radio Donji Vakuf was launched on 16 September 1978 by the municipal council of Donji Vakuf. In Yugoslavia and in SR Bosnia and Herzegovina, it was part of local/municipal Radio Sarajevo network affiliate. This radio station broadcasts a variety of programs such as music, sport, local news and talk shows. Program is mainly produced in Bosnian language.

Estimated number of potential listeners of Radio Donji Vakuf is around 17,499.

== Frequencies ==
- Donji Vakuf 88.0 MHz

== See also ==
- List of radio stations in Bosnia and Herzegovina
