= Kiss FM (Bosnia and Herzegovina) =

Bosnian radio station

- Sarajevo; Bosnia and Herzegovina
- Broadcast area: Central Bosnia, Kanton Sarajevo,Hercegovačko-neretvanski kanton, Ze-Do Kanton
- Frequencies: 92.7 Sarajevo,Kiseljak, Jablanici ; 93.8 Vitez, Travnik,Zenica ;103.4 Bugojno, Konjic, Gornji Vakuf, 92.1 Kanjon Neretve, Mostar, Široki, Čapljina, Čitluk, 95.9 Žepče, Zavidovici, Maglaj, Doboj

Programming
- Language: Bosnian
- Format: Contemporary hit radio

Ownership
- Owner: Stanić MEDIA d.o.o., Sarajevo

History
- First air date: 7 December 2017

Technical information
- Transmitter coordinates: 43°56′35″N 18°04′39″E

Links
- Website: www.kissfm.ba

Kiss FM or Radio Kiss is a Bosnian commercial radio station, broadcasting from Sarajevo, Bosnia and Herzegovina.

The station focuses on contemporary pop music. Until 7 December 2017.

Four internet radio stations Kiss PARTY, Kiss Dance, Kiss Love and Kiss Cafe are also part of company.

== Frequencies ==
The program is currently broadcast at 4 frequencies in Central Bosnia:

- Sarajevo 92.7 MHz
- Kiseljak 92.7 MHz
- Zenica, Vitez, Travnik 93.8 MHz
- Gornji Vakuf, Bugojno 103.4 MHz
- Mostar 92.1 MHz
- Žepče, Zavidovi, Maglaj, Doboj 95.9

== See also ==
- List of radio stations in Bosnia and Herzegovina
