= Radio Slobomir =

Bosnian radio station

Bijeljina; Bosnia and Herzegovina
- Broadcast area: Semberija; Bosansko Podrinje
- Frequencies: Bijeljina 88.4 MHz; Doboj 89.8 MHz; Majevica 96.3 MHz; Zvornik 98.3 MHz; Vlasenica 101.8 MHz
- RDS: SLOBOMIR

Programming
- Language: Serbian
- Format: Local news, talk and music

Ownership
- Owner: RADIO TELEVIZIJA SLOBOMIR D.o.o. Slobomir
- Sister stations: RTV Slobomir

History
- Founded: 2005
- Last air date: 29 maj 2024

Technical information
- Licensing authority: CRA BiH
- Transmitter coordinates: 44°45′25″N 19°12′58″E
- Repeaters: Bijeljina/Silos; Doboj/Čajre-Avdićevo brdo Majevica/Udrigovo; Zvornik/Vratolomac; Vlasenica/Karanfilica

Links
- Webcast: Listen Live
- Website: www.rtvslobomir.com

Radio Slobomir She was Bosnian local commercial radio station, broadcasting from Bijeljina, Bosnia and Herzegovina. This radio station broadcasts a variety of programs such as popular pop and folk music with local news.

The program is mainly produced in Serbian at five FM frequencies and it is available in the city of Bijeljina as well as in nearby municipalities in Semberija
Bosansko Podrinje area.

The owner of the local radio station is the company RADIO TELEVIZIJA SLOBOMIR D.o.o. Slobomir which also operates RTV Slobomir.

Estimated number of listeners of Radio Slobomir is around 268.917.

== Frequencies ==
- Bijeljina 88.4 MHz
- Doboj 89.8 MHz
- Majevica 96.3 MHz
- Zvornik 98.3 MHz
- Vlasenica 101.8 MHz

== See also ==
- List of radio stations in Bosnia and Herzegovina
- Daš Radio
- Daš Extra Radio
- BN Radio
- Bobar Radio
- Bobar Radio - Studio B2
- RSG Radio
