= Radio IS =

Bosnian radio station

Radio IS Радио ИС
- Istočno Sarajevo; Bosnia and Herzegovina
- Broadcast area: Republika Srpska
- Branding: Public

Programming
- Language: Serbian language
- Format: Local news, talk and music

Ownership
- Owner: JP Gradski radio d.o.o.

History
- First air date: 2017

Technical information
- Transmitter coordinates: 43°49′N 18°21′E

Links
- Webcast: On website
- Website: is-radio.com

Radio IS or Радио ИС is a Bosnian local public radio station, broadcasting from Istočno Sarajevo, Bosnia and Herzegovina.

Radio IS was launched in 2017.

== History ==
Radio IS initially distributed its programme via the internet. In February 2020, it received a licence for terrestrial broadcasting. The station’s programming is intended for the six municipalities that make up the City of Istočno Sarajevo. In 2019, JP Gradski radio employed six people and was financed mainly through the city and municipal budgets, alongside commercial revenue. In January 2020, the company became the owner of OSM Television following a purchase approved by the City Assembly in 2019.

== Frequencies ==
The program is currently broadcast at 2 frequencies:

- Sarajevo 105.6 MHz
- Sokolac 88.3 MHz

== See also ==
- List of radio stations in Bosnia and Herzegovina
