= Radio ASK =

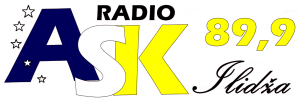
- Ilidža; Bosnia and Herzegovina
- Broadcast area: Sarajevo Canton
- Frequency: Sarajevo 89.9 MHz

Programming
- Language: Bosnian language
- Format: Contemporary hit radio, local news

Ownership
- Owner: Radio studio "Ask" d.o.o. Ilidža

History
- First air date: 24 May 1994 (as T91ASK)
- Former call signs: T91ASK
- Call sign meaning: RADIO ASK

Technical information
- Transmitter coordinates: 43°49′N 18°18′E

Links
- Website: www.radioask.co.ba

Radio ASK is a Bosnian commercial radio station, broadcasting from Ilidža, near Sarajevo.

The program is currently broadcast at one frequency (Sarajevo 89.9 MHz) and the station focuses on contemporary music, talk shows and local news.

Radio Ask was founded on 25 May 1994 (During Bosnian war and Siege of Sarajevo).

== Frequencies ==
- Sarajevo 89.9 MHz

== See also ==
- List of radio stations in Bosnia and Herzegovina
