= Radio Brod =

Bosnian radio station

Radio Brod Радио Брод
Brod; Bosnia and Herzegovina
- Broadcast area: Brod, Bosnia and Herzegovina
- Frequency: Brod 92.2 MHz
- Branding: Public

Programming
- Language: Serbian
- Format: Local news, talk and music

Ownership
- Owner: Javno preduzeće "RADIO BROD" d.o.o. Brod

History
- Call sign meaning: RS BROD

Technical information
- Transmitter coordinates: 45°08′N 17°59′E
- Repeater: Ulica Svetog Save C 50, Brod

Links
- Webcast: On website
- Website: www.opstina-brod.net

Radio Brod (Serbian Cyrillic: Радио Брод) is a Bosnian local public radio station, broadcasting from Brod, Bosnia and Herzegovina.

The program is mainly produced in Serbian from 7 am to 6 pm. The estimated number of potential listeners of Radio Brod is around 33,924. The radio station is also available in neighboring Croatia.

== Frequencies ==
- Brod 88.1 MHz

== See also ==
- List of radio stations in Bosnia and Herzegovina
