= Radio Plus (Bosnia and Herzegovina) =

Posušje; Bosnia and Herzegovina
- Broadcast area: West Herzegovina Canton

Programming
- Language: Croatian language
- Format: Urban music, entertainment, talk, news

Ownership
- Owner: Kreativni mediji d.o.o. Posušje

History
- First air date: 2007

Technical information
- Transmitter coordinates: 43°28′19″N 17°19′47″E

Links
- Webcast: On website
- Website: www.radioplus.ba

Radio Plus is a Hercegovina commercial radio station, broadcasting from Posušje, Bosnia and Herzegovina.

Radio Plus was launched in 2007.

== Frequencies ==
- Posušje 90.3 MHz

== See also ==
- List of radio stations in Bosnia and Herzegovina
