= Radio 8 =

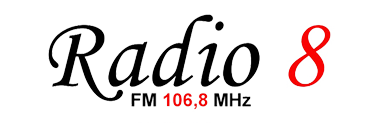

Sarajevo; Bosnia and Herzegovina
- Broadcast area: Sarajevo Canton
- Frequency: Sarajevo 106.8 MHz

Programming
- Language: Bosnian language
- Format: Urban music, entertainment, talk, news

Ownership
- Owner: "Radio televizija 8" d.o.o. Sarajevo

History
- Call sign meaning: RADIO 8 SARAJEVO

Technical information
- Transmitter coordinates: 43°52′N 18°25′E

Links
- Webcast: On website
- Website: www.radio8.ba

Radio 8 is a Bosnian commercial radio station, broadcasting from Sarajevo, Bosnia and Herzegovina.

Radio 8 focuses on urban music, entertainment shows and local news. The program is currently broadcast at one frequency (Sarajevo 106.8 MHz), estimated number of potential listeners is around 443,685.

== Frequencies ==
- Sarajevo 106.8 MHz

== See also ==
- List of radio stations in Bosnia and Herzegovina
