= Radio Tomislavgrad =

Bosnian and Herzegovinian radio station

Tomislavgrad; Bosnia and Herzegovina
- Broadcast area: Herzeg-Bosnian Canton
- Frequencies: Tomislavgrad 95.1 MHz, 95.9 MHz
- Branding: Public

Programming
- Language: Croatian
- Format: Local news, talk and music

Ownership
- Owner: Javno poduzeće Radio Tomislavgrad d.o.o. Tomislavgrad

History
- First air date: May 18, 1992
- Call sign meaning: RADIO TG

Technical information
- Transmitter coordinates: 43°43′N 17°14′E
- Repeaters: Tomislavgrad/Rudine; Livno/Tušnica

Links
- Webcast: On website
- Website: www.radiotg.com

Radio Tomislavgrad is a Bosnian and Herzegovinian local public radio station, broadcasting from Tomislavgrad, Bosnia and Herzegovina.

Estimated number of potential listeners is around 68,409.

Radio Tomislavgrad was launched during Bosnian War on 18 May 1992 as local/municipal service. Program is mainly produced in Croatian. This radio station broadcasts a variety of programs such as music, local news and talk shows. Due to the favorable geographical position in West Herzegovina and Duvanjsko Polje region, this radiostation is also available in neighboring Croatia.

== Frequencies ==
The program is currently broadcast on 5 frequencies:

- Tomislavgrad 95.1 MHz
- Tomislavgrad 95.9 MHz
- Olovo - Kupres 98.3 MHz
- Livno 103.3 MHz
- Bosansko Grahovo 105.8 MHz

== See also ==
- List of radio stations in Bosnia and Herzegovina
