= Radio Prnjavor =

Bosnian radio station

Radio Prnjavor Радио Прњавор
Prnjavor; Bosnia and Herzegovina
- Broadcast area: Prnjavor
- Frequency: Prnjavor 99.1 MHz
- Branding: Public

Programming
- Language: Serbian language
- Format: Local news, talk and music

Ownership
- Owner: JP Radio Prnjavor

History
- First air date: March 6, 1984

Technical information
- Transmitter coordinates: 44°52′N 17°39′E
- Repeater: Prnjavor/Ljubić-Svinjar

Links
- Webcast: On website
- Website: www.prnjavorlive.info

Radio Prnjavor or Радио Прњавор is a Bosnian local public radio station, broadcasting from Prnjavor, Bosnia and Herzegovina.

It was launched on 6 March 1984 by the municipal council of Prnjavor. In Yugoslavia and in SR Bosnia and Herzegovina, it was part of local/municipal Radio Sarajevo network affiliate. This radio station broadcasts a variety of programs such as news, music, morning and talk shows. Program is mainly produced in Serbian language from 07:00 to 19:00.

Estimated number of potential listeners of Radio Prnjavor is around 81,685. Radiostation is also available in municipalities of Zenica-Doboj Canton and in Bosanska Posavina area.

== Frequencies ==
- Prnjavor 99.1 MHz

== See also ==
- List of radio stations in Bosnia and Herzegovina
