= Radio Livno =

Bosnian radio station

Livno; Bosnia and Herzegovina
- Broadcast area: Canton 10
- Frequency: Livno 91.5 MHz
- Branding: Public

Programming
- Language: Croatian language
- Format: Local news, talk and music

Ownership
- Owner: JP "RTV Livno" d.o.o. Livno

History
- First air date: May 24, 1980
- Call sign meaning: LIVNO1FM

Technical information
- Transmitter coordinates: 43°49′31″N 17°00′21″E
- Repeaters: Livno/Kula; Livno/Borova Glava; Livno/Batinića brdo

Links
- Webcast: On website
- Website: www.radiolivno.ba

Radio Livno is a Bosnian local public radio station, broadcasting from Livno, Bosnia and Herzegovina.

The estimated number of potential listeners is around 59,480.

Radio Livno was launched on 24 May 1980 by the municipal council of Livno. In Yugoslavia and in SR Bosnia and Herzegovina, it was a local/municipal Radio Sarajevo network affiliate. Radio Livno's programs are mainly produced in Croatian. This radio station broadcasts a variety of programs such as music, local news, and talk shows. Due to its favorable geographical position in the Canton 10 region, this radio station is also available in neighboring Croatia.

== Frequencies ==
The program is currently broadcast at 3 frequencies:

- Livno and Bosansko Grahovo 91.5 MHz
- Ivovik - Tomislavgrad, Šujica, Kupres, Glamoč 100.4 MHz
- Livno - Batinića brdo 100.9 MHz

== See also ==
- List of radio stations in Bosnia and Herzegovina
