= Radio Kostajnica =

Bosnian radio station

Radio Kostajnica Радио Костајница
- Kostajnica/Bosanska Kostajnica; Bosnia and Herzegovina
- Broadcast area: Kostajnica/Bosanska Kostajnica
- Frequency: Kostajnica/Bosanska Kostajnica 101.6 MHz
- Branding: Public

Programming
- Language: Serbian language
- Format: Local news, talk and music

Ownership
- Owner: JP "Radio Kostajnica" sa p.o. Kostajnica

History
- First air date: 1995

Technical information
- Transmitter coordinates: 45°13′N 16°32′E
- Repeater: Kostajnica/Alaginci

Links
- Webcast: On website
- Website: www.radiokostajnica.com

Radio Kostajnica is a local Bosnian radio station, broadcasting from Kostajnica, Bosnia and Herzegovina. It was launched in 1995 by JP Radio Kostajnica. The radio station broadcasts a variety of programs, such as music, local news, and talk shows.

The program is mainly produced in Serbian, from 08:00 to 16:00h. The estimated number of listeners of Radio Kostajnica is around 10,361. The radiostation is also available in the municipalities of Bosanska Krajina and in neighboring Croatia.

== Frequencies ==
- Kostajnica/Bosanska Kostajnica 101.6 MHz

== See also ==
- List of radio stations in Bosnia and Herzegovina
