= Radio Tuzla =

Bosnian radio station

- Tuzla; Bosnia and Herzegovina
- Broadcast area: Tuzla Canton
- Frequencies: Tuzla 88.0 MHz; Tuzla 94.0 MHz; Gračanica 105.1 MHz
- Branding: Public

Programming
- Language: Bosnian language
- Format: Local news, talk and music

Ownership
- Owner: JP RTV 7 d.o.o. Tuzla
- Sister stations: TV 7 Tuzla

History
- First air date: May 1, 1953
- Former call signs: RADIO 7

Technical information
- Transmitter coordinates: 44°32′17″N 18°40′34″E
- Repeaters: Tuzla/Tuzla; Tuzla/Ilinčica; Gračanica/Hotilj

Links
- Webcast: On website
- Website: www.rtv7.ba

Radio Tuzla is a Bosnian local public radio station, broadcasting from Tuzla, Bosnia and Herzegovina. This radio station broadcasts a variety of programs such as news, music, morning and talk shows. Program is mainly produced in Bosnian language.

Estimated number of potential listeners of Radio Tuzla in Tuzla Canton area is around 211.782. Radio station is also available in municipalities of Zenica-Doboj Canton, Brčko District and in Bosanska Posavina.

== History ==
Radio Tuzla was launched on 1 May 1953 by the municipal council of Tuzla, as first local radio station in SR Bosnia and Herzegovina, Yugoslavia.

As the first local radio station in Bosnia and Herzegovina, Radio Tuzla was part of local/municipal Radio Sarajevo network affiliate from 1953 until 1992 when war in Bosnia and Herzegovina started.

During the war, with the establishment of the new national public service broadcaster RTVBiH - Radio BiH (now BHRT - BH Radio 1) radio stations from the former Radio Sarajevo 2 local network generally continued to operate as local public radio stations under the jurisdiction of local authorities in Bosnia and Herzegovina (municipalities, cantons).

For Tuzla Canton, on February 20, 1993 Radio Tuzlanskog Kantona was established as regional radio network by RTV TK.

Radio Tuzla operated under its own name from 1953 to 2011.

JP RTV 7 d.o.o. Tuzla was created by the Conclusion of the Municipal Council of Tuzla, which, at its session on 31 May 2011 adopted the Study on further development and expansion of the activities of JP Radio Tuzla and passed the Decision on changing the name of the company to JP RTV 7 d.o.o. Tuzla, which is the legal successor and heir of the tradition and brand of Radio Tuzla, but also the heir of all financial and other difficulties that threatened the survival of Radio Tuzla in those years.

This opportunity was used by the local commercial station Radio Vesta, which, on September 25, 2017, changed its name to Radio Tuzla on its website and in all CRA BiH permit registers without any announcement. The slogan "Radio Tuzla - Staro ime, novi zvuk" (Radio Tuzla - Old name, new sound) provoked fierce reactions from the public company RTV 7.

Broadcasting along with public radio station Radio 7, commercial Radio Vesta used the name of Radio Tuzla from 2017 to 2019 when it changed owners.

The new owner, the TNT Grupacija from Travnik, returned the brand "Radio Tuzla" to the city of Tuzla (public company RTV 7 Tuzla - Radio 7).

At the same time, TNT Grupacija launched commercial Radio TNT Tuzla on the frequency of ex Radio Vesta (91.2).

== Frequencies ==
The program is currently broadcast at 3 frequencies:

- Tuzla 88.0 MHz
- Tuzla 94.0 MHz
- Gračanica 105.1 MHz

== See also ==
- List of radio stations in Bosnia and Herzegovina
- Radio Gračanica
- Radio TNT Tuzla
