= Radio Drvar =

Bosnian radio station

Drvar; Bosnia and Herzegovina
- Broadcast area: Drvar
- Frequency: Drvar 89.5 MHz
- Branding: Public

Programming
- Languages: Serbian; Croatian
- Format: Local news, talk and music

Ownership
- Owner: JP "Radio Drvar" d.o.o. Drvar

History
- First air date: 1992

Technical information
- Transmitter coordinates: 44°22′N 16°23′E
- Repeater: Drvar/Velika Visoka

Links
- Webcast: On municipal website
- Website: www.opstinadrvar.net

Radio Drvar is a Bosnian local public radio station, broadcasting from Drvar, Bosnia and Herzegovina.

This radio station broadcasts a variety of programs such as local news and talk shows. The program is mainly produced in Serbian.

Estimated number of potential listeners of Radio Drvar is around 6,220. Radiostation is also available in municipalities of Canton 10.

== Frequencies ==
- Drvar 89.5 MHz

== See also ==
- Radio Slobodni Drvar
- List of radio stations in Bosnia and Herzegovina
