= Radio Posušje =

Bosnian radio station

Posušje; Bosnia and Herzegovina
- Broadcast area: West Herzegovina Canton
- Branding: Public

Programming
- Language: Croatian language
- Format: Local news, talk and music

Ownership
- Owner: J.P. " Radio Posušje" d.o.o.

History
- First air date: 1984
- Call sign meaning: POSUSJE

Technical information
- Transmitter coordinates: 43°28′19.17″N 17°19′46.79″E

Links
- Webcast: On municipal website
- Website: www.radioposusje.ba

Radio Posušje is a Hercegovina local public radio station, broadcasting from Posušje, Bosnia and Herzegovina.

Radio Posušje was launched in 1984.

== Frequencies ==
The program is currently broadcast on 4 frequencies:

- Posušje 102.9 MHz
- Rakitno 102.9 MHz
- Blidinje 102.9 MHz
- Mostar 102.9 MHz

== See also ==
- List of radio stations in Bosnia and Herzegovina
