= Radio Ključ =

Bosnian radio station

Ključ; Bosnia and Herzegovina
- Broadcast area: Una-Sana Canton
- Frequency: 94.3 MHz
- Branding: Public

Programming
- Language: Bosnian language
- Format: Local news, talk and music

Ownership
- Owner: Javno preduzeće "RADIO KLJUČ" d.o.o. Ključ

History
- First air date: May 7, 1970

Technical information
- Transmitter coordinates: 44°32′N 16°46′E
- Repeaters: Ključ/Lubica; Ključ/Ramićki Kamen

Links
- Webcast: on website
- Website: www.media-kljuc.ba

Radio Ključ is a Bosnian local public radio station, broadcasting from Ključ, Una-Sana Canton.

It was launched on 7 May 1970 by the municipal council of Ključ. This radio station broadcasts a variety of programs such as music, local news, talk shows, and sport. The program is mainly produced in Bosnian.

The estimated number of potential listeners of Radio Ključ is around 31,630.

== Frequencies ==
The program is currently broadcast at 2 frequencies:

- Ključ, Una-Sana Canton 94.3 MHz
- Ključ, Una-Sana Canton 99.1 MHz

== See also ==
- List of radio stations in Bosnia and Herzegovina
