= Radio Konjic =

Bosnian radio station

Konjic; Bosnia and Herzegovina
- Broadcast area: Herzegovina-Neretva Canton
- Frequencies: Konjic 92.3 MHz; Konjic 95.0 MHz
- Branding: Public

Programming
- Language: Bosnian language
- Format: Local news, talk and music

Ownership
- Owner: Radio-televizija d.o.o. Konjic

History
- First air date: April 4, 1992
- Call sign meaning: R KONJIC

Technical information
- Transmitter coordinates: 43°39′15.9″N 17°57′38.8″E
- Repeaters: Konjic/Repovica; Konjic/Lisin

Links
- Webcast: www.myradiostream.com/radiokonjic

Radio Konjic is a Bosnian local public radio station, broadcasting from Konjic, Bosnia and Herzegovina.

It was launched on 4 April 1992 by Radio-televizija d.o.o. Konjic . This radio station broadcasts a variety of programs such as music, talk shows and local news. Program is mainly produced in Bosnian language. Estimated number of potential listeners of Radio Konjic is around 31.412

The radio station is also available in municipalities Jablanica, Prozor and Hadžići. Program is available via IPTV platform Moja TV (Channel 244) for listeners in BiH and in diaspora.

== Frequencies ==
The program is currently broadcast at 2 frequencies in Herzegovina-Neretva Canton.

- Konjic 92.3 MHz
- Konjic 95.0 MHz

== See also ==
- List of radio stations in Bosnia and Herzegovina
