= Radio Široki Brijeg =

Radio station

Programming
- Language: Croatian

History
- First air date: 10 April 1992; 33 years ago

Technical information
- Transmitter coordinates: 43°22′59.31″N 17°35′33.86″E

Links
- Website: www.radiosirokibrijeg.com

Radio Široki Brijeg or Radio postaja Široki Brijeg is a radio station, broadcasting from Široki Brijeg, Bosnia and Herzegovina on frequencies 92.7, 93.1 and 102.3 MHz. It serves the West Herzegovina Canton, Herzegovina-Neretva Canton and West Bosnia Canton.

It was founded on April 10, 1992. The station broadcasts from the Dom kulture (Cultural Home) at Gojko Šušak Square.

== Staff ==
- Director: Mario Marušić
- Editor in chief: Mario Marušić
- Reporters: Marinko Mikulić, Marinko Karačić
- Musical and technical: Valentino Zeljko, Predrag Rotim, Mario Naletilić
- Marketing: Mirjana Kožul

== See also ==
- List of radio stations in Bosnia and Herzegovina
