= Radio Kladanj =

Bosnian radio station

Kladanj; Bosnia and Herzegovina
- Broadcast area: Tuzla Canton
- Frequency: Kladanj 98.6 MHz
- Branding: Public

Programming
- Language: Bosnian language
- Format: Local news, talk and music

Ownership
- Owner: JU "IKC" Kladanj, Kladanj

History
- First air date: May 8, 1992

Technical information
- Transmitter coordinates: 44°13′N 18°41′E
- Repeater: Kladanj/Bratilo (tuz)

Links
- Webcast: On website
- Website: www.uzivoradio.com/kladanj.html

Radio Kladanj is a Bosnian local public radio station, broadcasting from Kladanj, Bosnia and Herzegovina.

It was launched on 8 May 1992 by JU "IKC" Kladanj, Kladanj. This radio station broadcasts a variety of programs such as music, talk shows and local news.

Program is mainly produced in Bosnian language. Estimated number of potential listeners of Radio Kladanj is around 72.767.

== Frequencies ==
- Kladanj 98.6 MHz

== See also ==
- List of radio stations in Bosnia and Herzegovina
