= Radio Višegrad =

Bosnian radio station

Radio Višegrad Радио Вишеград
Višegrad; Bosnia and Herzegovina
- Broadcast area: Podrinje
- Frequency: Višegrad 104.0 MHz
- Branding: Public

Programming
- Language: Serbian language
- Format: Local news, talk and music

Ownership
- Owner: JP "Radio-televizija Višegrad" d.o.o.

History
- First air date: April 7, 1992

Technical information
- Transmitter coordinates: 43°46′58″N 19°17′28″E
- Repeater: Višegrad/Mirilovići

Links
- Webcast: Online

Radio Višegrad or Радио Вишеград is a Bosnian local public radio station, broadcasting from Višegrad, Bosnia and Herzegovina.

It was launched on 7 April 1992 as local/municipal radio station. Radio station broadcasts a variety of programs such as local news, music, sport and talk shows.

Program is mainly produced in Serbian language, from 09:00 to 18:00, except Sunday.

Estimated number of potential listeners of Radio Višegrad is around 9.645. Radiostation is also available in municipalities of Podrinje area and in neighboring Serbia.

== Frequencies ==
- Višegrad 104.0 MHz

== See also ==
- List of radio stations in Bosnia and Herzegovina
- Radio Goražde
