= Radio Gračanica =

Bosnian radio station

Gračanica; Bosnia and Herzegovina
- Broadcast area: Tuzla Canton
- Frequencies: Gračanica 87.6 MHz; Gračanica 95.0 MHz
- Branding: Public

Programming
- Language: Bosnian language
- Format: Local news, talk and music

Ownership
- Owner: JU "Bosanski kulturni centar" Gračanica

History
- First air date: March 1, 1969
- Call sign meaning: RG 1

Technical information
- Transmitter coordinates: 44°41′21″N 18°18′08″E
- Repeaters: Gračanica/Grič; Gračanica/Hotilj

Links
- Webcast: On website
- Website: www.bkc-gracanica.ba

Radio Gračanica is a Bosnian local public radio station, broadcasting from Gračanica, Bosnia and Herzegovina.

It was launched on 1 March 1969 by the municipal council of Gračanica. In Yugoslavia and in SR Bosnia and Herzegovina, it was part of local/municipal Radio Sarajevo network affiliate.

This radio station broadcasts a variety of programs such as music, sport, local news and talk shows. Programs are mainly produced in Bosnian language.

Estimated number of potential listeners of Radio Gračanica is around 216,054. The radio station is also available in municipalities of Zenica-Doboj Canton and in Bosanska Posavina area.

Radio Gračanica is also available via IPTV platform Moja TV on channel 177.

== Frequencies ==
- Gračanica 87.6 MHz
- Gračanica 95.0 MHz

== See also ==
- List of radio stations in Bosnia and Herzegovina
