= Radio Bosanski Petrovac =

Bosnian radio station

- Bosanski Petrovac; Bosnia and Herzegovina
- Broadcast area: Una-Sana Canton
- Frequency: Bosanski Petrovac 90.9 MHz
- Branding: Public

Programming
- Language: Bosnian language
- Format: Local news, talk and music

Ownership
- Owner: JU "CENTAR ZA KULTURU I OBRAZOVANJE" Bosanski Petrovac

History
- First air date: 2007

Technical information
- Transmitter coordinates: 44°33′N 16°22′E
- Repeater: Osječenica/Oštrelj

Links
- Webcast: On website
- Website: www.bosanskipetrovac.gov.ba

Radio Bosanski Petrovac is a Bosnian local public radio station, broadcasting from Bosanski Petrovac, Bosnia and Herzegovina. As a municipal radio, this station broadcasts a variety of programs such as local news, talk shows and music (from 15:00 - 17:00 hours). Program is mainly produced in Bosnian language at one FM frequency (Bosanski Petrovac 90.9 MHz).

== History ==
During the competition process for issuing long-term broadcasting licenses in BiH, Radio Bosanski Petrovac was not qualified by the Communications Regulatory Agency of Bosnia and Herzegovina, and in 2002 the radio broadcaster lost the right to broadcast the FM radio program.

Radio Broadcasting License (for AM broadcasting) Radio Bosanski Petrovac used from 2007 to 2018, with a low reception available only within 200 meters of the headquarters. After BHRT abandoned the launch of the BH Radio 2 program, reserved frequencies were allocated to other interested stations across Bosnia and Herzegovina through the competition.

The municipality of Bosanski Petrovac as the owner of the radio has acquired new equipment and the signal is emitted via the radio transmitter on Mount Osječenica.

Estimated number of potential listeners of Radio Bosanski Petrovac is around 7,666.

Due to the geographical position in Bosanska Krajina area, this radiostation is also available in municipalities: Ključ, Bosanska Krupa, Bosansko Grahovo and in a part of the Lika-Senj County in neighboring Croatia.

== Frequencies ==
- Bosanski Petrovac 90.9 MHz

== See also ==
- List of radio stations in Bosnia and Herzegovina
