= Radio Busovača =

Bosnian radio station

Busovača; Bosnia and Herzegovina
- Broadcast area: Central Bosnia Canton
- Frequency: Busovača 101.9 MHz
- Branding: Public

Programming
- Languages: Croatian; Bosnian
- Format: Local news, talk and music

Ownership
- Owner: JP Radio Busovača d.o.o.

History
- First air date: 1993
- Former call signs: Radiopostaja Busovača
- Call sign meaning: -

Technical information
- Transmitter coordinates: 44°06′N 17°53′E
- Repeater: Busovača/Kula

Links
- Webcast: On website
- Website: www.radio-busovaca.com

Radio Busovača or Radio postaja Busovača is a Bosnian local public radio station, broadcasting from Busovača, Bosnia and Herzegovina. Estimated number of potential listeners is around 51,507.

Radio Busovača was launched in 1993. Program is mainly produced in Croatian and Bosnian. This radio station broadcasts a variety of programs such as music, local news, and talk shows.

== Frequencies ==
- Busovača 101.9 MHz

== See also ==
- List of radio stations in Bosnia and Herzegovina
