= Radio M =

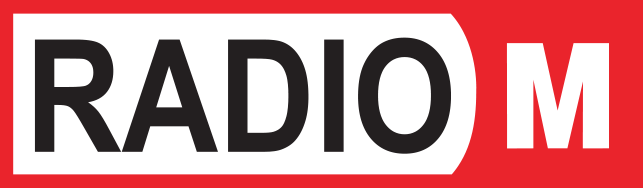
- Sarajevo; Bosnia and Herzegovina
- Broadcast area: Bosnia and Herzegovina
- Frequencies: Sarajevo 98.7 MHz; Banja Luka 104.2 MHz; Tuzla 106.3 MHz; Zenica 89.8 MHz

Programming
- Language: Bosnian language
- Format: Contemporary hit radio

Ownership
- Owner: 3 M Music Company d.o.o. Sarajevo

History
- First air date: 18 September 1990
- Call sign meaning: RADIO M

Technical information
- Transmitter coordinates: 43°52′N 18°25′E

Links
- Website: www.radiom.ba

Radio M is a Bosnian commercial radio station, broadcasting from Sarajevo.

== History and programming ==
As the first independent radio station in ex-Yugoslavia and the wider Balkan region, Radio M is entered in the Register of Public Media in 1990. Radio began broadcasting on 18 September 1990 and it was formatted as a city music radio station that broadcasts only the greatest music hits.

The station focuses on contemporary pop music, Bosnian music and national news.

== Frequencies ==
The program is currently broadcast on 5 frequencies:

- Sarajevo 98.7 MHz
- Banja Luka 104.2 MHz
- Tuzla 106.3 MHz
- Zenica 89.8 MHz
- Bihać 103.3 MHz

== See also ==
- List of radio stations in Bosnia and Herzegovina
