= Radio Olovo =

Bosnian radio station

Olovo; Bosnia and Herzegovina
- Broadcast area: Olovo
- Frequency: Olovo 95.1 MHz
- Branding: Public

Programming
- Language: Bosnian language
- Format: Local news, talk and music

Ownership
- Owner: Javna ustanova "Centar za kulturu i informisanje" p.o. Olovo

History
- First air date: February 13, 1998

Technical information
- Transmitter coordinates: 44°7′39″N 18°34′48″E
- Repeater: Olovo/Gaj

Links
- Webcast: On website
- Website: radio.olovo.ba

Radio Olovo is a Bosnian local public radio station, broadcasting from Olovo, Bosnia and Herzegovina.

Radio Olovo was launched on 13 February 1998 by the municipal council of Olovo. This radio station broadcasts a variety of programs such as music, local news, talk shows and sport. Program is mainly produced in Bosnian language.

Estimated number of potential listeners of Radio Olovo is around 8.277.

== See also ==
- List of radio stations in Bosnia and Herzegovina

== Frequencies ==
The program is currently broadcast at one frequency:

- Olovo 95.1 MHz
