= Radio gradska mreža - Mostarski radio =

Bosnian radio station

Coordinates: 43°20′N 17°48′E

Radio gradska mreža: Mostarski radio
Mostar; Bosnia and Herzegovina
- Broadcast area: Herzegovina-Neretva Canton
- Frequency: Mostar 88.6 MHz
- Branding: Public

Programming
- Language: Bosnian
- Format: Local news, talk and music

Ownership
- Owner: Javna ustanova Centar za kulturu Mostar

History
- First air date: December 1, 2016
- Former call signs: Omladinski Radio X (1996–2016)
- Call sign meaning: RGM MO

Technical information
- Repeater: Mostar/Fortica

Links
- Webcast: On website
- Website: www.mostarski.ba

Radio gradska mreža - Mostarski radio is a Bosnian local public radio station, broadcasting from Mostar, Bosnia and Herzegovina.

It was launched as RGM - Mostarski radio on 1 December 2016 by Javna ustanova Centar za kulturu Mostar. This radio station broadcasts a variety of programs such as local news from Mostar area, talk shows, music and sport. Until 2016, radiostation was called Omladinski Radio X.

Program is mainly produced in Bosnian language. Estimated number of potential listeners of Mostarski radio is around 84,511. The radio station is also available in municipalities of Herzegovina and in East Herzegovina.

== Frequencies ==
- Mostar 88.6 MHz

== See also ==
- List of radio stations in Bosnia and Herzegovina
