= Big Radio 2 =

Banja Luka; Bosnia and Herzegovina
- Broadcast area: Bosnia and Herzegovina

Ownership
- Owner: "BIG RADIO" proizvodno- uslužno i trgovačko društvo d.o.o. Banja Luka

History
- First air date: 1992

Technical information
- Transmitter coordinates: 44°46′N 17°11′E

Links
- Website: www.bigportal.ba

Big Radio 2 is a Bosnian commercial radio station, broadcasting from Banja Luka.

Big Radio 2 was launched in 1992.

== Frequencies ==
The program is currently broadcast on 26 frequencies:

- Gacko 88.3 MHz
- Višegrad 89.0 MHz
- Prijedor 89.6 MHz
- Sanski Most 90.1 MHz
- Glamoč 90.8 MHz
- Banja Luka 91.5 MHz
- Novi Grad, Republika Srpska 91.5 MHz
- Sarajevo 93.2 MHz
- Kalinovik 93.9 MHz
- Bugojno 95.6 MHz
- Tuzla 95.8 MHz
- Mostar 95.8 MHz
- Majevica 95.8 MHz
- Foča 96.4 MHz
- Modriča 96.6 MHz
- Doboj 97.5 MHz
- Derventa 97.5 MHz
- Prnjavor, Bosnia and Herzegovina 97.5 MHz
- Teslić 97.5 MHz
- Mrkonjić Grad 97.6 MHz
- Velika Kladuša 97.8 MHz
- Stolac 97.9 MHz
- Drvar 101.4 MHz
- Trebinje 103.5 MHz
- Zenica 103.6 MHz
- Travnik 103.6 MHz

== See also ==
- List of radio stations in Bosnia and Herzegovina
