= Radio Bosanska Krupa =

Bosnian radio station

Bosanska Krupa; Bosnia and Herzegovina
- Broadcast area: Una-Sana Canton
- Frequency: Bosanska Krupa 97.5 MHz
- Branding: Public

Programming
- Language: Bosnian language
- Format: Local news, talk and music

Ownership
- Owner: Javno preduzeće "RADIO BOSANSKA KRUPA" d.o.o.

History
- Call sign meaning: RADIO BK

Technical information
- Transmitter coordinates: 44°53′N 16°09′E
- Repeater: Kobiljnjak/Bosanska Krupa

Links
- Webcast: On website
- Website: www.radiobk.ba

Radio Bosanska Krupa is a Bosnian local public radio station, broadcasting from Bosanska Krupa, Bosnia and Herzegovina. As a municipal radio, this station broadcasts a variety of programs such as local news, talk shows and music. The program are mainly produced in Bosnian language and broadcast on one FM frequency (Bosanska Krupa 97.5 MHz).

Estimated number of potential listeners of Radio Bosanska Krupa is around 22,175.

Due to the geographical position in Bosanska Krajina area, this radio station is also available in municipalities: Bihać, Cazin, Sanski Most, Bužim, Bosanski Novi and in a part of the Karlovac and Sisak-Moslavina County in neighboring Croatia.

== Frequencies ==
- Bosanska Krupa 97.5 MHz

== See also ==
- List of radio stations in Bosnia and Herzegovina
