= Radio Gacko =

Bosnian radio station

Radio Gacko Радио Гацко
Gacko; Bosnia and Herzegovina
- Broadcast area: Gacko
- Frequency: Gacko 90.0 MHz
- Branding: Public

Programming
- Language: Serbian language
- Format: Local news, talk and music

Ownership
- Owner: Javna ustanova Informativno kulturni centar Gacko

History
- First air date: December 7, 1992

Technical information
- Transmitter coordinates: 43°10′N 18°32′E
- Repeater: Gacko/Jovanovo brdo

Links
- Webcast: On website
- Website: www.radiogacko.com

Radio Gacko (Радио Гацко in the Bosnian Cyrillic alphabet) is a Bosnian local public radio station, broadcasting from Gacko, Bosnia and Herzegovina.

It was launched on 7 December 1992 by the municipal council of Gacko. The station broadcasts a variety of programs such as music, sport, local news and talk shows.

Programs are mainly produced in Serbian from 08:00 to 15:00. The estimated number of potential listeners is around 8,061. The radio station is also available in municipalities in East Herzegovina and in neighboring Montenegro.

== Frequencies ==
- Gacko 90.0 MHz

== See also ==
- List of radio stations in Bosnia and Herzegovina
