= Bobar Radio =

- Bijeljina; Bosnia and Herzegovina
- Frequencies: Bijeljina 100.9 MHz; Zvornik 92.2 MHz; Doboj 100.9 MHz; Sarajevo 102.8 MHz; Banja Luka 95.3 MHz; Romanija 103.2 MHz; Mostar 105.9 MHz; Foča 88.9 MHz; Trebinje 105.5 MHz

Programming
- Language: Serbian language
- Format: Urban contemporary

Ownership
- Owner: S Media

History
- First air date: 26 November 1998
- Call sign meaning: BOBAR RADIO

Technical information
- Transmitter coordinates: 44°45′25″N 19°12′58″E

Links
- Website: www.radiobobar.com

Bobar Radio is a Bosnian commercial radio station, broadcasting from the city of Bijeljina. It is the most popular station in the country and can also be heard in parts of neighbouring Croatia, Montenegro and Serbia.

Bobar began broadcasting 26 November 1998 and it is formatted as an Urban contemporary radio station with music shows and news. It features both music from the former Yugoslavia area, and global hits.

On June 10, 2026, Bobar Radio was acquired by the Serbian media company S Media Radio S group

== Frequencies ==
The program is currently broadcast at 11 frequencies:

- Bijeljina 100.9 MHz
- Sarajevo 102.8 MHz
- Banja Luka 95.3 MHz
- Banja Luka 104.7 MHz
- Vlašić (Bosnian mountain) 104.7 MHz
- Doboj 100.9 MHz
- Zvornik 92.2 MHz
- Romanija 101.3 MHz
- Foča 88.9 MHz
- Mostar 105.9 MHz
- Trebinje 105.5 MHz
- Bihać 93.5 MHz

== See also ==
- List of radio stations in Bosnia and Herzegovina
