= Radio Goražde =

Bosnian radio station

Radio Goražde Radio BPK Goražde
Goražde; Bosnia and Herzegovina
- Broadcast area: Bosnian Podrinje Canton Goražde
- Frequencies: Goražde 101.5 MHz; Goražde 91.1 MHz
- Branding: Public

Programming
- Language: Bosnian language
- Format: Local news, talk and music

Ownership
- Owner: J.P. "Radio i televizija Bosansko-podrinskog kantona Goražde" Goražde
- Sister stations: RTV BPK Goražde

History
- First air date: July 27, 1970
- Call sign meaning: GORAZDE

Technical information
- Transmitter coordinates: 43°40′N 18°59′E
- Repeaters: Goražde/Crijetež; Goražde/Biserna

Links
- Webcast: On website
- Website: www.rtvbpk.ba

Radio Goražde is a Bosnian regional public radio station, broadcasting from Goražde, Bosnia and Herzegovina.

Radio Goražde was launched on 27 July 1970 by the municipal council of Goražde. In Yugoslavia and in SR Bosnia and Herzegovina, it was part of local/municipal Radio Sarajevo network affiliate.

This radio station broadcasts a variety of programs such as music, sport, local news and talk shows. Program is mainly produced in Bosnian language and it is available in municipalities of Bosnian Podrinje area. RTV BPK is also part of municipal services.

For the oldest radio station in Bosnian Podrinje Canton, estimated number of potential listeners of Radio Goražde is around 25,761.

Radio Goražde is also available via IPTV platform Moja TV on channel 196.

== Frequencies ==
The program is currently broadcast on 2 frequencies:

- Goražde 101.5 MHz
- Goražde 91.1 MHz

== See also ==
- List of radio stations in Bosnia and Herzegovina
