= Radio Glas Drine =

Bosnian radio station

Radio Glas Drine RGD
Sapna; Bosnia and Herzegovina
- Broadcast area: Bosansko Podrinje; Semberija; Bosanska Posavina; Tuzla Canton; Bosnian-Podrinje Canton
- Frequencies: Sapna 88.8 MHz; Kalesija 99.6 MHz; Zvornik 104.2 MHz; Tuzla 105.2 MHz; Teočak 106.4 MHz; Janja; 104.2 MHz; Čelić 103.8 MHz; Srebrenica 105.2 MHz

Programming
- Language: Bosnian language
- Format: Local news, talk and music

Ownership
- Owner: GLAS DRINE d.o.o. za informisanje Sapna
- Sister stations: TV Glas Drine

History
- First air date: September 3, 1992
- Former call signs: GL.DRINE

Technical information
- Transmitter coordinates: 44°30′55″N 18°0′40″E
- Repeaters: Sapna/Goduški vis Kalesija/Memići; Janja/Semberka; Zvornik/Mlađevac Tuzla/Ilinčica; Teočak/Stari Teočak; Čelić/Oglavak; Srebrenica/Bojna

Links
- Webcast: On website
- Website: rtvglasdrine.com www.studioonyx.com

Radio Glas Drine or RGD is a Bosnian group of commercial radio stations, broadcasting from Sapna, Bosnia and Herzegovina. It broadcasts a variety of programs such as news, music, morning and talk shows. A network of Radio Glas Drine radio stations is available in the Bosansko Podrinje and Bosnian-Podrinje Canton area, Semberija, Bosanska Posavina and Tuzla Canton area.

Program is mainly produced in Bosnian language and it is also available via internet, satellite (Eutelsat 16A) or via cable and IPTV platforms in BiH (Moja TV - Channel 183). According to media reports, Radio and TV Glas Drine have a great relationship with people who live outside of Bosnia and Herzegovina (Bosnian diaspora).

In addition to its own program, which is presented in the program schedule, Radio Glas Drine is one of the first members of "Radio 27" of the project of Radio Free Europe/Radio Slobodna Evropa and Radio Deutsche Welle/Radio DW Bosnian Service.

== History ==
When war in Bosnia and Herzegovina started, in 1992, public local/municipal network affiliate Radio BiH, studio Zvornik was founded after the establishment of the new national public service broadcaster RTVBiH - Radio BiH (now BHRT - BH Radio 1).

Radio BiH, studio Zvornik was launched on 3 September 1992 as public radio station intended for listeners in then free parts of Bosnia and Herzegovina. Since August 15, 1995, the radio station has been using its current name Radio Glas Drine.

From 1992 until 1999, Radio Glas Drine was the municipal media (local public radio stations under the jurisdiction of local authorities in Sapna), and in November 1999, the station was privatized to company "GLAS DRINE" d.o.o. za informisanje Sapna.

== Radio stations ==
=== Radio Glas Drine - Studio Sapna ===
Estimated number of potential listeners of Radio Glas Drine - Studio Sapna is around 222.524.

- Sapna 88.8 MHz
- Kalesija 99.6 MHz
- Zvornik 104.2 MHz
- Tuzla 105.2 MHz
- Teočak 106.4 MHz

Radio Glas Drine - Studio Janja or Radio Janja has been operating since August 2009, and is broadcast on the frequency 104.2 MHz.

- Janja 104.2 MHz as local output.

=== Radio Glas Drine - Studio Čelić ===
Radio Glas Drine - Studio Čelić or RGD Studio Onyx Čelić is local output of Radio Glas Drine.

The radio started operating in May 2005 and it is located in Čelić. The program is available via one FM frequency and online.

Estimated number of potential listeners of Radio Glas Drine - Studio Čelić is around 73.493.

- Čelić 103.8 MHz

=== Radio Glas Drine - Studio Srebrenica ===
Radio Glas Drine - Studio Srebrenica is local output of Radio Glas Drine.

The radio started operating from Srebrenica in August 2010 and it is located in Srebrenica. The program is available via one FM frequency and online.

Estimated number of potential listeners of Radio Glas Drine - Studio Srebrenica is around 40.065.

- Srebrenica 105.2 MHz

== See also ==
- List of radio stations in Bosnia and Herzegovina
- Radio TK - Studio Srebrenica
