= Big Radio 1 =

Bosnian radio station

- Banja Luka; Bosnia and Herzegovina
- Broadcast area: Banja Luka
- Frequency: Banja Luka 93.6 MHz
- RDS: BIG 1

Programming
- Language: Serbian
- Format: Local news, talk and music
- Network: Big Radio

Ownership
- Owner: BIG RADIO d.o.o. Banja Luka
- Sister stations: Big Radio 2 Big Radio 3 Big Radio 4

History
- Founded: March 21, 1992

Technical information
- Licensing authority: CRA BiH
- Transmitter coordinates: 44°46′N 17°11′E
- Repeater: Banja Luka/Krčmarice

Links
- Webcast: Listen Live
- Website: www.bigradiobl.com

Big Radio 1 is a Bosnian local commercial radio station, broadcasting from Banja Luka, Bosnia and Herzegovina. This radio station broadcasts a variety of programs such as rock, pop and evergreen music and local news. The owner of the radio station is the company BIG RADIO d.o.o. Banja Luka.

Program is mainly produced in Serbian at one FM frequency (Banja Luka 93.6 MHz) and it is available in the city of Banja Luka as well as in nearby cities and municipalities, including Laktaši, Čelinac, Prijedor, Gradiška and Kotor Varoš.

Under this name, Big Radio 1 was launched on 21 March 1992 as one of the first private local radio stations in Bosnia and Herzegovina.

Estimated number of listeners of Big Radio 1 is around 290,524.

== Big Radio ==
Big Radio operates three local FM radio stations (Big Radio 1, Big Radio 3, Big Radio 4), one near-national FM radio station in Bosnia and Herzegovina (Big Radio 2), three online internet radio services (Big Folk Radio, Big Balade Radio, Big Rock Radio) as well as two web portals www.bigportal.ba and www.bigradiobl.com.

== Frequencies ==
- Banja Luka 93.6 MHz

== See also ==
- List of radio stations in Bosnia and Herzegovina
- Big Radio
- Radio A
- Nes Radio
- RSG Radio
