= Radio Zenica =

Bosnian radio station

- Zenica; Bosnia and Herzegovina
- Broadcast area: Zenica-Doboj Canton; Central Bosnia area
- Frequencies: Maglaj 103.0 MHz; Zenica 106.6 MHz
- Branding: Public

Programming
- Language: Bosnian language
- Format: Local news, talk and music

Ownership
- Owner: JP "RTV Zenica" d.o.o Zenica
- Sister stations: RTV Zenica

History
- First air date: June 20, 1969
- Former call signs: R ZENICA

Technical information
- Transmitter coordinates: 44°12′14″N 17°54′28″E
- Repeaters: Maglaj/Borik; Zenica/Lisac

Links
- Webcast: On website
- Website: www.rtvze.ba

Radio Zenica is a Bosnian local public radio station, broadcasting from Zenica, Bosnia and Herzegovina and it broadcasts a variety of programs such as news, music, morning and talk shows. Program is operated by RTV Zenica and it is mainly produced in Bosnian language.

Radio Zenica was launched on 20 June 1969 as local/municipal Radio Sarajevo network affiliate from 1969 until 1992 when war in Bosnia and Herzegovina started.

During the war, with the establishment of the new national public service broadcaster RTVBiH - Radio BiH (now BHRT - BH Radio 1) radio stations from the former Radio Sarajevo 2 local network generally continued to operate as local public radio stations under the jurisdiction of local authorities in Bosnia and Herzegovina (municipalities, cantons).

In Zenica-Doboj Canton, on May 23, 1995 Radio Zenica was re-registered as a regional (cantonal) public company within RTV Zenica.

Estimated number of potential listeners of Radio Zenica in Zenica-Doboj Canton and Central Bosnia area is around 726.412.

This radiostation is also available via internet and via IPTV platforms in BiH (Moja TV - Channel 250).

== Frequencies ==
The program of Radio Zenica is currently broadcast at 2 frequencies:

- Maglaj 103.0 MHz
- Zenica 106.6 MHz

== See also ==
- List of radio stations in Bosnia and Herzegovina
- Radio Doboj
- Radio Maglaj
