= Radio A (Banja Luka) =

Bosnian radio station

A Radio
Banja Luka; Bosnia and Herzegovina
- Broadcast area: Banja Luka
- Frequency: Banja Luka 94.4 MHz

Programming
- Language: Serbian
- Format: Local news, talk and music

Ownership
- Owner: A RADIO d.o.o. Banja Luka
- Sister stations: ATV

History
- First air date: September 3, 2019
- Former call signs: Radio Agape
- Call sign meaning: A RADIO

Technical information
- Transmitter coordinates: 44°46′N 17°11′E
- Repeater: Banja Luka/Šibovi

Links
- Webcast: On website
- Website: www.atvbl.com

Radio A is a Bosnian local commercial radio station, broadcasting from Banja Luka, Bosnia and Herzegovina.

This radio station broadcasts a variety of programs such as music, talk show and local news. The owner of the radio station is ATV.

Alternativna TV bought Radio Igokea, which was owned by Gorica Dodik, the daughter of Milorad Dodik, and the Igokea Basketball Club. This radio, which was previously renamed "Agape", will operate as "A radio" in the future.

Radio A was founded on 3 September 2019 when local radio station Radio Agape was rebranded. "A radio" from Laktaši moved to Banja Luka and is located in the ATV building. According to media reports, Drahmi Miskin took over the position of director from Ivana Dodik, the wife of Dodik's son Igor.

Estimated number of listeners of A Radio is around 218.355.

The program is mainly produced in Serbian, 24 hours a day, and it is available in the territory of Banja Luka and Lijevče polje area.

== Frequencies ==
- Banja Luka 94.4 MHz

== See also ==
- List of radio stations in Bosnia and Herzegovina
- Nes Radio
- Pop FM
- Big Radio 1
