= Radio Gradiška =

Local radio station

Gradiška; Bosnia and Herzegovina
- Broadcast area: Gradiška
- Frequency: Gradiška 98.8 MHz
- Branding: Public

Programming
- Language: Serbian
- Format: Local news, talk and music

Ownership
- Owner: Javno preduzeće "Radio Gradiška" Gradiška

History
- First air date: September 29, 1979

Technical information
- Transmitter coordinates: 45°08′45″N 17°15′14″E
- Repeater: Vidovdanska ulica

Links
- Webcast: On website
- Website: www.radiogradiska.com

Radio Gradiška is a Bosnian local public radio station, broadcasting from Gradiška, Republika Srpska, Bosnia and Herzegovina.

It was launched on 29 September 1979 by the municipal council of Bosanska Gradiška. In Yugoslavia and in SR Bosnia and Herzegovina, it was part of local/municipal Radio Sarajevo network affiliate.

This radio station broadcasts a variety of programs such as local news, music, sport and talk shows. Program is mainly produced in Serbian.

Estimated number of listeners of Radio Gradiška is around 100,000. The radio station is also available in neighboring Croatia.

== Frequencies ==
- Gradiška 98.8 MHz

== History ==
Radio Gradiška officially started operating on September 29, 1979. The first editorial board of Radio Gradiška consisted of: Gojko Šerbula, director, journalists: Božo Šćepanović, Nenad Trifunović, Vlado Slijepčević and Jovan-Joco Dakić, music editor Milutin Stajčić, speakers Alma Hadžijusufović and Dubravka Lovrenović. The technical implementers were Nazif Čatak and Ivanka Kolundžić. The head of accounting is Dragica Marjanović, and the secretary of the editorial board is Enisa Zahirović. Within the Information Center, in addition to Radio Gradiška, the main activities were the correspondence offices for radio and television stations in the former Yugoslavia, and for the "Tanjug" Agency, newspapers: "Glas", "Oslobođenje", "Večernje novosti", "Politika" and "Vijesnik". For years, Radio Gradiška was a meeting place for well-known journalists from the major newsrooms of the former Yugoslavia.

== See also ==
- List of radio stations in Bosnia and Herzegovina
