= Radio Nevesinje =

Serbian radio station

Radio Nevesinje Радио Невесиње
Nevesinje; Bosnia and Herzegovina
- Broadcast area: Nevesinje
- Frequency: Nevesinje 96.3 MHz
- Branding: Public

Programming
- Language: Serbian
- Format: Local news, talk and music

Ownership
- Owner: Javna ustanova "Centar za informisanje i kulturu" sa p.o. Nevesinje

History
- First air date: May 13, 1992

Technical information
- Transmitter coordinates: 43°15′30″N 18°6′48″E
- Repeater: Nevesinje/Crgovo

Links
- Webcast: On website
- Website: www.radionevesinje.com

Radio Nevesinje or Радио Невесиње is a Bosnian local public radio station, broadcasting from Nevesinje, Bosnia and Herzegovina. It was launched on 13 May 1992.

This radio station broadcasts a variety of programs such as local news and talk shows. The program is mainly produced in Serbian. Estimated number of potential listeners of Radio Nevesinje is around 17,888. Radiostation is also available in municipalities of East Herzegovina and in neighboring Montenegro.

== Frequencies ==
- Nevesinje 96.3 MHz

== See also ==
- List of radio stations in Bosnia and Herzegovina
