= Radio Bileća =

Herzegovi nian radio station

Radio Bileća Радио Билећа
Bileća; Bosnia and Herzegovina
- Broadcast area: Bileća
- Frequency: Bileća 92.2 MHz
- Branding: Public

Programming
- Language: Serbian
- Format: Local news, talk and music

Ownership
- Owner: JU Centar za informisanje - Radio Bileća

History
- First air date: 1992

Technical information
- Transmitter coordinates: 42°52′N 18°26′E
- Repeater: Bileća/Bodarnik

Links
- Webcast: On website
- Website: www.radio.bilecainfo.com

Radio Bileća or Радио Билећа is a Bosnian local public radio station, broadcasting from Bileća, Bosnia and Herzegovina. It was launched in 1992 by JU Centar za informisanje Bileća. This radio station broadcasts a variety of programs such as music, sport, local news and talk shows.

Program is mainly produced in Serbian from 7 am to 6 pm. The estimated number of potential listeners of Radio Bileća is around 10,361. Radiostation is also available in municipalities of East Herzegovina and in neighboring Montenegro.

== Frequencies ==
- Bileća 92.2 MHz

== See also ==
- List of radio stations in Bosnia and Herzegovina
