= Radio Doboj =

Bosnian radio station

Radio Doboj Радио Добој
- Doboj; Bosnia and Herzegovina
- Broadcast area: Doboj
- Frequency: Doboj 96.3 MHz
- Branding: Public

Programming
- Language: Serbian
- Format: Local news, talk and music

Ownership
- Owner: Javno preduzeće Radio Televizija Doboj d.o.o.

History
- First air date: April 17, 1967
- Call sign meaning: RTVDOBOJ

Technical information
- Transmitter coordinates: 44°43′53″N 18°05′04″E
- Repeater: Doboj/Ciganište

Links
- Webcast: On website
- Website: www.rtvdoboj.org

Radio Doboj or Радио Добој is a Bosnian local public radio station, broadcasting from Doboj, Bosnia and Herzegovina.

It was launched on 17 April 1967 by the municipal council of Doboj. In Yugoslavia and in SR Bosnia and Herzegovina, it was part of local/municipal Radio Sarajevo network affiliate. This radio station broadcasts a variety of programs such as music, sport, local news and talk shows. The programs are mainly produced in Serbian.

The estimated number of potential listeners of Radio Doboj is around 166,261. The radio station is also available in municipalities of Zenica-Doboj Canton and in Bosanska Posavina area.

RTV Doboj, a cable television channel, is also part of the public municipality services.

== Frequencies ==
- Doboj 96.3 MHz

== See also ==
- List of radio stations in Bosnia and Herzegovina
