= Pop FM =

Bosnian radio station

- Banja Luka; Bosnia and Herzegovina
- Broadcast area: Banja Luka
- Frequency: Banja Luka 97.6 MHz

Programming
- Language: Serbian
- Format: Local news, talk and music

Ownership
- Owner: NIGD Dnevne nezavisne novine d.o.o. Nezavisne novine
- Sister stations: Nes radio

History
- First air date: July 23, 2018
- Former call signs: Nes Castra (2007–2018)
- Call sign meaning: POP FM

Technical information
- Transmitter coordinates: 44°46′N 17°11′E
- Repeater: Banja Luka/Željeznička Kolonija-Nes studio

Links
- Webcast: On website
- Website: www.popfm.ba

Pop FM is a Bosnian local commercial radio station, broadcasting from Banja Luka, Bosnia and Herzegovina. This radio station broadcasts a variety of programs such as music and local news. The owner of the radio station is the company Nezavisne novine.

Under this name, Pop FM was launched on 23 July 2018 when local radio station Nes Castra (2007–2018) was rebranded. Sister radio station is near-national radio in Bosnia and Herzegovina, Nes Radio.

Estimated number of listeners of Pop FM is around 159.666.

The program is mainly produced in Serbian, 24 hours a day, and it is available in the territory of the City of Banja Luka, and parts of the municipality of Čelinac, Kotor Varoš in stereo with RDS.

== Frequencies ==
- Banja Luka 97.6 MHz

== See also ==
- List of radio stations in Bosnia and Herzegovina
- Nes Radio
