= RSG Radio =

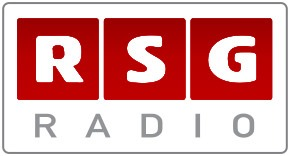

Sarajevo; Bosnia and Herzegovina
- Broadcast area: Bosnia and Herzegovina
- Frequencies: Sarajevo 97.5 MHz; Sarajevo 104.3 MHz; Zenica 97.5 MHz; Tuzla 104.3 MHz; Mostar 104.3 MHz; Doboj 104.3 MHz; Bihać 104.3 MHz; Brčko 104.3 MHz; Travnik 104.3 MHz; Goražde 104.3 MHz; Trebinje 87.7 MHz; Čapljina 104.3 MHz; Neum 92.6 MHz

Programming
- Language: Bosnian language
- Format: Contemporary hit radio, entertainment, talk, news
- Affiliations: RSG Group

Ownership
- Owner: "RSG" d.o.o. Sarajevo
- Sister stations: Radio Mix; Antena Sarajevo

History
- First air date: 25 January 1993 (as Radio Stari Grad)
- Former call signs: RADIO STARI GRAD
- Call sign meaning: RSG RADIO

Technical information
- Transmitter coordinates: 43°52′N 18°25′E

Links
- Website: www.rsg.ba

RSG Radio is a Bosnian commercial radio station, broadcasting from Sarajevo.

== History and programming ==
Radio Stari Grad was founded on 23 January 1993 and it was conceived as a radio service for Old Town area of Sarajevo (During the Siege of Sarajevo).

Responsible way of doing business and fair relationship with listeners, have greatly contributed to the extremely positive image, which RSG enjoyed in professional media circles, and the general public. Motivated and creative employees, loyal audience, the wealth of programs, build infrastructure, strong marketing and exceptional social status, benefits are where RSG Radio bases its ambitious plans.

RSG Radio is part of the informal media group in the radio market of Bosnia and Herzegovina called RSG Group.

The station focuses on contemporary pop music, popular game shows and national news. RSG also has traffic service where listeners can find more information by calling the toll-free call center (0800 510 10). Latest national news broadcast on the full hour, while the Sarajevo city news are broadcast every half-hour. Media servis produces all the news for RSG and Antenna Sarajevo. The program is also broadcast via web and satellite (Eutelsat W2, 16 degrees E, frequency 11262, symbol rate 30000, FEC 2/3)

=== RSG Group ===
RSG Group consists of two radio programs RSG Radio and Antena Sarajevo (sister radio station founded as RSG1 Sarajevo in 2009), marketing agency and production – Netra, radio news production services – Media servis, and web portals www.rsg.ba and www.antena.ba..

== Frequencies ==
The program is currently broadcast at 4 frequencies in 11 Bosnian cities:

- Sarajevo 97.5 MHz
- Banja Luka 94.1 MHz
- Zenica 97.5 MHz
- Tuzla 104.3 MHz
- Mostar 104.3 MHz
- Doboj 104.3 MHz
- Bihać 88.4 MHz
- Brčko 104.3 MHz
- Travnik 104.3 MHz
- Goražde 104.3 MHz
- Trebinje 87.7 MHz
- Čapljina 104.3 MHz
- Neum 92.6 MHz
- Mostar 92.6 MHz
- Drežnica 93.6 MHz
- Višegrad 102.3 MHz
- Konjic 104.3 MHz
- Travnik 104.3 MHz
- Bugojno 104.3 MHz
- Fojnica 107.2 MHz

== See also ==
- List of radio stations in Bosnia and Herzegovina
