= Television in Bosnia and Herzegovina =

Television in Bosnia and Herzegovina was first introduced in 1961. Out of 94 TV stations, 71 are commercial, 20 are public (regional, local or municipal ownership), while 3 public services are funded through subscription.

TV stations by type of funding in Bosnia and Herzegovina
Data by CRA BiH (1 July 2019)	Sum
Television licence	3
Public broadcasting (Regional, local or municipal ownership)	20
Commercial broadcasting	71

== History ==
First broadcasting in Bosnia and Herzegovina started in 1961 when Radio-Televizija Sarajevo began its programme although without its own TV studio at that time (it used Radio Sarajevo's premises for this purpose).

Televizija Sarajevo (TVSA) started broadcasting its own TV program on 17 March 1969. with first live TV-news program called "Večernji ekran“ (Evening Screen). At the beginning of 1975., the first phase of the construction of RTV Dom – TV headquarters building in Sarajevo was completed. Two years later, in 1977, the second television program (TVSA 2) was launched.

With the help of other members of the Yugoslav Radio Television system, Radio-Television Sarajevo successfully implemented all special broadcasting programs dedicated to the 1984 Winter Olympics in Sarajevo. The third television channel (TVSA 3) has started with broadcasting in 1989 from headquarters also known as the RTV Dom (nickname "Sivi dom") located in Sarajevo.

During the breakup of Yugoslavia in the early 1990s, Yugoslav Radio Television system dissolved when most republics became independent countries. The once-recognizable joint program created by the exchange of TV content in JRT network soon was suspended and interrupted, and separate national TV stations began to use propaganda in tv news and other programs. As a result, the once subnational broadcasting centers became public broadcasters of the newly independent states. In such conditions, the first commercial television stations in the Balkans appear.

At the beginning of the War in Bosnia, in 1992, RTV Sarajevo changed its name to Radio and Television of Bosnia and Herzegovina (RTV BiH). Headquarters of the RTV BiH were often exposed to war damages. During the siege of Sarajevo, RTV BiH was forced to broadcast only one radio (Radio BiH) and one television program (tv bih) via damaged transmitters at Hum TV Tower, with minimal technical conditions.

On 2 May 1992, Hum Tower was partly destroyed by the JNA and VRS. Militants illegally took over all property (TV transmitters and releys) from the former TVSA. Seven out of ten TV repeaters from former TVSA in the territory of BiH were controlled by the JNA and VRS.

From stolen equipment, a parallel new TV channel (Kanal S – SRT; now: RTRS) was established in May 1992 to broadcast propaganda or news builtens from Serbian RTV Beograd via its seat in Pale, near Sarajevo. The second TV transmitter above the Sarajevo, Bosnian capital, (Trebević Television transmitter) was directly controlled by SRT (Srpska radio televizija). With the outbreak of the Conflict between Croatia and Bosnian and Herzegovina, TV transmitters under the control of HVO started to rebroadcast news programs of HRT via its Erotel affiliate based in Mostar.

During the war (1992–1995), many independent local or regional stations (public and commercial) were launched across the country. Former network affiliates of the second radio channel (Radio Sarajevo 2) often were used as facilities for these new TV stations.

On 1 January 1993, RTV BiH was admitted as an active member of the European Broadcasting Union.

In the Alipašino Polje neighborhood of Sarajevo, on 28 June 1995, a modified air-bomb was thrown by JNA/VRS into the building of RTV BiH. One person was killed, and at least 30 injured.

Hum Tower also suffered major damage, which is partially repaired after the war by technicians from national public broadcaster, BHRT.

After the war, many local media continued to work. With the help of various international donors, equipment has been renewed through media support projects.

On 2 March 2001, Communications Regulatory Agency of Bosnia and Herzegovina was founded with mission to regulate the electronic communications and audiovisual sector in BiH. An important task was the management and supervision of the frequency spectrum.

After 17 July 2002, in Bosnia and Herzegovina there was no radio and TV stations that broadcast without official broadcasting licence issued by the CRA.

All local media in BiH, which could not meet the official criteria of the competition for broadcasting licences were closed in the period between 2000 and 2002. According to the recommendations, CRA BiH has established a public register of permits issued for all broadcasters with relevant data about all media outlets (radio stations, TV channels...) who have received permission to work.

Broadcasters in Bosnia and Herzegovina
Year	Radio	Television
2008	126	39
2009	125	42
2010	123	40
2011	133	42
2012	134	45
2013	135	42
2014	131	48
2015	133	51
2016	130	51
2017	/	/
2018	149	93* (CRA)

== Analogue television ==
=== Free-to-air terrestrial broadcasters ===
==== National and near-national coverage ====
===== Television licence funding =====
Bosnia and Herzegovina has 3 public broadcasters financed from radio and television fees (RTV pretplata/pristojba). The amount of television fees in BiH is 7.5 BAM per month (collected along with Electric bill).

The national public broadcaster for Bosnia and Herzegovina is BHRT (Radio televizija Bosne i Hercegovine). With one television and one radio channel it covers more than 97% of the country. BHRT is the only Bosnian member of the European Broadcasting Union.

The entity broadcaster for Federation of Bosnia and Herzegovina is RTVFBiH (Radio televizija Federacije Bosne i Hercegovine). The program is broadcast on one radio and one television channel. The entity broadcaster for Republika Srpska is RTRS (Radio televizija Republike Srpske). The program is broadcast via one radio and two television channels (one channel is via cable systems).

There are plans to establish a public TV corporation that would operate, consolidate and improve quality of all Bosnian tax-funded public broadcasters.

List of television channels in Bosnia and Herzegovina funded by TV-tax ^{(7.50 BAM per month)}
TV channel	Type	Launched	Formerly called	Owned by	Language	HDTV
BHT1	General	1 June 1961; 65 years ago	RTV Sarajevo (1961–1992); RTV BiH (tvbih) (1991–1995); BHT (1995–1998); PBS BiH (BHTV 1) (1998–2004); BHT 1 (since 2004)	BHRT	Bosnian, Croatian and Serbian	✓
Federalna TV	General	27 October 2001; 24 years ago		RTVFBiH	Bosnian and Croatian	✓
RTRS.tv	General	19 April 1992; 34 years ago	Канал С ТВ РС	RTRS	Serbian	✗

===== Commercial funding =====
Near-national commercial broadcasters are primarily focused on the entitiy markets, but some of them also broadcast a joint program (Mreža TV). They provide a common advertising space (on country, entity, or regional level) that is more attractive to major advertisers.

List of Commercial television channels in BiH
TV channel	Type	Launched	Formerly called	Owned by	Language	HDTV
OBN	General	23 July 1996; 30 years ago	Open Broadcast Network	Ivan Ćaleta (100%)	Croatian, Bosnian and Serbian	✓
Nova BH	General	9 October 2018; 7 years ago	Pink BH (2003–2018)	United Group	Bosnian, Serbian and Croatian	✓
Hayat	General	24 February 1992; 34 years ago	Neovisna televizija Hayat; Hayat HD	Hayat TV	Bosnian	✓
BN Televizija	General	5 May 1998; 28 years ago		RTV BN	Serbian	✓
ATV	General	4 June 1997; 29 years ago		Alternativna TV	Serbian	✓
O Kanal	General	26 August 2010; 15 years ago	TV1-RTM	Oslobođenje	Bosnian	✓
Prva BH	General	29 December 2021; 4 years ago	NTV Jasmin (1998–2022)	Unipol Group	Bosnian	✓
Una TV	General	21 December 2021; 4 years ago		Una World Network	Bosnian, Serbian and Croatian	✓

==== Regional coverage ====
===== Public funding =====
Other public TV stations broadcast only locally at the municipal, local, and regional levels, such as 5 cantonal TV stations (e.g. TVSA, RTV TK, RTV USK, RTV ZE, and RTV BPK).

List of Public television channels in BiH funded by Cantons ^{(via Assembly or grants)}
TV channel	Type	Launched	Formerly called	Owned by	Language	HDTV
TVSA	Regional	29 June 1998; 28 years ago	Televizija Kantona Sarajevo	Sarajevo Canton	Bosnian	✓
RTV TK	Regional	20 February 1992; 34 years ago	Televizija Tuzlanskog kantona	Tuzla Canton	Bosnian	✓
RTV USK	Regional	22 December 1995; 30 years ago	Televizija Unsko-sanskog kantona	Una-Sana Canton	Bosnian	✓
RTV ZE	Regional	23 May 1995; 31 years ago	Televizija Zenica	Zenica-Doboj Canton	Bosnian	✓
RTV BPK	Regional	26 August 1996; 29 years ago	Televizija BPK Goražde	Bosnian-Podrinje Canton	Bosnian	✓
RTV HB	General	1 July 1993; 33 years ago	Radiotelevizija Herceg-Bosne	RTV HB	Croatian	✓

===== Commercial funding =====
Commercial terrestrial stations are mostly located in larger towns and settlements (Sarajevo, Banja Luka, Mostar, Bijeljina, Brčko, Bihać, Trebinje, Travnik, Zenica...).

List of regional commercial television channels in BiH
TV channel	Type	Launched	Formerly called	Owned by	Language	HDTV
Televizija K3	Regional	15 April 1995; 31 years ago	Televizija K3		Serbian	✓
Televizija Hit	Regional	1999; 27 years ago	RTV Hit Brčko		Serbian	✗
Herceg TV	Regional	2008; 18 years ago	RTV Herceg		Serbian	✗
TV Slon Extra	Regional	1 December 2005; 20 years ago			Bosnian	✓

==== Local, city or municipal coverage ====
Local TV networks share local news (e.g. BH Veza in FBiH entity or PRIMA Mreža in RS entity).

===== Public funding =====
List of Public television channels in BiH funded by local government unit ^{(via municipal assembly or grants)}
TV channel	Type	Launched	Formerly called	Owned by	Language	HDTV
TV Vogošća	Municipal	10 December 1997; 28 years ago	Televizija Vogošća	Vogošća	Bosnian	✓
TV Cazin	Municipal	1993; 33 years ago	Televizija Cazin	Cazin	Bosnian	✓
TV Visoko	Municipal	13 July 1992; 34 years ago	Televizija Visoko	Visoko	Bosnian	✓
TV Živinice	Municipal	5 May 1992; 34 years ago	Televizija Živinice	Živinice	Bosnian	✓
TV Bugojno	Municipal	1992; 34 years ago	Televizija Bugojno	Bugojno	Bosnian	✗
TV Prijedor	Municipal	2000; 26 years ago	Televizija Prijedor	Prijedor	Serbian	✓
TV Rudo	Municipal	28 June 1993; 33 years ago	Televizija Rudo	Rudo	Serbian	✗

===== Commercial funding =====
List of local commercial television channels in BiH
TV channel	Type	Launched	Formerly called	Owned by	Language	HDTV
TV Alfa	General	2007; 19 years ago	Televizija Alfa	Dnevni avaz	Bosnian	✗
MTV Igman	Religious	1993; 33 years ago			Bosnian	✓
TV Bel Kanal	General	2003; 23 years ago	ТВ Бел Канал		Serbian	✗
TV Simić	General	5 July 1997; 29 years ago	ТВ Симић		Serbian	✗
RTV Vikom	General	1997; 29 years ago			Serbian	✗
NTV 101	General	1998; 28 years ago	NTV 101 Sanski Most		Bosnian	✓
NTV Arena	General	18 August 1999; 26 years ago	Nezavisni TV – Studio "Arena"		Serbian	✗
RTV Slobomir	General	2005; 21 years ago	Televizija Slobomir		Serbian	✗
NTVIC Kakanj	General	11 April 1994; 32 years ago	Neovisna televizija IC		Bosnian	✓
NTV Amna	General	1997; 29 years ago	Neovisna televizija Amna		Bosnian	✗
RTV Maglaj	General	9 June 1992; 34 years ago			Bosnian	✗

== Cable and IPTV television ==
There are 36 licensed cable TV operators in Bosnia and Herzegovina.

Cable and IPTV television
Company name	Group	Headquarters	DVB-C Service	IPTV Service	DTH/Sat Service	Company website
BH Telecom	✗	Sarajevo	✗	✓ Moja TV; ✓ Moja Web TV	✗	www.bhtelecom.ba www.mojatv.ba
HT Eronet	✓ Hrvatski Telekom	Mostar	✗	✓ HOME.TV	✗	www.hteronet.ba
Telekom Srpske	✓ Telekom Srbija	Banja Luka	✗	✓ Open IPTV	✓ m:SAT TV	www.mtel.ba
Elta-Kabel	✓ Telekom Srbija	Doboj	✓ ELTA (CATV); ✓ ELTA (Digital TV)	✓ ELTA	✗	www.elta-kabel.com
LOGOSOFT	✓ Telekom Srbija	Sarajevo	✗	✓ Super TV	✗	www.logosoft.ba
Blic.Net	✓ Telekom Srbija	Banja Luka	✓ TViN (Cable); ✓ TViN (Digital/MMDS)	✓ TViN	✗	www.blic.net
Telrad Net d.o.o.	✓ Telekom Srbija	Bijeljina	✓ Telerad (CATV); ✓ Telerad (Digital/MMDS)	✗	✗	www.telrad.net
Elta-MT	✓ Telekom Srbija	Tuzla	✓ ELTA (CATV); ✓ ELTA (Digital TV)	✗	✗	www.elta-mt.ba
ELNET	✓ Telekom Srbija	Laktaši	✓ ELTA (CATV); ✓ ELTA (Digital TV)	✗	✗	www.elnetrs.ba
Telemach	✓ United Group	Sarajevo	✓ EON.TV	✓ EON.TV; ✓ NetTV Plus (OTT outside BiH)	✓ Total TV	www.telemach.ba www.eon.tv
M&H Company	✓ United Group	Sarajevo	✓ EON.TV	✓ EON.TV	✓ Total TV	www.hs-hkb.ba www.eon.tv
HKB Net d.o.o.	✓ United Group	Sarajevo	✓ EON.TV	✓ EON.TV	✓ Total TV	www.hs-hkb.ba www.eon.tv
HS Kablovska TV	✓ United Group	Sarajevo	✓ EON.TV	✓ EON.TV	✓ Total TV	www.hs-hkb.ba www.eon.tv
TRION TEL	✓ United Group	Banja Luka	✓ EON.TV	✓ EON.TV	✓ Total TV	www.triontel.net www.eon.tv
TX TV	✗	Tuzla	✓ TXTV (CATV); ✓ TXTV (Digital TV)	✗	✗	www.txtv.ba
NEON Solucije	✗	Tuzla	✓ Neon Solucije (CATV); ✓ Neon Solucije (Digital TV)	✗	✗	www.neon.ba
Miss.Net	✗	Bihać	✓ Miss.Net (CATV); ✓ ELTA (Digital TV)	✗	✗	www.missnet.ba
Telinea	✗	Bihać	✓ (Digital TV)	✗	✗	www.telinea.net
TELESKY	✗	Gradačac	✓ TELESKY (Digital TV)	✓ TELESKY (IPTV TV)	✓ Total TV	www.telesky.ba
Dasto-Semtel d.o.o.	✗	Bijeljina	✓ ZONA TV (Digital TV)	✓ ZONA TV	✗	www.zona.ba
ZipZap d.o.o.	✗	Zenica	✓ ZipZap TV (Digital TV)	ZipZap TV (IPTV); ZipZap TVtoGO	✗	www.zipzap.ba
Media Sky d.o.o.	✗	Živinice	✓ Media Sky (Cable TV); ✓ Media Sky (Digital TV)	✗	✗	www.mediasky.ba
WIRAC.NET	✗	Gračanica	✓ WIRAC.NET (Cable TV); ✓ WIRAC.NET (Digital TV)	✗	✗	www.wirac.net
Avax NET	✗	Lukavac	✓ Avax NET (Cable TV); ✓ Avax NET (Digital TV)	✓ Avax NET (IPTV)	✗	www.avax.ba
Maxtv d.o.o.	✗	Brčko	✗	✓ MAX.TV (IPTV)	✗	www.maxtv.ba
Tel-Net d.o.o.	✗	Ključ	TEL-NET (Cable TV)	✗	✗	—N/a
TEONET d.o.o.	✗	Tuzla	Teonet (Cable TV)	✗	✗	—N/a
Terc Trade Company d.o.o.	✗	Prnjavor	✓ TercTV (Cable TV); ✓ TercTV (Digital TV)	✗	✗	www.terctv.com
DSL ELEKTRONIKA d.o.o.	✗	Modriča	✗	✓ DSL TV	✗	www.dslon.ws
KT Sara d.o.o.	✗	Drvar	✓ KT Sara (Cable TV); ✓ KT Sara (Digital TV)	✗	✗	www.ktsara.net
KDS Ortak d.o.o.	✗	Šipovo	✓ Ortak CATV (Cable TV)	✗	✗	www.kdsortak.net
Stokić d.o.o.	✗	Doboj	✓ Stokić CATV (Cable TV)	✗	✗	www.medioq.com
KTV E-G-E d.o.o.	✗	Doboj Jug	✓ KTV E-G-E (Cable TV); ✓ KTV E-G-E (Digital TV)	✗	✗	www.ktv-ege.ba
KG-1 d.o.o.	✗	Goražde	✓ KG-1 TV (Cable TV); ✓ KG-1 TV (Digital TV)	✗	✗	www.kg1.ba
AMBnet d.o.o.	✗	Živinice	✓ AMBnet TV (Cable TV); ✓ AMBnet TV (Digital TV)	✗	✗	www.amb-net.ba
Detel d.o.o.	✗	Sarajevo	✓ Detel TV (Digital TV)	✗	✗	www.detel.ba

Depending on cable provider and subscription type, cable TV offer usually includes most of the local terrestrial channels. Offers are usually customized for specific city. Basic cable offer is limited to 40-65 TV channels in the starting packages. Digital and IPTV packages are limited to 100-350 channels (including the additional channel packages, HD packages, VOD etc.).

Cable television companies in Bosnia and Herzegovina
Media database by CRA BiH ^{(November 2018)}	Sum
Registered companies with licences (Operators)	36
Registered on-demand audiovisual media service providers	13

Registered on-demand audiovisual media service providers by CRA BiH:

- Videoteka by Super TV
- MojaTV Videoteka & MojaTV Flix by BH Telecom
- HOME.TV Videoteka by HT Eronet
- DEPO TV / ZONA by www.depo.ba/depo-tv
- BUKA TV by www.6yka.com
- PRVI.TV by www.prvi.tv
- video klub by Telemach
- video klub HKB-net by HKB-net
- video klub HS by HS kablovska
- RTV BIR by www.bir.ba
- Hayat PLAY by Hayat TV
- RTV BN d.o.o. Bijeljina by RTV BN
- JP RTRS Banja Luka by RTRS

=== Domestic pay-tv channels ===
There are over 66 licensed TV stations (both private and publicly owned) which broadcast their programmes exclusively via cable, satellite or IPTV. Cable and IPTV operators also manage their own TV channels that are part of their multimedia services (digital or IPTV info channels).

==== Public funding (Cable only) ====
Many local and regional public TV stations funded by local government unit are available through cable television only.

List of Public cable only television channels in BiH funded by local government unit ^{(via municipal assembly or grants)}
TV channel	Type	Launched	Formerly called	Owned by	Language	HDTV
Televizija Jablanica	Municipal	1999; 27 years ago	RTV Jablanica	Jablanica	Bosnian	✓
RTV 7	Municipal	29 July 2012; 14 years ago	Televizija 7 Tuzla	Tuzla	Bosnian	✓
RTV Kozarska Dubica	Municipal		РТВ Козарска Дубица	Kozarska Dubica	Serbian	✗
RTV Doboj	Municipal		РТВ Добој	Doboj	Serbian	✓
TV Lukavac	Municipal	2011; 15 years ago	TV Lukavac	Lukavac	Bosnian	✗
RTV Sana	Municipal	21 June 2016; 10 years ago	Radio televizija Sana	Sanski Most	Bosnian	✓

==== Commercial funding broadcasters (Cable only) ====
Foreign channels neighboring countries are available in BiH. For this reason, all TV advertisements from common ex-Yugoslav area are freely broadcast on a daily basis in Bosnian cable systems. That is a major problem for domestic commercial media market, cable and satellite TV stations that aim to capture wider audiences.

- BN TV HD - Bijeljina (RTV BN)
- BN Music HD - Bijeljina (RTV BN)
- Hayat Plus - Vogošća (Hayat)
- Hayat Folk - Vogošća (Hayat)
- Hayat Music - Vogošća (Hayat)
- Hayatovci - Vogošća (Hayat)
- Face TV - Sarajevo
- Cinema TV - Sarajevo
- Vikom Music - Gradiška
- Hema HD - Sarajevo
- BMC Music TV - Vogošća
- BMC Etno TV - Vogošća
- NEON TV - Kalesija
- Kontakt - Banja Luka
- Izvorna TV - Živinice
- City TV - Mostar
- Kanal 6 - Travnik (TNT Group)
- TNT KIDS TV - Travnik (TNT Group)
- Sevdah TV - Travnik (TNT Group)
- DREAMPORN HD - Travnik (TNT Group)
- Televizija 5 HD - Sarajevo
- ELTA TELEVIZIJA - Banja Luka (Elta Media Group)
- ELTA 2 - Tuzla (Elta Media Group)
- OTV Valentino - Brčko (DENI-COMPANI)
- VALENTINO ETNO - Brčko (DENI-COMPANI)
- Valentino Music HD - Brčko (DENI-COMPANI)
- PRVA HERCEGOVAČKA - Brčko (DENI-COMPANI)
- TV Slon Info - Tuzla
- NTV Patria - Doboj
- NTV Jata - Srebrenik
- Smart televizija - Tešanj
- IN televizija - Bijeljina
- KTV Zavidovići - Zavidovići
- Kablovska televizija KG-1 - Goražde
- BDC Televizija - Brčko
- RA-TV - Jelah
- TV GLAS DRINE - Sapna
- tb1 - Trebinje
- Posavina TV - Seonjaci, Brčko
- Inicijativa TV - Tuzla
- Info Plus - Gradiška
- WTV Gračanica - Gračanica
- TATABRADA - Srebrenik
- TV ONE HD - Kozarac, Prijedor
- B1 TELEVIZIJA - Gradačac
- TROPIK TV - Zenica

=== Foreign pay-tv channels ===
Depending on cable provider and subscription type, cable TV offer usually includes channels such as FOX, FOX Movies, FOX Life, FOX Crime, AXN, MGM, Sci Fi Channel, Eurosport, MTV, Comedy Central Extra, National Geographic Channel (with subtitles in official Bosnian, Croatian or Serbian). Bosnian cable operators offer a large number of regional national (e.g., HRT, RTS, B92) and international TV channels (e.g., CNN, DW, RTL, Euronews, Russia Today).

Premium sports offer is mostly limited to Arena Sport or Sport Klub TV packages. Premium movies channels are mostly limited to the HBO and Cinemax TV packages.

There are seven licensed providers of on-demand services (VOD) in Bosnia and Herzegovina.

==== United Group / United Media ====
- N1 HD BiH Luxembourg (newscast in Bosnia and Herzegovina)
- N1 HD Serbia Luxembourg, Serbia
- N1 HD Croatia Luxembourg, Croatia
- SK HD (audio in Serbia/Croatia)
- SK 1 HD (audio in Serbia/Croatia)
- SK 2 HD (audio in Serbia/Croatia)
- SK 3 HD (audio in Serbia/Croatia)
- SK 4 (audio in Serbia/Croatia)
- SK 5 (audio in Serbia/Croatia)
- SK 6 (audio in Serbia/Croatia)
- SK 7 (audio in Serbia/Croatia)
- SK 8 (audio in Serbia/Croatia)
- SK 9 (audio in Serbia/Croatia)
- SK 10 (audio in Serbia/Croatia)
- SK Golf HD (audio in Serbia/Croatia)
- Nova TV Croatia
- Nova M Montenegro
- Nova S Serbia
- Grand TV Serbia
- Grand TV 2 Serbia
- Lov i Ribolov Serbia
- IDJ TV HD Serbia
- Pikaboo HD Serbia
- Vavom HD Serbia

==== Croatia Records / Jugoton ====
- CMC TV

==== Kopernikus Cable Network ====
- KC::N 1 Kopernikus
- KC::N 2 Music
- KC::N 3 Svet +* Prva TV (audio in Serbia)
- Prva Plus (audio in Serbia)
- Prva World (audio in Serbia)
- Prva Kick (audio in Serbia)
- B92 (audio in Serbia)

==== DM SAT ====
- DM SAT
- DM SAT Plus

==== Discovery, Inc. ====
- Animal Planet (subtitles in Serbia/Croatia)
- Crime & Investigation (subtitles in Serbia/Croatia)
- Discovery Channel Europe (subtitles in Serbia/Croatia)
- Discovery HD (subtitles in Serbia/Croatia)
- Investigation Discovery (subtitles in Serbia/Croatia)
- Discovery ID Xtra (HD) (subtitles in Serbia/Croatia)
- Discovery Science (HD) (subtitles in Serbia/Croatia)
- Discovery World (subtitles in Serbia/Croatia)
- TLC (subtitles in Serbia/Croatia)
- Travel Channel International (subtitles in Serbia/Croatia)
- Eurosport 1 (subtitles in Serbia/Croatia)
- Eurosport 2 (subtitles in Serbia/Croatia)
- Eurosport News (subtitles in Serbia/Croatia)

==== Viasat Broadcasting ====
- TV1000 (subtitles in Serbia/Croatia)
- Viasat History (subtitles in Serbia/Croatia)
- Viasat Explore (subtitles in Serbia/Croatia)
- Viasat Nature (subtitles in Serbia/Croatia)

==== Arena Sport ====
- Arena Sport 1 BiH (program in Bosnia and Herzegovina)
- Arena Sport 1 SRB (audio in Serbia/Croatia)
- Arena Sport 1 HR (audio in Serbia/Croatia)
- Arena Sport 2 (audio in Serbia/Croatia)
- Arena Sport 3 (audio in Serbia/Croatia)
- Arena Sport 4 (audio in Serbia/Croatia)
- Arena Sport 5 (audio in Serbia/Croatia)

==== Fox Networks Group Europe ====
- FOX (HD) (subtitles in Serbia/Croatia)
- FOX Crime (HD) (subtitles in Serbia/Croatia)
- FOX Life (HD) (subtitles in Serbia/Croatia)
- 24Kitchen (HD) (subtitles in Serbia/Croatia)
- National Geographic Channel (HD) (subtitles in Serbia/Croatia)
- National Geographic Wild (HD) (subtitles in Serbia/Croatia)

==== AMC Networks International Zone ====
- AMC (subtitles in Serbia/Croatia)
- CBS Drama (subtitles in Serbia/Croatia)
- CBS Reality (subtitles in Serbia/Croatia)
- Crime & Investigation Network (subtitles in Serbia/Croatia)
- Da Vinci Learning (subtitles in Serbia/Croatia)
- Extreme Sports Channel (subtitles in Serbia/Croatia)
- Fine Living Network (subtitles in Serbia/Croatia)
- Food Network (subtitles in Serbia/Croatia)
- History (HD) (subtitles in Serbia/Croatia)
- JimJam (subtitles in Serbia/Croatia)
- Outdoor Channel (HD) (subtitles in Serbia/Croatia)

==== HBO Europe ====
- HBO (HD) (subtitles in Serbia/Croatia)
- HBO 2 (HD) (subtitles in Serbia/Croatia)
- HBO 3 (HD) (subtitles in Serbia/Croatia)
- Cinemax (HD) (subtitles in Serbia/Croatia)
- Cinemax 2 (HD) (subtitles in Serbia/Croatia)

==== TRT ====
- TRT Haber
- TRT World
- TRT Avaz

==== MTV ====
- MTV Europe (subtitles in Serbia/Croatia)
- MTV Rocks (UK version)
- MTV Dance (UK version)
- MTV Hits (UK version)
- MTV Base (UK Version)
- MTV Live HD (UK Version)
- VH-1 (European) * VH-1 Classic (European)
- Nickelodeon (Audio in Croatian/Serbian)

==== Cinestar ====
- Cinestar TV (subtitles in Croatia)
- Cinestar Action (subtitles in Croatia)
- Cinestar Fantasy (subtitles in Croatia)
- Cinestar Comedy (subtitles in Croatia)
- Cinestar Premiere 1 HD (subtitles in Croatia)
- Cinestar Premiere 2 HD (subtitles in Croatia)

==== RTL Group ====
- RTL Televizija (subtitles in Croatia)
- RTL 2 HR (subtitles in Croatia)
- RTL Kockica (subtitles in Croatia)
- RTL Living (subtitles in Croatia)
- RTL Passion (subtitles in Croatia)
- RTL Crime (subtitles in Croatia)
- RTL Croatia World (subtitles in Croatia)
- RTL Television (audio in Germany)
- VOX (audio in Germany)
- Super RTL (audio in Germany)

==== Hrvatska radiotelevizija ====
- HRT 1
- HRT 2
- HRT 3
- HRT 4
- HRT 5

==== Radio Televizija Srbije ====
- RTS Svet
- RTS1
- RTS2
- RTS Život
- RTS Drama
- RTS Kolo
- RTS Trezor
- RTS Muzika

==== FilmBox ====
- FilmBox
- FilmBox Extra HD
- FilmBox Family
- FilmBox Plus
- FilmBox Premium
- FightBox
- Fast&FunBox
- Gametoon HD
- FilmBox Art House
- DocuBox HD
- FashionBox
- 360TuneBox
- Erox
- Eroxxx HD

==== AXN Networks ====
- AXN (subtitles in Serbia/Croatia)
- AXN Black (subtitles in Serbia/Croatia)
- AXN White (subtitles in Serbia/Croatia)

==== Disney Channel Europe ====
- Disney Channel (subtitles in Serbia/Croatia)
- Disney Junior (subtitles in Serbia/Croatia)

==== Pink Media Group ====
- RTV Pink
- Pink Media BH (newscast in Bosnia and Herzegovina)
- Pink Media (newscast in Montenegro)
- Pink 2
- Pink 3 Info
- Pink Action (subtitles in Serbia)
- Pink Bravo Music
- Pink Classic (subtitles in Serbia)
- Pink Comedy (subtitles in Serbia)
- Pink Crime & Mystery (subtitles in Serbia)
- Pink Extra
- Pink Family (subtitles in Serbia)
- Pink Fashion (subtitles in Serbia)
- Pink Fight Network
- Pink Film
- Pink Folk
- Pink Folk 2
- Pink Hits 1
- Pink Hits 2
- Pink Horor
- Pink Kids
- Pink Koncert
- Pink Kuvar
- Pink Life Style (subtitles in Serbia)
- Pink Movies (subtitles in Serbia)
- Pink Music
- Pink Music 2
- Pink n Roll
- Pink Parada
- Pink Pedia (subtitles in Serbia)
- Pink Plus
- Pink Premium (subtitles in Serbia)
- Pink Reality
- Pink Romance (subtitles in Serbia)
- Pink Sci Fi & Fantasy (subtitles in Serbia)
- Pink Serije (subtitles in Serbia)
- Pink Show
- Pink Soap (subtitles in Serbia)
- Pink Super Kids
- Pink Thriller (subtitles in Serbia)
- Pink Western (subtitles in Serbia)
- Pink World
- Pink World Cinema
- Pink Zabava
- Pink HAHA
- Pink LOL

== Digital television transition in BiH ==
The process of digitization is still going on. Communications Regulatory Agency of BiH issued the first licences for digital broadcasting in BiH to broadcasters BHRT, RTVFBiH and RTRS.

Permits are valid from March 1, 2016.

Council of Ministers of BiH has decided to use the DVB-T2 standard for digital TV services in all nine allotments.

First stage of the transition to digital broadcasting covered Sarajevo, Mostar and Banja Luka and was completed on 14 October 2016. During this test phase, in some parts of the country, programmes from the public broadcasters (BHRT, FTV and RTRS) are broadcasting in digital form where equipment has been installed. The signal can also be received in the surrounding cities (Ilijaš, Visoko, Pale, Istočno Sarajevo, Prijedor, Gradiška, Laktaši, Čelinac and places in the Neretva river valley towards Čapljina) and places with optical visibility at the emission locations. Due to the abolition of the old analogue frequency for the purposes of digital, one commercial station temporarily emits digital signal in Banja Luka area. (K3 Prnjavor).

The second and third phase will cover six remaining areas for completing MUX-A in the whole territory of the country. That process will be completed after tender procedure. MUX-B is intended for privately owned and regional TV stations.

== Most-viewed channels in BiH ==
By 2012, information from MARECO INDEX BOSNIA (TNS) was used, and after 2014, survey data from Audience Measurement (Nielsen) is used.

=== Annual viewership overview ===
Annual viewership overview:

Audience share % (4+)
Channel	2010	2011	2012	2013	2014	2015	2016	2017	2018	2023
BHT1	6.2	6.8	5.7	—N/a	6.41	5.3	—N/a	3.45	4.3	3.2
FTV	14.9	14.5	14.4	—N/a	12.94	11.9	10.65	9.44	10.4	4.1
RTRS	6.0	5.2	5.1	—N/a	5.69	6.1	6.34	6.49	6.4	4.2
OBN	6.4	10.4	8.5	—N/a	8.23	10.3	11.91	9.01	6.7	5.9
Nova BH	14.4	10.9	9.5	—N/a	9.23	9.9	8.31	6.09	8.6	11.8
Hayat	7.8	7.8	7.7	—N/a	5.99	6.0	—N/a	2.99	2.7	3.9
BN TV	4.2	6.3	7.0	—N/a	5.69	6.6	—N/a	6.20	6.5	6.0
ATV	4.4	5.2	4.0	—N/a	2.85	—N/a	—N/a	—N/a	—N/a	1.0
O Kanal	—N/a	—N/a	—N/a	—N/a	2.85	—N/a	—N/a	—N/a	—N/a	0.7

== Defunct television channels in BiH ==
Defunct television channels in Bosnia and Herzegovina (Analog television, Cable television, Satellite television, IPTV)
Television channel	Headquarters	Programming	Transmission	Launched	End	Notes
RTV Maglaj	Maglaj	Local	Cable TV	1992	2026	* Lost licence from the CRA BiH
tß1	Trebinje	Local	Cable TV	2016	2026	* Lost licence from the CRA BiH
Kontakt TV	Banja Luka	Local	Cable TV	2015	2026	* Lost licence from the CRA BiH
NTV Patria	Doboj	Local	Cable TV	2003	2025	* Lost licence from the CRA BiH
Al Jazeera Balkans	Sarajevo	Regional	Cable TV	2011	2025	* Stopped broadcasting on 01.08.2025.
ELTA TV	Banja Luka	Local	Cable TV	2010	2025	* Stopped broadcasting on 01.07.2025.
Moj Astrolog	Banja Luka	Local	Cable TV	2022	2025	* became Ona TV
ELTA 2	Tuzla	Local	Cable TV	2012	2025	* Lost licence from the CRA BiH
SII-LED channel	Matuzići	Local	Cable TV	2021	2025	* Lost licence from the CRA BiH
Happy Puppy TV	Banja Luka	Local	Cable TV	2023	2024	* became Happy Dog TV
Serbia World TV	Banja Luka	Local	Cable TV	2014	2024	* became RTV Puls
WTV	Gračanica	Local	Cable TV	2016	2024	* Lost licence from the CRA BiH
UNA TV	Banja Luka	Regional	Cable and Terrestrial Digital TV	2021	2024	* Closed because of OFAC sanctions
Hayat Plus	Sarajevo	Local	Cable TV	2006	2024	became Hayat 2
Hayat Music	Sarajevo	Local	Cable TV	2011	2024	became Hayat Music Box
Hayat Folk	Tešanj	Local	Cable TV	2011	2024	became Hayat Folk Box
NTV Amna	Tešanj	Local	Analog TV	1997	2024	* Lost licence from the CRA BiH
TV Bel Kanal	Banja Luka	Local	Analog TV	1997	2024	* Lost licence from the CRA BiH
RTV Slobomir	Slobomir	Local	Analog TV	2005	2024	* Lost licence from the CRA BiH
Vikom TV	Bosanska Gradiška	Local	Analog TV	1997	2023	* Lost licence from the CRA BiH
Večernji TV	Mostar	Local	Internet TV	2021	2023	
BONA TV	Sarajevo	Local	Internet TV	2023	2023	became Dobra TV
Illyricum TV	Sarajevo	Local	Internet TV	2023	2023	became BONA TV
NTV 101	Prijedor	Local	Analog TV	1998	2023	became Illyricum TV
Prva BH	Sarajevo	Regional	Analog TV	2021	2023	* Lost licence from the CRA BiH
BDC Televizija	Brčko	Local	Cable TV	2009	2022	* Lost licence from the CRA BiH
NTV Jasmin	Vitez	Local	Analog TV	1998	2022	became Prva BH
Vikom Music	Bosanska Gradiška	Music	Cable TV	2013	2022	became RTV Vikom
Info Plus	Gradiška	Local	Cable TV	2004	2022	
Televizija Adria	Pale	Local	Cable TV	-	2022	* Lost licence from the CRA BiH
RA-TV	Tešanj	Local	Cable TV	2013	2021	became SII-LED channel
Inicijativa TV	Sarajevo	Regional	Internet TV	2012	2021	
HTV Oscar C	Mostar	Local	Analog TV	1994	2021	became RTV Herceg-Bosne
OSM TV	Pale	Local	Analog TV	1993	2021	became RTV IS - TV Istočno Sarajevo has new owner and it is different TV station then previous TV Istočno Sarajevo channel
MIR TV Europa	Tuzla	Local	Cable TV	2016	2020	became Super Media TV
BN Sat	Bijeljina	Local	Satellite TV	2004	2020	became BN 2
DF TV	Banja Luka	Music	Cable TV	2019	2020	
Keno TV	Banja Luka	Gambling	Cable TV	2020	2020	
RTV BIR	Sarajevo	Local	Cable TV	2013	2020	became BIR TV HD - this was radio stream with static pictures on TV channel
Televizija IN	Bijeljina	Local	Cable TV	2005	2020	* Closed at New Year's Eve of 2020
TV1	Sarajevo	Regional	Analog TV	2010	2019	became O Kanal
Naša TV	Mostar	Local	Cable TV	2016	2019	became RTV Herceg-Bosne
TV KISS	Kiseljak	Local	Analog TV	1992	2019	became RTV Herceg-Bosne
Prvi TV	Mostar	Local	Internet TV	2014	2019	became RTV Herceg-Bosne
A1 TV	Sarajevo	Local	Cable TV	2016	2019	became Dobra TV
Televizija Istočno Sarajevo	Sarajevo	Local	Cable TV	2008	2018	became RTV IS
OTV Valentino Sat	Brčko	Local	Satellite TV	2018	2018	
KG-1 TV	Goražde	Local	Cable TV	-	2018	
VIP TV	Prijedor	Local	Cable TV	-	2018	
Pink Media BH	Sarajevo	Regional	Cable TV	2018	2018	Now Pink BH
Pink BH	Sarajevo	Regional	Analog TV	2003	2018	Now Nova BH
RTM Mostar	Mostar	Local	Analog TV	1995	2018	* Lost licence from the CRA BiH
TV VI-NET	Visoko	Local	Cable TV	-	2018	
Valentino Folk	Brčko	Local	Cable TV	-	2017	
Centralne Nacionalne Novosti	Sarajevo	Local	Cable TV	2012	2017	Merged with TV1
Behar TV	Sarajevo	Local	Analog TV	2008	2016	
Art INFO	Kiseljak	Local	Cable TV	-	2016	
OBN+	Sarajevo	Reruns	Satellite TV	2015	2016	
K3 Sat	Prnjavor	Local	Satellite TV	2013	2015	
Druga TV	Tuzla	Local	Cable TV	2012	2015	
HTV Oscar 2	Mostar	Music	Cable TV	2001	2015	
Kanal 1	Sarajevo	Music	Cable TV	2010	2015	
TV Džungla	Doboj	Local	Cable TV	-	2013	
037 Televizija	Bihać	Local	Cable TV	2010	2013	
TVT Tuzla	Tuzla	Local	Analog TV	1991	2013	
VIK-televizija	Vlasenica	Local	Analog TV	-	2013	
Program Plus	Sarajevo	Regional	Analog TV	2011	2012	
Hercegovačka televizija	Mostar	Local	Analog TV	2002	2012	* Lost licence from the CRA BiH
NTV Travnik	Travnik	Local	Analog TV	1995	2012	
NTV Studio 99	Sarajevo	Local	Analog TV	1992	2011	Now Al Jazeera Balkans
Nova Mreža	Sarajevo	Regional	Analog TV	2011	2011	became Mreža TV
Mreža plus	Sarajevo	Regional	Analog TV	2001	2011	
Balkan TV	Pale	Local	Analog TV	-	2009	
Televizija X	Sarajevo	Local	Analog TV	2000	2008	Now Behar TV
NTV Hayat SAT	Sarajevo	Local	Cable TV	2002	2006	Hayat Plus
NTV Zetel	Zenica	Local	Analog TV	2000	2005	
BHTV1/PBS BiH	Sarajevo	National	Analog TV	1998	2004	became BHT1
RTV Alfa	Sarajevo	Local	Analog TV	1999	2004	Now TV Alfa
RTV Glas Bosne	Sarajevo	Local	Analog TV	-	2004	
NTV Patria	Doboj	Local	Analog TV	-	2003	Merged with Pink BH - available as a Cable TV channel
RTV Kometa	Pale	Local	Analog TV	-	2003	Merged with Pink BH
RTV Step	Bijeljina	Local	Analog TV	1998	2003	Merged with Pink BH
TV GLS	Sokolac	Local	Analog TV	-	2003	Merged with Pink BH
FTV 2	Sarajevo	FBiH entity	Analog TV	2001	2003	
FTV 1	Sarajevo	FBiH entity	Analog TV	2001	2003	became FTV
NRTV Banja Luka	Banja Luka	Local	Analog TV	1995	2003	Merged with Pink BH
RTV Tomislavgrad	Tomislavgrad	Local	Analog TV	-	2003	
RTV Grad	Sarajevo	Local	Analog TV	-	2002	
TV IC 7	Kakanj	Local	Analog TV	1994	2002	became NTV IC Kakanj
TB C1	Banja Luka	Local	Analog TV	1996	2002	became TV Simić
RTV PiM	Bijeljina	Local	Analog TV	-	2002	
RTRS TV SiM	Bijeljina	Local	Analog TV	-	2002	became RTRS
HTV Mostar	Mostar	Local	Analog TV	1998	2002	became Hercegovačka televizija
HRTV Herceg Bosna	Mostar	Local	Analog TV	-	2002	
RTV Info Tes	Teslić	Local	Analog TV	-	2002	Merged with Pink BH
RTV Maoča	Brčko	Local	Analog TV	-	2002	
TV Žepče	Žepče	Local	Analog TV	-	2002	
RTV Kladanj	Kladanj	Local	Analog TV	-	2002	
TV MIB	Brčko	Local	Analog TV	-	2002	
ATV Banovići	Banovići	Local	Analog TV	-	2002	
TV FS3	Tuzla	Local	Analog TV	1991	2002	
TV Studio Šamac	Bosanski Šamac	Local	Analog TV	-	2002	
RTV Srebrenica	Srebrenica	Local	Analog TV	-	2002	
TV Srpski Glas	Zvornik	Local	Analog TV	1992	2002	
RTV Zvornik	Zvornik	Local	Analog TV	-	2002	
RTV Ljubinje	Ljubinje	Local	Analog TV	-	2002	Merged with Pink BH
TV Teodora	Banja Luka	Local	Analog TV	-	2002	Merged with Pink BH
Hrvatska televizija Široki Brijeg	Široki Brijeg	Local	Analog TV	-	2002	
RTV Bihać	Bihać	Local	Analog TV	-	2002	
Kanal V 7	Vitez	Local	Analog TV	-	2002	
RTV Zavidovići	Zavidovići	Local	Analog TV	-	2002	
RTV Donji Vakuf	Donji Vakuf	Local	Analog TV	-	2002	
RTV Gornji Vakuf	Gornji Vakuf	Local	Analog TV	-	2002	
HRTV Jajce	Jajce	Local	Analog TV	-	2002	
RTV Konjic	Konjic	Local	Analog TV	-	2002	
RTV Big	Banja Luka	Local	Analog TV	-	2002	
TV Gvozden	Gradiška	Local	Analog TV	1996	2002	* Lost licence from the CRA BiH
RTV Birač	Milići	Local	Analog TV	-	2002	
Hrvatska radio-televizija Novi Travnik	Novi Travnik	Local	Analog TV	-	2002	
TV Fenix	Maglaj	Local	Analog TV	1992	2001	became RTV Maglaj
RTV Livno	Livno	Local	Analog TV	-	2001	
NTV Vitez	Vitez	Local	Analog TV	1994	2001	became NTV Jasmin
HRTV Kiseljak	Kiseljak	Local	Analog TV	1991	2001	became TV KISS
NTV D Doboj	Doboj	Local	Analog TV	1987	2001	
Muslimanska Televizija Igman	Pazarić	Local	Analog TV	1993	2000	became MTV Igman
RTV Sveti Georgije	Banja Luka	Local & Katolic	Analog TV	1997	2001	* Lost licence from the CRA BiH
TV Silva	N/A	Local	Analog TV	-	2000	
RTV Višegrad	Višegrad	Local	Analog TV	-	2000	
Kanal S	Pale	Local	Analog TV	1992	1999	became RTRS
Televizija Republike Srpske (TVRS)	Banja Luka	Local	Analog TV	1999	1999	became RTRS
SRT-Sa	Sarajevo	Local	Analog TV	-	1999	became RTRS
Srpska Radio Televizija (SRT)	Banja Luka	Local	Analog TV	1993	1999	became Televizija Republike Srpske (TVRS)
Erotel	Mostar	parts of FBiH entity	Analog TV	1996	1999	* Lost licence from the CRA BiH, later became FTV 2
BRT International	Sarajevo	Local	Analog TV	1990	1999	* Lost licence from the CRA BiH
BHT	Sarajevo	National	Analog TV	1995	1998	became BHTV1/PBS BiH
TVIN	Sarajevo	Local	Analog TV	1996	1998	became OBN
RTV Tešanj	Tešanj	Local	Analog TV	-	1998	
Fiva TV/TV Dobrinja	Sarajevo	Local	Analog TV	-	1997	
TV Ljiljan	Sarajevo	Local	Analog TV	-	1996	became BRT International
TV Tuzlansko-podrinjskog kantona	Tuzla	Local	Analog TV	1994	1996	became RTV TK
Televizija Okruga Zenica	Zenica	Local	Analog TV	-	1996	became RTV Zenica
RTV BiH/tvbih	Sarajevo	National	Analog TV	1992	1995	became BHT
Televizija Okruga Tuzla	Tuzla	Local	Analog TV	1993	1994	became TV Tuzlansko-podrinjskog kantona
Srpska Televizija (STV)	Banja Luka	Local	Analog TV	1993	1993	became Srpska Radio Televizija (SRT)
RTV Krajina Banja Luka	Banja Luka	Local	Analog TV	1993	1993	became Srpska Televizija (STV)
TV Banja Luka	Banja Luka	Local	Analog TV	1992	1993	became Srpska Televizija (STV)
TV Dobre vibracije	Sarajevo	Local	Analog TV	-	1992	
TV Sarajevo 3	Sarajevo	National	Analog TV	1989	1992	
TV Sarajevo 2	Sarajevo	National	Analog TV	1975	1992	
TV Sarajevo	Sarajevo	National	Analog TV	1961	1992	became RTV BiH/tvbih

== See also ==
- List of cable television companies in BiH
- List of radio stations in Bosnia and Herzegovina
