= List of Bosnian-language television channels =

This is a list of television channels that broadcast in Bosnian language:

== List of television channels in Bosnia and Herzegovina ==
Television channels in Bosnia and Herzegovina (Analog television, Cable television, Satellite television, IPTV)
Name	Network	Public/Private	Broadcast range	Programming	Headquarters	Founded	Transmission	Teletext	HD	Web	Notes
BHT 1	Radio and Television of Bosnia and Herzegovina (BHRT)	Public TV tax	Bosnia and Herzegovina	General	Sarajevo	1961	Analog television	Yes	Yes	www.bhrt.ba	National broadcaster and member of the EBU
FTV	Radio-Television of the Federation of Bosnia and Herzegovina (RTV FBiH)	Public TV tax	BIH	General	Sarajevo	2001	Analog television	Yes	No	www.federalna.ba	Entity level public broadcaster
RTRS.tv	Radio Televizija Republike Srpske (RTRS)	Public TV tax	BIH	General	Banja Luka	1992	Analog television	Yes	No	www.rtrs.tv	Entity level public broadcaster
RTRS PLUS	Radio Televizija Republike Srpske (RTRS)	Public TV tax	Bosnia and Herzegovina	Documentary	Banja Luka	2015	Cable television	No	No	plus.rtrs.tv	* No data in CRA register
Hayat	Hayat TV	Private	BiH	General	Sarajevo	1992	Analog television	Yes	Yes	www.hayat.ba	Transmitting syndicated program called Program Plus
Alternativna TV	ATV	Private	BiH	General	Banja Luka	1996	Analog television	Yes	No	www.atvbl.com	Transmitting syndicated program called Program Plus
OBN	OBN Televizija	Private	BiH	General	Sarajevo	1996	Analog television	Yes	No	www.obn.ba	Transmitting syndicated program with BN Televizija
Nova BH	United Group	Private	BiH	General	Sarajevo	2018	Analog television	Yes	No	www.novabh.tv	
BN Televizija	RTV BN	Private	BIH	General	Bijeljina	1998	Analog television	Yes	No	www.rtvbn.com	Transmitting syndicated program with OBN
BN Televizija	RTV BN	Private	BiH	General	Bijeljina		Cable television	Yes	No	www.rtvbn.com	* Data from CRA register
O Kanal	O Kanal	Private	BiH	Infotainment	Sarajevo	2010	Analog television	Yes	No	www.okanal.ba	Transmitting syndicated program called Mreža TV
Al Jazeera Balkans	Al Jazeera Media Network	Private	BiH	News	Sarajevo	2011	Analog television	Yes	Yes	www.balkans.aljazeera.net	
Face TV	Face TV	Private	BiH	General	Sarajevo	2012	Cable television	No	Yes	www.facetv.ba	
N1 BiH	United Group	Private	BiH *	News	Sarajevo	2014	Cable television	No	Yes	www.ba.n1info.com	* No data in CRA register
Hayat Music	Hayat TV	Private	BiH	Music	Vogošća	2012	Cable television	No	Yes	www.hayat.ba	
Hayat Folk	Hayat TV	Private	BiH	Music	Vogošća	2012	Cable television	No	Yes	www.hayat.ba	
Hayat Plus	Hayat TV	Private	BiH	Bosnian diaspora	Vogošća	2002	Cable television	No	Yes	www.hayat.ba	
Hayatovci	Hayat TV	Private	BiH	Kids	Vogošća	2014	Cable television	No	Yes	www.hayat.ba	
TVSA	Televizija Kantona Sarajevo	Public	Sarajevo Canton	Regional	Sarajevo	1998	Analog television	No	No	www.tvsa.ba	Transmitting syndicated program called BH Veza
RTV USK	Televizija USK	Public	Una-Sana Canton	Regional	Bihać	1995	Analog television	No	Yes	www.rtvusk.ba	Transmitting syndicated program called BH Veza
RTV TK	Televizija Tuzlanskog kantona	Public	Tuzla Canton	Regional	Tuzla	1993	Analog television	No	No	www.rtvtk.ba	Transmitting syndicated program called BH Veza
RTV Zenica	Televizija Zenica	Public	Zenica-Doboj Canton	Regional	Zenica	1993	Analog television	No	No	www.rtvze.ba	Transmitting syndicated program called BH Veza
RTV BPK	Televizija BPK Goražde	Public	Bosnian Podrinje Canton	Regional	Goražde	1996	Analog television	No	No	www.rtvbpk.com	Transmitting syndicated program called BH Veza
RTV HB	Radiotelevizija Herceg-Bosne (RTVHB)	Public	BiH	General	Mostar	1992	Analog television	No	Yes	www.rtv-hb.com	
RTV Vogošća	Televizija Vogošća	Public	Vogošća	Local	Vogošća	1996	Analog television	No	No	www.rtvvogosca.com.ba	
RTV Cazin	Televizija Cazin	Public	Cazin	Local	Cazin	1993	Analog television	No	No	www.rtvcazin.ba	
RTV Visoko	Televizija Visoko	Public	Visoko	Local	Visoko	1994	Analog television	No	No	www.rtv-visoko.ba	
RTV Bugojno	Televizija Bugojno	Public	Bugojno	Local	Bugojno	1993	Analog television	No	No	www.rtvbugojno.ba	Transmitting syndicated program called Program Plus
TV Prijedor	Televizija Prijedor	Public	Prijedor	Local	Prijedor	2000	Analog television	No	No	www.rtvprijedor.com	
TV Rudo	Televizija Rudo	Public	Rudo	Local	Rudo	1993	Analog television	No	No		
RTV Živinice	Televizija Živinice	Public	Živinice	Local	Živinice	1992	Analog television	No	No	www.rtvzivinice.tv	
Kanal 6	Kanal 6 D.O.O.	Private	BiH	Local	Travnik	2013	Cable television	No	Yes	www.kanal6.ba	
Behar TV	Televizija Behar	Private	Sarajevo	Local	Sarajevo	2008	Analog television	No	No	www.behartv.com	
TV Alfa	Televizija Alfa	Private	Sarajevo	Local	Sarajevo		Analog television	No	No	www.tvalfa.ba	Transmitting syndicated program called Mreža TV
MTV Igman	MTV Igman	Private	Sarajevo	Religious	Pazarić	1993	Analog television	No	Yes		
OSM TV	Televizija OSM	Private	Istočno Sarajevo	Local	Pale	1993	Analog television	No	No	www.osmtv.com	Transmitting local syndicated program called PRIMA mreža
RTV IS	RTV Istočno Sarajevo	Public	Istočno Sarajevo	Local	Istočno Sarajevo	2008	Cable television	No	No	www.rtvis.tv	
NTVIC Kakanj	NTVIC Kakanj	Private	Kakanj	Local	Kakanj	1994	Analog television	No	No	www.ntvic.ba	
NTV Jasmin	NTV Jasmin	Private	Central Bosnia Canton	Local	Vitez	1998	Analog television	No	No	www.tvjasmin.com	
NTV Amna	NTV Amna	Private	Tešanj	Local	Tešanj	1997	Analog television	No	No		
NTV Arena	NTV Arena	Private	Bijeljina	Local	Bijeljina	1999	Analog television	No	No	www.ntvarena.ba	Transmitting local syndicated program called PRIMA mreža
NTV 101	NTV 101	Private	Sanski Most	Local	Sanski Most	1998	Analog television	No	Yes	www.ntv101.tv	
TV Bel Kanal	TV Bel Kanal	Private	Banja Luka	Local	Banja Luka	2003	Analog television	No	No	www.belkanal.tv	Transmitting local syndicated program called PRIMA mreža
CNNRS	CNNRS	Private	Banja Luka	Local	Bosanska Gradiška	2012	Analog television	No	No	www.cnnrs.com	
BN Music	RTV BN	Private	BiH	Music	Bijeljina	1998	Cable television	No	No	www.bn-music.com	
Cinema TV	Cinema TV	Private	BiH	Movies	Sarajevo	2013	Cable television	No	No		
M1 FILM	M1 FILM	Private	BiH	Movies	Sarajevo	2015	Cable television	No	No	www.m1film.hr	
M1 GOLD	M1 FILM	Private	BiH	Movies	Sarajevo	2015	Cable television	No	No	www.m1film.hr	
RTV Vikom	Televizija Vikom	Private	Banja Luka	Local	Bosanska Gradiška	1996	Analog television	No	No	www.vikom.tv	
Vikom Music	RTV Vikom	Private	Banja Luka	Music	Bosanska Gradiška	2013	Cable television	No	No	www.vikom.tv	
TV Simić	Televizija Simić	Private	Banja Luka	Local	Banja Luka	1996	Analog television	No	No	www.tvsimic.com	
RTV Kozarska Dubica	RTV Kozarska Dubica	Public	Kozarska Dubica	Local	Kozarska Dubica		Cable television	No	No		
RTV Doboj	RTV Doboj	Public	Doboj	Local	Doboj		Cable television	No	No	www.rtvdoboj.com	
TV Kanal 3	TV Kanal 3	Private	Prnjavor	Local	Prnjavor	1995	Analog television	No	No	www.tvk3.info	Transmitting syndicated program called Mreža TV
Herceg TV	Herceg Televizija	Private	Trebinje	Local	Trebinje	2008	Analog television	No	No	www.herceg.tv	Transmitting local syndicated program called PRIMA mreža
HTV Oscar C	HTV Oscar C	Private	Herzegovina-Neretva Canton	Local	Mostar	1994	Analog television	No	No	www.htvoscarc.com	
TV HIT	RTV HIT	Private	Brčko District	Local	Brčko		Analog television	No	No	www.rtvhit.com	Transmitting syndicated program called Mreža TV
Posavina TV	Posavina TV	Private	Posavina Canton	Local	Brčko	2009	Cable television	No	No	www.posavinatv.com	
RTV Slobomir	Televizija Slobomir	Private	Bijeljina	Local	Slobomir	2005	Analog television	No	No	www.rtvslobomir.com	
TV Slon Extra	TV Slon Extra	Private	Tuzla	Local	Tuzla		Analog television	No	No	www.rtvslon.ba	Transmitting syndicated program called Mreža TV
RTV Maglaj	Televizija Maglaj	Private	Maglaj	Local	Maglaj		Analog television	No	No	www.rtv-maglaj.com	Transmitting syndicated program called Program Plus
Obiteljska televizija Valentino	DENI-COMPANI	Private	Brčko District	Local	Brčko		Analog television	No	No	www.valentinobh.com	
OTV Valentino	DENI-COMPANI	Private	BiH	Music	Brčko		Cable television	No	No	www.valentinobh.com	
VALENTINO ETNO	DENI-COMPANI	Private	BiH	Music	Brčko	2014	Cable television	No	No	www.valentinobh.com	
VALENTINO MUSIC	DENI-COMPANI	Private	BiH	Music	Brčko	2014	Cable television	No	Yes	www.valentinobh.com	
PRVA HERCEGOVAČKA	DENI-COMPANI	Private	BiH	Music	Brčko	2015	Cable television	No	No	www.valentinobh.com	
Sevdah TV	Kanal 6 D.O.O.	Private	BiH	Music	Travnik	2015	Cable television	No	No	www.tnt.ba	
IZVORNA TV	Retro Media	Private	BiH	Music	Živinice	2015	Cable television	No	No	www.izvornatv.com	
RTV 7 Tuzla	Radio Televizija 7	Public	Tuzla	Local	Tuzla	2007	Cable television	No	No	www.rtvtk.ba	
RTV Jablanica	Radiotelevizija Jablanica	Public	Jablanica	Local	Jablanica	1999	Cable television	No	No	www.jablanica.ba	
TV Lukavac	TV Lukavac	Public	Lukavac	Local	Lukavac		Cable television	No	No	www.rtvlukavac.ba	
Hema TV	Hema TV	Private	Sarajevo	Local	Sarajevo	2008	Cable television	No	No	www.hematv.ba	
HEMA HD	GROHS H&G	Private	Sarajevo	Local	Sarajevo	2015	Cable television	No	Yes	www.hs-hkb.ba	
Smart TV Tešanj	Smart TV	Private	Tešanj	Local	Tešanj		Cable television	No	No	www.tvsmart.ba	
ELTA 1 HD	Stjena Herc	Private	Banja Luka	Local	Ljubinje	2010	Cable television	No	Yes	www.elta-televizija.com	
ELTA 2	ELTA MT	Private	Tuzla	Local	Ljubinje	2010	Cable television	No	No	www.eltatv.net	
BDC Televizija	BDC Televizija	Private	Brčko District	Local	Brčko	2009	Cable television	No	No	www.brcko.tv	
City TV	SEB Group	Private	Mostar	Local	Mostar	2015	Cable television	No	No	www.citytv.ba	Transmitting syndicated program called BH Veza
NEON TV	NEON TV	Private	Kalesija	Local	Kalesija	2014	Cable television	No	Yes	www.neon.ba	
IN Televizija	IN Televizija	Private	Bijeljina	Local	Bijeljina	2008	Cable television	No	No	www.intelevizija.com	
Info Plus	INFO PLUS	Private	Bosanska Gradiška	Local	Bosanska Gradiška	2004	Cable television	No	No	www.gradiska.tv	
Art INFO	Art Company	Private	Kiseljak	Local	Kiseljak		Cable television	No	No	www.artinfo.ba	
Inicijativa TV	Inicijativa TV	Private	Tuzla	Local	Tuzla	2012	Cable television	No	No	www.inicijativa.ba	
KG-1	KG-1	Private	Goražde	Local	Goražde		Cable television	No	No		
KTV Zavidovići	KTV Zavidovići	Private	Zavidovići	Local	Zavidovići		Cable television	No	No		
RA-TV	RA- TV	Private	Tešanj	Local	Jelah	2013	Cable television	No	No	www.tvra.blogger.ba	
TV Slon Info	TV Slon Info	Private	Tuzla	Local	Tuzla		Cable television	No	No	www.rtvslon.ba	
VIK Televizija	VIK Televizija	Public	Vlasenica	Local	Vlasenica	2010	Cable television	No	No		
TV VI-NET	TV VI-NET	Private	Visoko	Local	Visoko		Cable television	No	No	http://www.vinet-tv.ba/ www.vinet-tv.ba]	
NTV Patria	NTV Patria Doboj	Private	Doboj	Local	Doboj	1999	Cable television	No	No		
Kontakt TV	Kontakt TV	Private	Banja Luka	Local	Banja Luka	2015	Cable television	No	No	www.mojkontakt.com	
TNT Kids TV	Kanal 6 D.O.O.	Private	BiH	Kids	Travnik	2016	Cable television	No	No	www.tntkids.tv	
RTV Sana	RTV Sana	Public	Sanski Most	Local	Sanski Most	2016	Cable television	No	No	www.radiosana.ba	
Televizija 5	Balkan Media	Private	Sarajevo	Religious	Sarajevo	2016	Cable television	No	Yes	www.televizija5.ba	
TV Glas Drine	Glas Drine	Private	Sapna	Local	Sapna	2016	Cable television	No	Yes	www.radioglasdrine.com	
T£1	Callidus" d.o.o.	Private	Trebinje	Local	Trebinje	2015	Cable television	No	No		
DREAMPORN HD	Kanal 6 D.O.O.	Private	BiH	Adult Movies	Travnik	2016	Cable television	No	Yes	www.tnt.ba	
ELTA TELEVIZIJA	ELTA MEDIA GROUP	Private	Banja Luka	Local	Ljubinje	2010	Cable television	No	No	www.elta-televizija.com	
RTV BOKSIT	"Boksit" a.d. Milići	Private	Banja Luka	Local	Milići	2016	Cable television	No	No	www.ad-boksit.com	
Pink 2	Pink Media Group	Private	BiH	General	Sarajevo	2014	Cable television	Yes	No	www.pink.rs	
Pink 3 Info	Pink Media Group	Private	BiH	News	Sarajevo	2014	Cable television	No	No	www.pink.rs	
Pink Action	Pink Media Group	Private	BiH	Movies	Sarajevo	2014	Cable television	No	No	www.pink.rs	
Pink Bravo Music	Pink Media Group	Private	BiH	Music	Sarajevo	2014	Cable television	No	No	www.pink.rs	
Pink Classic	Pink Media Group	Private	BiH	Movies	Sarajevo	2014	Cable television	No	No	www.pink.rs	
Pink Comedy	Pink Media Group	Private	BiH	Movies	Sarajevo	2014	Cable television	No	No	www.pink.rs	
Pink Crime & Mystery	Pink Media Group	Private	BiH	Movies	Sarajevo	2014	Cable television	No	No	www.pink.rs	
Pink Erotic 1	Pink Media Group	Private	BiH	Adult Movies	Sarajevo	2014	Cable television	No	No	www.pink.rs	
Pink Erotic 2	Pink Media Group	Private	BiH	Adult Movies	Sarajevo	2014	Cable television	No	No	www.pink.rs	
Pink Erotic 3	Pink Media Group	Private	BiH	Adult Movies	Sarajevo	2014	Cable television	No	No	www.pink.rs	
Pink Erotic 4	Pink Media Group	Private	BiH	Adult Movies	Sarajevo	2014	Cable television	No	No	www.pink.rs	
Pink Erotic 5	Pink Media Group	Private	BiH	Adult Movies	Sarajevo	2014	Cable television	No	No	www.pink.rs	
Pink Erotic 6	Pink Media Group	Private	BiH	Adult Movies	Sarajevo	2014	Cable television	No	No	www.pink.rs	
Pink Erotic 7	Pink Media Group	Private	BiH	Adult Movies	Sarajevo	2014	Cable television	No	No	www.pink.rs	
Pink Erotic 8	Pink Media Group	Private	BiH	Adult Movies	Sarajevo	2014	Cable television	No	No	www.pink.rs	
Pink Extra	Pink Media Group	Private	BiH	Reruns	Sarajevo	2014	Cable television	No	No	www.pink.rs	
Pink Family	Pink Media Group	Private	BiH	Lifestyle	Sarajevo	2014	Cable television	No	No	www.pink.rs	
Pink Fashion	Pink Media Group	Private	BiH	Lifestyle	Sarajevo	2014	Cable television	No	No	www.pink.rs	
Pink Fight Network	Pink Media Group	Private	BiH	Sports	Sarajevo	2014	Cable television	No	No	www.pink.rs	
Pink Film	Pink Media Group	Private	BiH	Movies	Sarajevo	2014	Cable television	No	No	www.pink.rs	
Pink Folk	Pink Media Group	Private	BiH	Music	Sarajevo	2014	Cable television	No	No	www.pink.rs	
Pink Folk 2	Pink Media Group	Private	BiH	Music	Sarajevo	2014	Cable television	No	No	www.pink.rs	
Pink Hits 1	Pink Media Group	Private	BiH	Music	Sarajevo	2014	Cable television	No	No	www.pink.rs	
Pink Hits 2	Pink Media Group	Private	BiH	Music	Sarajevo	2014	Cable television	No	No	www.pink.rs	
Pink Horor	Pink Media Group	Private	BiH	Movies	Sarajevo	2014	Cable television	No	No	www.pink.rs	
Pink Kids	Pink Media Group	Private	BiH	Kids	Sarajevo	2014	Cable television	No	No	www.pink.rs	
Pink Koncert	Pink Media Group	Private	BiH	Music	Sarajevo	2014	Cable television	No	No	www.pink.rs	
Pink Kuvar	Pink Media Group	Private	BiH	Lifestyle	Sarajevo	2014	Cable television	No	No	www.pink.rs	
Pink Life Style	Pink Media Group	Private	BiH	Lifestyle	Sarajevo	2014	Cable television	No	No	www.pink.rs	
Pink Movies	Pink Media Group	Private	BiH	Movies	Sarajevo	2014	Cable television	No	No	www.pink.rs	
Pink Music	Pink Media Group	Private	BiH	Music	Sarajevo	2014	Cable television	No	No	www.pink.rs	
Pink Music 2	Pink Media Group	Private	BiH	Music	Sarajevo	2014	Cable television	No	No	www.pink.rs	
Pink n Roll	Pink Media Group	Private	BiH	Music	Sarajevo	2014	Cable television	No	No	www.pink.rs	
Pink Parada	Pink Media Group	Private	BiH	Music	Sarajevo	2014	Cable television	No	No	www.pink.rs	
Pink Pedia	Pink Media Group	Private	BiH	Documentary	Sarajevo	2014	Cable television	No	No	www.pink.rs	
Pink Plus	Pink Media Group	Private	BiH	Reruns	Sarajevo	2014	Cable television	No	No	www.pink.rs	
Pink Premium	Pink Media Group	Private	BiH	Movies	Sarajevo	2014	Cable television	No	No	www.pink.rs	
Pink Reality	Pink Media Group	Private	BiH	Reality	Sarajevo	2014	Cable television	No	No	www.pink.rs	
Pink Romance	Pink Media Group	Private	BiH	Movies	Sarajevo	2014	Cable television	No	No	www.pink.rs	
Pink Sci Fi & Fantasy	Pink Media Group	Private	BiH	Movies	Sarajevo	2014	Cable television	No	No	www.pink.rs	
Pink Serije	Pink Media Group	Private	BiH	TV series	Sarajevo	2014	Cable television	No	No	www.pink.rs	
Pink Show	Pink Media Group	Private	BiH	Lifestyle	Sarajevo	2014	Cable television	No	No	www.pink.rs	
Pink Soap	Pink Media Group	Private	BiH	TV series	Sarajevo	2014	Cable television	No	No	www.pink.rs	
Pink Super Kids	Pink Media Group	Private	BiH	Kids	Sarajevo	2014	Cable television	No	No	www.pink.rs	
Pink Thriller	Pink Media Group	Private	BiH	Movies	Sarajevo	2014	Cable television	No	No	www.pink.rs	
Pink Western	Pink Media Group	Private	BiH	Movies	Sarajevo	2014	Cable television	No	No	www.pink.rs	
Pink World	Pink Media Group	Private	BiH	Lifestyle	Sarajevo	2014	Cable television	No	No	www.pink.rs	
Pink World Cinema	Pink Media Group	Private	BiH	Movies	Sarajevo	2014	Cable television	No	No	www.pink.rs	
Pink Zabava	Pink Media Group	Private	BiH	Lifestyle	Sarajevo	2014	Cable television	No	No	www.pink.rs	
