= Moja TV =

Bosnian IPTV provider and subsidiary of BH Telecom

- Company type: Joint-stock company (Public)
- Industry: Telecommunication
- Founded: February 1, 2010
- Founder: BH Telecom
- Headquarters: Sarajevo, Bosnia and Herzegovina
- Area served: Bosnia and Herzegovina
- Products: MojaTV Phone MojaTV Net; MojaTV Full; MojaTV Premi; MojaTV Biz Moja TV Web
- Services: IPTV
- Parent: BH Telecom
- Website: mojatv.ba bhtelecom.ba

Moja TV is a Bosnian IPTV provider, subsidiary of the BH Telecom, which provides various thematic channels, HD and Timeshift channels, Video on demand, video recording, the use of an Electronic Program Guide (EPG) and other similar services. Customers must purchase or rent an IPTV set-top box and subscribe one of the four basic TV packages: Moja TV Phone, Moja TV Net, Moja TV Full and Moja TV Premi. There is also MojaTV Biz is a service designed for business customers.

A special Pay-per-view TV channels Moja TV Sport 1 and Moja TV Sport 2 are dedicated to the most attractive matches of the Premier League of Bosnia and Herzegovina. Moja TV Sport channels are the owners of TV rights for the football match between FK Sarajevo and FK Željezničar (Sarajevo's Derby match).

On 31 July 2012 BH Telecom signed a two-year deal with Football Federation of Bosnia and Herzegovina regarding the sponsorship and broadcasting rights of the league, effectively renaming the league to BH Telecom Premier League. The contract was extended in 2014, 2016, 2018 for another 2 years.

In all packages there are special TV channels that broadcast live pictures from 40 panoramic cameras from the major Bosnian cities and tourist destinations. Musical background consists of a program of national or local radio stations (BH Radio 1, RSG Radio etc.).

Moja TV HD package (with HD TV channels) costs about 4 KM (BAM) per month. Optional package with 20+ television channels (Pink + Package) costs 3.50 KM (BAM) per month while "Cinema TV" is charged separately for 1 KM per month.

All HBO and Cinemax channels costs about 10 KM (BAM) per month.

== Moja TV channel line-up ==
The program packages offered by Moja TV currently (as September 2020) offers more than 247 TV channels, 61 radio stations and 49 live city/panoramic cameras.

- 1. BHRT - BHT 1
- 2. Federalna TV
- 3. OBN
- 4. Hayat TV
- 5. Al Jazeera Balkans
- 6. BIR TV HD
- 7. Pink BH (ex. Pink Media BH)
- 8. TVSA
- 9. MTV Igman
- 10. Face TV
- 11. Imperia TV HD
- 12. RTV TK
- 13. RTV Slon
- 14. O Kanal
- 15. BN Televizija
- 16. NTV IC Kakanj
- 17. RTV Zenica
- 18. RTV USK
- 19. Alfa TV
- 20. Hayat Folk
- 21. Hayat Music
- 22. Hayat Plus
- 23. Alternativna TV
- 24. RTV Vogošća
- 25. RTV Visoko
- 26. RTV Maglaj
- 27. Kanal 6
- 28. RTRS
- 29. Elta 1
- 30. Izvorna TV
- 31. HIT TV
- 32. NTV Amna
- 33. RTV Lukavac
- 34. NTV Jata
- 35. NTV Jasmin
- 36. Smart TV
- 37. RTV BPK Goražde
- 38. RTV Cazin
- 39. Kanal 3
- 40. RTV Živinice
- 41. OSM TV
- 42. BDC TV
- 43. RTV Jablanica
- 44. FOX
- 45. FOX Life
- 46. FOX Crime
- 47. FOX Movies
- 48. National Geographic
- 49. Nat Geo Wild
- 50. 24 Kitchen
- 51. Sky News International
- 52. HBO HD
- 53. HBO 2 HD
- 54. HBO 3 HD
- 55. Cinemax HD
- 56. Cinemax 2 HD
- 57. Arena Sport 1 BiH
- 58. Arena Sport 1
- 59. Arena Sport 1 HR
- 60. Arena Sport 2
- 61. Arena Sport 3
- 62. Arena Sport 4
- 63. Eurosport 1 HD
- 64. Eurosport 2 HD
- 65. HRT 1
- 66. HRT 2
- 67. HRT 3
- 68. TV SLO 1 HD
- 69. RTL Televizija
- 70. RTL 2 Hrvatska
- 71. RTL Kockica
- 72. KCN 1 Kopernikus
- 73. KCN 2 Music
- 74. KCN 3 Svet+
- 75. MTV Europe
- 76. VH1
- 77. Animal Planet HD
- 78. Discovery Channel HD
- 79. Discovery Science HD
- 80. Discovery TX HD
- 81. History Channel HD
- 82. Investigation Discovery HD
- 83. TLC
- 84. Travel Channel
- 85. M1 Film HD
- 86. M1 Gold HD
- 87. Nicktoons
- 88. Minimax
- 89. Nickeleodeon
- 90. Nick Jr.
- 91. English Club TV
- 92. TV 7
- 93. Pink Kids
- 94. Pink Action
- 95. Pink Thriller
- 96. Pink Crime & Mystery
- 97. Pink Comedy
- 98. Pink Family
- 99. Pink Film
- 100. Pink Horror
- 101. Pink Movies
- 102. Pink Romance
- 103. Pink Sci-Fi&Fantasy
- 104. Pink Premium
- 105. Pink Soap
- 106. Pink
- 107. Pink 2 HD
- 108. Pink Extra
- 109. Pink Fashion
- 110. Pink Koncert
- 111. Pink Folk 1
- 112. Pink Folk 1
- 113. Pink M
- 114. Pink Music
- 115. Pink Music 2
- 116. Pink Hits 2
- 117. Pink Hits
- 118. City Play
- 119. Pink Pedia
- 120. Pink Plus
- 121. Pink n Roll
- 122. Pink Reality
- 123. Pink World
- 124. Pink Zabava
- 125. Pink Classic
- 126. Pink Style
- 127. Pink Western
- 128. Bravo Music
- 129. ProSieben
- 130. SAT.1
- 131. France 24 English
- 132. France 24 Francias
- 133. France 24 Arabic
- 134. RTCG Sat
- 135. RTS Svet
- 136. RTS 1
- 137. RTS 2
- 138. Euronews
- 139. Arirang TV
- 140. DM SAT
- 141. Sandžak TV
- 142. RTV Novi Pazar
- 143. Islam Channel
- 144. Baby TV
- 145. Moja TV Info
- 146. Moja TV Sport - owned by BH Telecom
- 147. Arena Sport 1 BiH HD
- 148. Arena Sport 2 HD
- 149. Arena Sport 3 HD
- 150. Arena Sport 5 HD
- 151. Al Jazeera Balkans HD
- 152. BHT 1 HD
- 153. Hayat HD
- 154. "Das ist Sarajevo" - Camera
- 155. Bjelašnica - Camera
- 156. Dolac Malta (Sarajevo) - City Camera
- 157. Igman - Panoramic Camera
- 158. Jahorina - Panoramic Camera
- 159. Mojmilo (Sarajevo) - Panoramic Camera
- 160. Mostar - City Camera
- 161. Neum - Panoramic Camera
- 162. Stolac - Panoramic camera
- 163. Travnik - Panoramic camera
- 164. Visoko piramide - City Camera
- 165. Vlašić - Panoramic Camera
- 166. Cinema TV (* 1 BAM)
- 167. Elta 1 HD
- 168. Face TV HD
- 173. BH Radio 1
- 174. Federalni Radio
- 175. Antena Sarajevo
- 176. RSG Radio
- 177. Radio M
- 178. Radio Slon
- 179. Radio BIR
- 180. Radio Gračanica
- 181. Radio Bosanska Krupa
- 182. Radio USK
- 183. Radio Glas Drine
- 184. Radio Studio D
- 185. Radio Usora
- 186. Radio Lukavac
- 187. Novi Radio Bihać
- 188. Radio Kalman
- 189. Radio Kameleon
- 190. Radio Bihać
- 191. TNT Radio Travnik
- 192. Radio Vogošća
- 193. Radio Tuzla (ex. Radio 7)
- 194. Radio Cazin
- 195. Radio Marija BiH
- 196. Radio Prača
- 197. Radio Visoko
- 198. Narodni Radio
- 199. Radio Goražde
- 200. Radio TK
- 201. Radio BA
- 202. Radio Antena Jelah
- 203. RTL Living
- 204. Saudi Quran
- 205. CCTV 4
- 206. CGTN Documentary
- 207. CGTN
- 208. Radio Bet
- 209. CITY TV
- 210. Bihać - City Camera
- 211. TV Glas Drine
- 216. Pink Fight Network
- 217. Pink Kuvar
- 218. Pink Show
- 219. Pink Serije
- 220. Pink World Cinema
- 221. Pink Super Kids
- 222. Radio Republike Srpske
- 223. Radio Feral Kalesija
- 224. Hayatovci
- 225. BN Music
- 226. Kakanj - Panoramic Camera
- 227. Mostar - Panoramic Camera
- 228. Slow Radio
- 229. Sky Radio 90
- 230. Sky Radio Lovesongs
- 231. Sky Radio 00s Hits
- 232. Sky Radio Lounge
- 233. IP Music Radio
- 234. IP Music Slow Radio
- 235. RTV Bugojno
- 236. Mosaic 1 (Moja TV Camera overview)
- 237. Televizija 5
- 238. Trebević (Sarajevo) - Panoramic Camera
- 239. MTV Igman HD
- 240. Radio Kakanj
- 241. Radio Bugojno
- 242. Konjic - City Camera
- 243. Goražde - Camera
- 244. Radio Konjic
- 245. RTV Sana
- 246. Radio Mix
- 247. City TV HD
- 248. RTL.de
- 249. Sarajevo, Trg BiH - City Camera
- 250. Radio Zenica
- 251. Radio Otvorena Mreža
- 252. Radio Sarajevo 90,2
- 253. Konjic 2 - City Camera
- 254. Tuzla - Panoramic Camera
- 255. Tatabrada TV
- 256. Sevdah TV
- 257. Radio Donji Vakuf
- 258. Pink HA HA
- 259. Pink LOL
- 260. Panonska jezera, Tuzla - City Camera
- 261. Smetovi, Zenica - Panoramic Camera
- 262. Radio Zenit
- 263. TVSA HD
- 264. Kanal 6 HD
- 265. Al Jazeera Arabic
- 266. Solar Radio
- 267. LoungeFM
- 268. FM4 Radio
- 269. Jablanica - Panoramic Camera
- 270. Mosaic 2 (Moja TV Camera overview)
- 271. Zenica - City Camera
- 272. Bjelašnica 2 - Panoramic Camera
- 273. Gračanica - City Camera
- 274. Goražde 2 - Panoramic Camera
- 275. Sarajevo, Skenderija - City Camera
- 276. Cazin - City Camera
- 277. MTV Hits
- 278. MTV Rocks
- 279. VH 1 Classic
- 280. Banja Luka - Panoramic Camera
- 281. RTRS Plus
- 282. Radio Gradačac
- 283. Radio Mir
- 284. Club MTV
- 285. Moja TV Sport 2 - owned by BH Telecom
- 286. Hayatovci HD
- 287. Televizija 5 HD
- 288. RtV Vogošća HD
- 289. Fojnica - Panoramic Camera
- 290. TV 7 HD
- 291. M1 Family
- 292. Hayat Folk HD
- 293. Hayat Music HD
- 294. Hayat Plus HD
- 295. Maglaj - Panoramic Camera
- 296. Hi On Line Radio Jazz
- 297. Hit Radio Namur
- 298. Sky Radio 10s Hits
- 299. Blagaj - City Camera
- 300. TRT World
- 301. TRT World HD
- 302. Moj radio - owned by BH Telecom
- 303. Ravna Planina - Panoramic Camera
- 304. Trebević Cable Car, Sarajevo - Panoramic Camera
- 305. RTV USK HD
- 306. Arirang TV HD
- 307. CGTN HD
- 308. CCTV 4 HD
- 309. CGTN Documentary HD
- 310. Bugojno - Panoramic Camera
- 311. Pink TimeOut
- 312. Tešanj - City Camera
- 313. Tropik TV
- 314. TV Glas Drine HD
- 315. B1 TV HD
- 316. Zavidovići - Panoramic Camera
- 317. RTV Dom, Sarajevo - City Camera
- 318. TRT Arabi
- 319. TRT Arabi HD
- 320. Jajce - Panoramic Camera
- 321. RadiYo Active Zenica
- 322. OTV Valentino
- 323. Una river canyon, Bihać - Panoramic Camera
- 324. Radio Valentino
- 325. TV Podrinje
- 326. Moj Film - owned by BH Telecom
- 327. Lov i Ribolov
- 328. Pikaboo
- 329. Vavoom
- 330. Grand TV
- 331. N1 Bosna i Hercegovina
- 332. Sport Klub 1
- 333. Sport Klub 2
- 334. Sport Klub 3
- 335. Sport Klub 4
- 336. Sport Klub 5
- 337. Sport Klub 6
- 338. Sport Klub 7
- 339. Sport Klub 8
- 340. Sport Klub 9
- 341. Sport Klub 10
- 342. Sport Klub Golf
- 343. Sport Klub eSports
- 344. Hema TV
- 345. NTV IC Kakanj HD
- 346. RTV Slon HD
- 347. RTV Cazin HD
- 348. RTV Zenica HD
- 349. Trebinje - Panoramic Camera
- 350. Gradačac - City Camera
- 351. Neon TV HD
- 353. Super Media TV
- 354. Nickeleodeon HD
- 355. Bihać - Panoramic Camera
- 356. Eternal flame, Sarajevo - City Camera
- 357. Ferhadija, Sarajevo - City Camera

== See also ==
- BH Telecom
- List of cable television companies in BiH
- List of radio stations in Bosnia and Herzegovina
- Television in Bosnia and Herzegovina
