= Telemach (Bosnia and Herzegovina) =

Cable TV operator and ISP

Telemach BH d.o.o.
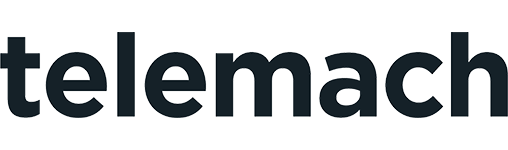
- Native name: Telemach d.o.o.
- Type: Private
- Industry: Telecommunication Cable broadband Cable television Pay television
- Predecessor: BH Cabel Net; Global Net; Elob; ASK Ilidža; Monet; Telekabel; Vinet; Artnet; Velnet; VKT-NET; HS; HKB-Net; M&H Company; Global Net Travnik; BHB CABLE TV Trion Tel
- Founded: 2005; 21 years ago in Sarajevo, Bosnia and Herzegovina
- Headquarters: Sarajevo, Bosnia and Herzegovina
- Area served: Bosnia and Herzegovina, Montenegro
- Key people: Admir Drinić (CEO)
- Products: Cable television Pay television Broadband Internet; Fixed telephony
- Parent: United Group
- Website: www.telemach.ba

Telemach (full legal name: Telemach d.o.o.) is cable television and broadband internet service provider and alternative fixed line operator in Bosnia and Herzegovina. The company is part of the United Group, owned by the British BC Partners. It was founded as M&H Company in Sarajevo in 2005 and was one of the three companies merged to form United Group in 2007.

== Market ==
Telemach services are available in the following Bosnian cities:

- Sarajevo (since 2010)
- Mostar (since 2011)
- Zenica, Breza (since 2012)
- Kakanj, Travnik, Vitez, Visoko (since 2013)
- Bugojno (since 2015; ex VKT-net)
- Tuzla, Lukavac, Kladanj, Gračanica, Brčko, Doboj Istok, Novi Travnik, Jajce, Mrkonjić Grad, Sanski Most and Velika Kladuša (since 2017; ex BHB CABLE TV)
- Novi Travnik - (since 2016; ex Global Internet d.o.o.)
- Ilidža - (since 2016; ex ASK CATV)
- Banja Luka - (since 2020 in partnership with Trion Tel)

== Services ==
=== Cable television ===
Telemach currently (May 2022) offers between 35-51 TV channels via cable television in six major areas (Sarajevo 35, Mostar 35, Zenica, Kakanj i Visoko area, Central Bosnia Canton and ex. BHB CABLE TV markets).

=== Digital television ===
Telemach offers several digital packages (EON), and there is also 32 radio stations and 48 Music Choice channels. The digital offer is unique for all areas in Bosnia and Herzegovina.

EON Start

- 1 - N1 BiH HD
- 2 - BHT 1 HD
- 3 - RTRS
- 4 - Nova BH HD
- 5 - Hayat TV HD
- 6 - O Kanal HD
- 7 - Face TV HD
- 8 - Al Jazeera Balkans HD
- 9 - TVSA HD
- 10 - TV Alfa
- 11 - OBN HD
- 12 - BN HD
- 13 - Pink BH
- 14 - RTV Herceg-Bosne HD
- 15 - N1 HR HD
- 16 - Nova TV HR HD
- 17 - HRT 1 HD
- 18 - HRT 2 HD
- 19 - HRT 3 HD
- 20 - HRT 4 HD
- 21 - RTL HR HD
- 22 - RTL 2 HR HD
- 23 - Z1
- 24 - N1 SRB HD
- 25 - Nova S HD
- 26 - Prva TV HD
- 27 - Prva Plus HD
- 28 - Prva World HD
- 29 - Prva Kick HD
- 30 - B92
- 31 - Brainz HD
- 32 - Insajder TV HD
- 33 - FTV
- 34 - BHT 1 SD
- 35 - Hayat Plus
- 36 - O Kanal Plus HD
- 37 - HEMA TV
- 38 - RTV Vogošća HD
- 39 - RTV Visoko HD
- 40 - NTV IC Kakanj
- 41 - RTV Zenica HD
- 42 - Kanal 6
- 43 - TV Bugojno
- 44 - Prva BH HD
- 45 - RTV 7 Tuzla
- 46 - TV Lukavac
- 47 - TV TK
- 48 - HIT TV
- 49 - Izvorna TV
- 50 - OTV Valentino
- 51 - RTV Sana
- 52 - City TV HD
- 53 - TV Jablanica
- 54 - Posavina TV
- 55 - RTRS PLUS
- 56 - ATV Banja Luka
- 57 - RTV IS
- 58 - BIR TV HD
- 59 - MTV Igman HD
- 60 - Televizija 5 HD
- 61 - Laudato TV
- 62 - RTV Slo 1 HD
- 63 - RTCG Sat HD
- 64 - TV Vijesti
- 65 - Nova BG HD
- 66 - FOX HD
- 67 - Fox Life HD
- 68 - Fox Crime HD
- 69 - Fox Movie HD
- 70 - Epic Drama HD
- 71 - AXN Adria
- 72 - DIVA
- 73 - Pickbox TV HD
- 74 - AMC HD
- 75 - TV1000
- 76 - Kino TV HD
- 77 - Cinema TV
- 78 - Cinestar TV 1 HD
- 79 - Cinestar TV 2 HD
- 80 - Cinestar Fantasy HD
- 81 - Cinestar Action & Thriller HD
- 82 - Cinestar Comedy & Family HD
- 83 - Nova Sport HD
- 84 - SK 1 HD
- 85 - SK 2 HD
- 86 - SK 3 HD
- 87 - SK 4 HD
- 88 - SK 5 HD
- 89 - SK 6
- 90 - SK 7
- 91 - SK 8
- 92 - SK 9
- 93 - SK 10
- 94 - SK 1 HR
- 95 - SK 4K
- 96 - SK HD
- 97 - SK Golf HD
- 98 - SK Fight
- 99 - SK Esports HD
- 100 - Eurosport 1 HD
- 101 - Eurosport 2 HD
- 102 - Eurosport 4K
- 103 - Pikaboo HD
- 104 - Minimax
- 105 - RTL Kockica HD
- 106 - Nickelodeon
- 107 - Vavoom HD
- 108 - Cartoon Network
- 109 - Disney Channel
- 110 - Da Vinci HD
- 111 - Nick jr.
- 112 - nicktoons
- 113 - Disney Junior
- 114 - IDJ Kids HD
- 115 - BabyTV
- 116 - Hayatovci
- 117 - National Geographic HD
- 118 - Discovery Channel HD
- 119 - DokuTV HD
- 120 - History HD
- 121 - Viasat History HD
- 122 - Lov i Ribolov
- 123 - Viasat Explore HD
- 124 - Animal Planet HD
- 125 - Viasat Nature HD
- 126 - 24Kitchen HD
- 127 - HGTV HD
- 128 - Travel Channel HD
- 129 - TLC Balkans HD
- 130 - Fashion TV HD
- 131 - Grand TV HD
- 132 - Grand TV 2 HD
- 133 - IDJ TV HD
- 134 - Sevdah TV HD
- 135 - BN Music HD
- 136 - Hayat Folk
- 137 - Hayat Music
- 138 - O Kanal Music HD
- 139 - CMC HD
- 140 - Pink Music
- 141 - DM SAT
- 142 - K::CN 2
- 143 - MTV Europe
- 144 - Trace Urban HD
- 145 - MTV 00s
- 146 - CNN International
- 147 - BBC World News
- 148 - UA|TV
- 149 - 1+1 International
- 150 - Bloomberg TV
- 151 - RTL DE
- 152 - ProSieben
- 153 - VOX
- 154 - TRT Avaz
- 155 - Rai 1
- 156 - TV5 Monde
- 157 – Telemach Info Channel HD

EON Basic (EON Start package + additional channels)

- 1 - RTL Living HR HD
- 2 - K::CN 1
- 3 - Sci Fi HD
- 4 - Pink Western
- 5 - Pink Action
- 6 - AXN Spin
- 7 - Motorvision HD
- 8 - Boomerang
- 9 - JimJam
- 10 - National Geographic Wild HD
- 11 - Crime & Investigation Network
- 12 - ID HD
- 13 - E!
- 14 - K::CN 3
- 15 - Balkanika TV
- 16 - Euronews HD
- 17 - DW TV HD
- 18 - RTL Zwei
- 19 - ntv
- 20 - Dorcel TV HD

EON Extended package (EON Start, EON Basic + additional channels)

- 1 - ShortsTV HD
- 2 - Extreme Sports
- 3 - Nickelodeon HD
- 4 - Pink Kids
- 5 - History 2 HD
- 6 - BBC Earth HD
- 7 - Planet Earth HD
- 8 - Trace Sport Stars HD
- 9 - Pink Plus
- 10 - Pink Extra
- 11 - nickmusic
- 12 - MTV 80s
- 13 - MTV 90s
- 14 - MTV Hits
- 15 - club MTV
- 16 - MTV Live HD
- 17 - Stingray iConcerts HD
- 18 - Mezzo Live HD
- 19 - Private TV
- 20 - Dorcel XXX HD
- 21 - Dusk TV
- 22 - Hustler TV
- 23 - Hustler HD
- 24 - Playboy TV HD

Pink package (including pink channels from EON Start and EON Extended package)

- 1 - Pink Comedy
- 2 - Pink Romance
- 3 - Pink Premium HD
- 4 - Pink Movies
- 5 - Pink Film
- 6 - Pink Thriller
- 7 - Pink Crime & Mystery
- 8 - Pink Soap
- 9 - Pink SciFi & Fantasy
- 10 - Pink Horor
- 11 - Pink World Cinema
- 12 - Pink Classic
- 13 - Pink Serije
- 14 - Pink Family
- 15 - Pink Zabava
- 16 - Pink Reality
- 17 - Pink World
- 18 - Pink Show
- 19 - Pink Style
- 20 - Pink Fashion
- 21 - Pink Kuvar
- 22 - Pink Ha Ha
- 23 - Pink LOL
- 24 - Pink Pedia
- 25 - Pink Super Kids
- 26 - Bravo Music
- 27 - Pink Folk 1
- 28 - Pink Folk 2
- 29 - Pink Music 2
- 30 - Pink Hits
- 31 - Pink Hits 2
- 32 - Pink n Roll
- 33 - Pink Koncert
- 34 - City Play

HBO Premium package

- 1 - HBO HD
- 2 - HBO 2 HD
- 3 - HBO 3 HD
- 4 - Cinemax HD
- 5 - Cinemax 2 HD

Cinestar Premiere HD package

- 1 - Cinestar Premiere 1 HD
- 2 - Cinestar Premiere 2 HD

Zadruga Paket

- 1 – Zadruga Live 1
- 2 – Zadruga Live 2
- 3 – Zadruga Live 3
- 4 – Zadruga Live 4

Radio stations

- 1 - BH Radio 1
- 2 - Federalni Radio
- 3 - Radio Republike Srpske
- 4 - Antena Sarajevo
- 5 - Radio Sarajevo
- 6 - Radio Stari Grad
- 7 - Radio M
- 8 - Radio 8
- 9 - Kiss FM
- 10 - Radio Otvorena Mreža
- 11 - Radio Zenica
- 12 - Radio Zenit
- 13 - Radio Dobre Vibracije
- 14 - Običan Radio
- 15 - Nes Radio
- 16 - HR 1
- 17 - HR 2
- 18 - Radio Prvi
- 19 - Antena Zagreb
- 20 - Radio Dalmacija
- 21 - Otvoreni radio
- 22 - Play
- 23 - S2
- 24 - Radio Studio B
- 25 - Naxi
- 26 - Radio MIX
- 27 - Radio Kalman
- 28 - Radio Ask
- 29 - Radio Breza
- 30 - Narodni Radio
- 31 - BIR Radio
- 32 - Radiopostaja Mir Međugorje
- 33 - Radio Marija

Stingray Music

- 1 - Total Hits - Balkan
- 2 - Balkan Retro Hits
- 3 - Balkan Music / Gypsy
- 4 - '60s
- 5 - Soho '70s
- 6 - '80s
- 7 - '90s
- 8 - 2000s
- 9 - Revival 60s - 70s
- 10 - Rewind 80s - 90s
- 11 - Rock and Roll
- 12 - All Day Party
- 13 - Drive
- 14 - Freedom
- 15 - Silk (Love Songs)
- 16 - Total Hits UK
- 17 - Bass, Breaks and Beats
- 18 - Chillout
- 19 - Classic R'n'B & Soul
- 20 - Dancefloor Fillers
- 21 - Groove (Disco and Funk)
- 22 - Hip Hop
- 23 - Rock of Ages
- 24 - Headbangers
- 25 - Rock Anthems
- 26 - Alternative
- 27 - Hip-Hop/R&B UK
- 28 - Cool Jazz
- 29 - Jazz Classics
- 30 - The Spa
- 31 - Jammin'
- 32 - Cocktail Lounge
- 33 - Deep Blues
- 34 - Classical Calm
- 35 - Classical Greats
- 36 - La Vita è Bella
- 37 - Specials
- 38 - Chansons
- 39 - Country
- 40 - Greek Music
- 41 - Türk Müzigi
- 42 - World Carnival
