= BH Veza =

- Type: Public syndicated network
- Country: Bosnia and Herzegovina
- First air date: 2016
- Founded: 2016.
- Headquarters: Tuzla
- Broadcast area: Federation od BiH; Bosnia and Herzegovina
- Callsigns: BH Veza
- Affiliates: TVSA Sarajevo; RTV TK Tuzla; RTV ZE Zenica; RTV USK Bihać; City TV Mostar
- Former affiliations: RTV Goražde Goražde
- Official website: www.rtvusk.ba www.tvsa.ba

BH Veza is a Bosnian television network founded in 2016.

With a syndicated broadcasting programme under the BH Veza label, cantonal public TV stations have managed to cover a significant part of the territory of Federation of Bosnia and Herzegovina.

Broadcasters and the founders of the joint program BH Veza are five public television stations in the major Bosnian cities:

- TVSA from Sarajevo
- RTV TK from Tuzla
- RTV ZE from Zenica
- RTV USK from Bihać
- RTV Goražde from Goražde
- City TV from Mostar*

BH Veza broadcast programs that are jointly purchased, produced or co-produced by all member TV stations. The news program and a variety TV shows broadcast simultaneously on all six TV stations. On weekends, television stations jointly produce a morning or afternoon program for the network.

Public Broadcasting Service of the Federation of Bosnia and Herzegovina entity, RTV FBiH is not part of this project.

== See also ==
- Mreža TV
- Program Plus
- Television in Bosnia and Herzegovina
