= Miss.Net =

Cable television and Internet provider

- Native name: Miss.Net d.o.o. Bihać
- Company type: LLC (Private)
- Industry: Telecommunication; Cable broadband Cable television Pay television
- Headquarters: Bosanskih kraljeva bb,, Bihać, Bosnia and Herzegovina
- Areas served: Una-Sana Canton
- Products: Cable television Pay television Broadband Internet; Fixed telephony
- Website: www.missnet.ba

Miss.Net d.o.o. Bihać is one of the leading cable television and broadband Internet service providers in Una-Sana Canton, Bosnia and Herzegovina. The company was founded in 2004 and its headquarters is located in Bihać.

== Cable TV channel line-up ==
Miss.Net Company currently (February 2016) offers 61 TV channel via cable television in Bihać.

- 1 - Arena Sport 1 BiH
- 2 - Hayat Plus
- 3 - RTL Televizija
- 4 - Pink Reality
- 5 - TLC Balkans
- 6 - MTV Srbija
- 7 - BHT 1
- 8 - FTV
- 9 - Pink BH
- 10 - Test
- 11 - Hayat TV
- 12 - Televizija USK
- 13 - OBN
- 14 - Nova TV
- 15 - Pink BH
- 16 - Cartoon Network
- 17 - HRT 1 RTS Sat
- 18 - Eurosport 1
- 19 - HRT 2
- 20 - Discovery Channel Europe
- 21 - Animal Planet
- 22 - Pink Premium
- 23 - National Geographic Channel
- 24 - Arena Sport 4
- 25 - Viasat Explorer
- 26 - Arena Sport 3
- 27 - Pink Action
- 28 - Nat Geo Wild
- 29 - BN Televizija
- 30 - Pink Movies
- 31 - CNN
- 32 - ID X
- 33 - RTV Cazin
- 34 - DM Sat
- 35 - History Channel
- 36 - Balkanika TV
- 37 - Eurosport 2
- 38 - O Kanal
- 39 - RTL 2 HR
- 40 - TV Alfa
- 41 - RTCG
- 42 - B92 Info
- 43 - Pink Kids
- 44 - OTV Valentino
- 45 - Hayat Folk
- 46 - VH1
- 47 - Pink Soap
- 48 - Al Jazeera Balkans
- 49 - Hayat Music
- 50 - Face TV
- 51 - Super RTL
- 52 - RTS Sat
- 53 - Pro 7
- 54 - Sat 1
- 55 - RTRS
- 56 - RTL
- 57 - RTL 2
- 58 - Radio Bir
- 59 - Universal Channel
- 60 - HRT 3
- 61 - Test / Service channel
