= Radio Vogošća =

Bosnian public radio station

Vogošća; Bosnia and Herzegovina
- Broadcast area: Sarajevo Canton
- Frequency: Vogošća 88.2 MHz
- Branding: Public

Programming
- Language: Bosnian language
- Format: Local news, talk and music

Ownership
- Owner: J.P. RTV VOGOŠĆA d.o.o. Vogošća
- Sister stations: TV Vogošća

History
- Founded: 13 March 1996
- First air date: July 18, 1996
- Call sign meaning: VOGOSCA

Technical information
- Transmitter coordinates: 43°54′N 18°21′E
- Repeater: Sarajevo/Grdonj

Links
- Webcast: Live Stream
- Website: rtvvogosca.ba

Radio Vogošća is a Bosnian local public radio station, broadcasting from Vogošća, Bosnia and Herzegovina.

The parent company, JP Radio Televizija Vogošća, was founded on 13 March 1996. Regular broadcasting of the radio program began on 18 July 1996. The station broadcasts a variety of programs including local news, talk shows, and various music genres. The programs are mainly produced in the Bosnian language. The station's signal covers Sarajevo and the Sarajevo Canton region.

The estimated number of potential listeners is around 386,197. The radio station is also available via the Bosnian IPTV platform Moja TV (channel 189) and via online streaming.

== Programming ==
Radio Vogošća features a diverse daily schedule:

- Ritam jutra (Morning Rhythm) – Morning show airing daily from 07:00 to 10:00, featuring news, music, and service information.
- Mozaik (Mosaic) – A magazine show covering politics, culture, and sports, airing weekdays from 11:00 to 14:00.
- Radio Riznica (Radio Treasury) – Folk and traditional music program, airing weekdays from 14:05 to 18:00.
- Tema dana (Topic of the Day) – An interactive talk show discussing current events, airing weekdays at 17:00.
- Vogošćanska hronika (Vogošća Chronicle) – The central news program, airing daily at 19:00 and 23:00.
- Večernji program (Evening Program) – Nighttime entertainment with music wishes and light topics, from 20:30 to 23:00.
- Vikend program (Weekend Program) – Specialized weekend content including sports updates and music news.

== Frequencies ==
The station currently broadcasts on one main FM frequency:

- Vogošća / Sarajevo – 88.2 MHz

== See also ==
- List of radio stations in Bosnia and Herzegovina
- RTV Vogošća
