= Tb1 =

Bosnian cable television channel

- Country: Bosnia and Herzegovina
- Broadcast area: Bosnia and Herzegovina
- Headquarters: Trebinje, Dobrovoljačka br. 18

Programming
- Language(s): Serbian
- Picture format: 4:3 576i SDTV

Ownership
- Owner: Callidus d.o.o. Trebinje
- Key people: Adrijana Jeremić

History
- Former names: Tß1

tb1 (Serbian: Tß1) is a Bosnian commercial television channel based in Trebinje, Bosnia and Herzegovina. The program is mainly produced in Serbian. The television station was established in 2016.

== See also ==
- O Kanal
- TV ONE HD
