= Radio Cazin =

Bosnian radio station

- Cazin; Bosnia and Herzegovina
- Broadcast area: Una-Sana Canton
- Frequencies: Cazin 89.9 MHz; Cazin 98.8 MHz
- Branding: Public

Programming
- Language: Bosnian language
- Format: Local news, talk and music

Ownership
- Owner: Javno preduzeće radio-televizija d.o.o. Cazin
- Sister stations: RTV Cazin (Television)

History
- First air date: September 2, 1975
- Call sign meaning: R CAZIN

Technical information
- Transmitter coordinates: 44°58′N 15°56′E
- Repeaters: Cazin/Hajrulahovića Brdo; Cazin/Skokovi-Muratovo brdo

Links
- Webcast: On website
- Website: www.rtvcazin.ba

Radio Cazin is a Bosnian local public radio station, broadcasting from Cazin, Bosnia and Herzegovina.

Radio Cazin was launched on 2 September 1975 by the municipal council of Cazin. In Yugoslavia and in SR Bosnia and Herzegovina, it was part of local/municipal Radio Sarajevo network affiliate. This radio station broadcasts a variety of programs such as music, sport, local news and talk shows. The programs are mainly produced in Bosnian language.

The estimated number of potential listeners of Radio Cazin is around 57,793.

Due to the favorable geographical position in Bosanska Krajina area, this radio station is also available in municipalities: Bihać, Bužim, Bosanska Krupa, Velika Kladuša, Prijedor and in a part of the Lika-Senj County in neighboring Croatia. Radio Cazin is also available via IPTV platform Moja TV on channel 191.

RTV C, a television service, was established in 1993 and is also part of public municipality services.

== Frequencies ==
The radio station currently broadcasts on two frequencies:

- Cazin 89.9 MHz;
- Cazin 98.8 MHz.

== See also ==
- List of radio stations in Bosnia and Herzegovina
