= Kablovska televizija KG-1 =

Bosnian cable television channel

- Country: Bosnia and Herzegovina
- Broadcast area: Bosnian Podrinje
- Headquarters: Goražde

Programming
- Language(s): Bosnian language
- Picture format: 4:3 576i (SDTV)

Ownership
- Owner: "KG-1" d.o.o. Goražde
- Key people: Dževad Čengić

Links
- Website: www.kg1.ba

Kablovska televizija KG-1 or KG 1 is a Bosnian local commercial Cable television channel based in Goražde, Bosnia and Herzegovina. The program is mainly produced in Bosnian language.
