= Naša TV (Bosnia and Herzegovina) =

Local commercial cable channel

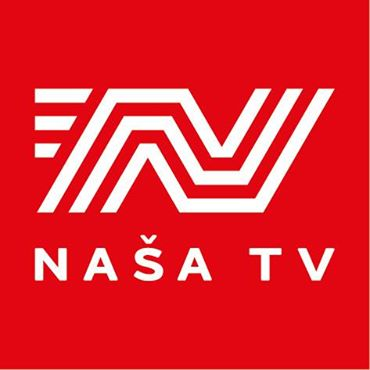
- Country: Bosnia and Herzegovina
- Broadcast area: Bosnia and Herzegovina
- Headquarters: Mostar

Programming
- Language: Croatian
- Picture format: 16:9 576i SDTV

Ownership
- Owner: "Naša TV" d.o.o. Mostar
- Key people: Ivan Cigić

History
- Launched: March 2016
- Closed: 1 July 2019

Naša TV was a Herzegovinian/Bosnian local commercial cable television channel based in Mostar, Bosnia and Herzegovina. Television channel is launched in March 2016 and it produces in Croatian. "Naša TV" literally means "Our TV", in Croatian.

Naša TV is available via cable systems throughout the Bosnia and Herzegovina and target audience is in Herzegovina-Neretva Canton, West Herzegovina and Canton 10, Central Bosnia and Posavina Canton and part of Sarajevo Canton.
