= Druga TV =

druga.tv
- Country: Bosnia and Herzegovina
- Headquarters: Tuzla

Programming
- Language: Bosnian language
- Picture format: 4:3 576i (SDTV)

Ownership
- Owner: Arthur d.o.o. Tuzla
- Key people: Elmir Huremović

History
- Launched: 2012

Links
- Website: www.druga.tv

Availability

Streaming media
- Online player: Available at website

Druga.tv is a Bosnian commercial cable/television channel based in Tuzla, Bosnia and Herzegovina.
