= PRVI.TV =

- Country: Bosnia and Herzegovina
- Headquarters: Mostar

Programming
- Language(s): Croatian
- Picture format: 4:3 576i SDTV

Ownership
- Owner: PRVI.TV d.o.o.
- Key people: Marko Karačić

History
- Launched: 2014

Links
- Website: prvi.tv

PRVI.TV is a Croatian-language television channel based in Mostar, Bosnia and Herzegovina. The program is mainly produced in Croatian. The TV station was established in 2014. The Croatian word prvi means 'first'.
