= WTV Gračanica =

Bosnian cable television channel

WTV (Gračanica)
- Country: Bosnia and Herzegovina
- Broadcast area: Tuzla Canton
- Headquarters: Gračanica

Programming
- Language(s): Bosnian language

Ownership
- Owner: WIRAC.NET d.o.o. za promet i usluge u telekomunikacijama

History
- Launched: 2016

Links
- Website: www.wtv.ba

WTV is a Bosnian local commercial Cable television channel based in Gračanica, Bosnia and Herzegovina. The program is mainly produced in Bosnian language and it is available in Tuzla Canton.
