= RTV Slobomir =

Televizija Slobomir
- Country: Bosnia and Herzegovina
- Headquarters: Slobomir

Programming
- Language(s): Serbian
- Picture format: 4:3 576i SDTV

Ownership
- Owner: "RADIO TELEVIZIJA SLOBOMIR" d.o.o. Slobomir
- Key people: Slobodan Pavlović; Sandra Nikolić

Links
- Website: www.rtvslobomir.com

Availability

Terrestrial
- Bijeljina area: 44 UHF

Slobomir Televizija was a Bosnian commercial television channel based in Slobomir (near city of Bijeljina), Bosnia and Herzegovina which broadcast from 2005 to 2023. The program was mainly produced in Serbian. The local radio station Radio Slobomir was also part of this company.

In 2022, the television channel was put up for sale for 18,7 mln KM.
