= Info Plus =

Serbian cable television station

- Country: Bosnia and Herzegovina
- Broadcast area: Bosanska Posavina
- Headquarters: Gradiška

Programming
- Language(s): Serbian

Ownership
- Owner: Info Plus d.o.o. Gradiška
- Key people: Miodrag Jokić

History
- Launched: 2004

Links
- Website: www.gradiska.tv

Info Plus or Info+ is a Bosnian local commercial Cable television channel based in Gradiška, Bosnia and Herzegovina. The program is mainly produced in Serbian and it is available in Bosanska Posavina area.
