= TV KISS (Bosnia and Herzegovina) =

TV Kiss
- Country: Bosnia and Herzegovina
- Headquarters: Kiseljak

Programming
- Language(s): Croatian
- Picture format: 4:3 576i (SDTV)

Ownership
- Owner: Hrvatska radiotelevizija Kiseljak d.o.o. za proizvodnju i emitiranje radio-televizijskog programa Kiseljak

History
- Launched: 1992
- Closed: 1 July 2019

TV Kiss was a Bosnia and Herzegovina local commercial television channel based in Kiseljak, Bosnia and Herzegovina. The program is mainly produced in Croatian. The TV station was established in 1992 and become a part of Radiotelevizija Herceg-Bosne in 2019.
