= Vikom Music =

- Country: Bosnia and Herzegovina
- Headquarters: Gradiška

Programming
- Language(s): Serbian
- Picture format: 4:3 576i SDTV

Ownership
- Owner: RTV "VIKOM" d.o.o. Gradiška
- Key people: Vinko Perić
- Sister channels: RTV Vikom

History
- Launched: 2013

Links
- Website: www.vikom.tv

Vikom Music is a Bosnian commercial music cable television channel based in Gradiška, Bosnia and Herzegovina. The program is mainly produced in Serbian. The TV station was established in 2013.
