= Vinet =

Vinet is a surname, and may refer to:

- Alexandre Vinet (1797–1847), Swiss critic and theologian
- Élie Vinet (1509–1587), French Renaissance humanist, classical scholar, translator and antiquary
- Luc Vinet (born 1953), Canadian physicist and former rector of the Université de Montréal

== See also ==
- Vinets
