= VIK Televizija =

- Country: Bosnia and Herzegovina
- Broadcast area: Vlasenica
- Headquarters: Vlasenica

Programming
- Language(s): Serbian language
- Picture format: 4:3 576i SDTV

History
- Launched: 2005 (television)
- Closed: 12 February 2013

VIK Televizija or Vlasenički informativni kanal was a local Bosnian public cable television channel based in Vlasenica municipality. It was founded in 2005 and it was closed in 2013. The station was closed by order of Mayor Dragoslav Todorović and its premises were sealed.
