= Inicijativa TV =

Bosnian cable television channel

- Country: Bosnia and Herzegovina
- Broadcast area: Bosnia and Herzegovina
- Headquarters: Ludviga Kube br. 7, Tuzla

Programming
- Language(s): Bosnian language
- Picture format: 16:9 1080p HDTV

Ownership
- Owner: UDRUŽENJE CENTRI CIVILNIH INICIJATIVA

History
- Launched: 2012

Links
- Website: www.inicijativa.tv

Inicijativa TV is Bosnian online television channel based in city of Tuzla. It was established in 2012 by Centers of Civic initiatives. The programming is produced in the Croatian, Serbian and Bosnian language.
