= TV ONE HD =

Bosnian cable television channel

A one HD TV
- Country: Bosnia and Herzegovina
- Broadcast area: Bosnia and Herzegovina
- Headquarters: Maršala Tita br. 67; Kozarac, Prijedor

Programming
- Language(s): Bosnian language
- Picture format: 16:9 1080i (HDTV)

Ownership
- Owner: "M ENTERTAINMENT- 4K PRODUCTION" d.o.o. Kozarac, Prijedor
- Key people: Nihad Mehanović

History
- Launched: 20 June 2018

ТV ONE HD is a Bosnian local commercial Cable television channel based in Kozarac, Prijedor, Bosnia and Herzegovina. The program is mainly produced in HD in Bosnian language.

== See also ==
- ONE HD TV
