= RTV Doboj =

- Country: Bosnia and Herzegovina
- Broadcast area: Doboj
- Headquarters: Doboj

Programming
- Language(s): Serbian
- Picture format: 4:3 576i SDTV

Ownership
- Owner: J.P.Radio Televizija Doboj d.o.o.
- Sister channels: Radio Doboj

History
- Launched: 17 April 1967 as Radio Doboj

Links
- Website: www.rtvdoboj.com

RTV Doboj or РТВ Добој is a local Bosnian public cable television channel based in city of Doboj. Program is mainly produced in Serbian.

Radio Doboj is also part of public municipality services.
