= Herceg TV =

- Country: Bosnia and Herzegovina
- Headquarters: Trebinje

Programming
- Language: Serbian
- Picture format: 16:9 720p HDTV

Ownership
- Owner: "Herceg radio-televizija" d.o.o. Trebinje
- Key people: generalni direktor Đorđe Bjelaković

History
- Launched: 2008

Links
- Website: www.herceg.tv

Availability

Terrestrial
- Trebinje area: Digital signal
- Gacko area: 28 UHF

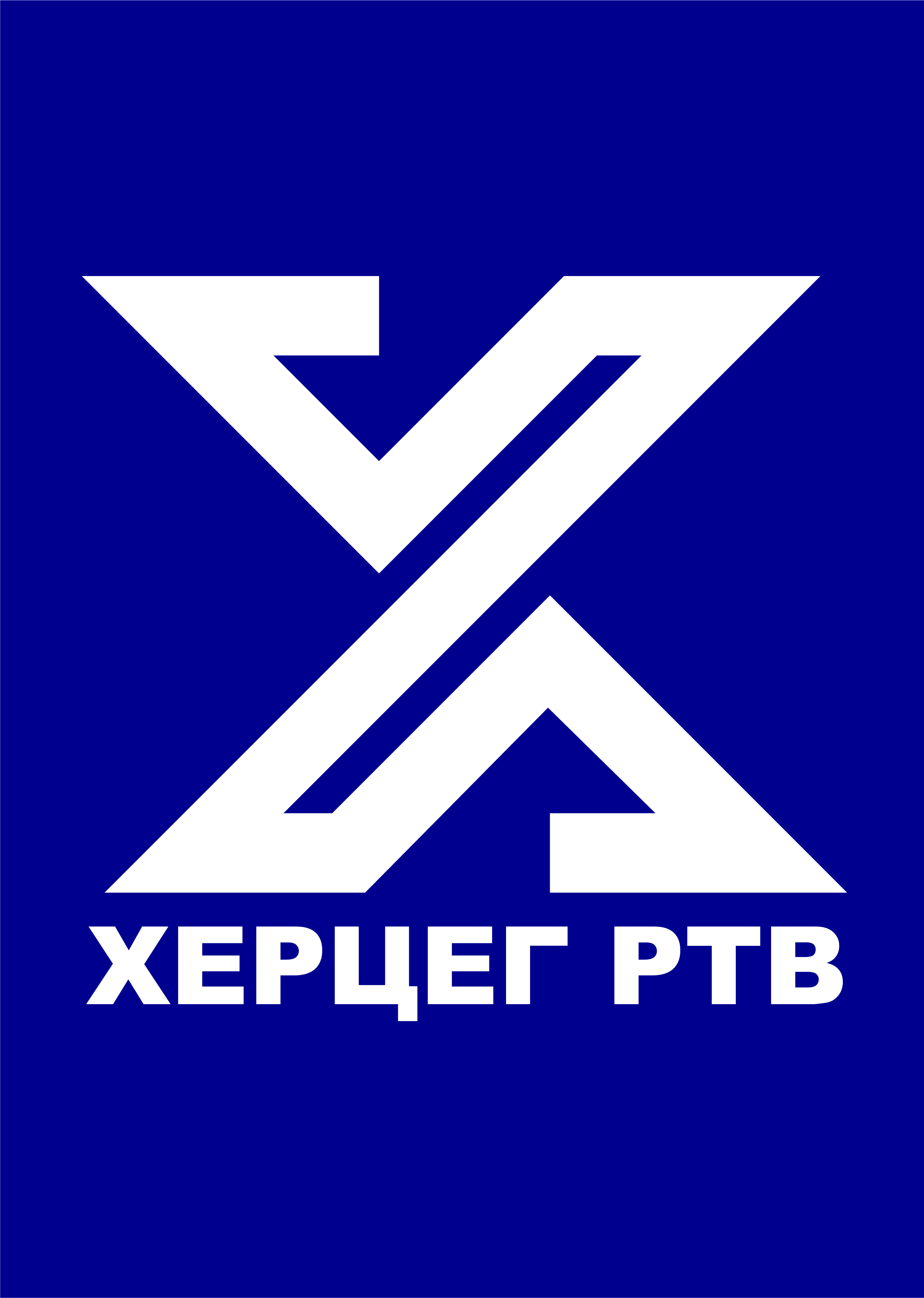

Herceg TV (Serbian Cyrillic: Херцег ТВ) is a Herzegovinan commercial television channel based in Trebinje, Bosnia and Herzegovina. The program is mainly produced in Serbian. The TV station was established in 2008.
