= TV Simić =

- Country: Bosnia and Herzegovina
- Broadcast area: Banja Luka
- Headquarters: Banja Luka; Kralja Petra I Karađorđevića br. 74

Programming
- Language: Serbian
- Picture format: 4:3 576i SDTV

Ownership
- Owner: "Foto Color Labor S" d.o.o. Banja Luka
- Key people: Vladimir Simić

History
- Launched: 1996
- Former names: ТВ С1

Links
- Website: www.tvsimic.com

Availability

Terrestrial
- Banja Luka: 25 UHF, 46 UHF

TV Simić or Serbian Cyrillic: ТВ Симић is a local commercial television channel based in Banja Luka, Bosnia and Herzegovina. The program is mainly produced in Serbian. TV station was established in 1996. TV Simić reports on local events in Banja Luka, Republika Srpska entity and BiH.
