= Cinema TV India =

Indian Hindi movie channel

- Country: India
- Headquarters: Noida, India

Ownership
- Owner: Cinema 24X7 Pvt Ltd (Naaptol Group)
- Sister channels: WOW Cinema One; Naaptol; Naaptol Malayalam; Naaptol Tamil; Naaptol Telugu; Naaptol Kannada; Naaptol Bangla

History
- Launched: 1 June 2012; 14 years ago
- Closed: 1 May 2024; 2 years ago
- Former names: Cinema TV; NT8

Links
- Website: Official Website

Cinema TV India is an Indian Hindi movies channel owned by Cinema 24X7 PVT LTD (which is the whole subsidiary owned by leading home shopping Network Naaptol Group). The channel was launched on 1 June 2012.

== History ==
The Cinema TV channel was launched on 1 June 2012 as a free-to-air movie channel. This channel will be relaunch in India on 15 September 2025.

== Former Shows ==
- Fillum Baazi
- Bollywood Times
- Bhakti Geet Mala
