= TV Rudo =

Bosnian television station

- Country: Bosnia and Herzegovina
- Broadcast area: Rudo
- Headquarters: Rudo

Programming
- Language(s): Serbian language
- Picture format: 16:9 HDTV 1080i HDTV

Ownership
- Owner: JP Informativni centar Rudo

History
- Launched: 28 June 1993 (television)

Links
- Website: www.tvrudo.com

Availability

Terrestrial
- Rudo: DVB-t2

TV Rudo or Televizija Rudo is a local Bosnian public television channel based in Rudo municipality. It was established on 28 June 1993 as part of public municipality services.
