= NTV Arena =

- Country: Bosnia and Herzegovina
- Headquarters: Bijeljina; Svetog Save br. 86

Programming
- Language: Serbian
- Picture format: 4:3 576i SDTV

Ownership
- Owner: "Astra Media" d.o.o. Bijeljina

History
- Launched: 1999
- Former names: Nezavisni TV – Studio "Arena"

Links
- Website: www.ntvarena.com

Availability

Terrestrial
- Yes: Bijeljina area

NTV Arena or Nezavisna televizija Arena ('Independent') is a local commercial television channel based in Bijeljina, Bosnia and Herzegovina. The program is mainly produced in Serbian. The TV station was established in 1999. NTV Arena reports on local events in Bijeljina, Republika Srpska entity and BiH.

The channel broadcasts TV series, entertainment and news. Channel is also part of local news network in the RS entity called PRIMA mreža (Serbian Cyrillic: ПРИМА мрежа).
