= TV Bel Kanal =

TV Bel
- Country: Bosnia and Herzegovina
- Headquarters: Banja Luka; Jovana Dučića 23a

Programming
- Language: Serbian
- Picture format: 4:3 576i SDTV

Ownership
- Owner: "BEL-KANAL" d.o.o. Banja Luka
- Key people: Dalibor Popović

History
- Launched: 2003

Links
- Website: www.belkanal.tv

Availability

Terrestrial
- Yes: Banja Luka area

TV Bel Kanal or Serbian Cyrillic: ТВ Бел Канал is a local commercial television channel based in Banja Luka, Bosnia and Herzegovina. The program is mainly produced in Serbian. TV station was established in 2003. TV Bel reports on local events in Banja Luka, Republika Srpska entity and BiH.

The channel broadcasts documentaries from domestic and foreign production, TV series, movies and entertainment. Channel is also part of local news network in the RS entity called PRIMA mreža (Serbian Cyrillic: ПРИМА мрежа).
