= Behar TV =

- Country: Bosnia and Herzegovina
- Headquarters: Sarajevo

Programming
- Language(s): Bosnian language
- Picture format: 4:3 576i (SDTV)

Ownership
- Owner: "TVX" d.o.o. za radio i televizijsku djelatnost, Sarajevo
- Key people: Midhat Paravlić

History
- Former names: TVX Sarajevo

Links
- Website: www.behartv.com

Availability

Terrestrial
- Terrestrial signal: Sarajevo 60 UHF

Behar TV is a Bosnian local commercial television channel based in Sarajevo, Bosnia and Herzegovina. The program is mainly produced in Bosnian language. Until 2009, television has operated under the name "TVX Sarajevo".
