= NTV Patria =

Bosnian cable television channel

- Country: Bosnia and Herzegovina
- Broadcast area: Doboj
- Headquarters: Doboj

Programming
- Language(s): Serbian

Ownership
- Owner: Nezavisna televizija ˝NTV Patria˝ Društvo sa ograničenom odgovornošću Doboj

History
- Former names: Nezavisna televizija Patria

NTV Patria or Nezavisna televizija Patria is a Bosnian local commercial Cable television channel based in Doboj, Bosnia and Herzegovina. The program is mainly produced in Serbian.
