= IN Televizija =

- Country: Bosnia and Herzegovina
- Broadcast area: Bijeljina
- Headquarters: Bijeljina

Programming
- Language(s): Serbian language

Ownership
- Owner: Telrad NET d.o.o.

History
- Launched: 2008
- Closed: 31.12.2020.

Links
- Website: www.intelevizija.com

IN Televizija or IN TV was a local commercial cable television channel based in Bijeljina, Bosnia and Herzegovina. The program is mainly produced in the Serbian language. TV station was established in 2008. IN Televizija broadcasts a variety of programs such as local news, sports, music and documentaries.
