= RTV IS =

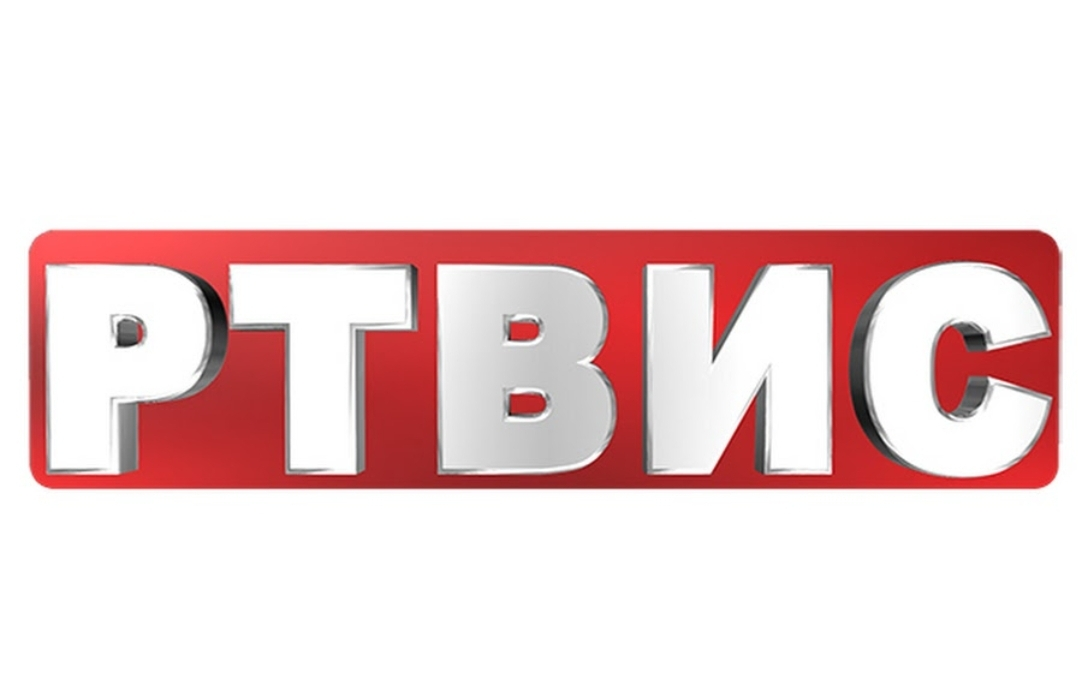
- Country: Bosnia and Herzegovina
- Broadcast area: Istočno Sarajevo
- Headquarters: Istočno Sarajevo

Programming
- Language(s): Serbian
- Picture format: 4:3 576i SDTV

Ownership
- Owner: Javno preduzeće za informativnu, kulturnu i zabavnu djelatnost "Radio i televizija Istočno Sarajevo" Istočno Sarajevo
- Key people: Branislav Ilić v.d. direktor

History
- Launched: 2008
- Former names: РТВ Источно Сарајево

Links
- Website: www.rtvis.tv

RTV IS or RTV Istočno Sarajevo is a local Bosnian public cable television channel based in Istočno Sarajevo, Bosnia and Herzegovina. The program is mainly produced in Serbian. TV station was established in 2008. Local radio station Radio Istočno Sarajevo is also part of this company. The channel broadcasts local news, TV series and entertainment. Channel is also part of local news network in the RS entity called PRIMA mreža (Serbian Cyrillic: ПРИМА мрежа).
