= Centralne Nacionalne Novosti =

CNN (Centralne nacionalne novosti)
- Country: Bosnia and Herzegovina
- Broadcast area: BiH
- Headquarters: Sarajevo

Programming
- Language(s): Bosnian language
- Picture format: 16:9 576i

Ownership
- Owner: "CNN" d.o.o. Sarajevo
- Key people: Senad Sinanagić

History
- Launched: 2012

Availability

Terrestrial
- DA: DA

CNN is a Bosnian commercial television channel based in Sarajevo, Bosnia and Herzegovina. The program is mainly produced in Bosnian language. The TV station was established in 2012.
