= M&H Company =

Telecoms company in Bosnia and Herzegovina

- Native name: M&H Company d.o.o.
- Company type: LLC (Private)
- Industry: Telecommunication Cable broadband Cable television Pay television
- Predecessor: HS Kablovska televizija; HKBnet
- Headquarters: Terezije bb, 71000, Sarajevo, Sarajevo, Bosnia and Herzegovina
- Number of locations: 2 stores (2013)
- Area served: Bosnia and Herzegovina
- Key people: Aldin Osmanagić (CEO)
- Products: Cable television Pay television Broadband Internet; Fixed telephony
- Subsidiaries: HS Kablovska televizija
- Website: www.hs-hkb.ba

M&H Company (full legal name: M&H Company d.o.o. Sarajevo) is one of the leading cable television and broadband Internet service provider in Bosnia and Herzegovina. It is headquartered in Sarajevo.
The M&H Company group members are HS Kablovska televizija and HKBnet. The main activity of M&H Company group is the provision of cable television, digital television, Broadband Internet|cable internet access and fixed telephony in the following Bosnian cities: Sarajevo, Kakanj, Zenica and Travnik.

== Cable TV Channel line-up ==
M&H Company currently (September 2013) offers 64 TV channels via cable television in Sarajevo.
