= RA-TV =

Bosnian cable television channel

- Country: Bosnia and Herzegovina
- Broadcast area: Zenica-Doboj Canton
- Headquarters: Titova 10 (Shopping Centar Jelah), Jelah, Tešanj

Programming
- Language: Bosnian language
- Picture format: 4:3 576i (SDTV)

Ownership
- Owner: RA-TV d.o.o. Tešanj, Informativno-prometno i uslužno društvo
- Key people: Amir Mušić

History
- Launched: 2013

RA-TV is a Bosnian local commercial cable television channel based in Jelah (Tešanj), Bosnia and Herzegovina. The program is mainly produced in Bosnian language.
