= Slobomir =

Slobomir Слобомир
- Interactive map of Slobomir
- Coordinates: 44.777243°N 19.320079°E
- Country: Bosnia and Herzegovina
- Entity: Republika Srpska

Government
  - Mayor: Slobodan Pavlović
- Time zone: UTC+1 (CET)
  - Summer (DST): UTC+2 (CEST)
- Website: www.slobomir.com

Slobomir (Cyrillic: Слобомир) is a new town project in Bosnia and Herzegovina. It is located on the Drina River near Bijeljina, part of the Bijeljina municipality. It was founded by Slobodan Pavlović, a Bosnian Serb businessman.

According to Pavlović, it is supposed to be one of the major cities of post-war Bosnia-Herzegovina. The city is planned be located in two countries, Bosnia-Herzegovina and Serbia, with the majority of it in Bosnia and Herzegovina. The city's name is a combination of its founder's name, Slobodan Pavlović, and his wife's name, Mira. Conveniently, its name means "the city of freedom and peace", from the words "sloboda", meaning freedom, and "mir", meaning peace.

The city is under construction on both sides of the Drina River, next to a major road from Bijeljina to Bogatić, in the vicinity of "Pavlović's bridge" which connects Bosnia and Herzegovina and Serbia.

The city's plans include a Pavlović Tower, intended to be the biggest building on the Balkan peninsula with 37 floors.

The largest completed buildings are Slobomir P University, the Pavlović International Bank, and the Slobomir duty-free zone.
