= NTV Amna =

- Country: Bosnia and Herzegovina
- Headquarters: Tešanj

Programming
- Language: Bosnian language
- Picture format: 4:3 576i (SDTV)

Ownership
- Owner: NTV "Amna" d.o.o. Informativno- prometno i uslužno društvo Tešanj
- Key people: Halid Hundur

History
- Launched: 8 October 1997; 29 years ago
- Closed: 20 January 2024; 2 years ago

Links
- Website: www.tvamna.ba

Availability

Terrestrial
- Terrestrial signal: Tešanj area

NTV Amna was a Bosnian-Herzegovinian local commercial television channel based in Tešanj, Bosnia and Herzegovina. The channel was established on October 8, 1997 and privately owned. Its programming was primarily in Bosnian language. The channel was shut down on January 20, 2024.
