= NTV Jasmin =

- Country: Bosnia and Herzegovina
- Headquarters: Vitez

Programming
- Language(s): Bosnian language
- Picture format: 4:3 576i (SDTV)

Ownership
- Owner: Nezavisna televizija "Jasmin" d.o.o. Vitez
- Key people: Jasmin Handžić

History
- Launched: 1998.

Links
- Website: www.tvjasmin.com

Availability

Terrestrial
- Terrestrial signal: Vitez 42 UHF

NTV Jasmin is a Bosnian local commercial television channel based in Vitez, Bosnia and Herzegovina. The program is mainly produced in Bosnian language.
