= RTV 7 Tuzla =

- Country: Bosnia and Herzegovina
- Broadcast area: Tuzla
- Headquarters: Tuzla

Programming
- Language: Bosnian language
- Picture format: 16:9 1080p HDTV

Ownership
- Owner: JP "Radio-televizija 7" d.o.o. Tuzla
- Sister channels: Radio Tuzla

History
- Launched: 2012

Links
- Website: www.rtv7.ba

RTV 7 Tuzla is a local Bosnian public cable television channel based in the city of Tuzla. It was established in 2012.

RTV 7 broadcasts a variety of programs such as local news, local sports, mosaic and documentaries. The programming is mainly produced in the Bosnian language.

Radio Tuzla is also part of public municipality services.
