= OSM TV =

- Country: Bosnia and Herzegovina
- Headquarters: Pale

Programming
- Language(s): Serbian
- Picture format: 4:3 576i (SDTV)

Ownership
- Owner: "Media Market" d.o.o. Pale
- Key people: Mirko Despić

Links
- Website: www.osmtv.com

Availability

Terrestrial
- Terrestrial signal: Istočno Sarajevo and Sarajevo area

OSM TV is a Bosnian commercial television channel based in Pale, Bosnia and Herzegovina. The program is mainly produced in Serbian. TV station was established in 1993 under the name "Otvorene Srpske Mreže". According to the recommendations and guidelines of the Communications Regulatory Agency of Bosnia and Herzegovina, the official name has been changed to OSM TV.
