= Grand TV =

Grand Narodna Televizija
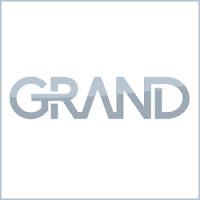
- Country: Serbia
- Headquarters: Belgrade

Programming
- Picture format: 16:9, HD

Ownership
- Owner: Grand Production
- Sister channels: Grand 2,

History
- Launched: April 16, 2014

Links
- Website: Grand Narodna Televizija

Grand TV is a cable/IPTV music television channel owned by Grand Production. It launched on 16 April 2014.

It broadcasts 24 hours a day, of which nine hours consist of live programming. Programming airs from nine TV studios in Košutnjak, of which three are large and six are small studios. During a break in broadcasting, the channel broadcasts lip syncing singer videos. This is the first music entertainment channel that deals not only with videos of singers, but also activities related to public life.

== Series ==
- 'Grand magazin' - a daily airing show. In this show viewers tune in via Skype and telephone. There are several presenters in shifts, and their task is to communicate with viewers who can order a song.
- 'Halo' - the show is broadcast twice a week, Tuesdays and Thursdays.
- 'Grand cocktail' - an "author show" by Goran Čomor.
- 'An Evening With ...' - a show that weekly features celebrities. They come as guests bring their colleagues, friends, family and sing their hits accompanied by an orchestra.
- Grand Novelties
- 'From Profile' - programs whose host is Vesna Milanović. In this show the guest is interviewed through different stages of his life, from childhood to the important moments in his career. There is a scroll of family photos in which the singer recalls events and times when they occurred.
- 'Grand disco' - programs whose leader is Milan Mitrovic, surrounded by beautiful dancers and attractive guests who sing their hits.
- 'Grand News' - showbiz news.
- 'Doctors for insomnia' - led by Goran Petrović. In this show they discuss topics much like a nighttime program.
- 'Gipsy & Friends - program run by Lidija Vukicevic and Jovana Nikolic. The show primarily airs Romano music.
- VIP Cookbook
- Sport News
- Wandering Camera
- Song for the soul - show airs weekly on Wednesday
- The Te
- That crazy world
