= RTV Vikom =

Bosnian commercial television channel

RTV Vikom d.o.o.
- Country: Bosnia and Herzegovina
- Headquarters: Gradiška

Programming
- Language: Serbian
- Picture format: 4:3 576i SDTV

Ownership
- Owner: "VIKOM" radio i televizija Gradiška d.o.o.
- Key people: Vinko Perić

History
- Launched: 1997

Links
- Website: www.vikom.tv

RTV Vikom is a Bosnian commercial television channel based in Gradiška, Bosnia and Herzegovina. The program is mainly produced in Serbian. The TV station was established in 1997.
