= BDC Televizija =

- Country: Bosnia and Herzegovina
- Broadcast area: Brčko
- Headquarters: Brčko District

Programming
- Language(s): Bosnian
- Picture format: 16:9 576i SDTV

Ownership
- Owner: "Proleter" d.o.o. Brčko
- Key people: Hariz Lišić (General director)

History
- Launched: 1999

Links
- Website: www.brcko.tv

BDC Televizija or BDC TV is a Bosnian commercial cable television channel, established 2009, based in Brčko District, Bosnia and Herzegovina.
The program is mainly produced in the Bosnian language.
