= RTV Živinice =

Bosnian public television channel

- Country: Bosnia and Herzegovina
- Broadcast area: Živinice
- Headquarters: Živinice

Programming
- Language(s): Bosnian language
- Picture format: 16:9 1080i HDTV

Ownership
- Owner: JP "Radio televizija Živinice"

History
- Launched: 4 May 1992 (television)

Links
- Website: www.rtvzivinice.tv

Availability

Terrestrial
- Živinice: UFH

RTV Živinice or Televizija Živinice is a local Bosnian public television channel based in the Živinice municipality. It was established on 4 May 1992 as one of the first TV stations in independent Bosnia and Herzegovina. In 1996, Television Živinice was registered as a public company, and in 2000, it was preregistered as a public institution founded by the Municipality of Živinice.

RTV Živinice broadcasts a variety of programs such as local news, sports, and documentaries. Programs are primarily produced in Bosnian.
