= Posavina TV =

- Country: Bosnia and Herzegovina
- Headquarters: Brčko

Programming
- Language(s): Croatian language
- Picture format: 16:9 576i SDTV

Ownership
- Owner: "NETIKS" d.o.o. Brčko
- Key people: Andrija Mendeš

History
- Launched: 2009

Links
- Website: www.posavinatv.com

Posavina TV is a Bosnian local commercial television channel based in Brčko, Bosnia and Herzegovina. The program is mainly produced in Croatian.
