= NEON TV =

- Country: Bosnia and Herzegovina
- Broadcast area: Tuzla Canton
- Headquarters: Kalesija

Programming
- Language(s): Bosnian language
- Picture format: 16:9 (HDTV)

Ownership
- Owner: NEON SOLUCIJE d.o.o. Kalesija

Links
- Website: www.ntv.ba

NEON TV or NEON Televizija is a Bosnian local commercial Cable television channel based in Kalesija, Bosnia and Herzegovina. The program is mainly produced in Bosnian language and it is available in Tuzla Canton in HD resolution.
