= Communications Regulatory Agency of Bosnia and Herzegovina =

Communications Regulatory Agency
- Regulatorna agencija za komunikacije

Agency overview
- Formed: 2 March 2001
- Preceding agencies: Independent Media Commission; Telecommunications Regulatory Agency
- Headquarters: Sarajevo, Bosnia and Herzegovina
- Agency executive: Draško Milinović, Director
- Parent agency: None (Independent)
- Website: www.rak.ba

The Communications Regulatory Agency of Bosnia and Herzegovina (CRA) (Bosnian/Croatian/Serbian: Regulatorna agencija za komunikacije, Регулаторна агенције за комуникације) is the regulatory agency for electronic communications in Bosnia and Herzegovina.

The director of the agency is, since 14 July 2020, Draško Milinović. Milinović started as a member of cabinet of Željka Cvijanović and chief of cabinet of Milorad Dodik, and was appointed in 2014 as head of Radio Televizija Republike Srpske (RTRS). During Milinović's mandate, RTRS has been sanctioned multiple times by the CRA for non-respect of editorial standards, including for historical revisionist statements as regards the 25 May 1995 Tuzla massacre.

Communications Regulatory Agency of Bosnia and Herzegovina is member of the Central and Eastern European Working Group.
