= MTV Igman =

- Country: Bosnia and Herzegovina
- Headquarters: Pazarić

Programming
- Language(s): Bosnian language
- Picture format: 16:9 1080i (HDTV)

Ownership
- Owner: Društvo za unutrašnju i spoljnu trgovinu i usluge "Bandić" d.o.o. Pazarić
- Key people: Vildana Bandić Hujić

History
- Launched: 1993
- Former names: Muslimanska televizija IGMAN (1993–2000)

Links
- Website: www.mtvigman.ba

Availability

Terrestrial
- Terrestrial signal: Sarajevo 41 UHF; Sarajevo 49 UHF

MTV Igman is a Bosnian local commercial television channel based in Pazarić near Sarajevo.

TV station was established in 1993 under the name "Muslimanska televizija IGMAN". According to the recommendations and guidelines of the Communications Regulatory Agency of Bosnia and Herzegovina, the official name has been changed to MTV Igman. Religious and educational program is mainly produced in Bosnian language (from 10:00h–24:00h). Local radio station Radio Hayat is also part of this company.
