= RTV Maglaj =

Bosnian television channel

- Country: Bosnia and Herzegovina
- Headquarters: Maglaj

Programming
- Language(s): Bosnian language
- Picture format: 4:3 576i (SDTV)

Ownership
- Owner: "RTV Maglaj" d.o.o.
- Key people: Mahir Čaušić

History
- Launched: 1992

Links
- Website: www.rtvmaglaj.com

Availability

Terrestrial
- Maglaj area: 42 C UHF

RTV Maglaj or Televizija Maglaj is a Bosnian local commercial television channel based in Maglaj. The program is produced in Bosnian language 20 hours per day. Local radio station Radio Maglaj is also part of this company.
