= NTVIC Kakanj =

NTV IC Kakanj
- Country: Bosnia and Herzegovina
- Headquarters: Kakanj

Programming
- Language(s): Bosnian language
- Picture format: 4:3 576i (SDTV)

Ownership
- Owner: Nezavisna televizija "NTV- IC" d.o.o. Kakanj
- Key people: Almedin Trako

Links
- Website: www.ntvic.ba

Availability

Terrestrial
- Terrestrial signal: Kakanj area

NTV IC is a Bosnian local commercial television channel based in Kakanj, Bosnia and Herzegovina. The program is mainly produced in Bosnian language.
