= RTV Sana =

Bosnian public cable TV channel

- Country: Bosnia and Herzegovina
- Broadcast area: Sanski Most
- Headquarters: Sanski Most

Programming
- Language(s): Bosnian language
- Picture format: 4:3 576i SDTV

Ownership
- Owner: JP RTV "Sana" Sanski Most
- Sister channels: Radio Sana

History
- Launched: 21 June 2016

Links
- Website: www.radiosana.ba

RTV Sana or Radio televizija Sana is a local Bosnian public cable television channel based in Sanski Most municipality. It was established in 2016 when local Radio Sana started television broadcasting.

RTV Sana broadcasts a variety of programs such as local news, local sports, mosaic and documentaries. Program is mainly produced in Bosnian language.

Radio Sana is also part of public municipality services.
