= RTV Cazin =

- Country: Bosnia and Herzegovina
- Headquarters: Cazin

Programming
- Language: Bosnian language
- Picture format: 4:3 576i SDTV

Ownership
- Owner: Javno preduzeće radio-televizija d.o.o. Cazin
- Key people: Indira Topčagić

History
- Launched: 1993

Links
- Website: www.rtvcazin.ba

Availability

Terrestrial
- Cazin: 42 UHF
- Pećigrad: 31 UHF
- Donja Koprivna: 58 UHF
- Brekovica: 31 UHF

RTV Cazin (RTV C) or Radio Televizija Cazin is a public TV channel founded by Assembly of Cazin municipality. It was established in 1993 (as RTV Cazin) and the program is mainly produced in Bosnian language. Headquarters of RTV Cazin is located in city of Cazin, Bosnia and Herzegovina. Local TV shows promote specific culture, tradition and customs characteristic for the Bosanska Krajina area and whole BIH.

This television channel broadcasts a variety of programs such as local news, documentaries, talk shows, local sports, mosaic and children's program. New Year's program of RTV Cazin (Cazinski nadrealisti) has long been one of the most famous in Bosnia and Herzegovina and by funny skits and original synchronization are known throughout the Balkans and the Bosnian diaspora.

Radio Cazin was established in 1975 and is also part of public municipality services.
