= Hema TV =

- Country: Bosnia and Herzegovina
- Headquarters: Sarajevo

Programming
- Language(s): Bosnian language
- Picture format: 4:3 576i (SDTV)

Ownership
- Owner: M&H Company d.o.o.

History
- Launched: 2008

Links
- Website: www.hematv.ba

Hema TV is a Bosnian local commercial television channel based in Sarajevo, Bosnia and Herzegovina. The program is mainly produced in Bosnian language, 24 hours via cable networks.
