= RTV Vogošća =

Bosnian public TV and radio broadcaster

- Country: Bosnia and Herzegovina
- Broadcast area: Sarajevo Canton, Bosnia and Herzegovina
- Headquarters: Vogošća

Programming
- Language: Bosnian
- Picture format: 16:9 1080i HDTV

Ownership
- Owner: JP "Radio i televizija Vogošća" d.o.o. Vogošća
- Key people: Edin Spahić (Director)

History
- Founded: 13 March 1996
- Launched: 18 July 1996 (Radio); 10 December 1997 (TV)

Links
- Website: rtvvogosca.ba

Availability

Terrestrial
- Vogošća: 34 UHF
- Sarajevo: 24 UHF

RTV Vogošća (Radio Televizija Vogošća) is a public local broadcaster founded by the Assembly of the Vogošća Municipality in Bosnia and Herzegovina. The company operates both a television channel and a radio station, Radio Vogošća, and currently employs 12 media professionals.

The station focuses on local news, cultural promotion, and the traditions of the Sarajevo Canton. Its programming is primarily produced and broadcast in the Bosnian language.

== History ==
JP Radio Televizija Vogošća was founded on March 13, 1996. Following the acquisition of technical equipment and the assembly of a professional team, Radio Vogošća began regular broadcasting on July 18, 1996.

Seventeen months later, on December 10, 1997, the television division launched an experimental signal. Regular television programming for Televizija Vogošća officially commenced on April 6, 1998.

Over the decades, the station has grown into one of the most significant local media outlets in Bosnia and Herzegovina. Its terrestrial signal reaches approximately 500,000 potential viewers and listeners, while cable and IPTV distribution allow the channel to be viewed nationwide and globally. For its contribution to the local community, the station was awarded the Silver Plaque of the Vogošća Municipality in 2003 and the Gold Plaque in 2004.

== Programming ==
RTV Vogošća produces and broadcasts a wide variety of content focused on the Sarajevo Canton and the state of Bosnia and Herzegovina. The programming includes:

- Local news and informative bulletins
- Talk shows and debate programs
- Documentaries
- Local sports coverage
- Children's educational and entertainment programs

== Mission and Vision ==
As a public service provider, RTV Vogošća's mission is to provide timely, accurate, and objective information to the citizens of Vogošća. It aims to strengthen local identity and social cohesion while promoting democracy and transparency of public institutions.
