= Izvorna TV =

- Country: Bosnia and Herzegovina
- Headquarters: Živinice

Programming
- Language: Bosnian language
- Picture format: 16:9 1080i (HDTV)

Ownership
- Owner: RETRO MEDIA d.o.o.
- Key people: Senad Trumić (company owner); Mensur Habibović (general director); Admir Gavranović (music producer); Dragan Tešić (long-term anchor); Edita Džinić (long-term anchor)

History
- Launched: 5 January 2015

Links
- Website: www.izvornatv.com

Availability

Streaming media
- Online streaming: Official YouTube channel "Priče iz Bosne"

Izvorna TV is a Bosnian commercial cable television channel based in Živinice, Bosnia and Herzegovina. This television channel mainly broadcasts music videos in the genres of Bosnian root music, turbo-folk, sevdah and other programs related to local music and folk traditions. The content is produced in Bosnian language and it is available via cable systems throughout the Bosnia and Herzegovina and worldwide (targeting the Bosnian diaspora).

== History ==
Izvorna TV started as a project of the Bosnian Živinice-based entrepreneur Senad Trumić. Upon acquisition of the record label Lait Music by his music and budget video game publishing company Extra Music in 2014, Trumić gained rights to hundreds of music videos in the genre of Bosnian root music. Musical acts formerly associated with Lait Music mostly kept publishing new albums under Trumić's Extra Music, while the production and recording work was spun off to the company Studio Izvor owned by the musician-producer duo of brothers Semir Gavranović and Admir Gavranović of the Braća Gavranović band.

Holding publishing rights to the majority of existing music videos in the root music genre as well as future releases produced by Studio Izvor, starting a television channel was a natural business move for Trumić. In the first two months of existence Izvorna TV was broadcasting music videos exclusively. In March 2015, first original programming began airing. Trumić's media companies Extra Music and RETRO MEDIA (the official company behind the Izvorna TV brand) still remain closely tied to Studio Izvor. Admir Gavranović of Studio Izvor is also involved in the production of programs for Izvorna TV and frequently appears as host.

== Programming ==
Most original programming of Izvorna TV is produced on a weekly basis between October and May. In the period between June and September re-runs of episodes produced in the past season are aired. Outside of the regular weekly shows the channel broadcasts streams of music videos.

=== Notable weekly shows ===
- Moje selo i sijelo (meaning "My Village and Gathering") – Produced since March 2015, Moje selo i sijelo is a pre-recorded Sunday evening show featuring song requests and personal messages from viewers gathered throughout the week. It is hosted by Dragan Tešić, an actor and co-founder of Tuzla-based Draft Theater. Unlike the other song request show – Ispunjavamo želje – viewer messages are not only displayed on the screen, the host reads them and usually reacts to them.
- Ispunjavamo želje (meaning "We Grant Wishes") – A live show hosted by Edita Džinić. Viewers request music videos through Viber, often including greetings and congratulations to their relatives and other personal messages. Such messages are then displayed on screen along with the requested music video.
- Bosanska veselja (meaning "Bosnian Festivities") – Airing since September 2015, Bosanska veselja are video reports from public festivities across the country, including live music performances. In 2016 Izvorna TV began organizing their own festivities featuring live performances of musicians and groups attendees recognize from the channel's music videos. Show hosts include Dragan Tešić, Edita Džinić, Admir Gavranović and Riči Raja.
- Sirova snaga BH koride (meaning "The Raw Power of Bosnian-Herzegovinian Corridas") – Recordings of bull wrestling events from across Bosnia and Herzegovina and Croatia. In 2016 and 2017, Izvorna TV held two self-organized bull wrestling festivals in Živinice. The show first aired in April 2015.
- Priče iz Bosne (meaning "Stories from Bosnia") – Documentary series about rural life in Bosnia and Herzegovina and related folklore traditions. First episode aired in November 2017.
- Ričijeve avanture (meaning "Riči's Adventures") – A collaboration project of Izvorna TV and Bosnian comedy YouTuber and professional well builder Riči Raja. The show features Riči Raja driving across former Yugoslavia seeking water, interviewing people and promoting back to nature lifestyle.
- Pjesma iz sehare (meaning "Song from a Chest") – Acoustic performances of traditional Bosnian root music songs, featuring popular musicians of this genre viewers recognize from contemporary music videos.
- Život i merak (meaning "Life and Good Times") – Documentary series about the history of Bosnian root music bands, hosted by Edita Džinić. The host usually interviews current and pasts musicians from these acts.
- Lijepa Bosna, lijepi sevdah (meaning "Beautiful Bosnia, Beautiful Sevdah") – Curated selections of music videos of the sevdah genre, airing since September 2015.
