= RTV Goražde =

- Country: Bosnia and Herzegovina
- Headquarters: Goražde

Programming
- Language: Bosnian language
- Picture format: 4:3 576i (SDTV)

Ownership
- Owner: J.P. "Radio-televizija Bosansko-podrinjskog kantona Goražde" d.o.o. Goražde
- Key people: v.d. Jasmina Čohodar

Links
- Website: www.rtvbpk.ba

Availability

Terrestrial
- Terrestrial signal: Bosnian Podrinje area

RTV Goražde or Televizija BPK (full legal name: RADIO-TELEVIZIJA BOSANSKO PODRINJSKOG KANTONA GORAŽDE) is a public TV channel founded in 1996 by Assembly of Bosnian Podrinje Canton Goražde.
