= TV Alfa =

Alfa TV - Televizija Alfa Društvo za prenos i emitovanje programa d.o.o. Sarajevo
- Country: Bosnia and Herzegovina
- Broadcast area: Balkan
- Headquarters: Sarajevo

Programming
- Language: Bosnian language
- Picture format: 16:9 1080i (HD)

Ownership
- Owner: Pink Media Group

Links
- Website: www.alfatv.ba

Availability

Terrestrial
- Terrestrial signal: Territory of Bosnia and Herzegovina, Balkan region

Streaming media
- Telemach - kanal 12, Moja TV - kanal 21, Logosoft - kanal 16, mtel - kanal 89, Supernova BiH - kanal 9

ALFA TV is a Bosnian commercial television channel based in Sarajevo.

Headquarters of ALFA TV are located in the building of the "Avaz Twist Tower" in Sarajevo. The program is mainly produced in the Bosnian language.
