= City TV (Bosnia and Herzegovina) =

- Country: Bosnia and Herzegovina
- Headquarters: Mostar

Programming
- Language: Bosnian language
- Picture format: 16:9 1080i HDTV

Ownership
- Owner: SEB GROUP d.o.o. Mostar
- Key people: Eldin Palata

History
- Launched: 15 April 2015

Links
- Website: www.citytv.ba

City TV is a Bosnian local commercial television channel based in Mostar, Bosnia and Herzegovina. The program is mainly produced in the Bosnian language.
