= Super TV (Bosnia and Herzegovina) =

Bosnian IPTV provider

- Native name: Logosoft Super TV
- Type: Ltd. (Public)
- Industry: Telecommunication
- Predecessor: Logosoft d.o.o.
- Founded: (March 11, 2009)
- Headquarters: Sarajevo, Bosnia and Herzegovina
- Area served: Bosnia and Herzegovina
- Products: Super TV; LoGo
- Services: IPTV
- Owner: Telekom Srpske
- Parent: Logosoft
- Website: www.logosoft.ba www.mtel.ba

Super TV is the first Bosnian IPTV provider, owned by Logosoft.

The service was launched on 11 March 2009 in Sarajevo. In January 2015, the company m: tel bought for 24 million BAM majority stake (65%) in Logosoft.

Super TV is Internet protocol television (IPTV), which is based on xDSL technology and provides a high degree of interactivity and personalization of television content. It provides various thematic channels, HD and timeshift channels, video on demand, video recording, the use of an electronic program guide (EPG) and other similar services. The company offers integrated packages (LoGo) with fixed telephony, mobile telephony, IPTV and Internet access.

== Channel line-up ==
Customers of Super TV must purchase or rent an IPTV set-top box and subscribe to one of the ten TV packages: Nice Paket, Very Nice Paket, Great Paket, FilmBox Paket, Zadruga Paket, HBO Paket, Cinemax Paket or HBO Premium HD Paket.

Nice Paket

- 1 – BHT 1 HD
- 2 – BHT 1 SD
- 3 – FTV HD
- 4 – RTRS
- 5 – RTRS PLUS
- 6 – TVSA HD
- 7 – OBN HD
- 8 – TV Alfa
- 9 – Pink BH
- 10 – Nova BH HD
- 11 – UNA TV HD
- 12 – Face TV HD
- 13 – Al Jazeera Balkans HD
- 14 – Hayat TV HD
- 15 – HAYAT Plus HD
- 16 – O KANAL HD
- 17 – RTV BN HD
- 18 – OTV Valentino
- 19 – Alternativna TV HD
- 20 – RTV Vogošća HD
- 21 – ELTA 1 HD
- 22 – RTV Zenica HD
- 23 – RTV TK
- 24 – TV Slon HD
- 25 – RTV 7 HD
- 26 – RTVIS
- 27 – RTV HB HD
- 28 – K3
- 29 – City TV
- 30 – Kanal 6 HD
- 31 – MTV Igman
- 32 – Televizija 5 HD
- 33 – BIR TV HD
- 34 – Laudato TV HD
- 35 – HRT 1 HD
- 36 – HRT 2 HD
- 37 – HRT 3 HD
- 38 – HRT 4 HD
- 39 – RTL Televizija HD
- 40 – RTL 2 HR HD
- 41 – RTL Kockica HD
- 42 – RTL Living
- 43 – RTS 1 HD
- 44 – RTS 2 HD
- 45 – RTS 3 HD
- 46 – RTS Svet HD
- 47 – RTS Drama
- 48 – RTS Trezor
- 49 – RTS Kolo
- 50 – RTS Život
- 51 – RTS Muzika
- 52 – RTS Poletarac
- 53 – RTS Klasika
- 54 – Euronews Serbia HD
- 55 – Bloomberg Adria HD
- 56 – Blic TV HD
- 57 – Kurir TV HD
- 58 – Informer TV HD
- 59 – Super Sat TV (black screen)
- 60 – Tanjug TV
- 61 – K1
- 62 – K::CN Kopernikus 1
- 63 – K::CN Music 2
- 64 – K::CN Svet+ 3
- 65 – Happy TV
- 66 – TV1000
- 67 – DIVA
- 68 – FilmBox Stars
- 69 – FilmBox Extra HD
- 70 – TDC HD
- 71 – Cinema TV
- 72 – Klasik TV
- 73 – Film Klub
- 74 – SUPERSTAR TV HD
- 75 – SUPERSTAR 2
- 76 – AXN
- 77 – AMC
- 78 – Fox HD
- 79 – Fox Movies HD
- 80 – FOX Life HD
- 81 – FOX Crime HD
- 82 – Epic Drama HD
- 83 – Sci Fi HD
- 84 – Euro Cinema 1
- 85 – Euro Cinema 2
- 86 – Euro Cinema 3
- 87 – Euro Cinema 4
- 88 – Discovery Channel HD
- 89 – Animal Planet HD
- 90 – TLC Balkans HD
- 91 – ID
- 92 – History Channel
- 93 – National Geographic HD
- 94 – National Geographic Wild HD
- 95 – Viasat Nature HD
- 96 – Viasat History HD
- 97 – Viasat Explorer HD
- 98 – DOX TV
- 99 – E! HD
- 100 – TV DR
- 101 – 24Kitchen HD
- 102 – Agro TV HD
- 103 – Travel Channel
- 104 – Balkan Trip HD
- 105 – Eko vizija HD
- 106 – CBS Reality
- 107 – NASA TV HD
- 108 – Jim Jam
- 109 – Baby TV
- 110 – Minimax
- 111 – Nickelodeon HD
- 112 – Nick jr.
- 113 – Nicktoons
- 114 – Dexy TV HD
- 115 – Hayatovci HD
- 116 – Tropik TV HD
- 117 – Kazbuka
- 118 – Disney Channel
- 119 – Disney Junior
- 120 – Cartoon Network
- 121 – Cartoonito
- 122 – Premier Liga HD
- 123 – Arena Premium 1 HD
- 124 – Arena Premium 2 HD
- 125 – Arena Premium 3 HD
- 126 – Arena Sport 1 HD
- 127 – Arena Sport 2 HD
- 128 – Arena Sport 3 HD
- 129 – Arena Sport 4 HD
- 130 – Arena Sport 5 HD
- 131 – Arena Sport 6 HD
- 132 – Arena Sport 1x2 HD
- 133 – Arena Esport HD
- 134 – Liverpool TV HD
- 135 – Eurosport 1
- 136 – Eurosport 2
- 137 – Arena Fight HD
- 138 – Extreme Sports Channel
- 139 – KUVO TV HD
- 140 – Moj Astrolog HD
- 141 – HAYAT Folk HD
- 142 – HAYAT Music HD
- 143 – DM SAT
- 144 – BN Music HD
- 145 – Hype TV
- 146 – Hype 2
- 147 – Toxic TV HD
- 148 – Toxic Rap HD
- 149 – Toxic Folk HD
- 150 – Pink Music
- 151 – Pink Music 2
- 152 – BMC TV HD
- 153 – MTV Europe
- 154 – Club MTV
- 155 – MTV Hits
- 156 – MTV Live HD
- 157 – MTV 00s
- 158 – MTV 90s
- 159 – MTV 80s
- 160 – Deutsche Welle TV HD
- 161 – Fox News HD
- 162 – Sky News
- 163 – CNN International
- 164 – France 24 HD
- 165 – Espreso TV
- 166 – Russia-24
- 167 – RTR-Planeta
- 168 – TRT World HD
- 169 – Al Jazeera English HD
- 170 – RTL (German TV channel)
- 171 – RTL Zwei
- 172 – VOX
- 173 – Fashion TV HD
- 174 – Pink Ha Ha
- 175 – Pink LOL
- 176 – Pink Action
- 177 – Pink Thriller
- 178 – Pink Crime & Mystery
- 179 – Pink Movies
- 180 – Pink Romance
- 181 – Pink Premium HD
- 182 – Pink Sci Fi & Fantasy
- 183 – Pink Film
- 184 – Pink Family
- 185 – Pink Comedy
- 186 – Pink Reality
- 187 – Pink HD
- 188 – RED TV HD
- 189 – Insta TV HD
- 190 – VESTI HD
- 191 – Pink M
- 192 – Pink Kids
- 193 – Pink Super Kids
- 194 – Pink Style
- 195 – Pink Show
- 196 – Pink Soap
- 197 – Pink World
- 198 – Pink Zabava
- 199 – City Play
- 200 – Bravo Music
- 201 – Pink Folk 2
- 202 – Pink Hits
- 203 – Pink Hits 2
- 204 – Pink Pedia
- 205 – Mozaik-Dokumentarni
- 206 – Mozaik-Sport
- 207 – Mozaik BH
- 208 – Mozaik Regija
- 209 – Mozaik Muzika
- 210 – Mozaik Dječiji
- 211 – Mozaik Filmski
- 212 – Logosoft Info HD
- 213 – Koreni
- 214 – Pink BH 1

Very Nice Paket

- 1 – Eurosport 1 HD
- 2 – Eurosport 2 HD
- 3 – Fight Network HD
- 4 – TnT Kids HD
- 5 – AXN Spin
- 6 – Pink World Cinema
- 7 – Pink Serije
- 8 – Pink Western
- 9 – Pink Horor
- 10 – Pink Classic
- 11 – Discovery Science HD
- 12 – ID HD
- 13 – Crime + Investigation
- 14 – History HD
- 15 – History 2 HD
- 16 – DTX HD
- 17 – Food Network HD
- 18 – Travel Channel HD
- 19 – HGTV HD
- 20 – Pink Fashion
- 21 – Pink Kuvar
- 22 – Pink Plus
- 23 – Pink Folk 1
- 24 – Pink Koncert
- 25 – Pink & Roll
- 26 – Pink Extra
- 27 – Sevdah TV HD
- 28 – Hustler HD
- 29 – Blue Hustler
- 30 – Playboy TV HD
- 31 – Private TV HD
- 32 – Dorcel TV HD
- 33 – Pink Erotic 1
- 34 – Pink Erotic 2
- 35 – Pink Erotic 3
- 36 – Pink Erotic 4
- 37 – Pink Erotic 5
- 38 – Pink Erotic 6
- 39 – Pink Erotic 7
- 40 – Pink Erotic 8
- 41 – Brazzers

Great Paket

- 1 – Eurosport 1 HD
- 2 – Eurosport 2 HD
- 3 – Fight Network HD
- 4 – FightBox HD
- 5 – Fast&Fun Box HD
- 6 – Gametoon HD
- 7 – TnT Kids HD
- 8 – AXN Spin
- 9 – Pink World Cinema
- 10 – Pink Serije
- 11 – Pink Western
- 12 – Pink Horor
- 13 – Pink Classic
- 14 – Filmbox Arthouse
- 15 – Filmbox Premium HD
- 16 – Discovery Science HD
- 17 – ID HD
- 18 – Crime + Investigation
- 19 – DocuBox HD
- 20 – History HD
- 21 – History 2 HD
- 22 – DTX HD
- 23 – Food Network HD
- 24 – Travel Channel HD
- 25 – HGTV HD
- 26 – FashionBox
- 27 – Pink Fashion
- 28 – Pink Kuvar
- 29 – Pink Plus
- 30 – Pink Folk 1
- 31 – Pink Koncert
- 32 – Pink & Roll
- 33 – Pink Extra
- 34 – 360 TuneBox
- 35 – Sevdah TV HD
- 36 – Hustler HD
- 37 – Blue Hustler
- 38 – Playboy TV HD
- 39 – Private TV HD
- 40 – Dorcel TV HD
- 41 – Erox
- 42 – Eroxxx HD
- 43 – Pink Erotic 1
- 44 – Pink Erotic 2
- 45 – Pink Erotic 3
- 46 – Pink Erotic 4
- 47 – Pink Erotic 5
- 48 – Pink Erotic 6
- 49 – Pink Erotic 7
- 50 – Pink Erotic 8
- 51 – Brazzers
- 52 – HBO HD
- 53 – HBO 2 HD
- 54 – HBO 3 HD
- 55 - HBO ON DEMAND HD
- 56 - HBO MAX
- 57 – Cinemax 1 HD
- 58 – Cinemax 2 HD
- 59 – Zadruga Live 1 HD
- 60 – Zadruga Live 2 HD
- 61 – Zadruga Live 3 HD
- 62 – Zadruga Live 4 HD

FilmBox Paket

- 1 – FightBox HD
- 2 – Fast&Fun Box HD
- 3 – Gametoon HD
- 4 – Filmbox Arthouse
- 5 – Filmbox Premium HD
- 6 – DocuBox HD
- 7 – FashionBox
- 8 – 360 TuneBox
- 9 – Erox
- 10 – Eroxxx HD

Zadruga Paket

- 1 – Zadruga Live 1 HD
- 2 – Zadruga Live 2 HD
- 3 – Zadruga Live 3 HD
- 4 – Zadruga Live 4 HD

HBO HD Paket

- 1 – HBO HD
- 2 – HBO 2 HD
- 3 – HBO 3 HD

Cinemax HD Paket

- 1 – Cinemax 1 HD
- 2 – Cinemax 2 HD

HBO Premium HD Paket

- 1 – HBO HD
- 2 – HBO 2 HD
- 3 – HBO 3 HD
- 4 - HBO ON DEMAND HD
- 5 - HBO MAX
- 6 – Cinemax 1 HD
- 7 – Cinemax 2 HD

== See also ==
- List of cable television companies in BiH
- List of radio stations in Bosnia and Herzegovina
- Television in Bosnia and Herzegovina
