= BIR TV =

Bosnian commercial cable/IPTV television channel

- Country: Bosnia and Herzegovina
- Broadcast area: Bosnia and Herzegovina; Worldwide
- Headquarters: Sarajevo

Programming
- Language: Bosnian language
- Picture format: 16:9 1080i (HDTV)

Ownership
- Owner: Islamska zajednica u Bosni i Hercegovini - Media centar d.o.o Sarajevo
- Sister channels: Radio BIR, Preporod (Weekly newspapers), MINA News agency,

Links
- Website: www.tv.bir.ba

BIR TV or BIR Televizija is Bosnian commercial cable/IPTV television channel based in Sarajevo operated by Islamic Community of Bosnia and Herzegovina. The headquarters of Radio and Television of the Islamic Community of Bosnia and Herzegovina - BIR is located in the building of the Gazi Husrev-bey's Library in Sarajevo (Gazi Husrev-begova 56A).

TV station was established on 24 April 2020 which was also the first day of Ramadan and it broadcasts religious and educational program. Program is mainly produced in the Bosnian language in high definition.

Beside BIR TV HD, Islamic Community of Bosnia and Herzegovina is, via Media centar d.o.o. Sarajevo, also owner of Preporod weekly newspapers, Islamic radio station - Radio BIR, MINA News agency and Preporod.info website.

== See also ==
- Radio BIR
- MTV Igman
- Televizija 5
