= Radio Studio D =

Bosnian radio station

- Srebrenik; Bosnia and Herzegovina
- Broadcast area: Tuzla Canton
- Frequencies: Srebrenik 99.4 MHz; Banovići 97.4 MHz
- RDS: STUDIO-D

Programming
- Language: Bosnian language
- Format: Local news, talk and music

Ownership
- Owner: PRIMAT PLUS d.o.o. Srebrenik
- Sister stations: TATABRADA

History
- Founded: September 4, 1997

Technical information
- Licensing authority: CRA BiH
- Transmitter coordinates: 44°42′N 18°29′E
- Repeaters: Srebrenik/Matare; Banovići/Tulovići

Links
- Website: www.studiod.ba

Radio Studio D is a Bosnian local commercial radio station, broadcasting from Srebrenik, Bosnia and Herzegovina. This radio station broadcasts a variety of programs such as music and local news.

Program is mainly produced in Bosnian language at two FM frequencies and it is available in the city of Srebrenik as well as in nearby municipalities in Tuzla Canton and Zenica-Doboj area.

Radio Studio D was founded on 4 September 1997. The owner of the local radio station is the company Primat Plus d.o.o. Srebrenik which also operates cable television channel TATABRADA.

Estimated number of listeners of Radio Studio D is around 176.010.

== Frequencies ==
- Srebrenik 99.4 MHz
- Banovići 97.4 MHz

== See also ==
- List of radio stations in Bosnia and Herzegovina
- Radio Srebrenik
- Radio Gračanica
- Radio Gradačac
- Radio Tuzla
- Radio Slon
- Radio BIR
