= Mreža plus =

- Type: Private syndicated network
- Country: Bosnia and Herzegovina
- Headquarters: Sarajevo
- Broadcast area: Bosnia and Herzegovina
- Owner: NTV Hayat; Alternativna TV; TV Tuzla; RTM Mostar; HTV Oscar C
- Launch date: 2001
- Dissolved: 01 February 2011
- Callsigns: mreža plus
- Callsign meaning: network plus
- Affiliates: TV Travnik; RTV Bugojno; NTV Jasmin
- Official website: www.mrezaplus.ba*
- Replaced by: Program Plus; TV1Mreža
- Notes *not available now

Mreža plus was a Bosnian television network founded in 2001.

With a syndicated broadcasting programme under the "Mreža plus" label, TV stations have managed to cover a large part of the territory of Bosnia and Herzegovina, including the most important urban areas. Broadcasters and the founders of the joint program were five television stations in the major Bosnian cities: NTV Hayat from Sarajevo, Alternativna TV from Banja Luka, TV Tuzla from Tuzla, RTV Mostar and HTV Oscar C from Mostar.

Other TV centers have, as partners, quickly joined to the "Mreža plus" network, and these centers were: TV Travnik in Travnik, RTV Zenica in Zenica, RTV Bugojno in Bugojno, NTV Jasmin from Vitez, RTV Maglaj from Maglaj and TV Rudo from Rudo. The network has achieved total coverage of 85% of the population of BiH and represented a new opportunity for major advertisers to reach demographic groups which are potentially interesting to their clients.

Ten years of the existence of "Network Plus" was ended with the lawsuits and the formation of a new group called "Program Plus". Two main TV stations that were the founders of "Network Plus" was "NTV Hayat" from Sarajevo and "Alternativna TV" from Banja Luka. In early February 2011 they have left "Mreža plus" and formed a new group called "Program Plus". Hayat and ATV apparently achieved 99 percent of viewers all over the network. At the general meeting of the association, they were outvoted by the three stations that have a minor share in viewership. These TV stations have been changed statute and elected a new director with a request to carry out a financial control of the business association. A few months took the parallel broadcasting of the same TV content on two TV networks (Plus program and ex Mreža plus members). At the same time the court denied the Statute of the new, truncated "Network Plus" which were later joined by some of the new TV stations.

== Previously broadcast on Mreža plus ==
- The Sopranos,
- Odjednom Susan (Suddenly Susan),
- L.A. Heat,
- Pacific Blue,
- Hitna Pomoć (ER)
- Jack & Jill
- Svi vole Rejmonda Everybody loves Raymond
- Wild Card
- The Simpsons
- Six Feet Under
- The District
- Alias
- Formula 1
- Mermaid Melody Pichi Pichi Pitch
