= Radio Maglaj =

Bosnian radio station

Maglaj; Bosnia and Herzegovina
- Broadcast area: Zenica-Doboj Canton
- Frequency: Maglaj 94.0 MHz

Programming
- Language: Bosnian language
- Format: Local news, talk and music

Ownership
- Operator: RTV Maglaj

History
- First air date: May 9, 1971; 2000

Technical information
- Licensing authority: CRA BiH
- Transmitter coordinates: 44°33′N 18°06′E
- Repeater: Maglaj/Sikola

Links
- Website: www.rtv-maglaj.com

Radio Maglaj is a Bosnian local commercial radio station, broadcasting from Maglaj, Bosnia and Herzegovina. This radio station broadcasts a variety of programs such music and local news. Local television channel, TV Maglaj is also part of company (RTV Maglaj d.o.o. Maglaj).

Program is mainly produced in Bosnian language at one FM frequency (Maglaj 94.0 MHz) and it is available in the city of Maglaj as well as in nearby municipalities in Zenica-Doboj Canton and Tuzla Canton area. Radio station mainly broadcasts folk and popular music, with informative and entertaining talk shows.

Estimated number of listeners of Radio Maglaj is around 23.225.

== History ==
Radio Maglaj was founded on 9 May 1971 as local/municipal Radio Sarajevo network affiliate, from 1971 until 1992, when war in Bosnia and Herzegovina started. During the war, with the establishment of the new national public service broadcaster RTVBiH - Radio BiH (now BHRT - BH Radio 1) radio stations from the former Radio Sarajevo 2 local network generally continued to operate as local public radio stations under the jurisdiction of local authorities in Bosnia and Herzegovina (municipalities, cantons).

During the Siege of Maglaj, Radio Maglaj constantly broadcast a program, "Fenix" Televizija (Television), in addition to informing, also had the role of documenting archival material, and Maglajske novine (Maglaj newspapers) also began to appear.

In 2000, Radio Maglaj was re-registered in Communications Regulatory Agency of Bosnia and Herzegovina as private, commercial radio station.

== Frequencies ==
- Maglaj 94.0 MHz

== See also ==
- List of radio stations in Bosnia and Herzegovina
- Antena Radio Jelah
- Radio Zos
- Radio Zenica
- Radio Tuzla
- Radio Tešanj
