= RTV USK =

Bosnian public television channel

- Country: Bosnia and Herzegovina
- Broadcast area: Una-Sana Canton
- Headquarters: Bihać

Programming
- Language(s): Bosnian language
- Picture format: 4:3 576i (SDTV)

Ownership
- Owner: Javno preduzeće "Radio televizija Unsko-sanskog kantona" d.o.o. Bihać
- Key people: Gorica Bukić

History
- Launched: 22 December 1995 (founded as RTV USK)

Links
- Webcast: https://www.rtvusk.ba/live/radio.php
- Website: www.rtvusk.ba

Availability

Terrestrial
- Terrestrial signal: Bosanska Krajina

RTV USK or Radio Televizija Unsko-sanskog kantona is a Bosnian public television channel founded by Assembly of Una-Sana Canton. Local public radio station Radio USK is also part of this company.

Headquarters of RTV USK is located in the City of Bihać. The program is mainly produced in Bosnian language. RTV USK is the regional broadcaster (founded in 1995) that has modern equipment for broadcasting radio and television programs, as well as audio and video production. TV shows also promote multiculturalism and specific culture, tradition and customs characteristic for this region of Bosnia and Herzegovina.

Thanks to TV shows from its own production, RTVUSK programming becomes recognizable and widely viewed television station in the Bosanska Krajina area (Bihać, Cazin, Velika Kladuša, Bužim, Prijedor, Sanski Most, Bosanski Novi, Bosanska Krupa, Ključ, Bosanski Petrovac, Mrkonjić Grad). Estimated number of viewers population is about 430.456.

RTV USK is also member of the Bosnian television network called TV1Mreža.

Mreža TV is a television program with almost national coverage in Bosnia and Herzegovina, and jointly in partnership with O Kanal broadcast several regional public and private TV stations. Mreža TV airs popular series, movies and sports programs to viewers in BiH.

After the closure of the local public television channel "037TV" (television of the Bihać municipality), RTV USK is a in agreement with the Bihać Municipal Council took their broadcasting equipment.

== Current line-up ==
This television channel broadcasts a variety of programs such as news, talk shows, documentaries, sports, movies, mosaic, children's programs, etc.

- Dnevnik RTVUSK - main news programme (every night at 19:00h)
- Vijesti RTVUSK - news at 10:00h, 12:00h and 14:30h
- U fokusu - (In Focus) political talk show (live) about actual events in the Una-Sana Canton and Bosnia and Herzegovina.
- Hronika krajških gradova - (Cities Chronicle) news from the largest cities in the Bosanska Krajina region produced by NTV 101
- Eko kviz - (Eco Quiz) educational quiz show dedicated to protecting the environment and nature.
- Duhovni svijet - (The spiritual world) religious programme (for all confessions) that presents latest news and events in the local religious communities
- Kultura - (Culture) weekly review of current cultural events in the Una-Sana Canton
- TV Škola - (TV school) Children's program for pupils, parents and teachers.
- Moje dijete, savjetovalište za roditelje - (My child, advisory centre) educational TV programme for parents
- Timeout - TV show for teenagers
- Tragom sudbine - (Destiny) TV shows dedicated to life stories of ordinary citizens
- Sportska hronika - (Sports Chronicle) TV shows dedicated to local sports news
- USK nogomet - (USK Football) sports program dedicated to football
- Nedjeljom zajedno - (Sundays together) entertainment / collage program broadcast on Sunday afternoon
- Turistički putokaz - (Tourist signs) - TV show about tourism
- Auto shop magazin - TV show dedicated to news from the auto industry

=== Previously broadcast ===
- Živjeti zdravo - magazine about health, herbs, beauty and wellness
- Poduzetnik - TV show about the economy
- Priče sa Une - documentary TV shows about the Una River
- Krajiška zemlja - program about agriculture in the Una-Sana Canton
- Eko kutak - program about environmental protection issues
- TV Aukcija - charity program
- Razgovor s povodom - talk show
