= Program Plus =

Bosnian television network

Program plus
- Type: Private syndicated network
- Country: Bosnia and Herzegovina
- Headquarters: Sarajevo, Milana Preloga 12
- Broadcast area: Bosnia and Herzegovina
- Owner: Hayat TV; Alternativna TV
- Launch date: 01 February 2011
- Callsigns: Plus
- Affiliates: HTV Oscar C RTV Bugojno RTV Maglaj
- Official website: www.programplus.ba
- Replaced: Mreža plus

Program Plus is a Bosnian television network founded in 2011.

With a syndicated broadcasting programme under the "Program Plus" label, it is claimed that TV stations cover 85 percent of the territory of Bosnia and Herzegovina. "Program Plus" airs family series, telenovels, action movies, entertainment shows and sporting events.

Broadcasters and the founders of the joint program were two television stations in the major Bosnian cities: Hayat TV from Sarajevo and Alternativna TV from Banja Luka.

Other TV centers have joined to the "Program Plus" network as partner affiliates. These centers are: RTV Bugojno in Bugojno, RTV Maglaj from Maglaj and HTV Oscar C from Mostar.

Its direct competitor in BiH is Mreža TV syndicated network.
