= Mreža TV =

- Type: Private syndicated network
- Country: Bosnia and Herzegovina
- Headquarters: Sarajevo, Tešanjska 24 (Avaz Twist Tower)
- Broadcast area: Bosnia and Herzegovina
- Launch date: 26 February 2011
- Callsigns: Mreža
- Affiliates: O Kanal Televizija K3; TV HIT; TV Alfa; TV Slon Extra TV CNN
- Former affiliations: OSM TV Behar TV; NTV 101; HTV Oscar C 2 RTV USK; RTV TK; RTV Zenica; TV KISS RTM Mostar
- Official website: www.mrezatv.ba
- Replaced: TV1 Mreža

Mreža TV is a Bosnian television network founded in 2011.

With a syndicated broadcasting programme under the "Mreža" label, 8 TV stations have managed to cover 92.12 percent of the territory of Bosnia and Herzegovina, including major Bosnian cities (Sarajevo, Banja Luka, Mostar, Brčko, Tuzla).

Mreža TV airs TV series, telenovels, movies and entertainment shows. Its direct competitor in BiH is Program Plus network.

== Current broadcasters ==
- O Kanal from Sarajevo
- TV Alfa from Sarajevo
- Televizija K3 from Prnjavor
- TV HIT from Brčko
- TV Slon Extra from Tuzla
- Centralne Nacionalne Novosti from Sarajevo

== Former broadcasters ==
Former affiliations were:

- Behar TV
- OSM TV
- NTV 101
- HTV Oscar C 2
- RTV Zenica
- RTV USK
- RTV TK,
- RTM Mostar
