= Radio Slon =

Bosnian radio station

- Tuzla; Bosnia and Herzegovina
- Broadcast area: Tuzla Canton
- Frequency: Tuzla 89.0 MHz

Programming
- Language: Bosnian language
- Format: Local news, talk and music

Ownership
- Operator: RTV Slon
- Sister stations: TV Slon Extra; TV Slon Info

History
- First air date: December 27, 1995

Technical information
- Licensing authority: CRA BiH
- Transmitter coordinates: 44°32′17″N 18°40′34″E
- Repeater: Tuzla/Ilinčica

Links
- Webcast: Listen Live
- Website: www.rtvslon.ba

Radio Slon is a Bosnian local commercial radio station, broadcasting from Tuzla, Bosnia and Herzegovina. This radio station broadcasts a variety of programs such as local news, talk show, music, entertainment and comic program.

Radio Slon was founded on 27 December 1995 as private, commercial radio station by the company Vidik d.o.o. Tuzla (RTV Slon).

Program is mainly produced in Bosnian language at one FM frequency (Tuzla 89.0 MHz) and it is available in the city of Tuzla as well as in nearby municipalities in Tuzla Canton and Zenica-Doboj Canton area.

Estimated number of listeners of Radio Slon is around 213.948.

Television channels TV Slon Extra (terrestrial television in Tuzla area) and TV Slon Info (cable and online television station) are also part of company.

== Frequencies ==
- Tuzla 89.0 MHz

== See also ==
- List of radio stations in Bosnia and Herzegovina
- Radio Tuzla
- Radio Tuzlanskog Kantona
- Radio Kameleon
- Narodni radio Tuzla
- Radio TNT Tuzla
