= Radio ZOS =

Bosnian radio station

Tešanj; Bosnia and Herzegovina
- Broadcast area: Tešanj
- Frequency: Tešanj 107.0 MHz
- RDS: **ZOS**

Programming
- Language: Bosnian language
- Format: Local news, talk and music

History
- Founded: 1997

Technical information
- Licensing authority: CRA BiH
- Transmitter coordinates: 44°36′51″N 17°59′22″E
- Repeater: Tešanj/Trebačko brdo

Links
- Webcast: Listen Live
- Website: www.zosradio.ba

Radio ZOS or ZOS Radio is a Bosnian local commercial radio station, broadcasting from Tešanj, Bosnia and Herzegovina. This radio station broadcasts a variety of programs such as music and local news.

It was founded in 1997 as commercial radio station in Tešanj municipality.

Program is mainly produced in Bosnian language at one FM frequency (Tešanj 107.0 MHz) and it is available in the city of Tešanj as well as in nearby municipalities in Zenica-Doboj Canton and Tuzla Canton area.

Estimated number of listeners of Radio ZOS is around 243.252.

== Frequencies ==
- Tešanj 107.0 MHz

== See also ==
- List of radio stations in Bosnia and Herzegovina
- Antena Radio Jelah
- Radio Tešanj
- Radio Zenica
- Radio Doboj
- Radio Maglaj
