= 102.6 FM =

FM radio frequency

The following radio stations broadcast on FM frequency 102.6 MHz:

== Belgium ==
- Musiq'3 in Hainaut

== Bosnia ==
- Radio Prača in Goražde

== China ==
- CNR The Voice of China in Xiamen and Zhangzhou

== Fiji ==
- Bula FM in Suva, Nadi, Lautoka and Labasa

== France ==
- Vibration in Châteauroux

== Ireland ==
- Beat 102 103 in Gorey
- C103 in Cork City and East Cork
- Highland Radio in West Donegal
- Midlands 103 in Stradbally and Boris-in-Ossory

== India ==
- AIR FM Rainbow in Delhi and Srinagar

== Indonesia ==
- Radio Maritim Rassonia in Cirebon
- Radio Camajaya in Jakarta

== Nepal ==
- Radio Devghat in Devghat
- Samad FM in Lahan

== Netherlands ==
- Radio 538 in Overijssel and Gelderland

== Romania ==
- Radio Chișinău in Briceni

== Taiwan ==
- Transfers CNR The Voice of China in Kinmen County

== United Kingdom ==
- Heart East in Chelmsford, Braintree, Witham, Maldon and South Woodham Ferrers
- Heart West in Somerset
- Heart South in Oxfordshire
- Hits Radio North East in Alnwick
- Hits Radio Staffordshire & Cheshire in North Staffordshire and South Cheshire
- Sine FM in Doncaster, South Yorkshire
