= Super TV =

Super TV may refer to:

== Television channels ==
- Super TV (American TV channel), a 1980s subscription television service
- Super TV (Greek TV channel), a regional TV channel in Macedonia, Greece
- Super TV2, a television channel in Hungary
- Super TV (Italian TV channel), an Italian regional TV channel
- Super TV (Taiwanese TV channel, a Taiwanese TV channel

== Television services ==
- Super TV (Bosnia and Herzegovina), an IPTV provider in Bosnia and Herzegovina

== Television programs ==
- Super Junior's Super TV, a Korean variety show

== Other ==
- Super TV (magazine), a German weekly publication
