= RTM Mostar =

- Country: Bosnia and Herzegovina
- Broadcast area: Herzegovina
- Headquarters: Mostar

Programming
- Language: Bosnian language
- Picture format: 4:3 576i SDTV

Ownership
- Owner: "RTM-TV1" d.o.o. Mostar
- Key people: Narcis Selimotić

History
- Launched: 1995
- Closed: 1 August 2018
- Former names: Radiotelevizija Mostar (RTVMO)

RTV Mostar also known as RTM was a local Bosnian commercial television channel based in Mostar, Bosnia and Herzegovina. The channel was primarily broadcast in Bosnian language. The television channel was launched in 1995 and dissolved in 2018. A radio station from the same company, Radio Mostar, was founded in 1992. RTM was co-founder of the first Bosnian television network called Mreža plus.

RTM was active member and one of the founders of the new TV1Mreža

Mreža TV is a television program with almost national coverage in Bosnia and Herzegovina, and jointly in partnership with TV 1 broadcast several regional public and private TV stations.
