= TV K3 =

Televizija Kanal 3
- Country: Bosnia and Herzegovina
- Broadcast area: Banja Luka
- Affiliates: Mreža TV
- Headquarters: Prnjavor; Svetog Save br. 31

Programming
- Language: Serbian
- Picture format: 4:3 576i SDTV

Ownership
- Owner: Televizija "K3" d.o.o. Prnjavor
- Key people: Bojan Hrstić

History
- Launched: 1995
- Former names: TV K3

Links
- Website: www.tvk3.info

Availability

Terrestrial
- Yes: Prnjavor area

TV K3 or Televizija Kanal 3 is commercial television channel based in Prnjavor, Bosnia and Herzegovina. K3 TV broadcasts 24 hours of program daily, including more than 5 hours of its own production in the 10 TV shows that are created according to the wishes and interests of viewers in Republika Srpska. The program is mainly produced in Serbian.

TV K3 is also part of is part of Mreža TV. With a syndicated broadcasting programme under the Mreža TV label, TV stations have managed to cover 95 percent of the territory of Bosnia and Herzegovina. "Mreža TV" airs TV series, telenovels, movies and entertainment shows.
