= Radio Bugojno =

Bosnian radio station

Bugojno; Bosnia and Herzegovina
- Broadcast area: Central Bosnia Canton
- Frequency: Bugojno 101.0 MHz
- Branding: Public

Programming
- Language: Bosnian language
- Format: Local news, talk and music

Ownership
- Owner: JP "Radio televizija Bugojno"
- Sister stations: RTV Bugojno (Television)

History
- First air date: October 13, 1969
- Call sign meaning: RBUGOJNO

Technical information
- Transmitter coordinates: 44°03′N 17°27′E
- Repeater: Bugojno/Gladov

Links
- Webcast: On website
- Website: www.rtvbugojno.ba

Radio Bugojno is a Bosnian local public radio station, broadcasting from Bugojno, Bosnia and Herzegovina.

Radio Bugojno was launched on 13 October 1969 by the municipal council of Bugojno. As local/municipal radio station in SR Bosnia and Herzegovina, it was part of Radio Sarajevo network affiliate.

Program is mainly produced in Bosnian language. This radio station broadcasts a variety of programs such as music, local news and talk shows. Estimated number of potential listeners is around 51,129.

TV Bugojno is also part of public municipality services.

== Frequencies ==
- Bugojno 101.0 MHz

== See also ==
- List of radio stations in Bosnia and Herzegovina
