= TNT KIDS TV =

Bosnian children's TV channel

- Country: Bosnia and Herzegovina
- Broadcast area: Bosnia and Herzegovina
- Network: TNT Group
- Headquarters: Travnik; Gaj br. 18

Programming
- Language(s): Bosnian language
- Picture format: 16:9 576i (SDTV)

Ownership
- Owner: KANAL 6 d.o.o. Travnik
- Key people: Alem Lolić
- Sister channels: Kanal 6 SEVDAH TV; DREAMPORN HD

History
- Launched: 2016

Links
- Website: www.tntkids.tv

TNT KIDS TV is a specialized children's TV channel in Bosnia and Herzegovina based in the city of Travnik. It was established in 2016 by the TNT Group. The program is produced in Bosnian.

The channel's programming is targeted to children aged 6 to 12 years, and it usually consists of non-violent cartoons and educational programs.

TNT Kids TV is available via cable systems throughout the Bosnia and Herzegovina and former Yugoslavia (with sister channels from TNT Group: Kanal 6 HD, Sevdah TV, DP HD; Radio: TNT Radio Travnik, TNT Radio Tuzla and Narodni Radio Zenica).
