= NTV Jata =

- Country: Bosnia and Herzegovina
- Headquarters: Srebrenik

Programming
- Language: Bosnian language
- Picture format: 4:3 576i (SDTV)

Ownership
- Owner: Nezavisna televizija "JATA" d.o.o. Srebrenik

Links
- Website: www.tvjata.com

Availability

Streaming media
- Player on: website

NTV Jata is a Bosnian local commercial television channel based in Srebrenik, Bosnia and Herzegovina.

The program is mainly produced in Bosnian language.
