= Tatabrada =

Bosnian cable television channel

TATABRADA
- Country: Bosnia and Herzegovina
- Broadcast area: Bosnia and Herzegovina
- Network: Primat Plus
- Headquarters: Srebrenik

Programming
- Language: Bosnian language
- Picture format: 16:9 (HDTV)

Ownership
- Owner: Primat Plus d.o.o. Srebrenik
- Sister channels: (Radio) Radio Studio D

History
- Launched: 23 January 2017

Links
- Website: www.tatabrada.tv

Tatabrada TV is a Bosnian local commercial Cable television channel based in Srebrenik, BiH. The program is produced in Bosnian language, and it is available via cable systems throughout the Bosnia and Herzegovina.
