= Radio Tuzlanskog Kantona =

Bosnian radio station

Radio Tuzlanskog Kantona Radio TK
- Tuzla; Bosnia and Herzegovina
- Broadcast area: Tuzla Canton; Brčko District; Bosanska Posavina; Semberija; Podrinje
- Frequencies: Kladanj 87.9 MHz; Tuzla 90.0 MHz; Zavidovići (90.3 MHz) {{{2}}} Srebrenik 91.8 MHz; Srebrenica 99.8 MHz; Kalesija 104.4 MHz
- Branding: Public

Programming
- Language: Bosnian language
- Format: Local news, talk and music

Ownership
- Owner: JP RTV TK d.o.o. Tuzla
- Sister stations: RTV TK

History
- First air date: February 20, 1998
- Former call signs: RADIO TK

Technical information
- Transmitter coordinates: 44°32′17″N 18°40′34″E
- Repeaters: Kladanj/Bratilo; Tuzla/Ilinčica; Zavidovići/Klek; Srebrenik/Okrešanica; Srebrenica/Kvarac; Kalesija/Jajići

Links
- Webcast: On website
- Website: www.rtvtk.ba

Radio Tuzlanskog Kantona or Radio TK is a Bosnian local public radio station, broadcasting from Tuzla, Bosnia and Herzegovina. and it broadcasts a variety of programs such as news, music, morning and talk shows. Program is operated by of RTV TK and it is mainly produced in Bosnian language.

Radio Tuzlanskog Kantona was launched in 1998 as regional (Canton) public radio station in Tuzla Canton.

Estimated number of potential listeners of Radio Tuzlanskog Kantona in Tuzla Canton, Brčko District, Bosanska Posavina, Semberija and Podrinje area is around 768.629. Radio station is also available via internet and via IPTV platforms in BiH (Moja TV - Channel 200) and in America, Canada and Western European countries.

== Frequencies ==
The program of Radio TK is currently broadcast at 6 frequencies:

- Kladanj 87.9 MHz
- Tuzla 90.0 MHz
- Zavidovići (90.3 MHz) {{{2}}}
- Srebrenik 91.8 MHz
- Srebrenica 99.8 MHz
- Kalesija 104.4 MHz

== Radio TK-Studio Banovići ==
During the competition process for issuing long-term broadcasting licenses in BiH, public local radio Radio Banovići was not qualified by the Communications Regulatory Agency of Bosnia and Herzegovina, and in 2002 this radio broadcaster lost the right to broadcast radio program on the FM frequency.

In cooperation with Radio TK, local radio output Radio TK-Studio Banovići was created via ceded FM frequency which is available in the Banovići area. Estimated number of potential listeners around 19.146.

- Banovići (90.3 MHz) MHz (as Radio Banovići).

== Radio TK-Studio Srebrenica ==
Since 8 October 1982 until 1992 when war in Bosnia and Herzegovina started, Radio Srebrenica was part of local/municipal Radio Sarajevo network affiliate. During the war, with the establishment of the new national public service broadcaster RTVBiH - Radio BiH (now BHRT - BH Radio 1) radio stations from the former Radio Sarajevo 2 local network generally continued to operate as local public radio stations under the jurisdiction of local authorities in Bosnia and Herzegovina (municipalities, cantons).

In March 1992, by a political decision of the local authorities, which then consisted of the SDA and SDS, the editorial office of Radio Srebrenica was suspended. New staff prepared and broadcast the program only fifteen days after the facility and transmitter devices on the hill Bojna, near Srebrenica, were damaged by an explosive device to prevent further broadcasting of the program.

From the besieged Srebrenica in the evening hours of July 10, 1995, Nihad Nino Ćatić, a pre-war student of journalism at the Faculty of Novi Sad, made the last report from Srebrenica which was broadcast on the Radio-Television of Bosnia and Herzegovina (RTV BiH in Sarajevo).

“Srebrenica is turning into a vast slaughterhouse. The killed and wounded are being brought to the hospital continuously. It is impossible to describe it. Each second, three deadly projectiles are falling on this town. Seventeen casualties have just been brought to the hospital, as well as 57 severely and lightly wounded people. Will anyone in the world come and witness the tragedy that is befalling Srebrenica and its residents?” These were the final words to be broadcast by Nihad ‘Nino’ Ćatic, an amateur radio operator from Srebrenica. As Bosnian Serb forces surrounded the enclave, his voice was heard on the airwaves for the last time on July 10, 1995, when he did a report for Radio Bosnia and Herzegovina.

After the last war, in 1996, the local radio Radio Srebrenica starts broadcasting the program with a 100 V transmitter from the antenna pole in the Old Town. During the competition process for issuing long-term broadcasting licenses in BiH, public local Radio Srebrenica was not qualified by the Communications Regulatory Agency of Bosnia and Herzegovina, and in 2002 this radio broadcaster lost the right to broadcast radio program on the FM frequency.

In 2005, before marking the Tenth anniversary of Genocide in Srebrenica, the first activities for the renewal of the local radio are launched. In the first half of 2006, the radio signal from Srebrenica went on the air again. The program was broadcast on the frequency 99.8 MHz, which was owned by RTV TK (Radio TK) named as local radio output Radio TK-Studio Srebrenica.

On March 21, 2008, the Municipal Assembly of Srebrenica made a decision on the establishment of the public service JP Radio Televizija Srebrenica. On May 10, 2010, the "JS RTV Srebrenica" was registered. Thus, for the first time since its establishment, the radio station in Srebrenica became an independent company. Until mid-August, the radio program was broadcast on the frequency and radio waves of RTV TK.

Then, a new contract was signed and the broadcasting started on the FM frequency 105.2 MHz, whose owner is commercial radio station Radio Glas Drine from Sapna (via Radio Glas Drine - Studio Srebrenica). The program is broadcast every day, from 09.00 to 14.00 except Sunday for estimated number of potential listeners around 40.065.,

According to media reports, in 2019, the subsidy for RTV Srebrenica amounted to 146,000 km, and last year (2018) 120,000 km. Local public broadcasters in BiH are generally considered to be closely linked to the ruling political parties, which decide on their funding and the appointment of management staff.

With estimated number of potential listeners around 28.627, Radio TK (99.8 MHz) is still among the most listened stations in Srebrenica area

== See also ==
- List of radio stations in Bosnia and Herzegovina
- Radio Tuzla
- Radio TNT Tuzla
