= RTV TK =

- Country: Bosnia and Herzegovina
- Broadcast area: Tuzla Canton and Bosnian Podrinje
- Headquarters: Tuzla

Programming
- Language(s): Bosnian language
- Picture format: 16:9 1080i (HDTV)

Ownership
- Owner: Javno preduzeće "Radio-televizija Tuzlanskog kantona" d.o.o. Tuzla
- Key people: Edina Isaković

Links
- Website: www.rtvtk.ba

RTV TK or Radio Televizija Tuzlanskog kantona is a Bosnian public television channel founded by Assembly of Tuzla Canton. Local public radio station Radio TK (together with Radio TK - Studio Srebrenica, Radio TK- Studio Banovići) is also part of this company. Headquarters of RTV TK is located in the City of Tuzla. The program is mainly produced in Bosnian language.

RTV TK is the regional broadcaster (founded in 1993) that has modern equipment for broadcasting radio and television programs, as well as audio and video production. TV program is currently broadcast 24h, estimated number of viewers population is about 966.567. RTV TK is member of the Bosnian television network called TV1Mreža.

Mreža TV is a television program with almost national coverage in Bosnia and Herzegovina, and jointly in partnership with O Kanal broadcast several regional public and private TV stations. Mreža TV airs popular series, movies and sports programs to viewers in BiH.

== Current line-up ==
This television channel broadcasts a variety of programs such as news, talk shows, documentaries, sports, movies, mosaic, children's programs, etc.

- TV kalendar: Iz dana u dan - TV Calendar by RTV TK
- Vijesti (News) - broadcast at 07:05h, 12:00h and 22:30h
- Dnevnik 1 - news headlines at 16:00h
- Dnevnik 2 - news headlines at 19:00h
- Tribunal - Review of trials from International Criminal Tribunal for the former Yugoslavia
- TV Liberty - TV magazine produced by Radio Free Europe/Radio Liberty services for Bosnia and Herzegovina
- Vijesti Glasa Amerike - VOA News in the Bosnian language
- Ljeto na dlanu - afternoon mosaic program (live)
- Sport 7- sports program
- 1x2 - sports program
- Eko sat - (Eco-hour) news program
- Moj dom: savjeti (My home: tips) - shows about home decoration
- Džuboks - (Jukebox) music program
- Naše priče - (Our stories) documentary program
- Pečat u vremenu - (Stamp in time) documentary program
- TV reportaža - (TV reportage) entertaining - documentary program
- Na selu na sijelu - (Hanging in the countryside) - documentary program
- Nedjeljni kolaž - (Sunday collage) - review of cultural events
- Hod vijekova - documentary program
- TV Razglednice - (TV Postcards) documentary program
- Obojeni svijet - Children's program
- Moj mali poni - (My Little Pony: Friendship Is Magic) - cartoon program
