= Novi Radio Bihać =

Bosnian radio station

Bihać; Bosnia and Herzegovina
- Broadcast area: Una-Sana Canton
- Frequencies: Bihać 101.6 MHz; Cazin 105.8 MHz
- Branding: Private

Programming
- Language: Bosnian language
- Format: Contemporary hit radio, entertainment, talk, news

Ownership
- Owner: "NOVI RADIO" Bihać d.o.o.

History
- First air date: 2006
- Call sign meaning: NOVI R.

Technical information
- Transmitter coordinates: 44°49′N 15°52′E
- Repeaters: Bihać/Maskara 2 Cazin/Šepići-Jošani bb

Links
- Webcast: On website
- Website: www.noviradiobihac.com

Novi Radio Bihać or Novi Radio is a Bosnian local commercial radio station, broadcasting from Bihać, Bosnia and Herzegovina. Formatted as contemporary hit radio, this radio station broadcasts a variety of programs such as music, short local news and morning talk shows.

Program is mainly produced in Bosnian language and it was intended for the local audience in Bihać and Cazin area. In the rest of the country, station is available online or via IPTV platform Moja TV on channel 184.

Estimated number of potential (terrestrial) listeners is around 89,692 although it is also available in a part of the Lika-Senj County in neighboring Croatia.

== Frequencies ==
The program is currently broadcast at two frequencies:

- Bihać 101.6 MHz
- Cazin 105.8 MHz

== See also ==
- List of radio stations in Bosnia and Herzegovina
