= Radio Gradačac =

Bosnian radio station

Gradačac; Bosnia and Herzegovina
- Broadcast area: Tuzla Canton
- Frequency: 98.3 MHz

Programming
- Language: Bosnian
- Format: Local news, talk and music

Ownership
- Owner: JU Centar za kulturu "Ahmed Muradbegović" Gradačac

History
- First air date: April 6, 1965

Technical information
- Transmitter coordinates: 44°52′44″N 18°25′33″E

Links
- Website: www.radiogradacac.ba

Radio Gradačac is a Bosnian local public radio station, broadcasting from Gradačac, Bosnia and Herzegovina.

It was launched on 6 April 1965 by the municipal council of Gradačac. In Yugoslavia and in SR Bosnia and Herzegovina, it was part of local/municipal Radio Sarajevo network affiliate.

This radio station broadcasts a variety of programs such as local news, music, sport and talk shows. The programs are mainly produced in Bosnian language.

Estimated number of potential listeners of Radio Gradačac is around 138,619. The radio station is also available in municipalities of Bosanska Posavina, Zenica-Doboj Canton, Brčko District and in neighboring Croatia.

Radio Gradačac is also available via IPTV platform Moja TV on channel 290.

== Frequencies ==
- Gradačac 98.3 MHz

== See also ==
- List of radio stations in Bosnia and Herzegovina
