= TROPIK TV =

Bosnian cable television channel

- Country: Bosnia and Herzegovina
- Broadcast area: Bosnia and Herzegovina
- Headquarters: Trg Alije Izetbegovića br. 86; Zenica

Programming
- Language: Bosnian
- Picture format: 16:9 1080i (HDTV)

Ownership
- Owner: TROPIK TV d.o.o. Zenica
- Key people: Anja Galijašević

History
- Launched: 1 November 2018

TROPIK TV is a specialized children's TV channel based in Zenica, Bosnia and Herzegovina. The channel's name comes from sister company Tropik Film & Video which deals with the distribution of films, books and promotional media in Bosnia and Herzegovina.

The programming is aired in Bosnian, although the majority of series are broadcast with existing Croatian or Serbian dubs if those are available, and it is available via cable systems throughout Bosnia and Herzegovina.

== Programming ==
- Ben 10
- Peppa Pig
- Masha and the Bear – Maša i medo
- Miraculous: Tales of Ladybug & Cat Noir – Miraculous: Čudotvorne pustolovine Bubamare i Crnog mačka
- Sid the Science Kid - Sid: dijete naučnik
- Splash and Bubbles
- Super Wings
- My Little Pony: Friendship Is Magic – Moj Mali poni: Prijateljstvo je čarolija
