= Radio Banovići =

Bosnian radio station

Banovići; Bosnia and Herzegovina
- Broadcast area: Banovići
- Frequencies: Banovići 90.3 MHz; Banovići 792 kHz
- Branding: Public

Programming
- Language: Bosnian language
- Format: Local news, talk and music

Ownership
- Owner: JU " Centar za kulturu i informisanje" Banovići

History
- First air date: May 25, 1975

Technical information
- Transmitter coordinates: 44°24′N 18°32′E
- Repeater: Banovići/Vidova Glava

Links
- Webcast: On website
- Website: www.radiobanovici.com.ba

Radio Banovići is a Bosnian local public radio station, broadcasting from Banovići, Bosnia and Herzegovina.

Radio Banovići was launched on 25 May 1975 by the municipal council of Banovići. As local/municipal radio station in SR Bosnia and Herzegovina, it was part of Radio Sarajevo network affiliate.

Program is mainly produced in Bosnian language. This radio station broadcasts a variety of programs such as music, local news and talk shows. Estimated number of potential listeners is around 19,146.

== Frequencies ==
- Banovići 90.3 MHz
- Banovići 792 kHz

== See also ==
- List of radio stations in Bosnia and Herzegovina
