= RTV Zenica =

Public radio and television service in Bosnia and Herzegovina

- Radio and Television logo
- Country: Bosnia and Herzegovina
- Broadcast area: Zenica-Doboj Canton
- Headquarters: Zenica

Programming
- Language(s): Bosnian language
- Picture format: 16:9 1080i (HDTV)

Ownership
- Owner: Javno preduzeće "Radio televizija Zenica" d.o.o. Zenica
- Key people: Dženana Sivac

History
- Launched: 20 June 1969 (as Radio Zenica) 23 May 1995 (founded as RTV Zenica) 25 November 1995 (TV channel TV Zenica)

Links
- Website: www.rtvze.ba

Availability

Terrestrial
- Zenica, Orahovica, Puhovac: Channel 41 UHF
- Nemila: Channel 31 UHF

Streaming media
- Live Stream: TV | radio

RTV Zenica (RTVZE) or Radio-televizija Zenica is a Bosnian public television channel founded by Assembly of Zenica-Doboj Canton. Local public radio station Radio Zenica is also part of this company. Headquarters of RTV Zenica is located in the City of Zenica. The program is mainly produced in Bosnian language.

RTV Zenica is the regional broadcaster (founded in 1995) that has modern equipment for broadcasting radio and television programs, as well as audio and video production. TV program is currently broadcast 24h at the four frequencies, estimated number of viewers population is about 104.028. RTVZE is member of the Bosnian television network called TV1Mreža.

Mreža TV is a television program with almost national coverage in Bosnia and Herzegovina, and jointly in partnership with O Kanal broadcast several regional public and private TV stations. Mreža TV airs popular series, movies and sports programs to viewers in BiH.

== Current line-up ==
This television channel broadcasts a variety of programs such as news, talk shows, documentaries, sports, movies, mosaic, children's programs, etc.

- Zenica danas (Zenica Today) – main news programme (every night at 19:00h)
- Vijesti (News) – news at 13:00h and 15:00h
- Iz dana u dan (Day by Day) – an overview of the local service information at 12:00, 14:00 and 17:00h.
- Hronika dana (Chronicle of the day) – an overview of the daily events that prepares the information desk of RTV Zenica
- Ogledalo (Mirror) – talk show (live) about communal issues, politics, education, health, social issues, workers' rights
- Zeničke priče (Zenica stories) – positive stories about people from Zenica
- Selu u pohode (Village Revisited) – stories of past and present, about the life, culture, customs and traditions of people from the countryside.
- Sfera (Sphere) – weekly review of current cultural events in the zenica-Doboj Canton
- Popodne s vama (Afternoon With You) – afternoon mosaic program
- Odlikaši – Children's school program
- ZE sport – TV chronicle dedicated to local sports news
- Auto shop magazin – TV show dedicated to news from the auto industry
- Nije teško biti ja (It Is Not Hard to Be Me) – entertainment/interview program hosted by Živojin Krstić
- TV Liberty – TV magazine produced by Radio Free Europe/Radio Liberty services for Bosnia and Herzegovina
- Vijesti Glasa Amerike – VOA News in the Bosnian language
- Sport Nedjeljom (Sport on Sundays) – Croatian sport magazine
