= Radio Prača =

Bosnian radio station

Pale-Prača; Bosnia and Herzegovina
- Broadcast area: Bosnian Podrinje Canton Goražde
- Frequencies: Pale-Prača 93.1 MHz; Goražde 102.6 MHz
- Branding: Public

Programming
- Language: Bosnian language
- Format: Local news, talk and music

Ownership
- Owner: JP "Kulturno informativni centar" d.o.o. Prača

History
- First air date: November 1997
- Call sign meaning: *PRACA*

Technical information
- Transmitter coordinates: 43°45′50″N 18°45′50″E
- Repeaters: Prača/Cerice; Goražde/Uhotića brdo

Links
- Webcast: On website
- Website: www.radiopraca.ba

Radio Prača is a Bosnian regional public radio station, broadcasting from Pale-Prača, Bosnia and Herzegovina.

Radio Prača was launched in November 1997 by the municipal council of Pale-Prača from Bosnian Podrinje Canton. This radio station broadcasts a variety of programs such as music, sport, local news and talk shows. Program is mainly produced in Bosnian language and it is available in municipalities of Bosnian Podrinje area.

Estimated number of potential listeners of Radio Prača is around 31,200.

Radio Prača is also available via IPTV platform Moja TV on channel 196.

== Frequencies ==
The program is currently broadcast on 2 frequencies:

- Pale-Prača 93.1 MHz
- Goražde 102.6 MHz

== See also ==
- List of radio stations in Bosnia and Herzegovina
- Radio Goražde
