= RTV Bugojno =

- Country: Bosnia and Herzegovina
- Broadcast area: Bugojno
- Headquarters: Bugojno

Programming
- Language(s): Bosnian language
- Picture format: 4:3 576i SDTV

Ownership
- Owner: JP “Radio televizija Bugojno”
- Sister channels: Radio Bugojno

History
- Launched: 1992

Links
- Website: www.rtvbugojno.ba

Availability

Terrestrial
- Bugojno: 23 UHF
- Donji Vakuf: 41 UHF

RTV Bugojno or Televizija Bugojno is a local Bosnian public television channel based in city of Bugojno. It was established as Radio televizija Bugojno in 1992 when local municipal Radio Bugojno started television broadcasting.

RTV Bugojno broadcasts a variety of programs such as local news and documentaries. Program is mainly produced in Bosnian language. The program also consists of the syndicated program content from television network called Program Plus.

Radio Bugojno is also part of public municipality services.
