= Cinema TV (Bosnia and Herzegovina) =

- Country: Bosnia and Herzegovina
- Headquarters: Sarajevo

Programming
- Language: Bosnian language
- Picture format: 4:3 576i (SDTV)

Ownership
- Owner: CINEMA TV d.o.o. Sarajevo
- Key people: Adnan Komarica

Cinema TV is a Bosnian commercial cable Pay TV television channel based in Sarajevo, Bosnia and Herzegovina. The program is mainly produced in Bosnian language and it is available via cable systems and IPTV platforms throughout the Bosnia and Herzegovina. Daily program scheme on Cinema TV consists of several movie or mini TV series.
