= Radio Usora =

Bosnian radio station

Usora; Bosnia and Herzegovina
- Broadcast area: Zenica-Doboj Canton
- Frequency: Usora 98.7 MHz
- Branding: Public

Programming
- Language: Croatian
- Format: Local news, talk and music

Ownership
- Owner: J.P. „Radio Usora“ d.o.o.

History
- First air date: June 5, 1992

Technical information
- Transmitter coordinates: 44°41′59″N 18°02′52″E
- Repeater: Tešanj/Trebačko brdo

Links
- Website: www.radiousora.info

Radio Usora is a Bosnian local public radio station, broadcasting from Usora, Bosnia and Herzegovina.

It was launched on 5 June 1992 as Radio postaja Usora.

Since August 1, 2002, radio station has been registered as a public company J.P. „Radio Usora“ d.o.o. under the current name Radio Usora.

This radio station broadcasts a variety of programs such as music, talk shows and local news. Program is mainly produced in Croatian. Estimated number of potential listeners of Radio Usora is around 168.815

The radio station is available in municipalities of Zenica-Doboj Canton and via IPTV platform Moja TV (Channel 185).

== Frequencies ==
The program is currently broadcast at one frequency.

- Usora 98.7 MHz

== See also ==
- List of radio stations in Bosnia and Herzegovina
- Radio Zenica
- Radio Doboj
