= Antena Radio Jelah =

Bosnian radio station

Tešanj; Bosnia and Herzegovina
- Broadcast area: Tešanj
- Frequency: Tešanj 88.7 MHz
- RDS: *ANTENA*
- Branding: Commercial

Programming
- Language: Bosnian language
- Format: Local news, talk and music

History
- Founded: December 8, 1998

Technical information
- Licensing authority: CRA BiH
- Transmitter coordinates: 44°36′51″N 17°59′22″E
- Repeater: Tešanj/Trebačko brdo

Links
- Webcast: Listen Live
- Website: www.antena-radio.ba www.ant.ba

Antena Radio Jelah or Antena Radio Tešanj is a Bosnian local commercial radio station, broadcasting from Jelah-Tešanj, Bosnia and Herzegovina. This radio station broadcasts a variety of programs such music and local news.

It was founded on 8 December 1998 as the first private radio station in Tešanj municipality by the company Antena d.o.o. Tešanj.

Program is mainly produced in Bosnian language at one FM frequency (Tešanj 88.7 MHz) and it is available in the city of Tešanj as well as in nearby (northern) municipalities in Zenica-Doboj Canton area.

Estimated number of listeners of Antena Radio Jelah is around 153.551.

== Frequencies ==
- Tešanj 88.7 MHz

== See also ==
- List of radio stations in Bosnia and Herzegovina
- Antena Sarajevo
- Radio Zenica
- Radio Tešanj
- Radio Doboj
- Radio Usora
