= Radio Tešanj =

Bosnian radio station

- Tešanj; Bosnia and Herzegovina
- Broadcast area: Tešanj
- Frequency: Tešanj 92.2 MHz
- RDS: R-TESANJ

Programming
- Language: Bosnian language
- Format: Local news, talk and music

History
- First air date: January 1, 1969; March 2000

Technical information
- Licensing authority: CRA BiH
- Transmitter coordinates: 44°36′51″N 17°59′22″E
- Repeater: Tešanj/Trebačko brdo

Links
- Webcast: Listen Live
- Website: www.radiotesanj.ba

Radio Tešanj is a Bosnian local commercial radio station, broadcasting from Tešanj, Bosnia and Herzegovina. This radio station broadcasts a variety of programs such as music and local news.

== History ==
It was founded on 1 January 1969 as local/municipal Radio Sarajevo network affiliate from 1969 until 1992 when the war in Bosnia and Herzegovina started. During the war, with the establishment of the new national public service broadcaster RTVBiH - Radio BiH (now BHRT - BH Radio 1) radio stations from the former Radio Sarajevo 2 local network generally continued to operate as local public radio stations under the jurisdiction of local authorities in Bosnia and Herzegovina (municipalities, cantons).

In March 2000, Radio Tešanj was re-registered in Communications Regulatory Agency of Bosnia and Herzegovina as private, commercial radio station.

Program is mainly produced in Bosnian language at one FM frequency (Tešanj 92.2 MHz) and it is available in the city of Tešanj as well as in nearby municipalities in Zenica-Doboj Canton area.

Estimated number of listeners of Radio Tešanj is around 122.459.

== Frequencies ==
- Tešanj 92.2 MHz

== See also ==
- List of radio stations in Bosnia and Herzegovina
- Antena Radio Jelah
- Radio Zos
- Radio Zenica
- Radio Tuzla
- Radio Visoko
