= Televizija 5 =

Televizija 5 HD
- Country: Bosnia and Herzegovina
- Headquarters: Sarajevo

Programming
- Language: Bosnian language
- Picture format: 16:9 1080i (HDTV)

Ownership
- Owner: BalkanMedia d.o.o. Sarajevo

History
- Launched: 2016.

Links
- Website: www.televizija5.ba

Televizija 5 or TV 5 HD is Bosnian local cable commercial television channel based in Sarajevo. TV station was established in 2016 and it broadcasts religious and educational program. Program is mainly produced in the Bosnian language in high definition.
