= Radio BIR =

- Sarajevo; Bosnia and Herzegovina
- Broadcast area: Bosnia and Herzegovina
- Frequencies: Sarajevo 96.5 MHz; Bužim 98.7 MHz; Stolac 88.7 MHz; Tuzla 95.4 MHz; Zenica 87.7 MHz; Fojnica 90.7 MHz; Foča 101.7 MHz; Višegrad 102.3 MHz

Programming
- Language: Bosnian language
- Format: Islamic radio Community radio

Ownership
- Owner: Islamic Community of BiH; Radio-televizija Islamske zajednice "BIR" d.o.o. Sarajevo

History
- First air date: 11 February 2008
- Call sign meaning: RADIO BIR

Technical information
- Transmitter coordinates: 43°52′N 18°25′E

Links
- Website: www.bir.ba www.rijaset.ba

Radio BIR is a Bosnian commercial Islamic radio station, broadcasting from Sarajevo. The station focuses on Islamic religious program (e.g. Reading of the Quran), traditional Bosnian Sevdalinka songs and short national news. The program is also available via the Internet at official website www.bir.ba.

== History and programming ==
Radio BIR started with broadcasting on 11 February 2008. It has been created first and foremost in order to transmit the Islamic Prayer Programme for the Bosnian Islamic Community.

Since 2015, the headquarters of Radio and Television of the Islamic Community of Bosnia and Herzegovina - BIR is located in the building of the Gazi Husrev-bey's Library in Sarajevo (Gazi Husrev-begova 56A).

Radio BIR through quality educational and educational, cultural and informative political content strives to be the leading media in the public interest that respects and promotes the values of Islam.

The program is currently broadcast on 21 frequencies:

- Sarajevo 96.5 MHz
- Bužim 98.7 MHz
- Bihać 99.1 MHz
- Sanski Most 102.2 MHz
- Kotor Varoš 91.6 MHz
- Tuzla 95.4 MHz
- Srebrenik 95.4 MHz
- Zenica 87.7 MHz
- Zavidovići 103.8 MHz
- Doboj 90.1 MHz
- Fojnica 90.7 MHz
- Travnik 90.7 MHz
- Bugojno 100.1 MHz
- Foča 101.7 MHz
- Konjic 94.2 MHz
- Mostar 100.9 MHz
- Stolac 88.7 MHz
- Bratunac 99.3 MHz
- Goražde 95.9 MHz
- Višegrad 95.9 MHz
- Banja Luka 100.4 MHz

== See also ==
- List of radio stations in Bosnia and Herzegovina
