= Sevdah TV =

Bosnian television channel

- Country: Bosnia and Herzegovina
- Broadcast area: Bosnia and Herzegovina
- Network: TNT Group
- Headquarters: Travnik; Gaj br. 18

Programming
- Language(s): Bosnian language
- Picture format: 16:9 1080i (HDTV)

Ownership
- Owner: KANAL 6 d.o.o. Travnik
- Key people: Alem Lolić
- Sister channels: Kanal 6 TNT KIDS TV; DREAMPORN HD

History
- Launched: 2015

Links
- Website: www.sevdah.tv

Sevdah TV is specialized music television channel from Bosnia and Herzegovina dedicated to sevdah and traditional sevdalinka songs. Cable television channel is based in city of Travnik and it was established in 2015 by TNT Group. The program is produced in Bosnian language.

Sevdah TV is available via cable and IPTV systems throughout the Bosnia and Herzegovina and former Yugoslavia (with sister channels from TNT Group: Kanal 6 HD, TNT KIDS TV, DP HD; Radio: TNT Radio Travnik, TNT Radio Tuzla and Narodni Radio Zenica).

== See also ==
- Music of Bosnia and Herzegovina
- Hayat Folk
