= HTV Oscar C =

- Country: Bosnia and Herzegovina
- Headquarters: Mostar

Programming
- Language(s): Croatian
- Picture format: 4:3 576i SDTV

Ownership
- Owner: "Radiotelevizija Herceg-Bosne" d.o.o. Mostar
- Key people: Ante Krišto

History
- Launched: 1994

HTV Oscar C is a Bosnian-Herzegovinian local commercial television channel based in Mostar, Bosnia and Herzegovina. The program is mainly produced in Croatian. Cable television channel HTV Oscar 2 and the local radio station Radio Oscar C are also part of this company.
