= NTV 101 =

- Country: Bosnia and Herzegovina
- Headquarters: Sanski Most

Programming
- Language: Bosnian or Croatian language
- Picture format: 4:3 576i (SDTV)

Ownership
- Owner: "TELEVIZIJA 101" d.o.o. Prijedor
- Key people: Rezak Hukanović

History
- Launched: 1998

Links
- Website: www.ntv101.tv

Availability

Terrestrial
- Terrestrial signal: Sanski Most area

Streaming media
- NTV 101 Player: Available at website

NTV 101 is a Bosnian commercial television channel based in Sanski Most. The program is mainly produced in Bosnian language.
