= Alternativna TV =

Bosnian television company

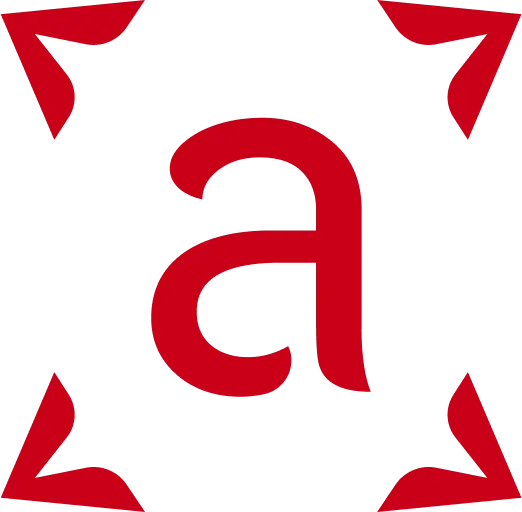
- Founded: 1997
- Headquarters: Banja Luka, Bosnia and Herzegovina
- Key people: Srđan Kevac
- Website: www.atvbl.rs

Alternativna TV (ATV; Serbian Cyrillic: Алтернативна ТВ, АТВ) is a television company based in Banja Luka, Republic of Srpska, Bosnia and Herzegovina.

This TV station also has web-based news reporting, and its news portal is among the most visited websites in Bosnia and Herzegovina.

== History ==
Alternativna TV started work in September 1996 as a correspondent unit of the first multi-entity TV network OBN. In June 1997, Alternativna TV was registered as a media company at the Ministry of Information of the Republika Srpska, and in 2001 it became a member of the now dissolved Mreža plus network. Alternativna TV broadcasts programmes from its own studios.

== U.S. sanctions ==
On 5 January 2022, the U.S. Department of the Treasury's Office of Foreign Assets Control imposed sanctions on ATV pursuant to Executive Order 14033, for being closely linked to Milorad Dodik. Dodik, who was also designated on the same day, was accused of exerting "personal control over ATV behind the scenes, such as by requiring personal approval on media stories related to politically sensitive topics. Dodik acquired ATV to deliberately and expressly further his own agenda, which includes his efforts to denigrate other political figures, burnish his public image, and advance his own personal and political goals." Dodik was also accused of awarding "ATV-related contracts directly to members of his family, which he has used as yet another avenue for corruption. He has funneled money directly from public companies to ATV for corrupt purposes. Dodik has substantially increased funding for ATV in recent years and engaged in malign social media influence campaigns through ATV to publish content that advances his political and personal goals."

Following U.S. sanctions YouTube blocked its account. The channel nominally changed ownership multiple times to circumvent sanctions.

The sanctions were removed on October 29, 2025.
