= TV Slon Extra =

- Country: Bosnia and Herzegovina
- Headquarters: Tuzla

Programming
- Language(s): Bosnian language
- Picture format: 16:9 1080i (HDTV)

Ownership
- Owner: "Vidik" d.o.o. za posredništvo, informativnu i trgovinsku djelatnost Tuzla
- Key people: Šaban Pirić

Links
- Website: www.rtvslon.ba

TV Slon Extra is a Bosnian local commercial television channel based in Tuzla. The program is broadcast every day from 16 to 23 hours via cable networks and it is mainly produced in Bosnian language.
