= Religion in Bosnia and Herzegovina =

Religion in Bosnia and Herzegovina (2013 census)
1. Islam (Note: This includes the "Islamska" and "Muslimanski" categories of the census) (51.3%)
2. Eastern Orthodoxy (30.7%)
3. Catholicism (Note: This includes the "Katolička" and "Rimokatolička" categories of the census) (15.4%)
4. No religion / Others (2.60%)

The most widely professed religion in Bosnia and Herzegovina is Islam and the second largest religion is Christianity. Nearly all the Muslims of Bosnia are followers of the Sunni denomination of Islam; the majority of Sunnis follow the Hanafi legal school of thought (fiqh) and Maturidi theological school of thought (kalām). Bosniaks are generally associated with Islam, Croats of Bosnia and Herzegovina with Catholicism, and Bosnian Serbs with Eastern Orthodoxy. The State Constitution of Bosnia and Herzegovina (BiH) and the entity Constitutions of the Federation of Bosnia and Herzegovina and the Republika Srpska provide for freedom of religion, and the Government generally respects this right in ethnically integrated areas or in areas where government officials are of the majority religion; the state-level Law on Religious Freedom also provides comprehensive rights to religious communities. However, local authorities sometimes restricted the right to worship of adherents of religious groups in areas where such persons are in the minority.

Government protection of religious freedom declined, especially during the campaign period prior to the October 2006 national elections, due to selective legal enforcement and the indifference of some government officials. At the end of the period covered by this report, the Government was implementing the State Law on Religious Freedom to protect the rights of religious communities and create a government registry allowing them to establish legal status.

Religion in Bosnia and Herzegovina (Pew Research)(2020)
1. Islam (53.6%)
2. Christianity (44.7%)
3. Unaffiliated (1.10%)
4. Other religions (0.70%)

Societal abuses and discrimination based on religious belief and practice persisted. Religious intolerance directly reflected ethnic intolerance because of the virtually indistinguishable identification of ethnicity with religious background. Discrimination against religious minorities occurred in nearly all parts of the country. In some communities, local religious leaders and politicians contributed to intolerance and an increase in nationalism through public statements and sermons. A number of illegally constructed religious objects continued to cause ethnic/religious tension and conflict in various communities. Religious symbols were often misused for political purposes.

In a 2009 Gallup poll, 77% of respondents in Bosnia and Herzegovina answered 'yes' to the question "Is religion an important part of your daily life?", while 21% responded negatively. According to a 2015 Pew Research poll, 31% of Bosnian Muslims, 10% of Orthodox Christians and 54% of Catholic Christians reported attending religious services once a week or more than once a week.

== Demographics ==
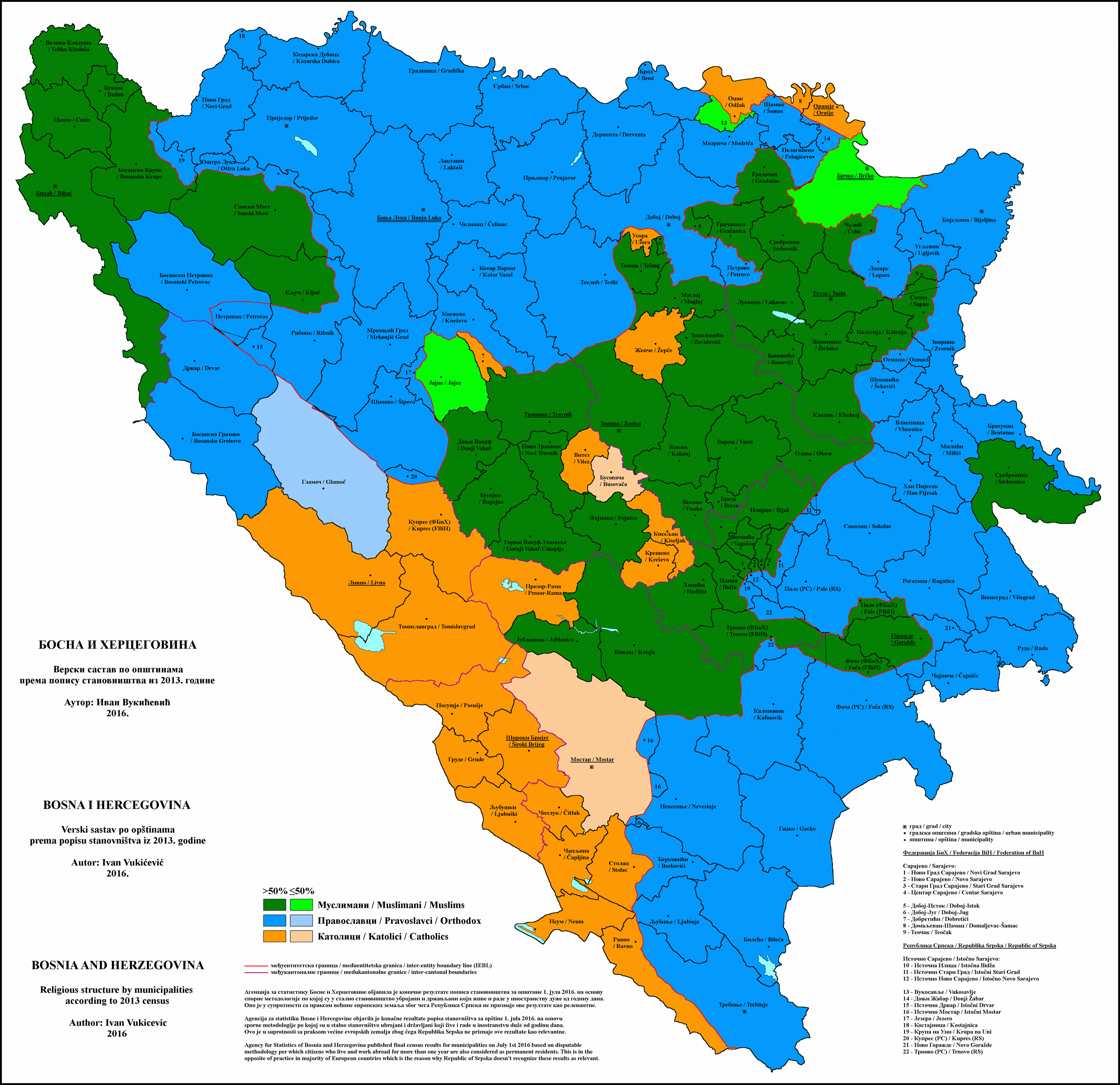
Religious map by municipality according to the 2013 census. Bosnian Muslims Serbian Orthodox Christians Croatian Catholic Christians

According to the most recent census, conducted in 2013 and whose results were published in 2016, Muslims today constitute 51.33% of the population; traditional Christians (Catholic and Orthodox), constitute 45.94%; and other groups, including Protestants, Jews and nonreligious persons, constitute 3.36%, although these figures are often disputed by Bosnia's Serb community. In 2022, the Jewish community had fewer than 900 believers. Most of them being Sephardic Jews.

The rate of religious observance is relatively low among the traditional religious groups; however, some areas of significantly greater observance exist, such as among Catholic Croats in the Herzegovina region and among Bosnian Muslims in central Bosnia. For many Bosnian Muslims, religion often serves as a community or ethnic identifier, and religious practice is confined to occasional visits to the mosque or significant rites of passage such as birth, marriage, and death. Nevertheless, religious leaders from the Muslim, Catholic, and Orthodox communities claimed that all forms of observance were increasing among young persons as an expression of increased identification with their ethnic heritage, in large part due to the national religious revival that occurred as a result of the 1992–95 Bosnian war. Younger believers who grew up in the post-communist period also have more freedom to practice their religion and more access to religious education. Leaders from the three largest religious communities observed that they enjoyed greater support from their believers in rural areas of Bosnia than from those in urban centers such as Sarajevo or Banja Luka.

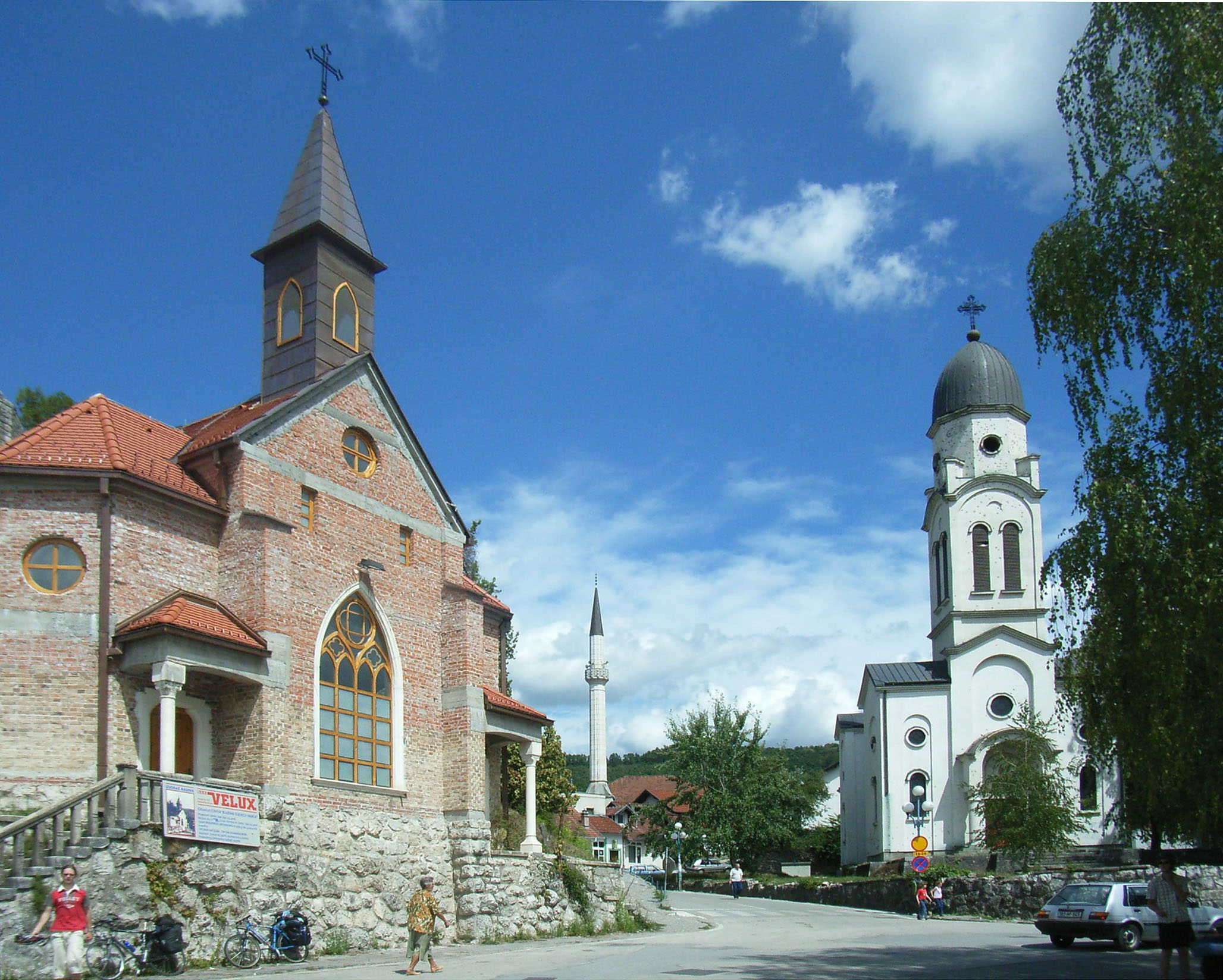
Religious pluralism: Catholic church (left), Serbian Orthodox church (right), and a mosque (center background) in Bosanska Krupa.

Ethnic cleansing during the 1992–95 war caused internal migration and refugee flows, which segregated the population into separate ethnoreligious areas. Increased levels of returns, which peaked in 2002, continued to slow significantly, leaving the majority of Serbian Orthodox adherents living in the RS and the majority of Muslims and Catholics in the Federation. Within the Federation, distinct Muslim and Catholic majority areas remain. However, returns of Serbian Orthodox adherents and Muslims in recent years to their prewar homes in western Bosnia and Muslims to their prewar homes in eastern Bosnia have shifted the ethnoreligious composition in both areas. For example, the prewar population of the eastern RS town of Bratunac was 64% Bosniak. In 1995 the population was almost completely Serb; in 2007, after the return of 6,500 Bosniaks, the population was 38% Bosniak. Similarly, in Prijedor Municipality in the RS, approximately half of the prewar Bosniak population of 49,500 returned, partially reversing the effects of ethnic cleansing. Christians, on the other hand, seem to rarely move back to their old towns; the number of Catholics returning to central Bosnia and the RS, as well as of Serbs returning to the Federation, was negligible.

The Catholic community maintains its Bishops' Conference as an overarching organizational and regional structure, with bishops residing in Mostar, Banja Luka, and Sarajevo; the Franciscan order maintains its strongest presence in central Bosnia, in Sarajevo, and in Herzegovina. The Serbian Orthodox Church maintains its greatest influence in the RS, with the most influential bishops residing in Banja Luka, Trebinje, and Bijeljina. The Jewish community, like most other small religious groups in Bosnia, including Protestants, has its strongest membership in Sarajevo. There are several small Christian denominations throughout the country. In late 2011, a Rodnover association named Svaroži Krug, was established in the nation as a part of the panslavic Praskozorje movement.

== Majority religions ==
=== Islam ===
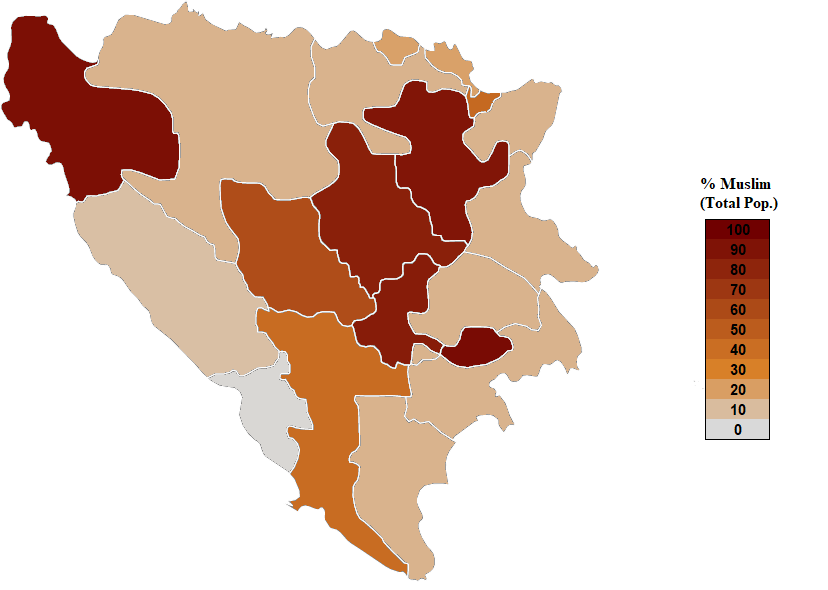
Distribution of Muslims in Bosnia and Herzegovina (2013)

Islam is the largest of the three main faiths in Bosnia and Herzegovina, making up a bit more than half of the nation's population. The first Muslims were documented in the late 14th century though Islam started spreading in the 15th century. There are eight muftis (Islamic scholars) located in the major municipalities: Sarajevo, Bihać, Travnik, Tuzla, Goražde, Zenica, Mostar, and Banja Luka. The more conservative Islamic communities in Bosnia are located in towns such as Travnik, Zavidovići, Tešanj, Maglaj, Bugojno, and Zenica. 45% of Herzegovinian and Bosnian Muslims described themselves as Sunni Muslims while 47% described themselves as just Muslims. However, 7% of Muslims either refused to answer which Muslim branch they belonged to, said they belonged to no Muslim branch or said they did not know.

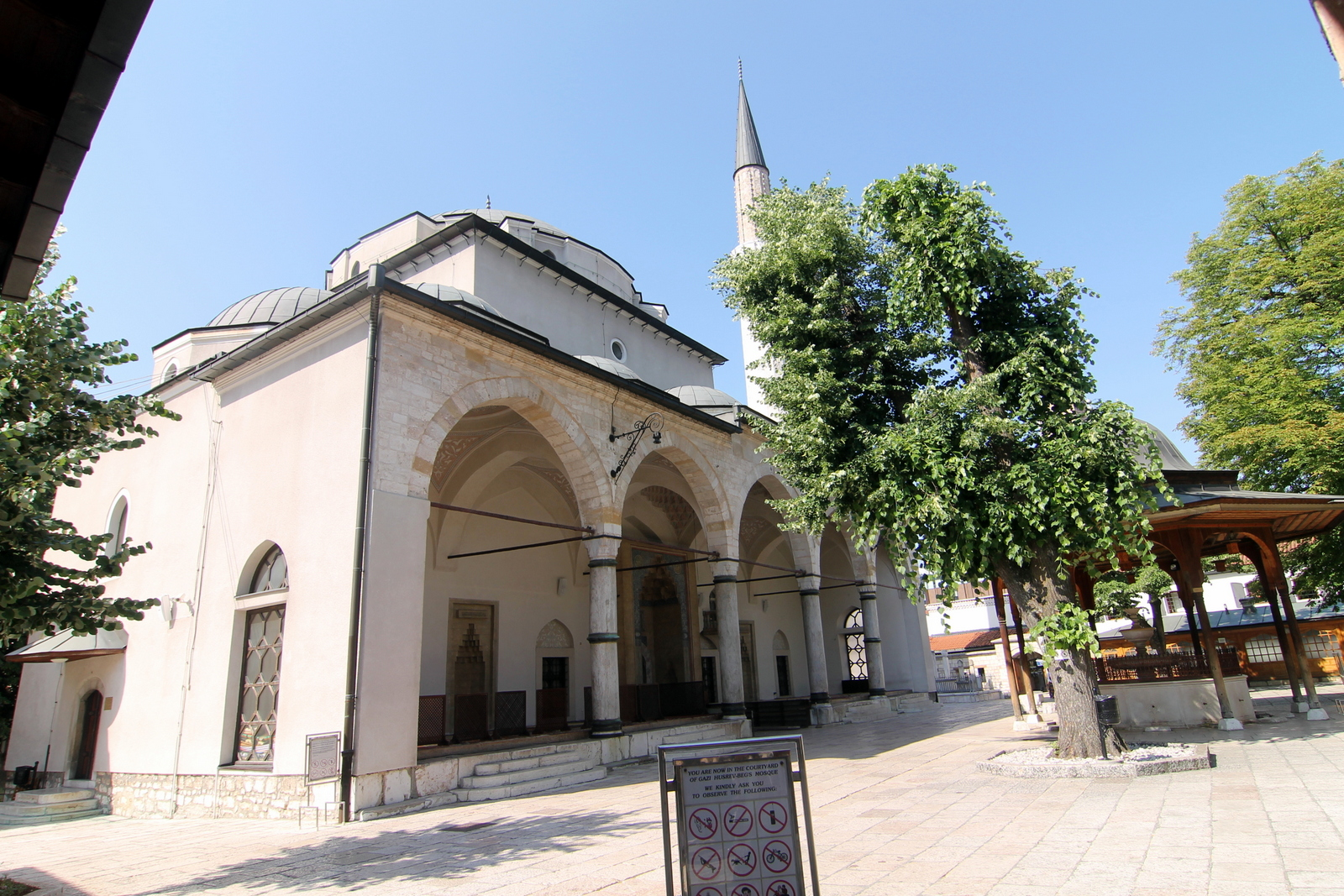
Gazi Husrev-beg Mosque in Sarajevo.

=== Christianity ===
==== Eastern Orthodoxy ====
Eastern Orthodoxy is the second largest religion in Bosnia and Herzegovina comprising almost a third of the country's population. According to the 2013 census, Eastern Orthodox Christians make up 30.7% of the country's population. It is overwhelmingly followed by the ethnic Serb population in the country, mainly living in Republika Srpska. The Serbian Orthodox Church is the sole Eastern Orthodox jurisdiction in the territory of Bosnia and Herzegovina.

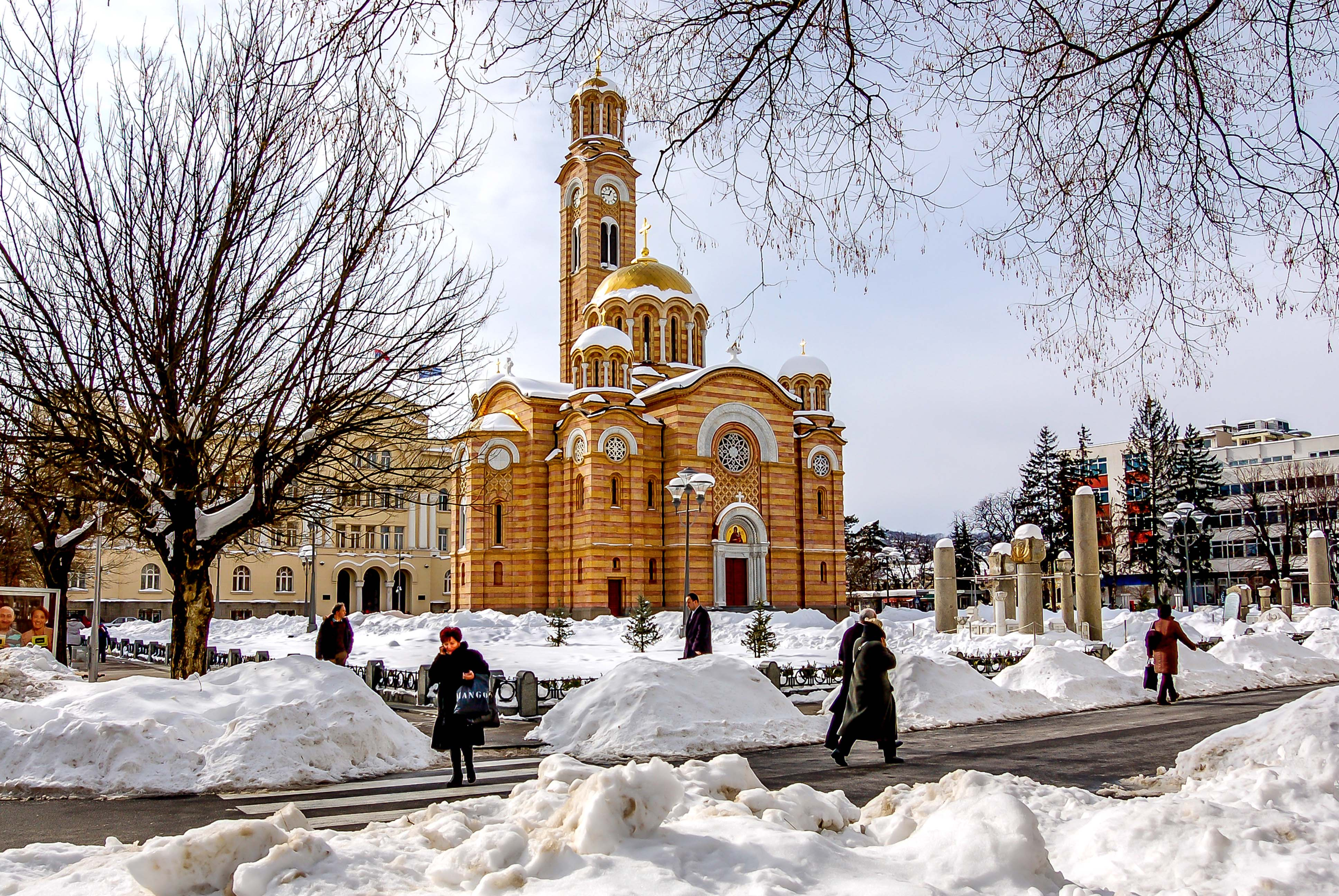
Cathedral of Christ the Saviour in Banja Luka.

==== Catholicism ====
The Catholic Church in Bosnia and Herzegovina is the third largest religion in Bosnia and Herzegovina making up around less than eighth of the nations population. Catholicism is generally followed by the Croat population which mainly lives in Western Herzegovina. The Catholic Church in Bosnia and Herzegovina is the oldest Church in Bosnia that survived. It has been present since the spread of Catholicism in Europe and has been the largest branch of Christianity up until the 12th century when the Bosnian Church became the largest religious group in Medieval Bosnia.

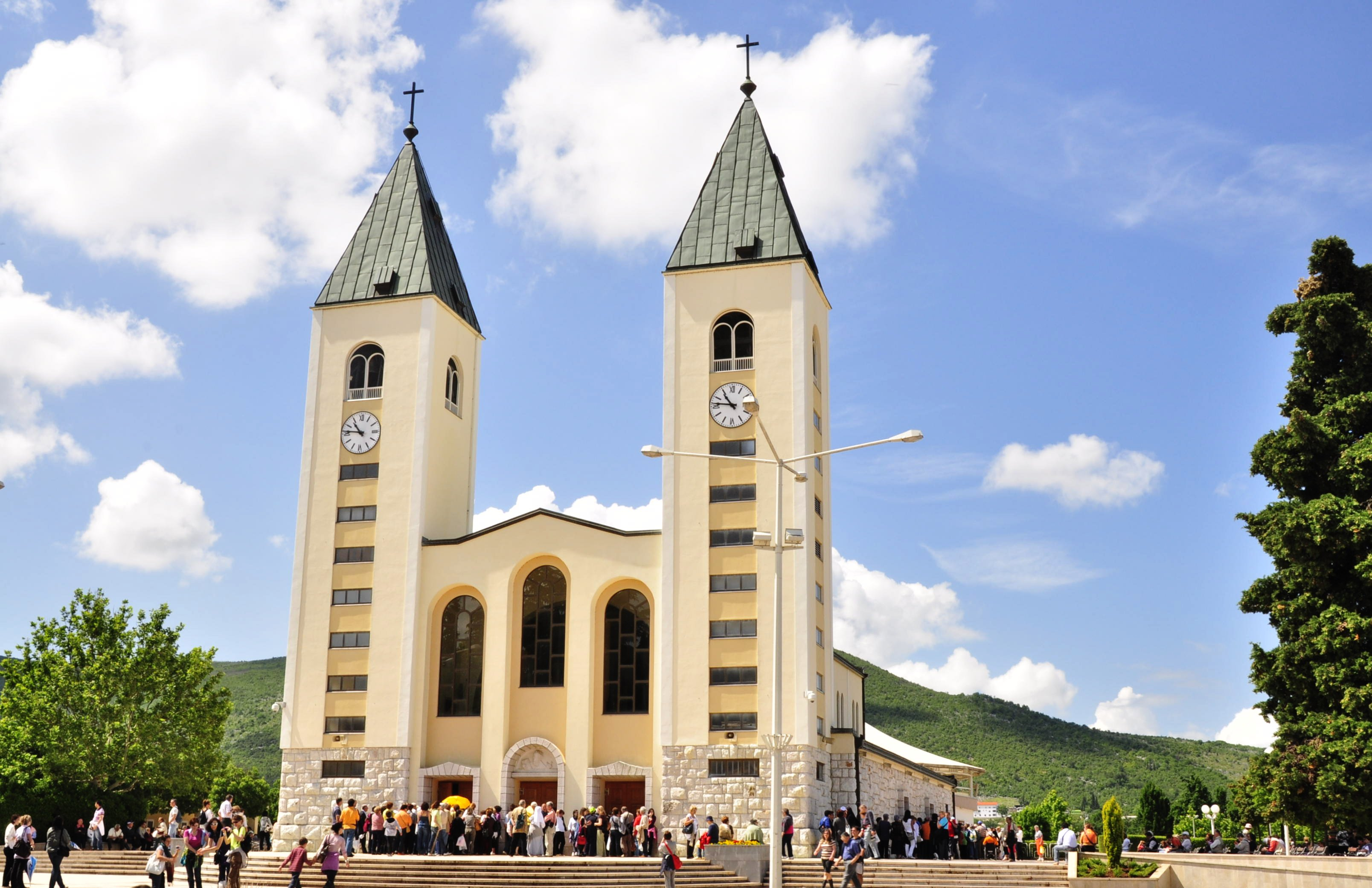
St. James church in Medjugorje.

Religion in Bosnia and Herzegovina from every population census 1871-2013 (from 1948-1981 the data in the table is from ethnic identification), the data includes a Pew Research Institute estimate from 2020 and the Church statistic of the Catholic Church in Bosnia and Herzegovina from 2023
| Year | Islam | % | Eastern Orthodoxy | % | Catholicism | % | Judaism | % | Other | % | Irreligious (Atheist and Agnostic) | % |
|---|---|---|---|---|---|---|---|---|---|---|---|---|
| 1871 | 870,128 | 49.8% | 636,208 | 36.4% | 220,353 | 12.6% | 3,669 | 0.2% | 16,041 | 0.9% | - | |
| 1879 | 448,613 ▼ | 38.73% ▼ | 496,485 | 42.88% ▲ | 209,391 | 18.08% ▲ | 3,426 | 0.29% ▲ | 249 | 0.02% | - | |
| 1885 | 492,710 ▲ | 36.88% ▼ | 571,250 ▲ | 42.76% ▼ | 265,788 ▲ | 19.89% ▲ | 5,805 ▲ | 0.43% ▲ | 538 ▲ | 0.02% | - | |
| 1895 | 548,632 ▲ | 34.99% ▼ | 673,246 ▲ | 42.94% ▲ | 334,142 ▲ | 21.31% ▲ | 8,213 ▲ | 0.52% ▲ | 3,859 ▲ | 0.24% ▲ | - | |
| 1910 | 612,137 ▲ | 32.25% ▼ | 825,418 ▲ | 43.49% ▲ | 434,061 ▲ | 22.87% ▲ | 11,868 ▲ | 0.62% ▲ | 14,560 ▲ | 0.77% ▲ | - | |
| 1921 | 588,244 ▼ | 31.07% ▼ | 829,290 ▲ | 43.87% ▲ | 444,308 ▲ | 23.58% ▲ | | | 28,595 ▲ | 1.58% ▲ | - | |
| 1931 | 718,079 ▲ | 30.9% ▼ | 1,028,139 ▲ | 44.25% ▲ | 547,949 ▲ | 23.58% ▲ | | | 29,388 ▲ | 1.27% ▼ | - | |
| 1948 | 788,403* ▲ | 30.73% ▼ | 1,136,116* ▲ | 44.29% ▲ | 614,123* ▲ | 23.94% ▲ | | | 26,635* ▼ | 1.04% ▼ | | |
| 1953 | 891,800* ▲ | 31.32% ▲ | 1,264,372* ▲ | 44.40% ▲ | 654,229* ▲ | 22.97% ▼ | | | 39,398* ▲ | 1.34% ▲ | | |
| 1961 | 842,247* ▼ | 25.69% ▼ | 1,406,053* ▲ | 42.89% ▼ | 711,660* ▲ | 21.72% ▼ | | | 42,092* ▲ | 1.28% ▼ | | |
| 1971 | 1,482,430* ▲ | 39.57% ▲ | 1,393,148* ▼ | 37.19% ▼ | 772,491 ▲ | 20.62% ▼ | | | 98,042* ▲ | 1.62% ▲ | | |
| 1981 | 1,630,033* ▲ | 39.52% ▼ | 1,320,738* ▼ | 32.02% ▼ | 758,140* ▼ | 18.38%* ▼ | 343* ▼ | <0.01% ▼ | | | | |
| 1991 | 1,871,882 ▲ | 42.8% ▲ | 1,286,828 ▲ | 29.4% ▼ | 765,993 ▲ | 17.5% ▼ | 228 ▼ | <0.01% | 201,417▲ | 4.6%▲ | 250,913 | 5.7% |
| 2013 | 1,812,522 ▼ | 51.33% ▲ | 1,085,760 ▼ | 30.75%▲ | 536,333 ▼ | 15.19% ▼ | 281 ▲ | <0.01% | 130,054 ▼ | 3.61% ▼ | 38,669 ▼ | 1.1%▼ |
| 2020 Estimate (Pew Research Center) | 1,770,000 ▼ | 53.6%▲ | 1,470,000 ▼ (Christianity) | | | 44.7%▼ | 20,000 | | | | 30,000 ▼ | 1.1% |
| 2023 | | | | | 331,266 | 9.9%▼ | | | | | | |

== Minority religions ==
=== Baháʼí Faith ===
During the interwar period between the World Wars, when Bosnia and Herzegovina became part of the Kingdom of Yugoslavia, several members of Yugoslavian royalty had contact with prominent members of the Baháʼí Faith. In July, 1938, Marie of Edinburgh, a member of the religion and Queen of Romania, died. A message of condolence was communicated, in the name of all Baháʼí communities in East and West, to her daughter, Maria, then Queen of Yugoslavia, to which she replied expressing "sincere thanks to all of Baháʼu'lláh's followers." Later Princess Olga of Yugoslavia, on being informed of the death of Hand of the Cause Martha Root in 1939, remarked “She was so kind and gentle, and a real worker for peace. I am sure she will be sadly missed in her work.”

Following the end of World War II in Yugoslavia and establishment of the Socialist Federal Republic of Yugoslavia, a nominally secular state under influence of state atheism, religions became discouraged. The first member of the Baháʼí Faith in Yugoslavia was an isolated Baháʼí in Belgrade who converted to the religion in 1963. Active plans for promoting the religion in the former Yugoslavia were designated in the Six Year Plan (which ran April 1986 to April 1992) and extended in the Two Year Plan during which the region gained several local spiritual assemblies, all under the general guidance of the Bahá'ís of Austria. The first Baháʼí Local Spiritual Assembly was formed in November 1990.

Since the Bosnian War in 1990s and the breakup of Yugoslavia, the Baháʼís had not elected a National Spiritual Assembly, but do have a small population in a few regions in the country. Separate committees in Austria were established for the region of the former Yugoslavia. During 2000 and 2001, the Bahá'í-inspired Landegg Academy Bahá'í School of Switzerland sent faculty and students to the region including Bosnia offering training in principles of peace seminars to thousands of students and parents, and hundreds of teachers, school administrators and staff in Sarajevo, Banja Luka, and Travnik. Activities increased with a burgeoning community of Baháʼís. In 2001, Baháʼí youth gathered for a dance workshop (see Oscar DeGruy) in Zenica The program from Landegg was formalized to the name Education for Peace Program and the Bosnian-Herzegovina government affirmed the program in 2002 intending to roll it out across the national school system. By 2003 Baháʼís had organized Bosnia and Herzegovina into 17 subregions, and four of these contained at least one Baháʼí and a few Ruhi Institute study circles were operating. Across 2004-5 ambassadors including from Bosnia and Herzegovina were received on official visits to the Bahá'í World Center in Haifa, Israel. The same year Bosnians participated in a Bahá'í summer school held in Croatia-Slovenia.

A presence of Bahá'ís was noted before 2010. Bahá'ís did note devotional meetings of the religion held in Sarajevo and Bihać, Bosnia. An online magazine did a short profile in 2018. The small community of Baha'is of Bosnia and Herzegovina has continued to have a presence in events beyond the confines of the country. In November 2004 membership of Baha'i inspired General Assembly of the International Environment Forum lists one member. In February 2008 the government of Bosnia and Herzegovina aligned themselves with the declaration of the President of Slovenia on behalf of the European Union on the deteriorating situation of the Baháʼís in Iran.

=== Hinduism ===
Hinduism is a minority faith in Bosnia and Herzegovina, represented mainly by the ISKCON movement. In the former Yugoslavia, the ISKCON movement has been present since the 1970s and has existed in Bosnia and Herzegovina since 1988. It was officially registered as a religious community in 2005. There is an organized community in Sarajevo and there are also members in other cities. ISKCON has about 300-500 members in the country. According to Halida Ðonlagić, ISKCON is the only Hindu tradition registered as a 'religious community' in Bosnia and Herzegovina.

== Status of religious freedom ==
=== Legal and policy framework ===
The State Constitution provides for freedom of religion; however, respect for religious freedom declined due to selective legal enforcement and indifference of some government officials, which allowed societal violence and the threat of violence to restrict the ability to worship of adherents of religious groups in areas where they are in the minority. On October 16, 2006, the Ministry of Human Rights and Refugees issued instructions for implementation of the Law on Religious Freedom, which provides for freedom of religion, ensures legal status of churches and religious communities, and prohibits any form of discrimination against any religious community. The law also provides the basis for the establishment of relations between the state and religious communities.

The State Constitution safeguards the rights of the three major ethnic groups (Bosniaks, Serbs, and Croats), and by extension the three largest religious communities, by providing proportional representation for each group in the government and in the armed forces. As a result of the governmental structure created by the Dayton Accords, parliamentary seats and most government positions are apportioned specifically to members of the three "constituent peoples." These stipulations often result in constitutional discrimination against "others" and sympathizers of certain religious communities that do not fit neatly into the three groups. During the period covered by this report, members of the Bosnian Jewish and the Romani communities filed separate lawsuits before the European Court of Human Rights to address this discrimination against those considered "others" by the State Constitution. Their claims were not addressed during the reporting period.

Bosnia's state-level government does not officially recognize any religious holy days as an official holiday, and Parliament continued to disagree on a state law on national holidays. Entity and cantonal authorities routinely recognize religious holidays celebrated by members of the area's majority religion, with government and public offices closed on those days. In May 2007 the RS Constitutional Court overruled a Vital National Interest veto by Bosniaks in the RS Council of Peoples, thus enabling the RS National Assembly to pass the Law on Holidays in the RS, which includes observance of RS Day on January 9. Locally observed holy days include Orthodox Easter and Christmas in the RS, Catholic Easter and Christmas in Herzegovina, and Kurban Bajram and Ramadan Bajram in Sarajevo and central Bosnia. On January 27, 2007, BiH officially marked Holocaust Day for the first time and commemorated the day with a series of exhibitions, lectures, and discussions throughout the country.

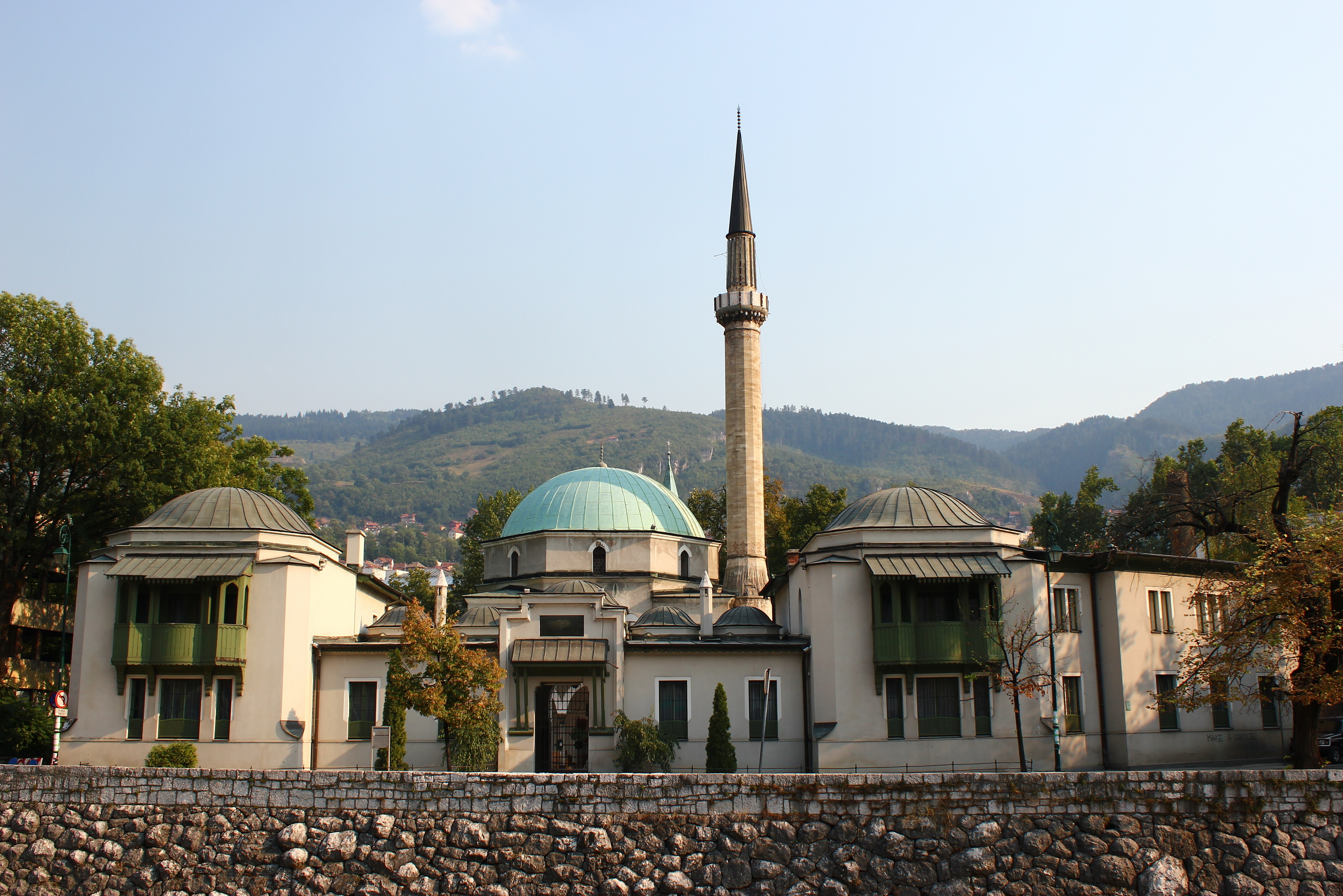
Emperor's mosque in Sarajevo

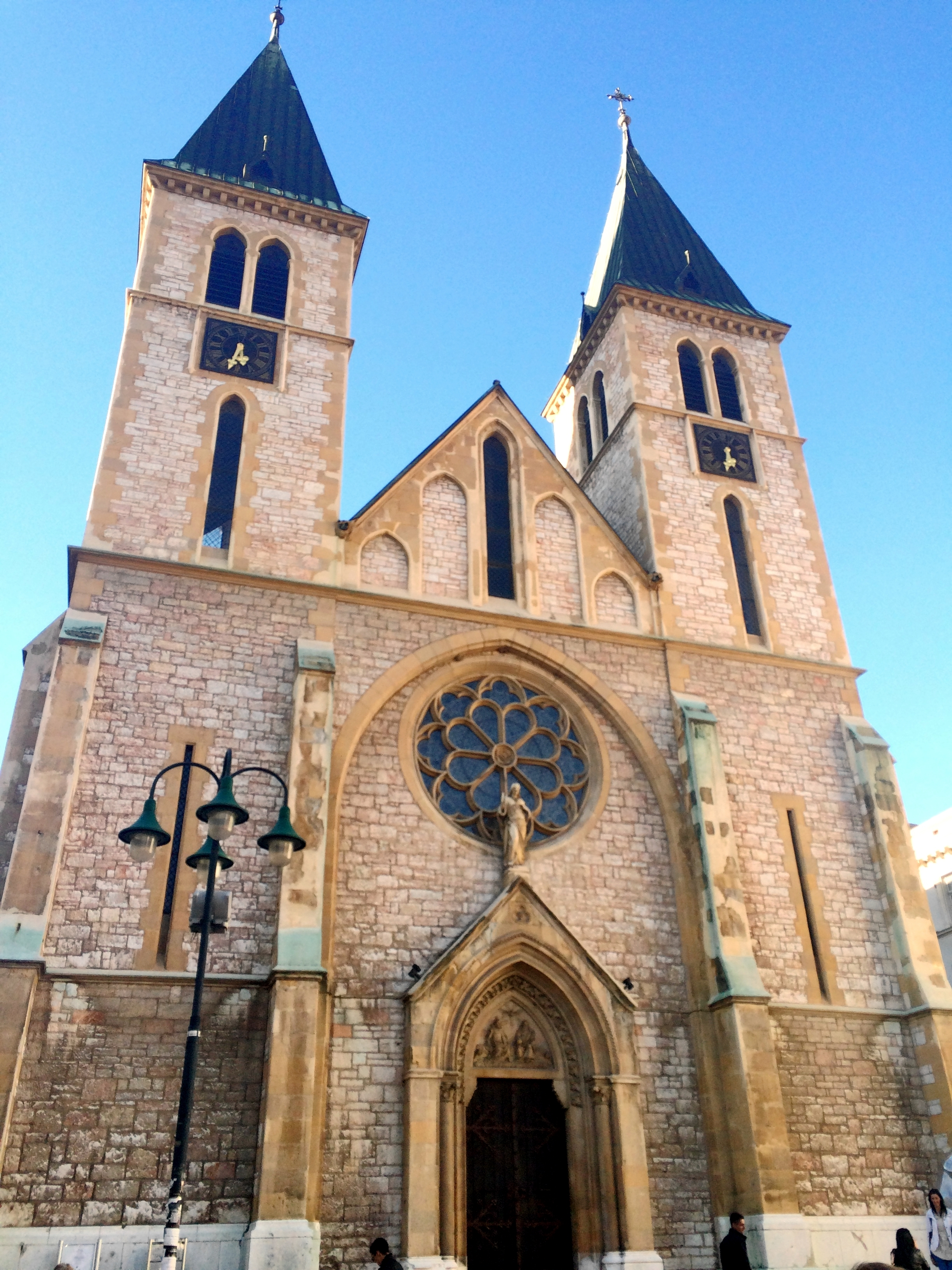
Sacred Heart Cathedral in Sarajevo

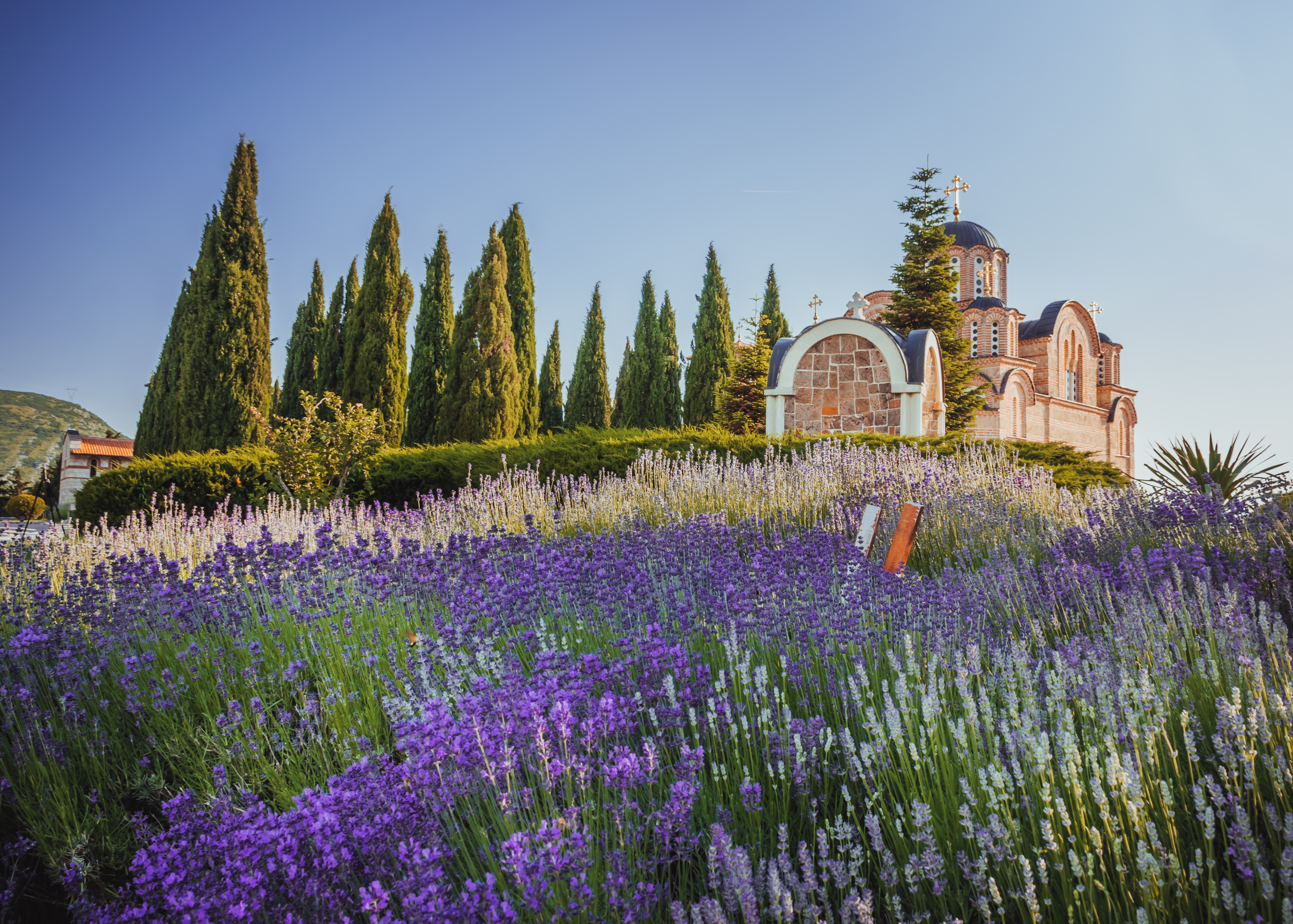
Hercegovačka Gračanica in Trebinje

The State Law on Religious Freedom governs religion and the licensing of religious groups, and it provides for the right to freedom of conscience and religion in Bosnia. It grants churches and religious communities legal status and allows them concessions that are characteristic of a nongovernmental organization (NGO). The law also creates a unified register for all religious groups within the Bosnian Ministry of Justice, while the Ministry of Human Rights and Refugees is tasked with documenting violations of religious freedom.

According to the law, any group of 300 adult citizens may apply to form a new church or religious community with a written application to the Ministry of Justice. The Ministry of Justice will issue a decision within 30 days of the application, and an appeal may be made to the Bosnian Council of Ministers. The law allows minority religious organizations to register legally and operate without unwarranted restrictions. At the end of the period covered by this report, the Alliance of Baptist Churches awaited registration confirmation.

Political parties dominated by a single ethnic group remained powerful and continued to identify closely with the religion associated with their predominant ethnic group. Many political party leaders were former communists who manipulated the core attributes of their particular ethnic group, including religion, to strengthen their credibility with voters. For example, offices of local Bosnian Serb mayors in the RS were often decorated with religious icons, although few officials practiced religion in any meaningful sense. In recent years many Bosnians have turned to their respective religious leaders to fill the void left by politicians, who are perceived by the public as apathetic or corrupt. This enabled religious leaders to play an influential political role, often promoting nationalist platforms, in the 2006 national elections and subsequent government formation as well as in political programs.

The lines dividing politics, ethnic identity, and religion were often blurred, particularly during the period prior to the 2006 national elections and during the public debate over proposed changes to the Bosnian Constitution. Some religious leaders became increasingly political and vocal in this period and used religious sermons and services for political campaign purposes. Political candidates courted religious leaders during the campaign season and were often photographed together in campaign propaganda and media reports. Religious leaders also used their position to influence the election outcome by encouraging their communities to vote for certain individuals or parties. For example, prior to the elections Bosnia's Catholic bishops issued a pastoral letter that was read in every Catholic church on July 2, 2006, in place of the traditional Sunday sermon. The letter reminded believers of the importance of their vote and encouraged Croat parties to form coalitions so that no Croat vote would be wasted. It also urged them to oppose U.S.-brokered constitutional amendments "through which war horrors would be legalized and the Croat people marginalized." During the preelection period, the media and others often criticized the head of the BiH Islamic community for his appearance at public events with presidential candidate Haris Silajdzic and for his public statements calling on Silajdzic to "write a new constitution" so Bosniaks would honor him as they do wartime president Alija Izetbegovic.

The State Law on Religious Freedom reaffirms the right of every citizen to religious education. The law calls for an official representative of the various churches or religious communities to be responsible for teaching religious studies in all public and private preschools, primary schools, and universities throughout Bosnia. These individuals are employees of the municipality in which they teach but have been accredited by the religious body governing the curriculum. However, the law was not always fully implemented, particularly in segregated school systems or where there was political resistance from nationalist party officials at the municipal level. During the period covered by this report, the entity, cantonal, and municipal governments gave varying levels of financial support to the four traditional religious communities - Muslim, Serbian Orthodox, Catholic, and Jewish. Religious communities tended to receive the most funding in areas where their adherents were in the majority. Religious education is largely decentralized, as is the education system generally. Public schools offer religious education classes, but with some exceptions, schools generally offer religious instruction only in the municipality's majority religion. By law, students (or their parents, in the case of primary school students) may choose not to attend the classes. However, students of the majority religion and sometimes also of minority religious groups faced pressure from teachers and peers to attend religious instruction, and most did so. Children who are reluctant to be singled out as different from their classmates often attend instruction of the majority religion, even if it is not the religion they practice at home. If a sufficient number of students of minority religious group(s) attend a particular school (20 in the RS, 15 in the Federation), the school must organize religion classes on their behalf. However, in rural areas there are usually no qualified religious representatives available to teach religious studies to the handful of minority students. Minority students are often widely scattered across remote areas, making it logistically difficult to provide classes even when a teacher is available. In the Federation's five cantons with Bosniak majorities, schools offer Islamic religious instruction as a 2-hour-per-week elective course. In cantons with Croat majorities, all Croat students attend the "elective" 1-hour weekly Catholic religion course for primary and middle schools. Use of religious symbolism by the majority group in art classes, such as minority children in Bosniak majority areas being tasked to draw mosques or those in Christian majority areas being asked to draw crosses, continued to be a problem. Parents may enroll their children in private schools for religious reasons. In Sarajevo, Tuzla, Travnik, Visoko, Mostar, and Bihać, Muslim students may attend madrassahs. These Islamic secondary schools provide training for students who want to become religious officials as well as general education to prepare students for university studies. There is one Serbian Orthodox secondary school in Foca. In Sarajevo, Tuzla, Travnik, Zepce, Banja Luka, Bihac, and Zenica, students may attend Catholic school centers. Although primarily Croat, these schools are open to students of other ethnicities and religious groups. Some of these centers have both primary and secondary schools, and although the principals are priests, the majority of teachers are not religious officials. The curriculum is a combination of Bosniak and Croat curricula used in the Federation.

Facilities also exist for the three largest religious communities at the university level. The Faculty of Islamic Sciences is located in Sarajevo, the Serbian Orthodox Seminary in Foča in the RS, and two Catholic theology faculties (one run by the Franciscans and one run by the diocese) in Sarajevo.

=== Restrictions on religious freedom ===
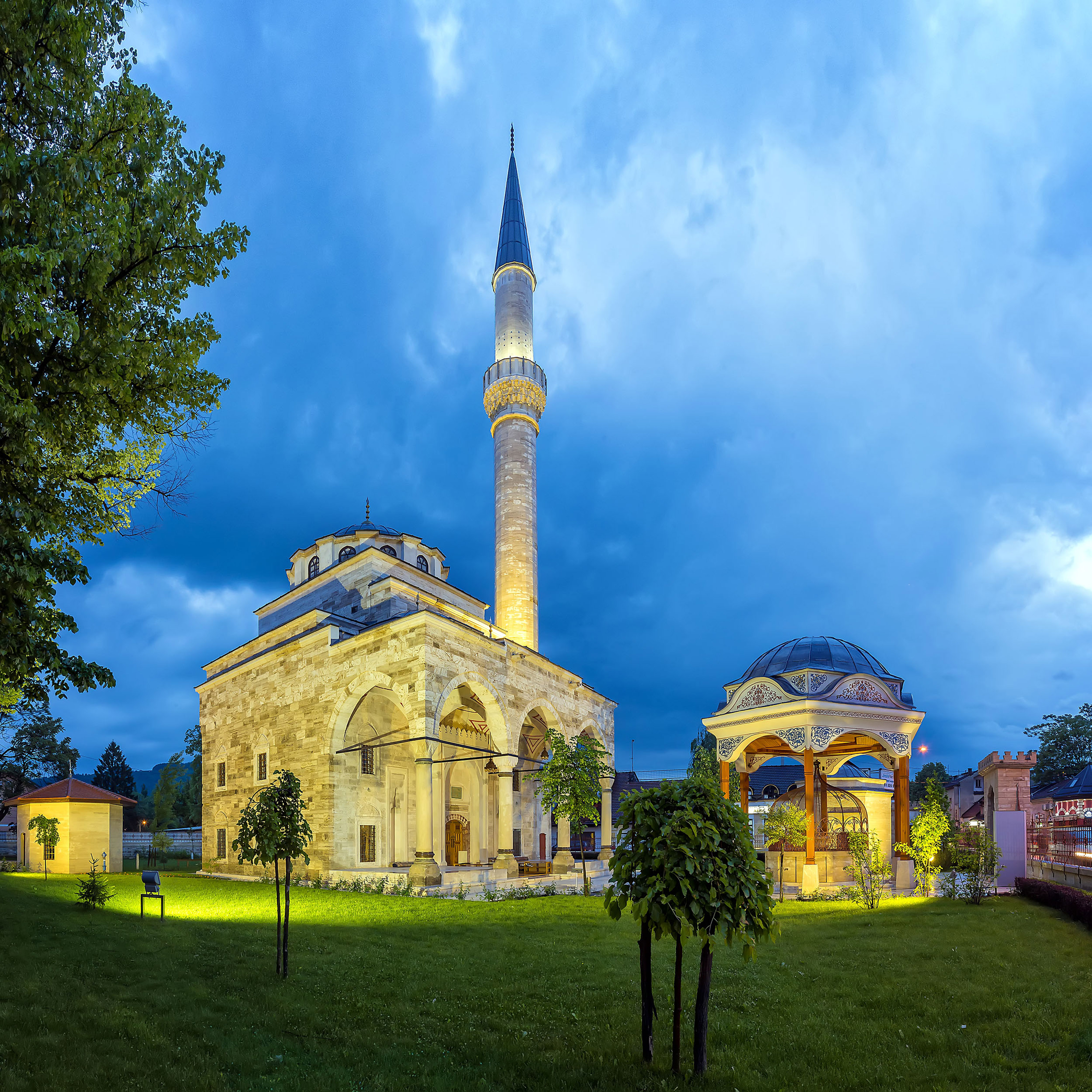
Ferhat Pasha Mosque in Banja Luka

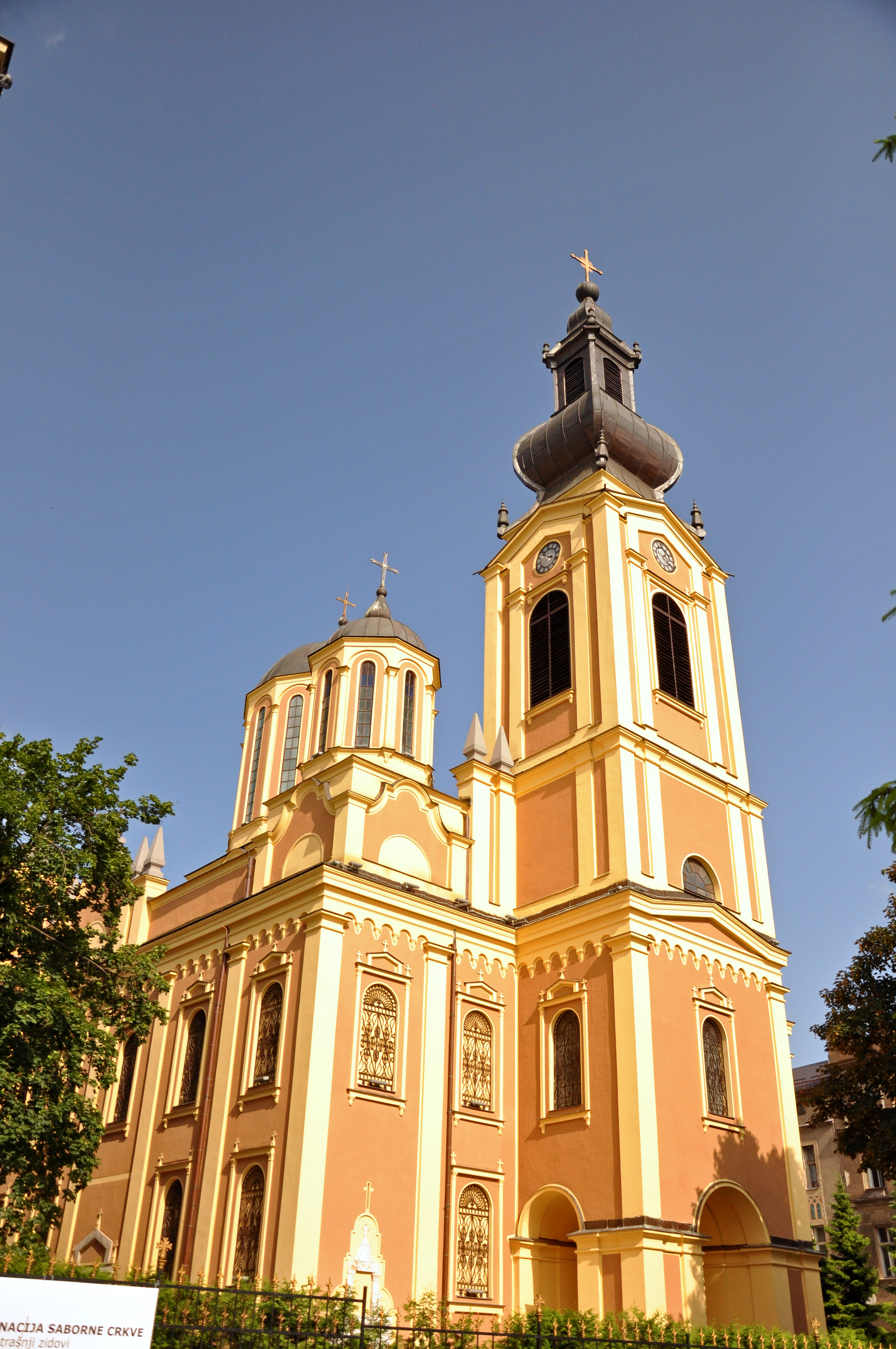
Cathedral of the Nativity of the Theotokos in Sarajevo

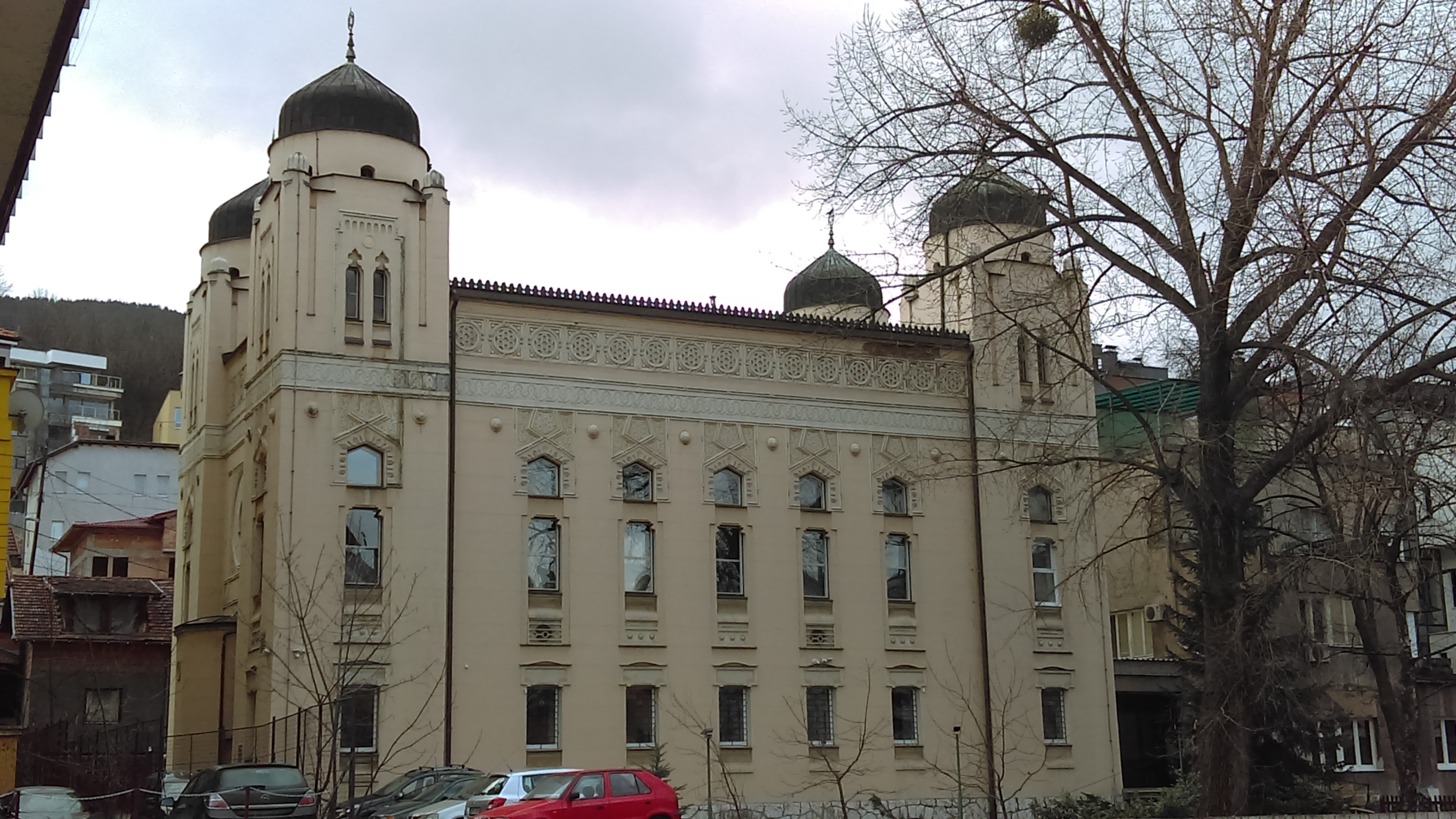
Sarajevo Synagogue

Weak administrative and judicial systems effectively restricted religious freedom and posed major obstacles to safeguarding the rights of religious minorities. In some cases local governments made improvements in protecting religious freedom; however, serious problems remained, including an atmosphere in which violations of religious freedom occurred. For example, local police rarely made arrests in cases of vandalism against religious buildings or violence and harassment against religious officials or believers. Successful prosecutions were extremely rare. Local police frequently alleged that juveniles, intoxicated individuals, or mentally unstable persons were responsible for these attacks.

Lack of uniform protection posed obstacles to safeguarding minority rights, despite improved police and judicial protection for minorities in some parts of the country. Ethnic quotas set for the recruitment of new officers into police academies were observed, but reforms intended to establish a countrywide effective, professional, multi-ethnic police force failed. Police forces as well as entity and local governments frequently allowed or encouraged an atmosphere in which violations of religious freedom could take place. In some cases the reluctance of police and prosecutors to aggressively investigate and prosecute crimes against religious minorities remained a major obstacle to safeguarding the rights of religious minorities. The appropriation of religious symbols and buildings for political purposes in combination with restrictions on religious services and ceremonies had a negative impact on inter-religious dialogue and inter-ethnic relations in many communities. Authorities of the majority religious or ethnic group often discriminated against those of the minority group in matters related to municipal services, including security and education.

Governments at the local level restricted religious services and ceremonies. In the eastern RS municipality of Bratunac, the Serb majority municipal assembly repeatedly denied a permit for the Islamic community to build a cemetery and memorial on its property surrounding a downtown mosque. Bosniak organizers hoped to bury 98 identified victims of a 1992 massacre in Bratunac in which more than 600 persons, including the local imam, were killed. Organizers planned to hold the burials at the mosque on May 12, 2007, the 15th anniversary of the massacre, but Serb veterans' associations and local residents protested the planned burials. The mayor and assembly denied the building permit, claiming that the proposed cemetery and memorial had not been envisioned in the town's urban plan. After more than a year of repeated requests and appeals from Bosniak organizers, the RS Government and the international community intervened, and the parties reached a last-minute agreement that enabled the burials to take place at a different location on the planned date.

Religious officials of Sarajevo's minority populations complained of discrimination by local authorities regarding the use of religious property, obstructionism in municipal services, and daily harassment such as the frequent towing of vehicles parked near churches and church offices.

In September 2006 in the eastern RS town of Zvornik, the Saint Sava primary school launched the new school year with a religious ceremony chaired by a Serbian Orthodox priest in the presence of more than 100 Bosniak students and parents. The incident received strong condemnation from the Islamic community, Bosniak associations, and the RS Minister of Education and Culture, who called the decision "inappropriate." However, school officials saw no problem with the event and indicated that it was a 15-year tradition to begin the school year in this manner and that attendance was not obligatory.

There were a number of controversial and highly politicized cases involving the illegal construction of religious buildings or monuments on private or government-owned land. In these cases the buildings or monuments were built to send a political message to minority believers about the dominance of the majority ethnic and religious group in that area, creating ethnic tensions and impeding the process of reconciliation.

An illegally constructed Serbian Orthodox church remained on the land of a Bosniak returnee in the town of Konjevic Polje in the eastern RS, despite the RS Ministry of Urban Planning's 2004 decision that the church should be removed. On September 11, 2006, for the second consecutive year, the local Orthodox priest celebrated Mass in the church, which was attended by a large number of attendees singing songs and wearing traditional clothing. Local police were present, and there was no violence. In June 2007 RS and Serbian Orthodox Church officials agreed in principle to relocate the church but had not found an alternate location by the end of the period covered by this report. A wooden Serbian Orthodox church unlawfully built on private Bosniak owned land in the town of Kotorsko continued to be the source of legal and ethnic conflict. Although deadlines were set by authorities for removal of the church, no action had been taken by the end of the period covered by this report.

The presence of a large stone cross and cement foundations for the eventual addition of more crosses in the ethnically divided town of Stolac in Herzegovina also remained contentious. In 2004 Federation authorities ordered the removal of the cross and foundations; however, the removal was delayed pending the outcome of a 2004 lawsuit on the legality of the Federation Government's decision. In September 2006 the Federation Constitutional Court upheld the constitutionality of the law, and the Federation Ministry of Spatial Planning was able again to launch an initiative for removal of the cross and foundations. While the Federation Ministry of Spatial Planning had the legal authority to undertake such an initiative, it was reluctant to do so out of concern that the action would increase inter-ethnic tensions during the election year. In May 2007 members of a Bosniak NGO illegally destroyed the additional foundations, but the cross remained.

Traditional religious communities all had extensive claims for restitution of property that the communist government of the former Yugoslavia nationalized after World War II. The State Law on Religious Freedom provides religious communities the right to restitution of expropriated property throughout the country "in accordance with the law." A special multi-ethnic restitution commission completed its mandate and delivered a draft restitution law to the Council of Ministers in early 2007 for approval. However, as of mid-2007 no action had been taken, and many believed that the law would not be passed without changes. In the absence of any state legislation specifically governing restitution, return of former religious properties continued on an ad hoc basis at the discretion of municipal officials but was usually completed only in favor of the majority group.

Many officials used property restitution cases as a tool of political patronage, rendering religious leaders dependent on politicians to regain property taken from religious communities. Other unresolved restitution claims were politically and legally complicated. For example, the Serbian Orthodox Church continued to seek the return of the building that housed the University of Sarajevo's Economic Faculty and compensation for the land on which the state parliament building is located. The Jewish and Muslim communities also asserted historic claims to many commercial and residential properties in Sarajevo. The Catholic community maintained a large number of similar claims in Banja Luka.

In May 2007 the Islamic community began proceedings against the RS city of Banja Luka seeking damages of approximately $1.1 million (1.5 million Bosnian convertible marks) for the wartime destruction of all mosques in the city. The Islamic community filed the original lawsuit in 2000 but began proceedings again when an out-of-court settlement failed because the city would not make the requested admission of guilt.

During the period covered by this report, the Federation municipality of Travnik partially complied with a 2003 decision by the Human Rights Chamber (renamed the Human Rights Commission of the Constitutional Court) ordering the municipal government to relocate a public school housed in a building formerly owned by the Catholic archdiocese. The municipality returned half the building to the archdiocese for use as part of its Catholic school center. However, the other half remained in use as a public school. The court ordered the public school to move out of the building by July 1, 2006, but by that date authorities had not allocated funding for a new school building, and the building remained in use as a public school.

Minority religious communities also encountered difficulty in obtaining permits for new churches and mosques. The Catholic Church continued to seek permission, first solicited in 2000, to build a new church in the Sarajevo neighborhood of Grbavica, but complained that the local authorities, a Bosniak majority, refused to grant the permit.

There were no reports of religious prisoners or detainees in the country, or of forced religious conversion.

== See also ==
- Islam in Bosnia and Herzegovina
- Eastern Orthodoxy in Bosnia and Herzegovina
- Roman Catholicism in Bosnia and Herzegovina
- Protestantism in Bosnia and Herzegovina
- Judaism in Bosnia and Herzegovina
- Bahá'í Faith in Bosnia and Herzegovina
