= O Kanal =

- Country: Bosnia and Herzegovina
- Broadcast area: Bosnia and Herzegovina and Worldwide
- Headquarters: Sarajevo

Programming
- Language: Bosnian language
- Picture format: HD

Ownership
- Owner: Media group Oslobodjenje
- Key people: (General Director)

History
- Launched: 26 August 2010

Links
- Website: https://okanal.oslobodjenje.ba/

Availability

Terrestrial
- Terrestrial signal: Yes

Streaming media
- Online streaming(certain shows): On website
- Video on demand: On website

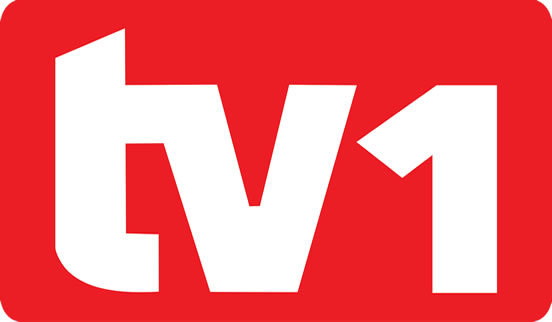
Former O Kanal logo as TV1

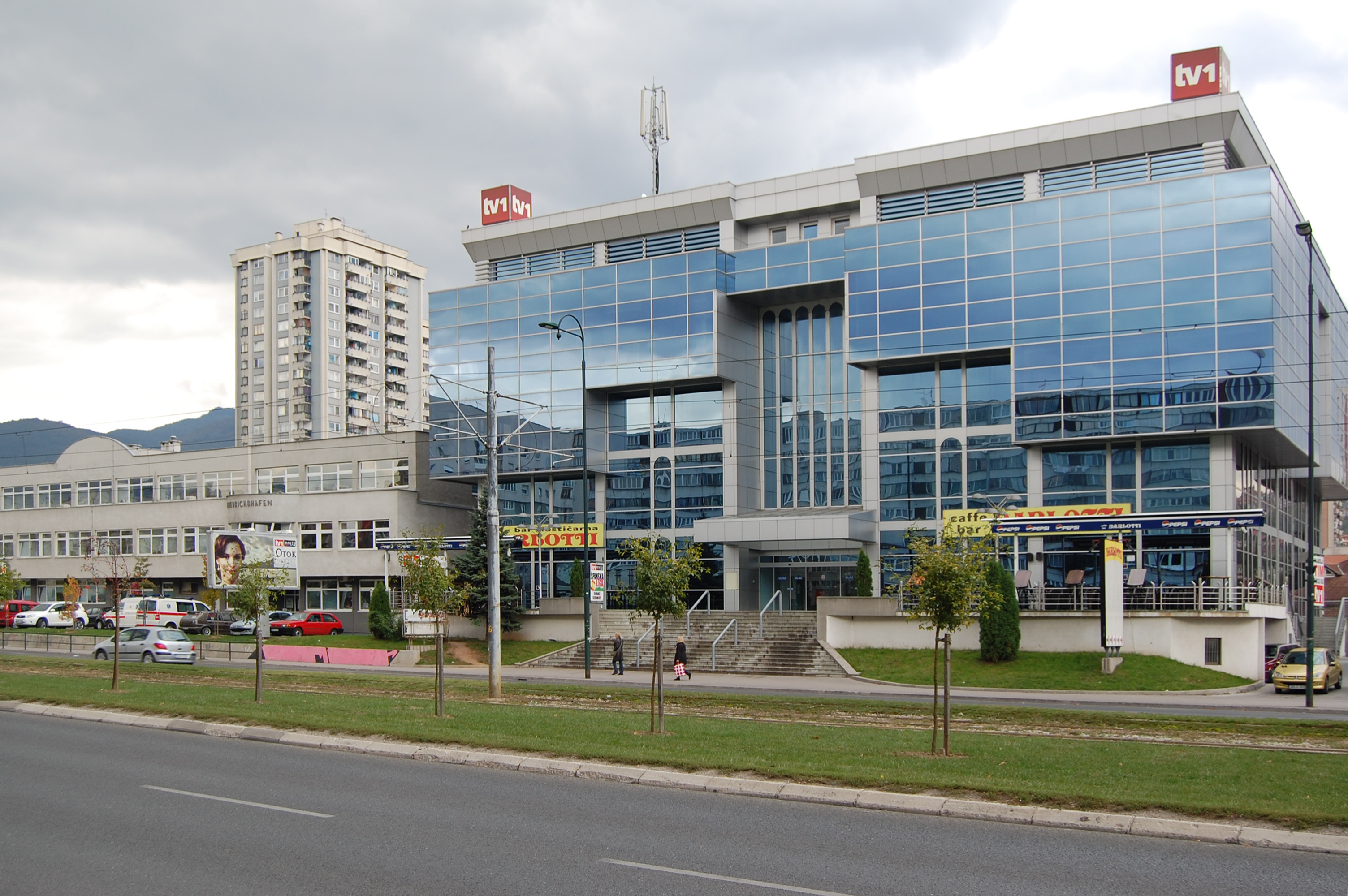
Former TV1 headquarters in Sarajevo

O Kanal (formerly TV1) is a Bosnian commercial infotainment television channel based in Sarajevo. It started broadcasting on 26 August 2010. The program airs continuously in the Bosnian language. Content includes news, series, talk shows, entertainment, sports, movies and documentaries.

Reporters and correspondents of O Kanal are located in Mostar, Tuzla, Zenica and Banja Luka.

Editors and TV hosts include: Zerina Ćosić Vrabac, Kenan Ćosić, Indira Šahbazović, Maida Burgić, Andi Mioč, Vladimir Čolaković, Amina Zornić, Mirza Salković

Journalists in the O Kanal newsroom include: Jovanka Nina Todorović, Adisa Herco, Bojan Govedarica

Production is based at a digitized television studio in Sarajevo, from which live events and "breaking news" programs on O Kanal are aired.

O Kanal is the owner of the Bosnian television network, Mreža TV, which airs popular series, movies, and sports programs.

== Previously on O Kanal ==
=== Foreign series ===
Bosnian language translation	Original name
Otok smrti	Harpers Island
Otok	To Nisi
Junska noć	Haziran Gecesi
Medicinska istraga	Medical Investigation
Pod sretnom zvijezdom	Pod sretnom zvijezdom
Dr. Martin	Doc Martin
Bonanza	Bonanza
Tek rođeni	Maternity Ward
Igra	The Game
Ukradeni životi	The Law of Love
Zakon ljubavi	Vidas Robadas
Morska patrola	Sea Patrol
Irene Huss	Detective Inspector Huss
Corleone	Il Capo dei Capi
Eliza	Elisa di Rivombrosa
Türkan	Türkan
Strasti i intrige	Botineras
Kınalı Kar	Kınalı Kar
Put za Avonlea	Road to Avonlea
Sva moja djeca	Butun Cocuklarim
Jesen stiže dunjo moja	Jesen stiže dunjo moja

=== Documentaries ===
Documentary films produced by Australian World Wide Entertainment production:

- Odlazak u svemir – (Quest)
- Historija odjeće I odjevanja – (Plimsolls to platforms)
- Okusi svijeta – (Cultural flavors)
- O zdravlju – (Inside health)
- Događaji koji su promijenili svijet – (Where were you?!)
- Ikone – (Icons)
- Superzvijezde – (Superstars)
- Drugi svjetski rat – (World War II)

=== Sports Programs ===
- La Liga broadcaster
- Formula One broadcaster (2011)
- Traditional jumps in Neretva river from the Old Bridge in Mostar (Live TV coverage)
