= Ponijevo =

- Village
- Location within Bosnia and Herzegovina
- Coordinates: 44°29′N 18°03′E
- Country: Bosnia and Herzegovina
- Entity: Federation of Bosnia and Herzegovina
- Canton: Zenica-Doboj
- Municipality: Žepče

Area
  - Total: 1.59 sq mi (4.13 km^{2})

Population (2013)
  - Total: 864
  - Density: 542/sq mi (209/km^{2})
- Time zone: UTC+1 (CET)
  - Summer (DST): UTC+2 (CEST)

Ponijevo is a village in the municipality of Žepče, Bosnia and Herzegovina. Historical records show that the village has been inhabited since the Neolithic. The modern Ponijevo is associated to foundation of a catholic parish in the village in the 19th century, and the migrations of Croats from Dalmatia and Herzegovina to this region during this period, as well as the migrations that ensued after the most recent Bosnian war.

== History ==
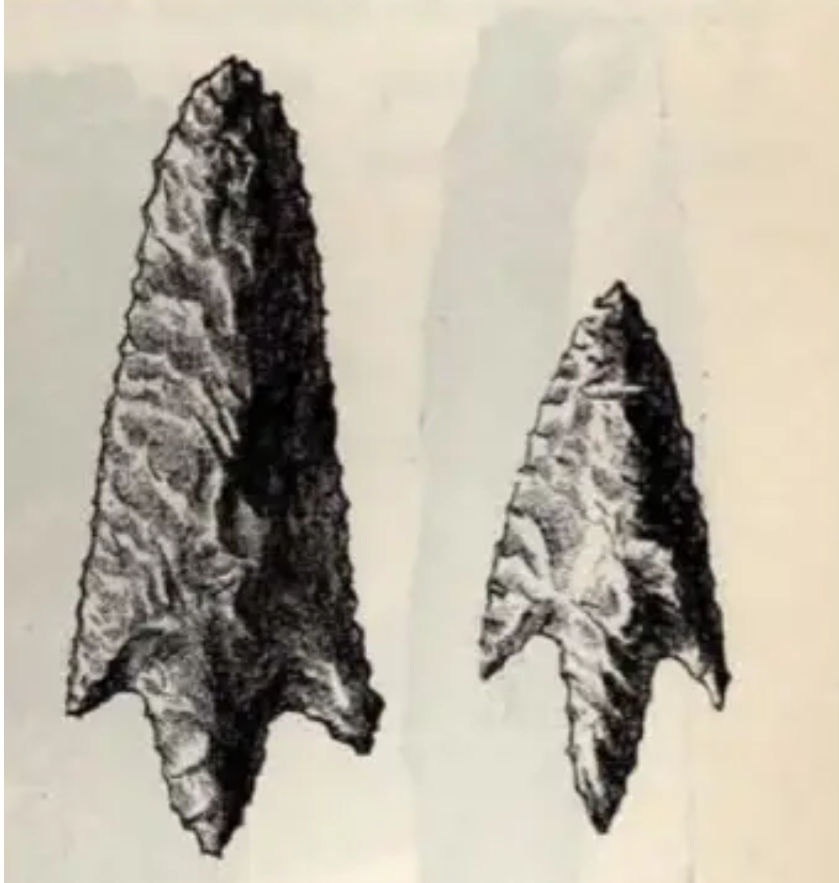
Darts found by Tomo Dragičević in 1896 at Čustuša field, where a Neolithic settlement "Kraljičino guvno" of the Butmir culture were discovered.

Ponijevo has been inhabited in the Neolithic times, judging by the archeological site "Kraljičino guvno" (fields "Čustuša" and "Gajevi"), which are situated in the vicinity of the elementary school in Ponijevo. These archeological findings were first described in 1897 by Tomo Dragičević, an Austro-Hungarian soldier and an amateur archaeologist, who found various tools made of finely dressed stone, among them scrapers, darts, saws, drills, knives, hatchets, chisels, and grinders. The site was further explored by Ćiro Truhelka between 1906 and 1908, during which other Neolithic settlements in the wider Novi Šeher area were found. He discovered large pieces of ornamental ceramics, and established that people settled in this area perfected stone dressing to produce objects that were later used for trading. These neolithic findings are from one of eight archeological sites of the Butmir culture, and can be found at National Museum of Bosnia and Herzegovina in Sarajevo.

During the Ottoman rule of Bosnia and Herzegovina, Eugene of Savoy briefly raided the Ottoman Bosnia with Austrian troops in 1697. During the Austrian withdrawal from Sarajevo, around 40 000 Catholics left in fear of retaliation from the Ottomans, among them also the Catholics from the present-day Ponijevo region. The Franciscan priests from Kreševo brought Catholics from the Dalmatian Hinterland and Herzegovina in the wider area, and it is most likely that the current inhabitants of Ponijevo are descendants of people that settled in this area during these migrations.

Further historical records on Ponijevo refer to more recent times, when a chaplaincy was founded there in 1854., bearing the name "Ponievo", same as the land on which it was founded. Previously a part of the Osova parish, the chaplaincy's land was bought by three priests; Luka Dropuljić, Filip Bošnjaković, and Grgo Martić. It is probable that the chaplaincy was founded because traveling to Osova, ~9 km away from Ponijevo, was impractical. The chaplaincy later became a parish in 1872.

Approximately in this period, a Franciscan priest Franjo Momčinović published a hand-written satirical periodical "Bismilah", first published on September 3, 1864. The "Bismillah" is an important piece of publishing history of present-day Bosnia and Herzergovina, and the second journal published in Bosnia after "Bosnian Friend" ("Bosanski prijatelj"), which was published in 1850.

During the Austro-Hungarian rule in Bosnia and Herzegovina, general literacy and religious freedom are evolving. In 1893, an elementary school is opened in the vicinity of Ponijevo, in Novi Šeher, while Josip Stadler demands that the Ponijevo chaplaincy is moved to Novi Šeher in 1895, in order for the parish to be close to commerce and better road infrastructure.

In the 20th century, the people of Ponijevo lived through three different wars; World War I, World War II, and the Bosnian war, and five different regimes; the Austro-Hungarian rule, Kingdom of Yugoslavia, Independent State of Croatia, Socialist Federal Republic of Yugoslavia, most recently Bosnia and Herzegovina. An unstable political landscape, along with war casualties have stretched the population of Ponijevo beyond their means, especially after the World War II, when the population faced an immense struggle while transitioning from an agrarian society to an industrial society. In the 1970s, many men left to work in Germany in the gastarbeiter programme, sending home valuable remittances that fed numerous families.

It is also in this period that the people in the village are starting to use consumer products regularly, whereby previously, when objects were owned, they were often handmade or inherited, while buying was done only exceptionally.

Today, although heavily marked with the last war, Ponijevo's community is still upholding customs and traditions that have been kept Croats firmly on Bosnian territory for so long. In order to mark 150 years of the parish foundation, a chapel was built on the site where the parish was first founded, and now serves to mark the beginning of local celebrations of Saint Elijah.

== Name ==
The origin of the name Ponijevo is not known. The records that date the foundation of the Ponijevo chaplaincy suggest that two out of the three properties acquired to found the parish were called Ponievo. The spelling Ponievo corresponds to an alternative grammatical system, korijenski pravopis, which was very common from the mid-19th up until the beginning of the 20th century.

The name Seona is used in church registers between 1856 and 1888, with Seona being sometime distinguished from Ponijevo as a separate settlement, and sometimes used in conjunction. In the Monograph on friar Grgo Martić, its author Augustin Čičić states that the name of the village is Ponievo, while the name of the exact location of the parish residence is named Seona. In other sources, parts of nearby villages are associated via a double naming to names Ponievo or Seona (e.g. Pire is at times mentioned in different forms such as Pire (Ponievo), Ponievo Piri, Seona Piri, and Pire obćina Ponievo). These registered inconsistencies are twofold; first, cadastral boundaries over time have changed, and second, early priests in Ponijevo have been educated abroad and thus adopted different versions of spelling, blurring the subject on the name of Ponijevo. Further systematization of church registers might aid in establishing the meaning behind these toponyms.

== Geography and climate ==
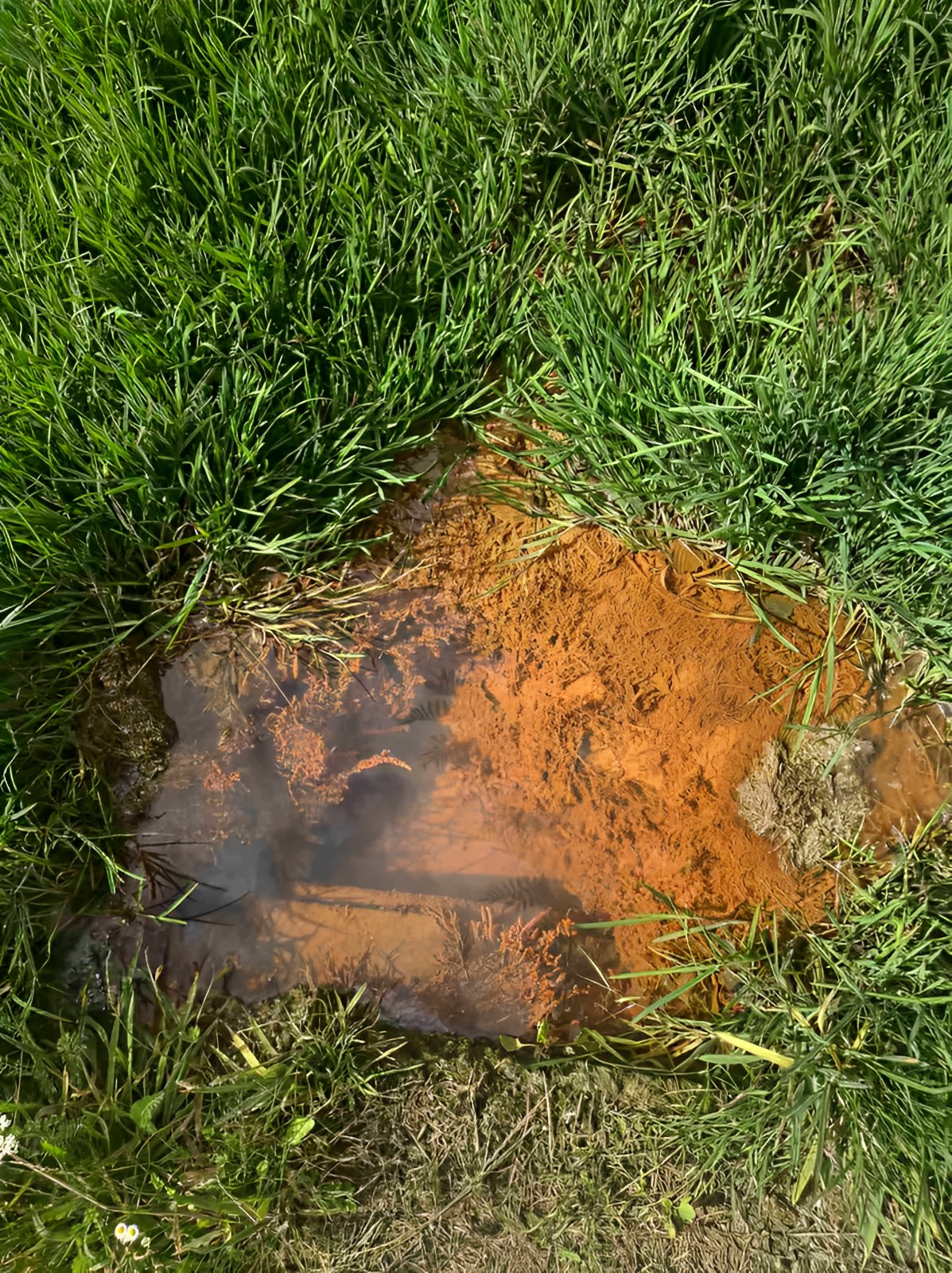
Kiseljak Ponijevo, a natural mineral water spring flowing in the village.

The village is situated in the hilly Bosnian countryside, below Matinski Vis (964 m), and is surrounded by two rivers, Matinska and Piranska river, each bearing the names of villages that surround Ponijevo, Matina and Pire. The area is rich in water, with water sources dotting the village on several locations. Slatina creek collects local waters and runs through the village and flows into Liješnica river. The creek is often referred to as "Rijeka" ("River") by the locals, independently of its modest volume. There is a source of natural mineral water in the village called Slatina (unofficially "Kiseljak", meaning acidic), which leaves a copper-colored trail on the surrounding grounds due to its high mineral content. Slatina divides the village into two parts, Malo Ponijevo and Veliko Ponijevo. The scarce geological studies done in the area have shown that the area between Ponijevo and Brezove dane contains coal.

The climate is temperate and continental, with four distinguishable seasons. The summer season temperatures average around 25 °C, while the January temperatures average at around 0 °C. The annual precipitation is around 1000 mm, with high variations due to the geographic properties and most recently climate change.

Ponijevo abounds with meadows, hills, and occasional woods. The meadows were historically converted to arable land in order to grow cereals, fruit and vegetables commonly grown in Central Europe such as potatoes, apples, and wheat. The humus presence and land fertility depend on the presence of water and altitude, but is generally very favorable and has high ecological agriculture potential.

== Education ==
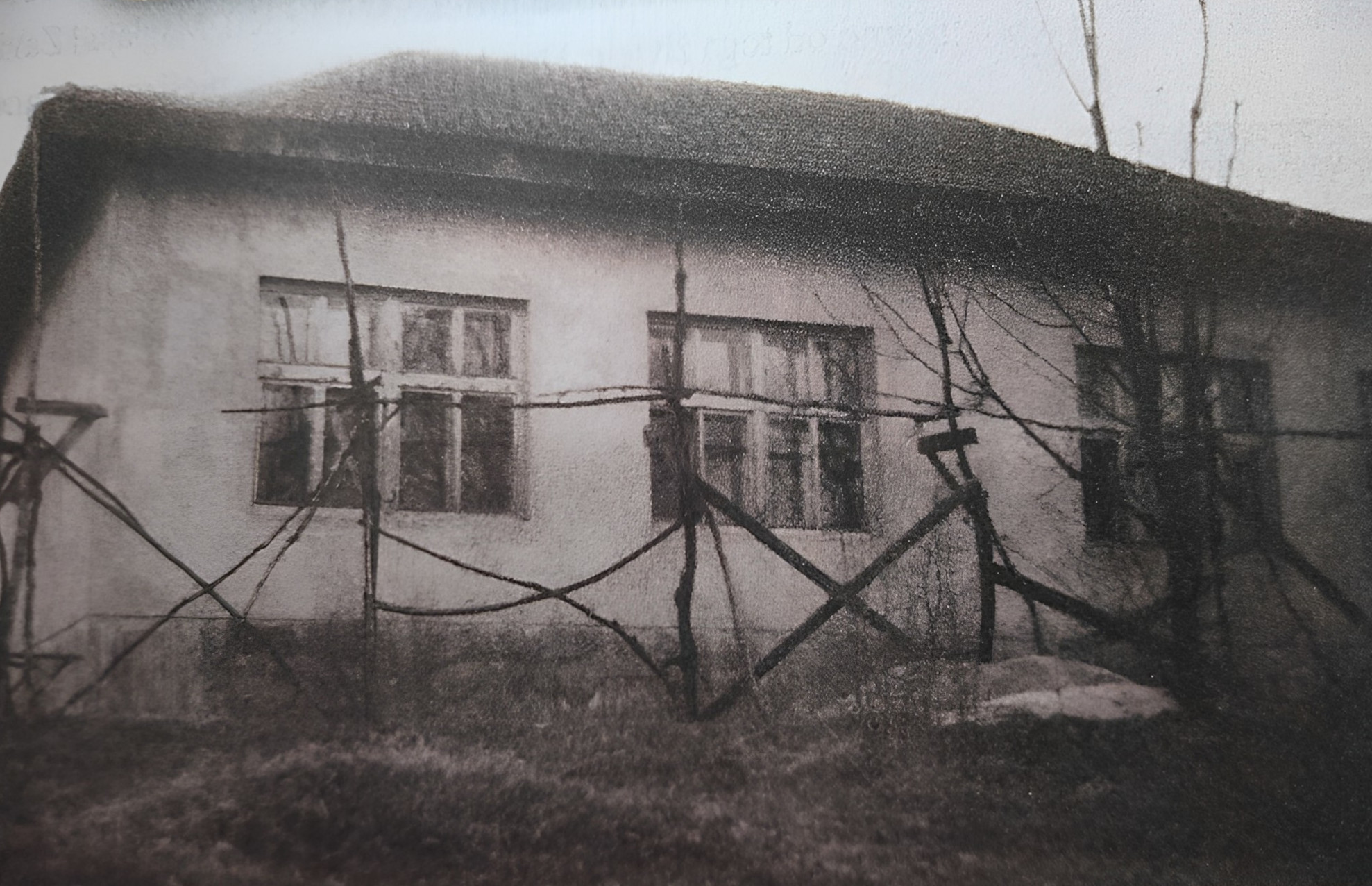
Ponijevo school in the 1970s.

Up until the 19th century, literacy of the people of Ponijevo was ecclesiastical and associated to the Catholic Church clergy. In 1893, a state school was founded in Novi Šeher, near Ponijevo, which served all nearby villages, including Ponijevo. The school offered a four-year educational programme, which is equivalent to the first half of the modern elementary education. Very few Ponijevo children attended the school, as schooling was not prioritized in agrarian communities, where child labor was commonplace.

Later on, evening courses were organized by the literate village population for the illiterate. Studying writing and reading during one-month classes culminated with passing an exam in front of a qualified jury, who then issued a certificate of literacy to the pupils. In 1910, in the general Ponijevo area, "žepački kotar", the literacy of men stood at 20.3%, while the literacy of women was higher than in surrounding areas, and mounted to 12.20%.

The beginning of literacy for the general population in Ponijevo is dated to 1953, when an elementary school "28. Novembar" ("November 28") was built. The school served not only Ponijevo, but also the neighbouring villages Matina and Pire, and offered a four-year educational programme, which was then completed in Novi Šeher for a full elementary education of eight years. The school was composed of two distinct parts, the classrooms and the living quarters. The classrooms were decorated in a simple fashion, with wooden benches, a blackboard, and an abacus. This simple decorum did not significantly change over the entire duration of the existence of the school. Children, coming from modest households, initially arrived to the school barefoot and with no equipment, arriving to school at daylight, since most households did not have a clock.

The school, founded during the Socialist Federal Republic of Yugoslavia, hosted teachers from other parts of Yugoslavia, hence the necessary living quarters, and promoted the principles of brotherhood and unity among students. These teachers also worked on adult literacy, by organizing courses ("tečaj") and their role was "to enlighten adult comrades in the socialist and atheistic spirit". Although Ponijevo was a Croatian village, the official language of the Socialist Federal Republic of Yugoslavia was Serbo-Croatian, and the children were taught both the Cyrillic and the Latin script. The first teacher of local teacher of Croatian origin was Mara Čaić, who originates from Novi Šeher, and who continued teaching students into the 1990s.

During the Bosnian war, when many women and children left to become refugees in safer areas, the school operated to the best of its capabilities, and depending on the circumstances, especially during 1992 and 1993. Starting from the 1994, children received basic school supplies from UNICEF and were taught in an improvised fashion as no textbooks were available. The school continued to operate in a deteriorated state until 2005, after which it was demolished, leaving a small plain behind.

A new "Elementary School Friar Grga Martić" (Osnovna Škola Fra Grga Martić") was built close to the historical "Kraljičino guvno" archeological site, along with a school playground, which was financed by Ivan Rakitić, a Croatian footballer whose mother Kata (née Papić) is a Ponijevo native. The educational system in the current Bosnia and Herzegovina is decentralized and the curriculum is determined by the local county. As such, the school follows a Croatian educational curriculum, and the children are taught in Croatian language in a nine-year elementary school programme.

Secondary education (high school) among local population became common in the 1970s, as the population became richer. The children were educated in specialized schools or gymnasiums in the local cities, Maglaj and Žepče. Tertiary, university education was uncommon up until the 1990s. The first person with a university degree from Ponijevo was friar Petar Perković, who studied theology.

== Infrastructure ==
The village receives water from natural springs that are collected in common pools, which were built by the local population in the 1980s. The village was electrified in 1971, and a phone line was installed in 1987. The houses in the village are placed near a gravel road that connects the village with Novi Šeher and Matina, and branches to connect Malo and Veliko Ponijevo. The road, initially used for transport by horses or oxen up until the mid-20th century, was paved in 2005. The communal waste collection and public lightning were organized recently, in 2020.

The graveyard in Ponijevo dates from 1864, the first person being buried there was Kata Bonić, a 16-year-old girl that died of smallpox. Prior to that, the locals were buried in surrounding villages, Marina and Pire. Even after the Ponijevo graveyard was built, some burials were still done in nearby villages, especially when young children died, so as not to separate them from their parents and relatives. In 2020, the graveyard fence was reconstructed, and small paths leading to various parts of the graveyards were built.

== Culture ==
Ponijevo's culture is primarily marked by Croatian heritage, with some Turkish influences stemming from the centuries-long Ottoman rule. Historically, the population of Ponijevo lived as an agrarian society, as was common in the European countryside, up until the mid-20th century. Households were composed of several family units that lived together, and land ownership and cultivation ensured livelihoods. Everyday objects such as farming tools, clothes, and toys were made of materials that were either available in nature or grown specifically for purpose of making them. For example, pitchforks and scythes were made of wood, clothes were made of linen by cultivation of flax, which was transformed into fabrics by using looms, while Christmas decorations and children's toys were made of corn leaves and stalks. Even cleaning products and shampoos were hand-made from wood ashes ("lukšija"). The households had effectively very low carbon footprint, until the mid-20th century, when consumer culture started developing world-wide, and started penetrating Ponijevo's households. This was in part due to the overall modernization of Yugoslavia, but also due to people that worked in the gastarbeiter programme in western countries, bringing with them consumer culture.

The culture of Ponijevo's inhabitants is closely related to their catholic faith. One of the best examples is sicanje, a tradition first described by Ćiro Truhelka in the 19th century, whereby men and women were tattooed with crosses and their Christian names on their hands and forearms. This tradition largely disappeared in the mid-20th century, and has been restored internationally as a cultural trend. The written cultural production is also associated to the catholic priests that lived in Ponijevo in the 19th century when a parish existed there. The earliest literary production are texts from the 19th century that serve as parish property inventories, and later on, correspondence among priests. During this period, a satirical journal "Bismilah" was published, and friar Grgo Martić, who wrote his most famous work, The Avengers ("Osvetnici"), during his Ponijevo stay. The music sang in this area is often accompanied by šargija, a plucked lute, and dancing in kolo, a southern-slavic circle dance.

Religious and catholic customs set the yearly calendar of yearly festivities that happen in Ponijevo and the surrounding villages. Pilgrimages are common throughout the year; among them the most important non-local pilgrimages are St. John's in Podmilačje and Marian sanctuary in Komušina-Kondžilo and more recently to Međugorje. Local pilgrimages in nearby villages include St. Anna in Radunice and St. Francis in Goleše. Since 1888, the graveyards are associated to saints, and such is the case of Ponijevo graveyard, which is associated to Saint Marcus, celebrated on April 25. Saint Marcus' day ("Markovdan") is celebrated in Ponijevo with a mass at the local graveyard, after which each household organizes a party for their visiting relatives and friends. Ponijevo is also where the celebrations of St. Elijah, which is the patron saint of the nearby Novi Šeher, begin by celebrating a mass at the chapel built on the site of the 19th century parish.

Traces of Turkish culture are visible in the food and language. The gastronomy in Ponijevo, as elsewhere in Bosnia and Herzegovina, carries Turkish influences through burek, sarma, ćevapi and other traditional dishes. These dishes are often prepared with pork fat or meat, setting them apart from Muslim traditions, and recreating these dishes in new flavors. Meat is widely consumed, including the roasted sucking pig, sudžuk, and pečenica (peka). The standard štokavian Croatian dialect is spoken, but with a local variant that use borrowed Turkish words more abundantly than in the standard variety, while some letters are often omitted from pronunciation, such as h (Hrvat - Rvat), i (lisica - lisca), and o (onako - nako).

== Bismilah ==
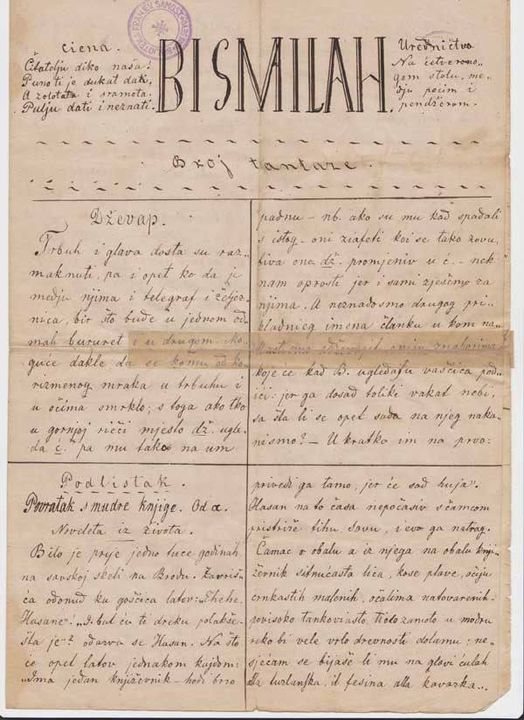
Bismilah, a satirical journal from Ponijevo, first published in 1864.

Up until the late 19th century, spreading of education and culture among the catholic population in Bosnia was entrusted to the Franciscancs, who first arrived to Bosnia in the 13th century. Ponijevo was at the center of a cultural event in the history of Bosnia and Herzegovina, as friar Frano Momčinović, associated with the Ponijevo chaplaincy started publishing "Bismilah", a satirical periodical that published commentary on world affairs in a humorous fashion. The word "Bismilah" is an Islamic phrase meaning "In the name of God". Its use as the title probably reflects the political subjects discussed which was in stark contrast with the humorous, witty, and satirical form.

Bismilah was handwritten in a four-page format and copied in a small number of examples, which were disseminated in closed clerical circles. The total number issues are not known, it is certain that there were at least three, of which two are archived at the Franciscan Friary in Kreševo. Although written in the latin script and Croatian / Bosnian language, the content is difficult to understand without the deep understanding of the European history and politics at the time. Momčinović's commentary comments on the affairs of Austria, Italy, Prussia, Poland, Russia, but also covers the relations with the local Turks. The latter was especially risky considering the centuries-long grip and presence of the Ottoman Empire in Bosnia, hence the small number of copies of the journal that circulated in safe hands.

The first issue is dated September 3, 1864, while the place of publication is marked to be "Rovinje nad Novim Šeherom", which is to say Ponijevo. The editorial office is humorously described as "above the fallen corner" and "at the four-legged table between the stove and the windowsill", referring to the modest conditions of the chaplaincy residences. Similarly, the price of the paper is described as something that will "not burden anyone", while the circulation frequency is formalized as "when the printer prints it".

Momčinović used pseudonyms such as Pritucalo Smetenović, Pritucalo Elbetenović, and Nadko Prijanović, which are all humorous names referring to the writer's simplicity. The writing style is popular in that many wordplays, idioms, Turkish loan words, and rare linguistic forms are used, all of which deserve a closer linguistic exploration.

Literacy development was poor in Ponijevo. Momčinović's was a pioneer, given that "Bismilah" was the second journal that started in Bosnia and Herzegovina's publishing history.

== Demographics ==
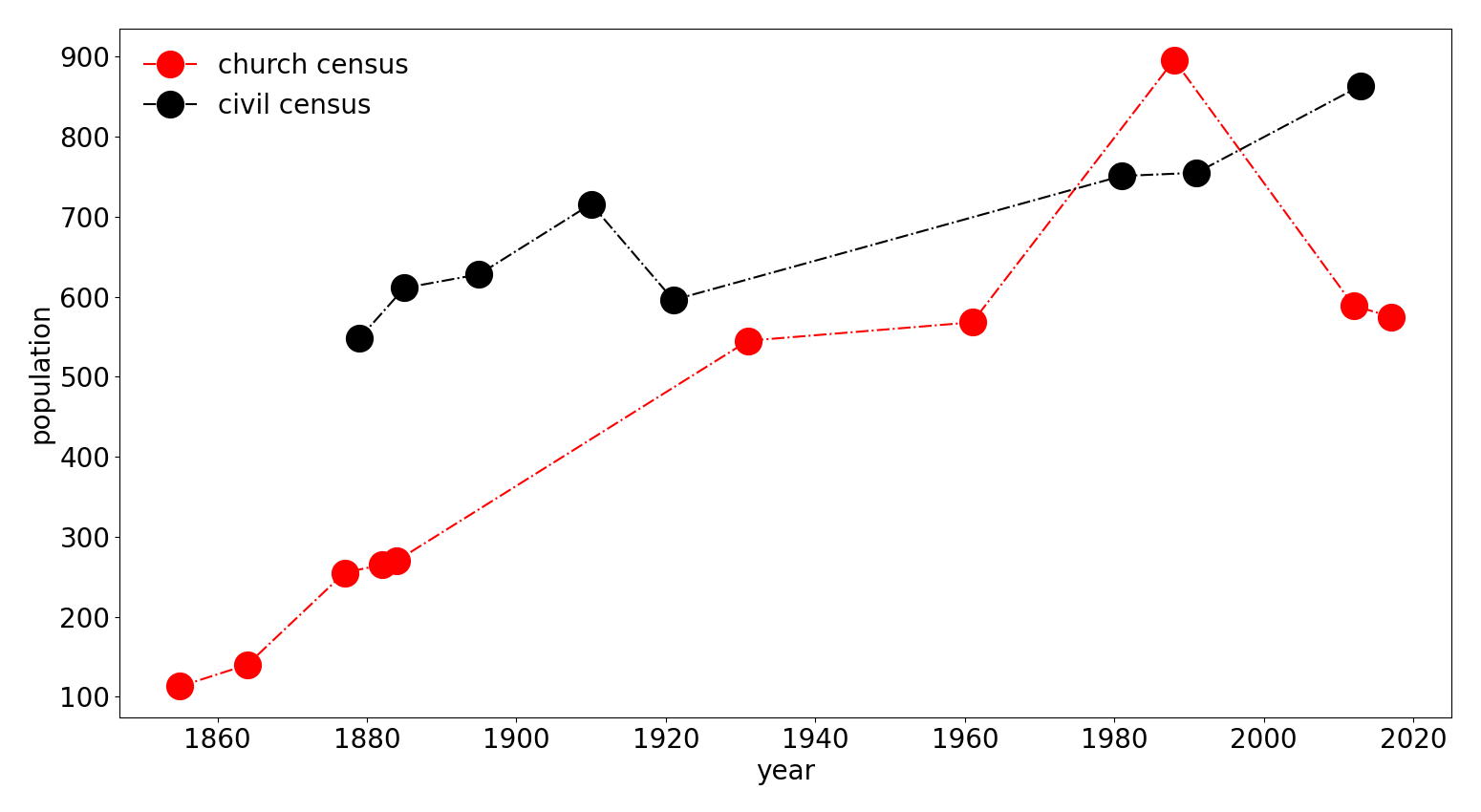
Ponijevo demographics in the period 1885-2017.

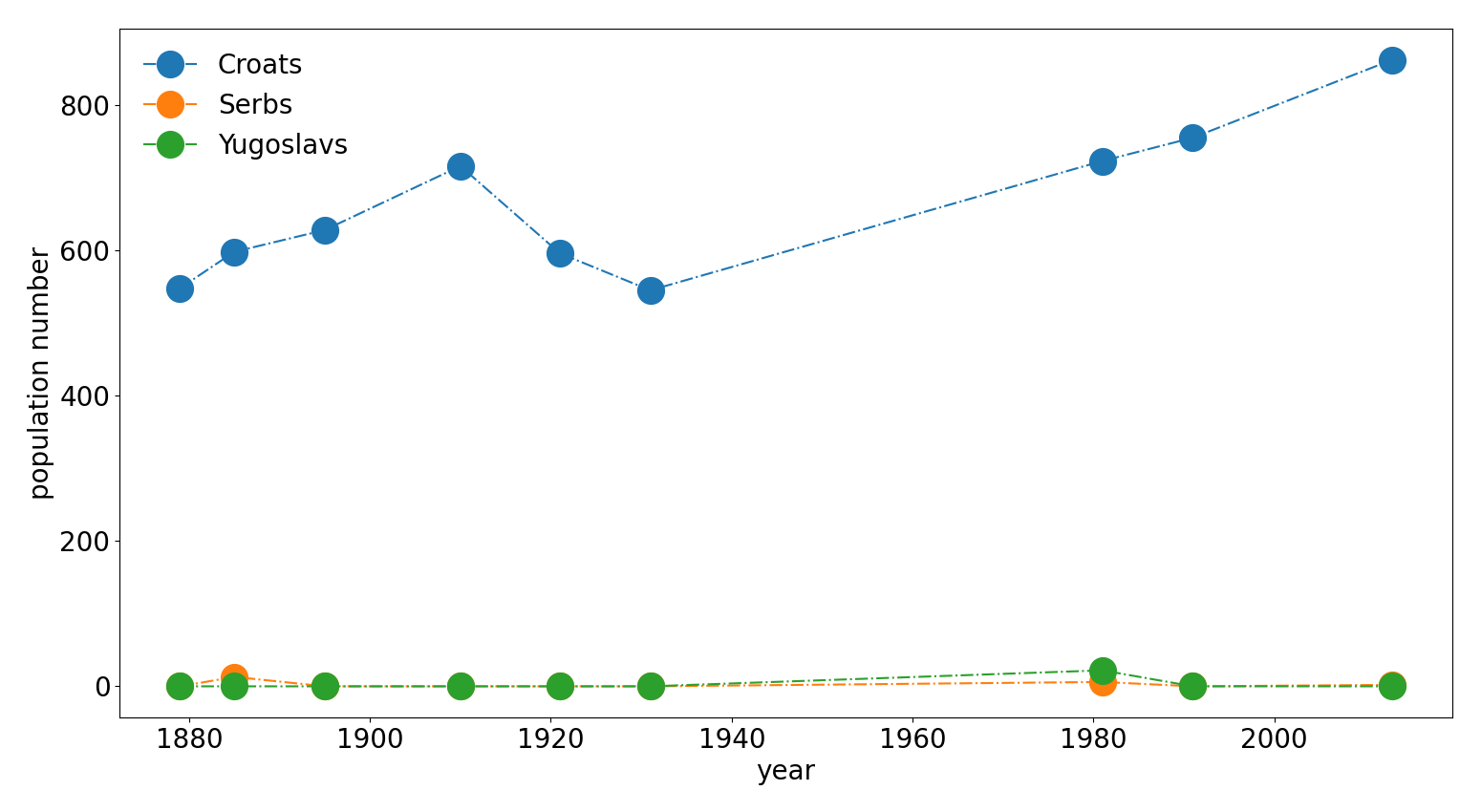
Population ethnicity in Ponijevo in the period from 1879 to 2013.

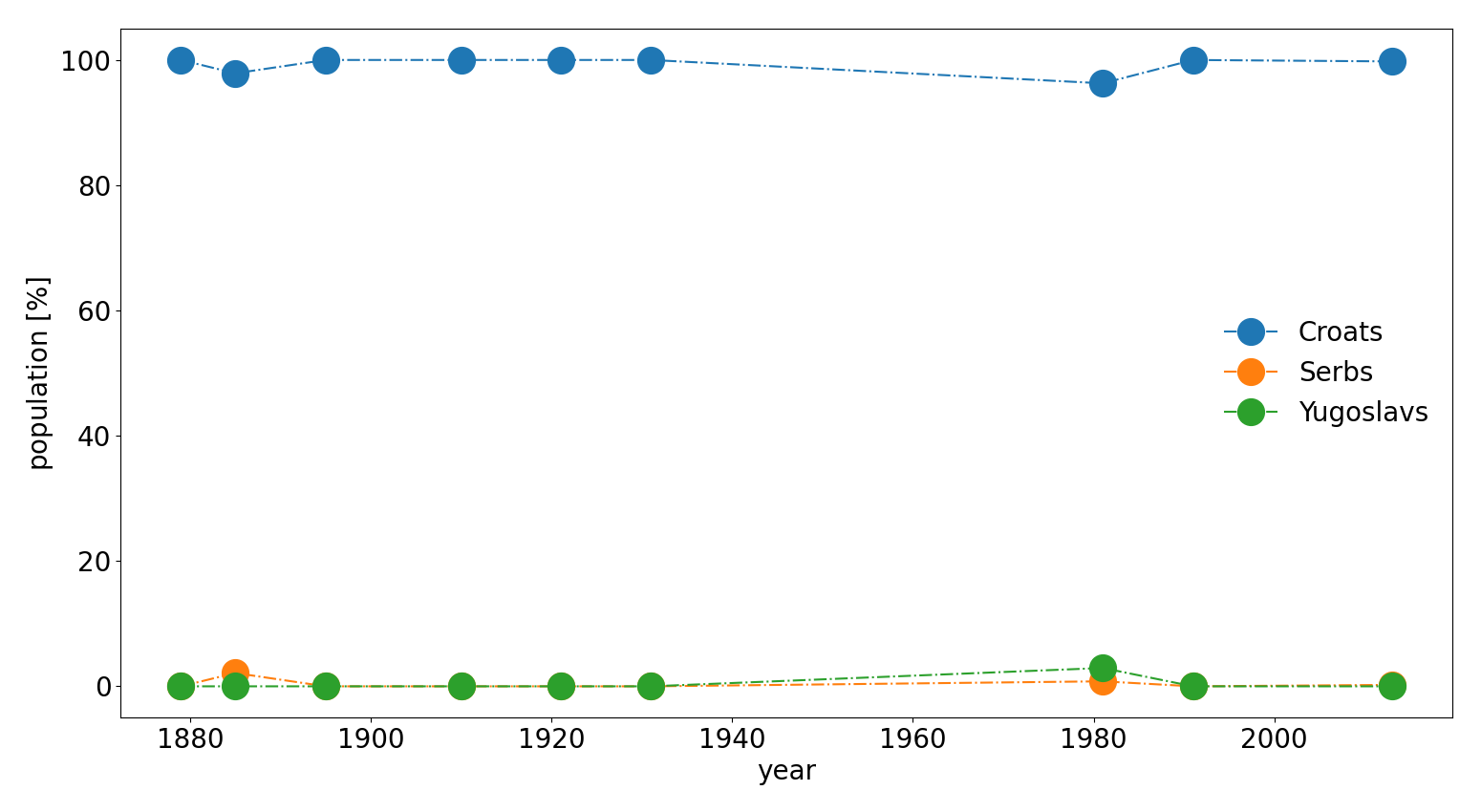
Population ethnicity in Ponijevo expressed in percentages in the period from 1879 to 2013.

The population of Ponijevo has historically been subjected to migratory pressures. Letter exchanges between Andrija Torkvat Brlić and friar Grgo Martić dating from February 3, 1862, indicate that the population of the Novi Šeher region, including Ponijevo, is of Dalamtian descent. Additionally, the official registry books indicate that many descendants also came from Herzegovina. The registry books dating from the 19th century show inconsistencies in surnames, due to different spellings, pronunciations, and general lack of importance that was attached to properly registering the inhabitants' names over time.

Numerous censuses in Ponijevo allow us to understand the evolution of the number of inhabitants since the 19th century. The systematization of population is drawn from multiple sources, as censuses were censuses associated to the church and state institutions. At times, these contain details on ethnic compositions of population, whereby a good systematization is provided by Franjo Marić.

The first census in 1855, reveals that there were 14 catholic families, 17 married couples, and 113 people in Ponijevo in total. The number of families is smaller than the number of couples as multiple couples commonly lived together and belong to the same family.

From the church censuses taken over the period of 160 years, the evolution of the catholic population of Ponijevo can be followed. The population was increasing up until the Bosnian war in the 1990s. There was a slowdown in growth in the period of World War II, during which the number of war casualties was supplemented with a typhus outbreak. The largest drop in the population is during the most recent war, when the population decreased by 35%.

The first systematic census of the population was taken in 1879 during the Austro-Hungarian rule in Bosnia. This census is also the beginning of an era in which we begin to have a better idea on the ethnic composition of Bosnia and Ponijevo over the period of 130 years. During the first four Austrian censuses, the total number of populations living in Ponijevo is significantly higher than the number reported by the church census, often more than double. This is likely because the population was enumerated over a different surface, which might have included other neighbouring villages. Systematic censuses also show a drop in population numbers in the early 20th century, likely due to World war I and disease. The state census also does not show a drop in population numbers due to the Bosnian war.

The systematic censuses contain data showing that Ponijevo is historically a catholic and Croatian village. Although the inhabitants of Ponijevo have always lived near Muslims, there seems to have been no Muslims in the village in the past 130 years. A small population of Serbs resided at times in Ponijevo, while around 3% of the population identified as Yugoslavs in the 1980s, during the Socialist Federal Republic of Yugoslavia, when Brotherhood and unity was promoted, while national and religious sentiments were repressed. Overall, in terms of percentages, the Croatian and catholic population in Ponijevo varies from a low of 97.9% in 1885 to 100% in the majority of censuses taken over the past 130 years, which reflects the extreme effort of the local population to preserve their ethnic and religious customs.

Ethnicity evolution in Ponijevo
| Year | Croats (%) | Muslims (%) | Serbs (%) | Yugoslavs (%) | Others (%) | Total |
|---|---|---|---|---|---|---|
| 1879 | 548 (100%) | 0 (0%) | 0 (0%) | 0 (0%) | 0 (0%) | 548 |
| 1885 | 598 (97.9%) | 0 (0%) | 13 (2.1%) | 0 (0%) | 0 (0%) | 611 |
| 1895 | 628 (100%) | 0 (0%) | 0 (0%) | 0 (0%) | 0 (0%) | 628 |
| 1910 | 716 (100%) | 0 (0%) | 0 (0%) | 0 (0%) | 0 (0%) | 716 |
| 1921 | 596 (100%) | 0 (0%) | 0 (0%) | 0 (0%) | 0 (%) | 596 |
| 1931 | 545 (100%) | 0 (0%) | 0 (0%) | 0 (0%) | 0 (0%) | 545 |
| 1981 | 723 (96.3%) | 0 (0%) | 6 (0.8%) | 22 (2.9%) | 0 (0%) | 751 |
| 1991 | 755 (100%) | 0 (0%) | 0 (0%) | 0 (0%) | 0 (0%) | 755 |
| 2013 | 862 (99.8%) | 0 (0%) | 2 (0.2%) | 0 (0%) | 0 (0%) | 864 |
