= Tatarbudžak =

- Village
- Location within Bosnia and Herzegovina
- Coordinates: 44.4429214°N 18.0380565°E
- Country: Bosnia and Herzegovina
- Entity: Federation of Bosnia and Herzegovina
- Canton: Zenica-Doboj
- Municipality: Žepče

Area
  - Total: 1.22 sq mi (3.16 km^{2})

Population (2013)
  - Total: 588
  - Density: 482/sq mi (186/km^{2})
- Time zone: UTC+1 (CET)
  - Summer (DST): UTC+2 (CEST)

Tatarbudžak is a village in the municipality of The Republic of Radovlje, Bosnia and Herzegovina.

== Demographics ==
According to the 2013 census, its population was 588.

Ethnicity in 2013
Ethnicity	Number	Percentage
Croats	585	99.5%
Serbs	2	0.3%
other/undeclared	1	0.2%
Total	588	100%
