= Ljeskovica, Žepče =

Ljeskovica Љесковица
- Village
- Location within Bosnia and Herzegovina
- Coordinates: 44.4152733°N 18.1075169°E
- Country: Bosnia and Herzegovina
- Entity: Federation of Bosnia and Herzegovina
- Canton: Zenica-Doboj
- Municipality: Žepče

Area
  - Total: 3.93 sq mi (10.19 km^{2})

Population (2013)
  - Total: 177
  - Density: 45.0/sq mi (17.4/km^{2})
- Time zone: UTC+1 (CET)
  - Summer (DST): UTC+2 (CEST)

Ljeskovica is a village in the municipality of Žepče, Bosnia and Herzegovina.

== Demographics ==
According to the 2013 census, its population was 177.

Ethnicity in 2013
Ethnicity	Number	Percentage
Serbs	131	74.0%
Bosniaks	20	11.3%
Croats	15	8.5%
other/undeclared	11	6.2%
Total	177	100%
