= Gornja Lovnica, Žepče =

Gornja Lovnica
- Village
- Location within Bosnia and Herzegovina
- Coordinates: 44.3886108°N 18.1237169°E
- Country: Bosnia and Herzegovina
- Entity: Federation of Bosnia and Herzegovina
- Canton: Zenica-Doboj
- Municipality: Žepče

Area
  - Total: 3.87 sq mi (10.03 km^{2})

Population (2013)
  - Total: 473
  - Density: 122/sq mi (47.2/km^{2})
- Time zone: UTC+1 (CET)
  - Summer (DST): UTC+2 (CEST)

Gornja Lovnica is a village in the municipality of Žepče, Bosnia and Herzegovina.

== Demographics ==
According to the 2013 census, its population was 473.

Ethnicity in 2013
Ethnicity	Number	Percentage
Croats	469	99.2%
Serbs	1	0.2%
other/undeclared	3	0.6%
Total	473	100%
