= Krsno Polje =

Village in Maglaj, Bosnia and Herzegovina

- Village
- Location within Bosnia and Herzegovina
- Country: Bosnia and Herzegovina
- Entity: Federation of Bosnia and Herzegovina
- Canton: Zenica-Doboj
- Municipality: Maglaj

Area
  - Total: 0.74 sq mi (1.92 km^{2})

Population (2013)
  - Total: 165
  - Density: 223/sq mi (85.9/km^{2})
- Time zone: UTC+1 (CET)
  - Summer (DST): UTC+2 (CEST)

Krsno Polje is a village in the municipality of Maglaj, Bosnia and Herzegovina.

== Demographics ==
According to the 2013 census, its population was 165.

Ethnicity in 2013
Ethnicity	Number	Percentage
Serbs	111	67.3%
Bosniaks	53	32.1%
other/undeclared	1	0.6%
Total	165	100%
