= Grabovica, Žepče =

Grabovica
- Village
- Location within Bosnia and Herzegovina
- Coordinates: 44°30′44″N 18°02′42″E
- Country: Bosnia and Herzegovina
- Entity: Federation of Bosnia and Herzegovina
- Canton: Zenica-Doboj
- Municipality: Žepče

Area
  - Total: 1.23 sq mi (3.19 km^{2})

Population (2013)
  - Total: 396
  - Density: 322/sq mi (124/km^{2})
- Time zone: UTC+1 (CET)
  - Summer (DST): UTC+2 (CEST)

Grabovica, Žepče is a village in the municipality of Žepče, Bosnia and Herzegovina.

== History ==
Prior to 2001 village was in Maglaj municipality.

== Demographics ==
According to the 2013 census, its population was 396, all Croats.
