= Čusto Brdo =

- Village
- Location within Bosnia and Herzegovina
- Country: Bosnia and Herzegovina
- Entity: Federation of Bosnia and Herzegovina
- Canton: Zenica-Doboj
- Municipality: Žepče

Area
  - Total: 1.17 sq mi (3.03 km^{2})

Population (2013)
  - Total: 296
  - Density: 253/sq mi (97.7/km^{2})
- Time zone: UTC+1 (CET)
  - Summer (DST): UTC+2 (CEST)

Čusto Brdo is a village in the municipality of Žepče, Bosnia and Herzegovina.

== Demographics ==
According to the 2013 census, its population was 296.

Ethnicity in 2013
Ethnicity	Number	Percentage
Croats	267	90.2%
Serbs	23	7.8%
Bosniaks	6	2.0%
Total	296	100%
