= Strupina (Maglaj) =

Village in Maglaj, Bosnia and Herzegovina

- Village
- Location within Bosnia and Herzegovina
- Coordinates: 44°31′41″N 18°02′04″E
- Country: Bosnia and Herzegovina
- Entity: Federation of Bosnia and Herzegovina
- Canton: Zenica-Doboj
- Municipality: Maglaj

Area
  - Total: 2.68 sq mi (6.95 km^{2})

Population (2013)
  - Total: 536
  - Density: 200/sq mi (77.1/km^{2})
- Time zone: UTC+1 (CET)
  - Summer (DST): UTC+2 (CEST)

Strupina is a village in the municipality of Maglaj, Zenica-Doboj Canton, Bosnia and Herzegovina.

== Demographics ==
According to the 2013 census, its population was 536.

Ethnicity in 2013
Ethnicity	Number	Percentage
Croats	367	68.5%
Bosniaks	168	31.3%
other/undeclared	1	0.2%
Total	536	100%
