= Radojčići (Maglaj) =

Village in Maglaj, Bosnia and Herzegovina

- Village
- Location within Bosnia and Herzegovina
- Country: Bosnia and Herzegovina
- Entity: Federation of Bosnia and Herzegovina
- Canton: Zenica-Doboj
- Municipality: Maglaj

Area
  - Total: 1.10 sq mi (2.85 km^{2})

Population (2013)
  - Total: 97
  - Density: 88/sq mi (34/km^{2})
- Time zone: UTC+1 (CET)
  - Summer (DST): UTC+2 (CEST)

Radojčići is a village in the municipality of Maglaj, Bosnia and Herzegovina.

== Demographics ==
According to the 2013 census, its population was 97.

Ethnicity in 2013
Ethnicity	Number	Percentage
Croats	47	48.5%
Serbs	37	38.1%
Bosniaks	13	13.4%
Total	97	100%
