= Oruče =

Village in Maglaj, Bosnia and Herzegovina

- Village
- Location within Bosnia and Herzegovina
- Coordinates: 44°34′N 18°03′E
- Country: Bosnia and Herzegovina
- Entity: Federation of Bosnia and Herzegovina
- Canton: Zenica-Doboj
- Municipality: Maglaj

Area
  - Total: 0.54 sq mi (1.39 km^{2})

Population (2013)
  - Total: 145
  - Density: 270/sq mi (104/km^{2})
- Time zone: UTC+1 (CET)
  - Summer (DST): UTC+2 (CEST)

Oruče is a village in the municipality of Maglaj, Bosnia and Herzegovina.

== Demographics ==
According to the 2013 census, its population was 145.

Ethnicity in 2013
Ethnicity	Number	Percentage
Bosniaks	140	96.6%
other/undeclared	5	3.4%
Total	145	100%
