= Donji Rakovac =

Village in Maglaj, Bosnia and Herzegovina

- Village
- Location within Bosnia and Herzegovina
- Country: Bosnia and Herzegovina
- Entity: Federation of Bosnia and Herzegovina
- Canton: Zenica-Doboj
- Municipality: Maglaj

Area
  - Total: 7.21 sq mi (18.68 km^{2})

Population (2013)
  - Total: 36
  - Density: 5.0/sq mi (1.9/km^{2})
- Time zone: UTC+1 (CET)
  - Summer (DST): UTC+2 (CEST)

Donji Rakovac is a village in the municipality of Maglaj, Bosnia and Herzegovina.

== Demographics ==
According to the 2013 census, its population was 36, all Serbs.
