= Rajnovo Brdo =

Village in Maglaj, Bosnia and Herzegovina

- Village
- Location within Bosnia and Herzegovina
- Coordinates: 44°32′25″N 18°17′06″E
- Country: Bosnia and Herzegovina
- Entity: Federation of Bosnia and Herzegovina
- Canton: Zenica-Doboj
- Municipality: Maglaj

Area
  - Total: 1.24 sq mi (3.20 km^{2})

Population (2013)
  - Total: 0
  - Density: 0.0/sq mi (0.0/km^{2})
- Time zone: UTC+1 (CET)
  - Summer (DST): UTC+2 (CEST)

Rajnovo Brdo is a village in the municipality of Maglaj, Bosnia and Herzegovina.

== Demographics ==
According to the 2013 census, its population was nil, down from 36 in 1991.
