= Ravne Gornje =

- Village
- Location within Bosnia and Herzegovina
- Coordinates: 44.4363515°N 18.0016231°E
- Country: Bosnia and Herzegovina
- Entity: Federation of Bosnia and Herzegovina
- Canton: Zenica-Doboj
- Municipality: Žepče

Area
  - Total: 0.72 sq mi (1.86 km^{2})

Population (2013)
  - Total: 188
  - Density: 262/sq mi (101/km^{2})
- Time zone: UTC+1 (CET)
  - Summer (DST): UTC+2 (CEST)

Ravne Gornje is a village in the municipality of Žepče, Bosnia and Herzegovina.

== Demographics ==
According to the 2013 census, its population was 188.

Ethnicity in 2013
Ethnicity	Number	Percentage
Croats	178	94.7%
Bosniaks	10	5.3%
Total	188	100%
