= Brankovići, Žepče =

Brankovići
- Village
- Location within Bosnia and Herzegovina
- Coordinates: 44.4892187°N 18.0701493°E
- Country: Bosnia and Herzegovina
- Entity: Federation of Bosnia and Herzegovina
- Canton: Zenica-Doboj
- Municipality: Žepče

Area
  - Total: 1.47 sq mi (3.82 km^{2})

Population (2013)
  - Total: 499
  - Density: 338/sq mi (131/km^{2})
- Time zone: UTC+1 (CET)
  - Summer (DST): UTC+2 (CEST)

Brankovići is a village in the municipality of Žepče, Bosnia and Herzegovina.

== Demographics ==
According to the 2013 census, its population was 499, all Croats.
