= Bradići Donji =

Village in Maglaj, Bosnia and Herzegovina

- Village
- Location within Bosnia and Herzegovina
- Coordinates: 44°30′N 18°08′E
- Country: Bosnia and Herzegovina
- Entity: Federation of Bosnia and Herzegovina
- Canton: Zenica-Doboj
- Municipality: Maglaj

Area
  - Total: 1.29 sq mi (3.34 km^{2})

Population (2013)
  - Total: 462
  - Density: 358/sq mi (138/km^{2})
- Time zone: UTC+1 (CET)
  - Summer (DST): UTC+2 (CEST)

Bradići Donji is a village in the municipality of Maglaj, Bosnia and Herzegovina.

== Demographics ==
According to the 2013 census, its population was 462.

Ethnicity in 2013
Ethnicity	Number	Percentage
Bosniaks	352	76.2%
Croats	103	22.3%
Serbs	0	0.0%
other/undeclared	7	1.5%
Total	462	100%
