= Vinište =

Vinište or Vinishte (Cyrillic: Виниште) may refer to the following places:

== Bulgaria ==
- Vinishte, Bulgaria

== Bosnia and Herzegovina ==
- Vinište (Konjic)
- Vinište, Žepče
