= Gornji Lug =

- Village
- Location within Bosnia and Herzegovina
- Coordinates: 44.4724542°N 18.0943965°E
- Country: Bosnia and Herzegovina
- Entity: Federation of Bosnia and Herzegovina
- Canton: Zenica-Doboj
- Municipality: Žepče

Area
  - Total: 1.00 sq mi (2.60 km^{2})

Population (2013)
  - Total: 613
  - Density: 611/sq mi (236/km^{2})
- Time zone: UTC+1 (CET)
  - Summer (DST): UTC+2 (CEST)

Gornji Lug is a village in the municipality of Žepče, Bosnia and Herzegovina.

== Demographics ==
According to the 2013 census, its population was 613.

Ethnicity in 2013
Ethnicity	Number	Percentage
Croats	329	53.7%
Bosniaks	284	46.3%
Total	613	100%
