= Bljuva =

- Village
- Location within Bosnia and Herzegovina
- Coordinates: 44.4413798°N 18.018307°E
- Country: Bosnia and Herzegovina
- Entity: Federation of Bosnia and Herzegovina
- Canton: Zenica-Doboj
- Municipality: Žepče

Area
  - Total: 0.80 sq mi (2.07 km^{2})

Population (2013)
  - Total: 129
  - Density: 161/sq mi (62.3/km^{2})
- Time zone: UTC+1 (CET)
  - Summer (DST): UTC+2 (CEST)

Bljuva is a village in the municipality of Žepče, Bosnia and Herzegovina.

== Demographics ==
According to the 2013 census, its population was 129.

Ethnicity in 2013
Ethnicity	Number	Percentage
Croats	126	97.7%
Serbs	3	2.3%
Total	129	100%
