= Donji Ulišnjak =

Village in Maglaj, Bosnia and Herzegovina

- Village
- Location within Bosnia and Herzegovina
- Coordinates: 44°32′N 18°07′E
- Country: Bosnia and Herzegovina
- Entity: Federation of Bosnia and Herzegovina
- Canton: Zenica-Doboj
- Municipality: Maglaj

Area
  - Total: 1.07 sq mi (2.76 km^{2})

Population (2013)
  - Total: 585
  - Density: 549/sq mi (212/km^{2})
- Time zone: UTC+1 (CET)
  - Summer (DST): UTC+2 (CEST)

Donji Ulišnjak is a village in the municipality of Maglaj, Bosnia and Herzegovina.

== Demographics ==
According to the 2013 census, its population was 585.

Ethnicity in 2013
Ethnicity	Number	Percentage
Bosniaks	577	98.6%
Serbs	2	0.3%
other/undeclared	6	1.0%
Total	585	100%
