= Ravne Donje =

- Village
- Location within Bosnia and Herzegovina
- Coordinates: 44.4291242°N 18.0039077°E
- Country: Bosnia and Herzegovina
- Entity: Federation of Bosnia and Herzegovina
- Canton: Zenica-Doboj
- Municipality: Žepče

Area
  - Total: 0.51 sq mi (1.33 km^{2})

Population (2013)
  - Total: 230
  - Density: 450/sq mi (170/km^{2})
- Time zone: UTC+1 (CET)
  - Summer (DST): UTC+2 (CEST)

Ravne Donje is a village in the municipality of Žepče, Bosnia and Herzegovina.

== Demographics ==
According to the 2013 census, its population was 230.

Ethnicity in 2013
Ethnicity	Number	Percentage
Croats	161	70.0%
Bosniaks	69	30.0%
Total	230	100%
