= Ljubna =

- Village
- Location within Bosnia and Herzegovina
- Coordinates: 44.4310599°N 17.9925788°E
- Country: Bosnia and Herzegovina
- Entity: Federation of Bosnia and Herzegovina
- Canton: Zenica-Doboj
- Municipality: Žepče

Area
  - Total: 2.29 sq mi (5.93 km^{2})

Population (2013)
  - Total: 246
  - Density: 107/sq mi (41.5/km^{2})
- Time zone: UTC+1 (CET)
  - Summer (DST): UTC+2 (CEST)

Ljubna is a village in the municipality of Žepče, Bosnia and Herzegovina.

== Demographics ==
According to the 2013 census, its population was 246.

Ethnicity in 2013
Ethnicity	Number	Percentage
Croats	244	99.2%
Bosniaks	2	0.8%
Total	246	100%
