= Domislica =

Village in Maglaj, Bosnia and Herzegovina

- Village
- Location within Bosnia and Herzegovina
- Coordinates: 44°31′N 18°00′E
- Country: Bosnia and Herzegovina
- Entity: Federation of Bosnia and Herzegovina
- Canton: Zenica-Doboj
- Municipality: Maglaj
- Established: 14. Century

Area
  - Total: 0.50 sq mi (1.30 km^{2})

Population (2013)
  - Total: 679
  - Density: 1,350/sq mi (522/km^{2})
- Time zone: UTC+1 (CET)
  - Summer (DST): UTC+2 (CEST)
- Postal code: 74250 Maglaj

Domislica is a village in the municipality of Maglaj, Bosnia and Herzegovina.

== Demographics ==
According to the 2013 census, its population was 679.

Ethnicity in 2013
Ethnicity	Number	Percentage
Bosniaks	651	95.9%
Croats	25	3.7%
other/undeclared	3	0.4%
Total	679	100%
