= Goliješnica =

- Village
- Location within Bosnia and Herzegovina
- Coordinates: 44.4722526°N 18.0539703°E
- Country: Bosnia and Herzegovina
- Entity: Federation of Bosnia and Herzegovina
- Canton: Zenica-Doboj
- Municipality: Žepče

Area
  - Total: 2.26 sq mi (5.85 km^{2})

Population (2013)
  - Total: 925
  - Density: 410/sq mi (158/km^{2})
- Time zone: UTC+1 (CET)
  - Summer (DST): UTC+2 (CEST)

Goliješnica is a village in the municipality of Žepče, Bosnia and Herzegovina.

== Demographics ==
According to the 2013 census, its population was 925.

Ethnicity in 2013
Ethnicity	Number	Percentage
Croats	924	99.9%
other/undeclared	1	0.1%
Total	925	100%
