= Gornja Golubinja =

- Village
- Location within Bosnia and Herzegovina
- Coordinates: 44.3609222°N 17.9713583°E
- Country: Bosnia and Herzegovina
- Entity: Federation of Bosnia and Herzegovina
- Canton: Zenica-Doboj
- Municipality: Žepče

Area
  - Total: 3.02 sq mi (7.83 km^{2})

Population (2013)
  - Total: 399
  - Density: 132/sq mi (51.0/km^{2})
- Time zone: UTC+1 (CET)
  - Summer (DST): UTC+2 (CEST)

Gornja Golubinja is a village in the municipality of Žepče, Bosnia and Herzegovina. Po nekim podatcima po imenu seoskih parcela, poput podataka naziva Seliste, vjeruje se da je selo jos nastalo oko 1200-te godine, prije dolaska Osmanlija. Osmanlije su bile poznate da nisu davale takva imena. S Toga, se vjeruje da su prvi stanovnici bili pripadnici tzv. Crkve bosanske. U to vrijeme je bilo normalno da se ljudi takodjer kopaju negdje drugo. Najcese nedaleko od sela 2-3 kilometra. A dokazi za to su najbolji postojanje stećaka. Ta grupacija ljudi prije dolaska osmanlija zivjela je u blizini voda i suma. Selo Se Tako razvijalo Nakon Sto su se dodjeljivala zemljista po cijelom selu. Najbolji dokazi da su u selu po prezimenima Alickovic jedno od najstarijih porodica. Prezime Alickovic dolazi od rijeci Alija-ic, Takodjer preovladavaju druga prezimena poput Halilovic; Halil-ic, Sculic, Krehmic, Seherac, Becic, Mandzuka, Prasko, Osmic; Osman. Selo ima najbolji dokaz da su to nekada bila braca i te je bilo zabrsnjeno udavanje i sirenje porodice ispod 7 generacije, Jer se znalo da je to Ista krv. Prije pocetka 1. svjetskog rata, selo je zadesilo kuga. Gdje se dosta doseljenika doselilo zivjelo bosansko-hrvatske nacionalsti, vjernici katolicke crkve. Kao dokazi duboko u sumama nedaleko 2-3 kilometra od sela. Prezimena Osmic, Alickovic, Halilovic, Sculic, navodno su od iste brace nastala: Alija, Osman, Hali, mujicic - Mujo. itd. Jedina doseljenicka prezimena koja su zanimljiva bila su Seherac I Krehmic. Po istrazivanju navodi se da su to doseljenicka przimena u osmanskom periodu. - pise Edvin Alickovic

== Demographics ==
According to the 2013 census, its population was 399.

Ethnicity in 2013
Ethnicity	Number	Percentage
Bosniaks	oko 60 stanovnika ,	100%
Croats		
Serbs		
other/undeclared		
Total	60	100%

Stanovnistvo sela po popisu i procjeni brojo u godini 2026, broji oko nekih 60ak ljudi I ukupno ono 30 domacinstava. Dosta je Mladih ljudi odselilo u inostranstvo Kao i ruralne podrucje. -pise Edvin Alickovic
