= Vitlaci =

- Village
- Location within Bosnia and Herzegovina
- Coordinates: 44.4493929°N 17.986674°E
- Country: Bosnia and Herzegovina
- Entity: Federation of Bosnia and Herzegovina
- Canton: Zenica-Doboj
- Municipality: Žepče

Area
  - Total: 1.95 sq mi (5.04 km^{2})

Population (2013)
  - Total: 256
  - Density: 132/sq mi (50.8/km^{2})
- Time zone: UTC+1 (CET)
  - Summer (DST): UTC+2 (CEST)

Vitlaci is a village in the municipality of Žepče, Bosnia and Herzegovina.

== Demographics ==
According to the 2013 census, its population was 256.

Ethnicity in 2013
Ethnicity	Number	Percentage
Bosniaks	190	74.2%
Croats	65	25.4%
other/undeclared	1	0.4%
Total	256	100%
