= Liješnica =

Village in Maglaj, Bosnia and Herzegovina

- Village
- Location within Bosnia and Herzegovina
- Coordinates: 44°30′N 18°04′E
- Country: Bosnia and Herzegovina
- Entity: Federation of Bosnia and Herzegovina
- Canton: Zenica-Doboj
- Municipality: Maglaj

Area
  - Total: 2.53 sq mi (6.54 km^{2})

Population (2013)
  - Total: 1,576
  - Density: 624/sq mi (241/km^{2})
- Time zone: UTC+1 (CET)
  - Summer (DST): UTC+2 (CEST)

Liješnica is a village in the municipality of Maglaj, Bosnia and Herzegovina.

== Demographics ==
According to the 2013 census, its population was 1,576.

Ethnicity in 2013
| Ethnicity | Number | Percentage |
|---|---|---|
| Bosniaks | 1,445 | 91.7% |
| Croats | 121 | 7.7% |
| other/undeclared | 10 | 0.6% |
| Total | 1,576 | 100% |
