= Bijela Ploča =

Village in Maglaj, Bosnia and Herzegovina

- Village
- Location within Bosnia and Herzegovina
- Coordinates: 44°34′N 18°06′E
- Country: Bosnia and Herzegovina
- Entity: Federation of Bosnia and Herzegovina
- Canton: Zenica-Doboj
- Municipality: Maglaj

Area
  - Total: 0.62 sq mi (1.61 km^{2})

Population (2013)
  - Total: 616
  - Density: 991/sq mi (383/km^{2})
- Time zone: UTC+1 (CET)
  - Summer (DST): UTC+2 (CEST)

Bijela Ploča is a village in the municipality of Maglaj, Bosnia and Herzegovina.

== Demographics ==
According to the 2013 census, its population was 616.

Ethnicity in 2013
Ethnicity	Number	Percentage
Bosniaks	580	94.2%
Serbs	27	4.4%
Croats	2	0.3%
other/undeclared	7	1.1%
Total	616	100%
