= Želeće =

- Village
- Location within Bosnia and Herzegovina
- Coordinates: 44.3959808°N 17.9959302°E
- Country: Bosnia and Herzegovina
- Entity: Federation of Bosnia and Herzegovina
- Canton: Zenica-Doboj
- Municipality: Žepče

Area
  - Total: 6.38 sq mi (16.53 km^{2})

Population (2013)
  - Total: 204
  - Density: 32.0/sq mi (12.3/km^{2})
- Time zone: UTC+1 (CET)
  - Summer (DST): UTC+2 (CEST)

Želeće is a village in the municipality of Žepče, Bosnia and Herzegovina.

== Demographics ==
According to the 2013 census, its population was 204.

Ethnicity in 2013
Ethnicity	Number	Percentage
Bosniaks	119	58.3%
Serbs	80	39.2%
Croats	5	2.5%
Total	204	100%
