= Bradići Gornji =

Village in Maglaj, Bosnia and Herzegovina

- Village
- Location within Bosnia and Herzegovina
- Coordinates: 44°31′N 18°10′E
- Country: Bosnia and Herzegovina
- Entity: Federation of Bosnia and Herzegovina
- Canton: Zenica-Doboj
- Municipality: Maglaj

Area
  - Total: 1.06 sq mi (2.74 km^{2})

Population (2013)
  - Total: 430
  - Density: 410/sq mi (160/km^{2})
- Time zone: UTC+1 (CET)
  - Summer (DST): UTC+2 (CEST)

Bradići Gornji is a village in the municipality of Maglaj, Bosnia and Herzegovina.

== Demographics ==
According to the 2013 census, its population was 430.

Ethnicity in 2013
Ethnicity	Number	Percentage
Bosniaks	304	70.7%
Croats	126	29.3%
Total	430	100%
