= Čobe =

Village in Maglaj, Bosnia and Herzegovina

- Village
- Location within Bosnia and Herzegovina
- Coordinates: 44°08′N 18°09′E
- Country: Bosnia and Herzegovina
- Entity: Federation of Bosnia and Herzegovina
- Canton: Zenica-Doboj
- Municipality: Maglaj

Area
  - Total: 2.03 sq mi (5.27 km^{2})

Population (2013)
  - Total: 635
  - Density: 312/sq mi (120/km^{2})
- Time zone: UTC+1 (CET)
  - Summer (DST): UTC+2 (CEST)

Čobe is a village in the municipality of Maglaj, Bosnia and Herzegovina.

== Demographics ==
According to the 2013 census, its population was 635.

Ethnicity in 2013
Ethnicity	Number	Percentage
Bosniaks	632	99.5%
other/undeclared	3	0.5%
Total	635	100%
