= Galovac, Maglaj =

Village in Maglaj, Bosnia and Herzegovina

Galovac
- Village
- Location within Bosnia and Herzegovina
- Coordinates: 44.5136672°N 18.0490981°E
- Country: Bosnia and Herzegovina
- Entity: Federation of Bosnia and Herzegovina
- Canton: Zenica-Doboj
- Municipality: Maglaj

Area
  - Total: 0.68 sq mi (1.75 km^{2})

Population (2013)
  - Total: 147
  - Density: 218/sq mi (84.0/km^{2})
- Time zone: UTC+1 (CET)
  - Summer (DST): UTC+2 (CEST)

Galovac is a village in the municipality of Maglaj, Bosnia and Herzegovina.

== Demographics ==
According to the 2013 census, its population was 147.

Ethnicity in 2013
Ethnicity	Number	Percentage
Croats	138	93.9%
Bosniaks	9	6.1%
Total	147	100%
