= Globarica =

- Village
- Location within Bosnia and Herzegovina
- Coordinates: 44°30′N 18°10′E
- Country: Bosnia and Herzegovina
- Entity: Federation of Bosnia and Herzegovina
- Canton: Zenica-Doboj
- Municipality: Žepče

Area
  - Total: 2.03 sq mi (5.27 km^{2})

Population (2013)
  - Total: 637
  - Density: 313/sq mi (121/km^{2})
- Time zone: UTC+1 (CET)
  - Summer (DST): UTC+2 (CEST)

Globarica is a village in the municipality of Žepče, Bosnia and Herzegovina.

== Demographics ==
According to the 2013 census, its population was 637.

Ethnicity in 2013
Ethnicity	Number	Percentage
Croats	630	98.9%
Bosniaks	4	0.6%
Serbs	1	0.2%
other/undeclared	2	0.3%
Total	637	100%
