= Ljubatovići =

- Village
- Location within Bosnia and Herzegovina
- Coordinates: 44°30′N 18°03′E
- Country: Bosnia and Herzegovina
- Entity: Federation of Bosnia and Herzegovina
- Canton: Zenica-Doboj
- Municipality: Žepče

Area
  - Total: 1.32 sq mi (3.42 km^{2})

Population (2013)
  - Total: 502
  - Density: 380/sq mi (147/km^{2})
- Time zone: UTC+1 (CET)
  - Summer (DST): UTC+2 (CEST)

Ljubatovići is a village in the municipality of Žepče, Bosnia and Herzegovina.

== Demographics ==
According to the 2013 census, its population was 502.

Ethnicity in 2013
Ethnicity	Number	Percentage
Croats	373	74.3%
Bosniaks	129	25.7%
Total	502	100%
