= Donji Lug =

- Village
- Location within Bosnia and Herzegovina
- Coordinates: 44.4792679°N 18.0810498°E
- Country: Bosnia and Herzegovina
- Entity: Federation of Bosnia and Herzegovina
- Canton: Zenica-Doboj
- Municipality: Žepče

Area
  - Total: 0.74 sq mi (1.91 km^{2})

Population (2013)
  - Total: 528
  - Density: 716/sq mi (276/km^{2})
- Time zone: UTC+1 (CET)
  - Summer (DST): UTC+2 (CEST)

Donji Lug is a village in the municipality of Žepče, Bosnia and Herzegovina.

== Demographics ==
According to the 2013 census, its population was 528.

Ethnicity in 2013
Ethnicity	Number	Percentage
Croats	527	99.8%
Serbs	1	0.2%
Total	528	100%
