= Pire, Žepče =

Pire
- Village
- Location within Bosnia and Herzegovina
- Coordinates: 44°29′35″N 18°00′42″E
- Country: Bosnia and Herzegovina
- Entity: Federation of Bosnia and Herzegovina
- Canton: Zenica-Doboj
- Municipality: Žepče

Area
  - Total: 1.38 sq mi (3.57 km^{2})

Population (2013)
  - Total: 338
  - Density: 245/sq mi (94.7/km^{2})
- Time zone: UTC+1 (CET)
  - Summer (DST): UTC+2 (CEST)

Pire is a village in the Žepče municipality, Zenica-Doboj Canton, Federation of Bosnia and Herzegovina, Bosnia and Herzegovina.

== History ==
Until 2001 village Pire was part of the Maglaj municipality.

== Demographics ==
According to the 2013 census, its population was 338, all Croats.
