= Komšići =

- Village
- Location within Bosnia and Herzegovina
- Coordinates: 44°30′36″N 18°05′50″E
- Country: Bosnia and Herzegovina
- Entity: Federation of Bosnia and Herzegovina
- Canton: Zenica-Doboj
- Municipality: Žepče

Area
  - Total: 1.54 sq mi (3.99 km^{2})

Population (2013)
  - Total: 147
  - Density: 95.4/sq mi (36.8/km^{2})
- Time zone: UTC+1 (CET)
  - Summer (DST): UTC+2 (CEST)

Komšići is a village in the municipality of Žepče, Bosnia and Herzegovina.

== Demographics ==
According to the 2013 census, its population was 147.

Ethnicity in 2013
Ethnicity	Number	Percentage
Croats	146	99.3%
other/undeclared	1	0.7%
Total	147	100%
