= Osova =

- Village
- Location within Bosnia and Herzegovina
- Coordinates: 44.4471383°N 18.0852556°E
- Country: Bosnia and Herzegovina
- Entity: Federation of Bosnia and Herzegovina
- Canton: Zenica-Doboj
- Municipality: Žepče

Area
  - Total: 1.71 sq mi (4.44 km^{2})

Population (2013)
  - Total: 441
  - Density: 257/sq mi (99.3/km^{2})
- Time zone: UTC+1 (CET)
  - Summer (DST): UTC+2 (CEST)

Osova is a village in the municipality of Žepče, Bosnia and Herzegovina.

== Demographics ==
According to the 2013 census, its population was 441, all Croats.
