= Vinište, Žepče =

Vinište
- Village
- Location within Bosnia and Herzegovina
- Coordinates: 44.4294242°N 18.0980889°E
- Country: Bosnia and Herzegovina
- Entity: Federation of Bosnia and Herzegovina
- Canton: Zenica-Doboj
- Municipality: Žepče

Area
  - Total: 1.91 sq mi (4.94 km^{2})

Population (2013)
  - Total: 845
  - Density: 443/sq mi (171/km^{2})
- Time zone: UTC+1 (CET)
  - Summer (DST): UTC+2 (CEST)

Vinište is a village in the municipality of Žepče, Bosnia and Herzegovina.

== Demographics ==
According to the 2013 census, its population was 845.

Ethnicity in 2013
Ethnicity	Number	Percentage
Croats	841	99.5%
Serbs	2	0.2%
other/undeclared	2	0.2%
Total	845	100%
