= Adže =

- Village
- Location within Bosnia and Herzegovina
- Coordinates: 44.5025°N 17.9987°E
- Country: Bosnia and Herzegovina
- Entity: Federation of Bosnia and Herzegovina
- Canton: Zenica-Doboj
- Municipality: Žepče

Area
  - Total: 2.35 sq mi (6.09 km^{2})

Population (2013)
  - Total: 358
  - Density: 152/sq mi (58.8/km^{2})
- Time zone: UTC+1 (CET)
  - Summer (DST): UTC+2 (CEST)

Adže is a village in the municipality of Žepče, Bosnia and Herzegovina.

== Demographics ==
According to the 2013 census, its population was 358.

Ethnicity in 2013
Ethnicity	Number	Percentage
Croats	350	97.8%
Bosniaks	7	2.0%
Serbs	1	0.3%
other/undeclared	1	0.3%
Total	358	100%
