= Novi Šeher =

Village in Maglaj, Bosnia and Herzegovina

- Village
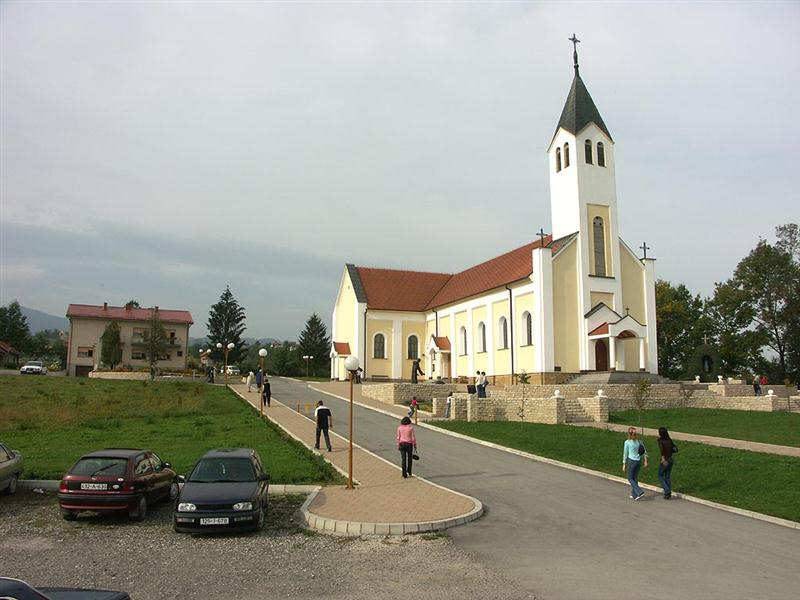

- Location within Bosnia and Herzegovina
- Coordinates: 44°31′N 18°02′E
- Country: Bosnia and Herzegovina
- Entity: Federation of Bosnia and Herzegovina
- Canton: Zenica-Doboj
- Municipality: Maglaj

Area
  - Total: 1.37 sq mi (3.55 km^{2})

Population (2013)
  - Total: 1,495
  - Density: 1,090/sq mi (421/km^{2})
- Time zone: UTC+1 (CET)
  - Summer (DST): UTC+2 (CEST)

Novi Šeher is a village in the municipality of Maglaj, Bosnia and Herzegovina.

== Demographics ==
According to the 2013 census, its population was 1,495.

Ethnicity in 2013
Ethnicity	Number	Percentage
Bosniaks	1,246	83.3%
Croats	236	15.8%
other/undeclared	13	0.9%
Total	1,495	100%
