= Radunice =

- Village
- Location within Bosnia and Herzegovina
- Coordinates: 44°29′N 18°08′E
- Country: Bosnia and Herzegovina
- Entity: Federation of Bosnia and Herzegovina
- Canton: Zenica-Doboj
- Municipality: Žepče

Area
  - Total: 3.22 sq mi (8.33 km^{2})

Population (2013)
  - Total: 312
  - Density: 97.0/sq mi (37.5/km^{2})
- Time zone: UTC+1 (CET)
  - Summer (DST): UTC+2 (CEST)

Radunice is a village in the municipality of Žepče, Bosnia and Herzegovina.

== Demographics ==
According to the 2013 census, its population was 312.

Ethnicity in 2013
Ethnicity	Number	Percentage
Croats	309	99.0%
Serbs	2	0.6%
other/undeclared	1	0.3%
Total	312	100%
