= Matina, Bosnia and Herzegovina =

Matina
- Village
- Location within Bosnia and Herzegovina
- Coordinates: 44°28′54″N 18°01′25″E
- Country: Bosnia and Herzegovina
- Entity: Federation of Bosnia and Herzegovina
- Canton: Zenica-Doboj
- Municipality: Žepče

Area
  - Total: 2.03 sq mi (5.25 km^{2})

Population (2013)
  - Total: 497
  - Density: 245/sq mi (94.7/km^{2})
- Time zone: UTC+1 (CET)
  - Summer (DST): UTC+2 (CEST)

Matina (Maglaj) is a village in the municipality of Žepče, Zenica-Doboj Canton, Federation of Bosnia and Herzegovina, Bosnia and Herzegovina.

== Demographics ==
According to the 2013 census, its population was 497.

Ethnicity in 2013
Ethnicity	Number	Percentage
Croats	492	99.0%
Serbs	3	0.6%
other/undeclared	2	0.4%
Total	497	100%
