= Žepče =

Town and municipality in Bosnia and Herzegovina

Žepče Жепче
- Town and municipality
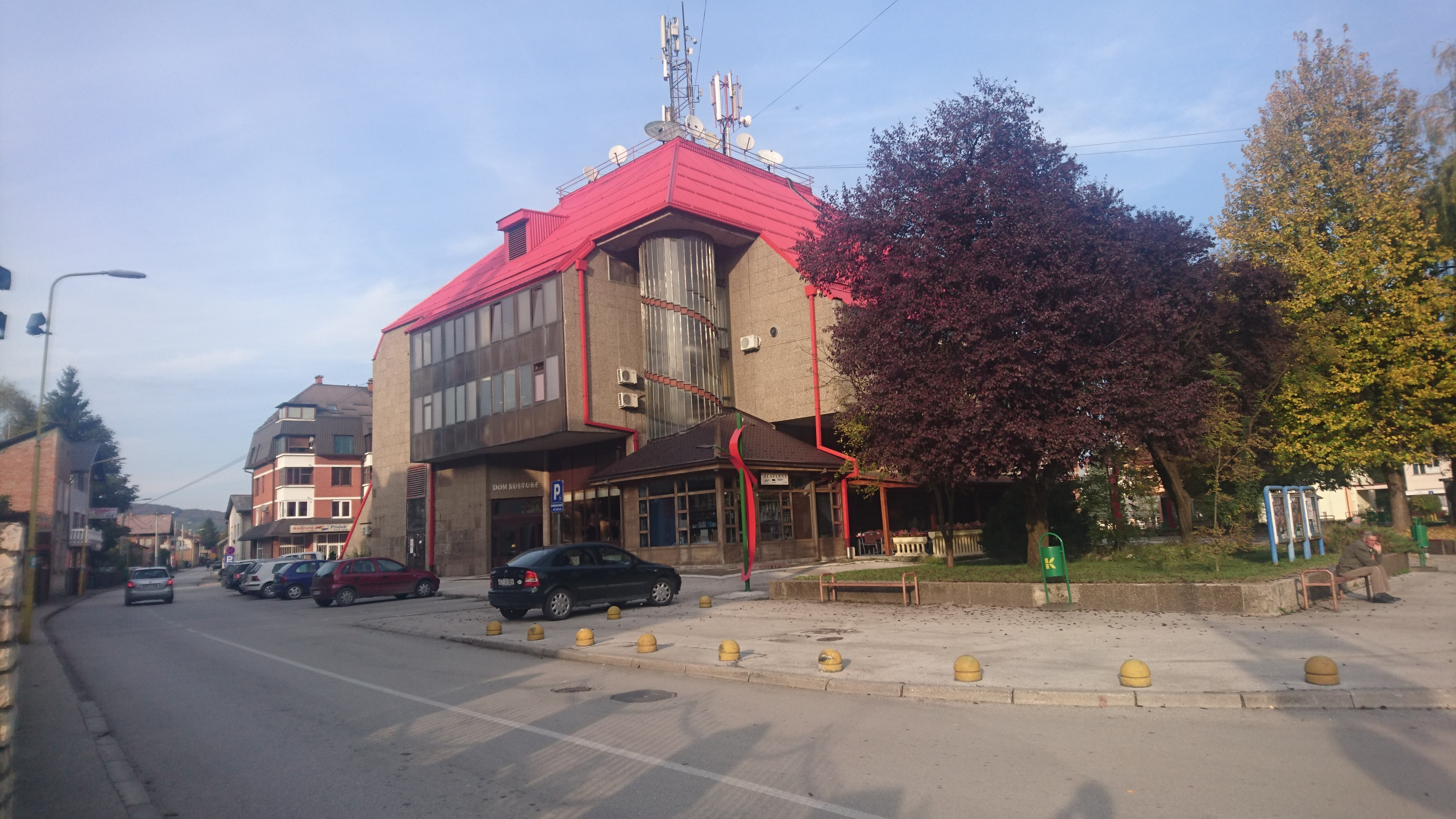
- House of Culture in Žepče

- Flag Coat of arms

- Location of Žepče within Bosnia and Herzegovina.

- Location within Bosnia and Herzegovina
- Coordinates: 44°26′N 18°02′E
- Country: Bosnia and Herzegovina
- Entity: Federation of Bosnia and Herzegovina
- Canton: Zenica-Doboj

Government
  - Municipal mayor: Mato Zovko (HDZ BiH)

Area
  - Total: 282 km^{2} (109 sq mi)

Population (2013 census)
  - Total: 31,582
  - Density: 112/km^{2} (290/sq mi)
- Time zone: UTC+1 (CET)
  - Summer (DST): UTC+2 (CEST)
- Area code: +387 32
- Website: www.opcina-zepce.com

Žepče (Serbian Cyrillic: Жепче) is a town and municipality located in Zenica-Doboj Canton of the Federation of Bosnia and Herzegovina, an entity of Bosnia and Herzegovina. It is situated in central Bosnia and Herzegovina, between Doboj and Zenica. As of 2013, it has a population of 30,219 inhabitants.

The river Bosna flows through this city. Near within the town, there are 14 mineral water springs. Žepče is within the vicinity of the Lasva valley and thus is surrounded by mountains.

== History ==
The town was first mentioned in 1458 in a charter issued by the Bosnian king Stjepan Tomašević, "... Pissanna Žepču va ljetu 1458. oktombrija 14. dan." (Written in Žepče in the year 1458. 14.day of October)

The city would see combat during the Bosnian War, as HVO forces would launch an operation against ARBiH over complete control of the city on the 24th of June, 1993. After the Dayton Agreement in 1995, the city would end up becoming a part of the Federation of Bosnia and Herzegovina, as part of the Zenica-Doboj Canton.

== Demographics ==
In 2001 the following Croat villages from the municipalities of Maglaj and Zavidovići merged with the municipality of Žepče to form one entity with Croat majority: Adže, Pire, Ponijevo, Matina, Ljubatovići, Grabovica, Čusto Brdo, Komšići, Radunice, Globarica, Brankovići, Donji Lug, Gornji Lug, Vrbica, Debelo Brdo, Osova, Vinište and Gornja Lovnica.

=== Population ===
Population of settlements – Žepče municipality
	Settlement	1961.	1971.	1981.	1991.	2013.
	Total	13,924	16,906	19,754	22,966	31,582
1	Adže				414	358
2	Begov Han				1,041	1,299
3	Bistrica				1,192	978
4	Brankovići				547	499
5	Čusto Brdo				322	296
6	Donji Lug				504	528
7	Globarica				823	637
8	Goliješnica				798	925
9	Golubinja				398	363
10	Gornja Golubinja				483	399
11	Gornja Lovnica				721	473
12	Gornji Lug				509	613
13	Grabovica				411	396
14	Ljubatovići				564	502
15	Ljubna				176	246
16	Lupoglav				869	844
17	Matina				501	497
18	Mračaj				687	562
19	Orahovica				1,295	929
20	Osova				561	441
21	Ozimica				1,546	1,431
23	Papratnica				1,130	1,192
24	Pire				384	338
25	Ponijevo				775	864
26	Radunice				601	312
27	Ravne Donje				141	230
28	Tatarbudžak				571	588
29	Vašarište				327	566
30	Vinište				1,061	845
31	Vitlaci				339	256
32	Vrbica				600	400
33	Želeće				410	204
34	Željezno Polje				4,384	4,791
35	Žepče	2,709	3,209	4,257	5,571	5,460

=== Ethnic composition ===
Ethnic composition – Žepče town
	2013.	1991.	1981.	1971.	1961.
Total	5,460 (100,0%)	5,571 (100,0%)	4,257 (100,0%)	3,209 (100,0%)	2,709 (100,0%)
Bosniaks	2,696 (49,38%)	3,367 (60,44%)	2,337 (54,90%)	2,242 (69,87%)	1,312 (48.43%)
Croats	2,591 (47,45%)	1,450 (26,03%)	935 (21,96%)	637 (19,85%)	461 (17.02%)
Serbs	82 (1,502%)	270 (4,847%)	252 (5,920%)	227 (7,074%)	349 (12.88%)
Others	82 (1,502%)	103 (1,849%)	71 (1,668%)	31 (0,966%)	32 (1.18%)
Albanians	5 (0,092%)		7 (0,164%)	6 (0,187%)	
Montenegrins	4 (0,073%)		11 (0,258%)	22 (0,686%)	
Yugoslavs		381 (6,839%)	640 (15,03%)	33 (1,028%)	555 (20.49%)
Macedonians			2 (0,047%)	4 (0,125%)	
Slovenes			2 (0,047%)	7 (0,218%)	

Ethnic composition – Žepče municipality
	2013.	1991.	1981.	1971.	1961.
Total	31,582 (100,0%)	22,966 (100,0%)	19,754 (100,0%)	16,906 (100,0%)	13,924 (100,0%)
Croats	17,801 (58,91%)	9,100 (39,62%)	7,813 (39,55%)	7,174 (42,43%)	5,978 (42.93%)
Bosniaks	11,727 (38,81%)	10,820 (47,11%)	8,769 (44,39%)	7,531 (44,55%)	5,038 (36.18%)
Serbs	501 (1,658%)	2,278 (9,919%)	2,004 (10,14%)	2,028 (12,00%)	2,033 (14.60%)
Others	190 (0,629%)	222 (0,967%)	187 (0,947%)	68 (0,402%)	54 (0.39%)
Yugoslavs		546 (2,377%)	933 (4,723%)	56 (0,331%)	821 (5.90%)
Montenegrins			25 (0,127%)	32 (0,189%)	
Albanians			14 (0,071%)	6 (0,035%)	
Macedonians			7 (0,035%)	4 (0,024%)	
Slovenes			2 (0,010%)	7 (0,041%)	

== Sport ==
The town is home to local football club NK Žepče.

== Notable people ==
- Ivica Marić, basketball player
- Abdulvehab Ilhamija, poet and prose writer
- Emir Preldžić, basketball player
- Nedžad Ibrišimović, writer

== Gallery ==
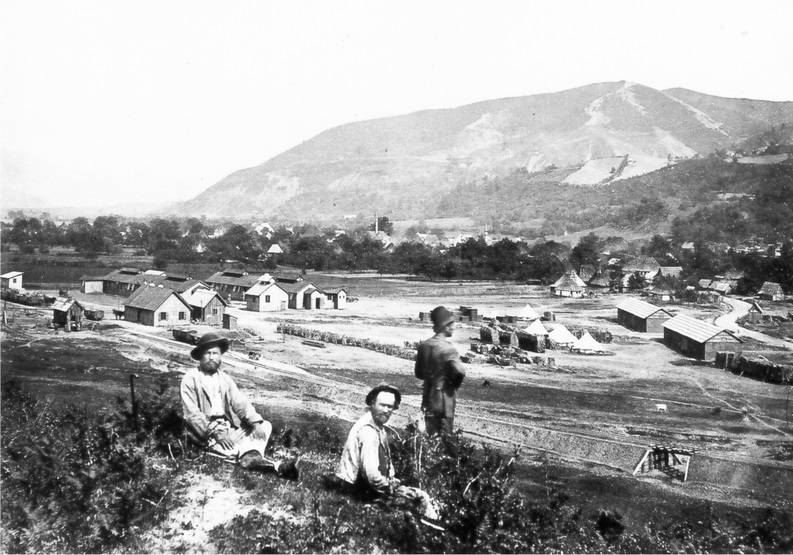
Construction of the railway line (1879)

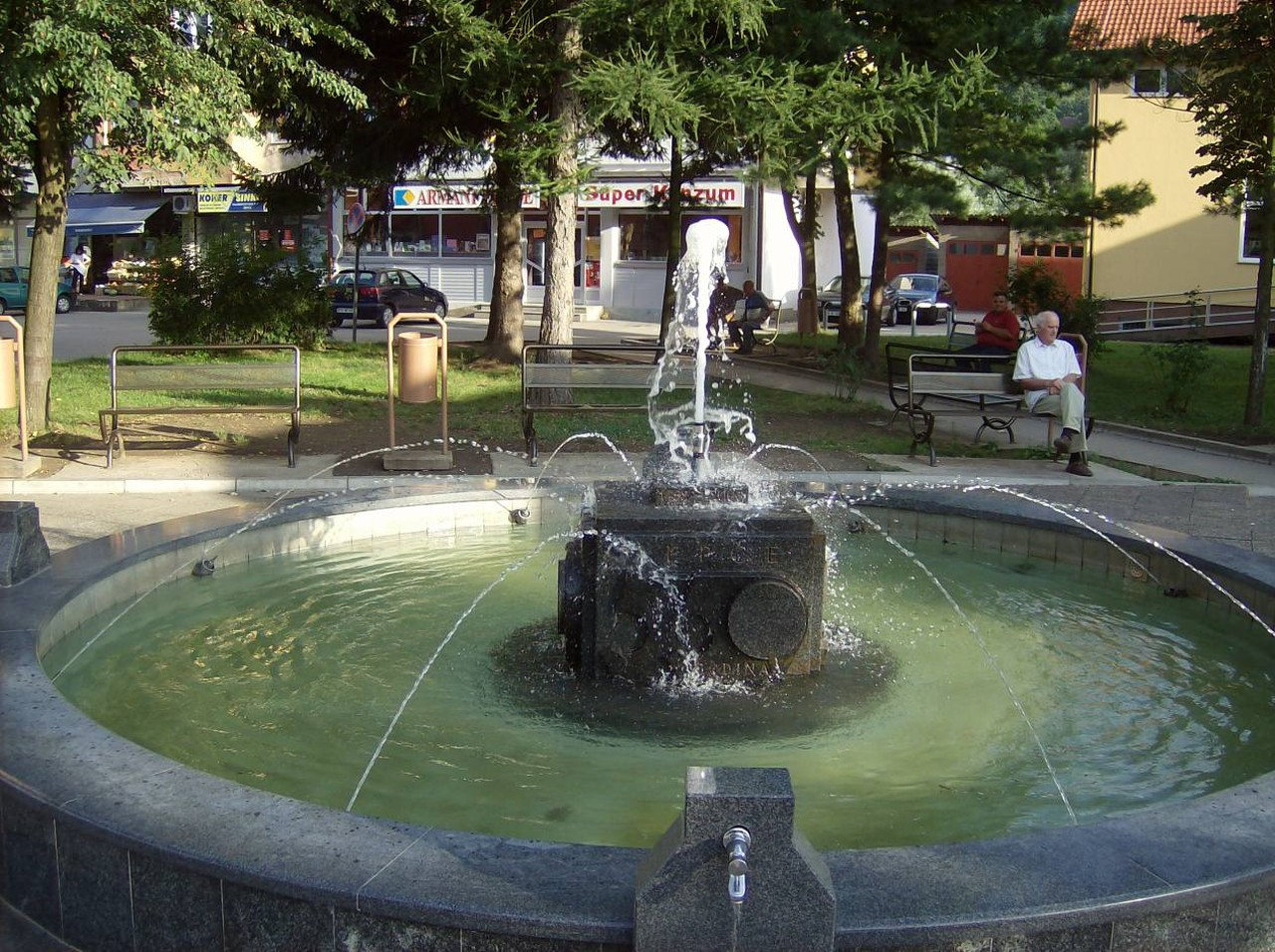
Garden Fountain

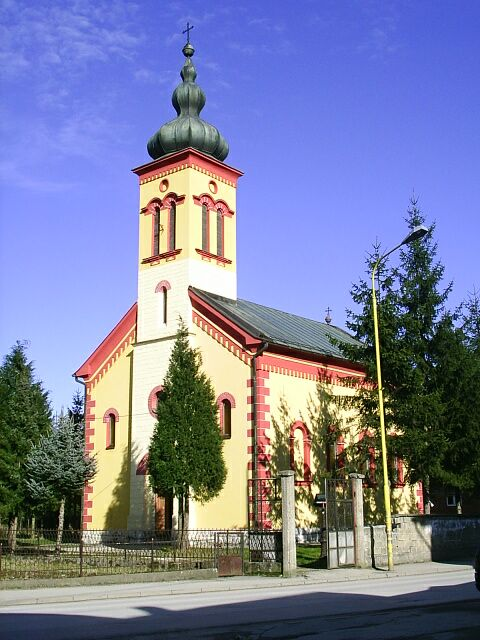
Orthodox Church

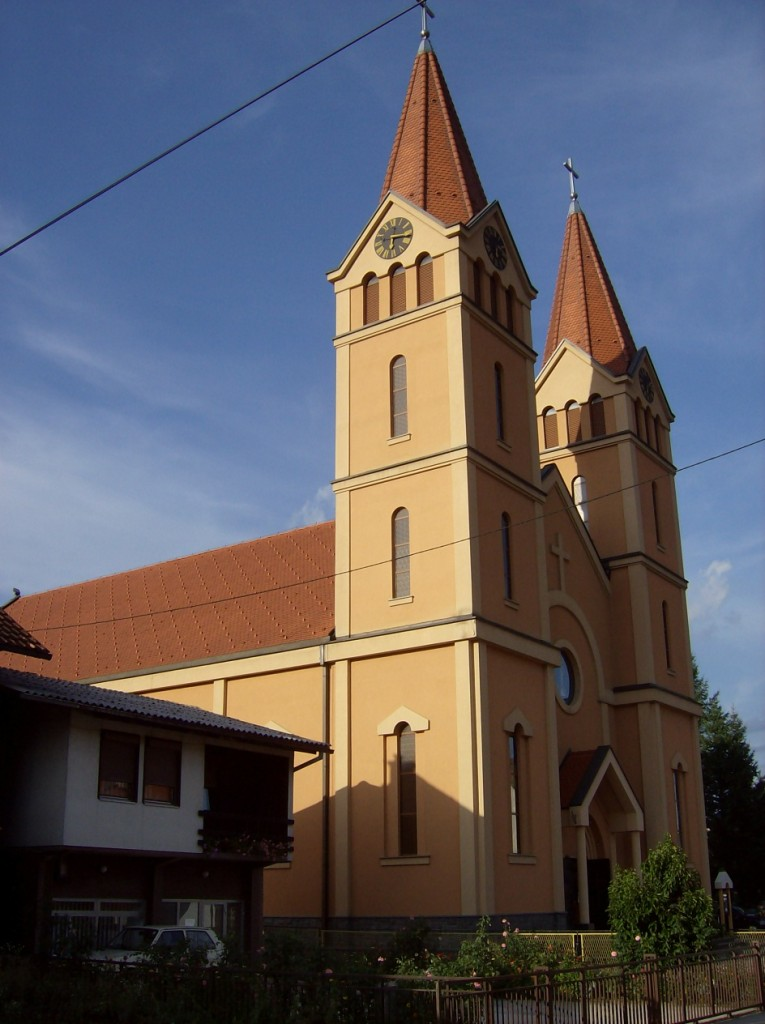
Church of St.Anthony of Padua

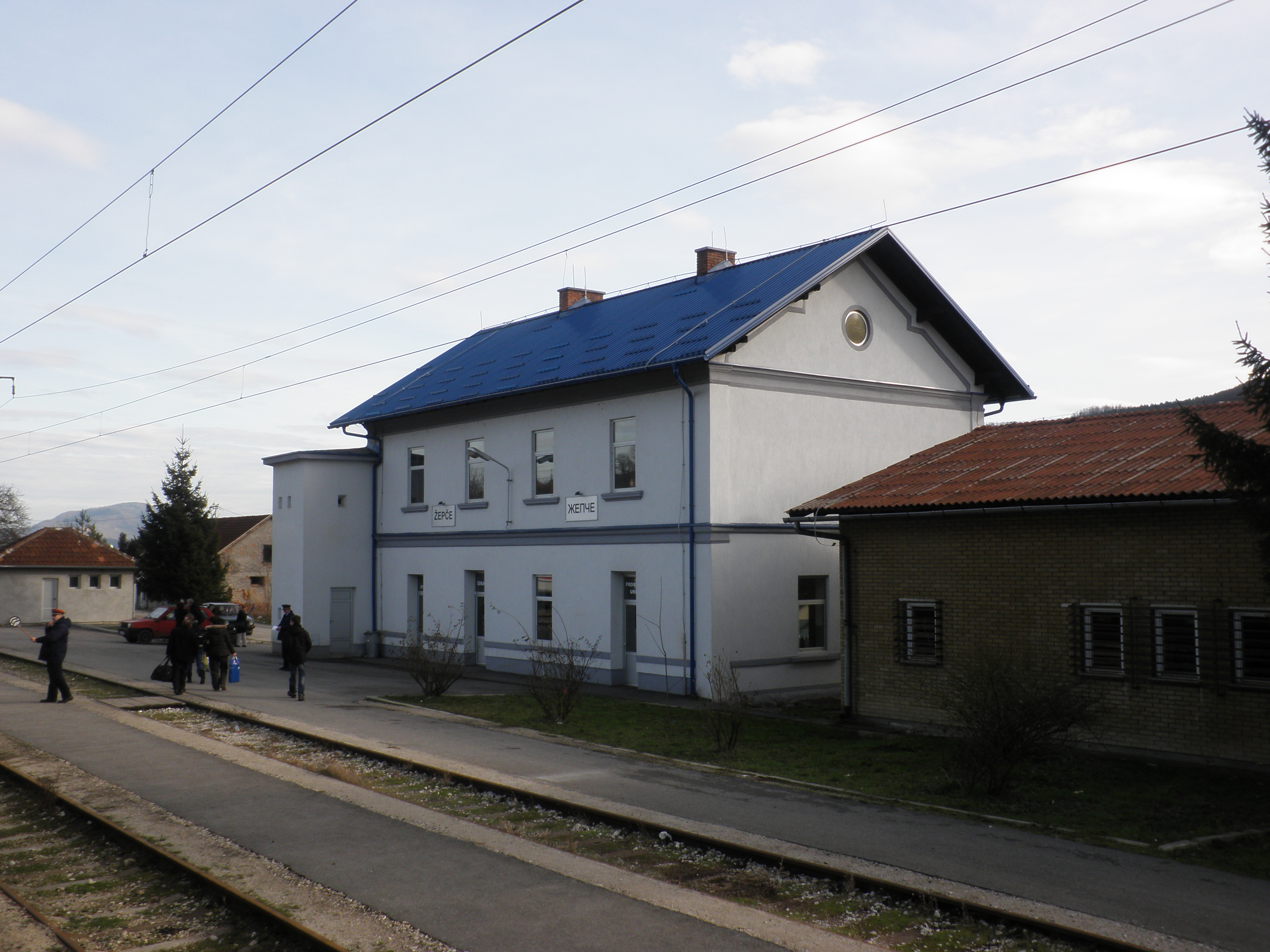
Railway station

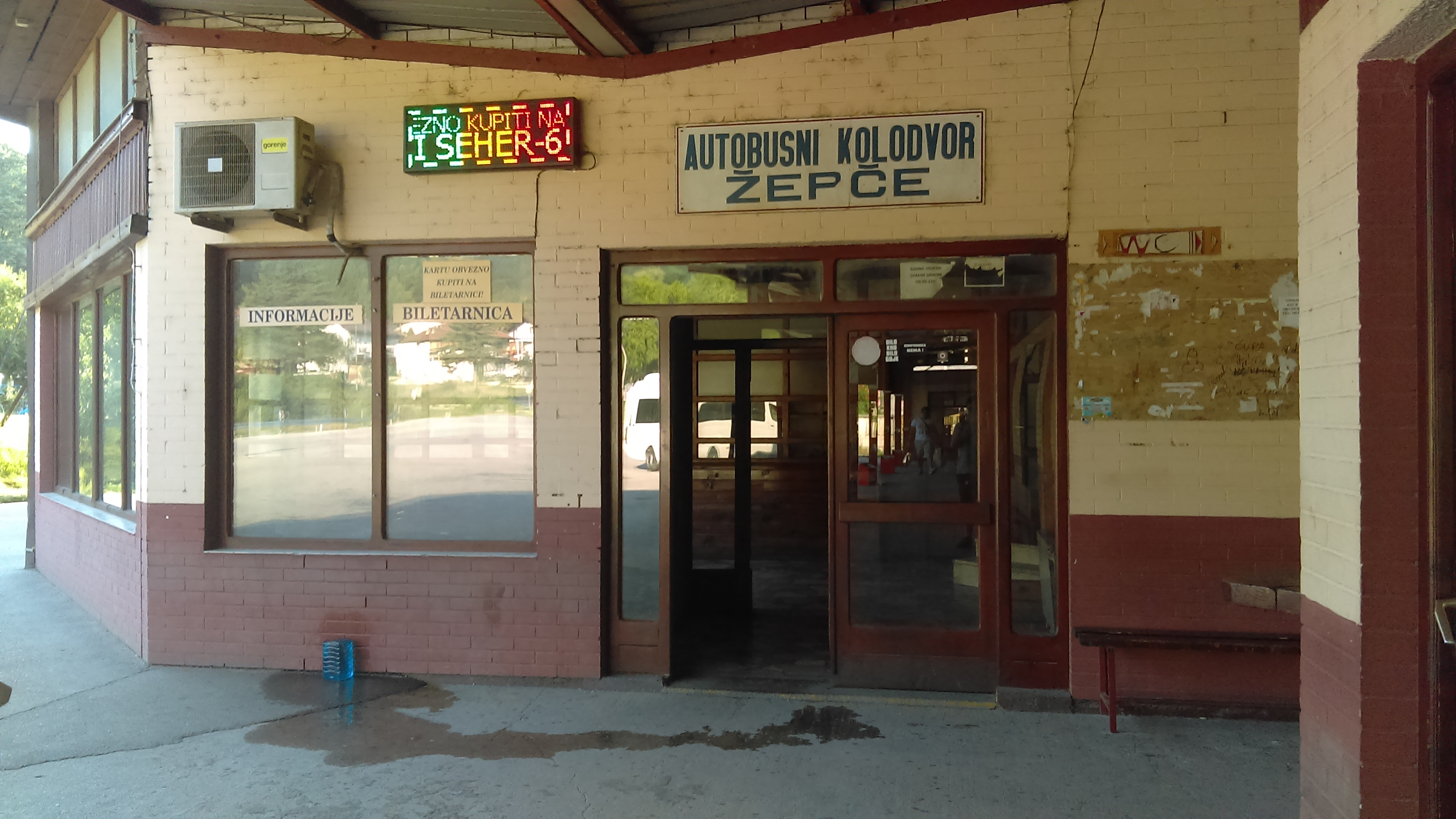
Bus station

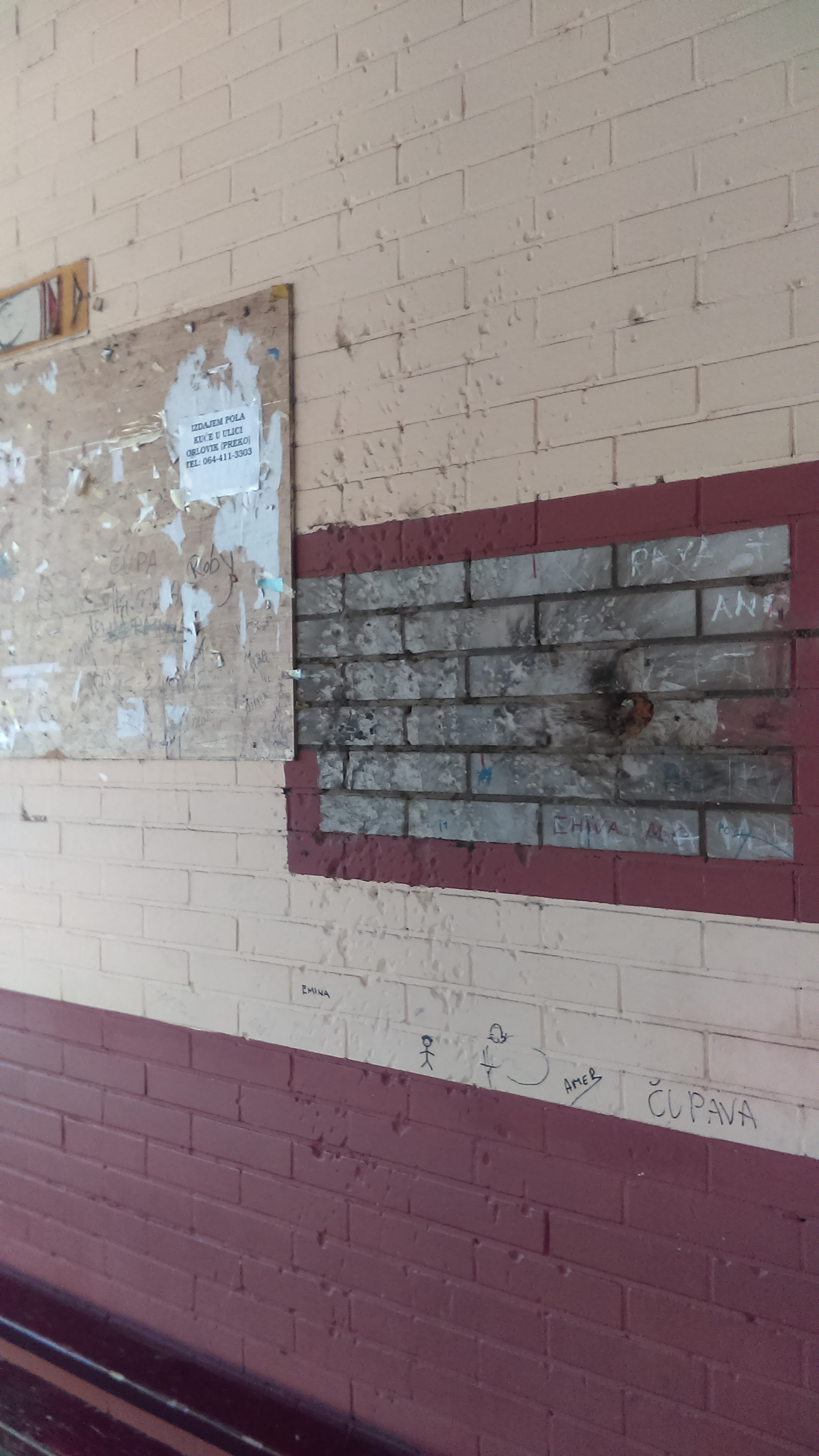
Bus station (war signs)
