= Maglaj =

Maglaj Маглај
- Town and municipality
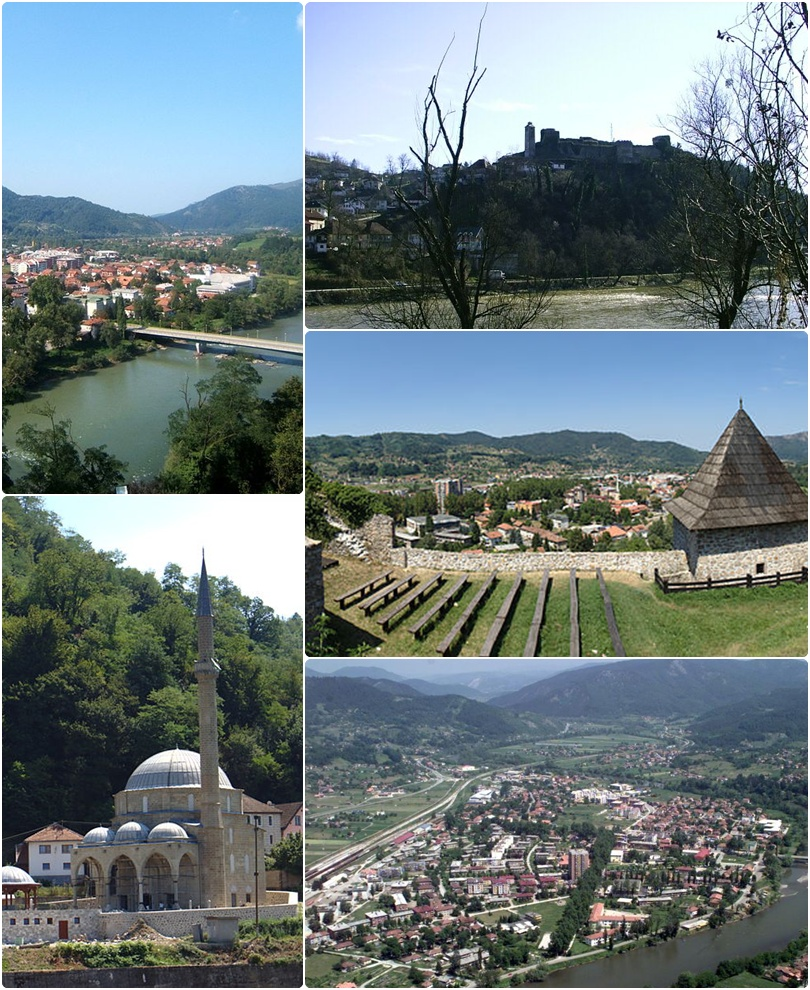
- Maglaj

- Coat of arms

- Location of Maglaj within Bosnia and Herzegovina.

- Location within Bosnia and Herzegovina
- Coordinates: 44°33′N 18°06′E
- Country: Bosnia and Herzegovina
- Entity: Federation of Bosnia and Herzegovina
- Canton: Zenica-Doboj

Government
  - Municipal mayor: Maid Suljkanović (SDA)

Area
  - Town and municipality: 290 km^{2} (110 sq mi)

Population (2013 census)
  - Town and municipality: 34,980
  - Density: 120/km^{2} (310/sq mi)
  - Urban: 6,438
- Time zone: UTC+1 (CET)
  - Summer (DST): UTC+2 (CEST)
- Area code: +387 32
- Website: www.maglaj.ba

Maglaj is a town and municipality located in the Zenica-Doboj Canton of the Federation of Bosnia and Herzegovina, an entity of Bosnia and Herzegovina. It is located in northern Bosnia and Herzegovina, 25 km (16 mi) south of Doboj. It has a population of 6,438, with 34,980 inhabitants in the municipality.

== Population ==
Population of settlements – Maglaj municipality
	Settlement	1961	1971	1981	1991	2013
	Total	32,944	38,037	42,160	43,388	34,980
1	Bijela Ploča				1,004	616
2	Bradići Donji				664	462
3	Bradići Gornji				567	430
4	Čobe				654	635
5	Domislica				703	679
6	Donja Bočinja				821	214
7	Donji Ulišnjak				634	585
8	Jablanica				1,570	864
9	Kopice				1,231	1,227
10	Kosova				1,745	1,809
11	Liješnica				1,807	1,576
12	Maglaj		5,952	6,913	7,957	6,438
13	Misurići				1,937	1,556
14	Mladoševica				866	720
15	Moševac				1,270	1,490
16	Novi Šeher				1,802	1,495
17	Ravna				516	476
18	Strupina				749	536
19	Tujnica				480	370

=== Ethnic composition ===
Ethnic composition – Maglaj town
	2013.	1991.	1981.	1971.
Total	6,438 (100,0%)	7,957 (100,0%)	6,913 (100,0%)	5,952 (100,0%)
Bosniaks		4,292 (53,94%)	3,422 (49,50%)	3,421 (57,48%)
Serbs		1,975 (24,82%)	1,585 (22,93%)	1,593 (26,76%)
Yugoslavs		1,026 (12,89%)	1,419 (20,53%)	197 (3,310%)
Croats		446 (5,605%)	416 (6,018%)	582 (9,778%)
Others		218 (2,740%)	30 (0,434%)	112 (1,882%)
Albanians			15 (0,217%)	10 (0,168%)
Montenegrins			14 (0,203%)	14 (0,235%)
Slovenes			11 (0,159%)	22 (0,370%)
Macedonians			1 (0,014%)	1 (0,017%)

Sastav stanovništva – općina Maglaj
	2013.	1991.	1981.	1971.	1961.
Total	34,980 (100,0%)	43,388 (100,0%)	42,160 (100,0%)	38,037 (100,0%)	32,944 (100,0%)
Bosniaks	29,810 (85,59%)	19,569 (45,10%)	17,236 (40,88%)	15,628 (41,09%)	7,998 (24.28%)
Croats	2,041 (8,818%)	8,365 (19,28%)	8,341 (19,78%)	7,946 (20,89%)	7,313 (22.20%)
Serbs	810 (3,500%)	13,312 (30,68%)	13,662 (32,41%)	13,888 (36,51%)	13,870 (42.10%)
Others	485 (2,095%)	634 (1,461%)	164 (0,389%)	257 (0,676%)	215 (0.65%)
Yugoslavs		1,508 (3,476%)	2,682 (6,361%)	240 (0,631%)	3,548 (10.77%)
Montenegrins			40 (0,095%)	38 (0,100%)	
Albanians			18 (0,043%)	15 (0,039%)	
Slovenes			12 (0,028%)	22 (0,058%)	
Macedonians			5 (0,012%)	2 (0,005%)	
Roma				1 (0,003%)	

== Geography ==
The town is situated in the northern part of Bosnia and Herzegovina and is situated in territory where Bosniaks presently form a large majority. The old Maglaj, like numerous other cities in Bosnia and Herzegovina, has an old town with mosques, traditional houses dating back from the Ottoman Empire, and a fortress that stands as a symbol of Maglaj. The new part of Maglaj, situated on the West side of the river Bosna, is made up of modern architecture that was started in the 1950s, and became massively developed until 1991.

The Bosna flows through Maglaj on its way north to the Sava river on the border between Bosnia and Herzegovina and Croatia. Before the Bosnian War, the Bosna river was heavily polluted due to heavy industrial activity at the nearby Natron paper and pulp factory, as well as steel and wood industry factories in the southern cities of Zenica and Zavidovići respectively. Nowadays, the river has become cleaner due to decreased industrial activity at those plants and higher environmental standards.

== Demographics ==
The city, as well as the entire Maglaj municipality, have been subject to a large demographic population shift. Close to all of its pre-war Christian inhabitants, i.e. Orthodox Serbs and Catholic Croats, who made up the majority of the pre-war municipality population, no longer reside in the Maglaj municipality. Today, the municipality is overwhelmingly Bosnian Muslim.

The Orthodox population has largely settled in the municipalities of Doboj and Modriča in the Republika Srpska, while the Catholic population has settled in the nearby municipality of Žepče, an enclave inhabited largely by Croats. A significant number of former Croat inhabitants have also settled in Croatia's capital Zagreb.

Due to the severe fighting around Maglaj throughout the Bosnian War, and the catastrophic conditions it was exposed to, numerous Bosniaks have departed the region as well.

Pre-war Maglaj was unique because over one third of its married couples were made up of mixed ethnic groups. As a result of this, a great number of these Maglaj inhabitants felt welcome by none of the three warring ethnic groups, and tried to settle abroad. Consequentially, Maglaj residents have dispersed.

== History ==
Maglaj originated in the 14th century. The river Bosna goes through this town.

From 1929 to 1941, Maglaj was part of the Vrbas Banovina of the Kingdom of Yugoslavia.

The city endured a long siege by Bosnian Serbs forces between 1992 and 1994 during the Bosnian War, when the area was the scene of heavy fighting and the population had to be supplied by airdrops.

The last flooding occurred on May 15 and 16, 2014. Although little floods occur every year, the 2014 flood was major, people lost their homes and belongings.

== Notable people ==
- Admir Hasančić, football player
- Alma Čardžić, singer, representative of Bosnia and Herzegovina in the Eurovision Song Contest in 1994 and 1997
- Bahrudin Čengić, film director and screenwriter
- Šemsa Suljaković, singer
- Edhem Mulabdić, writer
- Ruža Tomašić, politician and European Parliament member

== Twin towns – sister cities ==
Maglaj is twinned with:

- Çubuk, Turkey
