= Kontakt TV =

- Country: Bosnia and Herzegovina
- Broadcast area: Banja Luka
- Headquarters: Banja Luka; Vase Pelagića br. 25

Programming
- Language: Serbian
- Picture format: 4:3 576i SDTV

Ownership
- Owner: "ODGOVOR KONTAKT" d.o.o. Banja Luka
- Key people: Bojan Hrstić

History
- Launched: 2015

Links
- Website: www.mojkontakt.com

Kontakt TV or Kontakt is a local commercial cable television channel based in Banja Luka, Bosnia and Herzegovina. The program is mainly produced in Serbian. The TV station was established in 2015. Kontakt TV broadcasts a variety of programs such as local news, sports, music, and documentaries.

Radio Kontakt is also part of the company.
