= Radio Kontakt =

Bosnian radio station

Banja Luka; Bosnia and Herzegovina
- Broadcast area: Banja Luka
- Frequency: Banja Luka 99.3 MHz
- RDS: KONTAKT

Programming
- Language: Serbian
- Format: Local news, talk and music

Ownership
- Owner: ODGOVOR KONTAKT d.o.o. Banja Luka
- Sister stations: Kontakt TV

History
- Founded: September 1, 1997

Technical information
- Licensing authority: CRA BiH
- Transmitter coordinates: 44°46′N 17°11′E
- Repeater: Banja Luka/Šibovi

Links
- Website: www.mojkontakt.com

Radio Kontakt or Kontakt Radio is a Bosnian local commercial radio station, broadcasting from Banja Luka, Bosnia and Herzegovina. This radio station broadcasts a variety of programs such as music and local news.

The owner of the radio station is the company ODGOVOR KONTAKT d.o.o. Banja Luka. Cable television channel Kontakt TV is also part of company.

The program is mainly produced in Serbian at one FM frequency (Banja Luka 99.3 MHz) and it is available in the city of Banja Luka as well as in nearby municipalities.

Estimated number of listeners of Radio Kontakt is around 159,556.

== Frequencies ==
- Banja Luka 99.3 MHz

== See also ==
- List of radio stations in Bosnia and Herzegovina
- Big Radio 3
- Radio A
- Pop FM
- Radio Kozara
