= Outline of Bosnia and Herzegovina =

Country in Southeast Europe

The Flag of Bosnia and Herzegovina

The Coat of arms of Bosnia and Herzegovina

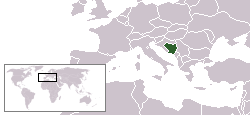
The location of Bosnia and Herzegovina

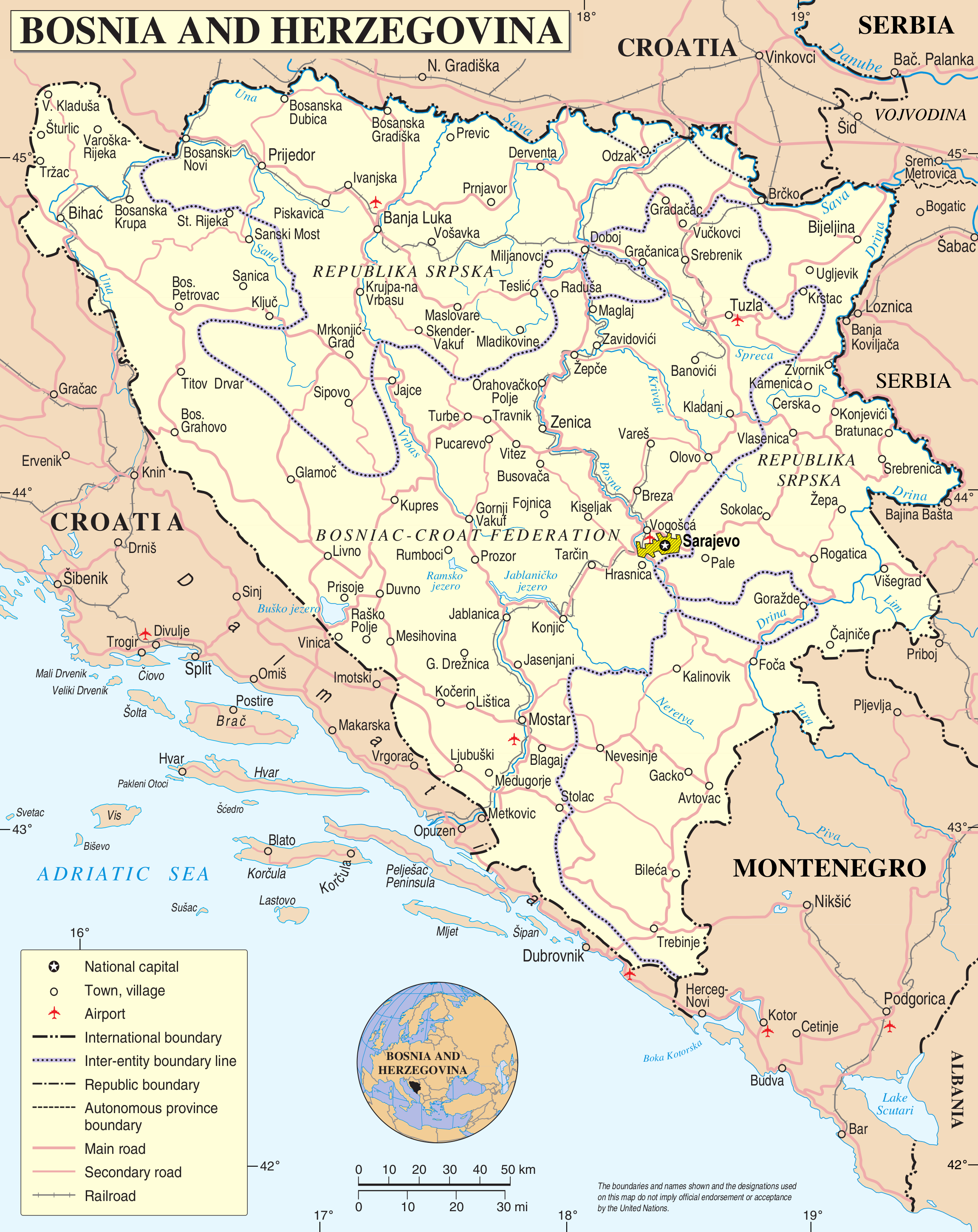
An enlargeable map of the Bosnia and Herzegovina

The following outline is provided as an overview of and topical guide to Bosnia and Herzegovina:

Bosnia and Herzegovina – country in Southwestern Europe, on the Balkan Peninsula. It comprises two autonomous entities: the Federation of Bosnia and Herzegovina and Republika Srpska, with a third region, the Brčko District, governed under local government. The country is home to three ethnic groups: Bosniaks are the largest group of the three, with Serbs second and Croats third.

== General reference ==
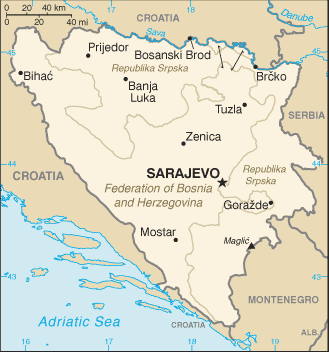
An enlargeable basic map of Bosnia and Herzegovina

- Pronunciation: /ˈbɒzniə ... ˌhɜːrtsəˈɡoʊvɪnə/ BOZ-nee-ə ... HURT-sə-GOH-vin-ə or /ˌhɜːrtsəɡoʊˈviːnə/ HURT-sə-goh-VEE-nə;
- Common English country name: Bosnia and Herzegovina
- Official English country name: Bosnia and Herzegovina
- Common endonym(s): Bosna i Hercegovina – Босна и Херцеговина
- Official endonym(s): Bosna i Hercegovina – Босна и Херцеговина
- Adjectival(s): Bosnian, Herzegovinian
- Demonym(s):
- Etymology: Name of Bosnia and Herzegovina
- ISO country codes: BA, BIH, 070
- ISO region codes: See ISO 3166-2:BA
- Internet country code top-level domain: .ba

== Geography of Bosnia and Herzegovina ==
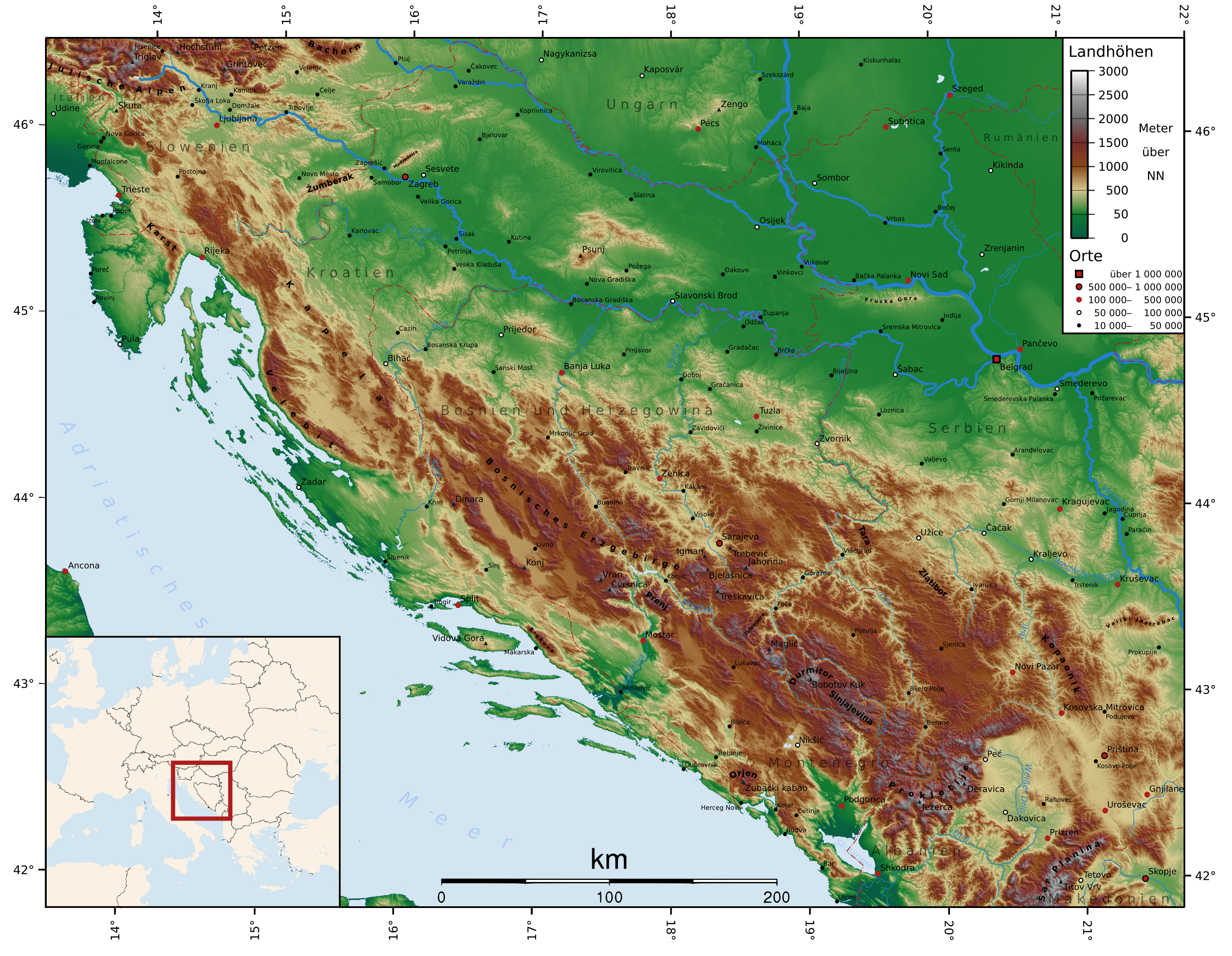
An enlargeable topographic map of Bosnia and Herzegovina and adjacent areas

Geography of Bosnia and Herzegovina

- Bosnia and Herzegovina is: a country
- Location:
  - Eastern Hemisphere
  - Northern Hemisphere
    - Eurasia
      - Europe
        - Southern Europe
          - Balkans (also known as "Southeastern Europe")
  - Time zone: Central European Time (UTC+01), Central European Summer Time (UTC+02)
  - Extreme points of Bosnia and Herzegovina
    - High: Maglić 2,386 m (7,828 ft)
    - Low: Adriatic Sea 0 m
  - Land boundaries: 1,538 km

Croatia 932 km
Serbia 357 km
Montenegro 249 km

  - Coastline: Adriatic Sea 20 km
- Population of Bosnia and Herzegovina: 3,412,000 (2024) - 133rd most populous country
- Area of Bosnia and Herzegovina: 51,197 square kilometres (19,767 sq mi) - 127th largest country
- Atlas of Bosnia and Herzegovina

=== Environment of Bosnia and Herzegovina ===
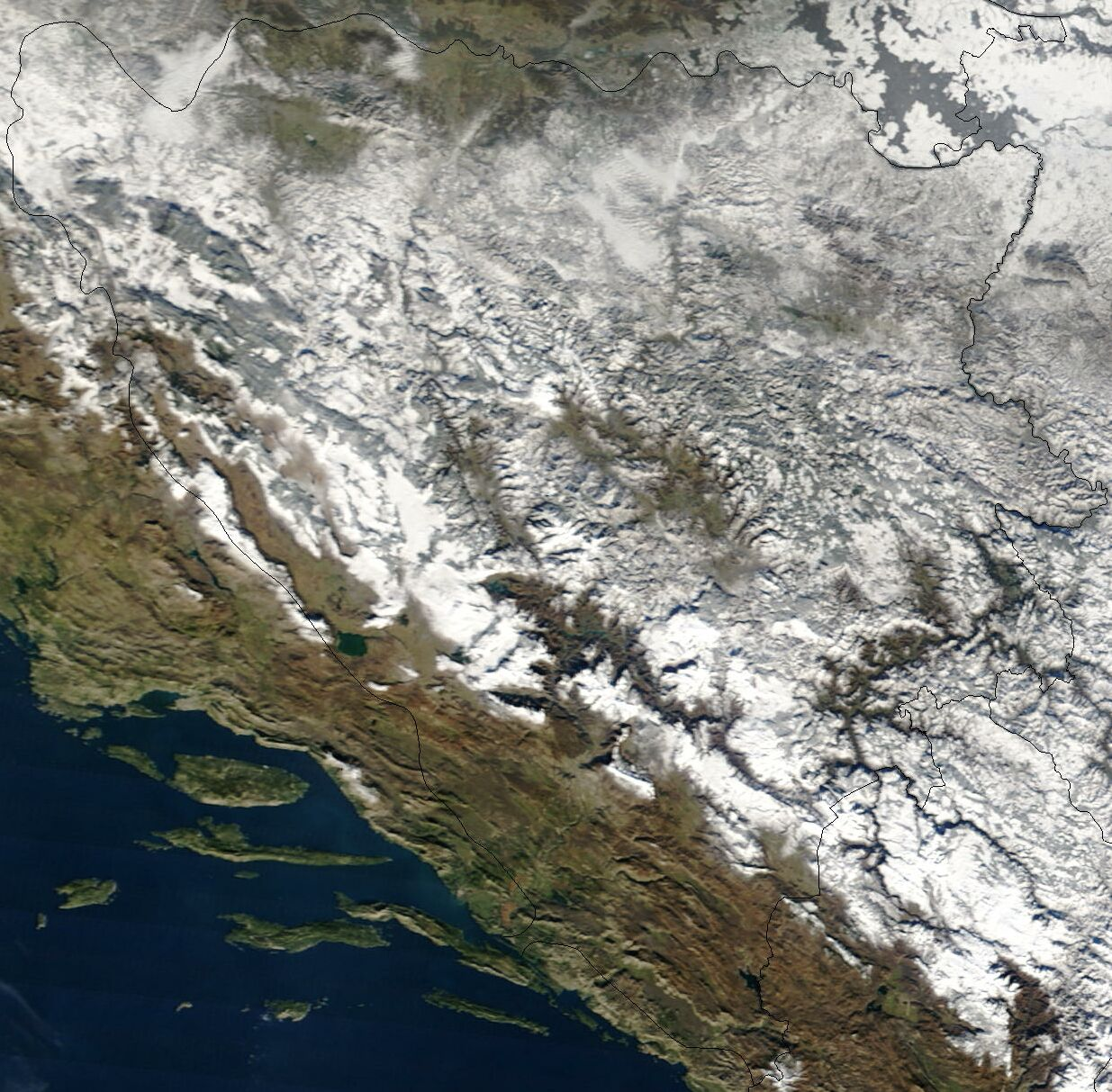
An enlargeable satellite image of Bosnia and Herzegovina

- Climate of Bosnia and Herzegovina
- Renewable energy in Bosnia and Herzegovina
- Geology of Bosnia and Herzegovina
- Protected areas of Bosnia and Herzegovina
  - Biosphere reserves in Bosnia and Herzegovina
  - National parks of Bosnia and Herzegovina
- Wildlife of Bosnia and Herzegovina
  - Fauna of Bosnia and Herzegovina
    - Birds of Bosnia and Herzegovina
    - Mammals of Bosnia and Herzegovina

==== Natural geographic features of Bosnia and Herzegovina ====
- Glaciers of Bosnia and Herzegovina
- Islands of Bosnia and Herzegovina
- Lakes of Bosnia and Herzegovina
- Mountains of Bosnia and Herzegovina
  - Volcanoes in Bosnia and Herzegovina
- Rivers of Bosnia and Herzegovina
- World Heritage Sites in Bosnia and Herzegovina

=== Regions of Bosnia and Herzegovina ===
Regions of Bosnia and Herzegovina

==== Ecoregions of Bosnia and Herzegovina ====
List of ecoregions in Bosnia and Herzegovina

==== Administrative divisions of Bosnia and Herzegovina ====
Administrative divisions of Bosnia and Herzegovina

- Municipalities of Bosnia and Herzegovina

===== Municipalities of Bosnia and Herzegovina =====
Municipalities of Bosnia and Herzegovina

- Capital of Bosnia and Herzegovina: Sarajevo
- Cities of Bosnia and Herzegovina

=== Demography of Bosnia and Herzegovina ===
Demographics of Bosnia and Herzegovina

== Government and politics of Bosnia and Herzegovina ==
Politics of Bosnia and Herzegovina

- Form of government: parliamentary representative democratic republic
- Capital of Bosnia and Herzegovina: Sarajevo
- Elections in Bosnia and Herzegovina
- Political parties in Bosnia and Herzegovina

=== Branches of government ===
Government of Bosnia and Herzegovina

==== Executive branch of the government of Bosnia and Herzegovina ====
- Head of state: Presidency of Bosnia and Herzegovina
- Head of government: Prime Minister of Bosnia and Herzegovina
- Cabinet of Bosnia and Herzegovina

==== Legislative branch of the government of Bosnia and Herzegovina ====
- Parliament of Bosnia and Herzegovina (bicameral)
  - Upper house: House of Peoples of Bosnia and Herzegovina
  - Lower house: House of Representatives of Bosnia and Herzegovina

==== Judicial branch of the government of Bosnia and Herzegovina ====
Court system of Bosnia and Herzegovina

- Constitutional Court of Bosnia and Herzegovina

=== Foreign relations of Bosnia and Herzegovina ===
Foreign relations of Bosnia and Herzegovina

- Diplomatic missions in Bosnia and Herzegovina
- Diplomatic missions of Bosnia and Herzegovina

==== International organization membership ====
The government of Bosnia and Herzegovina is a member of:

- Bank for International Settlements (BIS)
- Central European Initiative (CEI)
- Council of Europe (CE)
- Euro-Atlantic Partnership Council (EAPC)
- European Bank for Reconstruction and Development (EBRD)
- Food and Agriculture Organization (FAO)
- Group of 77 (G77)
- International Atomic Energy Agency (IAEA)
- International Bank for Reconstruction and Development (IBRD)
- International Civil Aviation Organization (ICAO)
- International Criminal Court (ICCt)
- International Criminal Police Organization (Interpol)
- International Development Association (IDA)
- International Federation of Red Cross and Red Crescent Societies (IFRCS)
- International Finance Corporation (IFC)
- International Fund for Agricultural Development (IFAD)
- International Labour Organization (ILO)
- International Maritime Organization (IMO)
- International Mobile Satellite Organization (IMSO)
- International Monetary Fund (IMF)
- International Olympic Committee (IOC)
- International Organization for Migration (IOM)
- International Organization for Standardization (ISO)
- International Red Cross and Red Crescent Movement (ICRM)
- International Telecommunication Union (ITU)
- International Telecommunications Satellite Organization (ITSO)
- International Trade Union Confederation (ITUC)
- Inter-Parliamentary Union (IPU)
- Multilateral Investment Guarantee Agency (MIGA)
- Nonaligned Movement (NAM) (observer)
- Organisation of Islamic Cooperation (OIC) (observer)
- Organization for Security and Cooperation in Europe (OSCE)
- Organisation for the Prohibition of Chemical Weapons (OPCW)
- Organization of American States (OAS) (observer)
- Partnership for Peace (PFP)
- Southeast European Cooperative Initiative (SECI)
- United Nations (UN)
- United Nations Conference on Trade and Development (UNCTAD)
- United Nations Educational, Scientific, and Cultural Organization (UNESCO)
- United Nations Industrial Development Organization (UNIDO)
- United Nations Organization Mission in the Democratic Republic of the Congo (MONUC)
- Universal Postal Union (UPU)
- World Customs Organization (WCO)
- World Federation of Trade Unions (WFTU)
- World Health Organization (WHO)
- World Intellectual Property Organization (WIPO)
- World Meteorological Organization (WMO)
- World Tourism Organization (UNWTO)
- World Trade Organization (WTO) (observer)

=== Law and order in Bosnia and Herzegovina ===
Law of Bosnia and Herzegovina

- Capital punishment in Bosnia and Herzegovina
- Constitution of Bosnia and Herzegovina
- Crime in Bosnia and Herzegovina
- Human rights in Bosnia and Herzegovina
  - LGBT rights in Bosnia and Herzegovina
  - Freedom of religion in Bosnia and Herzegovina
- Law enforcement in Bosnia and Herzegovina

=== Military of Bosnia and Herzegovina ===
Military of Bosnia and Herzegovina

- Command
  - Commander-in-chief:
    - Ministry of Defence of Bosnia and Herzegovina
- Forces
  - Army of Bosnia and Herzegovina
  - Navy of Bosnia and Herzegovina
  - Air Force of Bosnia and Herzegovina
  - Special forces of Bosnia and Herzegovina
- Military history of Bosnia and Herzegovina
- Military ranks of Bosnia and Herzegovina

=== Local government in Bosnia and Herzegovina ===
Local government in Bosnia and Herzegovina

== History of Bosnia and Herzegovina ==
History of Bosnia and Herzegovina

- Timeline of the history of Bosnia and Herzegovina
- Current events of Bosnia and Herzegovina
- Military history of Bosnia and Herzegovina

== Culture of Bosnia and Herzegovina ==
Culture of Bosnia and Herzegovina

- Architecture of Bosnia and Herzegovina
- Cuisine of Bosnia and Herzegovina
- Festivals in Bosnia and Herzegovina
- Languages of Bosnia and Herzegovina
- Media in Bosnia and Herzegovina
- National symbols of Bosnia and Herzegovina
  - Coat of arms of Bosnia and Herzegovina
  - Flag of Bosnia and Herzegovina
  - National anthem of Bosnia and Herzegovina
- People of Bosnia and Herzegovina
- Prostitution in Bosnia and Herzegovina
- Public holidays in Bosnia and Herzegovina
- Records of Bosnia and Herzegovina
- Religion in Bosnia and Herzegovina
  - Christianity in Bosnia and Herzegovina
  - Hinduism in Bosnia and Herzegovina
  - Islam in Bosnia and Herzegovina
  - Judaism in Bosnia and Herzegovina
  - Sikhism in Bosnia and Herzegovina
- World Heritage Sites in Bosnia and Herzegovina

=== Art in Bosnia and Herzegovina ===
- Art in Bosnia and Herzegovina
- Cinema of Bosnia and Herzegovina
- Literature of Bosnia and Herzegovina
- Music of Bosnia and Herzegovina
- Television in Bosnia and Herzegovina
- Theatre in Bosnia and Herzegovina

=== Sport in Bosnia and Herzegovina ===
Sport in Bosnia and Herzegovina

- Football in Bosnia and Herzegovina
- Bosnia and Herzegovina at the Olympics

== Economy and infrastructure of Bosnia and Herzegovina ==
Economy of Bosnia and Herzegovina

- Economic rank, by nominal GDP (2025): 107th (one hundred and seventh)
- Agriculture in Bosnia and Herzegovina
- Banking in Bosnia and Herzegovina
  - National bank of Bosnia and Herzegovina
- Communications in Bosnia and Herzegovina
  - Internet in Bosnia and Herzegovina
- Companies of Bosnia and Herzegovina
- Currency of Bosnia and Herzegovina: Convertible Mark
  - ISO 4217: BAM
- Energy in Bosnia and Herzegovina
  - Energy policy of Bosnia and Herzegovina
  - Oil industry in Bosnia and Herzegovina
- Health care in Bosnia and Herzegovina
- Mining in Bosnia and Herzegovina
- Bosnia and Herzegovina Stock Exchange
- Tourism in Bosnia and Herzegovina
- Transport in Bosnia and Herzegovina
  - Airports in Bosnia and Herzegovina
  - Rail transport in Bosnia and Herzegovina
  - Roads in Bosnia and Herzegovina

== Education in Bosnia and Herzegovina ==
Education in Bosnia and Herzegovina

== See also ==
- Outline of Slavic history and culture
- List of Slavic studies journals
