= Telephone numbers in Bosnia and Herzegovina =

- Location of Bosnia and Herzegovina
- Country: Bosnia and Herzegovina
- Continent: Europe
- Regulator: RAK
- Numbering plan type: Open
- Format: 0XX XXX XXX
- Country code: +387
- International access: 00
- Long-distance: 0

The country calling code of Bosnia and Herzegovina is +387.

Bosnia and Herzegovina received the +387 code following the breakup of the Socialist Federal Republic of Yugoslavia in 1992, whose country code was previously +38.

An example for calling telephones in Sarajevo, Bosnia and Herzegovina is as follows:

- 0 33 xxx xxx (within Sarajevo)
- 0 33 xxx xxx (within Bosnia and Herzegovina)
- +387 33 xxx xxx (outside of Bosnia and Herzegovina)

This is a list of dialing codes in Bosnia and Herzegovina.

== Fixed telephony areas ==
=== Calling code areas in the Federation of Bosnia and Herzegovina ===
Canton	Code	Municipalities covered by code
Central Bosnia Canton	030	Bugojno, Busovača, Dobretići, Donji Vakuf, Fojnica, Gornji Vakuf, Jajce, Kiseljak, Kreševo, Novi Travnik, Travnik, Vitez
Posavina Canton	031	Domaljevac-Šamac, Odžak, Orašje
Zenica-Doboj Canton	032	Breza, Doboj South, Kakanj, Maglaj, Olovo, Tešanj, Usora, Vareš, Visoko, Zavidovići, Zenica, Žepče
Sarajevo Canton	033	Centar (Sarajevo), Hadžići, Ilidža, Ilijaš, Novi Grad (Sarajevo), Novo Sarajevo, Stari Grad (Sarajevo), Trnovo, Vogošća
Canton 10	034	Bosansko Grahovo, Drvar, Glamoč, Kupres, Livno, Tomislavgrad
Tuzla Canton	035	Banovići, Čelić, Doboj East, Gračanica, Gradačac, Kalesija, Kladanj, Lukavac, Sapna, Srebrenik, Teočak, Tuzla, Živinice
Herzegovina-Neretva Canton	036	Čapljina, Čitluk, Jablanica, Konjic, Mostar, Neum, Prozor, Ravno, Stolac
Una-Sana Canton	037	Bihać, Bosanska Krupa, Bosanski Petrovac, Bužim, Cazin, Ključ, Sanski Most, Velika Kladuša
Bosnian Podrinje Canton	038	Foča-Ustikolina, Goražde, Pale-Prača
West Herzegovina Canton	039	Grude, Ljubuški, Posušje, Široki Brijeg

=== Calling code areas in the Brčko District ===
Network group	Code	Municipalities covered by code
Brčko District	049	Brčko District

=== Calling code areas in Republika Srpska ===
Network group	Code	Municipalities covered by code
Mrkonjić Grad	050	Jezero, Kupres, Mrkonjić Grad, Ribnik, Šipovo
Banja Luka	051	Banja Luka, Čelinac, Gradiška, Istočni Drvar, Kneževo, Kotor Varoš, Laktaši, Petrovac, Prnjavor, Srbac
Prijedor	052	Kostajnica, Kozarska Dubica, Krupa na Uni, Novi Grad, Oštra Luka, Prijedor
Doboj	053	Brod, Derventa, Doboj, Modriča, Petrovo, Stanari, Teslić, Vukosavlje
Šamac	054	Donji Žabar, Pelagićevo, Šamac
Bijeljina	055	Bijeljina, Lopare, Ugljevik
Zvornik	056	Bratunac, Milići, Osmaci, Srebrenica, Šekovići, Vlasenica, Zvornik
Pale	057	Han Pijesak, Istočna Ilidža, Istočni Stari Grad, Istočno Novo Sarajevo, Kalinovik, Pale, Sokolac, Trnovo
Foča	058	Čajniče, Foča, Rogatica, Rudo, Novo Goražde, Višegrad
Trebinje	059	Berkovići, Bileća, Gacko, Istočni Mostar, Ljubinje, Nevesinje, Trebinje

=== Nomad numbers in Bosnia and Herzegovina ===
Destination code	Number block	Max. length	Min. length	Telecom operator
070	07020	8	8	BH Telecom
070	07021	8	8	BH Telecom
070	07022	8	8	BH Telecom
070	07023	8	8	BH Telecom
070	07024	8	8	BH Telecom
070	07025	8	8	BH Telecom
070	070300	8	8	Europronet d.o.o.
070	070309	8	8	Europronet d.o.o.
070	070301	8	8	M&H Company
070	070310	8	8	ELTA-KABEL d.o.o.
070	070320	8	8	CRUMB GROUP d.o.o.
070	070330	8	8	Aneks d.o.o.
070	070340	8	8	AIRABA d.d.
070	070350	8	8	DASTO-SEMTEL d.o.o.

== Mobile phone codes ==
Calling codes in the table are assigned to new customers by the respective provider. However, it has been possible to change the operator and retain the old calling code (along with the rest of the phone number) since 2013.

Destination code	Number block	Max. length	Min. length	Telecom operator
60	31	9	9	BH Mobile
60	32	9	9	BH Mobile
60	33	9	9	BH Mobile
60	34	9	9	BH Mobile
60	38	9	9	BH Mobile
60	39	9	9	Happy (owned by BH Telecom)
61	0	8	8	BH Mobile
61	1	8	8	BH Mobile
61	2	8	8	BH Mobile
61	3	8	8	BH Mobile
61	4	8	8	BH Mobile
61	5	8	8	BH Mobile
61	6	8	8	BH Mobile
61	7	8	8	BH Mobile
61	8	8	8	BH Mobile
61	9	8	8	BH Mobile
62	0	8	8	BH Mobile
62	1	8	8	BH Mobile
62	2	8	8	BH Mobile
62	3	8	8	BH Mobile
62	4	8	8	BH Mobile
62	5	8	8	BH Mobile
62	6	8	8	BH Mobile
62	7	8	8	BH Mobile
62	8	8	8	BH Mobile
62	9	8	8	BH Mobile
63	0	8	8	ERONET
63	1	8	8	ERONET
63	2	8	8	ERONET
63	3	8	8	ERONET
63	4	8	8	ERONET
63	5	8	8	ERONET
63	6	8	8	ERONET
63	7	8	8	ERONET
63	8	8	8	ERONET
63	9	8	8	ERONET
64	40	9	9	Haloo (owned by HT Eronet)
64	41	9	9	Haloo
64	42	9	9	Haloo
64	43	9	9	Haloo
64	44	9	9	Haloo
64	45	9	9	Haloo
65	0	8	8	m:tel
65	1	8	8	m:tel
65	2	8	8	m:tel
65	3	8	8	m:tel
65	4	8	8	m:tel
65	5	8	8	m:tel
65	6	8	8	m:tel
65	7	8	8	m:tel
65	8	8	8	m:tel
65	9	8	8	m:tel
66	0	8	8	m:tel
66	1	8	8	m:tel
66	2	8	8	m:tel
66	3	8	8	m:tel
66	4	8	8	m:tel
66	5	8	8	m:tel
66	6	8	8	m:tel
66	7	8	8	m:tel
66	8	8	8	m:tel
66	9	8	8	m:tel
67	11	9	9	Novotel (using m:tel)
67	12	9	9	Novotel (using m:tel)
67	15	9	9	*supernova (using m:tel)

== Special codes ==
The following special telephone numbers are valid across the country:

- 112 – General emergency
- 121 – Civil protection
- 122 – Police
- 123 – Fire Department
- 124 – Ambulance
- 125 – Exact time
- 1202 – Telegram service
- 1206 – Military police
- 1208 – Union of consumers in BiH
- 1261 – SOS hotline for prevention of human trafficking
- 1262 – Search and rescue services of BiH
- 1264 – SOS hotline for Republika Srpska Gender center
- 1265 – SOS hotline for victims of family violence

=== Road assistance numbers ===
- 1282 – BIHAMK (Bosnia and Herzegovina Automobile and Motorcycle Club)
- 1285 – AMSRS (Automobile and Motorcycle Association of Republika Srpska)
- 1288 – AAMKBIH (Association Automobile and Motorcycle of Bosnia and Herzegovina)

=== Telephone Number Directory ===
- 1182 – Local Telephone Number Directory of BH Telecom
- 1183 – International Telephone Number Directory of BH Telecom
- 1185 – Local Telephone Number Directory of Telekom Srpske
- 1186 – International Telephone Number Directory of Telekom Srpske
- 1188 – Local Telephone Number Directory of HT Eronet
- 1266 – International Telephone Number Directory of HT Eronet
- 1272 – Report a fault in the telephone line for BH Telecom customers
- 0800 50000 option 1 – Report a fault in the telephone line for Telekom Srpske customers
- 1488 – Report a fault in the telephone line for HT Eronet customers
- 17030 – Charity Numbers (NVO Otvorena mreža Bosne i Hercegovine)
- 17050 – Charity Numbers (NVO Otvorena mreža Bosne i Hercegovine)
- 1400 – Calling at a specified time
- 1401 – Wake-up service (Set time)
- 1402 – Wake-up service (Checking the settings)
- 1403 – Wake-up service (Cancellation of the last settings)
- 1404 – Wake-up service (Cancellation of all settings)
- 1405 – Test of phone device
- 1417 – Express Mail Services BH Pošta
- 1371 – Express Mail Services Pošte Srpske
- 1323 – Express Mail Services Hrvatska pošta Mostar

=== Taxi services numbers ===
- 1502 or 066 72 1502 – Hey Taxi (Mostar)
- 1503 or 063 1503 00 – Moj Taxi (Mostar)
- 1506 – HALO Taxi (Mostar)
- 1507 or 063 1507 15 – Arny Taxi (Mostar)
- 1598 or 063 150 011 – Pink Taxi (Mostar)
- 1599 Herc Taxi (Mostar)
- 1512 – AMMI 88 Taxi (Mostar)
- 1500, 1517, 1518 – Taxi Tuzla (Tuzla)
- 1515 – Sarajevo Taxi (Sarajevo)
- 1516 – Samir-Emir Taxi (Sarajevo)
- 1521 – Holand company Taxi (Sarajevo)
- 1522 – Paja Taxi (Sarajevo)
- 1533 (Banja Luka), 1552 (Bijeljina) – Patrol Taxi
- 1545 – Ideal Taxi (Banja Luka)
- 1551 – Maxi Taxi (Banja Luka)
- 1555 – Euro Taxi (Banja Luka)
- 1526 – Alo Taxi (Trebinje)
- 1553 – HALO Taxi (Široki Brijeg)

== Toll-free telephone number ==
Toll-free numbers by operators in Bosnia and Herzegovina:

- 0800 8xxxx – HT Eronet
- 0800 2xxxx – BH Telecom
- 0800 3xxxx – Telemach
- 0800 5xxxx – Telekom Srpske
- 0800 20002 – Landline technical support for BH Telecom customers
- 0800 31111 – Technical support for Telemach customers
- 0800 50000 – Landline technical support for Telekom Srpske customers
- 0800 88888 – Landline technical support for HT Mostar customers

== History ==
Bosnia and Herzegovina once was a part of Yugoslavia. While the international prefix for Yugoslavia was +38, places in Bosnia and Herzegovina were assigned phonecodes (and postcodes) beginning with 7 and 8. If the phonecode of a city was 0xx, the appropriate postcode was xx000. These postcodes are still valid.

Note: the codes listed below are now all obsolete. However, they are still used at times to identify places in Bosnia and Herzegovina, particularly 071 (Sarajevo), 078 (Banja Luka) and 075 (Tuzla).

Code	Area
070	Jajce
071	Sarajevo
072	Zenica
073	Goražde
074	Doboj
075	Tuzla
076	Brčko
077	Bihać
078	Banja Luka
079	Prijedor
080	Livno
088	Mostar
089	Trebinje
