= Telecommunications in Bosnia and Herzegovina =

Telecommunications in Bosnia and Herzegovina include radio, television, fixed and mobile telephones, and the Internet.

== Radio and television ==
- Radio stations: 3 large public radio broadcasters and many private radio stations (2010).
- Television stations: 3 public TV broadcasters: Radio and Television of Bosnia and Herzegovina (BHRT), Federation TV operating 2 networks, and Radio Televizija Republike Srpske; a local commercial network of 5 TV stations; 3 private, near-national TV stations; and dozens of small independent TV stations (2010).

The Communications Regulatory Agency (CRA) is charged with regulating the country's radio and television media.

During the Bosnian war, most media became propaganda tools of the authorities, armies, and factions. Since then, efforts have been made—with limited success—to develop media which bridge ethnic boundaries.

TV is the chief news source. The most influential broadcasters are the public radio and TV stations operated by the Bosniak-Croat and Serb entities. The Office of the High Representative (OHR), the leading international civilian agency in Bosnia, oversaw the development of national public broadcasting. The OHR worked to create a non-nationalist, civic media.

Sarajevo was home to Al-Jazeera Balkans TV, an offshoot of the Qatar-based pan-Arab news network, broadcasting in Bosnian, Croatian, and Serbian.This television was closed since 31 July 2025.

== Telephones ==
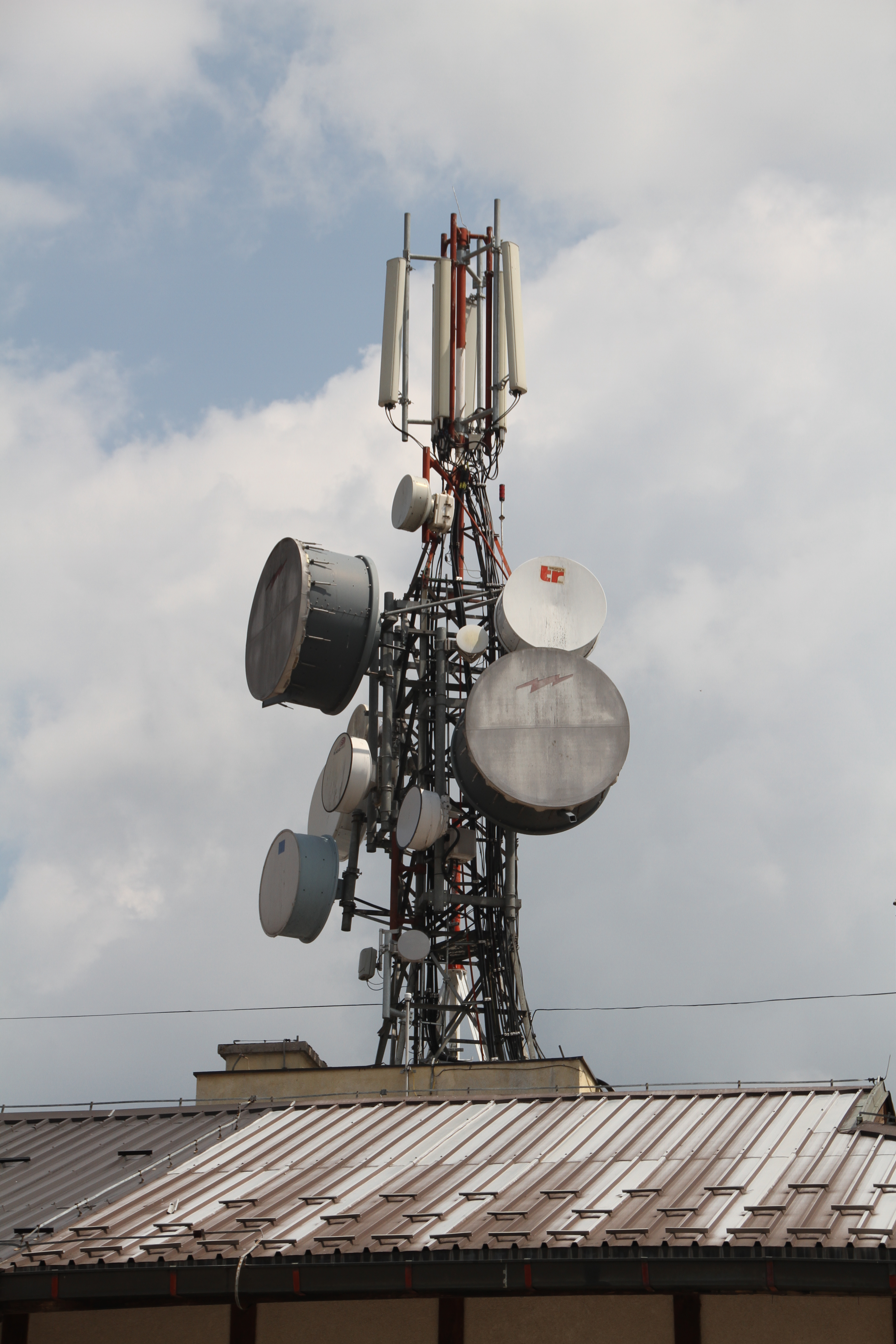
Telecom and radio infrastructure on a rooftop in the city of Pale, Republika Srpska, Bosnia and Herzegovina (c. 2012)

The telecommunications sector in Bosnia and Herzegovina is undergoing liberalisation. Up to 2006, there were three licensed fixed telecommunication operators: BH Telecom, based in Sarajevo, covering 51% of the population of BiH and most of the territory of the Federation of BiH; Telekom Srpske, based in Banja Luka, covering 34% of the population of BiH, mainly in the territory of Republica Srpska; and HT Eronet, covering 16% of the population of BiH, mainly in the Federation of BiH. The three companies enjoyed a de facto monopoly over their operating areas, although they have nationwide licenses for domestic and international calls. New competitors, such as Telemach, have entered the marked since the start of its liberalisation in 2007. The numbers of fixed telephony service subscribers were 849,027 in 2001 and 1,022,475 in 2007. Fixed telephony penetration rates increased from 22.35% (2001) to 26.41% (2007).

The mobile telephony sector is highly competitive, as the three main telephone operators compete nationwide with the brands BH Mobile, M:Tel and ERONET. Mobile networks cover 99% of the population and have a 63.29% penetration rate, with 2,450,425 subscribers in 2007, doubling from 2004. All three mobile operators operate on 4G+ network.

The TLC operators are still mainly state-owned and there is strong resistance to privatisation, with 90% of BH Telecom and 50.1% of HT Mostar owned by the Federation of BiH. In Republika Srpska, Telekom Srpska was privatised and is now mainly (65%) owned by Telekom Srbija

The three main TLC operators have strong links to political parties. In 2003, an OHR-mandated audit revealed that BH Telekom, RS Telekom and HT Mostar suffered substantial misure of funds, corruption and mismanagement, with a total loss of US$57 million in 2002. Pressure for reform was raised by the public revelation of high salaries and financial support to political parties. This led to the sacking of the board of Bosniak-controlled BH Telekom in 2003. Yet, telecom companies continued being used as cash-machines by Bosnian political parties. In 2010, a U.S. cable defined Eronet and HT Mostar as HDZ BiH's "traditional cash cow", noting how "As Federation Minister of Finance in 1999, Covic helped arrange the transfer of Eronet to three private companies owned by HDZ-BiH interests. [Stipe] Prlic, as HT Mostar's General Manager, challenged the privatization in court and won, arguing that the Federation government had not authorized it. Covic has fought Prlic's reappointment ever since."

The telecommunications market is regulated by the Communications Regulatory Agency, which also regulates broadcasting and Internet sectors.

- Calling code: +387
- Total fixed lines: 583,729 lines (2023)
  - 212,624 analog fixed lines (2023)
  - 13,466 ISDN B channels (2023)
  - 9,372 Cellular local loop (CLL) subscriptions (2023)
  - 237,258 Voice over IP subscriptions (2023)
  - 328 public phones: (2023)
- Residential fixed lines: 336,874 (2023)
- Business fixed lines: 135,846 (2023)
- Total mobile cellular: 3.75 million active subscriptions (2023)
  - 2.6 million prepaid mobile cellular subscriptions (2023)
  - 1.2 million postpaid mobile cellular subscriptions (2023)
- Mobile cellular penetration:
  - 96.0% of the population covered by 4G mobile networks (2023)
  - 97.0% of the population covered by 3G mobile networks (2023)
  - 100% of the population covered by GSM mobile networks (2023)
- Short Message Service: 295.5 million SMS messages sent (2023)
- Multimedia Messaging Service: 1.3 million MMS messages sent (2023)
- Service providers:
  - 10 alternative fixed-line operators (2023)

== Internet ==
- Top level domain: .ba
  - the Univerzitetski tele-informatički centar (UTIC, University Tele-Informatics Centre) at the University of Sarajevo is the .ba domain administrator.
- Fixed Internet: 907,951 subscriptions (2023)
  - Internet Users: 3,374,094 (95.55% of the population) (2021)
  - 907,951 broadband subscriptions (2023)
    - 455,381 digital subscriber line subscriptions (2023)
    - 270,869 cable modem subscriptions (2023)
    - 65,331 fixed wireless access (FWA) subscriptions (2023)
    - 2,096 leased line subscriptions (2023)
    - 114,251 fibre to the home (FTTH) subscriptions (2023)
    - 23 other fixed broadband subscriptions (2023)
- Internet hosts: 155,252 hosts, 77th in the world
- Internet service providers (ISPs): 63 (2023)

=== Internet censorship and surveillance ===
There are no government restrictions on access to the Internet or reports that the government monitors e-mail or Internet chat rooms.

The Press Council of Bosnia and Herzegovina is the organization responsible for self-regulation of online and print media content. In 2012 the Press Council considered 176 complaints alleging inaccurate or libelous reporting by print and online media (103 for print and 73 for online media), accepting 35 as valid and rejecting 19 as unfounded.

The law provides for freedom of speech and press; however, the government does not always respect press freedom in practice. The Federation of Bosnia and Herzegovina law prohibits hate speech. The Republika Srpska law does not specifically proscribe hate speech, although the law prohibits causing ethnic, racial, or religious hatred. Independent analysts note a continuing tendency of politicians and other leaders to label unwanted criticism as hate speech.

The law prohibits arbitrary interference with privacy, family, home, or correspondence, and the government generally respects these prohibitions in practice.

== See also ==
- Media of Bosnia and Herzegovina
- Radio and Television of Bosnia and Herzegovina (BHRT).
- Radio-Television of the Republic of Srpska (RTRS), entity level radio and television broadcaster in Republika Srpska
- Radio-Television of the Federation of Bosnia and Herzegovina (RTVFBiH), public radio and television broadcaster.

== Public domain material ==
- This article incorporates material from websites or documents of the Communications Regulatory Agency of Bosnia and Herzegovina (Regulatorna agencija za komunikacije Bosne i Hercegovine) "2012 editions".
