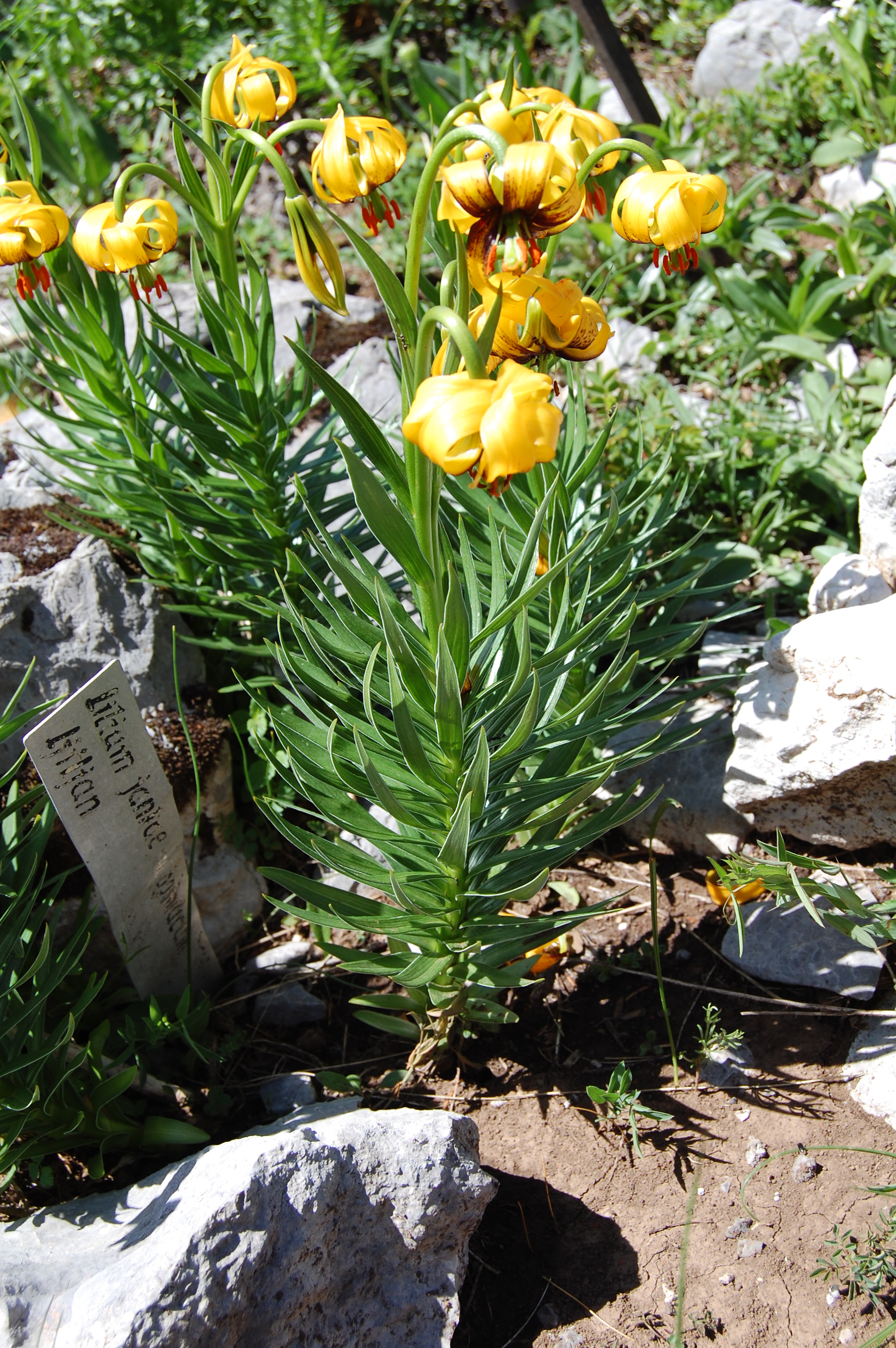

Scientific classification
- Kingdom: Plantae
- Clade: Embryophytes
- Clade: Tracheophytes
- Clade: Spermatophytes
- Clade: Angiosperms
- Clade: Monocots
- Order: Liliales
- Family: Liliaceae
- Subfamily: Lilioideae
- Genus: Lilium
- Species: L. bosniacum

Binomial name
- Lilium bosniacum (Beck) Fritsch

= Lilium bosniacum =

Species of lily

Lilium bosniacum is a lily native to Bosnia and Herzegovina. It is also known as zlatni ljiljan (Bosnian for golden lily) and Bosanski ljiljan (Bosnian lily).

L. bosniacum has often been lumped and split and lumped again. Some results of molecular studies support it as an infraspecific taxon of Lilium carniolicum. Lilium bosniacum, together with Lilium albanicum and Lilium jankae have been treated as varieties of Lilium carniolicum.

However, extensive DNA-analyses have shown that this group is polyphyletic.

== Description ==
Lilium bosniacum Beck ex Fritsch 1909 Section 3b Syn.: L. carniolicum var. bosniacumno

Bulb: ovoid, 6–7 cm in diameter, yellowish.

Stem: 30–90 cm.

Leaves: densely scattered, horizontal with tips curved upwards, narrowly lanceolate with slightly hairy margins.

Flowers: 1–6 in a raceme, nodding, fragrant. Tepals strongly revolute, typical Turk's cap-shape, wax-like texture, yellow to orange without spots, ~6 cm in diameter. Seeds with delayed hypogeal germination. Flowering time ~July. 2n=24.

Origin: Bosnia and Herzegovina.

== Symbolic use ==
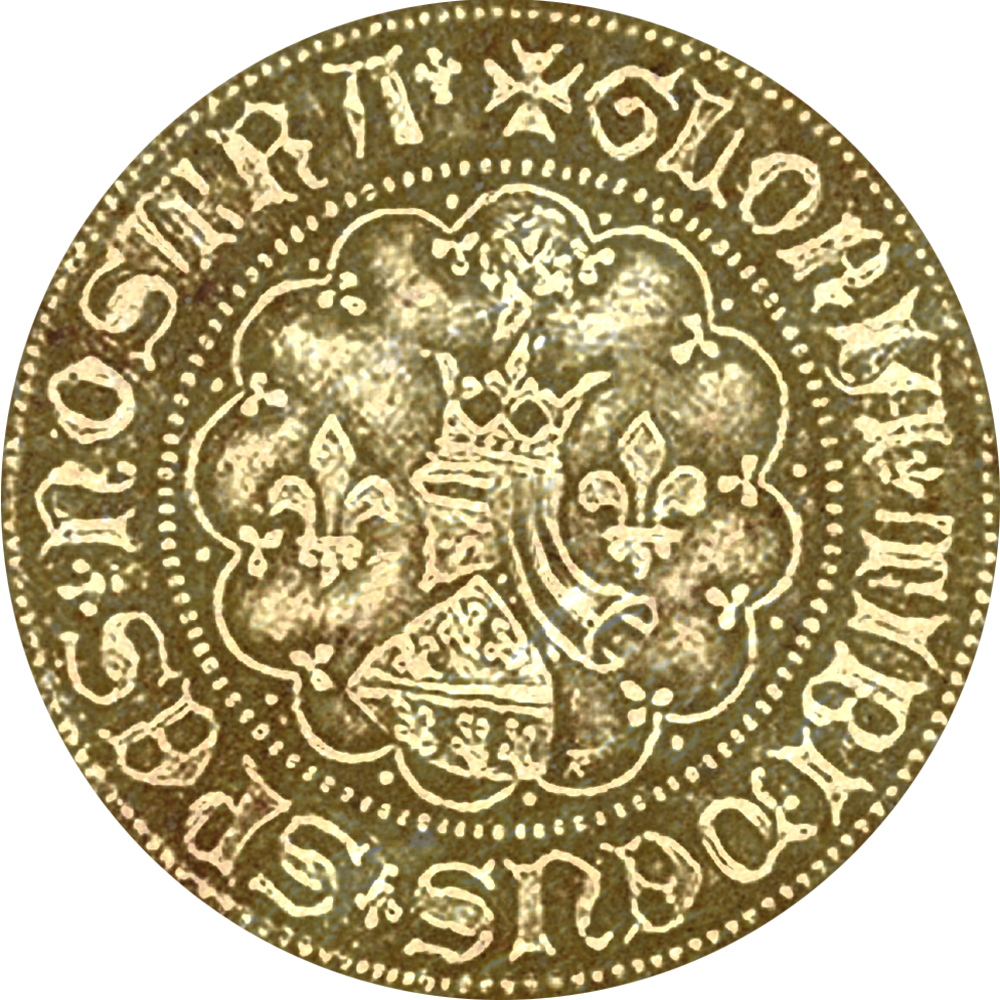
Bosnian king Tvrtko I's gold coin (14th century) reverse – with the Bosnian state fleur-de-lis coat of arms. (GLORIA TIBI DEUS SPES NOSTRA)

The fleurs-de-lis was the symbol of the House of Kotromanić, a ruling house in medieval Bosnia during the medieval Kingdom of Bosnia, adopted by the first Bosnian king, Tvrtko I, in recognition of the Capetian House of Anjou support in assuming the throne of Bosnia. The coat of arms contained six fleurs-de-lis, where the flower itself is today interpreted by some to be a representation of the autochthonous golden lily, Lilium bosniacum.

The emblem was revived in 1992 as a national symbol of the Republic of Bosnia and Herzegovina and was part of the flag of Bosnia-Herzegovina from 1992 to 1998. The state insignia were changed in 1999. The former flag of the Federation of Bosnia and Herzegovina contains a fleur-de-lis alongside the Croatian chequy. Fleurs also appear in the flags and arms of many cantons, municipalities, cities and towns. Today, it is a traditional symbol of the Bosniak people. It is still used as official insignia of the Bosniak Regiment of the Armed Forces of Bosnia and Herzegovina.

Fleurs-de-lis today also appear in the flags and arms of many cantons, municipalities, cities and towns of Bosnia and Herzegovina.

Coat of arms of the Kingdom of Bosnia (1377–1463)

Coat of arms of Republic of Bosnia and Herzegovina

== See also ==
- Coat of arms of Bosnia and Herzegovina
- List of Balkan endemic plants
