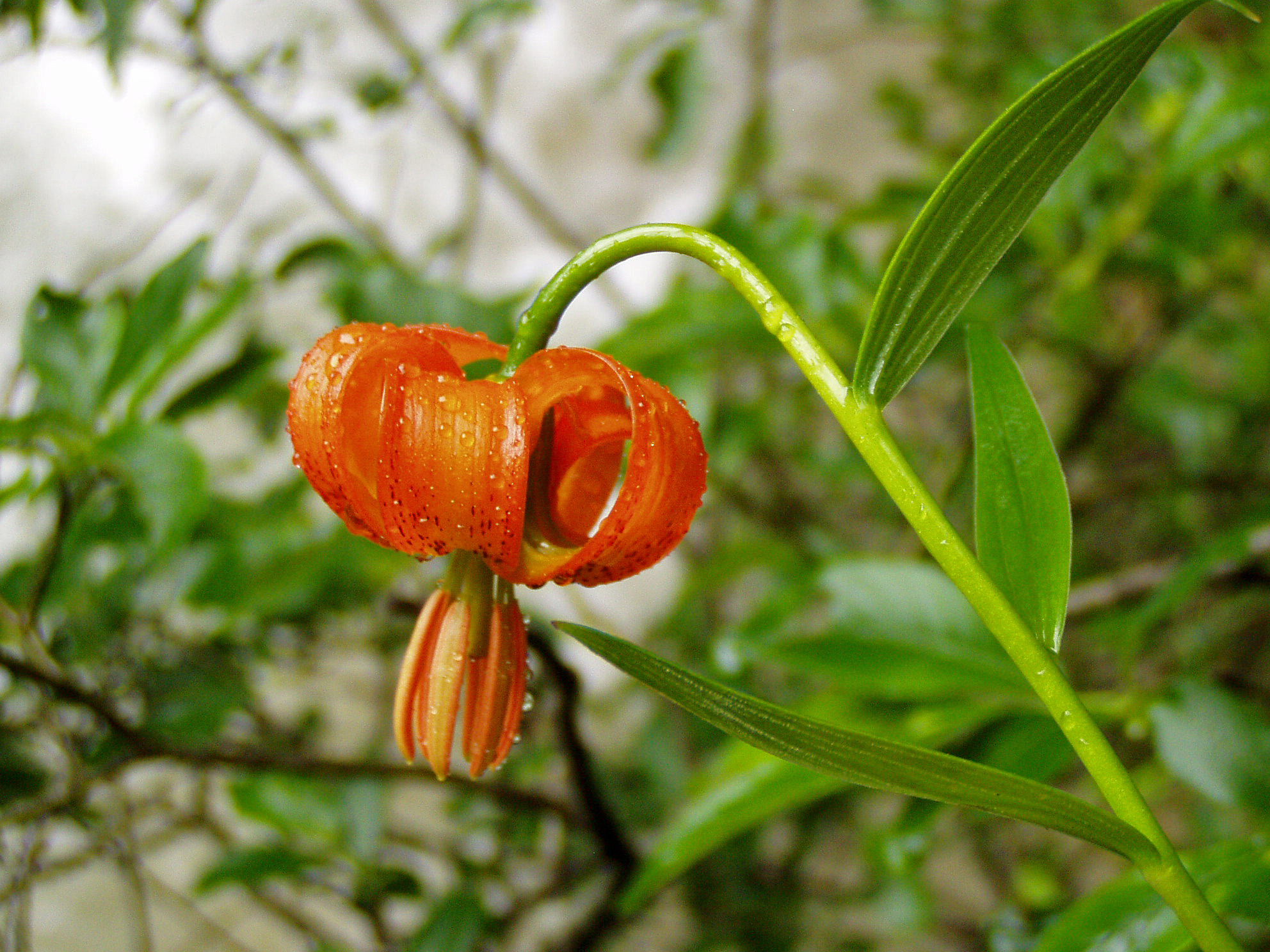

Scientific classification
- Kingdom: Plantae
- Clade: Tracheophytes
- Clade: Angiosperms
- Clade: Monocots
- Order: Liliales
- Family: Liliaceae
- Subfamily: Lilioideae
- Tribe: Lilieae
- Genus: Lilium
- Species: L. carniolicum

Binomial name
- Lilium carniolicum Bernh. ex W.D.J.Koch

Synonyms
- Lilium pomponium var. carniolicum (Bernh. ex W.D.J.Koch) Fiori; Lilium pyrenaicum subsp. carniolicum (Bernh. ex W.D.J.Koch) V.A.Matthews

= Lilium carniolicum =

Species of plant

Lilium carniolicum, commonly called golden apple or Carniolan lily, is a species of flowering plant in the family Liliaceae. It is a lily native to the Balkans, as well as to Austria and northeastern Italy (Veneto + Friuli-Venezia Giulia). The species is named after the historical region of Carniola, comprising parts of modern-day Slovenia, where it is most abundant.

Its flowers vary in colour from red to yellow, speckled on the bottom with black dots. The colour can vary even among flowers growing in the same locality. In general, yellow is predominant in the southern part of the range. There, the species is sometimes split into the closely related Lilium bosniacum, Lilium albanicum and Lilium jankae, but those are usually treated as varieties of Lilium carniolicum.
