= Golden apple (disambiguation) =

Golden apple is a story element in various ancient mythologies.

Golden Apple may also refer to:

== Fruit ==
- Spondias mombin, a fruit also sometimes referred to as the golden apple
- Golden Delicious, an apple cultivar
- Quince, a fruit also known as golden apple
- Spondias dulcis, a tropical fruit tree, also known as golden apple
- Aegle marmelos, a tropical fruit tree, also known as golden apple
- Tomato, a fruit, also known as golden apple in Italian, Russian and other languages

== Media ==
- The Golden Apple (musical), a 1954 musical based on parts of the Odyssey and the Iliad
- The Golden Apple, middle part of The Illuminatus! Trilogy novel series by Robert J. Shea and Robert A. Wilson
- Golden Apple Award, an American award for entertainers
- Golden Apple (TV series), a South Korean television drama series
- Golden Apples, a 1935 novel by Marjorie Kinnan Rawlings
- The Golden Apples, a 1949 short story collection by Eudora Welty

== Other ==
- Golden Apple Award (education), a teaching award presented by various schools
- Golden Apple Comics, a California-based chain of comic book store
- Ampullariidae, a type of snail, also known as golden apple snail
- Common name of the lily Lilium carniolicum
