= Jelena Trivan =

Serbian politician

- Јелена Триван
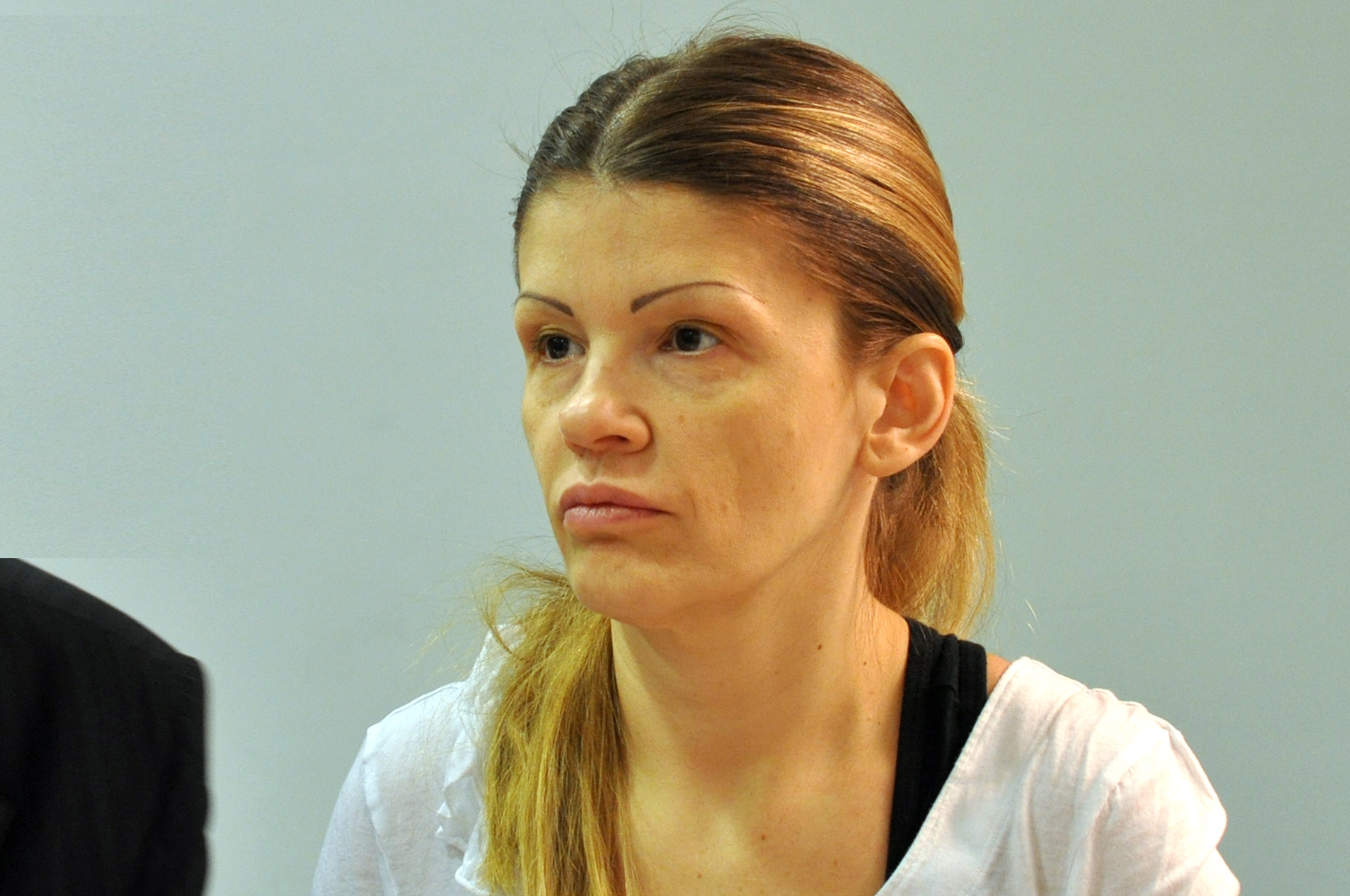
- Trivan in 2011

Member of the National Assembly
- In office 2007–2013

Personal details
- Born: April 4, 1973 (age 53) Kosovska Mitrovica, SR Serbia, SFR Yugoslavia
- Party: DS (until 2014)
- Profession: Politician

Jelena Trivan (Serbian Cyrillic: Јелена Триван; born 4 April 1973) is a Serbian former politician. She served as a Member of the National Assembly of Serbia between 2007 and 2013 and was previously the vice-president of the Democratic Party until 2012, when she resigned. She later left the party in 2014. Since 2018, she has been serving as the President of Board of Directors of the Film Center of Serbia.

Trivan was announced as the new general director of Telekom Srpske (Mtel) from 15 September 2021, replacing Marko Lopičić. Mtel is the second largest telecommunications company in Bosnia and Herzegovina.
