= Geology of Bosnia and Herzegovina =

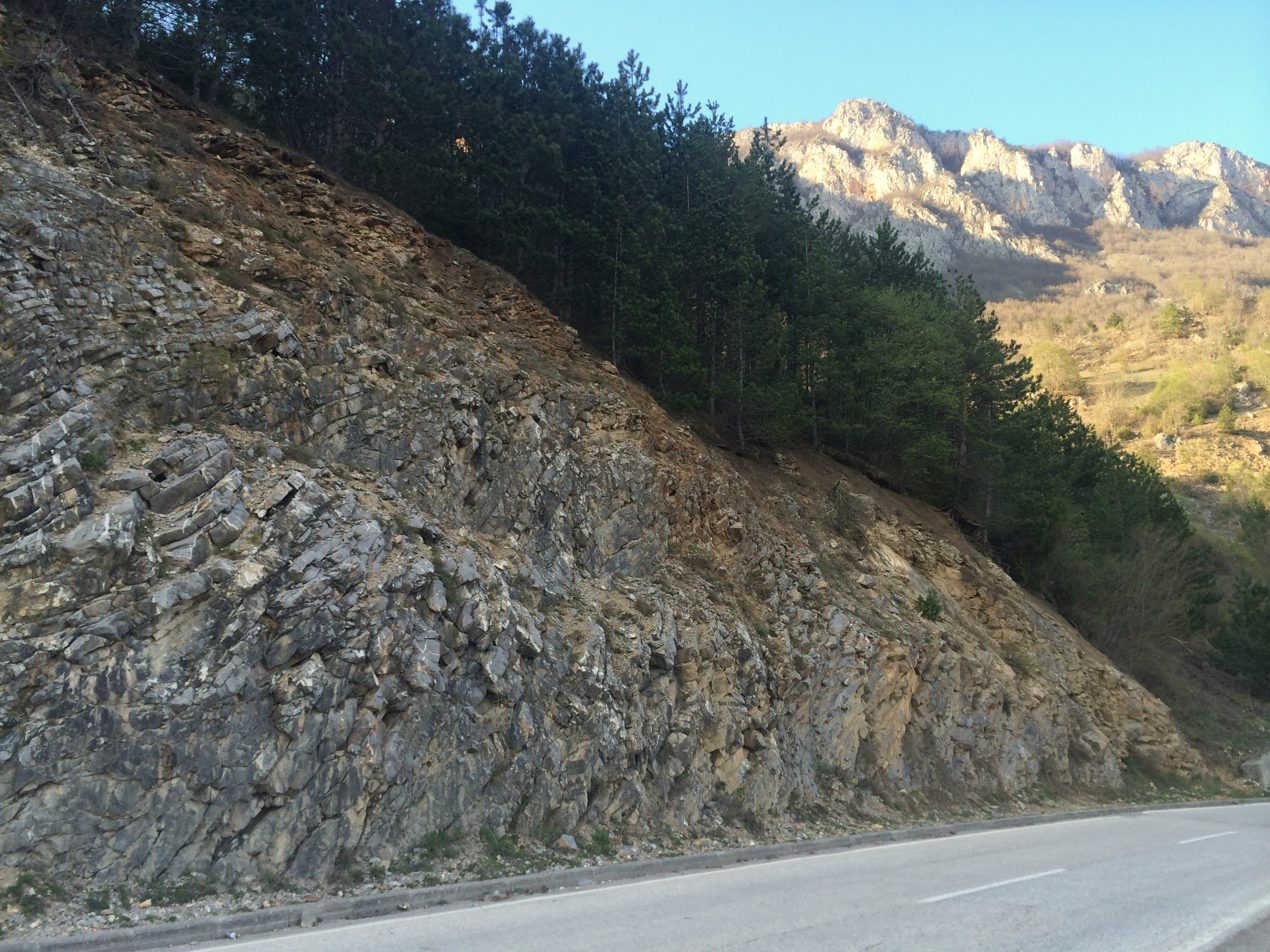
Tilted layers of limestone beside the R467 road at Donja Strmica

The geology of Bosnia and Herzegovina is the study of rocks, minerals, water, landforms and geologic history in the country. The oldest rocks exposed at or near the surface of Bosnia and Herzegovina date to the Paleozoic and the Precambrian geologic history of the region remains poorly understood. Complex assemblages of flysch, ophiolite, mélange and igneous plutons together with thick sedimentary units are a defining characteristic of the Dinaric Alps, also known as the Dinaride Mountains, which dominate much of the country's landscape.

== Stratigraphy, tectonics and geologic history ==
=== Paleozoic (538.8–251.9 million years ago) ===
Paleozoic allochthon formations are found in the lower rock units in the northeast margin of the Dinarides. These rocks are found in isolated areas in the northwest, central, eastern and southeastern Bosnia and are made up of metapsammite, metapelite and smaller amounts of volcanic and carbonate rock. The Southeastern Paleozoic Zone comprises phyllite, schistose metasandstone and crystalline limestone, overlain by slate and more phyllite.

Permian rocks are mainly red beds with slate, metasandstone, limestones, gypsum, anhydrite and conglomerates.

=== Mesozoic (251.9–66 million years ago) ===
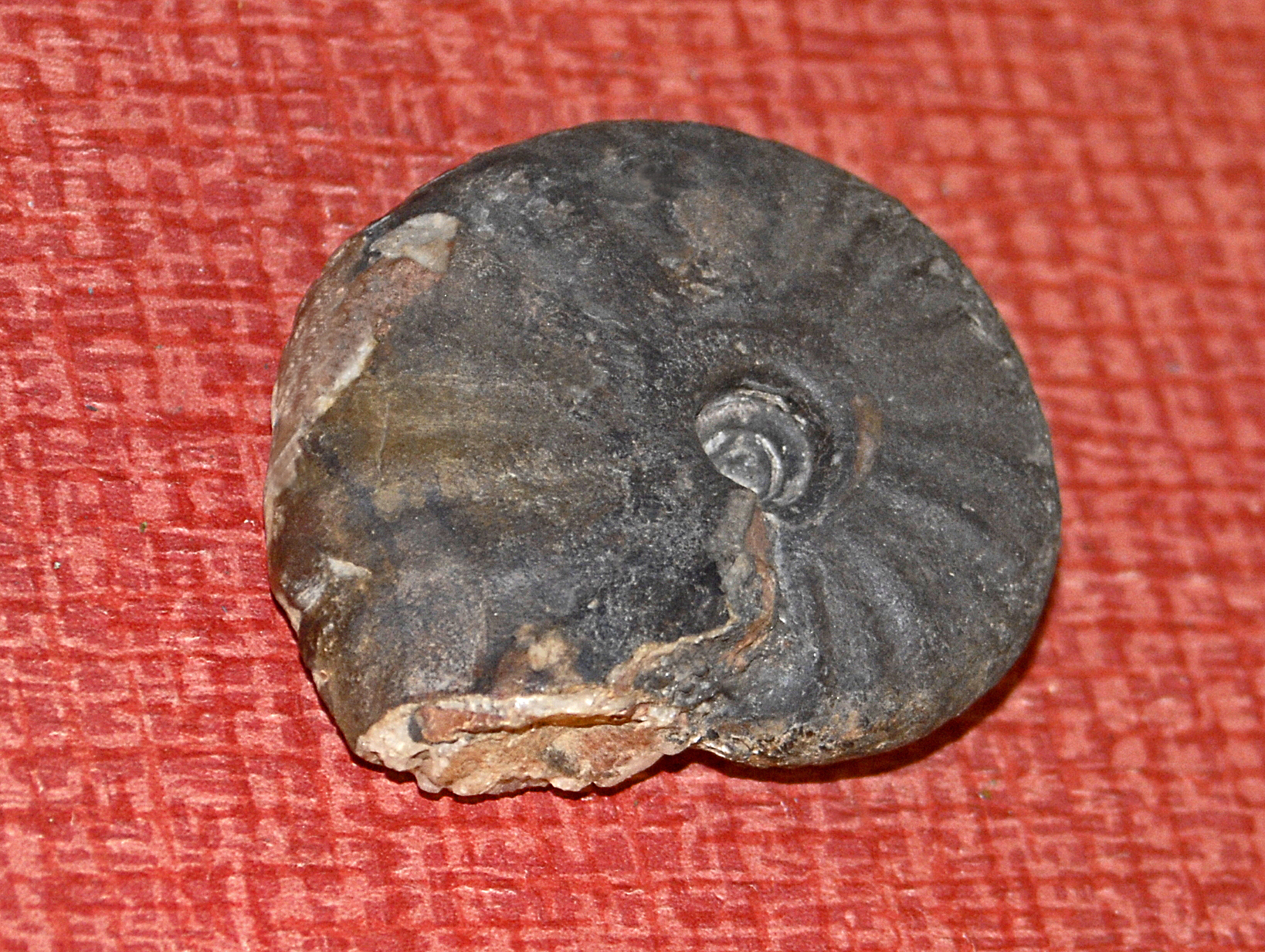
Ptychites studeri ammonoid fossil from Triassic rocks in Bosnia

During the Triassic, rifting emplaced igneous rocks, including large plutons up to 50 cubic kilometers in size, made up of gabbro, diorite, granodiorite, granite, albite, syenite and occasionally metamorphosed to greenschist or amphibolite-grade on the sequence of metamorphic facies.

True volcanic rocks from the Triassic that erupted onto the surface are less common, mainly basalt, andesite and dacite, transformed into spilite, keratophyre and pyroclastic rocks. Older Triassic rocks and the carbonate platform were covered over by lava. Graywacke, breccia, shale and chert and ophiolite are widespread in the Ophiolite Zone, in northwestern and central Bosnia. The Ophiolite Zone outcrops as "windows" within the Triassic-Paleozoic unit, and the unit is 1.5 kilometers thick. The mélange in this chaotic sedimentary sequence contains fragments of gabbro, diabase, peridotite, basalt and amphibolite, together with Tithonian age limestone fragments.

Peridotite is one of the most common rocks in the ophiolites, with large deformed sheets up to 500 cubic kilometers in size. Mt. Konjuh is an example of a large ultramafic body, underlain by amphibolites associated with eclogite. Amphibolites interlayed with peridotite have been dated to 170 to 160 million years ago.

Ultramafic massifs in the Ophiolite Zone are unconformably overlain by Late Jurassic and Late Cretaceous sandstones, marl, shale and limestone up to one kilometer thick. These sequences interfinger with Tithonian-Berriasian, Albian and Senonian limestones. Coarse-grained clastic rocks contain fragments of ophiolite, amphibolite, greywacke, shale, chert, limestone and pebbles of red granite. In the northern Dinaride Mountains, the end of the Cretaceous in the Vardar Zone is marked by Turonian limestones.

=== Cenozoic (66 million years ago-present) ===
In the northern Dinaride Mountains, flysch several meters thick grades from Maastrichtian sandstone, siltstone and shale into Paleocene calcite shale, calcareous sandstone, sandy limestones and limestones. The flysch is overlain by more limestone from the Middle Eocene.

In some cases, the interlayering of Late Cretaceous-Paleogene flysch with volcanic rocks has resulted in medium-pressure metamorphism. Rock sequences prograde from sandstone, shale, marl and limestone to slate and meta-sandstone along with greenschist, mica schist, amphibolite, gneiss and phyllite. Small and medium-sized plutons are found in the subsurface, within the metamorphic rock. Strontium-argon dating of the Motajica granitoid returned an age of 48 million years ago. After the formation of the Dinaride Mountains, the South Pannonian Basin filled with the Ottnangian-Karpathian rock salt formation up to 700 meters thick, the Badenian marine clays, sandstones, conglomerates and reef limestones, Sarmatian brackish clays, and the Pannonian and Pontian freshwater sand and clay deposits, up to two kilometers thick with coal seams. The same Oligocene deposition that filled the South Pannonian Basin deposited sedimentary fill several kilometers thick in freshwater basins between the mountains. Geologists divide the freshwater deposits into Oligocene and Miocene conglomerates, coal seams, sandstone, limestone and marl, early Miocene clays and sandstone overlain by limestone, and late Miocene marl, limestone and coal.

== History of geologic research ==
The first widespread research in Bosnia was led by Austrian and Croatian geologists in the 1880s, with maps published in the 1910s. During the Yugoslav period after World War II, extensive mining prompted additional exploration. French geologists took a leading role in research from the late 1960s into the 1970s.

== Natural resource geology ==
Bosnia and Herzegovina has a long tradition of mining stretching back over 2000 years to Illyrian and Roman times. In particular, metals are mined from the Paleozoic-Triassic Nappe, which formed during the Caledonian orogeny, Hercynian orogeny and the Triassic. Early Paleozoic rocks contain metapelite and metapsammite, as well as low quality hematite and magnetite. The Ljubija mines have traditionally extracted Carboniferous siderite-ankerite deposits, enriched in iron.
