= National symbols of Bosnia and Herzegovina =

Bosnia and Herzegovina and its flag

The national symbols of Bosnia and Herzegovina are flags, icons or cultural expressions that are emblematic, representative or otherwise characteristic of Bosnia and Herzegovina or culture of nations in Bosnia and Herzegovina. As a rule, these symbols are cultural icons that have emerged from folklore and tradition of nations in Bosnia and Herzegovina, meaning few have any official status.

== Flags ==
Flag of the State of Bosnia and Herzegovina. A wide medium blue vertical band on the fly side with a yellow right triangle abutting the band and the top of the flag; the remainder of the flag is medium blue with seven full five-pointed white stars and two half stars top and bottom along the hypotenuse of the triangle. The three points of the triangle are understood to stand for the three constituent peoples of Bosnia and Herzegovina: Bosniaks, Croats, and Serbs.

== Heraldry ==
The coat of arms of Bosnia and Herzegovina was adopted in 1998, replacing the previous design that had been in use since 1992 when Bosnia and Herzegovina gained independence, and follows the design of the national flag. The three pointed shield is specific and is to symbolize the three major ethnic groups of Bosnia, as well as allude to the shape of the country. The stars were adopted to replace the fleur de lys.
Fleur-de-lis. The coat of arms of the medieval Kingdom of Bosnia contained six fleurs-de-lis, likely drawing inspiration from the native Bosnian or Golden Lily, Lilium bosniacum. This emblem was revived in 1992 as a national symbol of the Republic of Bosnia and Herzegovina (mainly for Bosniaks) and was on the flag of Bosnia and Herzegovina from 1992 to 1995. Today, symbol appears in the flags and arms of many cantons, municipalities, cities and towns of Bosnia and Herzegovina and is used by Bosniaks as their national symbol.

== Anthem ==
Državna himna Bosne i Hercegovine is the national anthem of Bosnia and Herzegovina. It is one of the two national anthems (along with that of Spain) in the world to have no official lyrics. The anthem was adopted on 25 June 1999, by the promulgation of the Law on the National Anthem of Bosnia and Herzegovina, replacing the previous anthem, Jedna si jedina

== Flora and fauna ==
Lilium bosniacum is a lily native to Bosnia and Herzegovina. It's also known as Golden Lily (Serbian, Bosnian, Croatian: Zlatni ljiljan) and Bosnian Lily (Serbian, Bosnian, Croatian: Bosanski ljiljan). The Golden Lily is a symbol of the Bosnian Kingdom and Bosnia. The Coat of arms used by the members of the House of Kotromanić, sovereigns of medieval Bosnia and the surrounding lands, consisted of six golden lilies on a blue background with a white ribbon. Today is used as the national symbol of Bosniak community.

== Food and drink ==
Ćevapi is a grilled dish of minced meat, a type of kebab, found traditionally in the countries of southeastern Europe. They are considered a national dish in Bosnia and Herzegovina.
Burek is a meat-filled flaky pastry, traditionally rolled in a spiral and cut into sections for serving. The same dish filled with cottage cheese is called sirnica, one with spinach zeljanica, and one with potatoes krompiruša. All these varieties are generically referred to as pita (Serbian, Bosnian and Croatian for pie).
Sarma is a dish of grape, cabbage or chard leaves rolled around a filling usually based on minced meat, or a sweet dish of filo dough wrapped around a filling often of various kinds of chopped nuts. The Bosnian type includes rice and minced meat, as well as dried smoked beef.
The Livno cheese is a cheese first produced in the 19th century in the area of Livno, region of Tropolje, on the basis of French technology of making the Gruyère cheese. Originally, it was made from sheep's milk and nowadays it is mainly made from a mixture of sheep's and cow's milk.
Bosnian coffee is a type of Turkish coffee. Difference from the Turkish preparation is that when the water reaches its boiling point, a small amount is saved aside for later, usually in a coffee cup. Then, the coffee is added to the pot (džezva), and the remaining water in the cup is added to the pot. Everything is put back on the heat source to reach its boiling point again, which only takes a couple of seconds since the coffee is already very hot. Coffee drinking in Bosnia is a traditional daily custom and plays an important role during social gatherings.

== People ==
Saint Elijah has been the patron saint of Bosnia and Herzegovina since 1752.
Tvrtko I was a medieval Bosnian ruler and a member of the House of Kotromanić. He was ban during 1353-1377, king of Serbia and Bosnia during 1377-1391, and king of Croatia and Dalmatia after 1390. He was a "politically adept and religiously tolerant ruler" and under his command Bosnia reached its peak and became the strongest power in the Balkans. He centralized the state and conquered parts of medieval Serbia, Croatia, Dalmatia, Hum, Kotor, Zeta, and the territory of present-day Raška.
Blessed Catherine of Bosnia was Queen of Bosnia as the wife of King Stephen Thomas. In her will she left the claim to the Kingdom to the Holy See but only should her children 'not return to the Christian faith'. Her children did not return to Christianity so she is often called "the last queen of Bosnia", although the last to hold the title was actually Catherine's stepdaughter-in-law, Mary of Serbia. The memory of Queen Catherine, who was beatified after her death, is still alive in Central Bosnia, where Catholics traditionally mark 25 October with a mass in Bobovac at the altar of the homeland.
Diva Grabovčeva is a Roman Catholic virgin martyr, a symbol of the resistance of Bosnian and Herzegovinian Catholics against the Turks.
Kulin Ban was the Ban of Bosnia from 1180 to 1204. He is Bosnia's most prominent and notable ruler. His most noteworthy diplomatic achievement was the Charter of Ban Kulin (Povelja Kulina Bana), which encouraged trade and established peaceful relations between the Banate of Bosnia the Republic of Ragusa.

== Architecture ==
Stećak is a monumental medieval tombstone, found scattered across the countryside of Bosnia and Herzegovina, grouped in numerous old necropoleis.
Stari Most (English: Old Bridge) is a reconstructed 16th-century Ottoman bridge in the city of Mostar in Bosnia and Herzegovina that crosses the river Neretva and connects two parts of the city. The Old Bridge stood for 427 years, until it was destroyed on 9 November 1993 by HVO during the Croat–Bosniak War. Subsequently, a project was set in motion to reconstruct it, and the rebuilt bridge opened on 23 July 2004. One of the country's most recognizable landmarks, it is also considered one of the most exemplary pieces of Islamic architecture in the Balkans and was designed by Mimar Hayruddin, a student and apprentice of the famous architect Mimar Sinan. The bridge and surrounding Old Town are inscribed into UNESCO register of World Heritage Sites.
The Mehmed Paša Sokolović Bridge (Bosnian: Most Mehmed-paše Sokolovića) is a historic bridge in Višegrad, over the Drina River in eastern Bosnia and Herzegovina. It was completed in 1577 by the Ottoman court architect Mimar Sinan on the order of the Grand Vizier Mehmed Paša Sokolović. UNESCO included the facility in its 2007 World Heritage List.
The Sacred Heart Cathedral (Croatian: Katedrala Srca Isusova) in Sarajevo, commonly referred as the Sarajevo Cathedral is the largest cathedral in Bosnia and Herzegovina. It is the seat of the Archbishop of Vrhbosna, currently Cardinal Vinko Puljić, and center of Catholic worship in the city. The Cathedral is located in the city's Old Town district. It was designed by Josip Vancaš as a triple-aisled church in the eclectic manner, with neo-Gothic elements predominating. The tomb of Josip Stadler, the first Archbishop of Vrhbosna, is located in the Cathedral.
The Gazi Husrev-beg Mosque (Bosnian: Gazi Husrev-begova Džamija, Turkish: Gazi Hüsrev Bey Camii), is a mosque in the city of Sarajevo, Bosnia and Herzegovina. It is considered the most important Islamic structure in the country and one of the world's finest examples of Ottoman architecture. It is located in the Baščaršija neighborhood in the Stari Grad municipality, and remains one of the most popular centers of worship in the city.
Sarajevo Synagogue (Serbo-Croatian: Sarajevska sinagoga) is Sarajevo's primary and largest synagogue and is located on the south bank of the river Miljacka. It was built in 1902 in an elaborate Moorish Revival style. Designed by Karel Pařík, its highly decorated neo-Moorish style was a popular choice for synagogues in the Austro-Hungarian Empire. It is the only functioning synagogue in Sarajevo today.

== Other symbols ==
Bosnian Cyrillic widely known as Bosančica is an extinct type of the Cyrillic alphabet that originated in Bosnia and Herzegovina. It was widely used in Bosnia and Herzegovina and the bordering areas in Croatia (southern Dalmatia and Dubrovnik regions).
