= Mtel Bosnia and Herzegovina =

Telecommunications company in Bosnia and Herzegovina

m:tel
- Official logo

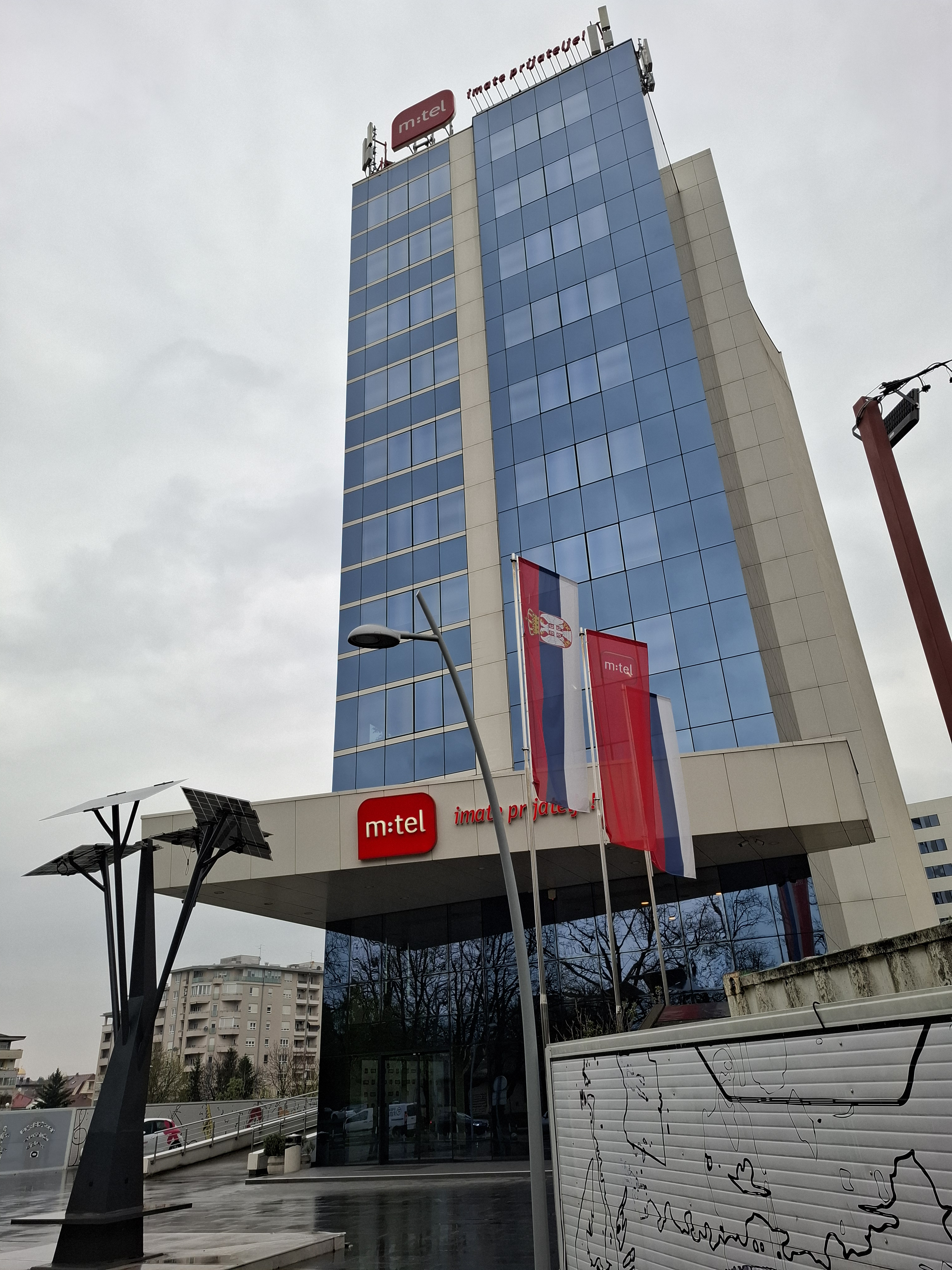
- Mtel HQ, Banja Luka
- Formerly: Telekom Srpske
- Type: Joint-stock company
- Traded as: BLSE: TLKM-R-A
- Industry: Telecommunications
- Founded: 20 December 1996; 29 years ago (Founded)
- Headquarters: Vuka Karadžića 2, Banja Luka, Bosnia and Herzegovina
- Key people: Jelena Trivan (General director)
- Services: Fixed and mobile lines, internet provider, ADSL, IPTV
- Revenue: ▲856.61 million KM (2023)
- Net income: ▲354.47 million KM (2023)
- Total assets: ▲1.7586 billion KM (2023)
- Total equity: ▲1.03377 billion KM (2023)
- Number of employees: 2,621 (2023)
- Website: mtel.ba

Telekomunikacije Republike Srpske a.d. Banja Luka, doing business as m:tel, is a telecommunications company based in Banja Luka, Republika Srpska, Bosnia and Herzegovina. The company is owned by Telekom Srbija, and is the second largest telecommunications company in Bosnia and Herzegovina and the biggest one listed on the Banja Luka Stock Exchange, with a market capitalisation of about 300 million euros as of April, 2025.

== History ==
Telekom Srpske was established on 20 December 1996. It was privatized in 2006, through a public tender. Telekom Srbija, made the highest bid with €646 million for a 65% majority stake, while the second highest bidder was Telekom Austria with an offer of 467 million euros.

The Government of Republika Srpska declared Telekom Srpske a company of strategic importance and, therefore, the state capital has been privatised according to the special privatisation program enacted by the Government. Raiffeisen Investment was appointed as the financial advisor to the government. The criteria that potential bidders had to fulfil, included a current minimum of 800,000 fixed-line and 1.5m mobile users, suggesting that the Government is hoping for an outside operator who is capable of investing in Telekom Srpske's infrastructure.

The company's main business is fixed and mobile telecommunications in domestic and international traffic. Other businesses include:

- directory inquires
- internet services provider
- design, construction, reconstruction and installation of TC devices, etc.

== Ownership structure ==
The ownership structure of the company is as follows (as of 31 December 2017):

- Telekom Srbija – 65.01%
- Pension and Disability Insurance Fund – 8.92%
- Restitution Fund – 5.03%
- DUIF Krist.Invest a.d. – 3.30%
- Other shareholders – 17.74%

== Subsidiaries ==
The company owns the founding status shares in three companies, with a 100% ownership of the company "Telekard telefonske usluge", d.o.o. Banja Luka and TT "Inženjering" d.o.o. Banja Luka, and 20% of share in the Institute for International Law and International Cooperation, d.o.o. Banja Luka.

== See also ==
- List of mobile network operators in Europe
