= Environment of Bosnia and Herzegovina =

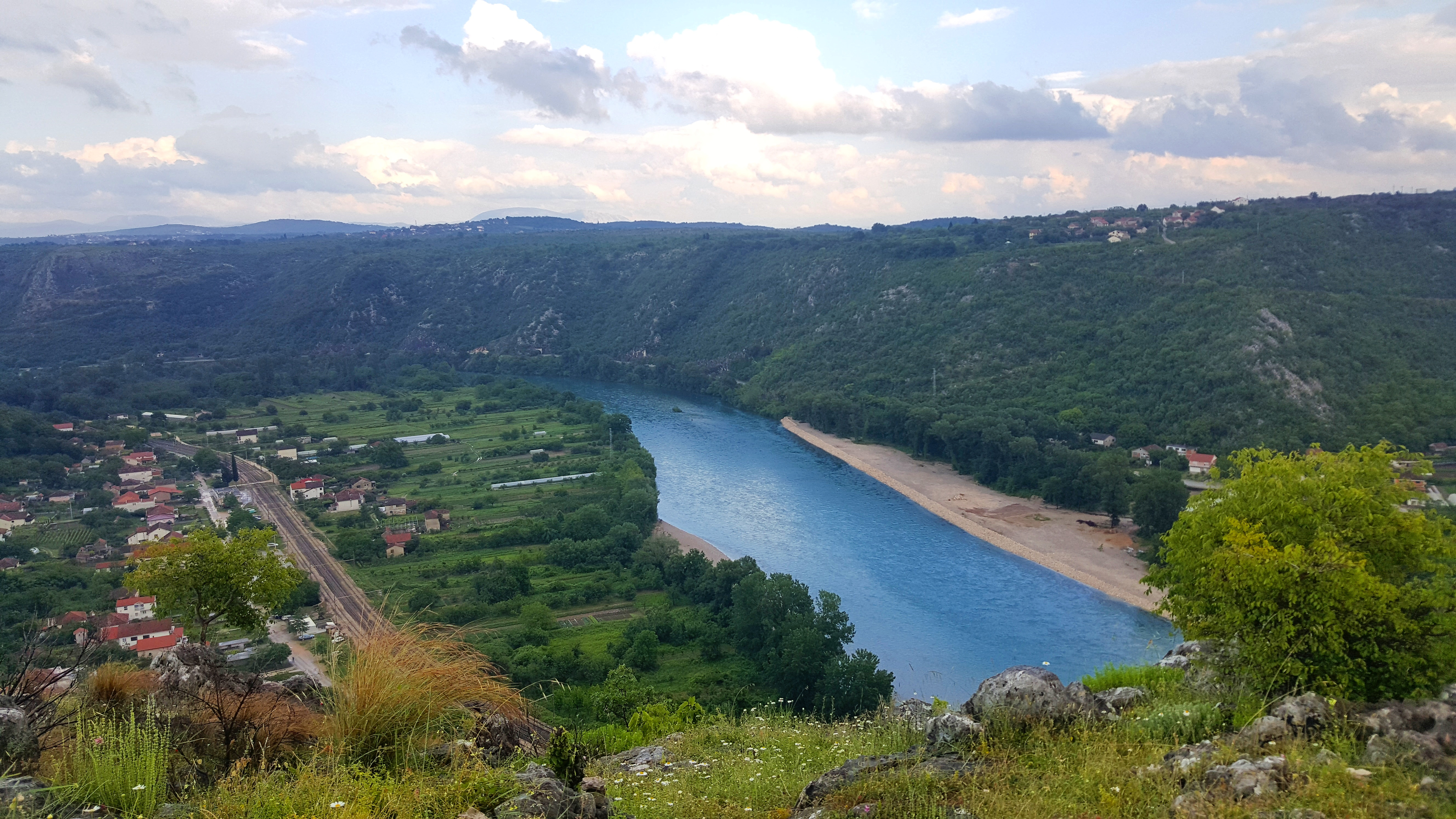
The river Neretva in the summer

The environment of Bosnia and Herzegovina consists of diverse climates, flora and fauna, natural landmarks and landscapes. The climate ranges from continental, oceanic, subtropical and Mediterranean through the country. Most of the Dinaric Alps are located in Bosnia and Herzegovina, the highest elevation point is the mountain Maglić at 2,386 meters (7,828 ft), while the lowest point of elevation is the Adriatic Sea in the south of the country. 42.8% of the land is covered in thick forests. The country is rich in water resources, and in some places, rivers and springs may be used without filtration. Significant rivers are the Drina, Neretva, Sava, Bosna and Una. Important national parks include Kozara National Park, Sutjeska National Park, and Una National Park, all nationally protected areas.

== Biodiversity ==
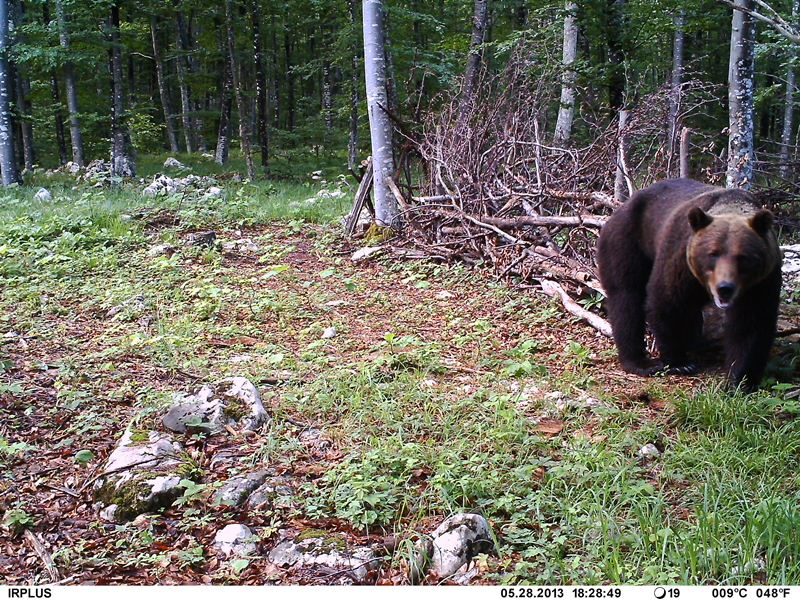
A Eurasian brown bear in Una National Park.

Bosnia and Herzegovina's abundance of biodiversity is due to multiple factors, such as diversity of soil types, diversity of bedrock, diversity of climatic conditions, spatial and ecological heterogeneity, geomorphologic and hydrological diversity. The floristic diversity is reflected in the high numbers of cyanophytes, algae and vascular plants. 1,859 species from 217 genera have been identified within groups of cyanophytes and algae. More than 450 species and sub-species of vascular plants are endemic while more than 5,000 different species and sub-species of vascular plants, more than 100 species of fish, over 320 species of birds have been identified in the region.

== Forests and mountains ==
=== Forests ===
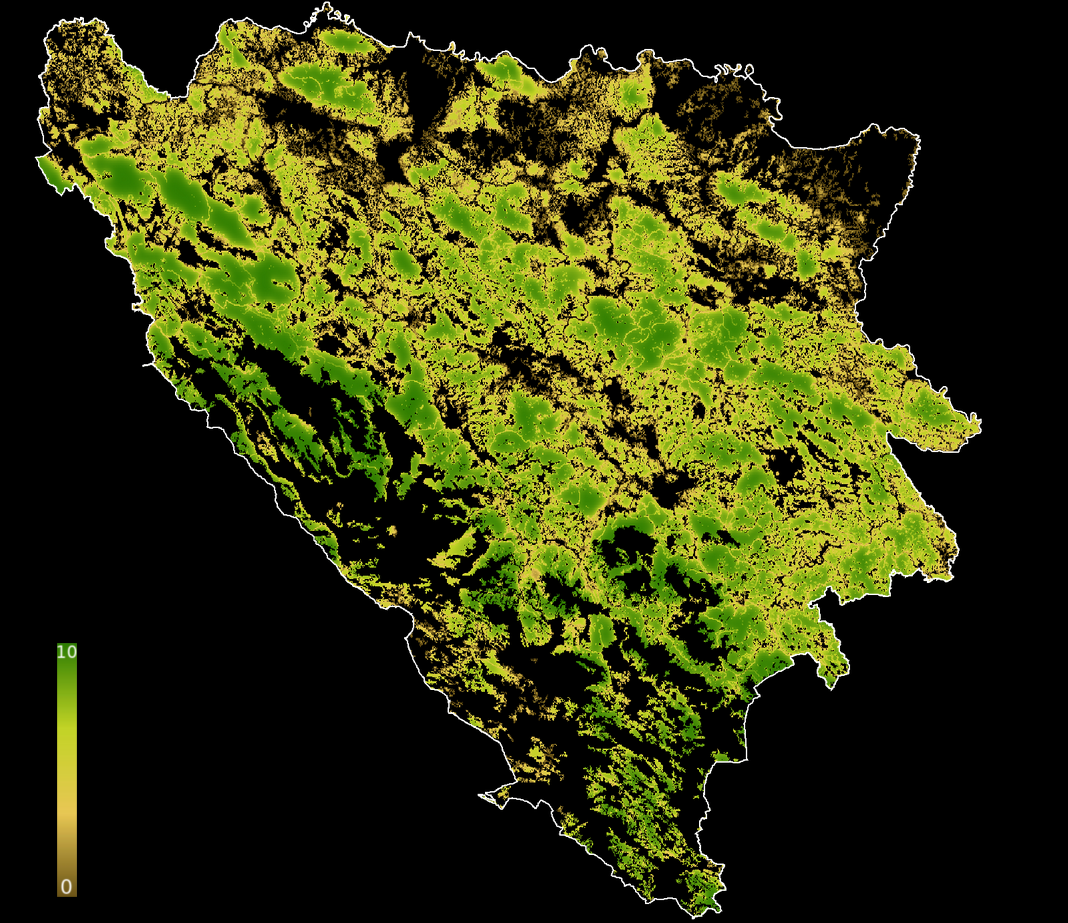
Forest Landscape Integrity Index map of Bosnia and Herzegovina

The forests of Bosnia and Herzegovina are varied in type: from coastal Mediterranean to mountain forests in the center of the country. Coniferous forests are found in the highlands, mixed forests in the mid altitudes and broadleaved forests in the low-level terrains and floodplains. They play an important role biodiversity and habitat protection as well as for producing forest goods. The diversity in forest types is mirrored in the existence of 9 out of 13 of the European Environmental Agency categories. Those include:

- Category 4 - Acidophilous oak forests
- Category 5 - Mesophytic deciduous forest
- Category 6 - Beech forest
- Category 7 - Mountainous beech forest
- Category 8 - Thermophilous deciduous forest
- Category 9 - Broadleaved evergreen forest
- Category 10 - Coniferous forests of the Mediterranean, Anatolian and Macaronesian regions
- Category 11 - Mire and swamp forest
- Category 12 - Floodplain forest

Human-induced damages as a consequence of poor management, over-exploitation, illegal logging and air pollution, as well as forest fires are the biggest dangers to these forests. High discrepancies exist between harvested and marketed volumes of timber, likely due to private usage and a lack of an organized system for tracking and reporting volumes of timber. The forests are considered under used considering the annual allowable cut. The land use inefficiency is caused by the 1990s war: populations were displaced and abandoned their settlements in the mountains, and large areas of the lands are still contaminated by landmines, which may take at least 30 years to clean up.

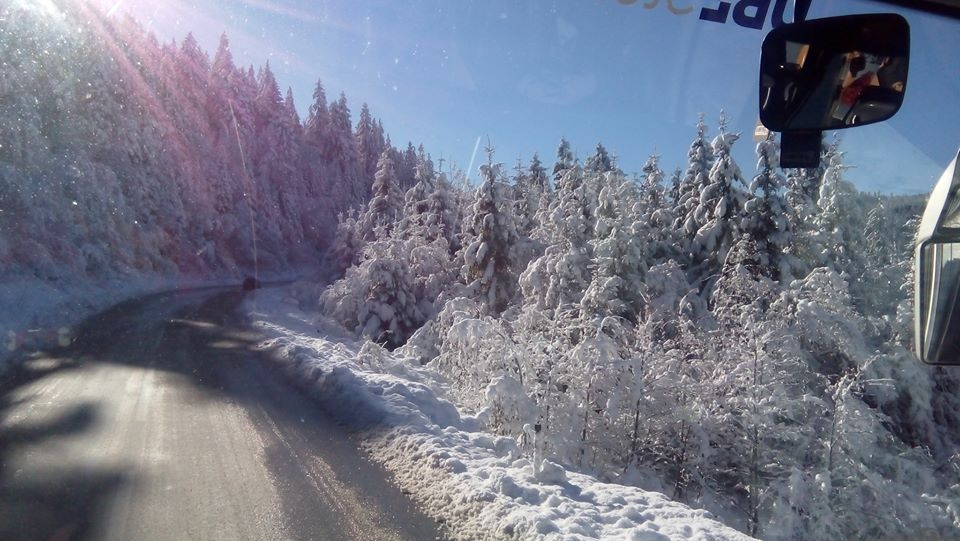
Snowy Jahorina in November

Bosnia and Herzegovina had a 2018 Forest Landscape Integrity Index mean score of 5.99/10, ranking it 89th globally out of 172 countries.

=== Mountains ===
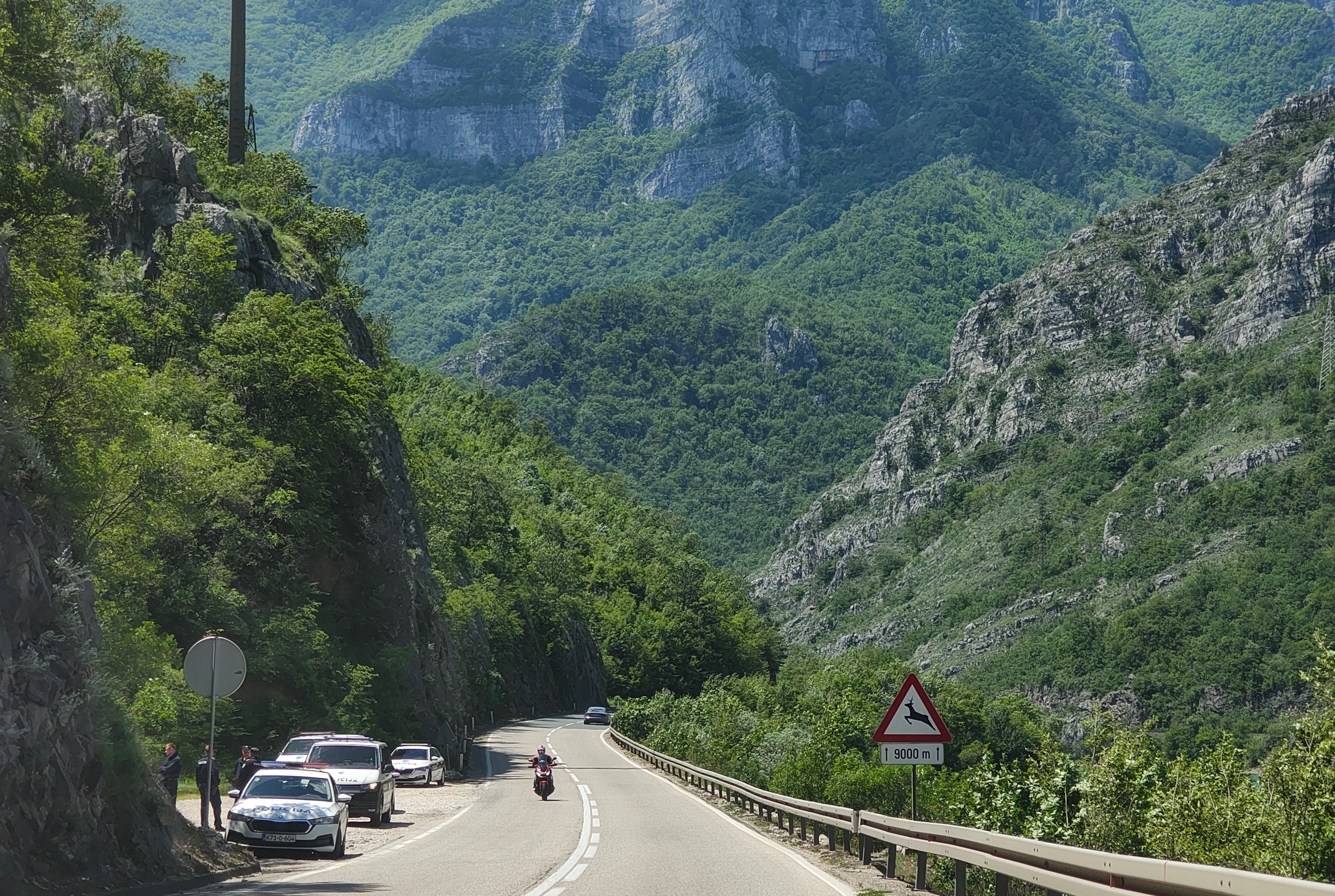
Abundant mountain scenery along Bosnian roads

Among all countries in Europe, Bosnia and Herzegovina has the tenth most mountain area shares, after countries like Switzerland, Armenia and Georgia. Trebević (1629 m, 5344 ft) is right above the capital city of Sarajevo. During the summer, it is significantly cooler than the city, while in the winter, it is cold and snowy. It is a popular destination for skiing. It houses multiple fresh-water springs which supply the city. Other springs feed the river Miljacka which flows through Sarajevo. The southern side of the mountain is exposed to strong winds from neighboring mountains Treskavica and Bjelasnica. Vegetative life is mostly present in lower areas of the mountains, which are more humid and fertile than the top. The mountain is covered with both wild and privately grown forests.

Jahorina (1913 m, 6275 ft) is a mountain range bordering Trebevic. It is also above Sarajevo. It has two main fresh-water springs, which supply areas around the city. The springs flow into the rivers Bosna and Drina. Jahorina is also a source of strong winds, and scarce usable land. Most of Jahorina is covered by thick forests, the highest ones reaching heights of 1700 m (5577 ft). Its vegetation is luxuriant. A plane called Saracevo Polje is especially wealthy due to its specific position and sun exposure. Blueberries, strawberries, many varieties of flowers as well as maple grow in this area. The mountain was named after the abundance of maple that grows here.

As far as biodiversity, the mountain Treskavica is one of the richest mountains in the country. This is likely due to the abundance of water sources. Several little springs are present as well as two smaller and three bigger natural lakes. The geological structure is the cause of such abundance of water. Trees such as beech, and red maple are abundant.

== Water ==
Water is the biggest opportunity for the economic expansion of Bosnia and Herzegovina. Higher levels of water increased the GDP by 0.3%, due to boosted electricity production and exports. The United Nations conducted a survey in 2013 and asked participants to identify the biggest priority for the improvement of the country and "Water, Energy Efficiency and Environmental Sustainability" was ranked priority number five out of fifteen. There are no existing water management facilities, which is a big disadvantage to the potential of water exploitation in the country, as well as maintaining the quality and quantity of water. Flood control facilities have not been updated or maintained since the war in the 1990s. Considering that the country is surrounded by rivers, and towns are situated right next to rivers such as Vrbas, Sava, Drina and Bosna, the damages caused by potential floods would be enormous. The only cleaning or disinfection methods used to clean the water is chlorine disinfection. Most of the municipalities and areas in the country have access to clean water. There are no reported areas that lack water. A sample group was interviewed in 2011, and the results of that survey showed that most people were satisfied with the quality and access to the water.

== Energy ==
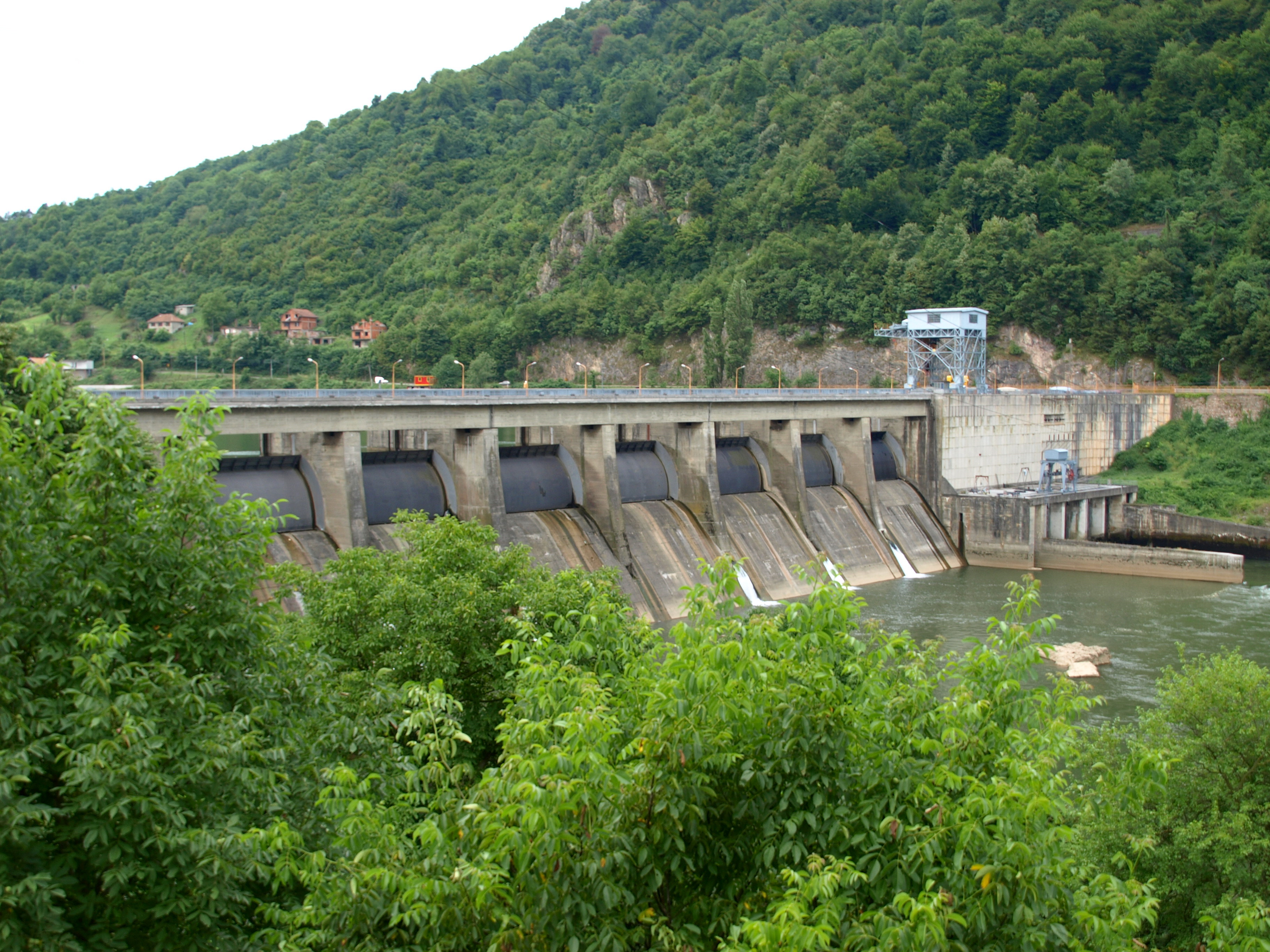
A hydroelectric dam on the Drina, which created Zvornik Lake.

The main sources of energy in Bosnia-Herzegovina are coal and hydro-power. Oil and natural gas are imported. In 2012, the approximated hydro-potential was 6,800 MW. Only 35% of that capacity has been used, making it the lowest rate of exploitation in Europe. The gas supply is unreliable because there is only natural gas one pipeline. Firewood is widely used for heating. Final energy consumption, which includes households, industry, traffic and agriculture, has been increasing since the drastic drops in the 1990s, caused by warfare. According to data from 2008, the final energy consumption in Bosnia-Herzegovina was 0.62 toe/capita, which is significantly less than the average of 1.10 toe/capita energy consumption of Western Balkan countries, and the average of 2.23 toe/capita of European Union countries. Renewable energy consumption was 575 ktoe, which was 9.59% of the total consumption in 2008. It is forecast that the conditions for hydroelectric power will improve, which will lead to decreased use of fossil fuels. High oil prices may discourage its widespread usage. Compared to the Western Balkan region, however, Bosnia and Herzegovina is the leader in the usage of renewable energy. In 2008, the only other country that reported a growth was Croatia, with a 0.6% growth of renewable energy usage, following Bosnia's 1.32%. All other countries, such as Albania, Macedonia and Serbia reported drops. Hydroelectric power is in majority with 51.8% of the renewable energy share, while biomass is at 48.14% and geothermal at 0.04%.

== Environmental criminal code ==
There is very little defined structure to environmental laws and offences in Bosnia and Herzegovina. The criminal codes pertaining to the environment are called "Criminal offences against the environment, agriculture and natural resources". Some laws and regulations that are not necessarily qualified or organized under the environmental category, do pertain to the environment. Examples of such laws are, "Illicit Procurement and Disposal of Nuclear Material", "Pollution of Potable Water and Foodstuff". In an analysis from 2012, the most common criminal offence against the environment was forestry theft. This pertains to cutting down trees for the purpose of selling and if the quantity was anywhere from 2 to five cubic meters. The prison sentence is determined by the volume of the trees cut down. This crime accounts for 96% of all environmental crimes prosecuted this year. This indicates that other environmental crimes are either not reported or properly prosecuted. Other laws pertain to mining, national parks, water usage, air protection, geological research, waste management, agriculture, agricultural land, energy protection and fresh water.

== Protected areas ==
Location	Local law preservation category	IUCN category
Area for resource management "University City"	Protected Area for Resource Management	IV
Bardača	Ramsar site - Wetland of International Importance	NA
Blidinje	Protected Landscape - Ramsar site	V
Đatlo Cave	Natural Monument	III
Hutovo Blato (Ramsar site)	Protected Landscape - Ramsar site	V
Janj Primeval Forest	Strict Nature Reserve	Ia
Kozara NP	National Monument	II
Ledana pit NM	National Monument	III
Livanjsko karst field	Ramsar site - Wetland of International Importance	NA
Ljubačevo cave NM	National Monument	III
Lom Primeval Forest	Strict Nature Reserve	Ia
Orlovača cave NM	National Monument	III
Pavlova cave	National Monument	III
Prokoško lake NM	National Monument	III
Protected Landscape Bijambare	Protected Landscape	V
Protected Landscape Konjuh	Protected Landscape	V
Protected Landscape Trebević	Protected Landscape	V
Ratuša cave NM	National Monument	III
Skakavac waterfall NM	National Monument	III
Sutjeska NP	National Park	II
Tajan Park NM	National Monument	III
Una NP	National Park	II
Vagan cave NM	National Monument	III
Vjetrenica cave	Protected Landscape	V
Vrelo Bosne NM - spring	National Monument	III
Žuta Bukva NM	National Monument	III

== Environmental issues ==
=== Air pollution ===
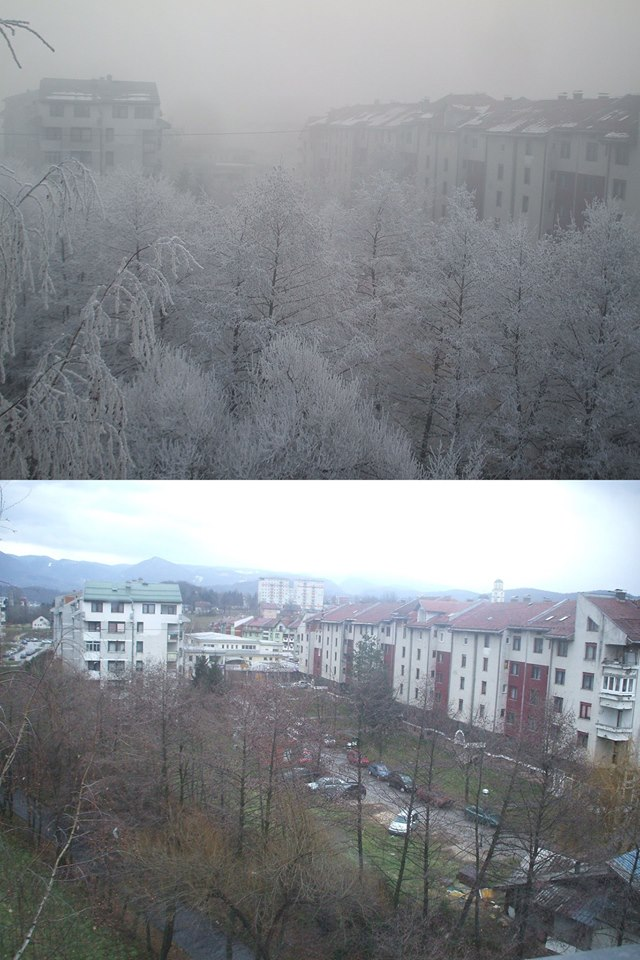
A day's difference in air pollution, Sarajevo

There are only six centres for air quality measurement in the entire country. The air pollution arises from traffic, and industrial activities. Air pollution significantly increases during the winter and in urban areas, due to very specific geographic positions and temperature changes. For example, since Sarajevo is located in a valley, gas-emissions become trapped in the area, with very little wind to clear it out. This causes heavy and thick smog that lingers for days. In December 2016, the pollution levels reached 50 ug/m^{3} and above, which is the cap for legally allowed air pollution. In Sarajevo, NO_{2} levels were above the legally allowed level, and levels higher than the WHO safe air level standards.

=== Lack of adequate administration ===
Bosnia and Herzegovina lacks well organized, and efficient administration that would handle its environmental issues quickly and properly. The country does not devote large amounts of resources towards building, sustaining, and developing its environment and economic potential through the environment. As of 2013, the country does not have a clear stance or strategy regarding climate change, nor has it put forward a mitigation commitment. It has identified 28 stationary installations for an emission trading system to be implemented in the future. In the area of nationwide efforts to reduce climate change and assure the sustainability of the country, significant efforts need to be made in the next few years.

=== Waste management and control ===
Waste is one of the biggest environmental issues in Bosnia and Herzegovina. Between 35% and 90% of the population is covered by some system of waste-collection. However, much of the equipment is outdated, and in poor condition. In a survey of 11 municipalities in the Drina river basin, the landfills being used did not comply with EU sanitation regulations. The landfills have also reached their capacity. This has led to illegal waste dumping, and in turn has caused many smaller landfills created by residents of the municipalities and located in rural, uninhibited areas close to the Drina. In this way, the eco-syststem of the Drina has been jeopardized. Annual packaging waste amounted to about 240.000 tones in 2010. Only about 5% of total waste is recycled. There are no functioning incinerators in the country. Due to a lack of an organized system for waste disposal, non-hazardous and hazardous waste ends up in the same landfills.

=== Climate change ===
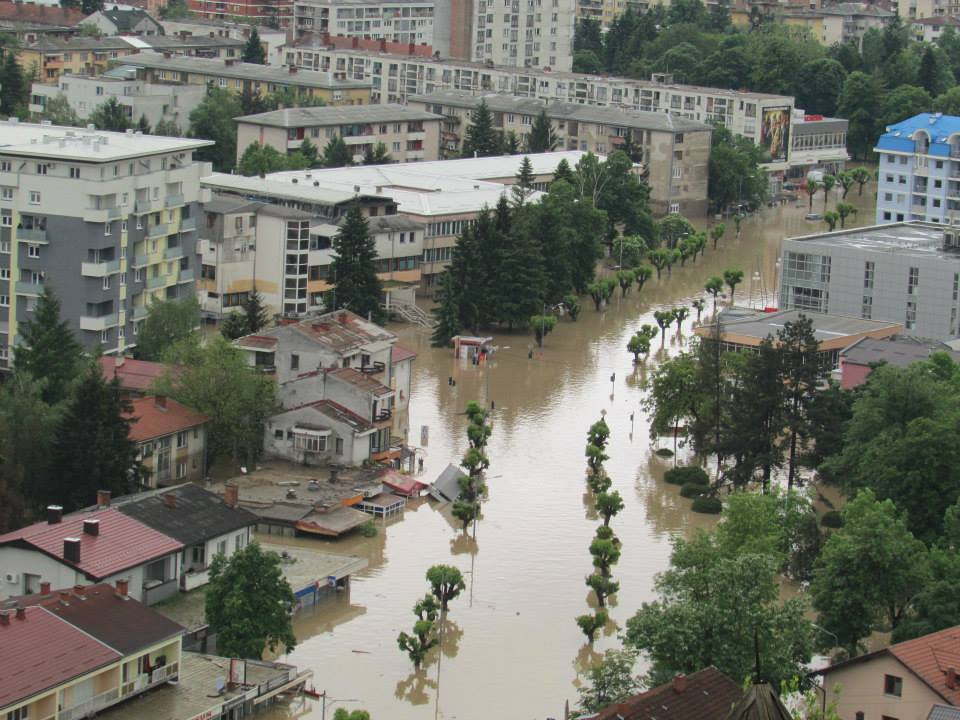
Floods in 2014 severely affected Bosnia and Herzegovina, as pictured in Doboj.

Bosnia and Herzegovina is considered vulnerable to climate change, with limited capacity to adapt. Between 1961 and 2016, the country's climate warmed and precipitation became more intense. The country has experienced extreme weather events, in particular a severe drought in 2012 and floods in 2014, which had severe economic consequences. Further consequences are expected as the global climate continues to warm. The agricultural sector, which forms a significant part of the economy and supports its majority rural population, is also being significantly affected. Tourism, energy production and consumption are also affected by climate change.

== Goals ==
The Regional Environmental Center in Bosnia and Herzegovina has identified the following goals for the betterment of everyday life in Bosnia and Herzegovina through environmental efforts:

=== Green transport ===
- Promoting cleaner alternatives to current vehicles of the public transport
- Appealing to offices of the capital city and other urban areas in the country

=== Water management ===
- Promoting better, more efficient water management systems
- Creating activities that raise the awareness
- Expanding capacities for water management
- Encouraging problem-solving and strategy-planning related to climate-change
- Include water management efforts as part of other sectors of the industry, such as agriculture, energy, fishing, regional politics and tourism

=== Climate change and clean energy ===
- Assess and plan the ability and plan to reduce greenhouse gas emissions
- Promote energy efficiency in the sector of energy production

=== Biodiversity ===
- Promoting joint efforts of care of the biodiversity and the usage of natural resources
- Research European strategies towards the preservation of biodiversity, and assess and potentially implement the same ones in Bosnia and Herzegovina

== See also ==
- Fauna of Bosnia and Herzegovina
