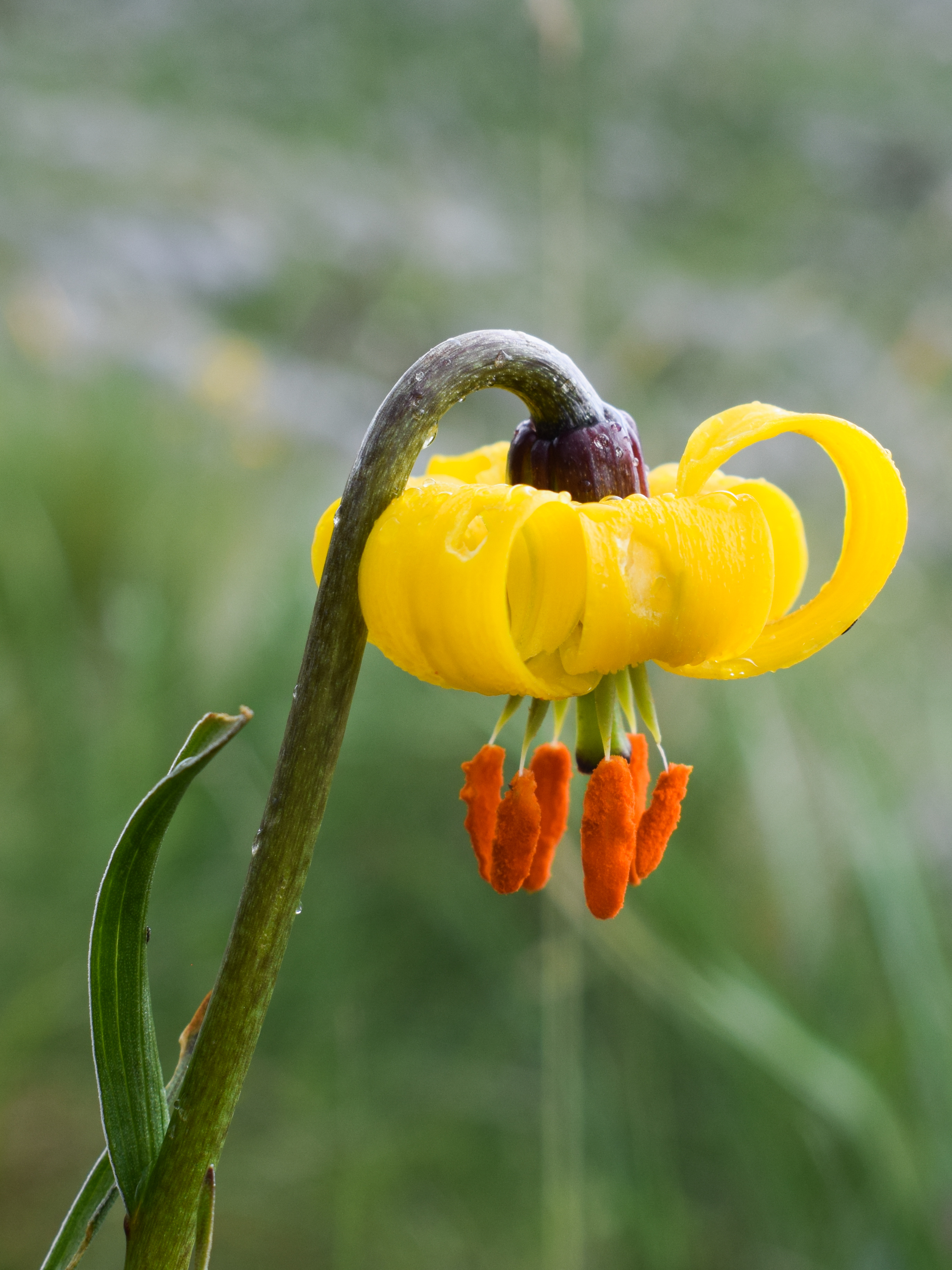
- Flower in the Jabllanica mountain range
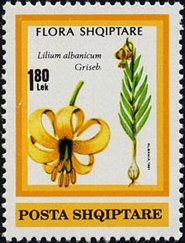
- On an Albanian postage stamp

Scientific classification
- Kingdom: Plantae
- Clade: Embryophytes
- Clade: Tracheophytes
- Clade: Angiosperms
- Clade: Monocots
- Order: Liliales
- Family: Liliaceae
- Subfamily: Lilioideae
- Genus: Lilium
- Species: L. albanicum

Binomial name
- Lilium albanicum Griseb.

Synonyms
- Lilium carniolicum subsp. albanicum (Griseb.) Hayek; Lilium chalcedonicum subsp. albanicum (Griseb.) K.Richt.; Lilium chalcedonicum var. albanicum (Griseb.) Asch. & Graebn.; Lilium pyrenaicum var. albanicum (Griseb.) V.A.Matthews

= Lilium albanicum =

Species of plant

Lilium albanicum, the Albanian lily, is a species of flowering plant in the family Liliaceae. It is native to Albania, North Macedonia, Serbia, southwestern Bulgaria and northern Greece. A perennial with yellow flowers, it appears to be a good species.

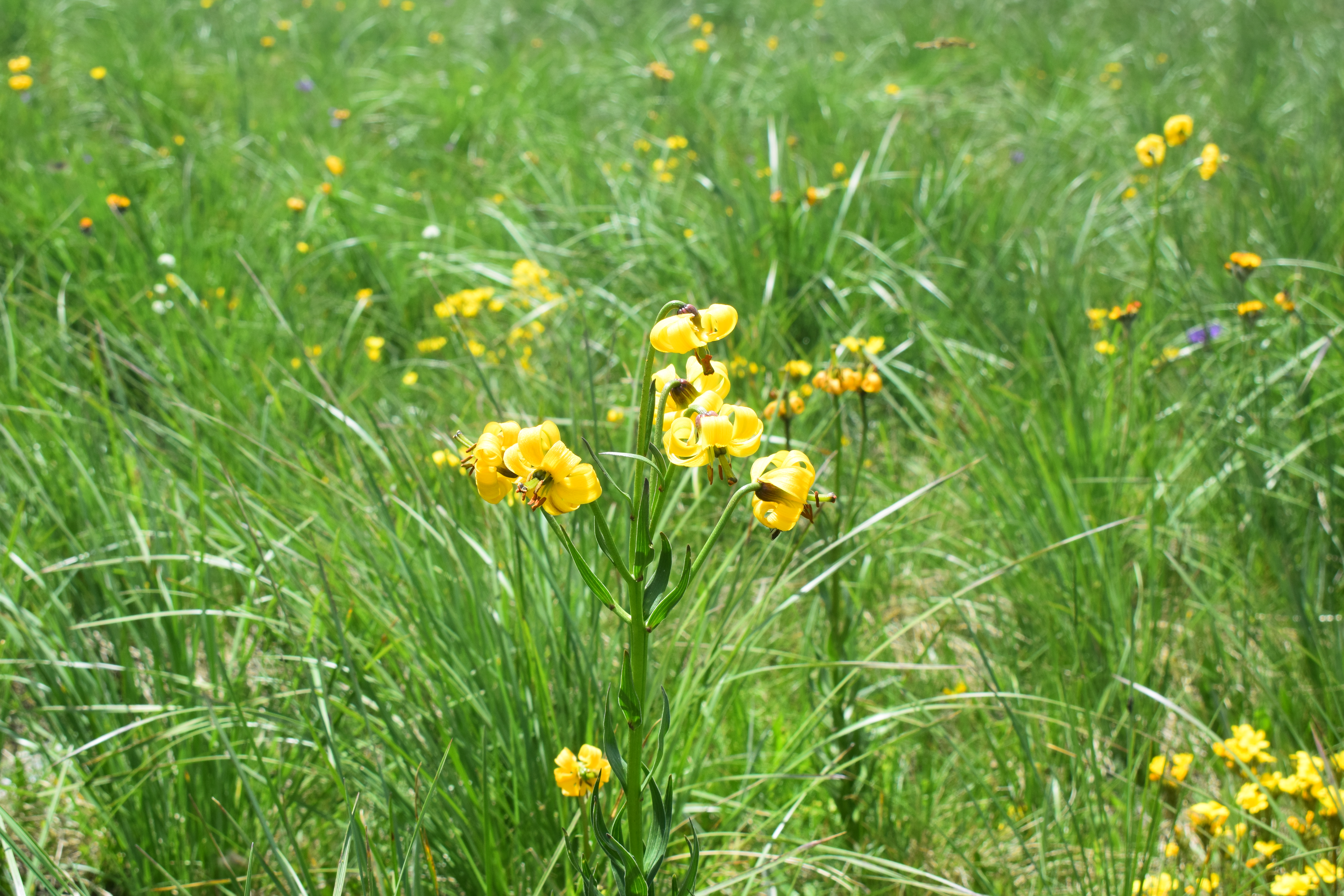
Habit
