= .ba =

Top-level Internet domain for Bosnia and Herzegovina

- Introduced: 14 August 1996
- TLD type: Country code top-level domain
- Status: Active
- Registry: University Tele-Information Center
- Sponsor: University Tele-Information Center
- Intended use: Entities connected with Bosnia and Herzegovina
- Actual use: Fairly popular in Bosnia-Herzegovina
- Registered domains: 33,032 (2025-12-09)
- Registration restrictions: Must be located in Bosnia-Herzegovina or have representative there
- Structure: Registrations are directly at second level, or at third level beneath some second-level labels
- Documents: Regulations
- DNSSEC: No
- Registry website: nic.ba

.ba is the Internet country code top-level domain (ccTLD) for Bosnia and Herzegovina. It is administered by the University Teleinformation Center.

== Registration ==
The procedure for registering domains within .ba is slightly more complicated than in other ccTLDs; the process is defined by laws and regulations of BiH institutions.

While international domains can be bought by anyone without any additional requests and documents, .BA domains can be registered by only entities that meet all requirements listed in the Regulations.

While domain registration is free, a local presence is needed. Any company that has a registered name or registered trademark in Bosnia–Herzegovina can register an eponymous .BA domain (provided that the domain is not already taken), though some additional caveats apply.

== Second-level domains ==
Privately owned second-level domains are permitted, which for-profit companies use. But there are also standardised second level domains:

Domain	Intended users
.edu.ba	Educational organisations
.gov.ba	Governmental authorities
.net.ba	Network operators
.org.ba	Non profit organisations
.mil.ba	Military entities and affiliated organisations

The rules for the standardised second level domains are fairly well enforced.
