= BH Telecom =

Bosnian telecommunications company

BH Telecom d.d. Sarajevo
- Type: Joint-stock company
- Traded as: SASE: BHTSR
- Industry: Telecommunications
- Founded: 5 April 1993; 33 years ago
- Headquarters: Sarajevo, Bosnia and Herzegovina
- Area served: Bosnia and Herzegovina
- Key people: Amel Kovačević (CEO)
- Products: Fixed telephony Mobile telephony Broadband Internet; IT Services
- Revenue: €284.16 million (2025)
- Net income: €33.67 million (2025)
- Total assets: €655.32 million (2025)
- Total equity: €529.47 million (2025)
- Owner: Federation of Bosnia and Herzegovina (90%)
- Number of employees: 2,958 (2025)
- Website: bhtelecom.ba

BH Telecom is a Bosnian telecommunications company, headquartered in Sarajevo, Bosnia and Herzegovina.

== History ==
Established in 1993 amidst the breakup of Yugoslavia, this company was the first in Bosnia and Herzegovina to provide GSM, 3G, IPTV, and other services. Initially, it operated as a government-owned entity, exclusively owned by the Federation of Bosnia and Herzegovina. In 2004, it became a publicly listed company, with the majority of its shares still held by the government. While stock owners hold both governance and ownership rights, the strategic distribution of capital results in the company effectively remaining under government direction and management.

== Company profile ==
The General Directorate of the company is located in Sarajevo, with seven regional directorates spanning the entirety of Bosnia and Herzegovina. These regional offices are located in Tuzla, Zenica, Mostar, Bihać, Travnik, Brčko and Goražde. The company also includes Telecom Inženjering, the tenth-largest organizational unit in Bosnia and Herzegovina, headquartered in Sarajevo.

At the end of 2003, BH Telecom Sarajevo had 454 installed switches (98 HOSTs and 356 Remote Units, with totally 648.527 installed connections), having 86.3% digitalization. Transmission system of the company had 100% digitalization.

In 2003, BH Telecom began with a major introduction of broadband technology. In April 2019, the company released LTE-A commercially in most major cities in the country.

In May 2013, BH Telecom started testing and implementing 4G technology.

In April 2022, the US Treasury added Bosnian MP Asim Sarajlić to the Specially Designated Nationals List under Executive Order 14033, noting in the reasoning that, among other things, "Sarajlic has also abused his position in relation to BH Telecom, a large BiH state-owned enterprise. In this capacity, Sarajlic personally accepted from payment from job applicants in exchange for positions, and otherwise exerted inordinate influence over the hiring process. As part of this activity, Sarajlic recommended candidates who were reportedly severely underqualified, undermining the integrity of the company."

== See also ==
- List of companies of Bosnia and Herzegovina
- List of mobile network operators in Europe
