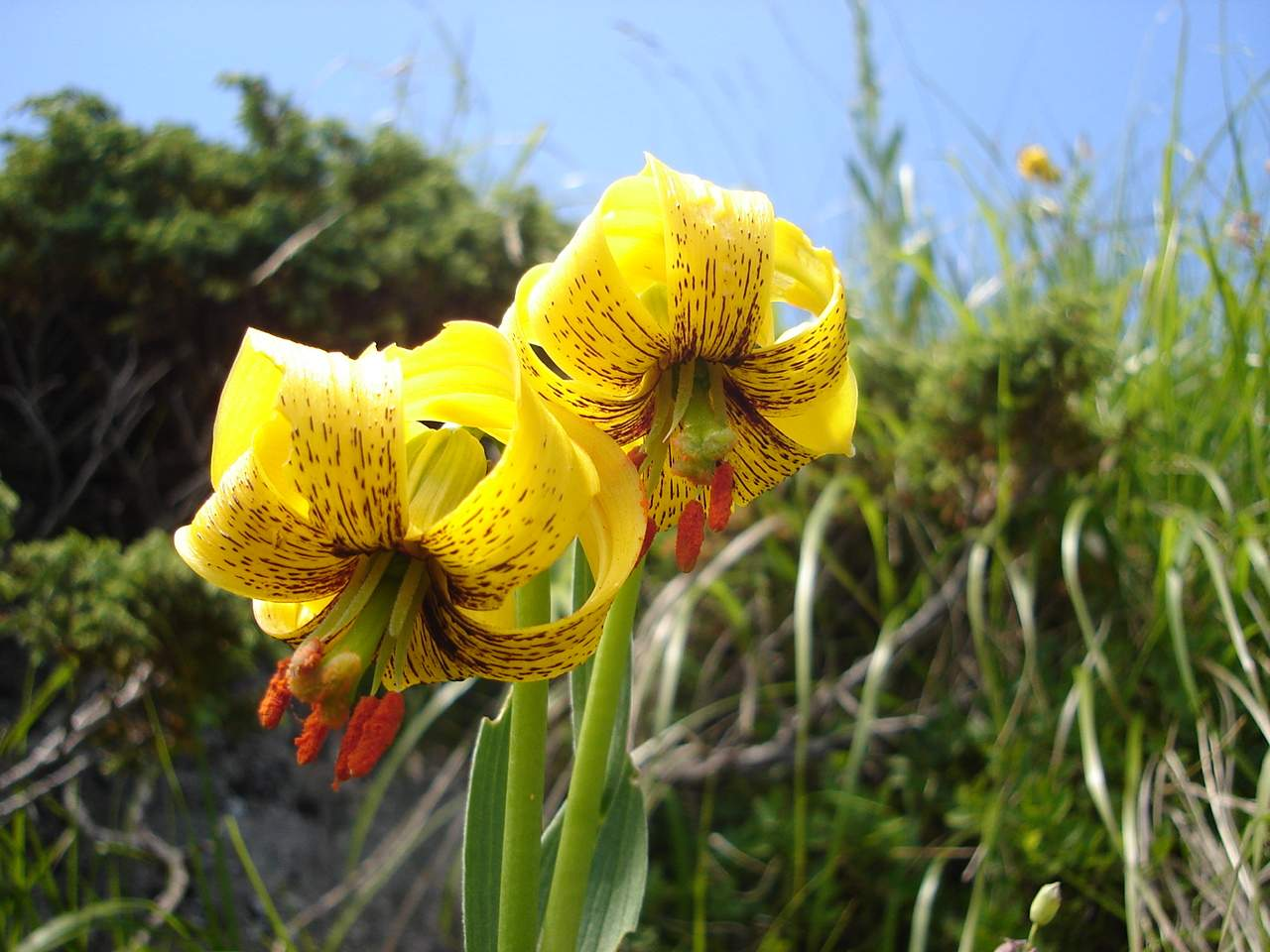

Scientific classification
- Kingdom: Plantae
- Clade: Tracheophytes
- Clade: Angiosperms
- Clade: Monocots
- Order: Liliales
- Family: Liliaceae
- Subfamily: Lilioideae
- Genus: Lilium
- Species: L. jankae

Binomial name
- Lilium jankae (L.) Hayek

= Lilium jankae =

Species of plant

Lilium jankae, also known as Janka's lily, is a flowering plant species in the family Liliaceae. The plant itself is native to multiple European countries such as Bulgaria, Greece, Italy, and Romania, but is mainly found in the Balkan Peninsula.

== Description ==
Little is known about this species; however, enough information has been collected for a moderate description. The stem grows slender, at about 40 to 80 cm tall, while the leaves (in numbers of 10 to 20) are narrow-lanceololate. The tepals, arguably the most eye-catching part of Lilium jankae, are bright golden-yellow or orange, with reddish/slightly brown speckles along the ends. This is seen commonly in Liliaceae species, and the tepals are strongly reflexive (bending backward). The bulb of the plant is about 3-4 cm in diameter, and buried deep (10-15 cm) in soil (specifically, calcareous or dolomitic).

The smell of Lilium jankae has been described as a "pungent fragrance", smelling similarly to a "worn tennis shoe" and "rotting cabbage".

== Distribution and habitat ==
Lilium jankae have been reported to favor temperate, subalpine regions, thriving in meadows, limestone ridges, forest margins, and grassy slopes (in specific, about 400-1,500 m). The plant can tolerate the summer heat of its environment, but for proper development, it requires cool spring moisture. Additionally, the plant enjoys lime-rich soils with high mineral content.

L. jankae was distributed across Southeastern Europe and found in many different areas, but its current main location is the Balkan Peninsula.

== Uses ==
Unlike its other species in its genus, Lilium jankae has no recorded benefits or uses.

== Toxicity ==
The species poses an extremely potent toxicity risk in pets, specifically cats, similar to its fellow species in its family . Although this risk runs high in cats, Lilium jankae shows little to no severe discomfort or debilitating side effects in humans.
