= HT Eronet =

Telecommunications company in Bosnia and Herzegovina

JP HT d.d. Mostar
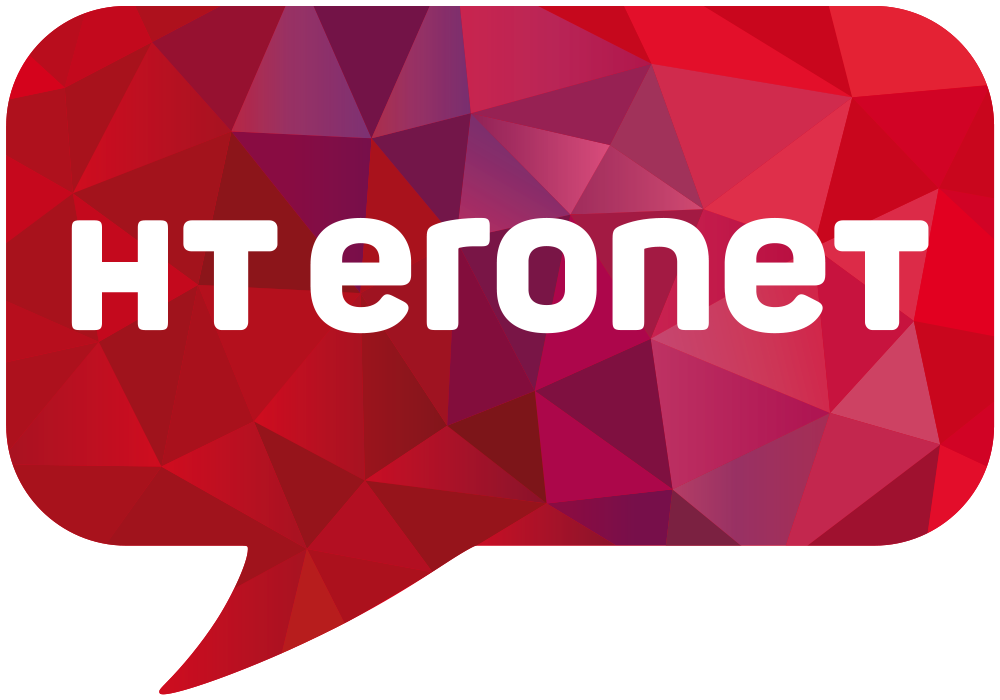
- Current logo since 2019
- Type: Joint-stock company
- Traded as: SASE: HTKMR
- Industry: Telecommunications
- Founded: 1 January 2003; 23 years ago
- Headquarters: Kneza Branimira bb, 88000 Mostar, Bosnia and Herzegovina
- Key people: Goran Kraljević (General director)
- Products: Mobile telephony Fixed telephony Broadband internet IPTV; IT and network services
- Revenue: €108.4 milion (2024)
- Owner: Federation of Bosnia and Herzegovina (50%); Hrvatski Telekom (39%)
- Number of employees: 1,345 (2022)
- Subsidiaries: haloo d.o.o. (MVNO)
- Website: hteronet.ba

JP Hrvatske telekomunikacije d.d. Mostar, doing business as HT Eronet, is a telecommunications company in Bosnia and Herzegovina. The company was created on after separating Hrvatska pošta Mostar (HP Mostar) and Hrvatske telekomunikacije (HT).

== History ==
Former logo (2003-2019)

HT Mostar was founded on 1 January 2003. Based on Company reorganization on 24 November 2006, HT Mobilne d.o.o. merged with HT Mostar thus becoming an integral part of the public company HT d.o.o. Mostar. On 1 April 2009, the Assembly of the Company passed a decision on the re-registration of the Company from a limited liability company to a joint stock company. The re-registration was made on 8 June 2009, and the shares of the Company were listed on the Sarajevo Stock Exchange.

The three main TLC operators in Bosnia and Herzegovina have strong links to political parties. In 2003, an OHR-mandated audit revealed that BH Telecom, RS Telekom and HT Mostar suffered substantial misuse of funds, corruption and mismanagement, with a total loss of USD 57 million in 2002. Pressure for reform was raised by the public revelation of high salaries and financial support to political parties.

In 2010, a U.S. cable defined Eronet and HT Mostar as HDZ BiH's "traditional cash cow", noting how "As Federation Minister of Finance in 1999, Čović helped arrange the transfer of Eronet to three private companies owned by HDZ BiH interests. Stipe Prlić, as HT Mostar's General Manager, challenged the privatization in court and won, arguing that the Federation government had not authorized it. Čović has fought Prlic's reappointment ever since."

== Owner structure ==
HT Eronet owners are: Government of the Federation of Bosnia and Herzegovina (FBiH) (50.10%), Hrvatski Telekom (HT) (39.10%), Hrvatska pošta (HP) (5.23%) and small shareholders (5.57%).

== See also ==
- List of mobile network operators in Europe
