= Mass media in Bosnia and Herzegovina =

Avaz Twist Tower, the headquarters of Dnevni avaz

The mass media of Bosnia and Herzegovina refers to mass media outlets based in Bosnia and Herzegovina (BiH). Television, radio, magazines and newspapers are all operated by both state-owned and for-profit corporations which depend on advertising, subscription, and other sales-related revenues. The Constitution of Bosnia and Herzegovina guarantees freedom of speech, although political and business pressures - coupled with administrative fragmentation - still hinder the independence of journalists and media outlets.

As a country in transition with a post-war legacy and a complex domestic political structure, Bosnia and Herzegovina's media system is under transformation. In the early postwar period (1995–2005), media development was guided mainly by international donors and cooperation agencies, who invested to help reconstruct, diversify, democratize and professionalize media outlets.

Post-war developments included the establishment of an independent Communication Regulatory Agency, the adoption of a Press Code, the establishment of the Press Council, the decriminalization of libel and defamation, the introduction of a rather advanced Freedom of Access to Information Law, and the creation of a Public Service Broadcasting System from the formerly state-owned broadcaster. Yet, internationally backed positive developments have been often obstructed by domestic elites, and the professionalisation of media and journalists has proceeded only slowly. High levels of partisanship and linkages between the media and the political systems hinder the adherence to professional code of conducts.

== History ==
During the war in Bosnia and Herzegovina, most media became propaganda tools of the authorities, armies, and factions - with the exception of Sarajevo's Oslobodjenje. Since then, efforts have been made - with limited success - to develop media which bridge ethnic boundaries.

== Legislative framework ==
Freedom of expression and freedom of the media in Bosnia and Herzegovina are guaranteed by the Constitution, the European Convention on Human Rights and other international human rights conventions that are directly integrated in Bosnia and Herzegovina's constitutional order. Freedom of expression and media freedom is guaranteed by the entity constitutions too.

Other relevant laws are the Law on Protection from Defamation, which regulates libel and defamation, and the Law on Communications. Due to the failure of authorities in both Republika Srpska and the Federation of Bosnia and Herzegovina to ensure the creation of the necessary legal framework that would enable journalists to work professionally and independently in their environment, in 1999 the High Representative passed the Decision on Freedom of Information and the abolition of criminal penalties for insult and defamation. Defamation was decriminalised in Bosnia and Herzegovina in 2002.

Law on Communications is the general legal framework for the broadcasting and telecommunications industry, which establishes the Communications Regulatory Agency (CRA) as the independent state agency that regulates broadcasting and telecommunication sectors.

The law provides for freedom of speech and press; however, the government does not always respect press freedom in practice. The Federation of Bosnia and Herzegovina law prohibits hate speech. The Republika Srpska law does not specifically proscribe hate speech, although the law prohibits causing ethnic, racial, or religious hatred. Independent analysts note a continuing tendency of politicians and other leaders to label unwanted criticism as hate speech. The law prohibits arbitrary interference with privacy, family, home, or correspondence, and the government generally respects these prohibitions in practice.

The Communications Law also regulates media concentration and ownership issues. The CRA has adopted a Rule on Media Concentration and Cross-ownership, as referred by the Communications Law, to prevent cross-ownership concentration. The Competition Law provides further rules on market concentration.

The BiH law on Freedom of Access to Information is rather advanced and grants public access to all information held by public institutions, with exceptions only to protect information with a particularly negative effect on defence, public security, monetary policy, or privacy of third-parties. In practice, though, the process can be cumbersome and discourage journalists from requesting official information.

The Law on the Public Broadcasting Service System of Bosnia and Herzegovina regulates the overall functioning of the system and the relations between its components, and is complemented by other state- and entity-level laws: the Law on Public Broadcasting Service of Bosnia and Herzegovina - BHRT, the Law on the Radio Television of Federation of BiH – RTVFBiH and the Law on the Radio Television of Republika Srpska – RTRS

The Broadcasting Code of Conduct of the Communications Regulatory Agency provides standards for programming, requiring radio and TV stations to “demonstrate impartiality in their reporting, professionalism and equal representation of all social groups and different positions and opinions, with no discrimination on any grounds.“ The laws regulating public broadcasters foresee similar standards.

The CRA has also adopted a Code on Audio-Visual and Radio Media Services, by which to measure the application of the licence terms, and an Advertising and Sponsorship Code, that regulate the protection of minors in the context of advertising and sponsorship. Despite these codes, there are still concerns about the proper following of professional standards.

The BiH Electoral Commission has adopted in 2005 the Rules on Media Presentation of Political Subjects in the Election Period, as required by BiH Electoral Law. These rules set the standards for the coverage of electoral campaigns and require broadcasters to provide factual, complete, honest, fair and impartial information, and to treat political competitors equally and impartially.

There is no registrar of on-line media in Bosnia Herzegovina and they do not require an operating licence. In the last years, the Press Council in BIH has committed itself to drafting a regulation in this area that would be based on the principle of self-regulation. In 2013, the Ministry of Communication started to draft a New Media Law, including the regulation of the internet and online media. This initiative raised some concerns, as it was expected to include limitations such as permits and licences

=== Status of journalists ===
Professionalism and quality journalism are rare in Bosnia and Herzegovina. Journalists receive relatively lower salaries, despite holding higher degrees, and these are often not paid regularly due to financial difficulties of media outlets. Work overload and time pressure pushes journalists to present unsupported evidence or use unreliable sources. Online media also often fail to respect copyright standards. Many journalists work without proper work contracts, often hired to work regular working hours, or even longer, without having their health care and pension funds covered.

=== Regulatory authorities ===
The Communications Regulatory Agency (CRA) is charged with regulating the country's radio and television media, as established by the Law on Communications. The CRA is an independent agency, tasked with the regulation of radio and TV broadcasting and telecommunications networks; licensing; radio frequency spectrum allocation, and developing and enforcing rules and regulations within the communications market. The Law on Communications guarantees its independence and prevents Council of Ministers, individual ministers, or any other person to influence its decisions. Moreover, state officials on all levels of government, members of political party bodies, and those linked to telecommunications operators or electronic media, are barred from being appointed as CRA Director General. The CRA has executive powers to enforce regulations, and is financially independent. Its decisions are generally seen as fair.

The CRA Director-General is appointed by the CRA Council and approved by the Council of Ministers of BiH. Due to political dispute, the agency has been without a director for the last seven years. A draft bill put forward by the BiH government in 2014, which would reduce the authority of the CRA, has given rise to concerns.

=== Self-regulatory bodies ===
Editorial policy and contents of BiH media are not regulated. Self-regulation on ethical and professional principles is provided by the Press Code.

The Press Council of BiH has been established as an independent, non-governmental, non-political self-regulatory body, comprising all journalists' associations and responsible for self-regulation of online and print media content. It aims to solve disputes among media and readers through professional tools such as the right to response, correction, apology and rebuttal, but it cannot impose sanctions in terms of fines, suspensions, or closure. Its mediation often leads to a retraction or a response. In 2012 the Press Council considered 176 complaints alleging inaccurate or libelous reporting by print and online media (103 for print and 73 for online media), accepting 35 as valid and rejecting 19 as unfounded.

== Media outlets ==
In 2014 Bosnia and Herzegovina had eight daily newspapers (mostly private), 189 weekly or monthly newspapers and magazines, 142 radio stations, 43 television stations, and eight news agencies. Yet, many citizens cannot afford access to multiple sources.

Bosnian-Herzegovinian outlets are often partisan and affiliated to different ethnic and political groups. The economic recession has worsened their dependence on political and commercial interests, fostering self-censorship. The government of Republika Srpska keeps directly subsidizing pro-governmental outlets, while many local media receive funds from local authorities. Community media are legally barred from receiving advertising revenues, thus stifling their development. Ownership structure of media outlets is often obscure.

=== Print media ===
The Press Council of BiH recorded there are eight daily newspapers (all privately owned), 100 different types of magazines, 71 specialized magazines, and eight religious magazines. Several Serbian and Croatian press media are also sold in Bosnia and Herzegovina. Data on newspapers' circulation are not published by media outlets, and are deemed a business secret. Market research agencies in 2006 reported as the mostly read dailies Dnevni avaz (36%), Blic (10%), then Glas Srpske, Večernje novosti and Večernji list (4% each). One third of the population does not read newspapers. Advertisement revenues shares in 2007 were divided as follows: Dnevni avaz (34%), Dnevni list (24%), Oslobođenje (16,75%), Nezavisne novine (12,72%), Glas Srpske (8,92%), Večernji list (3,48%)

Reading patterns mainly follow territorial and ethno-national lines. Dnevni avaz, published in Sarajevo, targets mainly a Bosniak readership; Nezavisne novine, from Banja Luka, is read by Bosnian Serbs; Večernji list and Jutarnji list are aimed at the Bosnian Croats.

Magazines have followed a trend of commercialization, with the lead being taken by women's magazines such as Azra (14.7% of readership in 2005) and Gloria (12.5%), overcoming political magazines such as Dani (9.4%), Slobodna Bosna (7.2%) and Express (5.3%).

=== Radio broadcasting ===
- Radio stations: 3 large public radio broadcasters and many private radio stations (2010).

Bosnia and Herzegovina's Public Service Broadcasting System (BHRT) includes four radio channels: BH Radio 1 at state level, plus at entity level Federalni Radio in the Federation of BiH (part of RTVFBiH) and Radio Republike Srpske in the Republika Srpska (part of RTRS).

The radio market sees 144 radio stations active, of which 65 are public and 79 are private (2009 data). Their revenues come mostly from advertising (60%), coupled with public subsidies and program sales. The market is highly fragmented, with 60% of the revenues shared between 130 stations, and the remaining 40% among the 10 main stations. No single radio outlets makes more than 15% of the market revenues. Two thirds of the revenues go to public broadcasters, either the national Public Service (30%) or other local state-owned outlets (34%); private broadcasters only tap the 36%. Radios are often vertically integrated in media groups that also control TV stations, cable operators, internet providers, and even marketing agencies. Other radios are owned by municipal or cantonal governments, and publicly funded

Most listeners (48% in 2006) syntonize themselves primarily on local radio stations, of whom BN Radio (15%) has the best rating, followed by BH Radio 1 (13%) and Radio Big 1 (10%). Some 22% respondents report never to listen to the radio.

=== Television broadcasting ===
Radio and Television of Bosnia and Herzegovina (BHRT) building in Sarajevo.

TV is the chief news source. The most influential broadcasters are the public radio and TV stations operated by the Bosniak-Croat and Serb entities, the RTVFBiH and RTRS, which are under effective control of ruling national parties in each one. A state-level broadcaster, BHRT, completes the field

The Office of the High Representative (OHR), the leading international civilian agency in Bosnia, oversaw the development of national public broadcasting and worked to create a non-nationalist, civic media.

The Radio and Television of Bosnia and Herzegovina (BHRT), formerly known as RTVBiH (1992–1998) and then PBSBiH, is an umbrella broadcasting organization and the only member of the European Broadcasting Union from Bosnia and Herzegovina. In 1992 RTVBiH grew out of RTV Sarajevo, one of eight principal broadcasting centers of former Yugoslavia and on 1 January 1993, RTVBiH was admitted as an active member of the European Broadcasting Union. It includes the National public television channel BHT 1, the National public radio service BH Radio 1, and the Music Production unit MP BHRT. A common public corporation of BHRT with the entity-level public broadcasters RTVFBiH and RTRS is in the process of being established.

Sarajevo is home to some TV-stations such as Al Jazeera Balkans, an offshoot of the Qatar-based pan-Arab news network, broadcasting in Bosnian, Croatian, and Serbian. or its competitor N1, a 24-hour cable news channel.

- Television stations: 3 public TV broadcasters: Radio and Television of Bosnia and Herzegovina (BHRT), Federation TV operating 2 networks, and Radio Televizija Republike Srpske; a local commercial network of 5 TV stations; 3 private, near-national TV stations; and dozens of small independent TV stations (2010).

=== Cinema ===
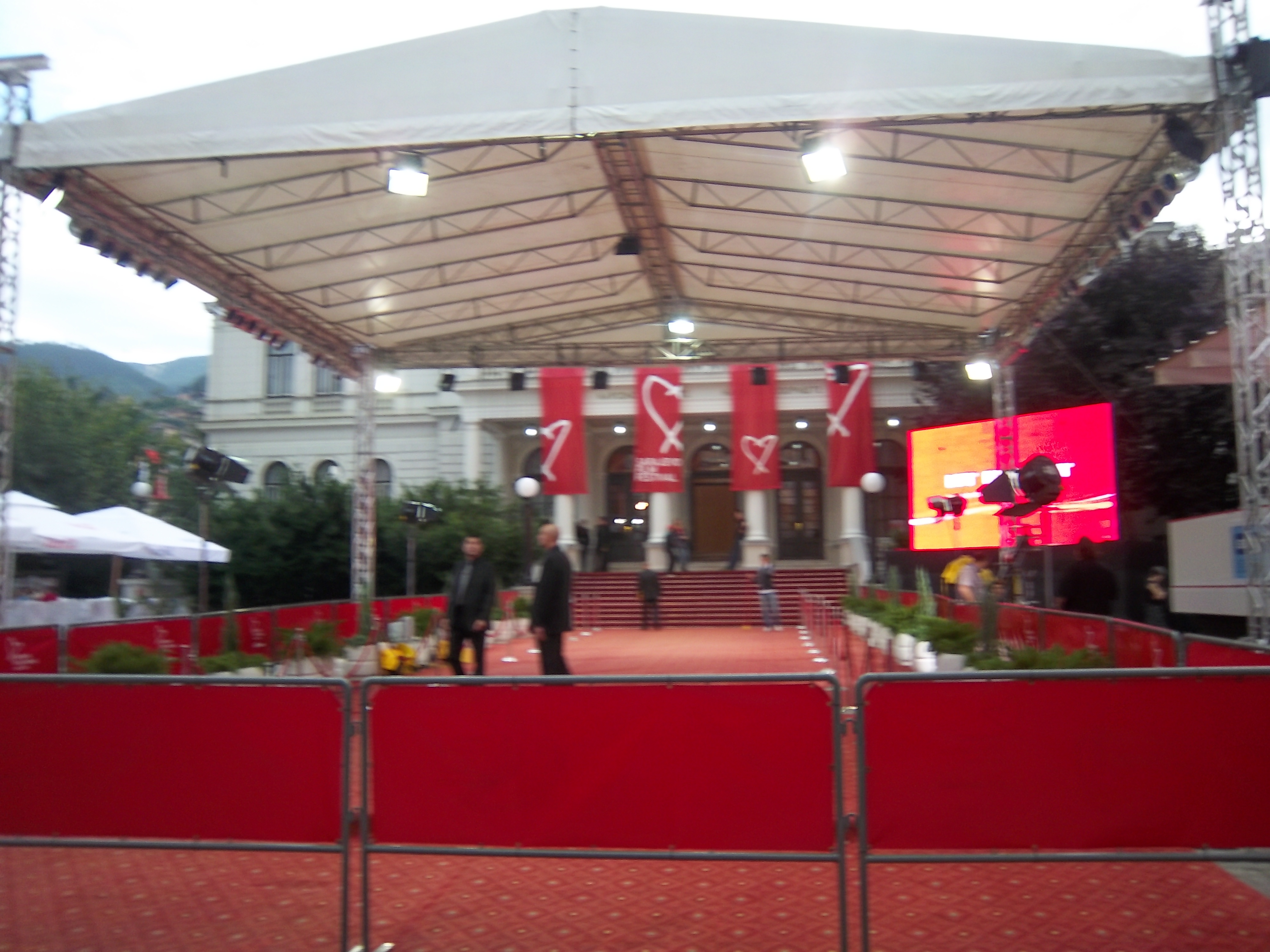
SFF red carpet

The history of cinema in Bosnia and Herzegovina started with the first film screening on July 27, 1897. Yet, the development of the film industry only happened after the second world war. 120 feature films and hundreds of documentaries and short films were produced in the country until today, of which around 20 in the last decade (mostly co-productions).

In 2008 Bosnia and Herzegovina hosted 50 cinema theatres with 7.409 film screenings, of which 503 of locally produced or co-produced films. The number of cinema-goers was on a negative trend, from 643.009 in 2003 to 236.517 in 2008

The film industry suffered heavily of the war and post-war destruction of the country. The BiH Fund for Cinematography was established only in 2002 by the entity-level FBiH Ministry of Culture, and is today the only one to finance film productions in BiH and supporting the Association of Film Workers of Bosnia and Herzegovina. The annual Sarajevo Film Festival (SFF), established in 1995, is the flagship event in the region and an important way to promote BiH's film industry, also through co-productions promoted by the CineLink project.

=== Telecommunications ===
The Telecommunications sector in Bosnia and Herzegovina is undergoing liberalisation. Up to 2006, there were three licensed fixed telecommunication operators: BH Telecom, based in Sarajevo, covering 51% of the population of BiH and most of the territory of the Federation of BiH; Telekom Srpske, based in Banja Luka, covering 34% of the population of BiH, mainly in the territory of Republika Srpska; and HT Eronet, based in Mostar, covering 16% of the population of BiH, mainly in the Federation of BiH. The three companies enjoyed a de facto monopoly over their operating areas, although they have nationwide licenses for domestic and international calls. New players have entered the marked since the start of its liberalisation in 2007. The numbers of fixed telephony service subscribers were of 849.027 in 2001 and of 1.022.475 in 2007. Fixed telephony penetration rates increased from 22,35% (2001) to 26,41% (2007).

The mobile telephony sector is highly competitive, as the three main telephone operators compete nationwide with the brands BH Mobile, M-Tel and HT Eronet. Mobile networks cover 99% of the population and have a 63.29% penetration rate, with 2.450.425 subscribers in 2007, doubling from 2004.

The TLC operators are still mainly state-owned and there is strong resistance to privatisation, with 90% of BH Telecom and 50.1% of HT Eronet owned by the Federation of BiH. In Republika Srpska, Telekom Srpske was privatised and is now mainly (65%) owned by Telekom Srbija.

The telecommunications market is regulated by the Communications Regulatory Agency, which also regulates broadcasting and Internet sectors.

=== Internet ===
Internet users in Bosnia and Herzegovina have rapidly increased, from 585.000 in 2004 up to 1.055.000 in 2007. Internet penetration rose from 2% in 2002 to 35% in 2009 and 61% in 2014. The youth (15-24) is the most web-connected population share.

Media outlets opened websites in the 2000s, but their online operations remained a reflex of print versions. The first ones to invest in online news were Dnevni avaz, followed by Radio Sarajevo and Oslobođenje. Yet, the country most visited portal was Sarajevo-x.com, an independent website which later developed in the Klix.ba portal.

There are no government restrictions on access to the Internet or reports that the government monitors e-mail or Internet chat rooms.

== Media organisations ==
=== News agencies ===
There were 9 active news agencies in Bosnia and Herzegovina in 2014, of which two are publicly owned: FBiH's Federal News Agency (FENA) and RS' News Agency of Republika Srpska (SRNA). The main private agency is ONASA. Two other agencies are owned by religious groups: the Roman Catholic Conference of Bishops of BiH and by the Islamic Community of Bosnia and Herzegovina. The Anadolu Agency, is property of the Turkish Government. The last one, the Eastern Adriatic News Service is the only regional news agency in private ownership.

=== Trade unions ===
Bosnia and Herzegovina hosts six journalist associations, often along ethno-national lines. One of the few active ones is BH novinari (BiH Journalists). Broadcasters are represented by the Association of Independent Electronic Media and the Association of Private Radio and Television Stations in B&H, gathered in the Association of Media Industry (UMI) to include also advertising agencies and tasked with producing data on TV ratings. The Association of Graphic, Publishing, and Media Employees in BiH represent the print media and printing houses.

=== Production companies ===
Independent production companies proliferated after 1995. At least 30 of them are active today, producing TV programs, documentaries, short films and feature films. The main ones include Refresh, Pro.ba, Flash Production, F.I.S.T. Production, and Deblokada.

== Censorship, self-censorship and media freedom ==
In Bosnia and Herzegovina professional journalism is under appreciated by the public and underpaid. Low salaries, irregular pay for journalists and an increasing number of threats to journalist - recorded by the 2017 Media Sustainability Index by IREX, allow for political pressure and self-censorship. Self-censorship also happen because journalists are reluctant to cover stories that can cause them problems.

According to Transparency International Bosnia and Herzegovina, journalists working on corruption are “exposed to attacks and pressures, even by the representatives of Bosnia and Herzegovina authorities, which lead to the emergence of self-censorship within the media themselves”. Self-censorship is enhanced by the rare, but continuing, physical attacks and threats against journalists. As these cases are often not followed by proper investigation, journalists feel unprotected and so they may not be willing to cover certain topics, hindering reporting on issues of public relevance.

Experiences of journalists working in the newsrooms in Bosnia and Herzegovina gathered by the Media Centar Sarajevo, suggest that editorial policies are often influenced by political and economic elites. This creates an atmosphere where is clear which are what are the preferred topics and figures and what are those journalists should not write about.

Nineteen journalists have been killed in Bosnia and Herzegovina since 1992, increasing the likelihood of self-censorship within the media. There were at least 20 documented cases of threats and intimidation of media workers in 2015 alone, and in 2014 authorities raided the offices of the most popular Internet news website. Vague language in social media legislation in the Srpska region criminalises “attempts to disturb the public peace”.

Bosnia and Herzegovina has no official system of recording crimes against journalists, which end up mostly being classified as minor offenses. The professional status of the victim is not taken into account by the authorities. According to RS general prosecutor Mahmut Švraka, journalists "overreact to threats and make unsubstantiated claims", only to then lose interest in the cases since the procedure is very lengthy.

=== Attacks and threats against journalists ===
The Association of BiH Journalists recorded 20 cases of attacks or threats to journalists in the first 7 months of 2014, including five physical attacks and one death threat. Twenty cases were also recorded in 2013, and 22 in 2012. Human Rights Watch recorded a "decidedly mixed record" concerning the state response to the attacks, and "a climate of fear among journalists" since, as reporter Amer Bahtijar summarized, "it would only mean that the police have to investigate themselves".

- A private security guard of the East Sarajevo hospital threatened to shoot Slobodan Vasković, reporter on corruption and war crimes, the same day he was in court to defend himself in a defamation case launched against him by Republika Srpska's president Milorad Dodik, in September 2013. The police failed to investigate the case.
- A Mostar-based journalist was physically attacked in July 2012 by a woman in her hometown of Ljubuski after the screening of a documentary about her late husband Nedeljko Galić, with whom she saved Bosniaks from deportations to concentration camps during the conflict. She had previously reported online threats to the police, who did not take her seriously. After the attack, she had to move out of Ljubuski with her family. The police qualified the event only as "disturbing public order". After international pressures, the attacker was tried and received in first instance a rather lenient three-month suspended sentence for assault.
- In October 2011 the members of BHRT TV crew were verbally and physically attacked by two security guards outside the Milići mine, a suspect Bosniak mass grave, that was to be privatized. The Milići police waited for calls from their command in Bijeljina before allowing them to file a report on the event. The two men were indicted by the Vlasenica prosecutor, but the case did not go through.
- Several cases of physical attacks or threats against journalists were recorded in 2014. A former war crimes reporter suffered head injuries after an attack in January. In June a Federalna TV camera operator was threatened with a knife while covering the return to Mostar of convicted war criminal Dario Kordic. The columnist Slavo Kukic was also attacked with a baseball bat, after he had criticised Kordic's welcome party. Two death threats and five physical assaults were recorded by the Free Media Helpline programme of the BiH Journalists' Association in January/November 2014.
- Cases of excessive use of force by police against journalists were reported during the 2014 protests in Tuzla, where two journalists were beaten, handcuffed and cursed by police officers, after having their cameras broken and receiving death threats. A journalist from RTV Slon was hit in the head with a baton while wearing a press badge. Federation police reportedly started an investigation on the case, but with no development to date.

=== Political interferences ===
Twenty-eight Bosnian journalists interviewed by HRW described political interference as commonplace in the work. In August 2013 the Banja Luka-based Istinito news website reported of students posters against RS' president Milorad Dodik. The police threatened the website owner with arrest and requested him to surrender the IP addresses of the sources of the story.A BH Dani journalist denounced several attempts by Sadik Ahmetovic, vicepresident of the SDA party in Srebrenica, to prevent the publication of her articles before the 2014 administrative elections, up to threatening her with deportation to her home country Poland. Dani withstood the pressures up until a change in editors in August 2014, after which the journalist left the newspaper.

Surprise financial and administrative inspections are used as a method to punish media outlets after critical reporting. This was the case of the joint raid on 29 December 2014 by RS and FBiH police at the Sarajevo premises of Klix.ba website, seizing documents and data, after Klix had run a story about alleged corruption in the RS National Assembly. The police seized the website equipment and detained for questioning four journalists, which they released after eight hours. They requested them to surrender the source of a wiretap in which the RS prime minister Željka Cvijanović is caught saying to have bought two MPs to ensure a majority for her party, the SNSD, in the Assembly. The raid had been preceded by a police hearing in Banja Luka, in which Klix.ba journalists had already been required to surrender their sources. According to the journalists, the raid was meant as an intimidation message to all journalists in the country. Advocacy groups and the FBiH PM Nermin Niksic condemned the raid.

The editorial independence of BiH's public broadcasters has been questioned repeatedly by authoritative observers such as the European Parliament and Freedom House, due to their close affiliations with political parties. Pro-governmental media outlets are reported as receiving a disproportionate share of advertising space, whose allocation is not transparent, and even direct subsidies through ad hoc projects.

Journalists have reported difficulties in gaining access to governmental proceedings, and politicians sometimes restrict access to public events to few "friendly" reporters. Journalists from BN TV and from Serbia's Beta News Agency are said to be banned from the premises of the President of Republika Srpska.

=== Civil defamation lawsuits ===
BiH laws stipulate liability for defamation in case of wilful or negligent dissemination of false information causing harm to natural or legal persons. The BH Journalists Association reported an average of 100 civil defamation lawsuits every year. Journalists and editors defined civil lawsuits as a strategy of politicians and businessmen to keep them busy and impede them to spend time doing their own job of investigative journalism, since they often do not have money to hire lawyers and need to defend themselves personally - or to push them to self-censorship.

- Slobodan Vasković, independent investigative journalist in Republika Srpska, counted up to 40 defamation lawsuits against him, a dozen of which from RS president Milorad Dodik. He won all lawsuits filed in Sarajevo and lost all those filed in Banja Luka.
- A journalist from the Beta News Agency was sued by RS President Milorad Dodik in 2011 after a press conference in which he claimed she published fake news and told her to leave the building. She was convicted for defamation in October 2013 by a lower court in Banja Luka, for having violated the presumption of innocence, although the court acknowledge the information published (concerning a SIPA report against Dodik on suspected criminal activities linked with construction tenders) was true and correct. The conviction and fine of 5000 BAM was reverted in appeal in August 2014.
- The weekly Slobodna Bosna was fined repeatedly by public officials. Its editor counts up to 50 civil lawsuits against the media, which was condemned to pay around €15,000 in fines between March 2014 and January 2015.
- In December 2014, a Travnik court banned Federalna TV from releasing information on three policement allegedly involved in drug trafficking, after they had filed a defamation lawsuit.

=== Cyber-attacks ===
Cyber-attacks against investigative journalism websites have increased in Bosnia and Herzegovina since the May 2014 floods, when journalists started questioning the official responses to the crisis.

- The Istinito website from Banja Luka suffered several DDoS attacks in October 2014, bringing it down for a full day each time and requiring several days to restore full capacities. The website owner said attacks came any time he published critical news against the RS President Milorad Dodik. RS Prosecutor General Mahmut Švraka told HRW they had received no reports of cyber-attacks against news sites in 2014
- In 2014 hackers attacked the websites of FENA News Agency and Buka magazine, as well as the Journalists' Association of BiH one.

=== Smear campaigns ===
Several BiH journalists experienced smear campaigns with consequences on their work and professional career.

- Slobodan Vasković, independent investigative journalist in Republika Srpska, suffered a 58-days smear campaign in 2011 by pro-governmental media outlets, including public service broadcaster RTRS and the entity-owned news agency SRNA, as well as by the Nezavisne Novine daily, up to being accused of being responsible for the killing of Zoran Đinđić. Vasković deemed the campaign as an invitation "for someone to kill me" and reported being unable to find work in RS-based media outlets since. He was publicly attacked at the end of 2015 by RS Interior Minister Dragan Lukač, according to whom "for years, Slobodan Vasković with his blog has been calling for the destruction and undermining of the institutions of Republika Srpska, especially the Ministry of Interior".
- A journalist from BETA was banned in 2011 from the presidential building in Banja Luka, where press conferences are held, and has therefore not been able to exercise her job since. President Dodik attacked the Beta News Agency publicly once more in 2013, to discredit the agency and the journalist.
- A BH Dani journalist suffered a smear campaign by Face TV in May 2014, after she criticized the media coverage of the Spring 2014 floods. She defined the campaign as full of "lies, sexism and nationalism", and reported receiving attacks from Sarajevo-based Islamists and continuous online death threats. She had to leave Sarajevo and has left journalism since.

== Transparency of media ownership ==
Transparency of media ownership refers to the public availability of accurate, comprehensive and up-to-date information about media ownership structures. A legal regime guaranteeing transparency of media ownership makes possible for the public as well as for media authorities to find out who effectively owns, controls and influences the media as well as media influence on political parties or state bodies.

In Bosnia and Herzegovina media ownership is poorly regulated. According to some experts, Bosnia and Herzegovina official institutions have never showed any interest and commitment in regulating the issue of media ownership transparency and concentration. The law regulating crucial aspects of media ownership transparency has in fact never been approved. In practice, there is not no public register containing transparency information of all media outlets operating in the country, including private and public media houses, radio stations, TVs, printed and electronic media. Transparency of ownership is addressed only by the general transparency requirements for enterprises, while a comprehensive regulation of ownership transparency and concentration is totally missing since 2006 when the Rule on media concentration and ownership over electronic and printed media expired. In general, information on real media owners can be easily concealed, thus hindering a clear and complete overview of the ownership structures.

The minimum transparency requirements is assured through the possibility of accessing documents in courts' registers. These documents are relating to all kind of businesses, including media outlets. However, these information are scattered in 15 different registers located in various cities in the country and are available under the payment of a court fee. Not all information are available online, but a comprehensive online register of businesses is available in the territory of the Federation of Bosnia and Herzegovina, but not in the Republika Srpska. The Communication Regulatory Agency (CRA) holds a register of broadcasters which is available online, even if the sections with ownership data are not made available online.

In this poorly regulated landscape, one of the major concern is the lack of policies and regulations on ownership transparency that could make possible to track both the origin of capital, flows of funding and hidden owners. It is widely suspected that the real owners of some media in the country are concealed. In some cases, opaque ownership is the result of the attempt to circumvent the legal restrictions on foreign ownership or to cover up conflict of interests, as in the case of Dnevni avaz. The point here is that the existing rules on foreign ownership and conflict of interests can be easily bypassed without actually violating the laws.

Ownership transparency is particularly problematic when it comes to electronic media outlets. In practice, there are no rules and standards requiring the disclosure of ownership data on the websites of these media, and these data are quite difficult to obtain, especially in the cases of media outlets which are operative but not officially registered as media outlets, which compromises the implementation of self-regulatory professional rules, among the others. An expert estimated that over 20 website providing online information and having certain impact randomly selected, more than half of the examined portals would have no clue about the basic information on management, including on ownership, and the names of editors and journalists. This situation can have negative implications also from a judicial point of view, since if a website with no clear information regarding ownership, violates the law, it will be difficult for the authorities to find out those responsible.

Expert Lejla Turčilo stresses the fact that in Bosnia and Herzegovina, non-transparent media ownership contributes to strengthen a negative characteristic of this society, namely clientelism. Turčilo explains that, as transparency of ownership is not guaranteed, there are cases of media outlets owned by people connected to other businesses that use their media to support such entrepreneurial activities. There are also many cases of media outlets used as political tools. This is confirmed by the Media Clientelism Index, a regional index assessing clientelism and politicization of the media in five countries of the Western Balkans which indicated that Bosnia and Herzegovina suffers a strong influence of political elites over the media. Overall, according to Turčilo, such a media environment cannot provide the public with sufficient and quality information to make an objective assessment of the media contents.

== Media ownership patterns and concentration ==
=== Overview ===
In Bosnia and Herzegovina media ownership is highly unregulated. Given the small dimension of its media market, there is no meaningful media ownership concentration, but there is a serious risk of monopolisation of the media space which is a consequence of the absence of ownership regulations. Concentration of media ownership has been totally unregulated since 2006, when the relevant law, i.e. Rules on Media Concentration and Ownership of Electronic and Print Media (adopted in 2004) expired. Competent institutions have not committed to introduce new regulations and develop proper policies in this field. The applicable law, i.e. the Law on Competition, which is relevant to all business activities, is poorly adequate to address the issue of concentration in the media sector since the Council of Competition responds to specific complaints but do not take strategic measures to limit concentration before it happens.

The Communications Regulatory Agency (CRA) has attempted to initiate policies addressing ownership concentration across different media sectors, under a general law since no specific-media regulations addressing concentration are in place. So far, state institutions, such as the Council of Competition, did not show interest and commitment to actively engage in the development of such policies.

In Bosnia and Herzegovina, the privatisation process has been uneven: if in the case or print media and newspapers it was characterized by unlawfulness and abuse of power, the privatisation of TV and radio broadcasters has never begun.

According to the South East Europe Media Observatory, the "ownership patterns include some foreign owners, major business actors, and affiliations with political parties". In Republika Srpska, political affiliations can easily be traced; they mostly link media owners to the SNSD, while in the Federation the affiliations are more diverse: this makes possible more diversity and pluralism in media content.

Influence of online media sources is growing. Generally such sources are seen as a promise of more pluralism and quality media environment. In Bosnia and Herzegovina, however, only few digital media outlets produce relevant and quality journalistic content. Most of them are financed by organisations led by media professionals and depend on the funding of international donors. However, digital media rise some transparency issues since some of them are not even registered as media businesses, thus remaining out of the reach of regulatory authorities.

As for distribution of broadcast content, the licensing procedures for allocating audio-visual and radio licenses requires a legally binding statement by licensees that have to state that they have acquired the rights to distribute their programs. The responsible body to monitor the allocation of licenses is the CRA.

=== Media ownership patterns ===
The media market in Bosnia and Herzegovina is highly fragmented. This fragmentation takes place mainly along entity and ethnic lines. In such a context, sources of revenues are scarce and media outlets have limited chances to follow an independent editorial line and to remain independent from political and economic powers. Also, media market is oversaturated: this feature has been intensified in the last decade due to the economic crisis and the increasing influence of public institutions on media financing. Overall, the media market is characterized by a large number of media operating in all sectors. Rather than a sign of pluralism, this is seen as an indicator of "political and other conflicting affiliations”.

==== Business actors and political affiliations in the media ====
Direct ownership by business actors is not common among the biggest broadcasters in Bosnia and Herzegovina. However, there are some cases of media having both business and political affiliations. The most relevant case in the radio sector is Bobar radio, owned by Bobar, a share capital company from Bijeljina, Republika Srpska. The owner of the group, which includes also the Bobar Bank, an insurance company and other companies, is connected with the party SNSD.

Political affiliations are present also in the print sector, where they are even more visible. The major newspapers in Republika Srpska, Nezavisne novine and Glas Srpske, as well as radio station Radio Nes (Banja Luka) have a common ownership, the company NIGD DNN Ltd. According to a report by the South East Europe Media Observatory, there are close relationships between one of the owner, i.e. Željko Kopanja and the leader of SNDS and this allegedly guarantee extra profit to the media outlet through government funding. Also, this connection would have made possible the appointment of some personalities within these media.

The Government of Republika Srpska and the leading SNSD party are considered to influence the majority of media in Republika Srpska. In the Federation of Bosnia and Herzegovina, political affiliations between political actors and media owners are more diverse. The two major newspapers in the Federation of BiH, namely Dnevni avaz and Oslobođenje are two prominent cases of media in which owners are business tycoons having political affiliations. The case of Dnevni Avaz is considered to be a case of hidden owner. The nominal owner of Dnevni Avaz was the businessman Fahrudin Radončić that in 2009 founded a political party (Party for Better Future, SBB) and in 2012 became the Minister of Security of BIH. For this reason the ownership of the newspaper was transferred to his ex-wife Azra Radončić. Thanks to this move, formal accusations of conflict of interests were avoided, but suspicions on Radončić's influence over the editorial line persists.

As for Oslobođenje, the major owners are two share capital companies, Sarajevska pivara and Klas, both connected with the Selimović family. The family is connected with the SDA party.

The weekly BH Dani, one of the magazine with the biggest audience share among political magazines, was considered a positive case of media plurality in Bosnia and Herzegovina but it lost this status in 2010 when it was sold to Oslobođenje and several prominent authors left.

Also some digital media are suspected of having hidden owners among political actors. According to Ljiljana Zurovac, director of the Press Council, such connections are hard to identify.

==== Major media owners ====
The major private owners in terms of audience reach of their media outlets are the owners of Pink BH television and OBN television. These two televisions, are the two broadcasters reaching out the highest audience shares in the market. Together they reach more than two million viewers.

The owner of the Pink Media Group is Željko Mitrović. The group is "the largest private commercial broadcaster of entertainment programs and the largest media group for South East Europe". Besides Pink BH, the company runs around 100 channels, available online and through cable distribution in Bosnia and Herzegovina. Mitrović was considered to be connected with the former Serbian President Milošević.

Željko Kopanja, owners of Glas Srpske, Nezavisine novine and Ness radio, and Fahrudin Radončić, that is a possible hidden owner of Dnevni Avaz and TV Alfa, control significant shares of their media companies, but as the circulation and audience share of their media outlets are low, these cases do not raise concern over media ownership concentration.

During the past years, the two dailies Oslobođenje and Dnevni avaz acted as instruments in the clashes between the two respective moguls, namely Radončić and Selimović family, and their political affiliates. This dynamic had pernicious effect on media integrity.

==== Foreign ownership ====
Three major broadcasters and one news agency are owned by foreign companies. The Law on Direct Foreign Investments establishes that foreign ownership of a business involving public communication cannot exceed 49 percent of capital. Yet, the application of this law is inadequate, and no institution with the mandate to oversee its implementation is clearly identified.

Another ownership pattern is that of media outlet owned by domestic company owned by foreign entities. This is the case, for instance, of Al Jazeera Balkans, registered in Sarajevo, and owned by Al Jazeera Network owned by Al Jazeera Media Network from Qatar.

== See also ==
- Telecommunications in Bosnia and Herzegovina
- Access to public information in Bosnia and Herzegovina
