= Hum Tower =

Telecommunication tower in Sarajevo, Bosnia and Herzegovina

- Toranj Hum
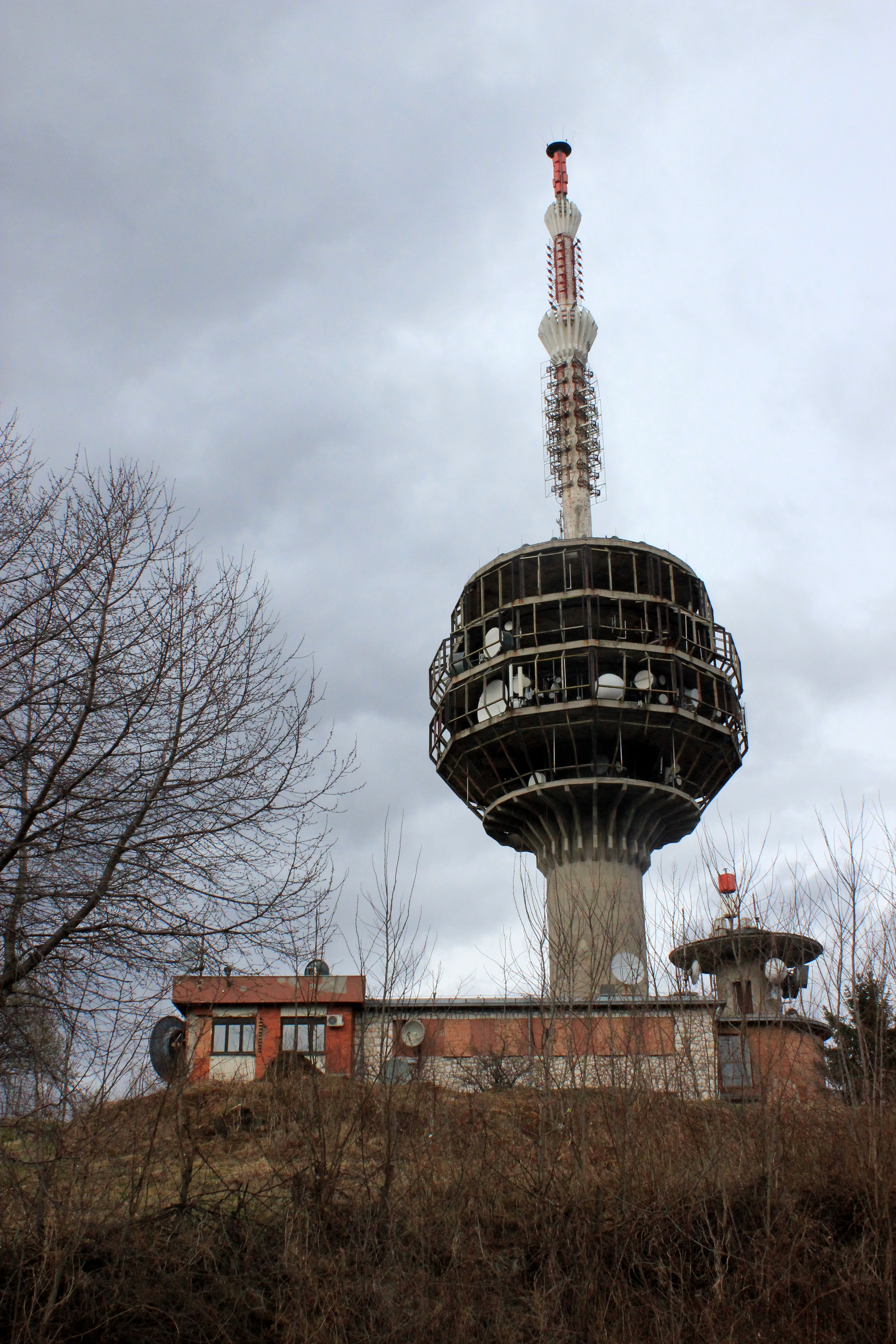
- Interactive map of the Hum Tower area

General information
- Type: Telecommunications and observation tower
- Location: Mount Hum, Sarajevo, Bosnia and Herzegovina
- Coordinates: 43°52′20.9″N 18°23′11.3″E
- Construction started: 1960
- Completed: 11 May 1982; partially rebuilt after 1995

The Hum Tower (Bosnian: Toranj Hum / Predajnik Hum) is a 78.5 m (258 ft) tall telecommunication tower located on Mount Hum, on the outskirts of Sarajevo, Bosnia and Herzegovina. The original tower was completed in the 1960s and rebuilt in the 1980s. During the Bosnian War, on 2 May 1992, it was partly destroyed by the JNA and the VRS.

== History ==
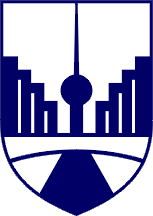
Hum Tower is part of the coat of arms of Novo Sarajevo municipality.

The Hum Tower has become one of the most important landmarks of Sarajevo, the capital of Bosnia and Herzegovina. The TV transmitter was built in the 1980s at an altitude of 812 metres. It consists of a building and a reinforced concrete pillar 78.5 m (258 ft) high.

The antenna mast carried a UHF TV antenna system, a VHF TV antenna system and a VHF FM antenna system, which broadcast analog radio and television signals. The facility was primarily used by RTV Sarajevo (Radio Televizija Sarajevo), which broadcast four radio and three television programmes until 1992: TVSA, TVSA 2, TVSA 3, Radio Sarajevo 1, Sarajevo 202, Radio Sarajevo 2 and Radio Sarajevo 3.

During the Bosnian War, in 1992, the antenna tower and the building suffered major damage, which was partially repaired after the war. The building and broadcasting equipment are under constant surveillance by technicians from the national public broadcaster, BHRT.

According to international obligations, Bosnia and Herzegovina planned to switch to digital broadcasting in April 2014, but the deadline was missed. Within the first phase of digitalisation in Bosnia and Herzegovina, a DVB-T transmitter, a UHF antenna system, digital RR links and a parabolic antenna were installed at the Hum facility. The installed DVB-T transmitter was expected to broadcast programmes of the public broadcasters BHT 1, FTV and RTRS. Commissioning of the equipment was expected in mid-2016.

=== Radio and TV frequencies ===
- BHRT – BH Radio 1
- BHRT – BHT 1
- RTVFBiH – Federalni Radio
- RTVFBiH – Federalna televizija
