= Barimba =

- Also known as: Šta ste danas uradili? (What Did You Do Today?)
- Genre: Animated TV series
- Created by: Dževad Hadžić
- Starring: Mirsad Abdagić · Alma Merunka · Mario Drmać
- Country of origin: Bosnia and Herzegovina
- Original language: Bosnian
- No. of seasons: 7
- No. of episodes: 162

Production
- Running time: 25 minutes
- Production company: Marletti d.o.o.

Original release
- Network: FTV
- Release: 2004 – 2021

Barimba or Šta ste danas uradili? is a Bosnian animated series. It was broadcast on FTV and BHT 1 as part of children's programming, and produced by Marletti d.o.o Sarajevo from 2004 to 2014. It stopped airing on FTV in 2021.

The series also has an alternative title, "What Did You Do Today?", used from 2004 to 2010.

From 2008 onward, the second season aired, lasting 25 minutes, unlike the first season which lasted up to 10 minutes.

== Plot ==
Captain Barimba visits Ida and Kiki each night to talk about their day and teach them new things. The Barimba Band also performs songs before bedtime. The show encourages children to reflect on their daily actions.

== Characters ==
- Barimba: A captain who grants wishes and takes children on adventures.
- Children: Kiki and Ida, curious explorers who travel with Barimba.
- Bibi the Camel: A camel who tells daily jokes and explores Barimba's island.
- Barimba Band: A group performing bedtime songs.

== Cast ==
- Mirsad Abdagić as Barimba and Topuz
- Alma Merunka as Ida and Mili
- Mario Drmać as Kiki, Bibi the Camel, and Boco

== Trivia ==
- Barimba appears in the TV show Mali šlager (2005).
- A special episode was produced to help children after floods in Bosnia and Herzegovina, supported by UNICEF and other organizations.
