= List of newspapers in Bosnia and Herzegovina =

This is a partial list of newspapers in Bosnia and Herzegovina.

== Daily newspapers ==
Newspapers in Bosnia and Herzegovina
Newspaper	Established	Headquarters	Frequency	Owner / Publisher	Website	Press Council BiH Member	ISSN Number	Notes
Dnevni avaz	2 October 1993; 32 years ago	Sarajevo; Tešanjska 24b Avaz Twist Tower; 71000 Sarajevo, BiH	Daily	AVAZ ROTO PRESS d.o.o.	www.avaz.ba	✓	1840 - 3522	Dnevni avaz (English: Daily voice) evolved from a monthly publication Bošnjački Avaz. In 1994 it became known simply as Avaz and was published weekly in BiH and Germany. In 1995 it was reestablished by Fahrudin Radončić as a daily newspaper. Avaz is part of the Avaz publishing house, the biggest news house in Bosnia and Herzegovina.
Oslobođenje	30 August 1943; 82 years ago	Sarajevo; Džemala Bijedića 185; 71000 Sarajevo, BiH	Daily	Oslobođenje d.o.o.	www.oslobodjenje.ba	✓	2232 - 9986	Oslobođenje (English: Liberation) was founded in Donja Trnova near Ugljevik, as an anti-nazi newspaper. During the Bosnian war and the Siege of Sarajevo, the Oslobođenje staff operated out of a makeshift newsroom in a bomb shelter after its 10-story office building had been destroyed. During the war, its staff managed to print the newspaper every day except for one.
Nezavisne novine	27 December 1995; 30 years ago	Banja Luka; Braće Pišteljića 1; 78000 Banja Luka, BiH	Daily	NIGD "DNN" d.o.o.	www.nezavisne.com	✓	Unknown	Today's Nezavisne novine (English: Independent newspapers) emerged from a daily publication Dnevne nezavisne novine which were the first private newspaper in Republika Srpska entity. The first editor was Željko Kopanja. Following the paper's reporting on atrocities committed by Bosnian Serbs, Kopanja was denounced by some groups as a traitor, and began to receive death threats. On 22 October 1999, he was nearly killed by a car bomb that exploded as he turned the ignition key. A nearby hospital amputated both of his legs. Since 2000, the newspaper changed its name and expand the target audience of the entire territory of Bosnia and Herzegovina.
Glas Srpske	15 September 1992; 33 years ago	Banja Luka; Braće Pišteljića 1; 78000 Banja Luka, BiH	Daily	Glas Srpske a.d.	www.glassrpske.com	✓	2303 - 7385	Today's Glas Srpske (Srpski: Глас Српске; English: Voice of Srpska) was founded as Glas in Župica near Drvar, as an anti-nazi newspaper from NOP. It was monthly publication for Bosanska Krajina area. In 1992, the newspaper changed its name, editorial policy and audience. During the Bosnian war, National Assembly of Republika Srpska issued a decision that newspaper goes out as The daily newspapers of the Republika Srpska. Since 5 May 2003 the newspaper comes out under the new name "Glas Srpske" in Cyrillic script.
Press RS	2011; 15 years ago	Banja Luka; Dr Mladena Stojanovića 29; 78000 Banja Luka, BiH	Daily	NPC International d.o.o.	www.pressrs.ba	✓	2233-176X	Press RS also has its own web portal. The company NPC International also issues a magazine called Zdravo živo.
EuroBlic	4 July 2000; 26 years ago	Banja Luka; Miše Stupara 3; 78000 Banja Luka, BiH	Daily	Ringier Axel Springer d.o.o.	www.blic.rs	✓	2233-176X	EuroBlic is a daily middle-market tabloid newspaper in Republika Srpska. Founded in 2000, EuroBlic is currently owned by Ringier Axel Springer Media AG, a joint venture between Ringier media corporation from Switzerland and Axel Springer AG from Germany. The joint Swiss-German entity owns and operates EuroBlic through Blic its Serbian subsidiary Ringier Axel Springer d.o.o. (formerly Blic Press d.o.o. and Ringier d.o.o.), a limited liability company. EuroBlic also issues a magazine called Blic žena and Blic plus.
Dnevni list	2001; 25 years ago	Mostar; Kralja Petra Krešimira IV 66/2; 88000 Mostar, BiH	Daily	DL TRGOVINA d.o.o. Mostar, Bosnia and Herzegovina	www.dnevni-list.ba	✓	1512 - 8792	Dnevni list is daily newspaper (English: Daily Courier) is a popular daily newspaper in Bosnia and Herzegovina. Its headquarters is in Mostar. The paper is especially popular among the nation of the Croats and Bosniaks. The paper was founded in 2001 and it has a pro-Croats stance.
Večernji list BiH	2007; 19 years ago	Mostar; Kralja Zvonimira 13; 88000 Mostar, BiH	Daily	Večernji list d.o.o. Zagreb, Croatia; Styria Media Group	www.vecernji.ba	✓	1333 - 9192	Večernji list BiH is daily edition of Večernji list for Bosnia and Herzegovina (English: Evening Courier) and it is considered as conservative newspaper owned by Styria Media Group. Večernji list was started in Zagreb in 1959.
Puls24.ba	2026, 1 year ago	Vitez, Hrvatskih Branitelja, 72256, Vitez, BiH	Daily	Crest Post	https://www.puls24.ba/	×	×	Puls24.ba is a Bosnian news portal created for new generations. In addition to delivering daily news from the local area and the wider region, it offers a range of practical service tools that support the needs of the local community on a daily basis. Puls24.ba is the first new-generation hyperlocal news platform in Bosnia and Herzegovina, operating as an independent outlet.

== Weekly and biweekly newspapers ==
=== Sarajevo ===
- BH Dani
- Start BiH

=== Banja Luka ===
- Novi reporter

=== Zenica ===
- Naša riječ

=== Bijeljina ===
- Semberske novine

=== Velika Kladuša ===
- Reprezent

=== Tomislavgrad ===
- Naša ognjišta

=== Tuzla ===
- Hrvatski glasnik
- Front Slobode
