= Zukić =

Zukić is a surname. Notable people with the surname include:

- Amir Zukić (politician) (born 1966), Bosnian politician
- Amir Zukić (TV host) (born 1972), Bosnian television host and media manager
- Dejan Zukić (born 2001), Serbian footballer
- Muhidin Zukić (born 1971), retired Bosnian-Herzegovinian footballer
- Seid Zukić (born 1994), Bosnian footballer
- Zoran Zukić (born 1981), Serbian footballer
