= Televizija Republike Srpske =

Bosnian television channel

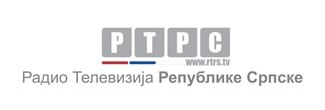
- RTRS TV network logo
- Country: Bosnia and Herzegovina
- Broadcast area: Republika Srpska, Bosnia and Herzegovina
- Network: RTRS
- Affiliates: Radio RS
- Headquarters: Banja Luka; Trg Republike Srpske No. 9 (TV Dom)

Programming
- Language: Serbian
- Picture format: 16:9 576i (SDTV)

Ownership
- Owner: RTRS
- Key people: Dijana Milanković (head of RTRS)
- Sister channels: RTRS PLUS

History
- Launched: 19 April 1992; 34 years ago
- Former names: Канал С ТВ РС

Links
- Website: www.rtrs.tv

Availability

Terrestrial
- Terrestrial signal: Across Republika Srpska and Bosnia and Herzegovina

Streaming media
- RTRS Player: Watch live

Televizija Republike Srpske (Cyrillic: Телевизија Републике Српске, "Television of Republika Srpska"; locally known simply as RTRS (Cyrillic: РТРС)) is a Bosnian entity-level public television channel operated by Radio Televizija Republike Srpske (RTRS).

The channel broadcasts daily, 24 hours a day, from RTRS headquarters in Banja Luka. Programmes are mainly produced in the Serbian language. The channel broadcasts a variety of programmes, including news, talk shows, documentaries, sports, films, magazine programmes and children's programming.

== See also ==
- Radio Televizija Republike Srpske
- RTVFBiH
- BHRT
