= Televizija Herceg-Bosne =

Bosnia and Herzegovina television channel

- Country: Bosnia and Herzegovina
- Broadcast area: Bosnia and Herzegovina
- Network: RTVHB
- Affiliates: Radio HB
- Headquarters: Mostar; Trg hrvatskih velikana (TV Dom)

Programming
- Language(s): Croatian
- Picture format: 16:9 1080i (HDTV)

Ownership
- Owner: Public service broadcaster
- Key people: Slavica Karačić (Head of RTVHB)

History
- Launched: 1 July 2019

Links
- Website: www.rtv-hb.com

Availability

Terrestrial
- Terrestrial signal: Across Bosnia and Herzegovina

Streaming media
- on website

Televizija Herceg-Bosne (English: Television of Herzeg-Bosnia locally known just as RTVHB) is a Bosnia and Herzegovina public TV channel operated by RTVHB. The radio and television program is mainly produced in Croatian. This television channel broadcasts a variety of programs such as news, talk shows, documentaries, sports, movies, children's programs, etc.

== Line-up ==
=== News program ===
- Dnevnik - Main news program broadcast every night at 19:30 with live reports, guest interviews and weather forecasts
- Vijesti - News at 17:00
- Zrcalo tjedna - Review of the weekly events

=== Documentary/talk shows ===
- Kompas - Political night talk show
- Fokus - Talk show

=== Sports program ===
- Sprint - Sport news
- Portret prvaka - Interviews with sportspeople

== See also ==
- Radiotelevizija Herceg-Bosne
- Radio Televizija Republike Srpske
- RTVFBiH
