= Federalna.ba =

- Website type: News media
- Available in: Bosnian language
- Owner: RTVFBiH
- Creators: Federalna TV and Federalni Radio
- Website: www.federalna.ba
- Commercial: Yes
- Registration: No
- Current status: Online
- It also serves as a VOD portal for programs of the RTVFBiH.

Federalna.ba is a popular web portal in Bosnia and Herzegovina. It was founded in October 2011 as a new web portal for Federalna Televizija and Federalni Radio.

The owner of Federalna.ba is RTVFBiH, a Bosnian entity level public service broadcaster.

== See also ==
- Media in Sarajevo
- Media of Bosnia and Herzegovina
