= RTRS PLUS =

Bosnian TV channel

- Country: Bosnia and Herzegovina
- Broadcast area: Republika Srpska entity
- Network: RTRS
- Headquarters: Banja Luka; Trg Republike Srpske br. 9

Programming
- Language(s): Serbian
- Picture format: 16:9 576i (SDTV)

Ownership
- Owner: Public service broadcaster
- Sister channels: RTRS

History
- Launched: 19 April 2015

Links
- Website: plus.rtrs.tv

Availability

Streaming media
- RTRS Player: on website

RTRS PLUS (Cyrillic: РТРС ПЛУС) is a Bosnian public cable TV channel operated by RTRS. The program is broadcast on a daily basis from RTRS headquarters located in Banja Luka. The radio and television program is mainly produced in Serbian and Cyrillic. This television channel broadcasts a variety of programs such as flash news, talk shows, documentaries, movies, mosaic, and children's programs.

== See also ==
- RTRS
- BHRT
- RTRS
- RTVFBiH
- RTVHB
