= FENA =

Bosnian news agency

Federal News Agency (FENA)
- Type: State-owned company
- Industry: News media
- Founded: 2000
- Headquarters: Sarajevo, Bosnia and Herzegovina
- Key people: Elmir Huremović (Director); Ilija Musa (Assistant director); Dejan Jazvić (Editor in chief); Fedžad Forto (Deputy Editor-in-Chief - Sarajevo)
- Products: Wire service
- Owner: Government of FBiH via JU Federalna novinska agencija FENA
- Website: www.fena.ba
- Footnotes; Member of European Alliance of News Agencies

Federal News Agency (Serbo-Croatian: Federalna novinska agencija / Федерална новинска агенција; abbr. FENA / ФЕНА) is the government-owned national news agency of the Federation of Bosnia and Herzegovina.

== History ==
It was established in 2000 by a Decree of the Government of the Federation of Bosnia and Herzegovina for the purpose of performing news and agency activities of importance to the FBiH.

The FENA news agency was created by merging the former entity-owned agencies BH Press Sarajevo and Habena Mostar. The head office is based in Sarajevo (Ćemaluša 1, 71 000 Sarajevo and Obala Kulina bana 16, 71 000 Sarajevo) and in Mostar (Ante Starčevića bb, 88 000 Mostar).

Every day, FENA publishes an average of about 250 news items in the official languages of Bosnia and Herzegovina (BHS) and English, and in addition to general and specialist news services, it publishes an increasing number of photo and video content.

According to the media reports, FENA's correspondent network is spread throughout Bosnia and Herzegovina, because they have taken their role in the media sector seriously and publish news from all over the country on a daily basis.

== FENA Offices ==
FENA correspondent offices in Bosnia and Herzegovina:

- Sarajevo
- Mostar
- Tuzla
- Brčko (planned)
- Bihać (planned)
- Banja Luka (planned)

In addition to the FENA news agency, in Bosnia and Herzegovina also operate:

- SRNA - entity level news agency of Republika Srpska
- KTA BK BiH - Catholic news agency of the Bishops' Conference of Bosnia and Herzegovina by Bishops' Conference of BiH
- MINA News Agency - Muslim informative news agency by Islamic Community of Bosnia and Herzegovina
- ONASA - Independent news agency from Sarajevo - ONASA
- Agencija Anadolija - sister company of Anadolu Agency for Bosnia and Herzegovina

== Associations ==
Since 22 September 2017, FENA news agency is first and full member of European Alliance of News Agencies. from Bosnia and Herzegovina.

Also, FENA news agency is member of non-profit professional association ABNA-SE, regional association of the news agencies of South East European countries (Bosnia and Herzegovina, Croatia, Serbia, Macedonia, Albania, Kosovo, Bulgaria, Romania, Turkey, Greece and Cyprus).

== FENA Services ==
The news services are available in Bosnian, Croatian and English language.

- Vijesti (News) - general news service
  - Najave događaja (Event announcements) - schedules of daily events in BiH
  - Stranačke aktivnosti (Activities of political parties) - review of statements and notices from political parties
  - FENA.BIZ (Business/economic service) - the largest overview of economic events in the Bosnia and Herzegovina, PR company announcements, information from the Sarajevo Stock Exchange and Banja Luka Stock Exchange
  - Servisne informacije (Service information) - traffic and weather services
- Foto servis (Photo service) - recordings of photos for newspapers and web portals
- Video servis (Video service) - recording statements for TV and web portals
  - FENA LIVE - a new service through which FENA will inform its customers, as well as the general public in Bosnia and Herzegovina and the world about the most important events, by broadcasting live video signals.
- News in English - news summary in English

== See also ==
- BHRT
- Television in Bosnia and Herzegovina
- List of radio stations in Bosnia and Herzegovina
- Media of Bosnia and Herzegovina
