= Radio and Television of Bosnia and Herzegovina =

Bosnian public radio and TV broadcasting organization

- The official organization logo used since 2007.

- BHRT's headquarters in Sarajevo
- Type: Broadcast radio, television and online
- Country: Bosnia and Herzegovina
- First air date: 10 April 1945; 81 years ago (radio); 1 June 1961; 65 years ago (television)
- Availability: Bosnia and Herzegovina Worldwide via IPTV platforms
- Motto: Jedan za sve. (One for All.)
- TV stations: BHT1
- Radio stations: BH Radio 1
- Headquarters: RTV Dom, Sarajevo
- Key people: Belmin Karamehmedović (General-Director) Neda Tadić (head of BHT1) Dejan Kerleta (head of BH Radio 1) Jasmin Ferović (head of MP BHRT)
- Former names: RTV Sarajevo Public Broadcasting Service of BiH
- Callsigns: BHRT
- Callsign meaning: Radiotelevizija Bosne i Hercegovine (Bosanskohercegovačka radiotelevizija)
- Former callsigns: RTVSA, RTVBiH, PBSBiH
- Affiliation: RTVFBiH RTRS
- Official website: bhrt.ba
- Language: Bosnian, Croatian, Serbian

Radiotelevizija Bosne i Hercegovine (abbr. BHRT), or Radio and Television of Bosnia and Herzegovina, is the national public broadcaster of Bosnia and Herzegovina. It is the only member of the European Broadcasting Union (EBU) from Bosnia and Herzegovina, and the central institution of the public broadcasting system of BiH, a unique structure that also includes the entity-level broadcasters Radio and Television of the Federation of Bosnia and Herzegovina (RTVFBiH) and Radio and Television of Republika Srpska (RTRS). As of February 2026, it employs 700 staff.

== History ==
=== Early years: RTV Sarajevo (1945–1992) ===
The history of electronic media in Bosnia and Herzegovina began on April 10th 1945, with the first broadcast of Radio Sarajevo beginning with the words "This is Radio Sarajevo. Death to fascism - freedom to the people". Television Sarajevo (TVSA) aired its first program on June 1st 1961, initially relying on studios in Zagreb and Belgrade. It became a constituent member of the Yugoslav Radio and Television (JRT) network.

Key developments included the launch of its own TV news magazine, "Nightly Screen" (bos. Večernji ekran), on March 17th 1969, and its flagship "TV Journal" (bos. TV Dnevnik) on February 25th 1971. The local radio station, Sarajevo 202, began broadcasting on July 1st 1971, quickly becoming a symbol of the city's urban culture and a platform for young journalists. Radio Sarajevo 3 was launched in 1973 and was dedicated to scientific and theoretical considerations, classical music and art.

In early 1975, the first phase of the construction of the Broadcasting House (bos. RTV Dom) in Sarajevo was completed, which gave RTV Sarajevo adequate production and editorial space along with new electronic equipment. At the same time, Radio Sarajevo 2 was launched as a correspondent network, which would account for more than 50 local radio stations, with a coverage of about 80% of the population of SR Bosnia and Herzegovina. TVSA 2 was also launched, and numerous awards and recognitions came to this media house in the 1970s and 1980s.

The largest project of TVSA was the monitoring and transmission of the 14th Winter Olympic Games held from February 8th to 19th 1984 in Sarajevo. To accomplish this task, TVSA received new production facilities in the Broadcasting House and the most modern technical equipment. TVSA received recognition for this demanding project from many large radio and television companies and associations. With TVSA 1 in 1985, it covered 79%, and with TVSA 2, 57% of the territory of the SR of Bosnia and Herzegovina.

Following the 1984 Olympics, TVSA entered a period of significant innovation and cultural influence. Under cultural and art programming director Slobodan Terzić, the broadcaster revamped its schedule and began producing elaborate in-house productions and acquiring Western programs. It became a crucial platform for the burgeoning Sarajevo music scene, producing the first music videos for bands that would achieve regional fame, such as Crvena Jabuka, Plavi Orkestar, and Dino Merlin.

A particularly significant innovation was the Youth Program on Radio Sarajevo 2, launched in 1987 under editor-in-chief Boro Kontrić. The program served as a launchpad for a generation of artists and journalists, featuring surreal and satirical content from the collective "Top List of the Surrealists" (bos. Top lista nadrealista) and pioneering broadcasts of alternative Western music like acid house and hip-hop. This creative environment extended to the short-lived commercial channel TVSA 3 in 1989, which further pushed boundaries with youth-oriented programming.

=== The Bosnian War (1992–1995) ===
Following the independence of Bosnia and Herzegovina and the outbreak of the Bosnian War in 1992, RTV Sarajevo was forced to suspend its secondary channels, TVSA 2 and TVSA 3, along with the radio stations Radio Sarajevo 202, Radio Sarajevo 2 and Radio Sarajevo 3. Its operations were consolidated into a single, vital service that, under the name Radio and Television of Bosnia and Herzegovina (RTVBiH), became a lifeline for the besieged population of Sarajevo and a symbol of resistance. The Broadcasting House, commonly nicknamed The Grey House (bos. Sivi dom), was a constant target of shelling. The most severe attack occurred on June 28, 1995, when a direct hit caused extensive damage. Footage of the aftermath was later broadcast. Staff and journalists lived and worked in the building under constant threat, some even sacrificing their lives for journalism. Despite this, broadcasts never went off-air throughout the war. Journalist Duška Jurišić recalled, "The goal was to report. If you don't have a 30-minute show at 7:30, you haven't fulfilled your goal." On January 1, 1993, RTVBiH was admitted as an active member of the EBU.

=== Post–War Restructuring (2000–2004) ===
After the war, the international community, through the Office of the High Representative (OHR), mandated a complete overhaul of the broadcasting system. On October 23, 2000, High Representative Wolfgang Petritsch imposed The Public Broadcasting System Restructuring Act. This decision legally dissolved the old RTVBiH and established three new entities:

- Public Broadcasting Service of BiH (PBSBiH, later BHRT): The state-level broadcaster.
- Radio and Television of the Federation of BiH (RTVFBiH): The public broadcaster for the Federation of BiH.
- Radio and Television of Republika Srpska (RTRS): The public broadcaster for Republika Srpska.

The decision also created a central body, the System Board, to coordinate the system and manage the distribution of the RTV tax. BH Radio 1 officially started on May 7, 2001, on the same day as the Federal Radio, and the first news program of BHT1 aired exactly a year later, marking the symbolic start of the new public service.

From May 2002 to August 2004, PBSBiH's TV channel, BHTV1, had no frequencies of its own, as it handed them over to FTV as part of the Restructuring Act. Both FTV and RTRS gave certain time slots from their own programming to BHTV1 for their news and special programs, in order to reach the audience nationwide. In August 2004, a rebranded BHT1 launched with its own nationwide frequencies, covering more than 90% of the country, and its own programming that's broadcast 20 hours a day.

The restructuring had significant cultural consequences. In line with the new law that limited entity broadcasters to one television and one radio channel, the legendary urban station Radio Sarajevo 202 (which was revived and operated by RTVFBiH in 2000s) was forced to cease broadcasting on January 1, 2010, after 38 years on air. In a public statement, the radio's staff condemned the decision as "a concrete and open slap to all citizens of Sarajevo and BiH," arguing that it destroyed a symbol of the city. The closure sparked strong public outcry, with former employees and citizen groups expressing outrage that a decades-old institution was being eliminated "because the law says so."

During the 2022 FIFA World Cup, the corporation's portal received a record number of visits from inside Bosnia and Herzegovina.

== Organization and structure ==
The Public RTV System of BiH is a legally mandated, yet deeply fragmented structure.

- BHRT (State Level): Operates the TV channel BHT1, the radio station BH Radio 1, a Music Production unit, and online services. It is the legal successor to the archives and international rights of RTV Sarajevo, holds the EBU membership, and represents Bosnia and Herzegovina at the Eurovision Song Contest. Most of their programs are produced from the Broadcasting House in Sarajevo. A network of Information and Technical Centers (ITC) has been developed in other cities of Bosnia and Herzegovina: Bihać, Banja Luka, Mostar, Tuzla and Zenica.
- RTVFBiH (Federation Entity Level): Operates Federal Television (FTV) and Federal Radio. It was established from a part of the former RTVBiH.
- RTRS (Republika Srpska Entity Level): Operates Television of Republika Srpska, RTRS Plus and Radio of Republika Srpska. It was formed in 1993 from the unification of studios in Banja Luka and Eastern Sarajevo.

The System Board, designed to be the central coordinating body, has been paralyzed by political disputes. It has not functioned effectively for years, with RTRS frequently boycotting its sessions, which has prevented decisions on critical issues like adjusting the RTV tax.

== Critical challenges and crises ==
=== Chronic financial crisis and funding collapse ===
BHRT's modern history is a chronicle of survival amid existential threats stemming from a deliberately sabotaged and dysfunctional funding model. The public broadcasting system is funded by a monthly license fee (RTV tax of 7.5 KM as of 2025), collected via electricity bills and distributed as 50% to BHRT, 25% to RTVFBiH, and 25% to RTRS. This model has completely broken down, creating a permanent state of insolvency for the state-level broadcaster.

The primary cause of the crisis is the systemic withholding of funds. RTRS, which collects the tax on its territory, has for years refused to transfer BHRT's 50% share. By 2025, this debt had ballooned to over 100 million KM, despite rulings from the Constitutional Court of BiH and the Supreme Court of RS confirming the practice is illegal. Concurrently, politicians from parties like the HDZ BiH and SNSD have openly encouraged non-payment of the tax in the Federation, leading to a collection rate of only around 50.58% in the first half of 2025.

The system's central coordinating body, the System Board, has been paralyzed by political disputes and has not functioned effectively for years. Its inactivity since 2019 has frozen the RTV tax rate at 2013 levels, causing significant real-term revenue loss. The managements of BHRT and RTVFBiH estimated this was costing them a combined 300,000 KM per month as of 2025. In September 2025, the two broadcasters held a joint session, publicly declaring the situation "economically unsustainable" and calling for external intervention, as internal resolution was impossible.

As a direct result, BHRT has accumulated catastrophic debts: over 21 million KM to the European Broadcasting Union (EBU), 9.6 million KM in VAT, 1.5 million KM to the state electricity company, and over 50 million KM in unpaid salaries and contributions to its employees. The EBU has threatened to block BHRT's accounts and seize its assets if the debt is not resolved by February 2026.

BHRT has faced near-shutdown scenarios repeatedly (e.g., 2015, 2016, 2022, 2024). BHRT was supposed to suspend its operations from 1 July 2016, a date selected on purpose because of its commitments to the annual anniversary memorial of the Srebrenica massacre and its coverage of UEFA Euro 2016, but it was meant to be provisional. The crisis reached an unprecedented peak in 2025. In June, the BHRT Board of Directors warned that "in this media house, the lights have truly already been turned off and it's a question of days when complete darkness will come." By November 2025, Acting General Director Belmin Karamehmedović condemned the political inaction, stating that the Parliament was "doing nothing to help" and warning of the broadcaster's imminent collapse in its 80th year. This political disregard was starkly demonstrated when the Presidency of Bosnia and Herzegovina adopted a draft state budget for 2025 that excluded any financial assistance for BHRT, prompting a desperate appeal for survival from the broadcaster's Independent Trade Union. This draft was subsequently passed by the Parliamentary Assembly on November 17, 2025. During the debate, the Minister of Finance, Srđan Amidžić, stated that making BHRT a direct budgetary beneficiary was "not in line with the Law on BHRT," effectively closing the door on a state-funded rescue and confirming the political establishment's refusal to intervene despite the existential threat.

Following the budget's adoption, the political hostility towards BHRT was laid bare. MInister Amidžić shifted the blame for the crisis onto the broadcaster's own management, publicly stating, "You know where the solution is, fire the incompetent management that has done what it's done," and comparing BHRT's request for state aid to an Italian broadcaster asking the BiH government for help. Meanwhile, Sanja Vulić, a member of parliament from the SNSD, stated her party had "nothing against" the European Union paying BHRT's debt, but that using state funds would be an unacceptable transfer of competencies, arguing that cultural institutions like BHRT were "not a constituent part of the Constitution."

=== Political interference and editorial pressure ===
Beyond the structural funding issues, BHRT and the public broadcasting system are plagued by internal mismanagement and deep-seated political interference. A 2024 report described the broadcasters as "hostages of political interests," citing non-transparent business practices, inadequate management, and political influence over editorial policy.

The Board of Directors, whose members are appointed by the Parliamentary Assembly of BiH, has been accused of acting as a "Trojan horse" for political parties, with a history of pressuring and dismissing senior managers and editors. Despite legal mandates, the central coordinating body for the system, the Corporation of Public Broadcasters, has never been established due to political blockades, primarily from parties in Republika Srpska and Croatian-nationalist parties, preventing any systemic reform.

The leadership of both BHRT and RTVFBiH have been criticized for operating their services as private fiefdoms, with their management tenures often extending far beyond their legal mandates due to political deadlock over appointments.

BHRT has been a constant target of political pressure from nationalist parties across the ethnic divide. The most direct attacks have come from officials in Republika Srpska. In 2011, following public statements by the President of RS Milorad Dodik and Premier Aleksandar Džombić, calling for the abolition of BHRT, and encouraging non-payment of the RTV tax, BHRT's management issued a public letter, condemning the "incendiary and inflammatory statements." This hostility has often translated into official boycotts, with RS government officials refusing to give statements to BHRT journalists.

The issue of BHRT is considered an internal one of BiH by Milorad Dodik, the president of RS and SNSD, who in 2024, recalled that the international community imposed the Law on PBS. "BHRT was not even formed as a result of an internal agreement between Republika Srpska and the Federation, that's why it's like this," Dodik wrote on the social media Twitter/X. He called BHRT "a service for Muslims," and concluded that "it should not exist as such" in 2022.

On the editorial side, BHRT has faced criticism from Bosniak and Croatian political leaders as well. A significant internal scandal erupted in 2021 when a BHRT news anchor referred to the Army of RBiH as "so-called", leading to the immediate suspension of the anchor and the news editor.

=== Internal system conflict ===
The relationship between the three broadcasters was often antagonistic. In May 2024, BHRT cut FTV's signal for several hours, accusing it of not paying for transmission services. FTV responded by filing criminal charges against BHRT's management, and a local court quickly ordered BHRT to restore the signal, forcing it to provide services without payment. This also made BHRT temporarily suspend 15 of their shows, shortening some as well. This dispute was rooted in significant inter-entity debt; by 2025, BHRT claimed that RTVFBiH owed it over 14 million KM for services rendered, while RTRS's debt for unpaid tax shares exceeded 95 million KM.

=== Digitalisation standoff ===
The transition to Digital Video Broadcasting – Second Generation (DVB-T2) in Bosnia and Herzegovina has been one of the most delayed and politically obstructed technological reforms in Europe, spanning over 15 years. The process has been characterized by missed international deadlines, political blockades, and technical decay.

The process was officially launched with the goal of switching from analog to digital broadcasting by the international deadline of June 17th 2015. In 2013, the Ministry of Transport and Communications announced ambitious plans, aiming to have the first phase of digitalization ready for the 2014 FIFA World Cup and the entire country covered by the 2015 deadline. BHRT successfully completed the first phase of digitizing its production capacities using its own funds by the end of 2014. However, the project to build the nationwide transmission network was paralyzed. Former BHRT director Mehmed Agović identified "obstructions from Republika Srpska" as the main obstacle, accusing the entity's authorities of preventing the installation of purchased equipment on RTRS facilities and the Council of Ministers of blocking the spending of already approved funds.

As a result, Bosnia and Herzegovina became the only country in Europe to miss the June 17, 2015 deadline. The consequences were immediate. On the day of the deadline, the first analog transmitter was switched off on the request of Serbia, as the unshielded analog signal from BiH interfered with neighboring countries' new digital signals. This left a wide area of Eastern Bosnia without a BHRT signal. The Regulator Agency for Communications (RAK) warned that further shutdowns were possible.

After a year of further delays, test digital broadcasting by the three public broadcasters finally began on October 14, 2016, covering only Sarajevo, Banja Luka, and Mostar. The launch was delayed by two weeks at the request of RTRS. At the ceremony, BHRT director Belmin Karamehmedović emphasized that the broadcasters had done their part "despite the difficult situation," while RTVFBiH director Džemal Šabić lamented that "ideology had interfered with the IT revolution."

The process effectively stalled after the limited test launch. By 2017, BHRT employees described the digitalization process as "halted halfway," with purchased equipment becoming obsolete and qualified technical staff leaving due to the broadcaster's financial crisis. The situation led to real-world consequences for citizens. In 2022, following complaints from Croatia that analog signals from BiH were interfering with its 5G network, RAK ordered the shutdown of over 150 analog transmitters across the country. This left an estimated 20% of the population, particularly in rural areas, without a television signal, as the nationwide digital network to replace it was still not operational.

A commercial operator, VidiTV, launched a limited DVB-T2 service in 2022, covering some urban areas. However, the comprehensive state-led project remained dormant until a new contract was signed in January 2024.

Under Minister Edin Forto, a renewed effort began. In July 2025, the DVB-T2 signal was officially launched in Sarajevo, Mostar, and Banja Luka, with Forto acknowledging BiH was "the last European country" to do so. However, the rollout was immediately marred by a new political dispute over control of the signal distribution.

Minister Forto signed a decision assigning the "Majevica" digital region, which includes the populous Tuzla Canton, to be fed by the RTRS headend in Banja Luka instead of the BHRT headend in Sarajevo. BHRT leadership rejected this decision, citing a 2015 RAK decision which granted exclusive authority over the method of broadcasting to the joint Board of the Public RTV System, not the Ministry. This move was criticized as handing control of a key region in the Federation to the broadcaster from Republika Srpska, further complicating the final stages of the digital transition.

Despite this, a major milestone was reached in September 2025 with the installation of the country's largest antenna system on Mount Vlašić. The entire project, comprising 156 locations, was slated for completion by December 2025, finally promising to bring Bosnia and Herzegovina fully into the digital broadcasting age, a full decade after the original deadline.

=== Physical decay and obsolete infrastructure ===
The financial crisis is visibly etched into the very fabric of the Broadcasting House, known as the "Grey House" (bos. Sivi dom). A 2016 report described a state of advanced decay, with the building's interior and its equipment reflecting decades of underinvestment. Much of the technical apparatus in use dates back to the 1984 Sarajevo Winter Olympics, with staff forced to creatively combine and repair obsolete analog equipment to produce a modern broadcast signal.

Employees refer to the old equipment as "museum pieces," noting that while TVSA was once a regional leader in TV production, it had fallen "below everyone" due to a complete lack of funds for modernization. Report vehicles purchased for the Olympics stand idle or are cannibalized for parts, with crews often having to move cameras between the studio and the vehicles to function. Large sections of the 30,000-square-meter building remain unfinished and unused since its original construction, with UNHCR foil still on the windows and visible scars from the war. Despite the conditions, staff maintained a sense of dedication, with one technician stating, "A little enthusiasm and desire still keeps us going. We don't ask if the salary was paid or when it will be, we just work."

=== Cascading systemic collapse ===
The financial crisis extends beyond the broadcaster's survival, posing a direct and immediate threat to Bosnia and Herzegovina's fundamental telecommunication infrastructure. BHRT is legally mandated to maintain the country's network of transmission repeaters.

The most critical of these is Hum Tower, on Mount Hum in Sarajevo. Heavily damaged during the war and now operating with obsolete equipment over 30 years old, the tower is the linchpin of the national broadcast system. The facility also houses equipment from critical state agencies, including the Border Service, the Agency for Identification Documents, and private internet providers.

In 2024, BHRT management issued a grave warning that "the survival of the Hum repeater is in question" due to a catastrophic lack of funds for essential maintenance and renovations. The station's manager emphasized that any failure at Hum would lead to a nationwide broadcast blackout, warning that "the entire BiH would be left without a signal."

The collapse of BHRT would trigger a chain reaction, crippling other broadcasters and vital state services. The broadcaster's management has warned that Federal Television (FTV) and Canton Television Sarajevo are logistically dependent on BHRT and would also be forced off the air.

Beyond broadcasting, a shutdown would disable the critical infrastructure hosted within BHRT's facilities. This elevates the crisis from an institutional failure to a direct threat to national security, public administration, and basic communications.

=== European Union's stance ===
The crisis at BHRT has drawn significant concern from the international community, particularly the European Union, which has framed its survival as a test of Bosnia and Herzegovina's democratic credentials. In November 2025, Luigi Soreca, the head of the EU Delegation and EU Special Representative in BiH, stated that the country "which aspires to EU membership cannot be the only one in Europe without a state public service." He described the situation as an existential threat caused by political irresponsibility and a conscious neglect of legal obligations by institutions and political leaders.

Soreca emphasized that the political independence and financial sustainability of public broadcasters are not a mere formality but a "fundamental condition for the functioning of a democratic state" and a clear priority on Bosnia's European path. He called on domestic authorities to immediately address the most urgent issues, including the debt to the EBU, and to undertake systemic reforms to ensure the long-term financial sustainability of the entire public broadcasting system, stating that "the preservation of BHRT is a test of political maturity."

=== Symbolic of the state's survival ===
Analysts and public figures have framed this multifaceted crisis not as a series of unfortunate events, but as a deliberate political strategy to dismantle state-level institutions. Prominent film director Dino Mustafić, who began his career at BHRT, argued that the collapse is a conscious act, writing: "The shutdown of BHRT is not a technical issue. It is a blow to the collective memory, to the citizens' right to know, to the very idea that the state exists as a common project." He and others have placed direct responsibility on the Presidency of BiH, the Council of Ministers, the Ministry of Finance, and the Parliamentary Assembly for their refusal to act, while identifying the policies of the SNSD and HDZ BiH as fundamentally aimed at the "ethnicization of media" and the undermining of a shared public space. This perspective holds that the struggle for BHRT is symbolic of the larger struggle for the state itself, with Mustafić warning that allowing its failure would be an "unprecedented generational shame" and the achievement of a strategic goal for those who desire the final end of Bosnia and Herzegovina.

=== Possibility of shutting down ===
On 26 February 2026, BHT1 halted all programming and replaced it with the following message:

Today, BHRT is not airing its regular programming.

This is a warning about the consequences and the absence of a systemic solution and the possible permanent shutdown of your public service.

Without an urgent decision from the competent authorities, BHRT faces the blocking of its account and the cessation of its basic function of public service in the interest of its citizens.

News bulletins will be aired as part of the schedule.

If the closure happens, Bosnia and Herzegovina will become the first country in Europe to lack a public broadcasting system.

== Cultural heritage and archives ==
Beyond its broadcasting role, BHRT serves as the guardian of a vast audiovisual archive that constitutes a significant part of Bosnia and Herzegovina's 20th and 21st-century cultural memory. The Archives Centre, housed within the Broadcasting House, holds the complete production fund from the Yugoslav to the modern era. The centre also holds the archive of RTVFBiH.

The oldest video material is the documentary "Oj Kozaro" by Jan Beran from 1961, and the oldest archived program is "Bura na mirnoj vodi" from 1963. The audio archive contains treasures such as the 1954 humoreska by Mirko Janjičić and radio plays for children like "Na djedovoj farmi" from 1975. The print archive includes clippings from newspapers like Oslobođenje dating back to 1948. This material is extensively used by journalists, academics, and filmmakers, both domestic and international, often for documentaries and commemorative programming.

However, this priceless heritage is under threat. A significant challenge is the analog nature of the majority of the collection. Amela Katana, the head of the Archives Centre with over 30 years of service, identified the urgent need for digitization as a primary concern. She noted that a portion of the material, particularly from 1986 to 1992 recorded on U-matic format, is currently inaccessible because the playback equipment is obsolete and nearly impossible to repair. This technical decay, compounded by the broadcaster's financial crisis, puts the long-term preservation of this "identity, cultural heritage, and historical memories" at severe risk. The work of the 11 dedicated archivists is a race against time and institutional neglect to save a national treasure.

== See also ==
- Radio-Television of the Federation of Bosnia and Herzegovina (RTVFBiH)
- Radio-Television of Republika Srpska (RTRS)
- European Broadcasting Union (EBU)
- Office of the High Representative (OHR)
- Media of Bosnia and Herzegovina
