= Amir Zukić =

Amir Zukić may refer to:

- Amir Zukić (politician)
- Amir Zukić (TV host)
