= Radio Herceg-Bosne =

- Mostar; Bosnia and Herzegovina
- Broadcast area: Bosnia and Herzegovina
- Branding: Public

Programming
- Language: Croatian
- Format: Variety
- Affiliations: TV Herceg-Bosne

Ownership
- Owner: RTVHB
- Sister stations: Mostarska panorama

History
- First air date: 1 May 1993
- Call sign meaning: RADIO HB

Technical information
- Transmitter coordinates: 43°20′N 17°48′E

Links
- Website: www.rtv-hb.com

Radio Herceg-Bosne is a public radio station, broadcasting from city of Mostar.

Radio Herceg-Bosne began broadcasting on 1 May 1993 and it was formatted as Variety radio station with music, news and talk shows in Croatian.

== Frequencies ==
The program is currently broadcast on 10 frequencies:

- Mostar 107.5 MHz
- Herzegovina and Dalmatia 103.9 MHz
- Sarajevo and central Bosnia 98.1 MHz
- Posavina and Slavonia 106.0 MHz
- Neum 107.3 MHz
- Gornji Vakuf-Uskoplje 91.4 MHz
- Stolac 103.6 MHz
- Konjic and Jablanica 101.1 MHz
- Prozor-Rama and Konjic 95.4 MHz
- Jajce 103.5 MHz

== See also ==
- List of radio stations in Bosnia and Herzegovina
- RTVHB
- Federalni Radio
