= Mirsad Abdagić Kike =

Bosnian television host and actor

Mirsad Abdagić (born 1958 in Sarajevo), also known as Kike Budalike, is a Bosnian television host and actor. He was nominated by the National and University Library of Bosnia and Herzegovina for the most significant award for children's literature.

== Biography ==
Musician, radio and TV host, children's poet, trash artist, and the first honorary ambassador of the "Little Ambassadors of Peace" (International League of Humanists, 2002). Author of numerous radio and TV shows and multimedia projects intended for children. He is the recipient of several important awards for best radio and TV host, athlete, and humanitarian, as well as for the promotion of music for children and youth. In 2016 the National and University Library of Bosnia and Herzegovina nominated Abdagić for the most significant award for children's literature.

=== TV shows and series ===
- Frenderi u Evropi (2009, puppet series for children, Marletti production, BHT1)
- Šta ste danas uradili? (2007, role of Barimba, puppet series for children, Marletti production)
- Barimba (2008, puppet children’s series, Marletti production, FTV)
- Kike Tike Tačke (1999–2021, TV show for children, FTV, TVSA, TV Alfa)
- Mali šlager (2002, host, FTV production; Little Schlager)
- Mali šlager (2005, role of Barimba, FTV production; Little Schlager)
- Avanture kapetana Barimbe (2014, puppet TV show for children, FTV; Adventures of Captain Barimba)
- Frenderi: Okoliš je sve (2011, puppet TV series for children, Marletti production, BHT1; Frenderi: Environment Is Everything)
- BHT Slagalica (2009, TV show for children, BHT1; BHT Puzzle)
- Frenderi u saobraćaju (2016, role of Vidalo, TVSA; Frenderi in Traffic)
- Frenderi u Bosni i Hercegovini (2015, role of Vidalo, BHT1; Frenderi in Bosnia and Herzegovina)
- Djeca vole (2015, TV show for children, Marletti production; Children Love)

=== Song albums ===
- Na putu oko svijeta (On the Road Around the World)
- Medo Medi Meda Ne Da (Teddy Medi Won’t Give Up)
- Kike u zemlji čudesa (2004; Kike in Wonderland)
- Kike i Krezubica (Kike and the Toothless Girl)
- Kike u svijetu bajki (Kike in the World of Fairy Tales)
- Album za odrasle (Album for Adults)
- Kike i Micika (Kike and Micika)
- Barimba Band
- Kike i Špajz girls (Kike and Špajz Girls)
- Rock’n’Roll za djecu i odrasle (Rock’n’Roll for Children and Adults)
