= Klix.ba =

Bosnian news portal

Coordinates: 43°52′N 18°25′E

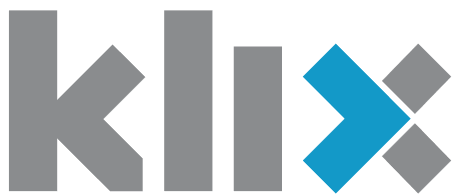
- Website type: Media
- Available in: Bosnian
- Owner: InterSoft d.o.o. Sarajevo
- Website: www.klix.ba
- Commercial: Yes
- Registration: Optional
- Launched: October 2000; 25 years ago
- Current status: active

Klix.ba is a Bosnian & Herzegovian web portal, the fourth most visited website in Bosnia and Herzegovina.

It was founded in 2000 as a forum, called Sarajevo-x, and changed its name to the current one in 2012. Every day it reports on information and news from Bosnia and Herzegovina and the world. The author and owner of the Internet portal Klix is the web development company InterSoft d.o.o. from Sarajevo.

Surprise financial and administrative inspections are used as a method to punish media outlets after critical reporting in Bosnia and Herzegovina. This was the case of the joint raid conducted on 29 December 2014 by the Federation of Bosnia and Herzegovina (FBiH) and Republika Srpska (RS) polices at the Sarajevo premises of the klix.ba website, after it had run a story about alleged corruption in the RS National Assembly. The police seized the website equipment and detained four journalists for questioning, whom they released after eight hours. They requested them to surrender the source of a wiretap in which RS Prime Minister Željka Cvijanović is caught saying to have bought two members of parliament to ensure a majority for her party in the Assembly. The raid had been preceded by a police hearing in Banja Luka, in which Klix.ba journalists had already been required to surrender their sources. According to the journalists, the raid was meant as an intimidation message to all journalists in the country.

On 10 March 2015 Klix.ba became the first media outlet from Bosnia and Herzegovina to have a verified Facebook page.

== See also ==
- Media of Bosnia and Herzegovina
