= Mostarska panorama =

Herzegovina radio station

Coordinates: 43°20′N 17°48′E

Mostar; Bosnia and Herzegovina
- Broadcast area: Herzegovina-Neretva Canton
- Frequency: Mostar 88.1 MHz
- Branding: Public

Programming
- Language: Croatian
- Format: Local news, talk and music

Ownership
- Owner: Hrvatski dom Herceg Stjepan Kosača Mostar; Podružnica "Mostarska panorama" Mostar

History
- First air date: August 14, 2018

Technical information
- Repeater: Mostar/Mikuljača

Links
- Webcast: On website
- Website: www.glasmostara.ba

Radio Mostarska panorama is a Herzegovina local public radio station, broadcasting from Mostar, Bosnia and Herzegovina.

From 2013 until 2018, Mostarska panorama was served as special daily output for Mostar operated by Radio Herceg-Bosne (from 07:00–10:00 hour) on their ceded frequency 107.5 MHz.

Since 14 August 2018, Mostarska panorama is separated radiostation (launched as part of a public institution Croatian Lodge "Herceg Stjepan Kosača" Mostar) which broadcasts on its own frequency (88.1 MHz).

Mostarska panorama broadcasts a variety of programs such as local news from Mostar area, talk shows, music and sport. Program is mainly produced in Croatian. Estimated number of potential listeners is around 95,173. The radio station is also available in municipalities of West Herzegovina.

== Frequencies ==
- Mostar 88.1 MHz

== See also ==
- List of radio stations in Bosnia and Herzegovina
