= Amir Zukić (TV host) =

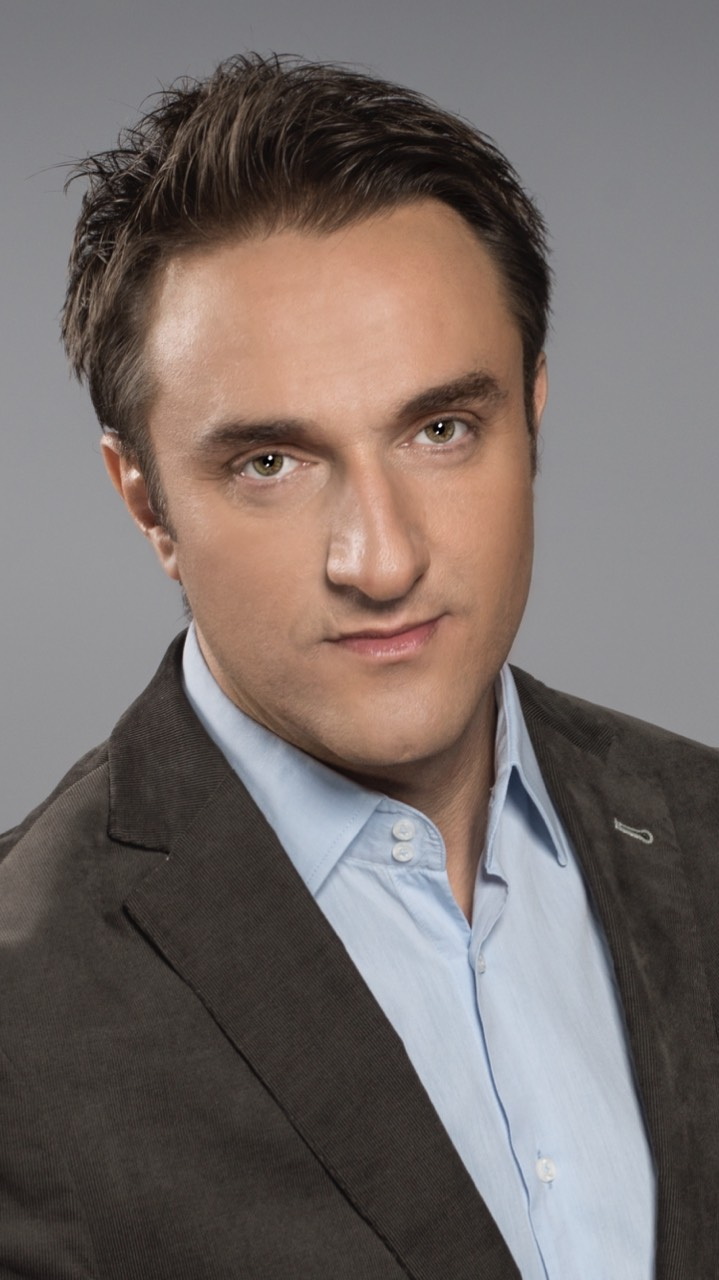
- Zukić in 2017
- Born: 12 October 1972 (age 53); Zvornik, SR Bosnia and Herzegovina, SFR Yugoslavia
- Education: MBA, Torino University-Scuola di Amministracione, M.Sc. in Economics, Sarajevo University-School of Business and Economy, BA in journalism, Sarajevo University-Faculty of political science
- Occupations: Television host and media manager
- Years active: 1995–present
- Employer: N1

Amir Zukić (born 12 October 1972) is a Bosnian television host and media manager. He is program and news director of N1 (TV channel) (CNN exclusive news channel affiliate for Adria region) in Bosnia and Herzegovina, based in Sarajevo. He anchors hard-talk show Pressing. He formerly hosted popular TV political shows Public Secret (BHT1) and Radio Free Europe/Radio Liberty TV. He previously served as a news director of Public Broadcasting Service of BiH (BHT1), programme director of TVSA and editor-in-chief of Anadolu Agency (Balkans service).

== Biography ==
Amir Zukić started down the path of professional reporting in wartime Sarajevo when he began working for BH Radio. At the end of 1995, he transferred to BiH Television where he spent three years as a reporter and host. After working in television, he spent six years with Radio Free Europe (RFE) as a reporter, editor and news programme host, and in parallel with working on the radio, he was the editor and hosted the “TV Liberty” programme. He worked as an RFE correspondent from Sarajevo and at the headquarters in Prague. At that time, he also published articles in the BH Dani weekly and well-known international magazines.

He then took up the position of editor-in-chief for the BiH Public Broadcasting Service (BHT1) news programme. He led a team of about a hundred reporters and editors from around the country, and was also the editor and host of the political programme "Public Secret" that stood out in the media landscape for its serious investigative stories and open conversations. Exposed to pressures from political leaders and interest groups over topics he tackled in "Public Secret", without protection or support from BHT1 management, Zukić went on the programme to say: "Goodbye to public service broadcasting. Welcome to state-owned, regime television." After managing the public broadcasting service for three years, Zukić was deposed and "Public Secret" pulled off the air.

After BHT1, he went to Sarajevo Television (TVSA) where he was programme director for four years. Before coming to N1, he worked for two years as the editor-in-chief of the Balkan branch of the Anadolu Agency.

As of February 2014, he has been at the helm of N1 Television in BiH where he is the programme director and news director, as well as the editor and host of the hard-talk show "Pressing".

== Education ==
He received his BA in Journalism from the Faculty of Political Science in Sarajevo. He completed master's studies in economics at the Universities of Turin and Sarajevo. He graduated with a Master of Business Administration (MBA) degree from the University of Turin and a Master of Science in Economics degree from the University of Sarajevo.

== Awards ==
Zukić was named TV Reporter of the Year in 2016 by the Journalists Association of BiH. For three years running (from 2015 to 2017), he has received special recognition as the best media manager in BiH from the European Management Association.

== See also ==
- Radio and Television of Bosnia and Herzegovina
- Televizija Sarajevo
