= Access to public information in Bosnia and Herzegovina =

Access to public information and freedom of information (FOI) refer to the right to access information held by public bodies also known as "right to know". Access to public information is considered of fundamental importance for the effective functioning of democratic systems, as it enhances governments' and public officials' accountability, boosting people participation and allowing their informed participation into public life. The fundamental premise of the right to access public information is that the information held by governmental institutions is in principle public and may be concealed only on the basis of legitimate reasons which should be detailed in the law.

Bosnia and Herzegovina was one of the first countries in the Balkans to adopt the Freedom of Access to Information Act, at the State level in 2000, and then in 2001 in both of its entities, namely the Federation of Bosnia and Herzegovina and the Republika Srpska. However, according to some experts the law requires changes to address a series of shortcomings that have been identified over the years.

== Background ==
Due to the specific circumstances and the way in which it was created, the Constitution of Bosnia and Herzegovina, annex IV of Dayton Peace Agreement did not pay much attention to the right to information. The development of freedom of information legislation was initiated with a decision of the High Representative in 1999. The Decision asked the State and the Entities to adopt such a legislation. The consultation process for drafting the law involved the Organisation for Security and Cooperation in Europe (OSCE)’s legal experts and extensive public discussions with citizens and civil society groups. The Act was adopted by the Bosnia and Herzegovina State Government in October 2000, and the Republika Srpska Government in May 2001.

== Legal framework ==
The laws establish a general right of the public to access the information held by public authorities/organs “to the greatest extent possible consistent with the public interest”. Therefore, the laws establish a general obligation of making all relevant information public, except for some cases falling under the exceptions defined by the law. Access to public information applies to information held by all public organs (legislative, judiciary, executive and administrative) and regardless of their format (written documents, digital data, audio or video records, etc.) as well as to legal persons owner or controlled by public bodies, such as public enterprises, public schools, universities, state agencies, etc. On the contrary, it does not apply to private organisations, private companies and the commercial sector. The laws entitle every person, regardless of his or her citizenship, nationality, ethnicity, or place of residence, the right to access to public information. Journalists and media outlet do not have more rights compared with other requesters. The prescribed period of time for obtaining the requested information is 15 days from the submission of the request. Under the FOI laws, public authorities are both obliged to provide access to documents and records and to publish the most important information without a request (proactive disclosure). Rules for proactive publication apply to information on institutions’ budget, regular activities and decision-making.

=== Exceptions ===
In line with international standards, access to information laws in the Federation of Bosnia and Herzegovina and in Republika Srpska establish that in some cases public information can be withheld on a legal basis. Specifically, three cases of exceptions are foreseen: first, when there is the possibility that disclosing information can cause a significant damage to legitimate functions of the government (national security, defence, monetary policy issues, prevention of crime, etc.); second, the exceptions can be applied to protect commercial interests; and, third, to protect personal interests and privacy of a third party. The application of these exceptions is not automatic: in effect, in order to reject the application on the basis of the exceptions established in the law, authorities have to make the public interest test, meaning considering whether and how the disclosure of information is harming other protected interests. The public interest test is inspired by the most advanced international standards on the right of access to public information. Compared with similar laws in the Western Balkans, only the laws of Serbia and Croatia prescribe such a test. Exceptions are applied only after a case-by-case analysis of every case and specific circumstances related to each request. Labeling a whole category of information as exemption is forbidden.

== Access to public information in practice ==
In Bosnia and Herzegovina some NGOs contribute to enforce the law on access to public information as well as to monitor its application and collect relevant data through the submission of FOI requests and the start of appeal procedures. This is the case, for instance, of the Balkan Investigative Reporting Network (BIRN), Transparency International (Bosnia and Herzegovina), or the Sarajevo-based Center for Investigative Journalism (CIN).

According to a report prepared by the Association of journalists of Bosnia and Herzegovina and the country's Press Council, the vast majority of Bosnians (around 93%) believe that there are several limitations to the right of access to public information in practice. At the same, public opinion in Bosnia and Herzegovina is largely not fully aware of their rights with regard to access to public information.

When it comes to the application of the law, problems range from inconsistent interpretation of the law by different public bodies, unwillingness to apply it, to non-harmonisation of FOI laws with other laws.

Specifically, one of the major deficiency of freedom of information laws in Bosnia and Herzegovina is the weakness of the provisions concerning the appeal procedures in case the request is rejected. The FOI law of the Republika Srpska does not stipulate an appeal procedure at all. Another problem concerns the lack of compliance with other existing laws that exclude or significantly reduce the right to free access to information in practice both in the Federation and in the Republika Srpska. Also, experts have identified among the shortcomings hindering the application of FOI laws in Bosnia and Herzegovina the lack of an effective system for monitoring their application. Only a small number of public bodies comply with the obligation to publish the information on the number of received questions related to freedom of information on a regular basis.

In 2013-16 in order to test the implementation of FOI laws, the Balkan Investigative Reporting Network (BIRN) submitted a series of requests for accessing documents to different public bodies in the country at all level. Half of BIRN's requests for information were rejected, while the remaining 50 per cent were only partially granted.

Also, according to Transparency International - Bosnia and Herzegovina only 40% of public enterprises in Republika Srpska and 27% in the Federation of Bosnia and Herzegovina provides the requested information within the timeframe established by the law. In 37% of cases examined by Transparency International the fulfillment of the procedure lasts more than one month, even if the law stipulates that the information requested must be provided in maximum 15 days.

== See also ==
- Access to public information in Europe
- Freedom of information
- Freedom of information laws by country
- List of libraries in Bosnia and Herzegovina
- Transparency of media ownership in Europe
- Media of Bosnia and Herzegovina
- Transparency of media ownership in Bosnia and Herzegovina
