= Hrvatski glasnik (Tuzla) =

Croatian magazine

Hrvatski glasnik Croatian Messenger
- Type: magazine
- Founder: fra Petar Matanović
- Publisher: HKD Napredak
- Editor-in-chief: Maja Nikolić
- Founded: December 1992
- Political alignment: Croats of Bosnia and Herzegovina
- Language: Croatian
- Headquarters: Tuzla, Bosnia and Herzegovina
- City: Tuzla
- Country: Bosnia and Herzegovina
- Sister newspapers: Dnevni list

Hrvatski glasnik (lit. "Croatian Messenger") is monthly magazine published by HKD Napredak in Tuzla, Bosnia and Herzegovina. The magazine is published in Croatian and is popular among the Croats of northeast Bosnia.

It was founded in December 1992 by franciscan fra Petro Matanović as the first Croatian magazine after the fall of communism. Dnevni list from Mostar is a sister newspaper.

The magazine promotes Croatian culture, folklore, literature, sport and music. It also writes about the news in the Catholic Church of Bosnia and Herzegovina.

Chief editor of the magazine is Maja Nikolić, who succeeded after Juraj Novosel, university professor and historian.
