= Sarajevo's Ozren =

Mountain in Bosnia and Herzegovina

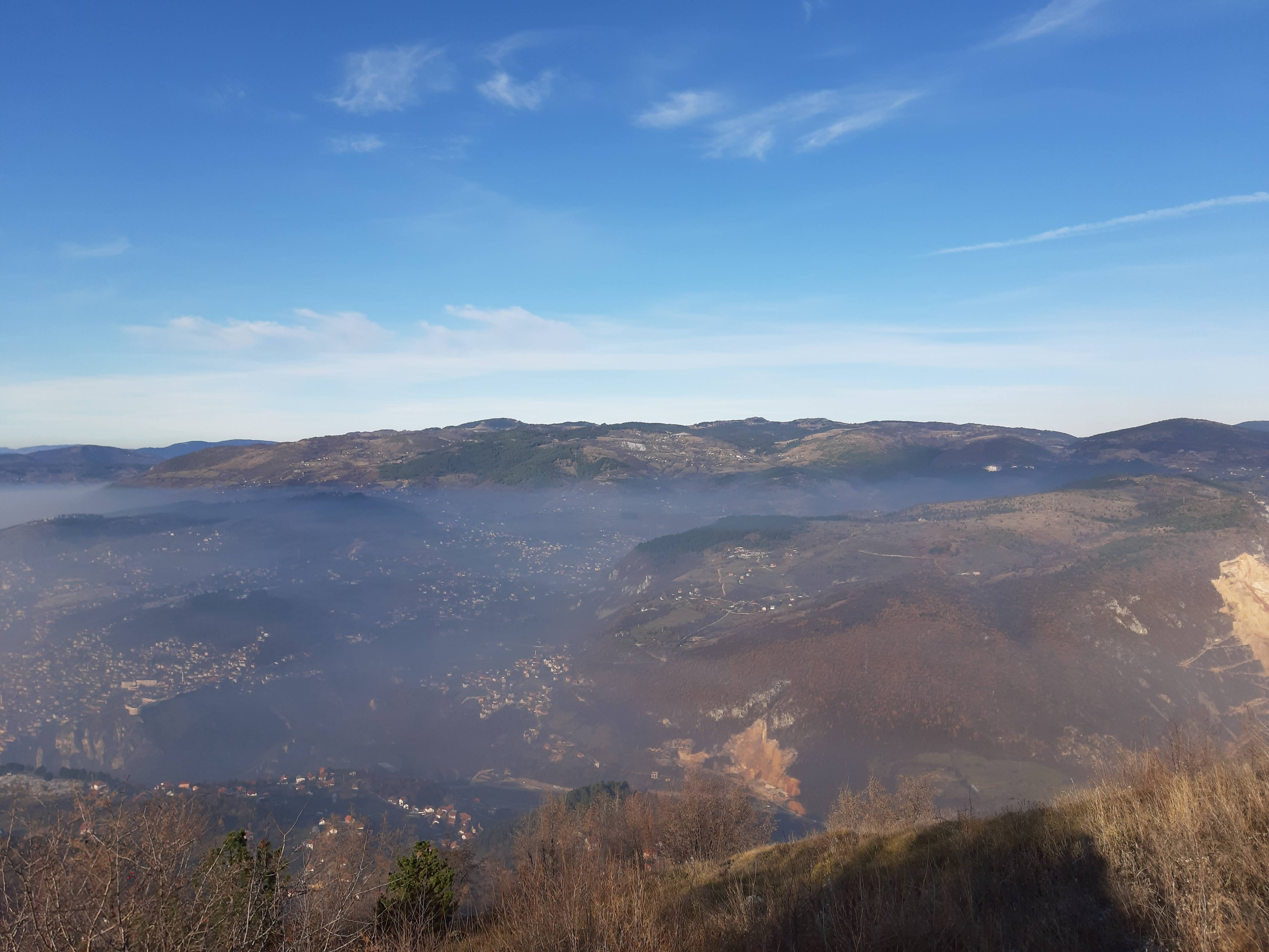
- View of Sarajevo's Ozren from Trebević

Highest point
- Coordinates: 43°56′01″N 18°27′02″E

Naming
- Native name: Sarajevski Ozren (BCMS)

Geography
- Location within Bosnia and Herzegovina
- Location: Bosnia and Herzegovina

Sarajevo's Ozren is complex of mountains and hilly plateaus located northeast of Sarajevo. This entire area is covered by a number of different paths and hiking trails, and it has popular picnic areas (Barice, Čavljak, Pjeskovita Ravan), popular for people from Sarajevo.

== Geography ==
Sarajevo's Ozren consists of several main parts:

- Ozren-mountain (Ozren in the narrow sense), includes Motka, Visojevica, area Ozren-Bandijera
- Plateau Crepoljsko, includes area of Crepoljsko, area Crni Vrh (near Vučija Luka) and southeast ridges over Miljacka
- Mountain ridge Bukovik, includes main ridge Bukovik and Nahorevo hills - Bijelosava
- Hill Hum (in Sarajevo)

Highest peak of Sarajevo's Ozren is Bukovik (1,534 m), and second highest is Crepoljsko (1,524 m).

Skakavac waterfall, a declared natural monument is also located in Sarajevo's Ozren.

== Mountain huts ==
In the 1935–1936 season, the mountain hut on Bukovik, at 1,482 metres (4,862 ft) in elevation, saw about 600 visitors. In the 1936–1937 season, it saw 1036 visitors, including 2 Austrian citizens. In the 1937–1938 season it saw 796 visitors, including 2 German citizens.

== Bibliography ==
- Guber, Mihovil (1943). "Pustošenje planinarskih objekata u južnoj Hrvatskoj" [The Desolation of Mountain Objects in Southern Croatia] (PDF). Hrvatski planinar (in Croatian). Vol. 39, no. 6–7. pp. 85–93. ISSN 0354-0650.
