= Mario Drmać =

Bosnian actor (born 1977)

- Born: March 25, 1977 (age 49); Mostar, SR Bosnia and Herzegovina, SFR Yugoslavia
- Education: Academy of Performing Arts in Sarajevo
- Occupations: Actor, TV host
- Years active: 1992–present

Mario Drmać (born 25 March 1977) is a Bosnian actor and television host.

== Biography ==
Mario Drmać was born on 25 March 1977 in Mostar. During primary school (1984–1992), he was a member of the amateur theaters "Mostar Youth Theater" and "Crazy Theater." He enrolled in the Second Gymnasium in 1992/93 and graduated in 1996.

From 1992 to 1997, he worked as a freelancer in the "Puppet Theater Mostar," performing in numerous plays, often in leading roles. During this period, he also collaborated with the Croatian National Theater in Mostar on the play "Tena" (directed by Bobo Jelčić) and worked as a children's TV editor at Croatian Radio Mostar for a year and a half.

In 1997, Drmać moved to Sarajevo and enrolled in the Academy of Performing Arts in Sarajevo in the Acting Department, studying under professor Admir Glamočak. While at the academy, he performed in numerous student productions. He graduated in 2001 with collective production "Demoni" (Laš Nuren) and a solo project "Ludilo u dvoje" (Jonesko).

He has worked as an actor at Pozorište mladih Sarajevo and as a senior assistant at the Academy of Performing Arts in puppetry. From 11 September 2015 to 16 May 2016, he served as the acting director of the theater.

In 2022, he completed a master's degree in puppetry directing at the Academy of Arts and Culture in Osijek.

== Theater Work ==
=== Student and early productions ===
- "Dame biraju" – 2nd-year exam performance
- "Buba u uhu" – role: Butler Etjen; 3rd-year exam performance
- "Shopping and Fucking" – production Mess, dir. Tanja Miletić-Oručević
- "Trainspotting" – production Toto, dir. Dragan Marinković

=== Pozorište mladih Sarajevo ===
- "Košmar o Bosni" – dir. Faruk Lončarević
- "Nema dima bez vatre" – dir. Drago Buka
- "Kako je mačak naučio galebicu da leti" – dir. Kaća Dorić
- "Carev Vodonoša i car Bumbar" – dir. Kaća Dorić
- "Buba u uhu" – dir. Sulejman Kupusović
- "Trg ratnika" – dir. Dino Mustafić

=== Other theaters ===
- Bosnian National Theatre Zenica: "Govorna mana" – role: Petar, dir. Marko Misirača
- Kamerni teatar 55: "Oluja" – dir. Faruk Lončarević
- National Theatre Sarajevo: "Hamlet" – role: Hamlet, dir. Dubravko Bibanović
- Various other productions across theaters in Bosnia and Herzegovina

== Film and Television ==
- "Remake" – role: singer Remzo, dir. Dino Mustafić
- "Go West" – main role: Kenan, dir. Ahmed Imamović
- "Nafaka" – role: Nicolo, dir. Jasmin Duraković
- "Ritam života" – role: Nedim, dir. Enver Puška
- "Slunjska brda, život ili smrt" – role: twin brothers, dir. Sedin Mehadžić

He has also appeared in multiple TV series and children's shows, including hosting roles.

== Awards ==
- SIMPA Personality Award 2001, Radio M listeners & Jutarnje Novine readers
- Best school performance: "Dame biraju," Academy of Performing Arts, 1999–2000
- Mostarska Liska award for acting in "Buba u uhu," 2004
- Best young actor for "Trg ratnika," Jajce Theater Festival, 2005
- Best actor awards for various performances at regional and international festivals
- 2023: Best acting and animation for "Tobija" at the 56th International Puppet Theater Festival, Zagreb
