= Naša ognjišta =

Bosnian-Croat, Catholic newspaper

- Type: Weekly newspaper
- Format: 23.5×33 cm
- Publisher: Roman Catholic Diocese of Mostar-Duvno
- Editor-in-chief: Robert Jolić
- Language: Croatian
- City: Tomislavgrad
- Country: Bosnia and Herzegovina
- Circulation: 15 000 (as of 2014)
- Website: samostan-tomislavgrad.info

Naša ognjišta (lit. 'Our Fireplaces' in Croatian) is a Bosnian-Croat, Catholic weekly newspaper published by the Franciscan province of the Roman Catholic Diocese of Mostar-Duvno in Herzegovina as well as publisher.

The newspaper is also distributed among the Croatian diaspora worldwide. The newspaper is printed in Franjo Kluz Printing House in Omiš, Croatia.

== History ==
The first issue was published at July 20, 1971, on 12 pages, as the first Catholic periodical in Bosnia and Herzegovina following the ending of the Second World War.

First issue had a circulation of 5,000, second of 6,000 and third of 12,000 copies. Local communist authorities proclaimed the newspaper as the "enemy propaganda" and both Fr. Ferdo Vlašić (first editor) and Fr. Jozo Križić (secretary) were imprisoned. Due to state censorship, from May 1982 to 1990 newspaper was published under the name Sveta baština ("Holy Heritage").

In 1988-9, circulation reached 25,000 copies. The newspaper was not published during the War in Bosnia and Herzegovina but was renewed following its ending in 1995.

In 2011, circulation was around 15,000 copies. 500th issue was published in June 2023.

== Editors ==
- Fr. Ferdo Vlašić (July 1971–January 1982, July/August 1995)
- Fr. Marinko Leko (March 1982–October 1988)
- Fr. Viktor Nuić (November 1988–August 1989)
- Fr. Gabrijel Mioč (September 1995–August 2005)
- Fr. Robert Jolić (September 2005– )

Few issue were edited by the Editorial Committee (Uredničko vijeće).

== Contributors ==
Notable contributors include Jozo Mašić, Ante Matić, Nenad Mirko Novaković, Fabijan Lovrić, Bazilije Pandžić etc.

== Bibliography ==
- Robert Jolić, ed. (2022). Pedeset godina Naših ognjišta (1971.-2021.) [Fifty years of Naša ognjišta (1971-2021)] (in Croatian). Tomislavgrad: Naša ognjišta. ISBN 978-9958-782-85-5.
