= MP BHRT =

Music Production of BHRT
- Native name: Muzička Produkcija BHRT; Музичка Продукција БХРТ
- Company type: Public
- Industry: Music & Entertainment
- Genre: Music & Entertainment
- Founded: 2004 (under this name)
- Founder: BHRT
- Headquarters: Sarajevo, Bosnia and Herzegovina
- Key people: Jasmin Ferović (head of the working unit MP BHRT)
- Products: Audio CD, DVD-Video
- Parent: BHRT
- Website: bhrt.ba

Music Production of BHRT [MP BHRT; Bosnian: Muzička Produkcija BHRT (MP BHRT) / Музичка Продукција БХРТ (МП БХРТ)] records and edits a significant portion of radio and television programme which is intended to promote culture, music and especially traditional music from Bosnia and Herzegovina. Music Production is one of three organizational units in BHRT (together with national public television channel BHT 1 and public radio service BH Radio 1).

== Music production and orchestra of BHRT ==
Music Production orchestra participates in public happenings, radio and television shows in Bosnia and Herzegovina, enriching the music archive with new recordings, and edits – digitalised old recordings. Currently it has three orchestra:

- Narodni orkestar (The Folk orchestra) – The forerunner of today's orchestra of folk music there were a few freelance ensembles who worked at Radio Sarajevo since 1947.
- Tamburaški orkestar – The Tamburitza orchestra was founded in 1945. as a permanent music publishing authority that besides recording traditional music took part in the public and cultural life of Bosnia and Herzegovina.
- Zabavni orkestar – This orchestra usually performs and produces pop and jazz music, as well as projects such as the participation of Bosnia and Herzegovina in the Eurovision Song Contest.

== Music archives of BHRT ==
Music Production of BHRT also has a rich musical archive that dates back to 1946. The main duty of the Music Archives of BHRT through several decades of collecting works was preserved – to keep and protect the authentic sound material, which will be put to use by generations to come, as well as to express the need for preserving the rich musical heritage.

Today the archives of BHRT hold around 50,550 records. For the most part those are magnetic tape recordings (28,050), 18,500 LP records, and about 4,000 compact discs. Especially important is the compilation of folklore, and intention to preserve and affirm sevdah as a unique traditional expression in Bosnia and Herzegovina. In this extremely rich archive of different genres, as well as traditional and world music pieces, there are many rare recordings.

Recordings from the Archives are primarily used in BHRT radio and television programmes. Through digitalisation and creation of a unique database and networking with radio and television programmes, BHRT will accomplish one of their main goals – to offer a simpler and faster access to their content. Digitalization of MGT tapes is well under way. The archives, as well as the cultural and national heritage, is invaluable. This is especially significant when taken into consideration that most of the magnetic tape recordings are work of the Music Production of BHRT.

== See also ==
- Music of Bosnia and Herzegovina
- BHRT
- BHT 1
- BH Radio 1
