= Mount Hum (Sarajevo) =

Hill in Sarajevo, Bosnia and Herzegovina

Hum
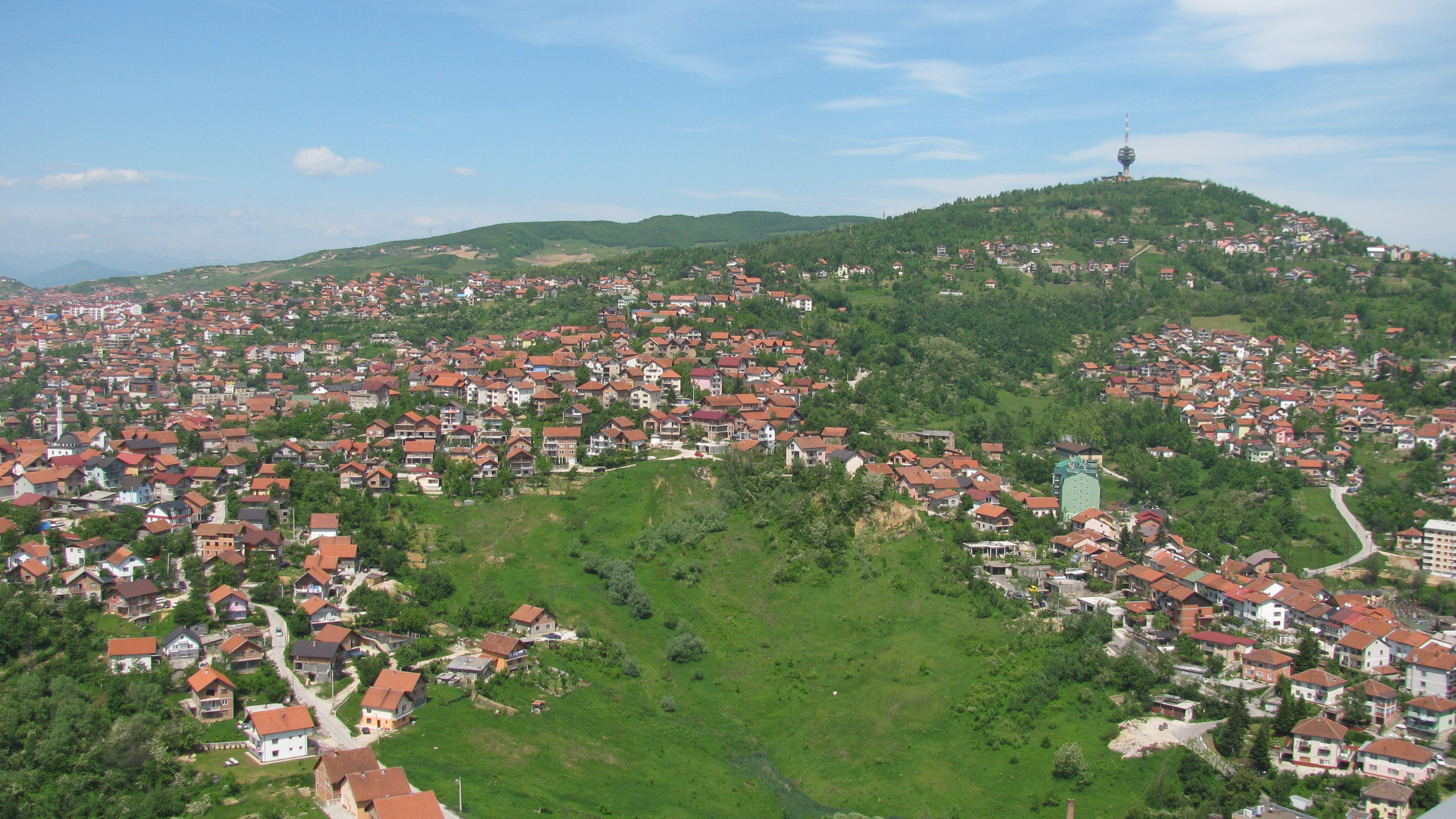

Highest point
- Elevation: 816 m (2,677 ft)
- Coordinates: 43°52′21″N 18°22′39″E

Geography
- Location within Bosnia and Herzegovina
- Location: Bosnia and Herzegovina
- Parent range: Dinaric Alps

Hum, also referred to as Hum Brdo (lit. "Hum Hill"), is a small mountain located north of Sarajevo, Bosnia and Herzegovina. At its top is the Hum Tower. In wider terms, Hum hill is considered as part of Sarajevo's Ozren.

Most of the area has been designated as a park and recreational zone called Park Šuma Hum, and a number of sports and recreational facilities are planned for the near future. The very top of Hum offers views of Sarajevo, as well as the mountains Trebević, Igman and Bjelašnica.
