= Novi reporter =

News magazine in Bosnia and Herzegovina

- Categories: News magazine Political magazine
- Frequency: Weekly
- Founder: Igor Gaic
- First issue: 1 March 2003; 23 years ago - 2014
- Company: OG Press
- Country: Bosnia and Herzegovina
- Based in: Banja Luka

Novi reporter (Bosnian pronunciation: [nôʋiː repǒrteːr]; New reporter) is a weekly news magazine based in Banja Luka, Bosnia and Herzegovina.

== History and profile ==
Novi reporter was first published in March 2003. The founders of the magazine were a group of journalists who previously worked for the Banja Luka edition of now-defunct Reporter magazine which they left the magazine in February 2003. They were led by Igor Gajic and established a company, the OG Press, which is the owner of Novi reporter.

The headquarters of Novi reporter is in Banja Luka, and it is published weekly.

Its content focuses on news and popular culture. Igor Gaic also edits the magazine. Novi reporter has an independent stance, but supports the full independence of the Republika Srpska. OG Press closed in 2014 due to bankruptcy.
