= Seid Zukić =

Bosnian footballer

Personal information
- Date of birth: 9 April 1994 (age 32)
- Place of birth: Jablanica, Bosnia and Herzegovina
- Height: 1.98 m (6 ft 6 in)
- Position: Forward

Senior career*
Years	Team	Apps	(Gls)
2016	Čapljina	15	(3)
2016–2017	Orašje	14	(6)
2017	Travnik	14	(6)
2017–2018	Vitez	18	(4)
2018–2019	Tours II	7	(1)
2018–2019	Tours	2	(1)
2018–2019	→ Sloboda Tuzla (loan)	26	(1)
2019–2021	Radnik Bijeljina	25	(1)
- * Club domestic league appearances and goals as of 12 December 2020

Seid Zukić (born 9 April 1994) is a Bosnian professional footballer who plays as a forward.

== Professional career ==
Zukić scored 6 goals in 14 appearances for Orašje, and moved to Travnik in the second division of Bosnia. On 12 January 2018, Tours FC signed Zukić from the Bosnian club NK Vitez. Zukić made his professional debut with Tours in a 1-0 Ligue 2 loss to Stade de Reims on 16 January 2018.
