= Radio Republike Srpske =

Bosnian public radio station

- Bosnia and Herzegovina
- Broadcast area: Republika Srpska; Bosnia and Herzegovina

Programming
- Language: Serbian
- Affiliations: RTRS

Ownership
- Owner: RTRS

History
- First air date: 2 February 1967 (as Radio Banja Luka); 1993 (as Radio RS)
- Call sign meaning: RTRS-RRS

Technical information
- Transmitter coordinates: 44°46′N 17°11′E

Links
- Website: www.rtrs.tv

Radio Republike Srpske or Radio RS is the entity-level public radio channel operated by Radio Televizija Republike Srpske (RTRS). Its headquarters are located in Banja Luka.

The radio station broadcasts a variety of programmes, including news, music, talk shows and sports. Its programming is broadcast 24 hours per day in the Serbian language.

== See also ==
- List of radio stations in Bosnia and Herzegovina
- Radio Televizija Republike Srpske
- BH Radio 1
- Federalni Radio
