= Radiotelevizija Herceg-Bosne =

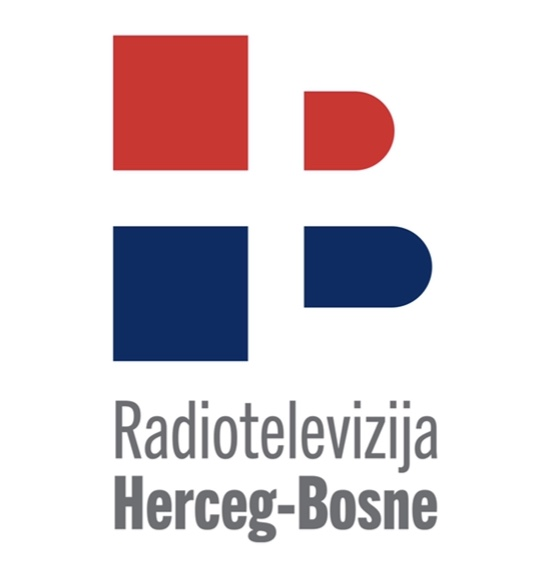
- Type: Broadcast radio, television and online
- Country: Bosnia and Herzegovina
- Headquarters: Mostar
- Broadcast area: Bosnia and Herzegovina
- Key people: Slavica Karačić (General Director)
- Established: 1992
- Launch date: 2019
- Radio station: Radio Herceg-Bosne
- Television Channel: Televizija Herceg-Bosne
- Callsigns: RTVHB
- Callsign meaning: Radiotelevizija Herceg-Bosne
- Official website: www.rtv-hb.com

Radiotelevizija Herceg-Bosne (English: Radiotelevision of Herzeg-Bosnia or RTVHB) is a Croat public-service broadcasting organization based in Mostar, Bosnia and Herzegovina. RTV Herceg-Bosne is a television station from Bosnia and Herzegovina in Croatian. The television was established back in 1992 with a constant radio program, and the television program began broadcasting only on July 1, 2019, after a series of acquisitions of several televisions. The headquarters of RTVHB are located in Mostar. Regional TV studios are located in the following cities: Kiseljak, Livno and Orašje.

As of July 2019 RTVHB consists of two organizational units:

- Radio Herceg-Bosne – public radio service
- Televizija Herceg-Bosne – public television channel

== History ==
Radiotelevision of Herzeg-Bosnia was founded in 1992 in Mostar. It took a long time for the television component to actually start broadcasting despite investments exceeding 10 million German marks. It began broadcasting in 1992 and is still active. In 1996, Erotel was founded and it was considered to be the successor of Television of Herzeg-Bosnia. It broadcast programs in Croatian until 1999, when its work was banned. Specifically, on 15 November 1999, the Communications Regulatory Agency of Bosnia and Herzegovina (RAK) banned Erotel and handed the transmitters serviced by Erotel over to Federalna TV.
