= Dnevni list =

- Type: Daily
- Owner: DL TRGOVINA d.o.o. Mostar
- Editor-in-chief: Dario Lukić
- Founded: 2001; 24 years ago
- Political alignment: Centre-right
- Language: Croatian
- Headquarters: Kralja Petra Krešimira IV 66/2 Mostar
- City: Mostar
- Country: Bosnia and Herzegovina
- Website: dnevni.ba

Dnevni list (Croatian pronunciation: [dnêːʋniː lîːst]) is the Bosnian daily newspaper based in Mostar. The paper is especially popular among the nation of the Croats. The paper has a pro-Croats stance.
