= BH Radio 1 =

Bosnian public radio station

- Bosnia and Herzegovina

Programming
- Languages: Bosnian, Croatian and Serbian
- Affiliations: BHT 1 and MP BHRT

Ownership
- Owner: BHRT

History
- First air date: 10 April 1945; 81 years ago

Links
- Website: www.bhrt.ba

BH Radio 1 is a Bosnian national public radio channel operated by Radio and Television of Bosnia and Herzegovina (BHRT).

The programme is broadcast daily, 24 hours a day, with content in the three official languages of Bosnia and Herzegovina: Bosnian, Croatian and Serbian. The radio station broadcasts a variety of programmes, including news, music, talk shows, radio drama, sports, magazine programmes and children's programming.

BH Radio 1 is one of three organizational units of BHRT, together with BHT 1, the national public television service, and music production.

== See also ==
- List of radio stations in Bosnia and Herzegovina
- MP BHRT
- BHT 1
