= Radio Televizija Republike Srpske =

Public broadcaster of Republika Srpska, Bosnia and Herzegovina

Radio Television of Republika Srpska
- Type: Broadcast radio, television and online
- Country: Bosnia and Herzegovina
- Headquarters: Banja Luka
- Broadcast area: Bosnia and Herzegovina; Republika Srpska; Serbia and Montenegro on cable
- Key people: Dijana Milanković (General Director); Dejan Dejanović (head of MP RTRS)
- Established: 1992
- Launch date: 1992
- Former names: Serbian radio-television (1992–1997)
- Radio station: Radio Republike Srpske
- Television Channel: Televizija Republike Srpske; RTRS PLUS
- Callsigns: РТРС (RTRS)
- Callsign meaning: Радио Телевизија Републике Српске
- Former callsigns: СРТ (SRT)
- Affiliation: BHRT
- Official website: rtrs.tv

Radio Television of Republika Srpska (Serbian: Радио Телевизија Републике Српске / Radio Televizija Republike Srpske or RTRS) is the entity-level public broadcaster which operates radio and television services in Republika Srpska, Bosnia and Herzegovina. It is the official public broadcasting service that covers government activities in the Republic of Srpska.

== Services ==
RTRS headquarters in Banja Luka (2021)

Founded in 1992, RTRS broadcasts a 24-hour television channel known as Televizija Republike Srpske, and one radio station called Radio Republike Srpske. There is also a unit known as Muzička Produkcija RTRS ("Music Production Section of RTRS", locally known as MP RTRS for short) which was established in 2011.

Headquarters of RTRS is located in Banja Luka. Regional radio and TV studios are located in the following cities: Prijedor, Istočno Sarajevo, Bijeljina, Trebinje, Doboj and Brčko.

Radio and television programming is mainly produced in the Serbian language (in one of two alphabets: Cyrillic and Latin alphabet. Since April 2013, RTRS stations are broadcast on Eutelsat 16A (Team:Sat platform).

As of January 2015 RTRS consists of three organizational units:

- Radio Republike Srpske – public radio service (Радио Републике Српске)
- Televizija Republike Srpske – public television channel (Телевизија Републике Српске)
- Muzička Produkcija RTRS – music production section of RTRS (Музичка Продукција РТРС)

On 19 April 2015, RTRS started to broadcast a second channel called RTRS PLUS.

== History ==
The first experimental programs of Radio Banja Luka were broadcast on 25 January 1967. Regular programming began on 2 February 1967.

In May 1992 Radio Banja Luka became the information-technical center for Bosnian Serb broadcasting, whose main office was in Pale.

In December 1994, Serbian radio-television (Српска радио-телевизија (СРТ) / Srpska radio-televizija (SRT)) was founded, and programs from Banja Luka TV and radio studios were broadcast on demand. RTRS has a permanent staff of 100 journalists, editors, cameramen, musical collaborators and organizers.

== See also ==
- List of radio stations in Bosnia and Herzegovina
- Televizija Republike Srpske
- RTVFBiH
- BHRT
- RTVHB
