= Federalna televizija =

- Country: Bosnia and Herzegovina
- Network: RTVFBiH
- Affiliates: Federalni Radio; Federalna.ba
- Headquarters: Sarajevo

Programming
- Languages: Bosnian; Croatian
- Picture format: 16:9 1080i (HDTV)

Ownership
- Owner: RTVFBiH
- Key people: Željko Tica (editor-in-chief)
- Sister channels: FTV 2 (2001–2003)

History
- Launched: 27 October 2001

Links
- Website: www.federalna.ba

Availability

Terrestrial
- Terrestrial signal: Across the territory of FBiH entity and BiH

Federalna televizija (also known as Televizion of the Federation of Bosnia and Herzegovina or FTV) is a public TV channel operated by RTVFBiH. The program is broadcast on a daily basis, 24 hours from RTVFBiH headquarters located in Sarajevo.

The radio and television program is mainly produced in Bosnian and Croatian. Television program initially aired on two television channels (FTV1 and FTV2). Since April 2003 the television program is reduced to one (just FTV). According to the most recent measurements viewership of television channels in 2012, FTV is most watched television station in Bosnia and Herzegovina with 14.4% share. This television channel broadcasts a variety of programs such as news, talk shows, documentaries, sports, movies, mosaic, children's programs, etc. FTV also broadcasts teletext services (Teletext FTV).

== Programming overview ==
Federalna televizija (FTV) offers a wide variety of content spanning news, talk shows, entertainment, documentaries, sports, and drama. Below is a categorized breakdown of FTV's key offerings:

=== News programs ===
- Dnevnik: Main news, sports, and weather aired daily at 12:00 (Dnevnik 1), 19:30 (Dnevnik 2), and approximately 23:00 (Dnevnik 3).
- Vijesti: Short news bulletins at 08:00, 10:00, and 14:15–14:45.
- Federacija Danas ("Federation Today"): Local and regional news from major cities in the Federation of Bosnia and Herzegovina (FBiH). Broadcast Monday to Friday at 17:00. Regional TV studios are located in Bihać, Mostar, Tuzla, Zenica, and Travnik.
- Paralele: A popular magazine covering global news and politics. Hosted by Mladen Marić until his death on November 16, 2019. The future of the show remains uncertain.

=== Talk shows ===
- Odgovorite ljudima ("Answer to the People"): A discussion show addressing societal issues in Bosnia and Herzegovina. Airs Wednesdays at 20:10.
- Dnevnik D: A short prime-time interview program with guests, broadcast Thursdays at 20:05.

=== Entertainment ===
- Jutarnji Program ("Morning Program"): A mosaic-style morning show produced collaboratively with BHRT.
- TV Bingo Show: National lottery program airing Fridays at 20:10.
- SuperLOTO: National lottery program aired Tuesdays at 19:10.
- LOTO 5/39: National lottery program aired Thursdays at 19:10.

=== Documentary programs ===
- Dokumentarni Četvrtak ("Documentary Thursday"): Features documentaries from Bosnia and Herzegovina and regional productions.
- Sedmica ("The Week"): Covers major cultural events, including film, theater, opera, and art exhibitions.
- Mozaik Religija ("Mosaic of Religions"): Explores religious themes in Bosnia and Herzegovina.
- Zelena Panorama ("Green Panorama"): A program focusing on agriculture.
- Ekovizija ("Eco Vision"): Dedicated to environmental issues.
- Prirodna Baština ("Natural Heritage"): Educational content on Bosnia and Herzegovina's geography.

=== Sports programs ===
- International Boxing Federation: Broadcasts matches involving Felix Sturm.
- UEFA Champions League: Tuesday matches in collaboration with BHRT and RTRS.
- UEFA Europa League: Broadcast in partnership with BHRT and RTRS.

=== Bosnian series produced by FTV ===
- Viza za Budućnost ("Visa for the Future"): A post-independence Bosnian sitcom that aired from 2002 to 2008.
- Lud, Zbunjen, Normalan ("The Crazy, the Confused, the Normal One"): A comedy series (2007–2013).
- Kriza ("Crisis"): A comedy series (2013–2014, with reruns in 2016).
- Lutkokaz: A children's TV series (2001–2007).

=== Formerly aired programs ===
- Peppa Pig, Oscar's Oasis, The Garfield Show, Masha and the Bear, and Oggy and the Cockroaches: Popular animated series.
- Turkish dramas such as Binbir Gece and Poyraz Karayel
- Reality shows such as Shopping Queen.
- Serbian dramas: Ranjeni Orao.
- Croatian soap operas: Villa Maria, Zora Dubrovačka, Kud Puklo da Puklo and Larin Izbor.
- Yugoslav classics: Bolji Život.

== See also ==
- RTVBiH
- Federalni Radio
