= BHT1 =

Bosnian national television network

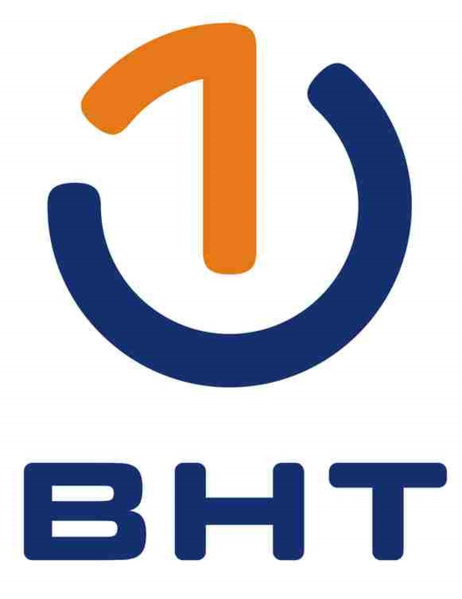
- Logo used until 2012 and again from June 2016
- Country: Bosnia and Herzegovina
- Affiliates: BH Radio 1 and MP BHRT
- Headquarters: Sarajevo

Programming
- Language: Bosnian
- Picture format: 16:9 576i (SDTV); 16:9 1080i (HDTV)

Ownership
- Owner: Radio and Television of Bosnia and Herzegovina
- Key people: Neda Tadić (head of BHT1)

History
- Launched: 1961; 65 years ago
- Former names: RTV Sarajevo (1961–1992); RTV BiH (tvbih) (1992–1995); BHT (1995–1998); PBS BiH (BHTV1) (1998–2004)

Links
- Website: www.bhrt.ba

Availability

Terrestrial
- Terrestrial signal: More than 97% territory of Bosnia and Herzegovina

Streaming media
- BHRT.ba: Watch live

Logo of BHT1 used from 2012 until June 2016.

BHT1 is a Bosnian national public mainstream TV channel operated by Radio and Television of Bosnia and Herzegovina (BHRT). The channel broadcasts on a daily basis for 20 hours in one of the two alphabets (Bosnian Latin alphabet and Bosnian Cyrillic alphabet). This television channel broadcasts a variety of programmes such as news, talk shows, documentaries, sports, movies, and children's programs. BHT1 also broadcasts teletext services.

== History ==
It started broadcasting on 1 June 1961 relaying programmes produced in Zagreb and Belgrade, then it produced its own news magazine from 17 March 1969, followed by the inaugural Dnevnik on 25 February 1971. It migrated to the Television House in 1975.

After attempting to survive in the 1990s when the country was living through a war, BHTV1 resumed in 2002 following the passage of the PBSBiH Act. It did not receive its own frequency again until August 2004, up until then, it had its airtime given to FTV and RTRS.

The channel achieved record high viewing figures during the 2022 FIFA World Cup.

Normal programming (except news) was suspended on 26 February 2026, being replaced by a message telling viewers that there is a possibility that BHRT will shut down.

== Current line-up ==
=== News programme ===
- Dnevnik - main news in 12:00 and 19:00
- Vijesti - news, runs in 07:00, 10:00, around 14:00, and around 22:00
- Regionalni dnevnik - (Regional news) local news from Bosnian major cities (Sarajevo, Banja Luka, Bihać, Zenica,...)
- Jutro za sve - (Morning For All), morning programme
- BHT1 Uživo (BHT1 Live), programme about discussing current topics with guests
- Govor tišine - (Speech of silence), weekly review from other TV shows (like news) that are broadcast in sign language
- Global - magazine about world news, business and politics
- Euroimpuls - programme dedicated to Accession of Bosnia and Herzegovina to the European Union
- Agro-Ekologija - (Agroecology), news from around the world in terms of ecology
- TV Liberty

=== Talk shows ===
- Jedan - (One), interview with various guests from Bosnia and Herzegovina

=== Music and Entertainment ===
- Inbox - magazine about music and entertainment
- Konačno petak! - (Finally Friday!), live entertainment show, hosted by famous bh. television anchor Maja Miralem
- BH gastro kutak - (BH gastro corner) cooking show with guests who prepare traditional Bosnian cuisine
- BHRT Top 15 - weekly top 15 show of the latest song hits from Bosnia and Herzegovina
- BHRT Plesna lista - (BHRT Dance List), weekly top 15 show of the latest dance hits from around the world
- Narodni studio - (Folk Studio), music programme about the latest folksong hits
- Corner - music show where the MP BHRT band perform covers of well-known domestic and worldwide hits along with a guest
- Tamburaši i Vi - (Tambourines and You), music show where the MP BHRT Tambourine Orchestra perform covers of well-known folksongs along with a guest

=== Sports programme ===
- BHT Sport - sport news
- Matches of Bosnian basketball clubs
- Matches of Bosnian handball clubs

=== Documentary programme ===
- Putevi zdravlja - (Ways of Health), magazine about health, herbs, beauty and wellness
- Smanji gas! - (Slow Down!), TV show dedicated to news from the auto industry, auto show, advice on car maintenance and stories about Bosnian auto racing
- Nova avantura - (New Adventure), documentary show in which natural curiosities and geological research are presented
- Potrošački smjer - (Consumer Way), TV show about consumer rights
- Identiteti - (Identities), TV show about national minorities

=== Culture programme ===
- Dimenzija više - weekly TV programme that presents all major cultural events in Bosnia and Herzegovina (from museums, exhibitions, book presentations, concerts of classical music, theater, and up to the opera and ballet)
- Dimenzija više Specijal - TV programme that presents all major cultural events during special festivals such as: Sarajevo Film Festival, International Theatre Festival MESS Sarajevo and International festival Sarajevo winter.

=== Children's programme ===
- Frenderi - educational show with multiple seasons about: the geography of Europe and Bosnia and Herzegovina, traffic, letters of the alphabet, numbers, and protecting the environment
- Domaća Zadaća - (Homework) - special educational series
- Terminal 26 - computer science magazine
- Prijatelji životinja - (Friends of Animals), magazine about animals
- Roditeljski sastanak - (Parental Meeting), family magazine
- Uradi Sam, Uradi Sama - (Do It Yourself)
- Lubenica - (Watermelon)
- Latif i Mravko Travko
- BHT Slagalica - (BHT Puzzle)
- Mini school
- Dileme - (Dilemmas), a dialogue show where young people and professionals discuss about challenges everyone faces every day
- Dinousaur Train - in Bosnian: "Voz Dinosaura", dubbed
- old Yugoslav children's shows such as: Mak i Zak (Mac & Zack), Nedeljni Zabavnik (Sunday Entertainer), etc.

=== Foreign series ===
- Yaprak Dökümü - in Bosnian: "Kad lišće pada"
- Kayip - in Bosnian: "Druga strana istine"
- Filinta bir osmanli polisiyesi - in Bosnian: "Filinta"
- Beautiful Beijing - in Bosnian: "Taj divni Peking", documentary show about Beijing
- Deutsche Welle shows Tomorrow Today and Shift
- Other foreign documentaries and movies that appear from time to time
- Old Yugoslav movies that also appear from time to time

== See also ==
- Radio and Television of Bosnia and Herzegovina
- BH Radio 1, national public radio service
- MP BHRT, Music Production of BHRT
