= Radio-Television of the Federation of Bosnia and Herzegovina =

Public broadcaster

Coordinates: 43°52′N 18°25′E

- Type: Broadcast radio, television and online
- Country: Bosnia and Herzegovina
- Headquarters: Sarajevo
- Broadcast area: Federation of Bosnia and Herzegovina
- Key people: Bakir Hadžiomerović (General Director); Ivan Pavković (Executive Director of Programs Sector); Željko Tica (Editor in Chief of FTV); Jara Orozović (Editor in Chief of Federalni Radio)
- Established: 2001
- Launch date: May 7, 2001; 25 years ago (radio); October 27, 2001; 24 years ago (television)
- Radio station: Federalni Radio
- Television channel: Federalna televizija
- Official website: www.rtvfbih.ba

Main headquarters of RTVFBiH located in Sarajevo. This building is also used by BHRT and TVSA.

The Radio-Television of the Federation of Bosnia and Herzegovina (locally known as Radiotelevizija Federacije Bosne i Hercegovine or RTVFBiH for short) is entity level public broadcaster which operates own radio and television services in the Federation of Bosnia and Herzegovina entity.

== Services ==
The radio and television program is mainly produced in Bosnian and Croatian language. Headquarters of RTVFBiH is located in Sarajevo (along with national public broadcaster – BHRT and local public broadcaster TVSA). Television program initially aired on two television channels (FTV1 and FTV2). Since April 2003 the television program is reduced to one (under the label FTV).

RTVFBiH currently consists of two organizational units:

- Federalni Radio – entity level public radio service (Federalni radio) and
- Federalna televizija – entity level public television channel (Federalna televizija)

There is a public corporation in the establishment which should be consisted of all public broadcasters in Bosnia and Herzegovina.

== See also ==
- Federalni Radio
- Federalna televizija
- RTRS
- BHRT
- RTVHB
