= Federalni Radio =

Federalni radio
- Type: Radio network
- Country: Bosnia and Herzegovina
- Headquarters: Sarajevo

Programming
- Language(s): Bosnian; Croatian

Ownership
- Owner: RTVFBiH
- Key people: Jara Orozović (editor-in-chief)

History
- Launch date: 7 May 2001; 24 years ago

Coverage
- Availability: National & international
- Affiliates: Federalna televizija Federalna.ba

Links
- Website: Federalni Radio

Federalni Radio also known as Radio of the Federation of Bosnia and Herzegovina or FR is a Bosnian entity-level public radio station operated by RTVFBiH. The program is broadcast on a daily basis in Bosnian and Croatian. This radio station broadcasts a variety of programs such as news, music, talk shows, radio-drama, sports, mosaic and children's programs.

== See also ==
- List of radio stations in Bosnia and Herzegovina
- RTVFBiH
- Federalna Televizija
