= Geography of Bosnia and Herzegovina =

- Continent: Europe
- Region: Southeastern Europe
- Coordinates: 44°N 18°E
- Area
  - Total: 51,209 km^{2} (19,772 sq mi)
  - Land: 99.8%
  - Water: 0.2%
- Coastline: 24 km (15 mi)
- Borders: Total land borders: 1,538 km
- Highest point: Maglić; 2,386 m
- Lowest point: Adriatic Sea; 0 m
- Longest river: Drina
- Largest lake: Hutovo Blato

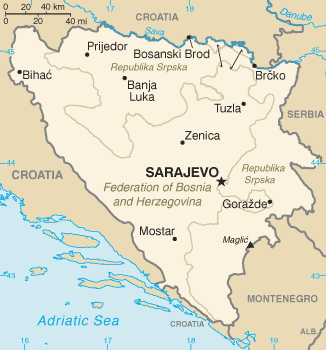

Bosnia and Herzegovina is located in Southeastern Europe. Situated in the western Balkans, it has a 932 km (579 mi) border with Croatia to the north and southwest, a 357 km (222 mi) border with Serbia to the east, and a 249 km (155 mi) border with Montenegro to the southeast. It borders the Adriatic Sea along its 24 km (15 mi) coastline.

The most striking features of the local terrain are valleys and mountains which measure up to 2,386 m (7,828 ft) in height. The country is mostly mountainous, encompassing the central Dinaric Alps. The northeastern parts reach into the Pannonian basin, while in the south it borders the Adriatic Sea.

The country's natural resources include coal, iron ore, bauxite, manganese, nickel, clay, gypsum, salt, sand, timber and hydropower.

== Regions ==
The country's name comes from the two regions Bosnia and Herzegovina, which have a very vaguely defined border between them. Bosnia occupies the northern areas which are roughly four fifths of the entire country, while Herzegovina occupies the rest in the southern part of the country.

The major cities are the capital Sarajevo, Banja Luka and Bihać in the northwest region known as Bosanska Krajina, Tuzla in the northeast, Zenica in the central part of Bosnia and Mostar is the capital of Herzegovina.

The south part of Bosnia has Mediterranean climate and a great deal of agriculture. Central Bosnia is the most mountainous part of Bosnia featuring prominent mountains Vlašić, Čvrsnica, and Prenj. Eastern Bosnia also features mountains like Trebević, Jahorina, Igman, Bjelašnica and Treskavica. It was here that the 1984 Winter Olympics were held.

In Bosnia and Herzegovina forest cover is around 43% of the total land area, equivalent to 2,187,910 hectares (ha) of forest in 2020, down from 2,210,000 hectares (ha) in 1990. For the year 2015, 74% of the forest area was reported to be under public ownership and 26% private ownership. Eastern Bosnia is heavily forested along the river Drina and most forest areas are in Central, Eastern and Western parts of Bosnia. Northern Bosnia contains very fertile agricultural land along the river Sava and the corresponding area is heavily farmed. This farmland is a part of the Parapannonian Plain stretching into neighbouring Croatia and Serbia. The river Sava and corresponding Posavina river basin hold the cities of Brčko, Bosanski Šamac, Bosanski Brod and Bosanska Gradiška.

The northwest part of Bosnia is called Bosanska Krajina and holds the cities of Banja Luka, Prijedor, Sanski Most, Jajce, Cazin, Velika Kladuša and Bihać. Kozara National Park and Mrakovica World War II monument is located in this region.

The country has only 24 kilometres (14.9 mi) of coastline, around the town of Neum in the Herzegovina-Neretva Canton, although surrounded by Croatian peninsulas it is possible to get to the middle of the Adriatic from Neum. Through the United Nations Convention on the Law of the Sea, Bosnia has a right of innocent passage to the outer sea. Neum has many hotels and is an important tourism destination.

== Rivers ==
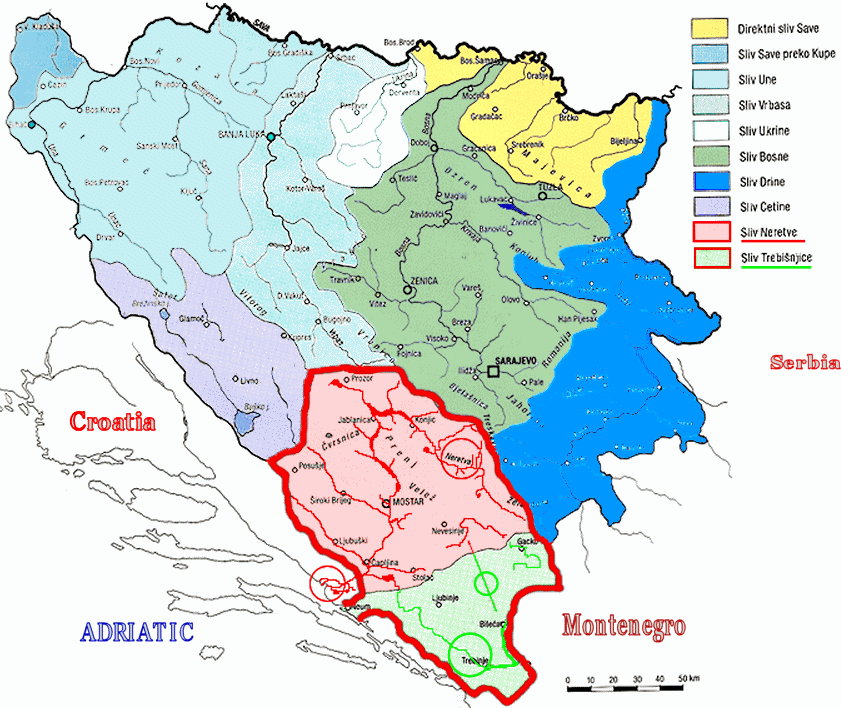
Watersheds in Bosnia and Herzegovina

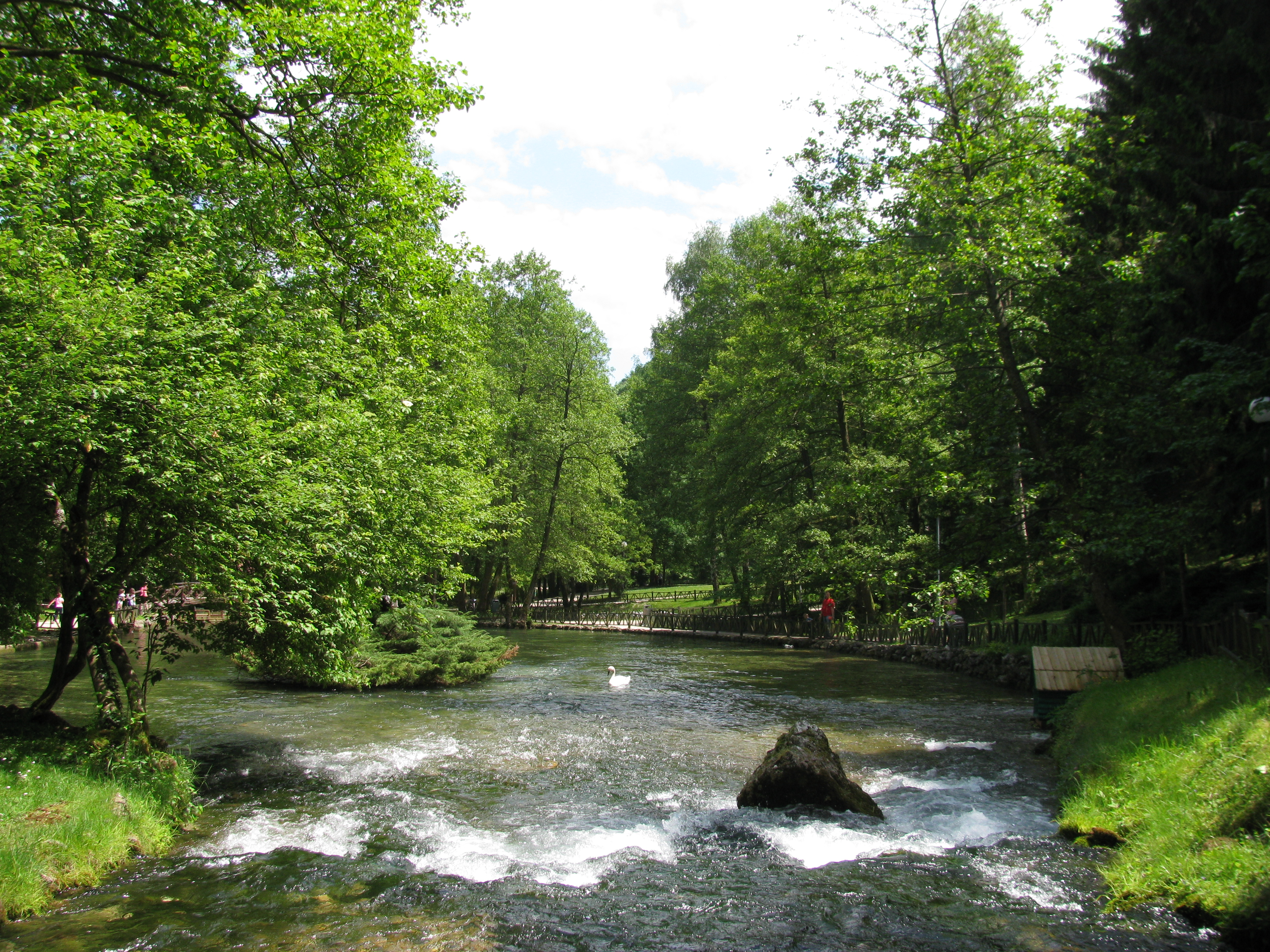
Bosna river, Ilidža

There are seven major rivers of Bosnia and Herzegovina:

- The Una in the northwest part of Bosnia flows along the northern and western border of Bosnia and Croatia and through the Bosnian city of Bihać. It is popular for rafting and adventure sports.
- The Sana flows through the city of Sanski Most and Prijedor and is a tributary of the river Una in the north.
- The Vrbas flows through the cities of Gornji Vakuf – Uskoplje, Bugojno, Jajce, Banja Luka, Srbac and reaches the river Sava in the north. The Vrbas flows through the central part of Bosnia and flows outwards to the North.
- The Bosna is the longest river in Bosnia and is fully contained within the country as it stretches from its source near Sarajevo to the river Sava in the north. It gave its name to the country.
- The Drina flows through the eastern part of Bosnia, at many places in the border between Bosnia and Serbia. The Drina flows through the cities of Foča, Goražde Višegrad and Zvornik.
- The Neretva is the longest river in Herzegovina, flowing from Jablanica south to the Adriatic Sea. The river is famous as it flows through the city of Mostar.
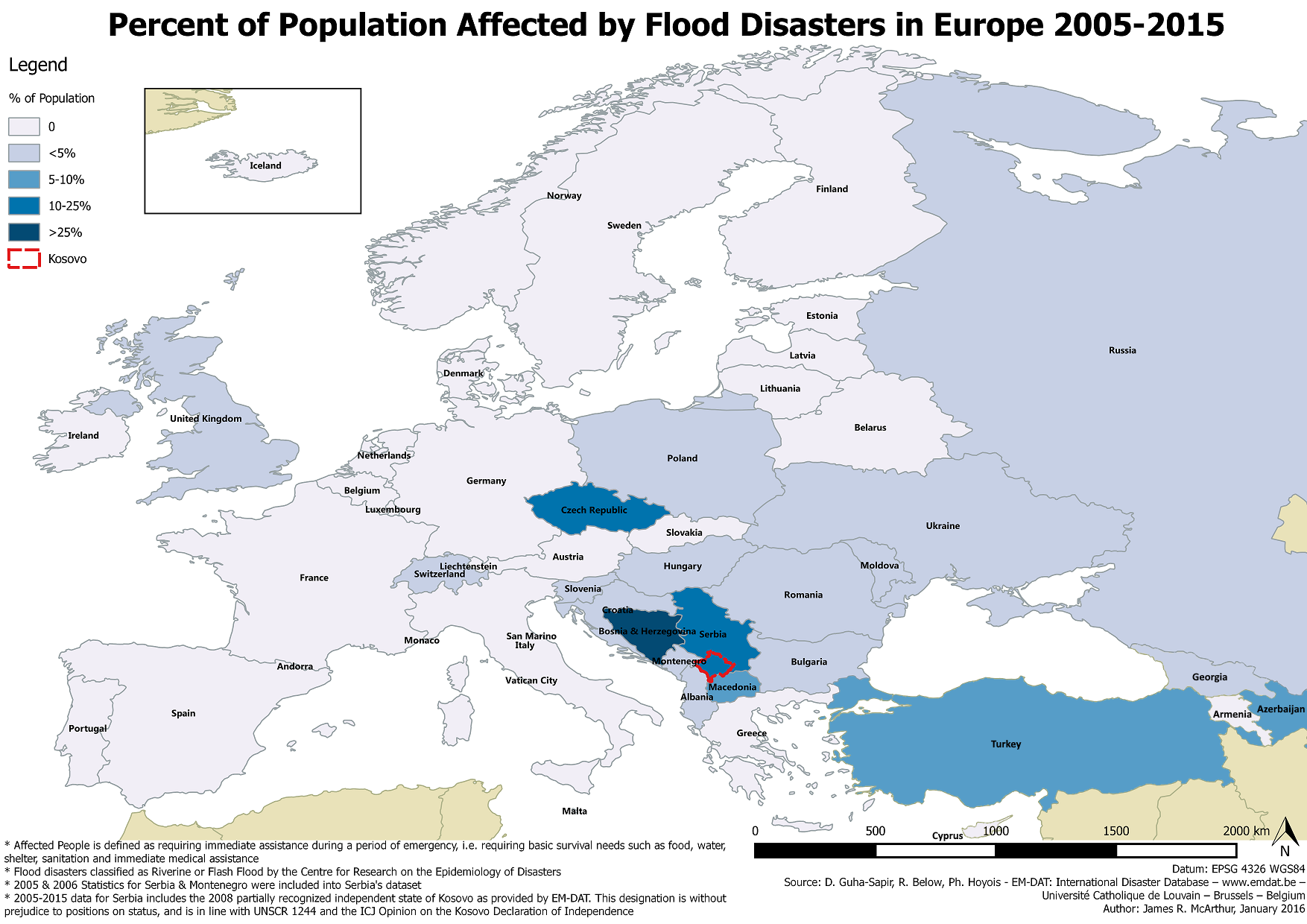
  Percent of population affected by Flood Disasters in Europe by country from 2005 to 2015.

The Sava is the longest river in Bosnia and Herzegovina. However, within Bosnia and Herzegovina, it only runs along the border with Croatia. It then flows into Serbia. Towns like Brčko, Bosanski Šamac, and Bosanska Gradiška lie on the river.

== Phytogeography ==
Phytogeographically, Bosnia and Herzegovina belongs to the Boreal Kingdom and is shared between the Illyrian province of the Circumboreal Region and Adriatic province of the Mediterranean Region. According to the WWF, the territory of Bosnia and Herzegovina can be subdivided into three ecoregions: the Pannonian mixed forests, Dinaric Mountains mixed forests and Illyrian deciduous forests.

== Climate ==
Except for the easternmost provinces, the country experiences a wet Mediterranean climate.

Climate data for Mostar (1961–1990 normals, extremes 1949–present)
Month	Jan	Feb	Mar	Apr	May	Jun	Jul	Aug	Sep	Oct	Nov	Dec	Year
Record high °C (°F)	18.2 (64.8)	25.0 (77.0)	27.6 (81.7)	31.5 (88.7)	35.6 (96.1)	41.2 (106.2)	46.2 (115.2)	43.1 (109.6)	38.8 (101.8)	32.5 (90.5)	25.5 (77.9)	19.4 (66.9)	46.2 (115.2)
Mean daily maximum °C (°F)	8.3 (46.9)	10.8 (51.4)	14.6 (58.3)	19.0 (66.2)	24.0 (75.2)	27.6 (81.7)	31.1 (88.0)	31.2 (88.2)	26.9 (80.4)	21.0 (69.8)	14.5 (58.1)	9.7 (49.5)	19.9 (67.8)
Daily mean °C (°F)	4.8 (40.6)	6.6 (43.9)	9.7 (49.5)	13.3 (55.9)	18.0 (64.4)	21.5 (70.7)	24.7 (76.5)	24.2 (75.6)	20.4 (68.7)	15.3 (59.5)	10.1 (50.2)	6.2 (43.2)	14.6 (58.3)
Mean daily minimum °C (°F)	1.9 (35.4)	3.2 (37.8)	5.4 (41.7)	8.4 (47.1)	12.5 (54.5)	15.8 (60.4)	18.6 (65.5)	18.4 (65.1)	15.3 (59.5)	11.2 (52.2)	6.7 (44.1)	3.3 (37.9)	10.1 (50.2)
Record low °C (°F)	−10.9 (12.4)	−9.6 (14.7)	−6.5 (20.3)	−1.2 (29.8)	3.3 (37.9)	8.0 (46.4)	8.4 (47.1)	9.6 (49.3)	6.4 (43.5)	−0.1 (31.8)	−4.8 (23.4)	−7.8 (18.0)	−10.9 (12.4)
Average precipitation mm (inches)	164.7 (6.48)	153.2 (6.03)	150.0 (5.91)	127.3 (5.01)	102.1 (4.02)	77.9 (3.07)	44.8 (1.76)	73.7 (2.90)	96.3 (3.79)	153.5 (6.04)	199.9 (7.87)	178.9 (7.04)	1,522.5 (59.94)
Average precipitation days (≥ 0.1 mm)	12.5	12.1	12.4	13.0	12.3	11.6	7.4	7.4	8.2	10.3	13.4	13.1	133.8
Average snowy days (≥ 1.0 cm)	2.9	1.5	0.6	0.0	0.0	0.0	0.0	0.0	0.0	0.0	0.1	1.2	6.3
Average relative humidity (%)	65.9	63.3	61.0	61.8	62.7	61.2	52.7	53.7	60.1	65.2	69.3	67.4	62.0
Mean monthly sunshine hours	109.3	117.5	155.3	173.9	222.7	252.1	322.8	296.2	230.7	186.8	116.6	102.8	2,286.5
Source: Meteorological Institute of Bosnia and Herzegovina

The hills and mountains are drier, colder, windier, and cloudier.

Climate data for Sarajevo
Month	Jan	Feb	Mar	Apr	May	Jun	Jul	Aug	Sep	Oct	Nov	Dec	Year
Record high °C (°F)	18.2 (64.8)	21.4 (70.5)	26.6 (79.9)	30.2 (86.4)	33.2 (91.8)	35.9 (96.6)	38.2 (100.8)	40.0 (104.0)	37.7 (99.9)	32.2 (90.0)	24.7 (76.5)	18.0 (64.4)	40.0 (104.0)
Mean daily maximum °C (°F)	3.7 (38.7)	6.0 (42.8)	10.9 (51.6)	15.6 (60.1)	21.4 (70.5)	24.5 (76.1)	27.0 (80.6)	27.2 (81.0)	22.0 (71.6)	17.0 (62.6)	9.7 (49.5)	4.2 (39.6)	15.8 (60.4)
Daily mean °C (°F)	0.2 (32.4)	1.8 (35.2)	6.0 (42.8)	10.2 (50.4)	15.2 (59.4)	18.2 (64.8)	20.3 (68.5)	20.4 (68.7)	16.0 (60.8)	11.7 (53.1)	5.8 (42.4)	1.2 (34.2)	10.6 (51.1)
Mean daily minimum °C (°F)	−3.3 (26.1)	−2.5 (27.5)	1.1 (34.0)	4.8 (40.6)	9.0 (48.2)	11.9 (53.4)	13.7 (56.7)	13.7 (56.7)	10.0 (50.0)	6.4 (43.5)	1.9 (35.4)	−1.8 (28.8)	5.4 (41.7)
Record low °C (°F)	−26.8 (−16.2)	−23.4 (−10.1)	−26.4 (−15.5)	−13.2 (8.2)	−9.0 (15.8)	−3.2 (26.2)	−2.7 (27.1)	−1.0 (30.2)	−4.0 (24.8)	−10.9 (12.4)	−19.3 (−2.7)	−22.4 (−8.3)	−26.8 (−16.2)
Average precipitation mm (inches)	68 (2.7)	64 (2.5)	70 (2.8)	77 (3.0)	72 (2.8)	90 (3.5)	72 (2.8)	66 (2.6)	91 (3.6)	86 (3.4)	85 (3.3)	86 (3.4)	928 (36.5)
Average rainy days	8	10	13	17	17	16	14	13	15	13	12	11	159
Average snowy days	10	12	9	2	0.2	0	0	0	0	2	6	12	53
Average relative humidity (%)	79	74	68	67	68	70	69	69	75	77	76	81	73
Mean monthly sunshine hours	57.1	83.8	125.6	152.3	191.7	207.1	256.3	238.2	186.6	148.8	81.2	40.7	1,769.4
Source 1: Pogoda.ru.net
Source 2: NOAA (sun, 1961–1990)

The north region has a typical continental climate.

Climate data for Banja Luka
Month	Jan	Feb	Mar	Apr	May	Jun	Jul	Aug	Sep	Oct	Nov	Dec	Year
Record high °C (°F)	22.3 (72.1)	25.2 (77.4)	29.0 (84.2)	31.8 (89.2)	35.2 (95.4)	37.9 (100.2)	41.6 (106.9)	41.1 (106.0)	40.2 (104.4)	30.9 (87.6)	27.1 (80.8)	23.2 (73.8)	41.6 (106.9)
Mean daily maximum °C (°F)	6.7 (44.1)	7.8 (46.0)	13.7 (56.7)	19.3 (66.7)	23.2 (73.8)	27.3 (81.1)	29.9 (85.8)	30.1 (86.2)	24.3 (75.7)	18.5 (65.3)	13.0 (55.4)	7.2 (45.0)	18.4 (65.1)
Daily mean °C (°F)	1.7 (35.1)	2.5 (36.5)	7.3 (45.1)	12.5 (54.5)	16.8 (62.2)	20.8 (69.4)	22.8 (73.0)	22.3 (72.1)	17.1 (62.8)	11.8 (53.2)	7.3 (45.1)	2.8 (37.0)	12.1 (53.8)
Mean daily minimum °C (°F)	−2.1 (28.2)	−1.4 (29.5)	1.8 (35.2)	6.4 (43.5)	10.0 (50.0)	14.4 (57.9)	16.0 (60.8)	15.6 (60.1)	11.4 (52.5)	7.0 (44.6)	3.2 (37.8)	−0.7 (30.7)	6.8 (44.2)
Record low °C (°F)	−22.8 (−9.0)	−21.5 (−6.7)	−18.2 (−0.8)	−5.9 (21.4)	0.0 (32.0)	4.0 (39.2)	6.7 (44.1)	6.1 (43.0)	0.0 (32.0)	−5.5 (22.1)	−11.0 (12.2)	−18.0 (−0.4)	−22.8 (−9.0)
Average precipitation mm (inches)	71.7 (2.82)	67.6 (2.66)	77.8 (3.06)	86.5 (3.41)	98.3 (3.87)	109.2 (4.30)	73.9 (2.91)	74.2 (2.92)	83.9 (3.30)	103.9 (4.09)	89.5 (3.52)	100.8 (3.97)	1,037.2 (40.83)
Average precipitation days (≥ 1.0 mm)	8.9	9.7	9.4	9.2	9.8	8.1	7.9	5.8	7.9	8.9	8.1	10.2	104.0
Average relative humidity (%)	82	80	73	69	71	71	70	73	78	82	84	83	76
Mean monthly sunshine hours	54	71	125	158	206	222	272	238	186	133	70	46	1,781
Source: Deutscher Wetterdienst (temperatures, 1992–2016, extremes 1973–2016, precipitation, 1926–2016, precipitation days, 1992–2016, humidity, 1973–1991 and sun, 1961–1990) (Note: Station ID for Banja Luka is 14542 Use this station ID to locate the sunshine duration)

=== Climate change ===
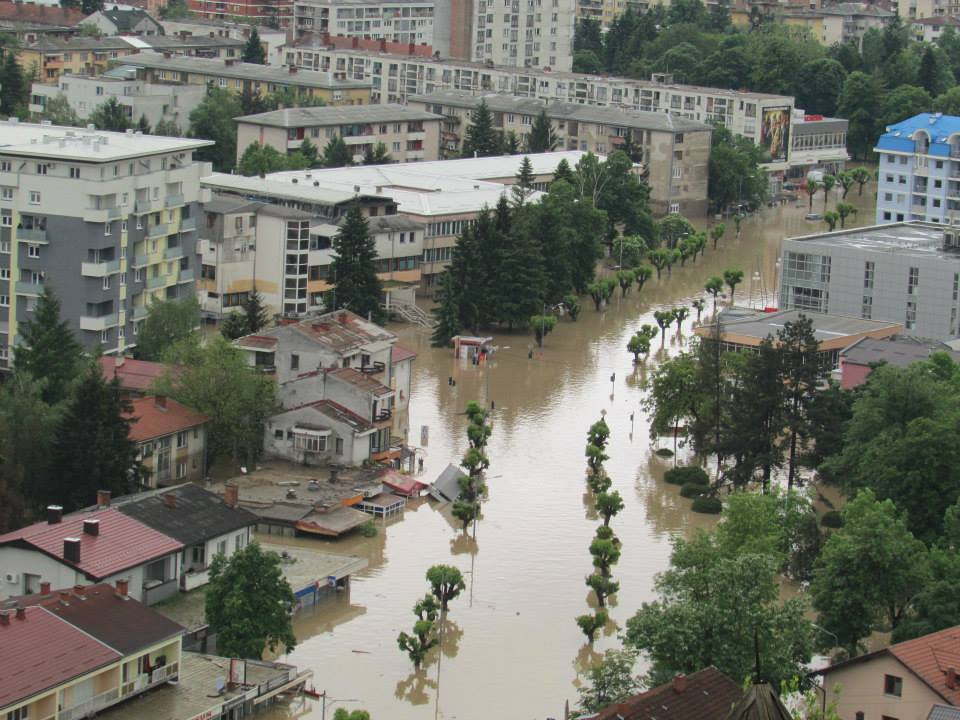
Floods in 2014 severely affected Bosnia and Herzegovina, as pictured in Doboj.

Bosnia and Herzegovina is considered vulnerable to climate change, with limited capacity to adapt. Between 1961 and 2016, the country's climate warmed and precipitation became more intense. The country has experienced extreme weather events, in particular a severe drought in 2012 and floods in 2014, which had severe economic consequences. Further consequences are expected as the global climate continues to warm. The agricultural sector, which forms a significant part of the economy and supports its majority rural population, is also being significantly affected. Tourism, energy production and consumption are also affected by climate change.

== Mining industry ==
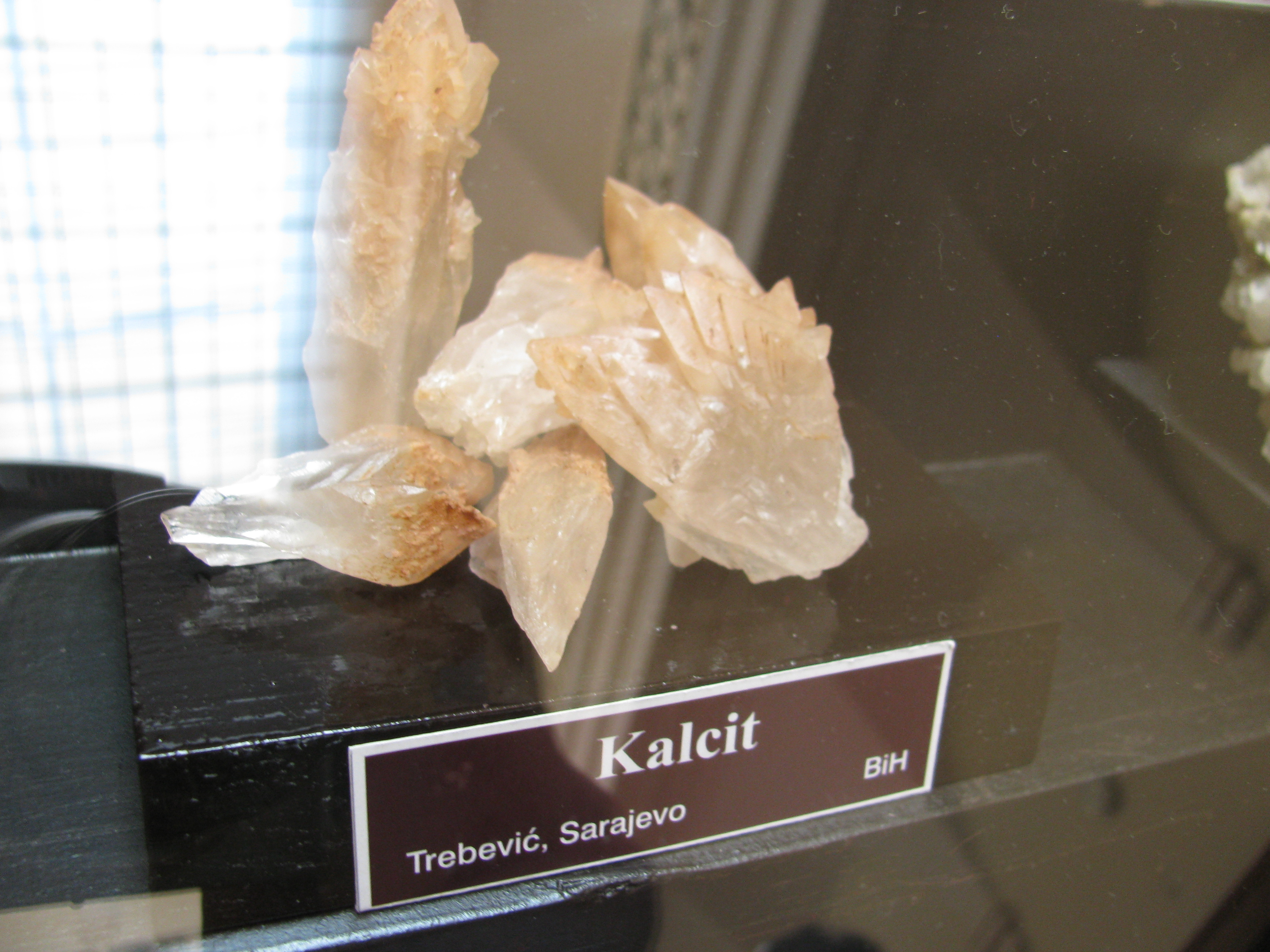
Calcite Crystal found at Trebević mountain around Sarajevo; Bosnia and Herzegovina on display at National Museum of Bosnia and Herzegovina.

Various archaeological artifacts including relicts of mining activities and tools belonging to similar age groups, provide an indication of the geographical distribution, scale and methods of mining activities in Bosnia and Herzegovina during the Paleolithic to Roman era.

Most important of these is the so-called area of “central Bosnian mountains” located between the rivers Vrbas, Lašva, Neretva, Rama and their tributaries. The second one is the area of western Bosnia, bordered by the Vrbas and Una rivers, with its main orebearing formations found in the river-valleys of Sana and Japra, and their tributaries. The third area is eastern Bosnia, around the river Drina between the towns of Foča and Zvornik, the principal mining activity centered around Srebrenica.

Ores of various metals, including iron, are found in these areas and exploitation has been going on for more than 5000 years – from the period of prehistoric human settlers, through Illyrian, Roman, Slavic, Turkish and Austrian rulers, into the present.

== Land use ==
- Arable land: 19.73%
- Permanent crops: 2.06%
- Other: 78.22% (2012 est.)

Irrigated land: 30 km^{2} (12 sq mi) (2003)

Total renewable water resources: 37.5 km^{3} (9.0 cu mi) (2011)

== Environment ==
Natural hazards:

- Destructive earthquakes

Current issues:

- Air pollution from metallurgical plants
- Sites for disposing of urban waste are limited
- Widespread casualties, water shortages, and destruction of infrastructure because of the 1992–95 war
- Deforestation

International agreements:

- Party to: Air Pollution, Biodiversity, Climate Change, Desertification, Hazardous Wastes, Law of the Sea, Marine Life Conservation, Nuclear Test Ban, Ozone Layer Protection, Wetlands
- Signed, but not ratified: none

== Extreme points ==
=== Elevation ===
- Highest point: Maglić, at 2,386 m, 43°16′15″N 18°43′35″E, Foča

=== Latitude and longitude ===
- Westernmost point: Baljevac near Bihać, 44°49′31″N 15°43′43″E
- Easternmost point: Žlijebac near Bratunac, 44°3′8″N 19°37′21″E
- Northernmost point: Gradina Donja near Kozarska Dubica, 45°16′33″N 16°55′49″E
- Southernmost point: Podštirovnik near Trebinje, 42°33′19″N 18°26′25″E

=== Centre ===
- Geographical centre: 44°09′55″N 17°47′30″E, Krčevine near Vitez

== Gallery ==
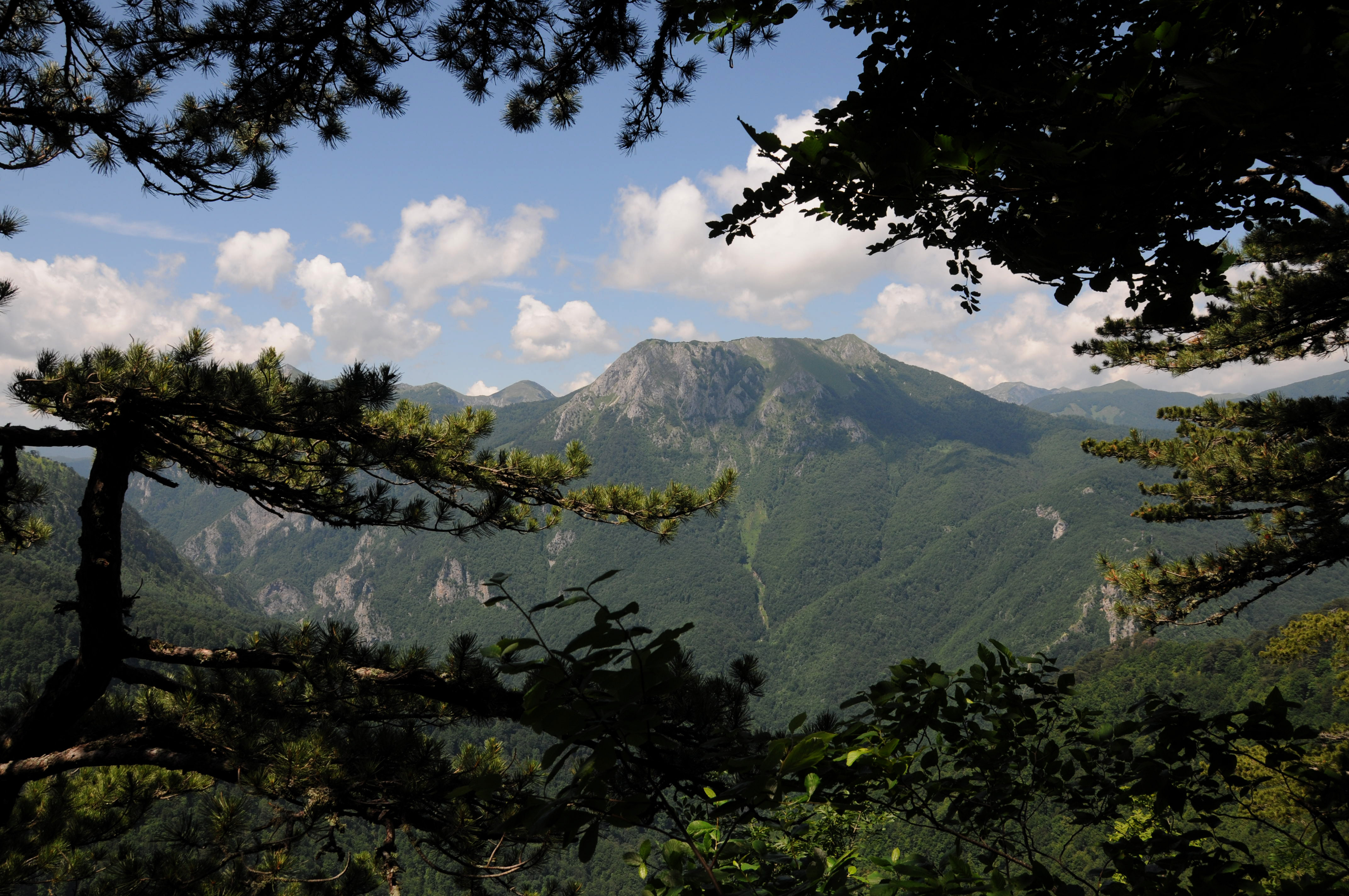
Sutjeska National Park

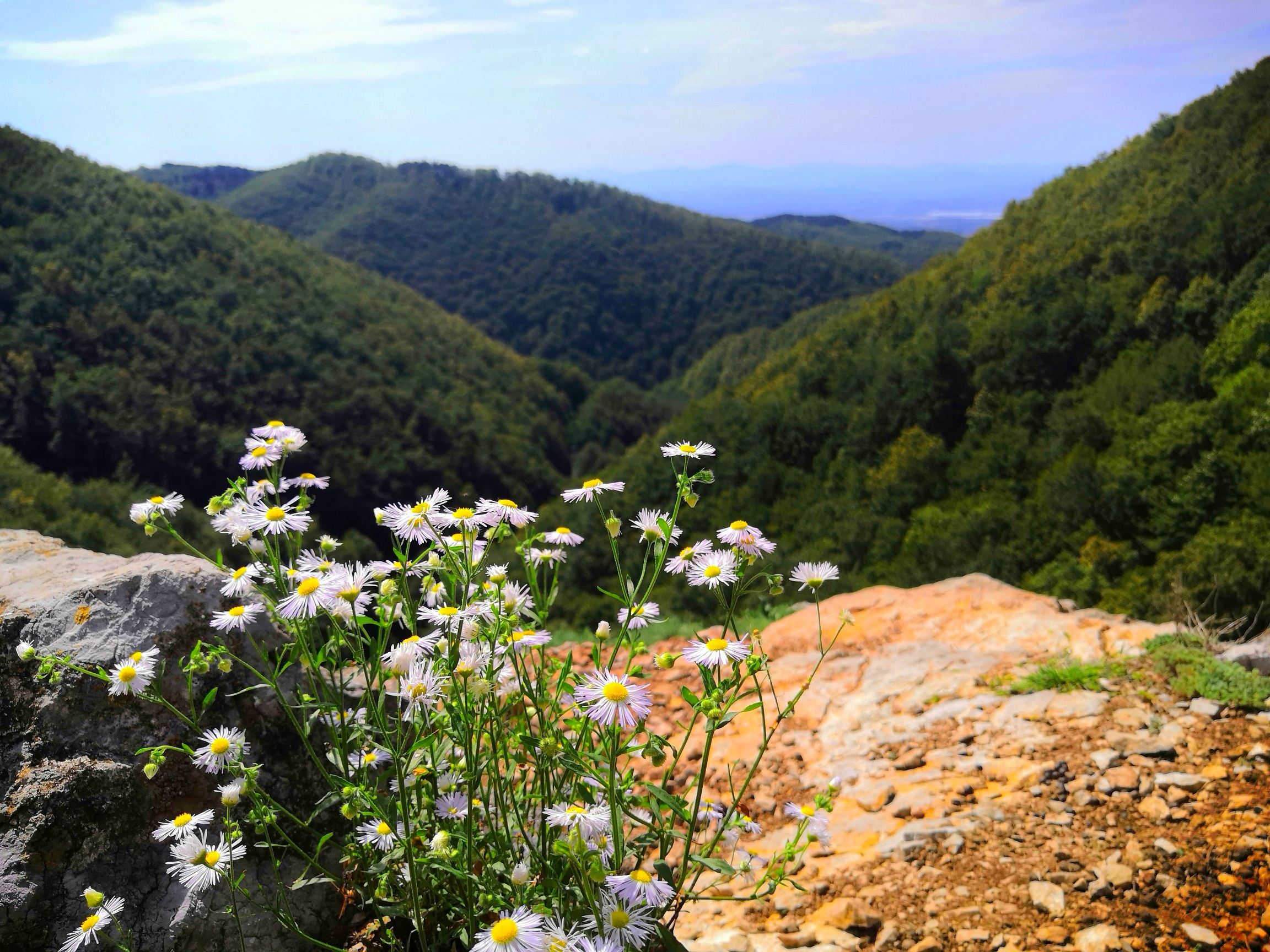
Kozara National Park

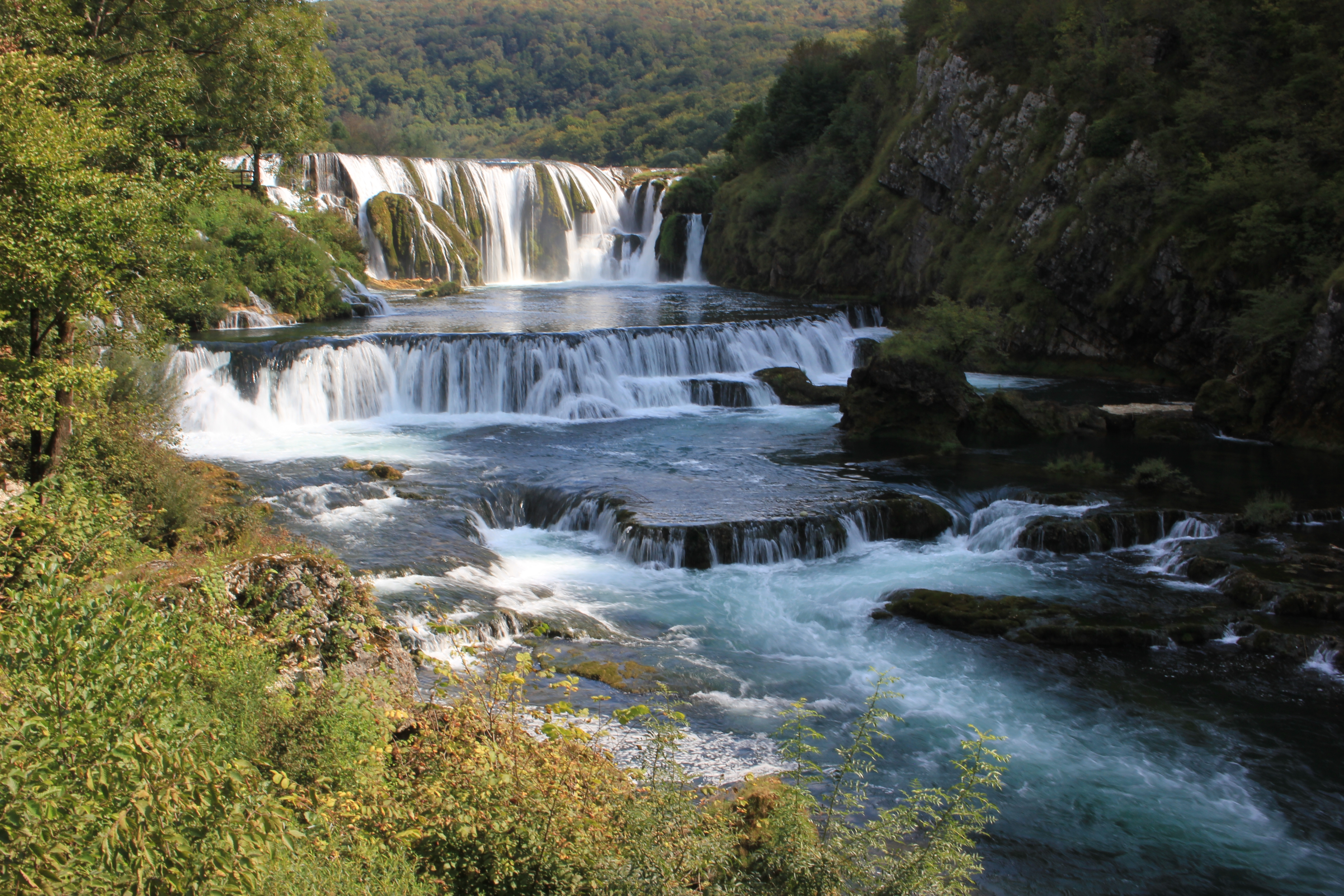
Una National Park

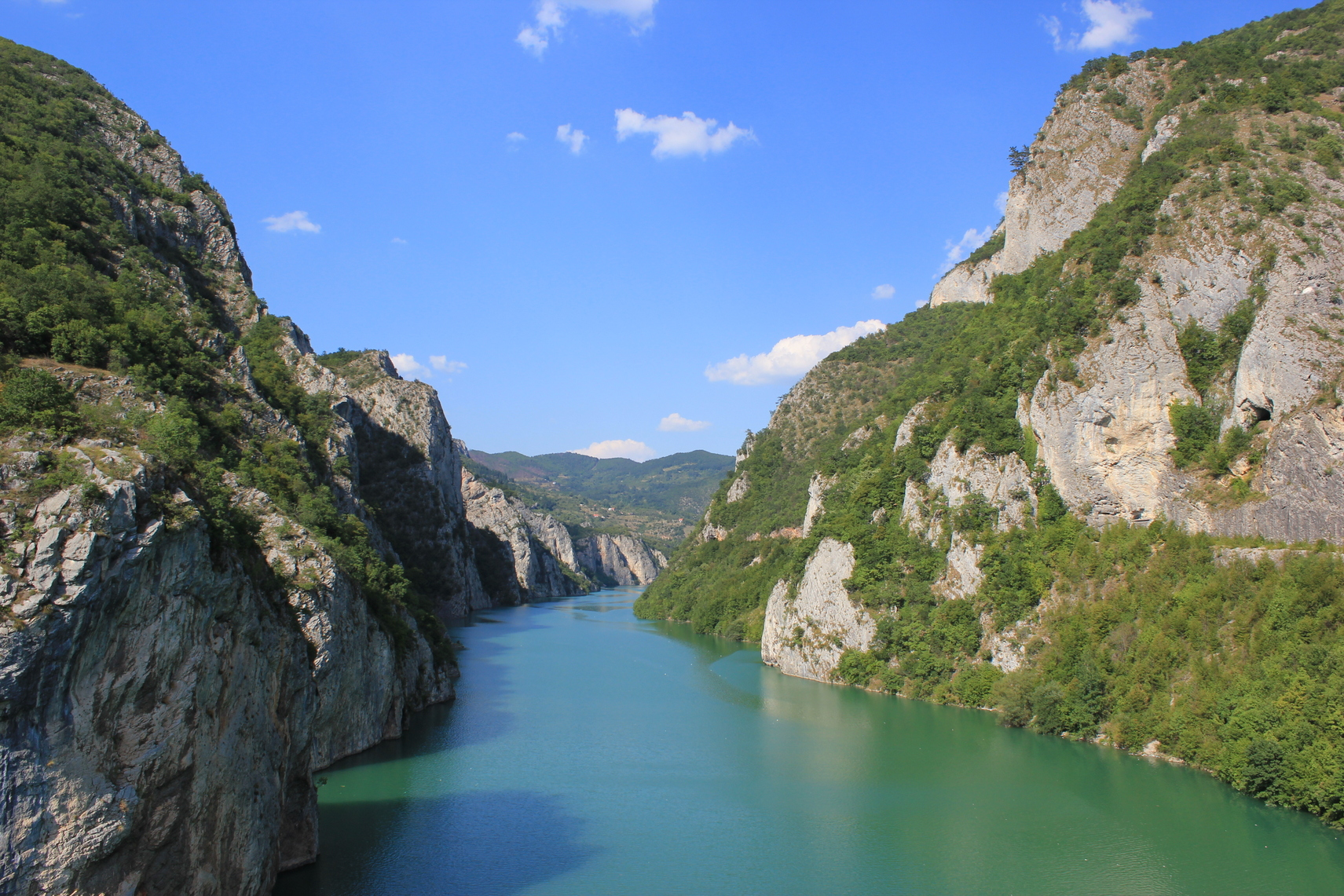
Drina National Park

== See also ==
- Environment of Bosnia and Herzegovina
- Geography of Europe
- List of cities in Bosnia and Herzegovina

== Bibliography ==
- Poljak, Željko (February 1959). "Ostali članci o Bosni i Hercegovini". Kazalo za "Hrvatski planinar" i "Naše planine" 1898—1958 (PDF). Naše planine (in Croatian). Vol. XI. pp. 24–24. ISSN 0354-0650.
