= Krčevine =

Krčevine may refer to:

Bosnia-Herzegovina

- Krčevine (Busovača), village
- Krčevine (Ilijaš), village
- Krčevine (Kiseljak), village
- Krčevine (Šipovo), village near Šipovo
- Krčevine, Vareš, village
- Krčevine, Vitez, village

Croatia

- Rezovačke Krčevine, a village near Virovitica
