= List of protected areas of Bosnia and Herzegovina =

Protected areas in Bosnia Herzegovina

Total size of protected area of Bosnia and Herzegovina amounts of 57.83694 hectares (142.9182 acres), which is 1,13% of its entire territory. This is a list of areas protected by corresponding levels of the government of Bosnia and Herzegovina, namely at the entity's levels, and with various categorizations.

== National parks ==
National parks of Bosnia and Herzegovina listed as follows:

Name	Founded in	Area (km^{2})	Part of
NP1 Sutjeska National Park	1965	173	RS
NP2 Kozara National Park	1967	34	RS
NP3 Una National Park	2008	198	FBiH
NP4 Drina National Park	2017	63	RS

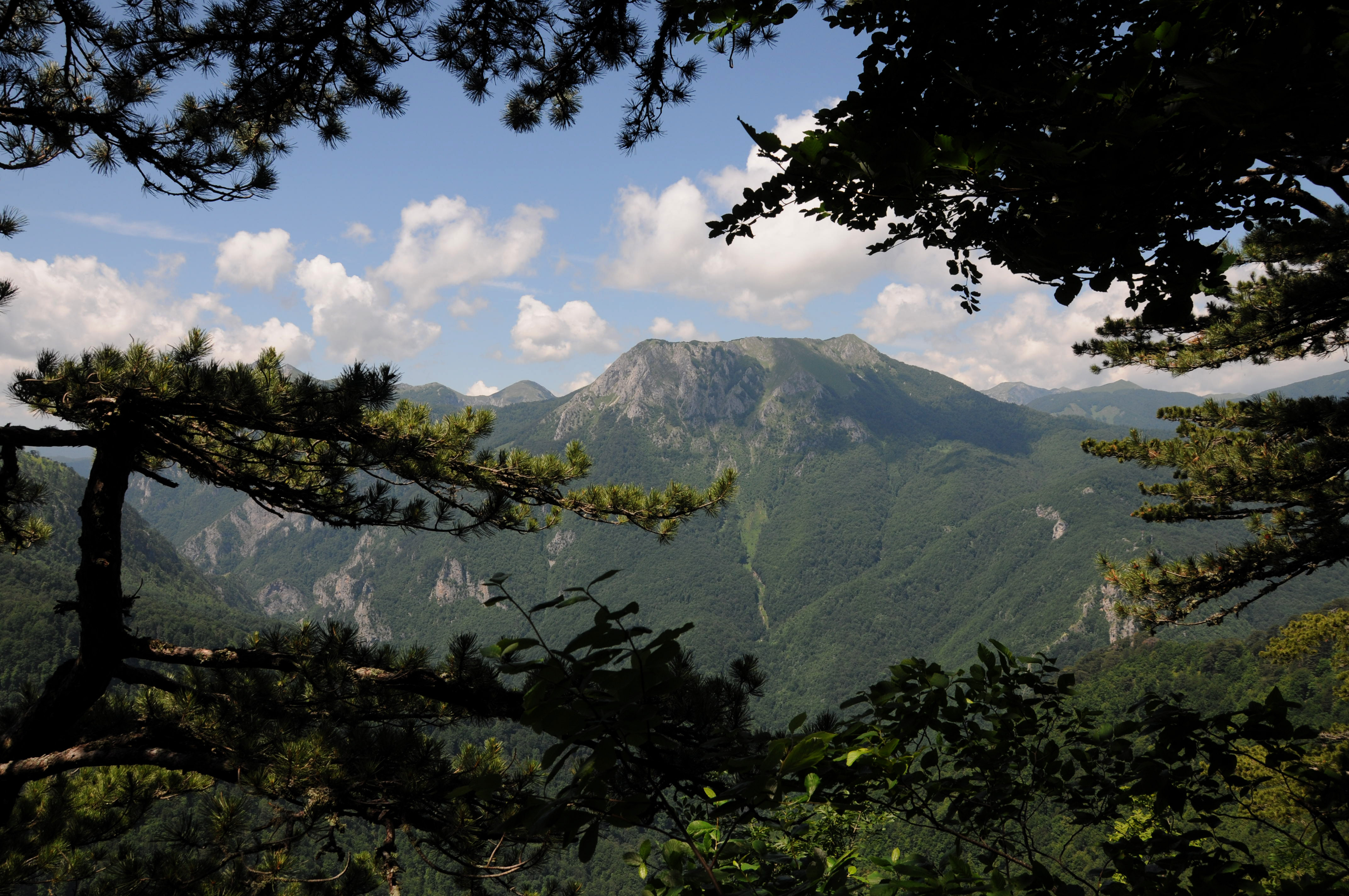
Sutjeska National Park

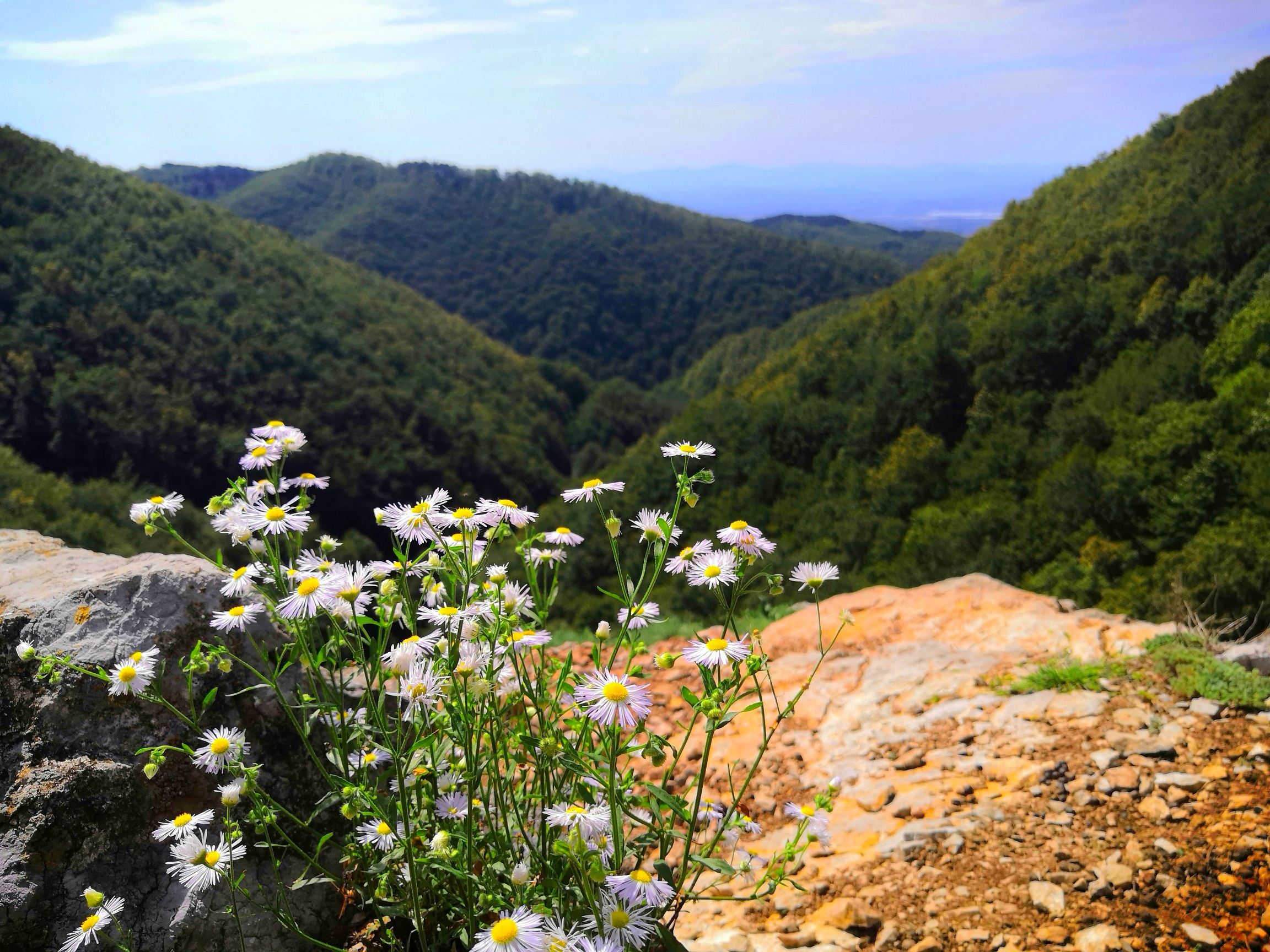
Kozara National Park

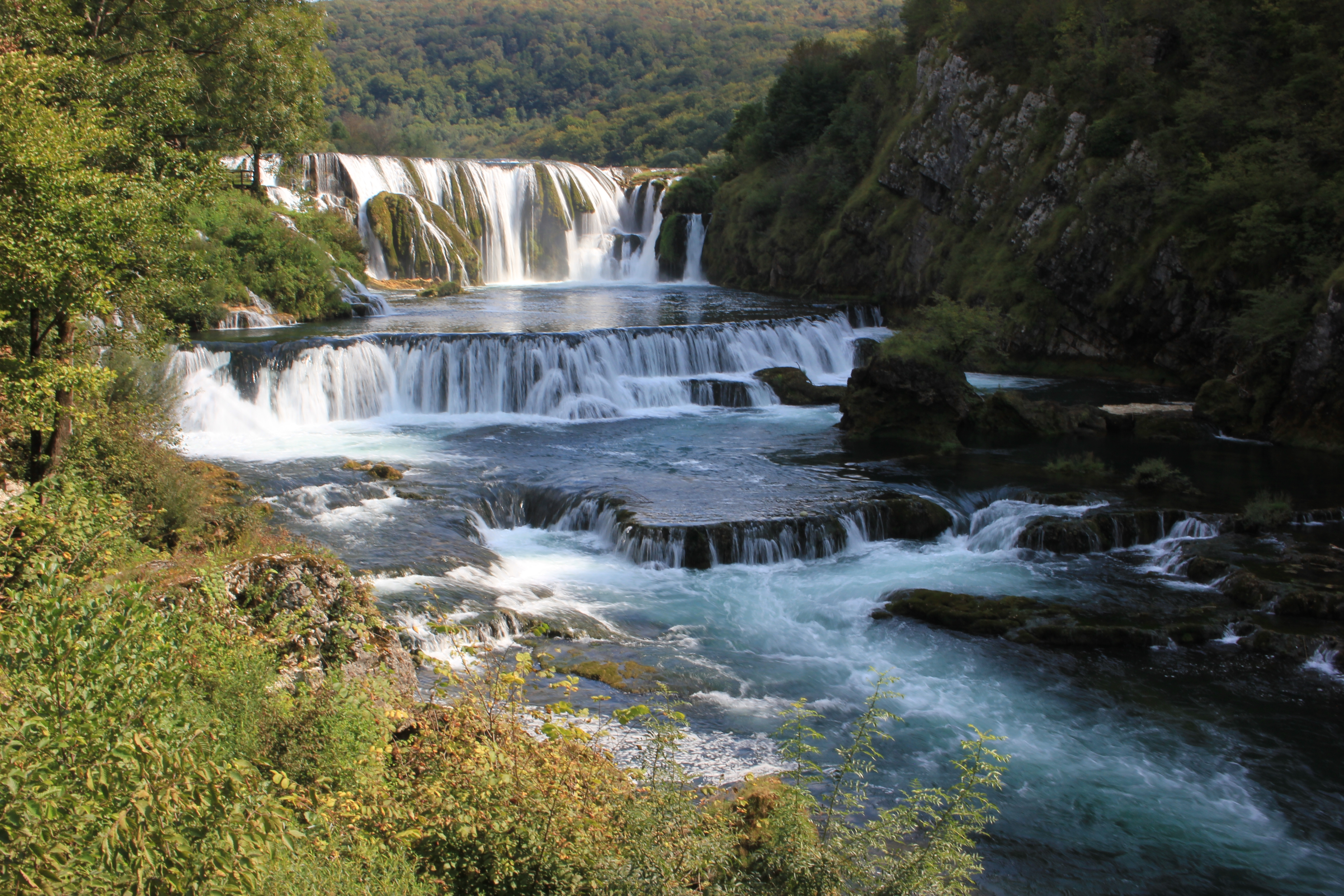
Una National Park

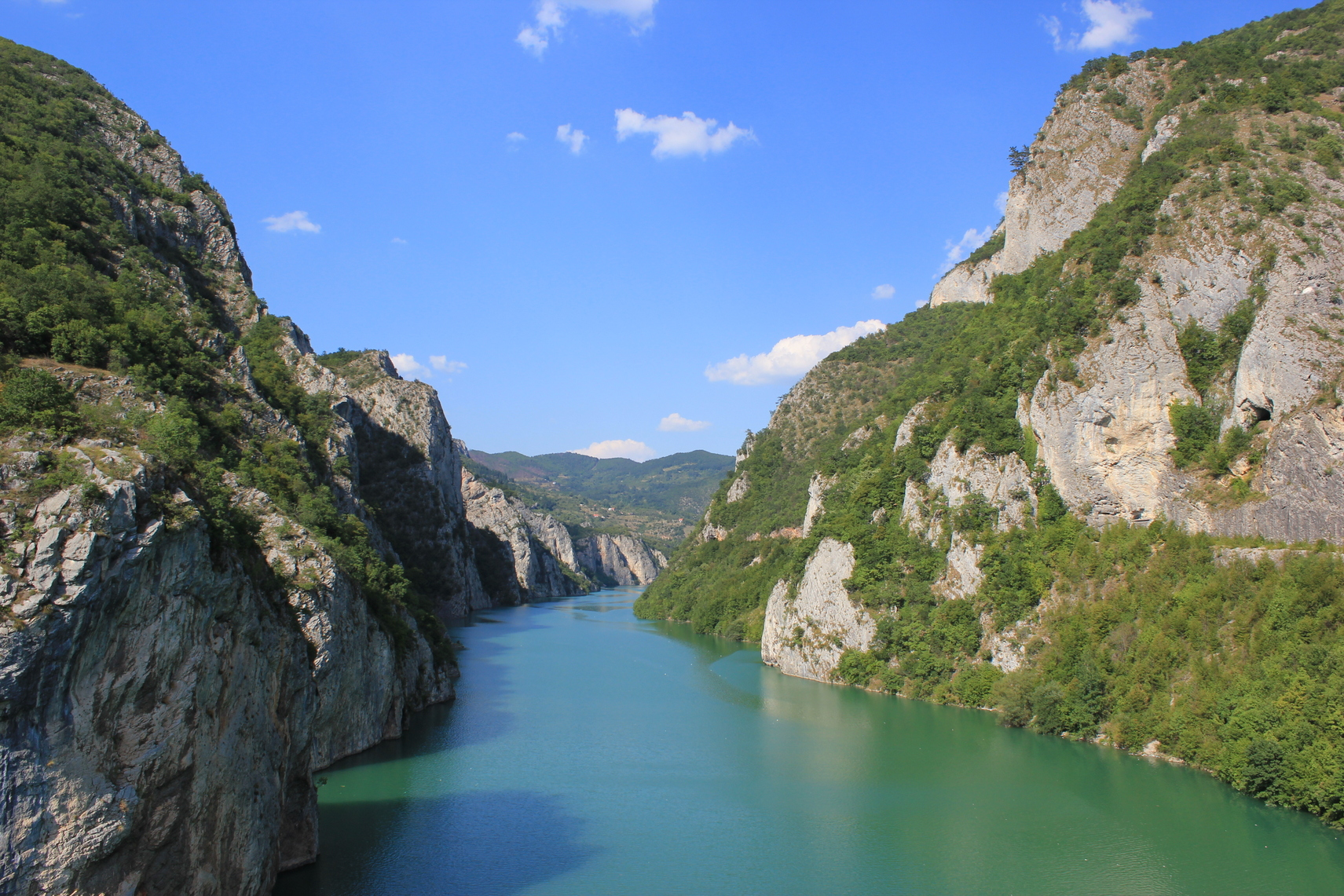
Drina National Park

== Nature parks ==
Nature parks of Bosnia and Herzegovina listed as follows:

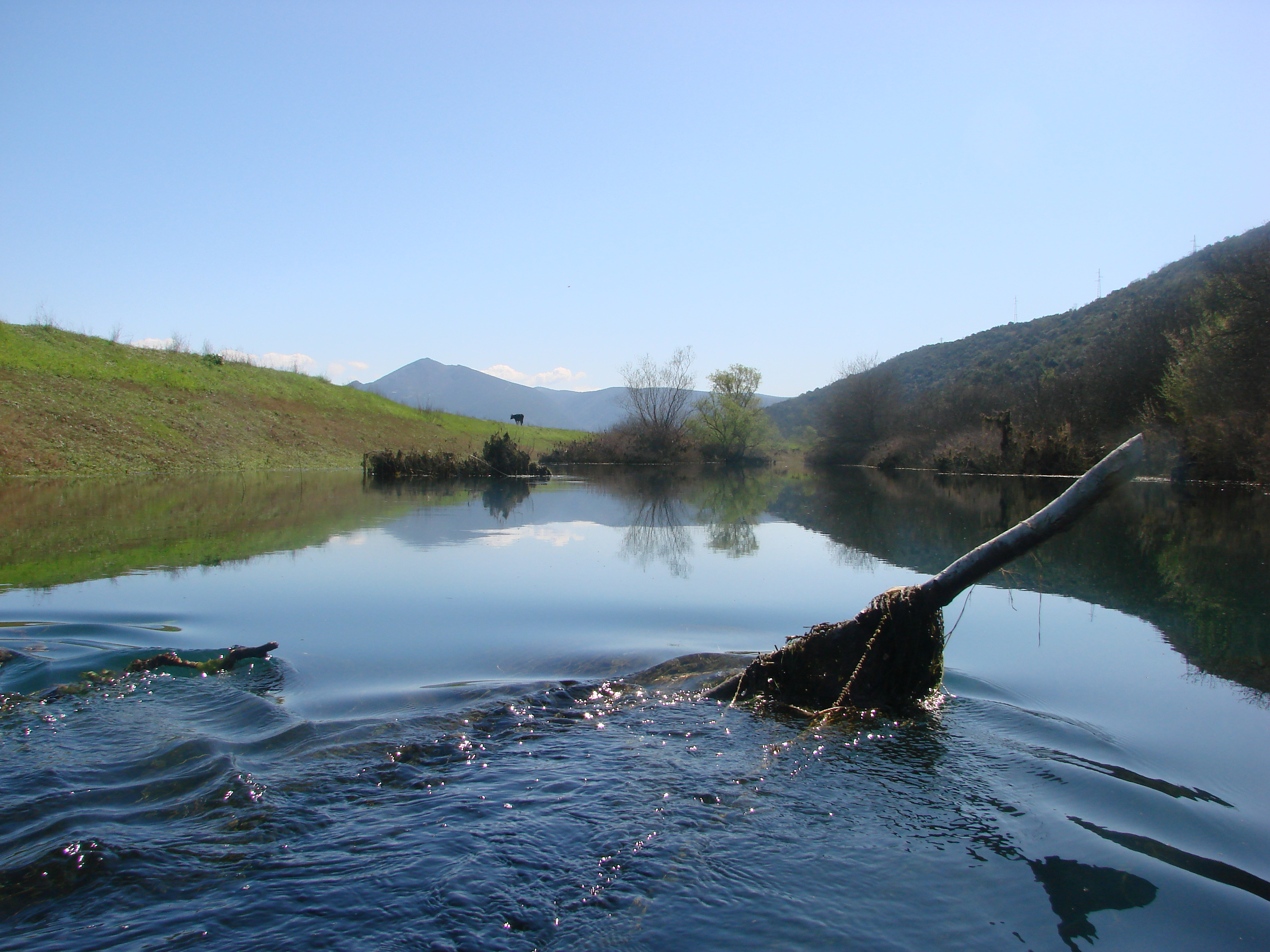
PP1 Hutovo Blato

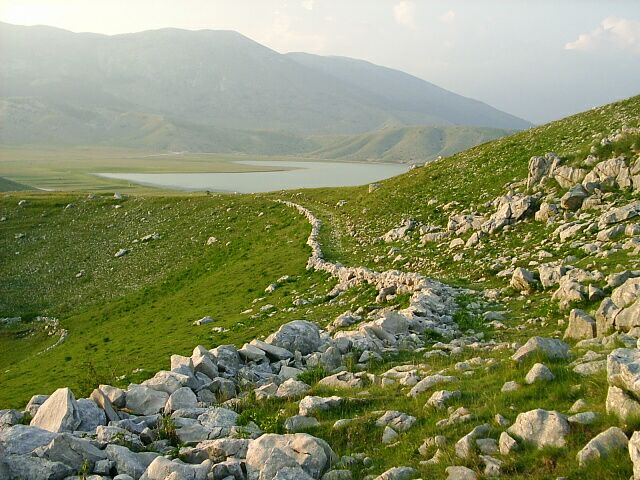
PP2 Blidinje

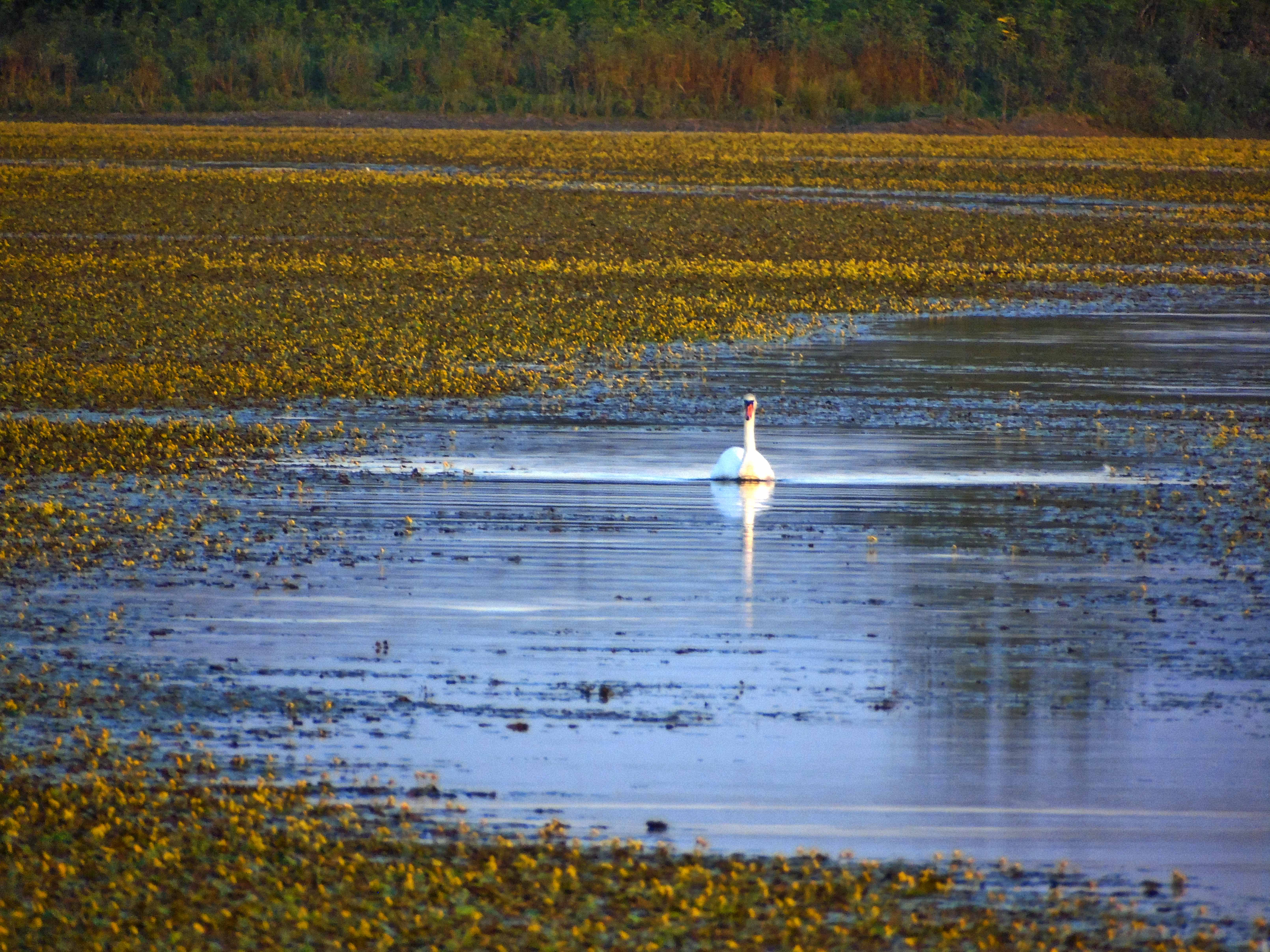
PP3 Bardača

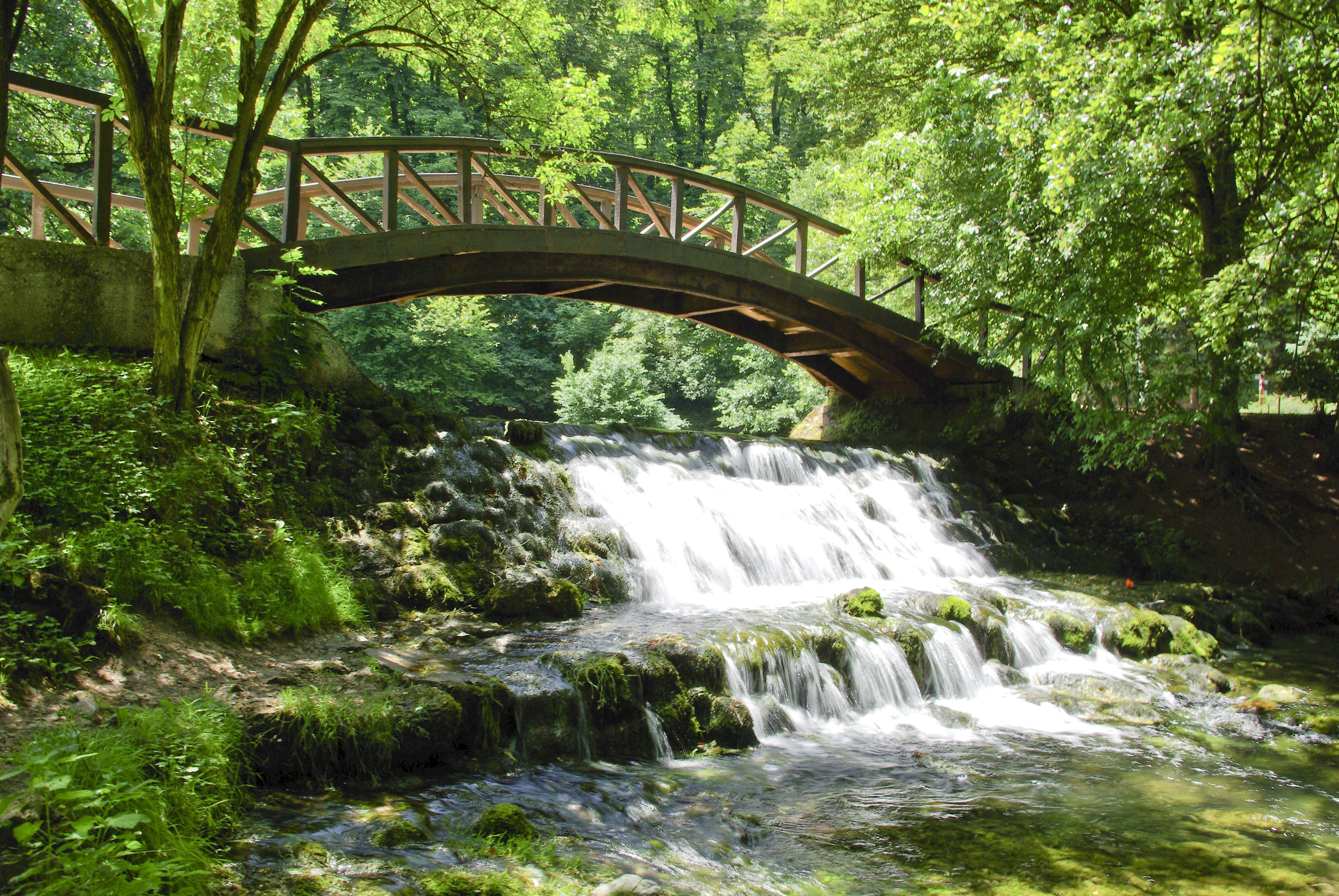
PP4 Vrelo Bosne

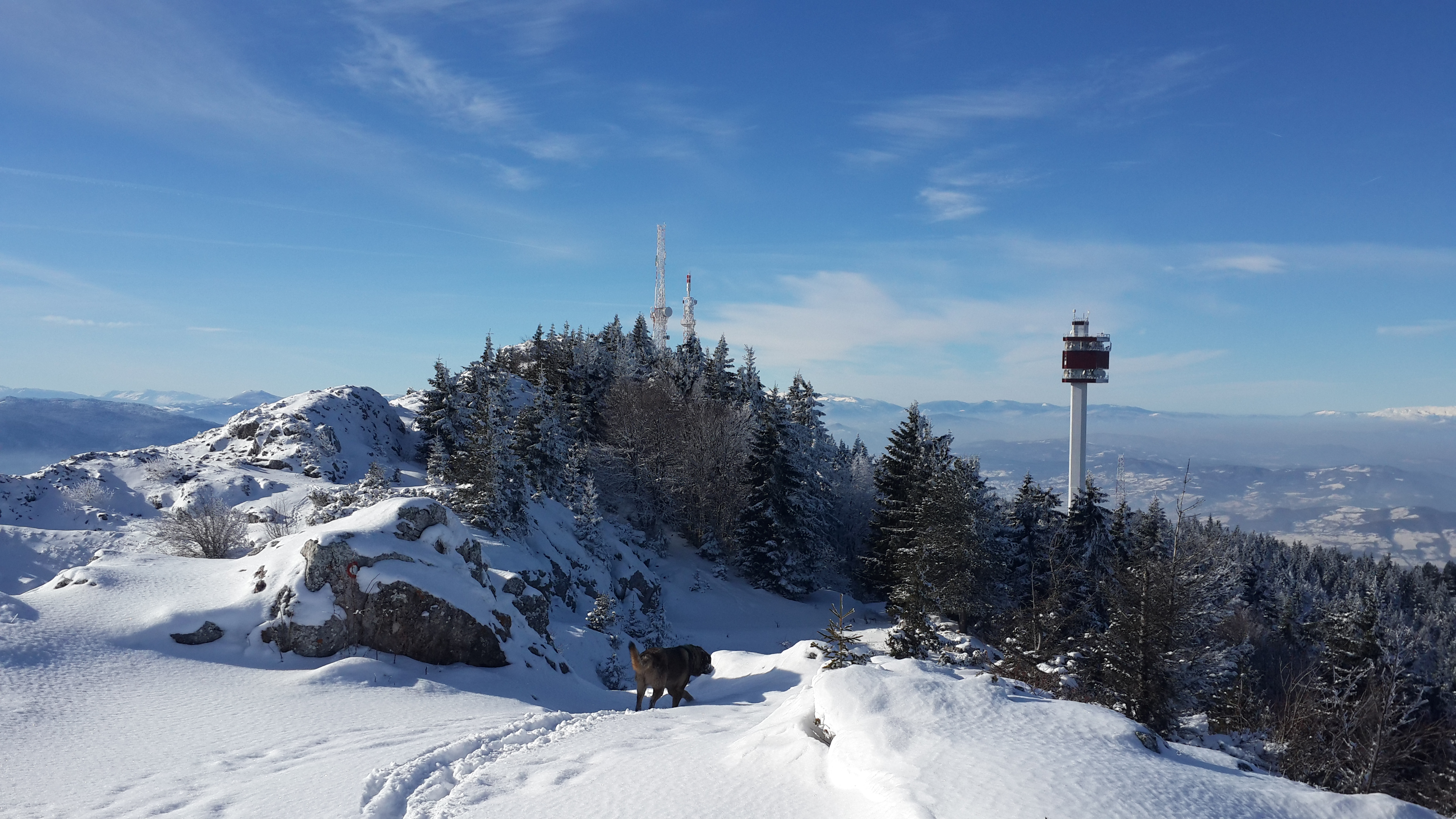
PP5 Trebević

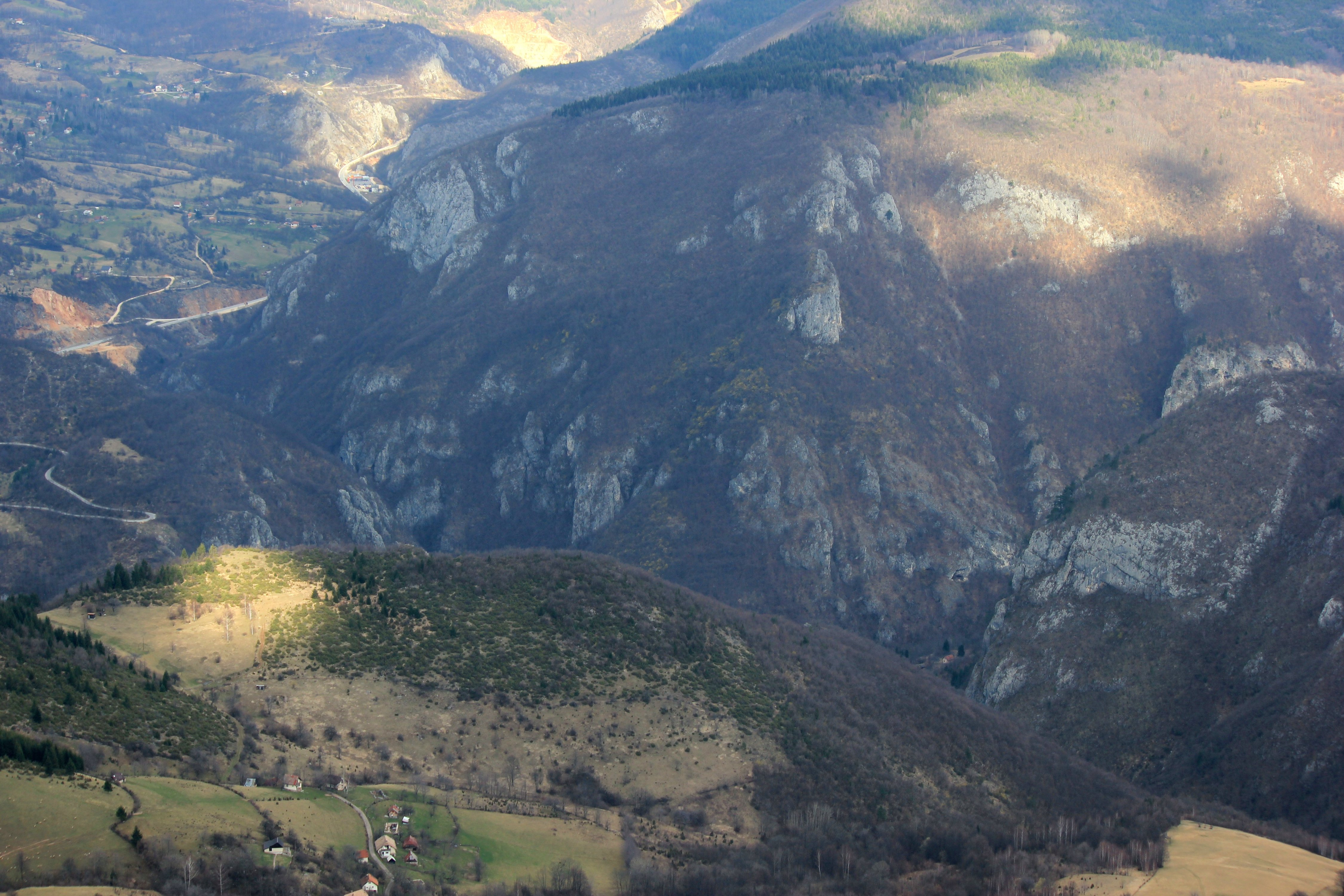
PP6 Miljacka Canyon

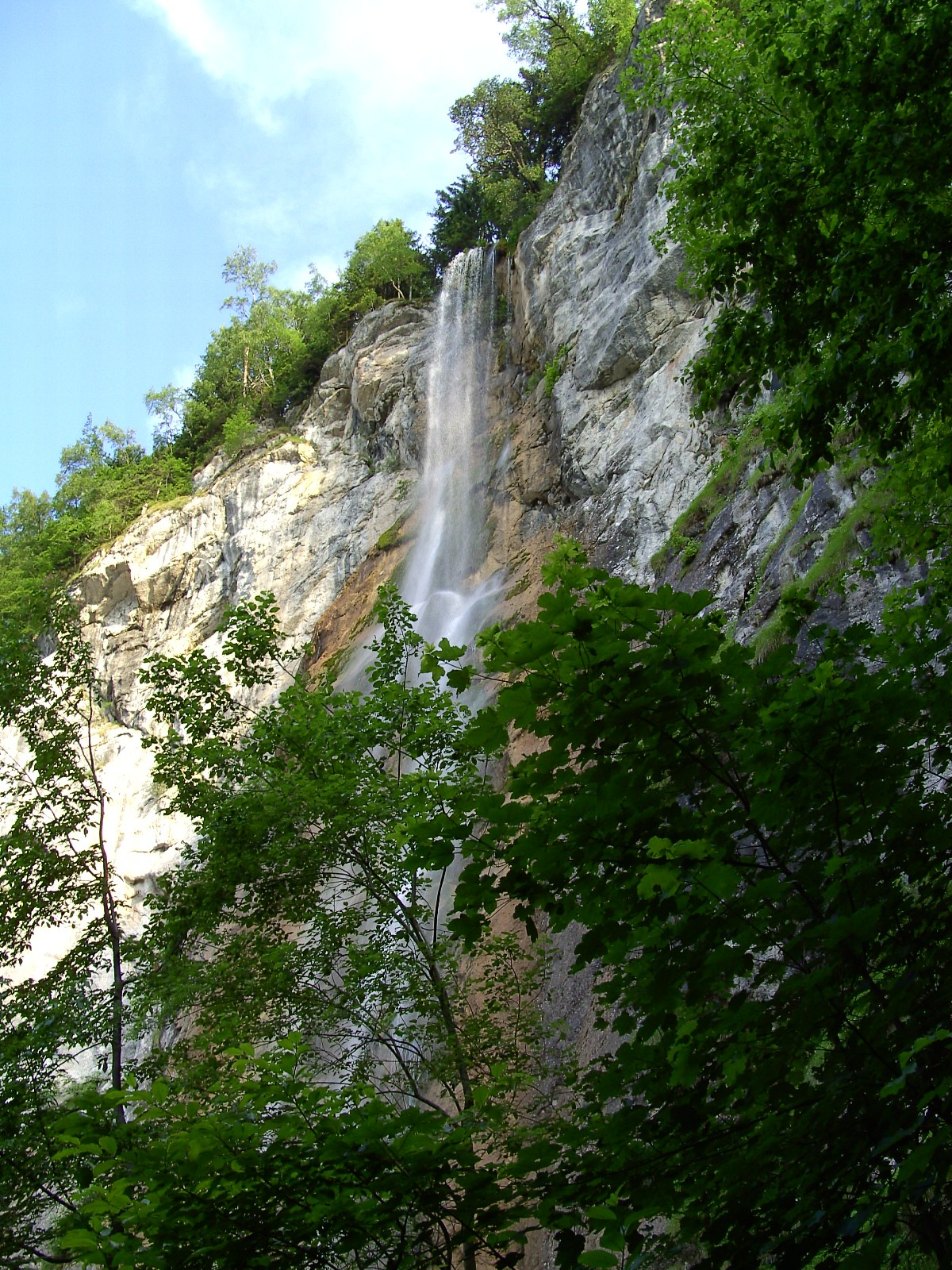
PP7 Skakavac

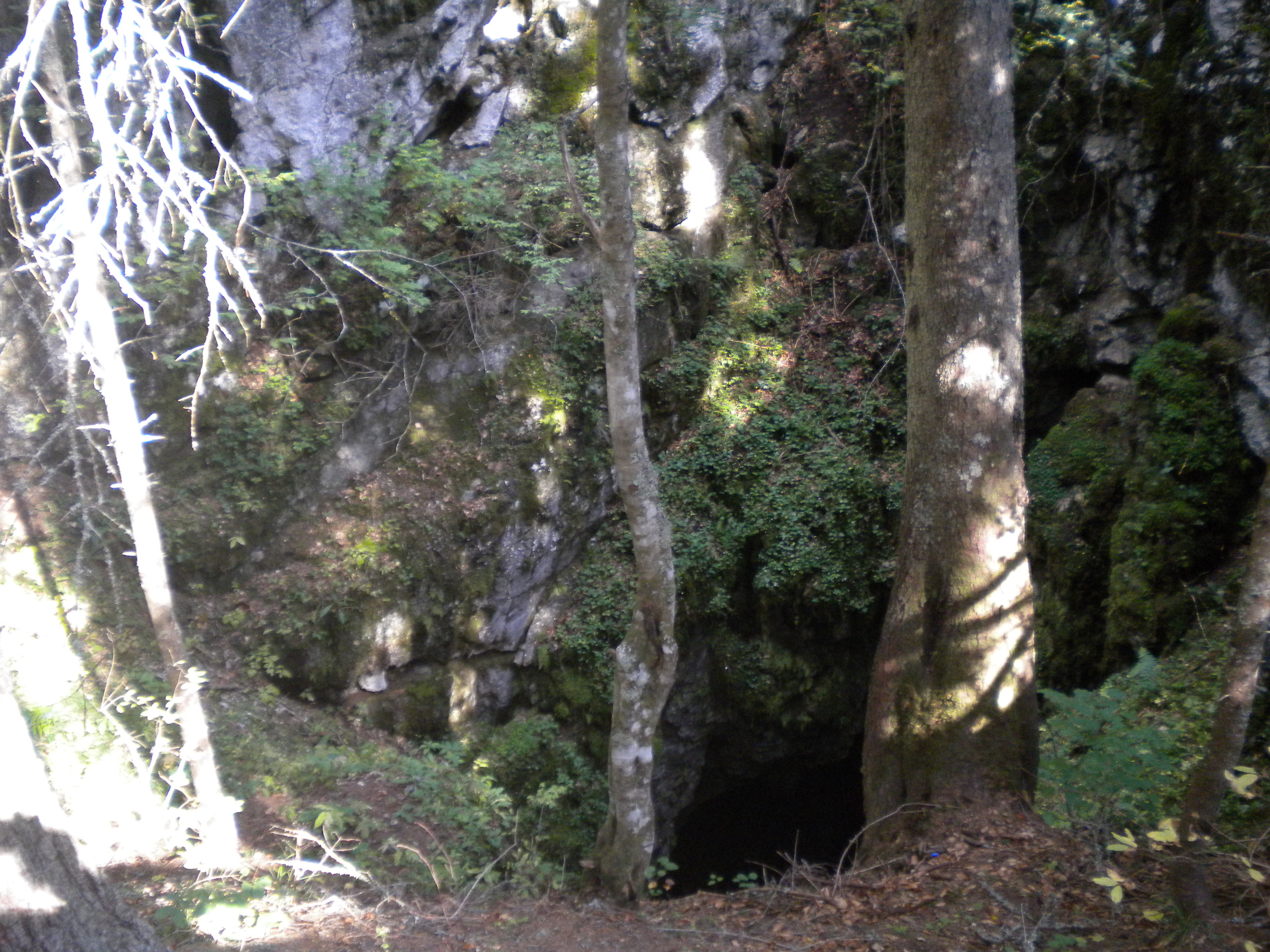
PP8 Bijambare

== Areas proposed for protection ==
Following are areas proposed for protection or in procedure of being established as a protection zones of appropriate categorization:

- Prenj-Čvrsnica-Čabulja-Vran National Park with Blidinje Nature Park
- Igman-Bjelašnica-Treskavica-Visočica with Rakitnica Canyon National Park

== See also ==
- List of National Monuments of Bosnia and Herzegovina
- List of World Heritage Sites in Bosnia and Herzegovina
