= Skakavac (Sarajevo) =

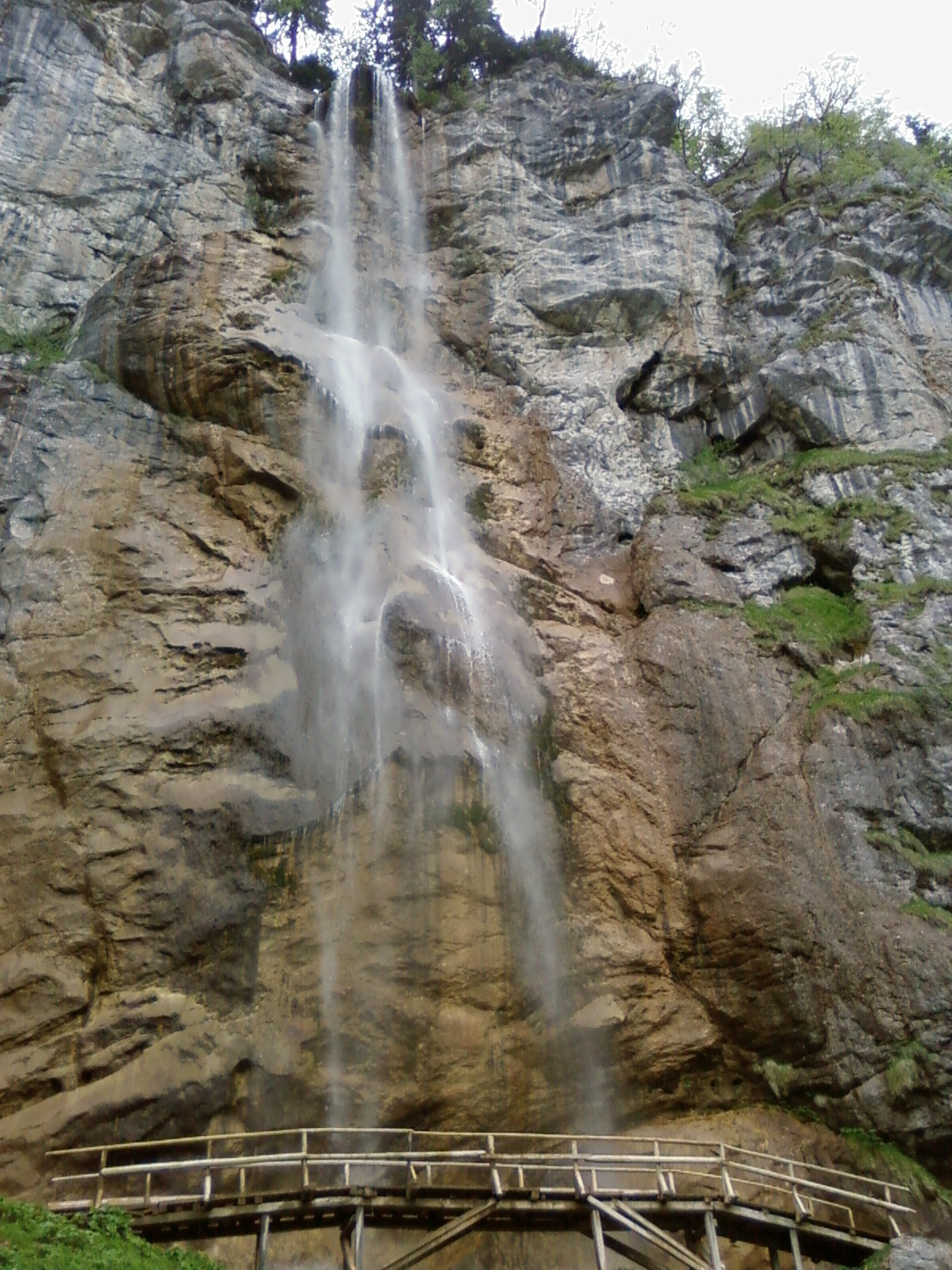
- Interactive map of Skakavac
- Location: Sarajevo Canton, Bosnia and Herzegovina
- Coordinates: 43°56′55″N 18°26′56″E
- Elevation: 980 metres (3,220 ft)
- Total height: 98 metres (322 ft)
- Watercourse: Skakavac

Skakavac Nature Preserve
- IUCN category III (natural monument or feature)
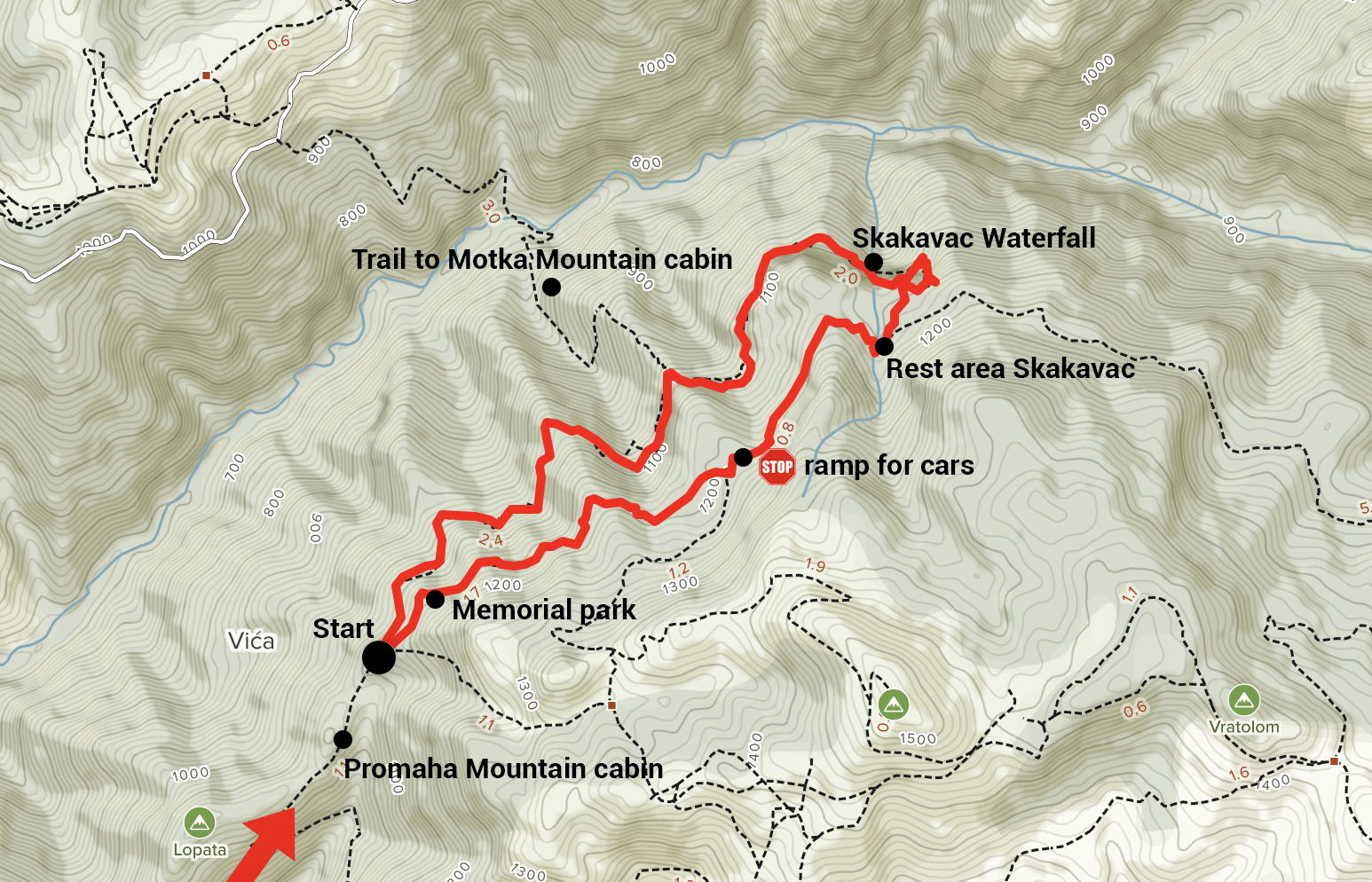
- Round tour trail to Skakavac waterfall.

- Location within Bosnia and Herzegovina
- Location: Bosnia and Herzegovina
- Nearest city: Sarajevo
- Coordinates: 43°56′55″N 18°26′56″E
- Area: 14.31 km^{2} (5.53 sq mi)
- Established: 2002

Skakavac (lit. "grasshopper") is a waterfall in Bosnia and Herzegovina. It is 12 kilometres (7.5 mi) northeast of Sarajevo, above the village of Nahorevo. At 98 metres (322 ft), it is one of the tallest waterfalls in the Balkans and traverses a vertical limestone face. The waterfall freezes in winter into a number of shapes. Part of a stream of the same name, it flows below the peak of the 1,532-metre (5,026 ft) Bukovik into Perak Creek. Vegetation around the waterfall consists of endemic and relict plants. Nearby trails are frequented by mountain bikers and hikers. In 2002, the waterfall and its surroundings were declared a natural monument by the Sarajevo Canton government.

== Tourist attraction ==
The main tourist attraction of the park - Skakavac waterfall - can be reached by trail. The trailhead is accessible by bus or car and by foot. Visitors can travel to the waterfall trailhead from Nahorevo or hike from Sarajevo through Nahorevo and the Skakavac Nature Preserve. The waterfall may also be reached by vehicle, with rest areas available along the trail.

== Gallery ==
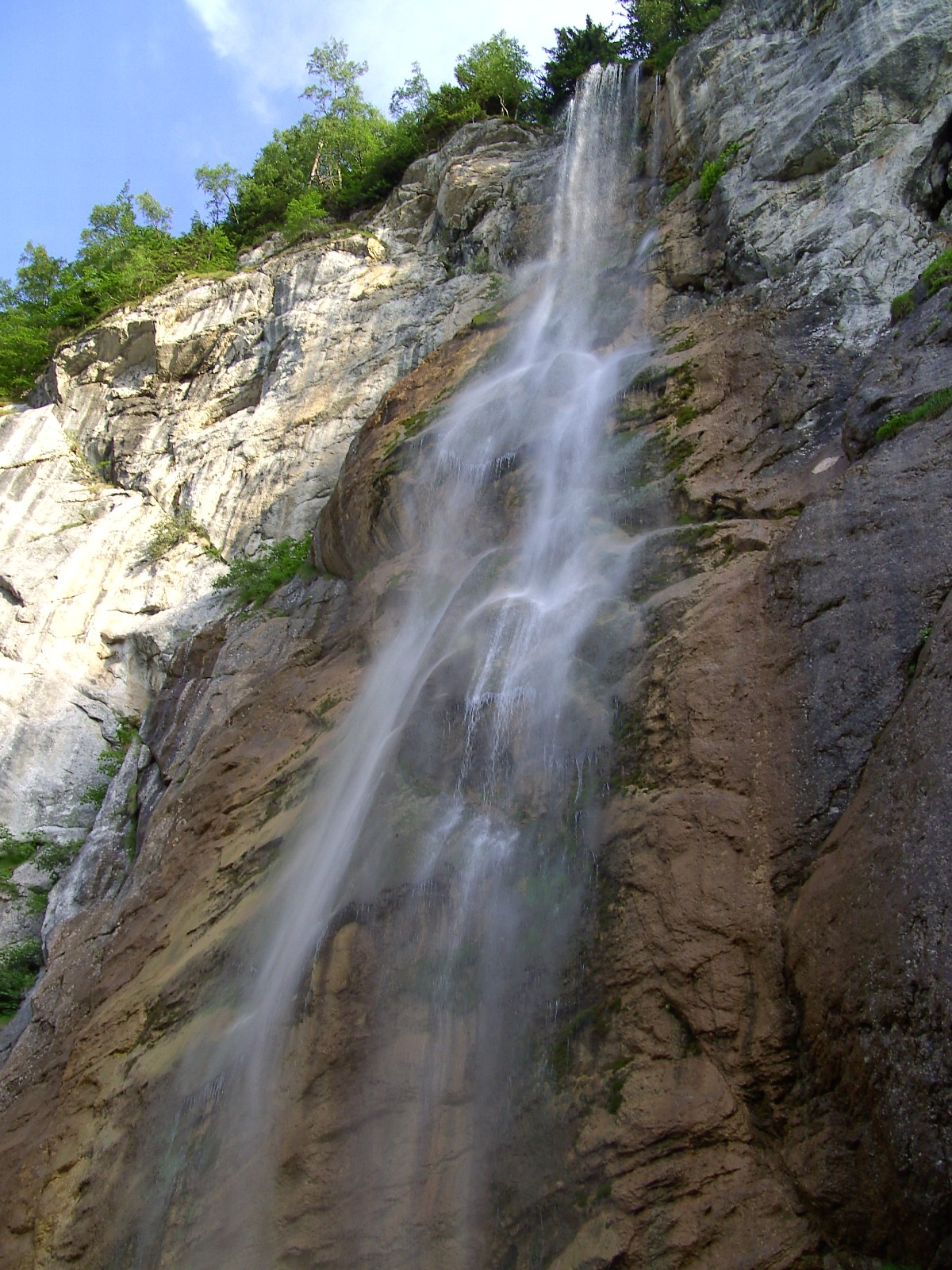
Waterfall

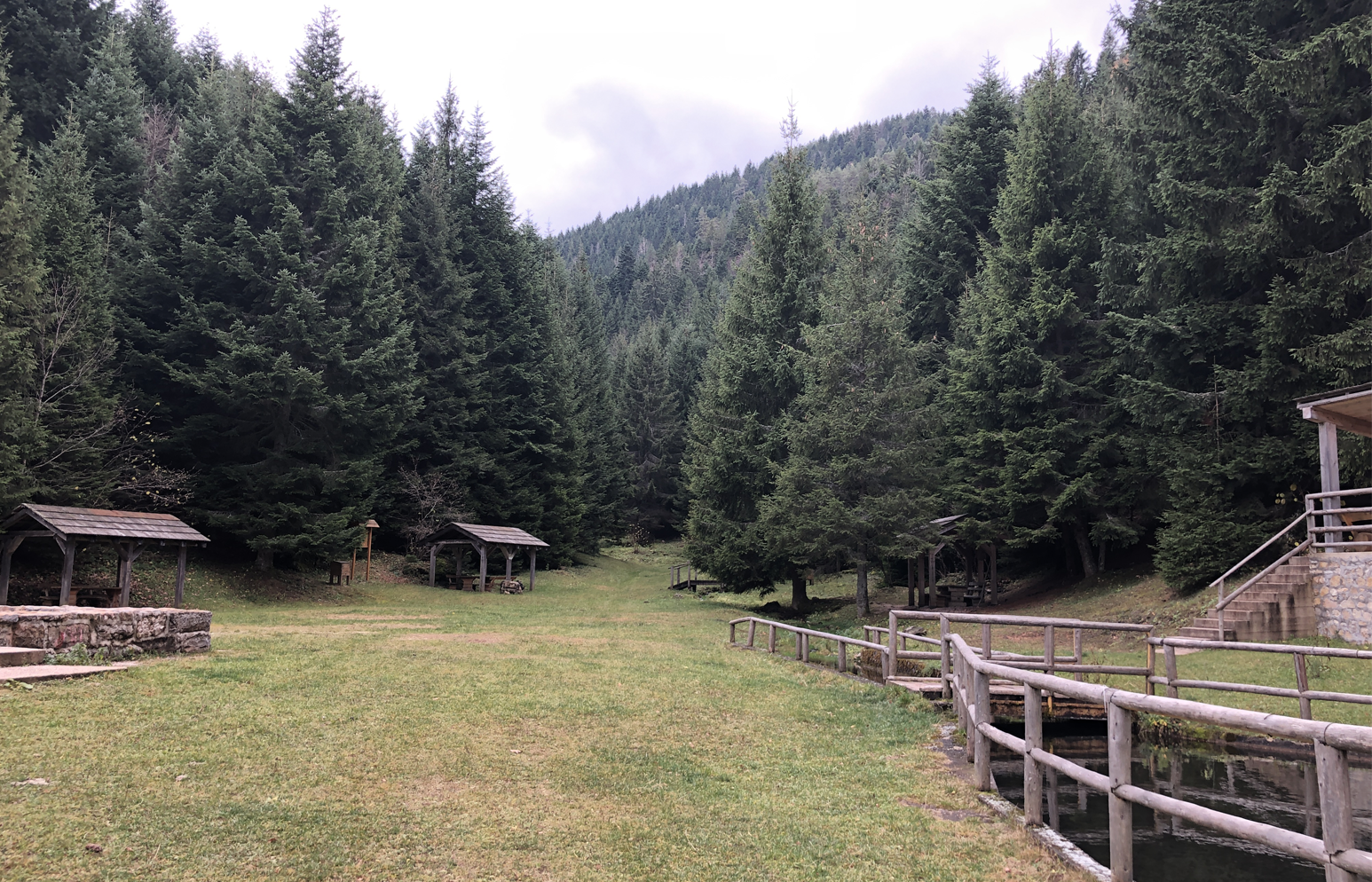
Rest area above the waterfall

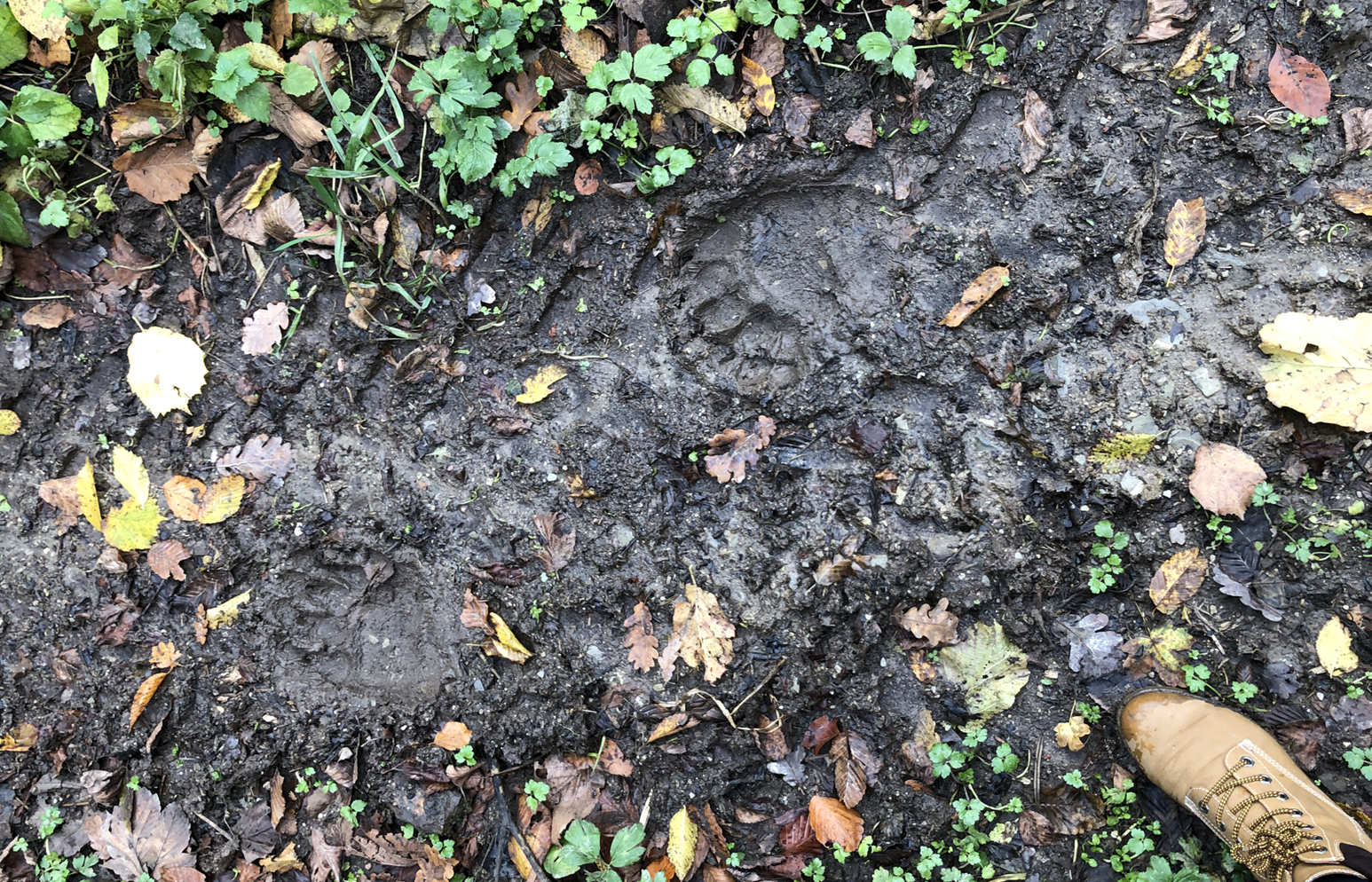
Bear pawprints on the trail to Motka

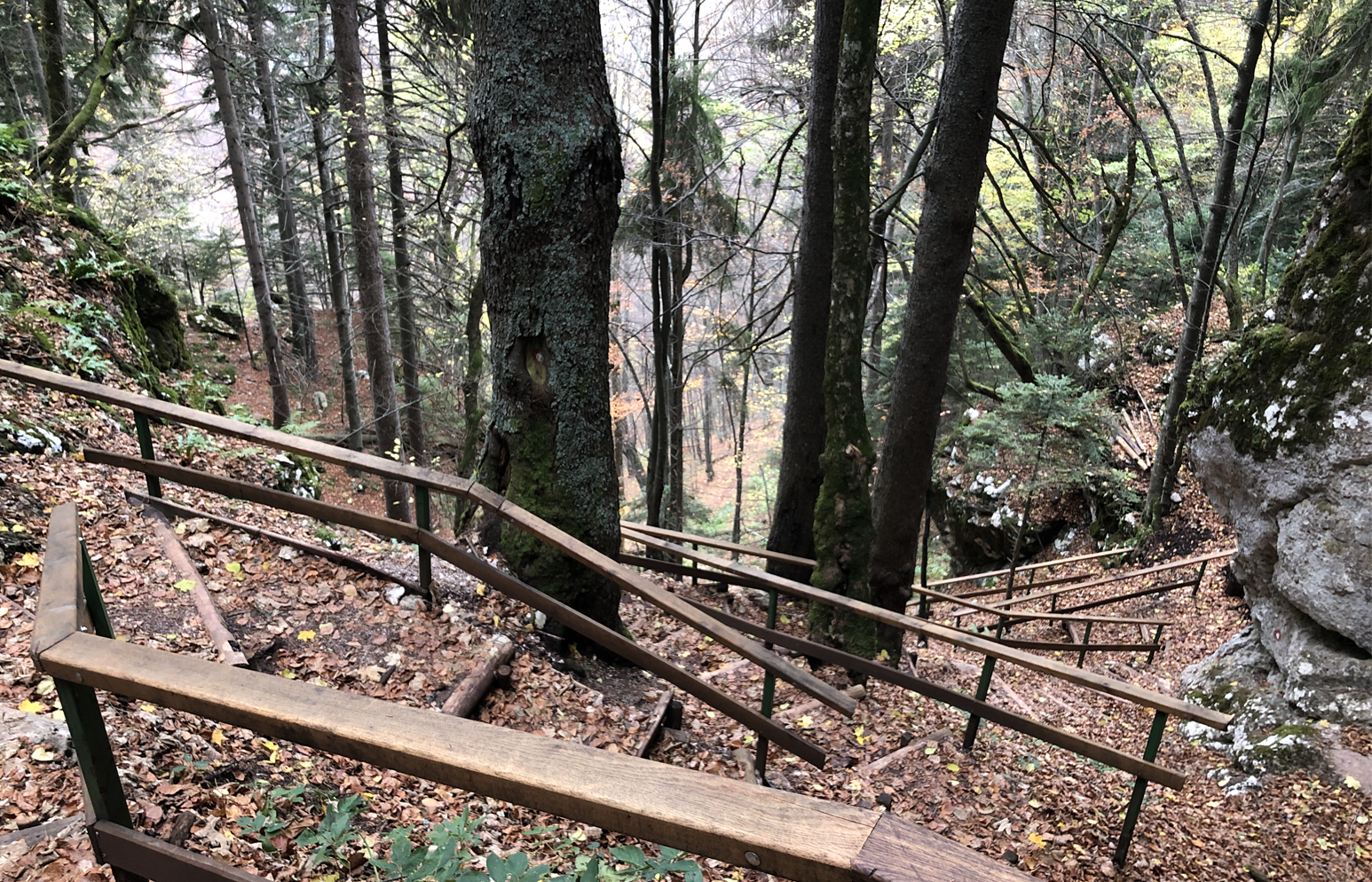
Trail from the waterfall

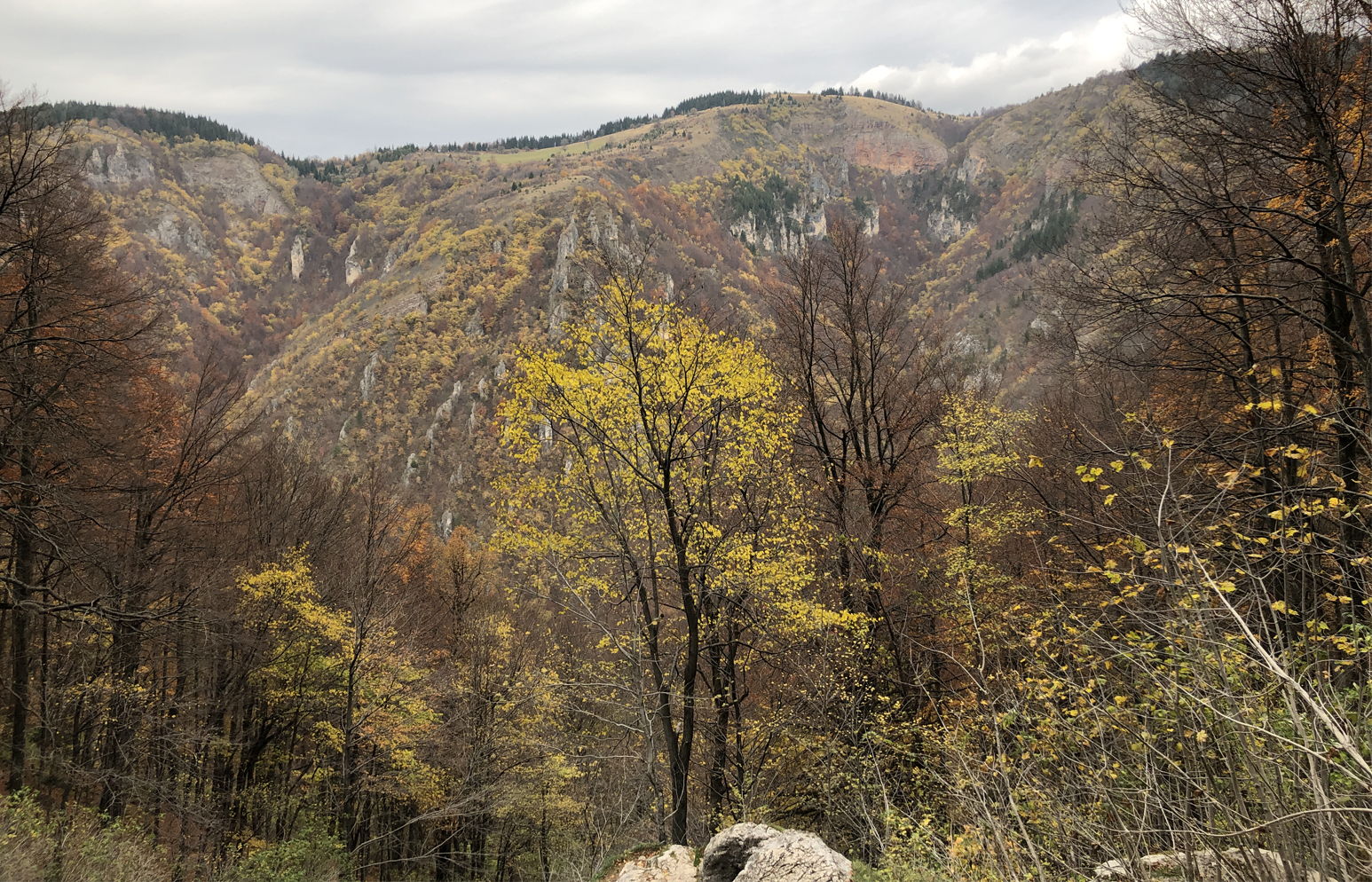
View from the waterfall

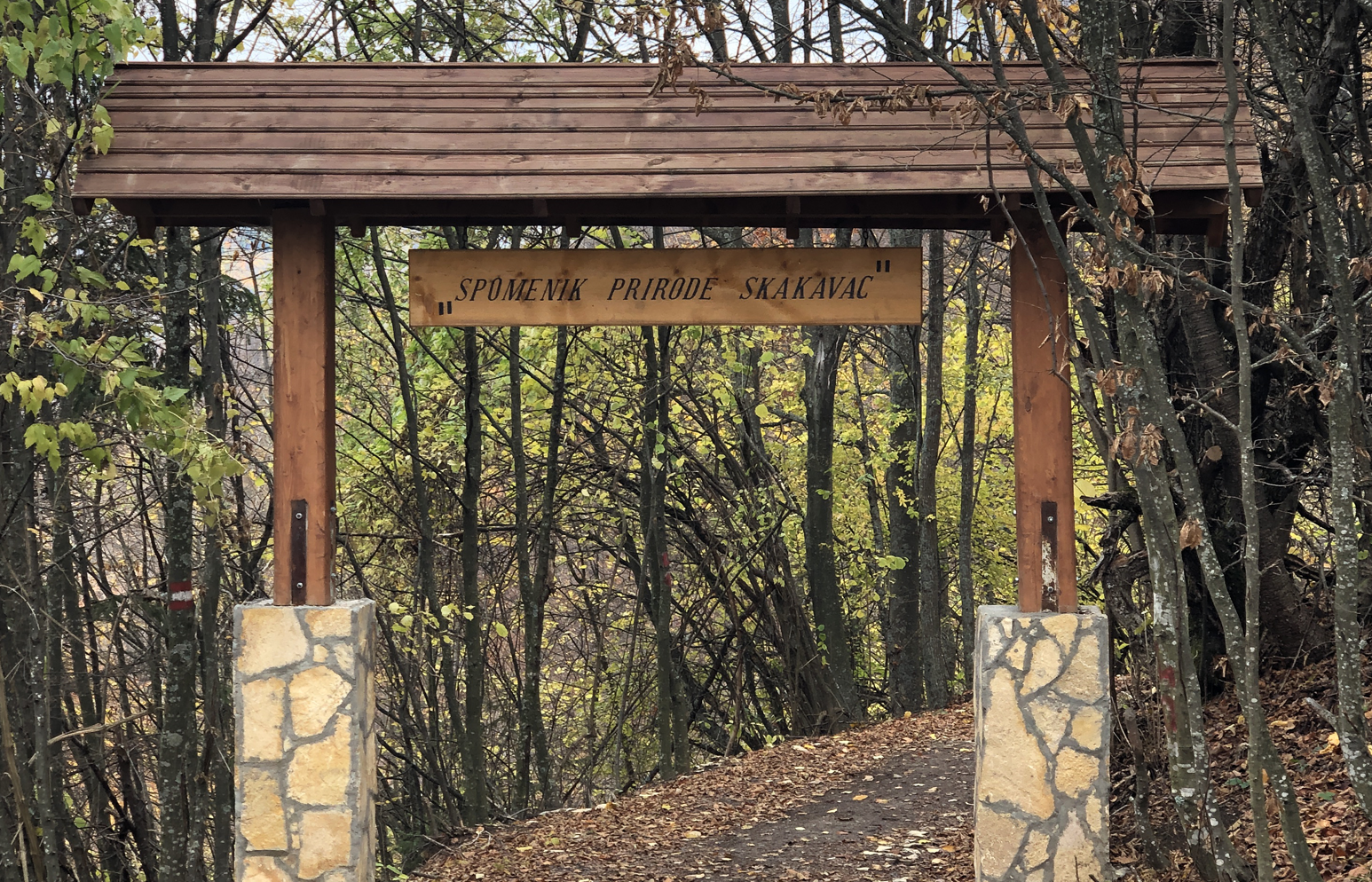
Entrance to Nature Preserve Skakavac

== See also ==
- List of waterfalls
- Skakavac Waterfall, Perućica, another waterfall in Bosnia
