= Drina National Park =

National park in Bosnia and Herzegovina

- IUCN category II (national park)
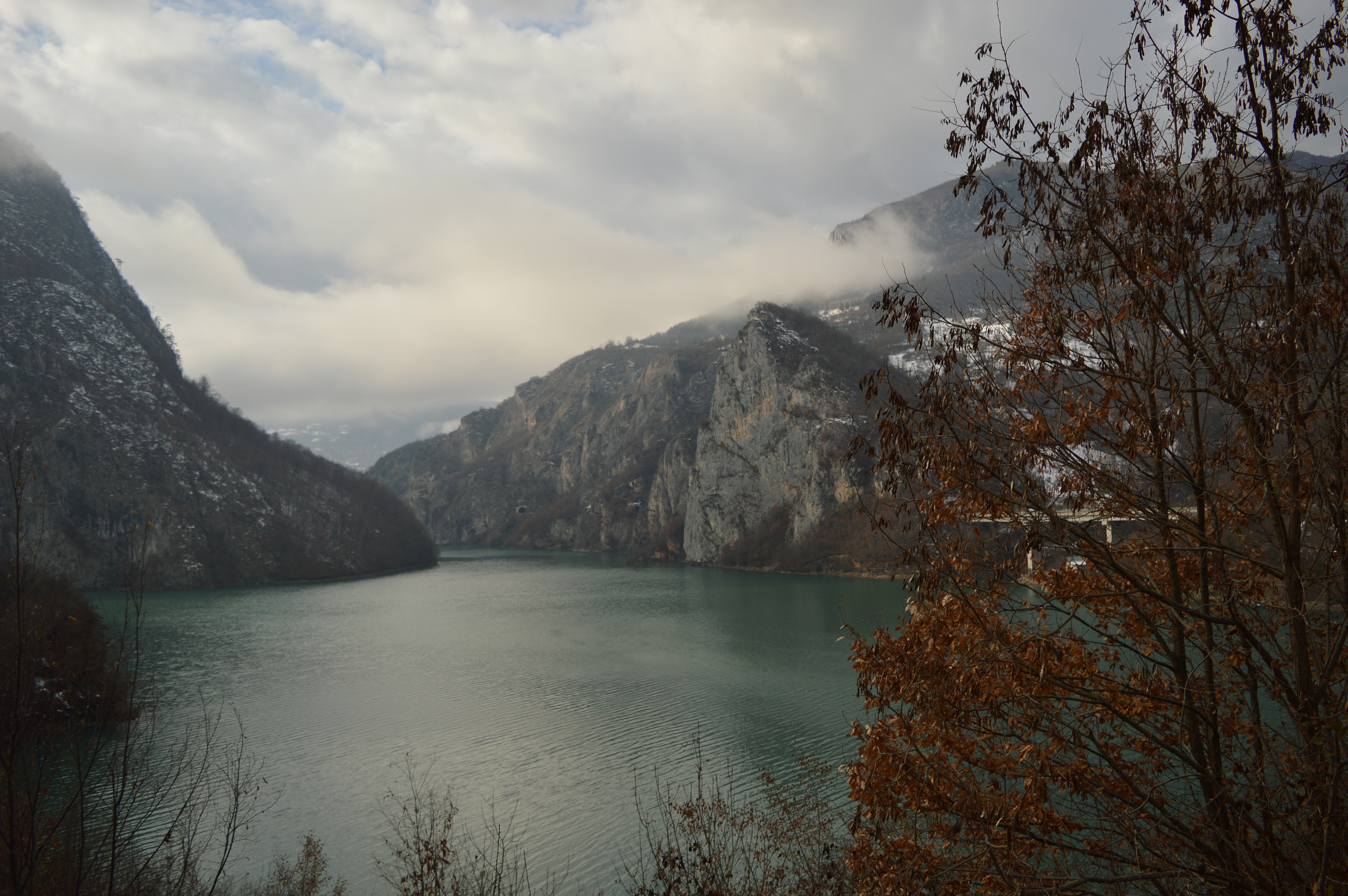

- Location within Bosnia and Herzegovina
- Location: Bosnia and Herzegovina
- Nearest city: Srebrenica
- Coordinates: 44°00′01″N 19°21′00″E
- Area: 63.15 km^{2} (24.38 sq mi)
- Established: 2017
- Website: www.npdrina.com

Drina National Park is the fourth national park in Bosnia and Herzegovina, and the third in Republika Srpska. It was founded in 2017. The nearest town is Srebrenica. It is located on the other side of the Drina in relation to Tara National Park in Serbia.

== Geomorphology ==
Geomorphological specifics are related to the chine — canyon valley of the Drina river and its tributaries. The gorge — canyon valley of the Drina is most pronounced at the mouth Crni Potok, where the maximum depth of the canyon is 976 meters. Crni potok has a spring at more than 1,100 meters above sea level and after only 6 km of flow to the mouth of the Drina overcomes a fall of more than 800 meters.

== Biodiversity ==
Plant species characteristic of the Drina National Park are Serbian spruce (Picea omorika), endemic species of brown knapweed (Centaurea jacea), which with Edraianthus jugoslavicus, Daphne malyana and Sesleria tenuifolia builds communities of endemic character. Particularly important animal species are brown bear (Ursus arctos), chamois (Rupicapra rupicapra) and golden eagle (Aquila chrysaetos).

== History ==
Historically, the National Park belongs to a geographical area called Osat, which was once an administrative unit. In the last century, the Osat area was known for its excellent builders - dungeons and specific architectural endeavors, about which Ivo Andrić wrote in the short story "Osatičani". Numerous buildings (log cabins) in Serbia and Bosnia and Herzegovina testify to their skill. In mutual communication, the builders used the "Osijek language" locally known as the Banja Luka or Dundjer language.

In the area of this park there is Skelani Archaeological Site spread over several localities. It has been declared a National Monument of Bosnia and Herzegovina, a consists of Roman settlement, two early Christian basilicas, graves within it and movable finds located in the National Museum in Sarajevo and the Archaeological Museum "Roman Municipality" in Skelani.

== See also ==
- List of protected areas of Bosnia and Herzegovina
