= Kozara National Park =

National Park in Bosnia and Herzegovina

- IUCN category II (national park)
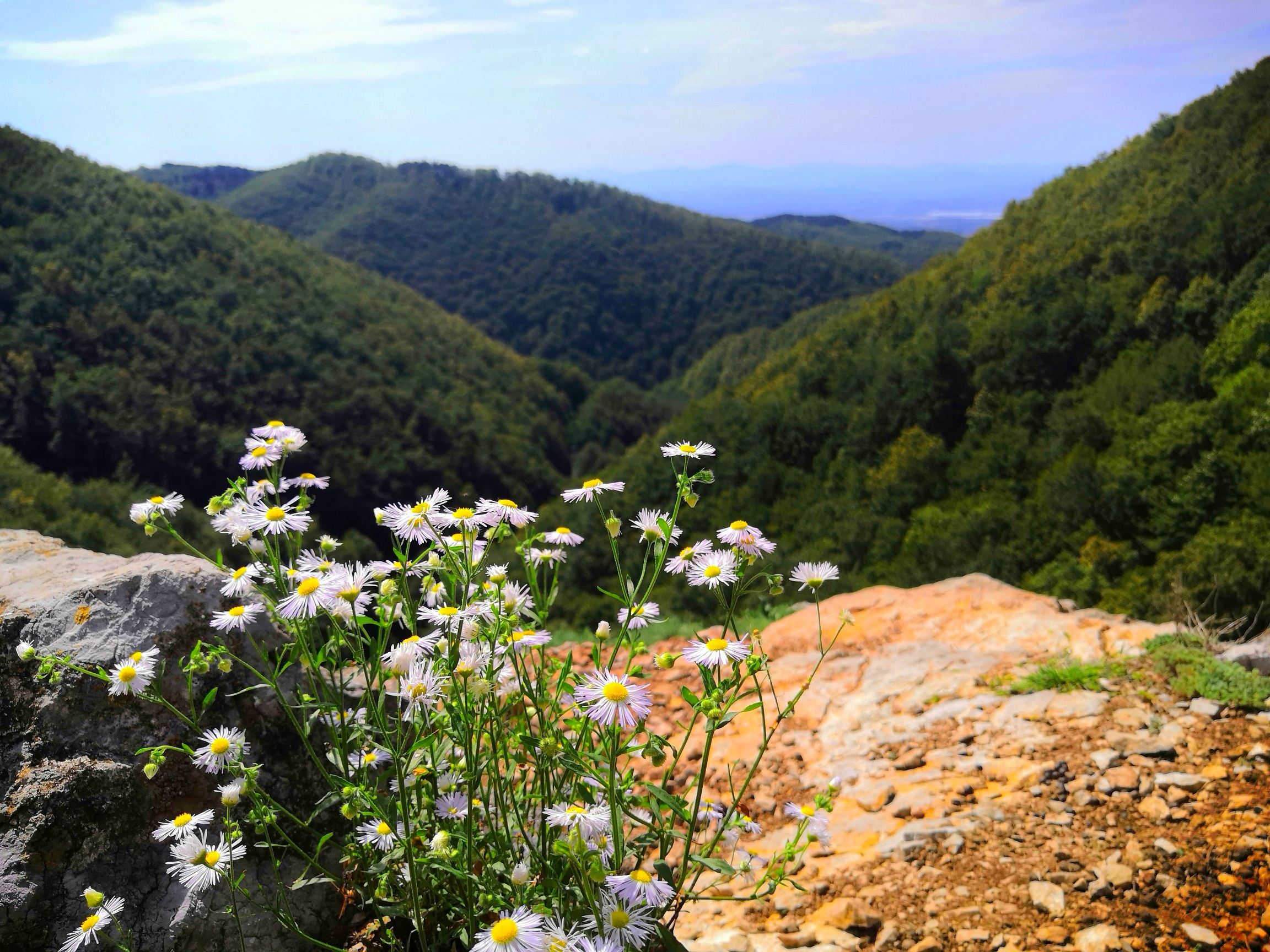

- Location within Bosnia and Herzegovina
- Location: Bosnia and Herzegovina
- Nearest city: Prijedor
- Coordinates: 45°00′30″N 16°53′30″E
- Area: 39.08 km^{2} (15.09 sq mi)
- Established: 6 April 1967
- Governing body: http://www.npkozara.com/

Kozara National Park (Serbo-Croatian: Национални парк Козара, Nacionalni park Kozara) is a national park in Bosnia and Herzegovina that was proclaimed a protected national forest in 1967 by Josip Broz Tito. It is situated between the rivers Una, Sava, Sana and Vrbas, in the Republika Srpska entity of Bosnia and Herzegovina.

The Kozara Marathon, also known as Kozara Ultra Trail, is held in the Kozara National Park. The park is also the site for Kozara Grand Prix, a mountain bike race that takes place in the wilderness of the park. The race is part of the Union Cycliste Internationale calendar.

A smaller part of the park is designated for nature lovers. Walking, hiking, biking and herb picking are among the many activities in Kozara.

== History and cultural significance ==
Kozara National Park was established in 1967 in the vicinity of Prijedor. The area gained historical significance during World War II as a site of organized partisan resistance against occupying forces. In 1972, a monument was erected to honour nearly 35,000 victims from the wider region, followed by a museum in 1974 and a memorial wall listing 9,864 names of partisan fighters who died in the area. Unlike other Yugoslav memorial sites, Kozara was primarily presented as a space of suffering, liberation, and local connection to the partisan movement rather than having all-Yugoslav significance.

After the Bosnian War (1992–1995), the memorial complex was partially abandoned but the main monument remained undamaged. In 1993, a cross was placed at the entrance to the memorial area, dedicated to Kozara's victims from World War II. Since 2012, the park has been governed by a specific law enacted by Republika Srpska. While historical commemorations continue to be held annually on July 4th to mark the battle's anniversary, the park administration has increasingly emphasized the area's natural values and recreational opportunities, developing numerous hiking trails, cycling routes, and educational paths to diversify its tourism appeal.

== Tourism development ==
The development of tourism in Kozara National Park has evolved considerably since its establishment. While initially focused on commemorative and ideological tourism related to World War II, the park has increasingly emphasized its natural values and recreational opportunities, particularly since the 2000s. After the Bosnian War (1992–1995), park management began shifting its focus. According to park management, visitor patterns changed as tourists began to seek more recreational activities beyond the memorial sites. In response to changing visitor expectations, the park administration has developed approximately 300 kilometres of trails, including hiking paths, cycling routes, and educational trails. Facilities for picnics, recreation, and fitness have been established throughout the park.

The park's natural predisposition for tourism is significant, with 88% of its 3,907.54 ha area covered in forests and forest soil, complemented by glades, brooks, and cultural monuments that create conditions for outdoor relaxation and recreation. Scientific assessments have found that 41% of the park is suitable or very suitable for recreation, with the most favourable areas located in the central, northern, eastern, northeastern, and southeastern parts of the park.

While the commemoration of the Battle of Kozara remains an important annual event, the park now hosts various sporting and recreational events throughout the year. These include the Kozara Marathon (also known as Kozara Ultra Trail), mountain biking competitions that are part of the UCI calendar, alpine skiing, and winter sports festivals. The park's recreational potential is further enhanced by its proximity to several urban centres (Banja Luka 56 km, Prijedor 24 km, Gradiška 56 km), good road network, dining facilities, and existing tourist infrastructure. The Kozara National Park is certified by the EUROPARC Federation as an IUCN Protected Area Category V, confirming its recognized value for both conservation and recreation.

Tourism infrastructure within the park underwent privatization by 2016, with most facilities now operated by private entities rather than the park administration itself. Despite this change in management structure, the park continues to be one of the most significant natural and cultural tourist destinations in Republika Srpska. Based on its natural and cultural resources, tourism development in the park focuses on several forms: mountain tourism, hunting, spa (air-spa) tourism, cultural-historical tourism, scientific research, sports and recreation, gastronomy, picnic tourism, and special interest activities such as bicycling, camping, and mountain climbing.

May 1st (International Workers' Day) has emerged as one of the busiest periods for the park, with up to 10,000 visitors gathering spontaneously for picnics and camping, particularly around Mrakovica. This has prompted the park administration to designate specific areas for these activities to better manage visitor impact and protect the memorial area.

== See also ==
- List of mountains in Bosnia and Herzegovina
- List of national parks of Bosnia and Herzegovina
