= Podštirovnik =

Podštirovnik Подштировник
- Village
- Location within Bosnia and Herzegovina
- Coordinates: 42°34′49″N 18°27′35″E
- Country: Bosnia and Herzegovina
- Entity: Republika Srpska
- Municipality: Trebinje
- Time zone: UTC+1 (CET)
  - Summer (DST): UTC+2 (CEST)

Podštirovnik (Serbian Cyrillic: Подштировник) is a village in the municipality of Trebinje, Republika Srpska, Bosnia and Herzegovina. It is the southernmost point of the country.
