= Krčevine, Vareš =

Village in Vareš, Bosnia and Herzegovina

Krčevine
- Village
- Location within Bosnia and Herzegovina
- Coordinates: 44.1932538°N 18.4360043°E
- Country: Bosnia and Herzegovina
- Entity: Federation of Bosnia and Herzegovina
- Canton: Zenica-Doboj
- Municipality: Vareš

Area
  - Total: 2.34 sq mi (6.05 km^{2})

Population (2013)
  - Total: 68
  - Density: 29/sq mi (11/km^{2})
- Time zone: UTC+1 (CET)
  - Summer (DST): UTC+2 (CEST)

Krčevine is a village in the municipality of Vareš, Bosnia and Herzegovina.

== Demographics ==
According to the 2013 census, its population was 68.

Ethnicity in 2013
Ethnicity	Number	Percentage
Croats	67	98.5%
Serbs	1	1.5%
Total	68	100%
