= Nahorevo =

- Village
- Interactive map of Nahorevo
- Location within Bosnia and Herzegovina
- Coordinates: 43°55′00″N 18°24′15″E
- Country: Bosnia and Herzegovina
- Entity: Federation of Bosnia and Herzegovina
- Canton: Sarajevo
- Municipality: Centar Sarajevo

Area
  - Total: 2.37 sq mi (6.15 km^{2})

Population (2013)
  - Total: 541
  - Density: 228/sq mi (88.0/km^{2})
- Time zone: UTC+1 (CET)
  - Summer (DST): UTC+2 (CEST)

Nahorevo is a village and a local community (Mjesna zajednica) in the Centar municipality, in the town of Sarajevo, Federation of Bosnia and Herzegovina, Bosnia and Herzegovina.

== Demographics ==
=== Ethnic composition, 1991 census ===
total: 697

- ethnic Muslims - 410 (58.82%)
- Serbs - 282 (40.45%)
- Croats - 2 (0.28%)
- Yugoslavs - 2 (0.28%)
- others and unknown - 1 (0.14%)

According to the 2013 census, its population was 541.

Ethnicity in 2013
Ethnicity	Number	Percentage
Bosniaks	525	97.0%
Serbs	15	2.8%
other/undeclared	1	0.2%
Total	541	100%
