= Krčevine, Vitez =

Krčevine
- Village
- Location within Bosnia and Herzegovina
- Coordinates: 44.165395°N 17.7861974°E
- Country: Bosnia and Herzegovina
- Entity: Federation of Bosnia and Herzegovina
- Canton: Central Bosnia
- Municipality: Vitez

Area
  - Total: 1.34 sq mi (3.48 km^{2})

Population (2013)
  - Total: 888
  - Density: 661/sq mi (255/km^{2})
- Time zone: UTC+1 (CET)
  - Summer (DST): UTC+2 (CEST)

Krčevine is a village in the municipality of Vitez, Bosnia and Herzegovina.

== Demographics ==
According to the 2013 census, its population was 888.

Ethnicity in 2013
Ethnicity	Number	Percentage
Croats	821	92.5%
Bosniaks	51	5.7%
Serbs	4	0.5%
other/undeclared	12	1.4%
Total	888	100%
