= Mehmed Begić =

Bosnian writer

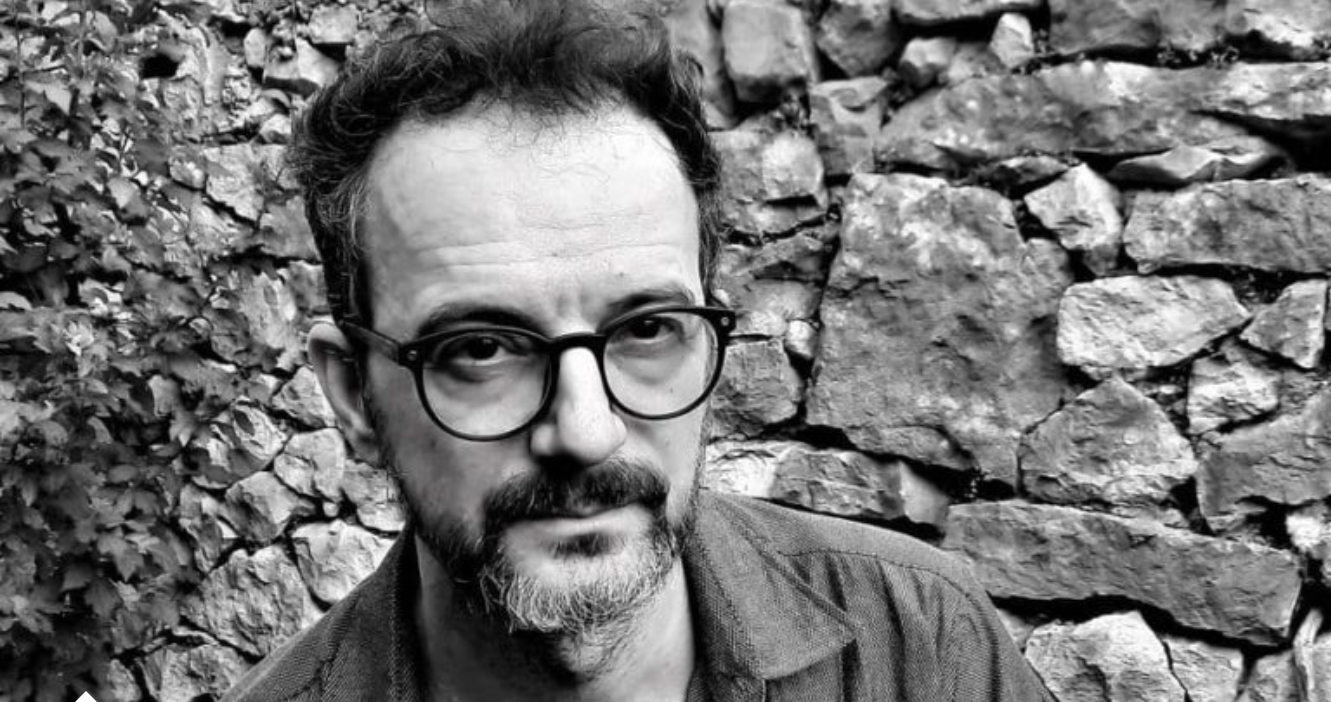
- Mehmed Begić
- Born: 1977 (age 48–49); Čapljina, Bosnia and Herzegovina
- Occupations: poet, translator, collaborator on music projects
- Notable work: Savršen metak u stomak, Opasan čovjek, Predaja
- Website: Official website

Mehmed Begić (born 1977 in Čapljina) is a poet from Bosnia and Herzegovina.

== Biography ==
Born in 1977 in Čapljina,Begić spent his early youth in his hometown, as well as in Mostar and Sarajevo. He is one of the founders and editors of the cultural magazine Kolaps - A guide for urban sleepers (1999–2010).

In 2000, together with Marko Tomaš, Nedim Ćišić, and Veselin Gatalo, he published a joint poetry collection titled L'amore al primo binocolo with the Italian publisher L'Obliqua in Brescia.

Begić is featured in the interview and poetry collection Jer mi smo mnogi by Croatian poet Marko Pogačar. He collaborated with the band Vuneny and singer-songwriter Sanel Marić Mara. He occasionally contributes to online publications such as Žurnal (Sarajevo), Blesok (Skopje), and magazines like Tema (Zagreb). Together with Damir Šodan translates Hispanic poetry in the Divlji detektivi series.

His ongoing cooperation with Sarajevo-based producer and multi-instrumentalist Basheskia, has resulted in several albums. In 2015, the album Savršen metak, blending his poetry and music, was released.

He also participated in the album Iznad tame – Pjesme za Viktora Haru (2023) with the collective Novi odmetnici. All lyrics were written by Begić.

He lived for many years in both Nicaragua and the Dominican Republic. As of 2024, he lives in Madrid.

== Reception ==
Begić’s poetry has been reviewed in regional literary magazines such as Žurnal, Zarez, Novosti, and Oslobođenje.

Writer Semezdin Mehmedinović, in a 2020 afterword published in Žurnal, described Begić’s poetics as "a new identity that resists the established limits of geographical, ethnic, and cultural borders."

Critic Marko Pogačar, writing in the Zagreb-based magazine Zarez, situates the collection Savršeni metak u stomak within the tradition of the Beat Generation, the lyricism of Leonard Cohen, and the minimalist surrealism of Charles Simic.

Saša Ćirić’s review Ritam i aritmija, published on the Novosti portal, places Opasan čovjek in the context of four contemporary Bosnian poets.

In a review for Oslobođenje, critic Đorđe Krajišnik described Opasan čovjek as "a military coup of the soul."

The late Croatian journalist and writer Predrag Lucić published an essay on Begić’s poetry titled “Mehmed Begić’s Razorblade Wreath” in the literary magazine Žurnal.

His work has also appeared in projects supported by international institutions. In 2013, together with Marko Tomaš, he co-authored the anthology Midnight Talks. The book was published as part of the “Little Library” project of the Youth Council of Mostar, with support from the British Council, UN Volunteers, and OKC Abrašević.

Begić’s collection Bebop, recognized regionally, is distributed internationally and is listed by Barnes & Noble.

== Discography ==
- Savršen metak (Basheskia & Edward EQ, Studio Hit, 2015)
- Opasan čovjek (Basheskia, Periskop Records, 2017)
- Seven Lessons with Mehmed Begic (Basheskia & Edward EQ, Podmornica, 2021)
- Kotlina (Taino, 2022)
- Iznad tame – Pjesme za Viktora Haru (Novi odmetnici, 2023)
- Tajni akord (Ivan Škrabe & Mehmed Begić, interstellaR., 2026)

== Bibliography ==
- Čekajući mesara (Alternativni institut, Mostar, 2002)
- Pjesme iz sobe (Frakcija, Split, 2006)
- Savršen metak u stomak (Naklada Mlinarec & Plavić, Zagreb, 2010)
- Знам дека знаеш / Znam da znaš / I Know You Know (Blesok, Skopje, 2012)
- Sitni sati u Managvi (Vrijeme, Zenica, 2015)
- Opasan čovjek (Buybook, Sarajevo/Zagreb, 2016)
- Vrijeme morfina (Kontrast izdavaštvo, Beograd, 2018)
- Pisma iz Paname: detektivski jazz (Red Box, Beograd, 2018)
- Nesvrstane pjesme (Buybook, Sarajevo, 2019)
- Divlja tama (Treći Trg, Beograd, 2020)
- Pauk u meskalinu (VBZ, Zagreb, 2021)
- Bebop / Hipnoze (Meandar Zagreb 2021 / LOM, Beograd 2019)
- Predaja (Buybook, Sarajevo, 2022)
- Autokino (Buybook, Sarajevo, 2026)

== Collaborative poetry collections ==
- L’Amore Al Primo Binocolo (Brescia, 1999) w/ Nedim Ćisić, Marko Tomaš & Veselin Gatalo
- Tri puta trideset i tri jednako (Mostar, 2000) w/ Ćisić & Tomaš
- Film (Mostar, 2001) w/ Lukasz Szopa
- Ponoćni razgovori (Mostar, 2013) w/ Marko Tomaš

== Translations ==
- Moj život u umjetnosti (Leonard Cohen), Alternativni institut, Mostar, 2003
- Smrt u Tangeru: izbor iz poezije (Leopoldo María Panero), PPM Enklava, Belgrade, 2021 (co-translated with Damir Šodan)
