= Esad Hećimović =

Bosnian journalist (1963–2017)

Esad Hećimović Есад Хећимовић
- Born: 14 July 1963; Zenica, SR Bosnia and Herzegovina, SFR Yugoslavia
- Died: 30 April 2017 (aged 53); Zenica, Bosnia and Herzegovina
- Resting place: City cemetery "Prašnice" Zenica
- Occupation: Investigative journalist
- Known for: Islamism and Islamic terrorism in the Balkans
- Notable work: "Garibi - Mujahideens in Bosnia 1992-1999"
- Spouse: Selma Hećimović
- Children: Hena Hećimović

Esad Hećimović (Serbo-Croatian Cyrillic: Есад Хећимовић; 14 July 1963 – 30 April 2017) was a Bosnian investigative journalist and political analyst. At the time of his death, he was working as the Editor-in-chief at OBN TV Station in Sarajevo. He was one of the Founders and Board Members of the European Centre for Press and Media Freedom. Hećimović has worked with a number of Western journalists and media outlets, including some Pulitzer Prize winners on crossborder investigations through the past 20 years. He was awarded for his contribution to investigative journalism by SEEMO and Central European Initiative in 2009. In 2011, he was named as The Journalist of the Year in Bosnia and Herzegovina.

He wrote a book, Garibi: mudžahedini u BiH 1992-1999 (Garibi:Mujahideens in Bosnia 1992-1999), which reveals crimes committed by the Bosnian mujahideen.

== Education ==
Esad Hećimović attained a Bachelor's degree in philosophy and sociology at the Faculty of Philosophy, at the University of Sarajevo.

== Career ==
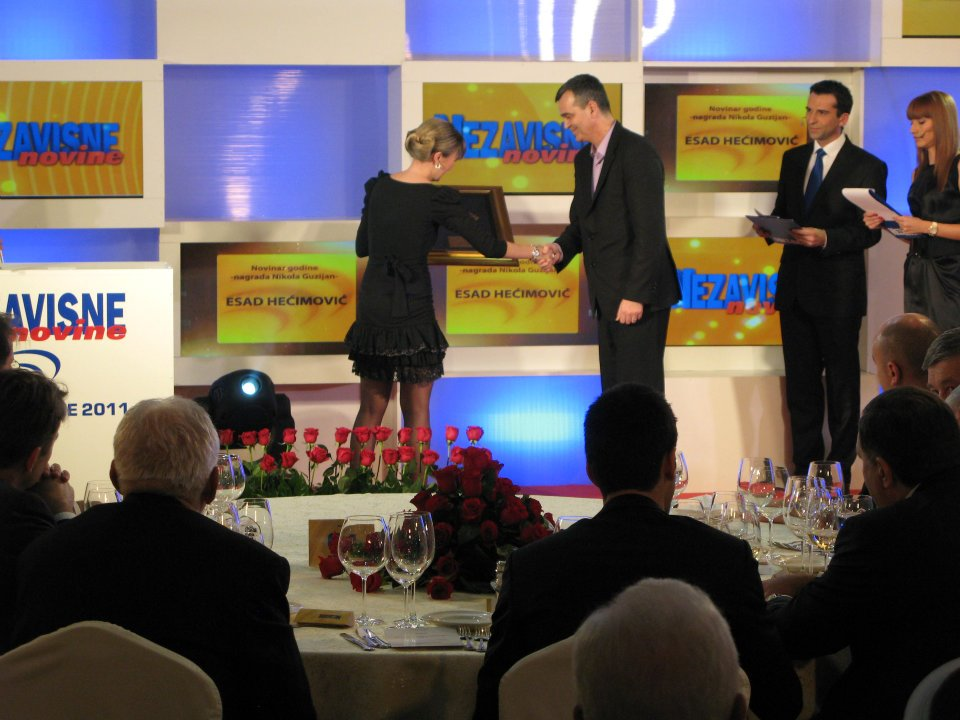
Esad Hecimovic accepting the Journalist of the Year Award in Banja Luka

Hećimović began his career as a correspondent for Večernje novosti, a high circulation Belgrade-based newspaper. From 1991 to 1992, he was a reporter for Muslimanski Glas, a Sarajevo-based weekly. From 1992 to 1995 he was Political Analyst during wartime for Central Office and Main Board of SDA political party. He also worked as an analyst for Ljiljan, a weekly newspaper.

From 1998 to 2010 he was an Investigative journalist for BH Dani magazine. In 2011, he was Deputy editor in chief at Oslobođenje.

In 2012 he worked as a Deputy editor in chief at Dani.

In 2015 he was a Founding Member at European Center for Press and Media Freedom.

At the time of his death, he was working as the Editor-in-chief at OBN TV in Sarajevo.

== Awards and distinctions ==
Year	Award	Organization
2002	ProMedia Anti-Corruption Fellowship	IREX
2011	Best Journalist of the Year 2011 (Nikola Guzijan Award)	Nezavisne novine
2012	European of the Year 2012	European movement in BiH
