= Marko Tomaš =

Bosnian poet (born 1978)

- Born: 19 December 1978 (age 47); Ljubljana, Slovenia
- Education: Bosnian language and literature
- Writing career
- Language: Bosnian language
- Genres: poetry, prose
- Notable works: “Ivica Osim – Utakmice života, biografija”, "Pismo Venjički"
- Notable awards: Farah Tahirbegović Award, Super Cyber Story Award
- Website: penbih.ba/clanovi/marko-tomas

Marko Tomaš (born 19 December 1978) is a Bosnian poet, essayist, and journalist.

== Biography ==
He attended primary school in Mostar, Bosnia and Herzegovina, and Kljajićevo in Vojvodina, Serbia. He then finished high school in Sombor. Returning to Mostar, he enrolled in full-time law studies and the study of Bosnian language and literature. After two years, he interrupted his studies and, along with his friends, founded the Alternative Institute, an association dedicated to multimedia art projects. He also co-founded the literature magazine Kolaps together with Mehmed Begić, Nedim Ćišić, and others, and the publishing house Kolaps Book Production, where he served as editor. He ran the cult Split bookstore UTOPIA. From 2001 to 2003, he resided in Sarajevo temporarily. He often changed his place of residence, so he also lived in Sarajevo, Zagreb, Belgrade, Split and many other cities throughout the former Yugoslavia. He currently lives in Mostar, where he serves as the spokesman and leader of the OKC Abrašević club. In 2017, he signed the Declaration on the Common Language of the Croats, Serbs, Bosniaks and Montenegrins.

== Literary work ==
He is one of the founding editors of the magazine and publishing house Kolaps. He published poetry and prose in Bosnian and Herzegovinian, Croatian, and Serbian periodicals, as well as newspaper articles and essays in Dani, Glas Istre, and Feral Tribune. He publishes diary entries, essays, and political and sports commentary on the online portals Žurnal.ba and Lupiga.com, as well as in the magazine Urban Magazin from Sarajevo. He won the Super Cyber Story Award for storytelling and the Farah Tahirbegović Award for his engagement in the culture of Bosnia and Herzegovina.

Motifs and his writing style are described by his publisher as follows: "What distinguishes his work, regardless of the form and genre, is honesty. Constant life reconsideration, unpretentiousness, strong emotions, various faces of love, melancholy, war, and the colors of everyday life - these are the characteristics of his poetry and prose. With his poetry, Marko lives a life outside the prescribed rules."

Compared to early Leonard Cohen, he is described as a "poet of rare sensuality and emotional refinement with a refined bohemian touch."

He is one of the most successful and most popular contemporary poets from the Balkans. His poems have been translated into Italian, French, Polish, German, Slovenian, English and Albanian.

His poem is included in one of the more recent theater productions of Dušan Kovačević's play Balkanski špijun, performed at Raša Plaović, the stage of the National Theater in Belgrade.

One of his most famous works is the poem Pismo Venjički, inspired by the poem Moskva Petushki by the Russian writer Venedikt Yerofeyev.

== Bibliography ==
Some of Tomaš's works include:

- "L'amore al primo binocolo" (with Mehmed Begić, N. Ćišićem i Veselin Gatalo), 2000.
- "Tri puta trideset i tri jednako" (with Mehmed Begić and N. Ćišićem) Mostar, 2001.
- "S rukama pod glavom" Zagreb, 2002.
- "Mama, ja sam uspješan" Zagreb, 2004.
- "Život je šala" Zagreb, 2005.
- "Marko Tomaš i druge pjesme" Zagreb-Sarajevo, 2007.
- "Zbogom, fašisti" Sarajevo, 2009.
- "Bulevar narodne revolucije" Zagreb, 2013.
- "Varanje smrti - izabrane pesme" Beograd, 2014.
- "Ivica Osim - utakmice života" Zenica-Beograd, 2014.
- "Kolodvor i paranoja" Beograd, 2015.
- "Odrastanje melankolije" Beograd, 2015.
- "Crni molitvenik" Zagreb-Beograd, 2015.
- "Regata papirnih brodova" Beograd, 2017.
- "Trideset deveti maj" Beograd, 2018. Zagreb, 2019.
- "Pisma s juga" (a book of essays and columns) Beograd, 2019.
- "Pjesme sa granice" (trilogy composed of the last three collections of poems), Sarajevo, 2019.
- "Želim postati terorist" (knjiga izabranih pesama) LJubljana, 2019.
- "Nemoj me buditi" (prvi roman) Beograd, 2019.
