= Senad =

- Gender: Male

Other gender
- Feminine: Senada

Origin
- Meaning: Support

Senad is a male given name.

In the Balkans, Senad is popular among Bosniaks in the former Yugoslav nations. It is also popular among Albanians. The name comes from the Arabic word sanad (سند), which translates to support. There is also a female equivalent of the name in this region: Senada (for example, Senada Topčagić).

== Given name ==
- Senad Avdić (born 1959), Bosnian journalist
- Senad Bašić (born 1962), Bosnian actor
- Senad Brkić (born 1969), Bosnian footballer
- Senad Gashi (born 1990), German professional boxer of Albanian descent
- Senad Hadžifejzović (born 1962), Bosnian journalist, news anchor, and TV host
- Senad Hadžimusić (born 1957), Bosnian musician
- Senad Halilbašić (born 1988), Bosnian and Austrian author
- Senad Jahić (born 1987), Slovenian footballer
- Senad Jarović (born 1998), German footballer
- Senad Kreso (born 1955), Bosnian football manager
- Senad Lekaj (born 1989), Albanian footballer
- Senad Lulić (born 1986), Bosnian footballer
- Senad Lupić (born 1960), Bosnian footballer
- Senad Merdanović (born 1961), Bosnian footballer
- Senad Podojak (born 1966), Bosnian imam and hafiz
- Senad Repuh (born 1972), Bosnian professional football player
- Senad Rizvanović (born 1968), Yugoslav wrestler
- Senad Sallaku (born 1995), Albanian footballer
- Senad Saletović (born 1968), Bosnian footballer
- Senad Šepić (born 1977), Bosnian politician
- Senad Tiganj (born 1975), Slovenian footballer
- Senad Žerić (born 1977), Bosnian footballer
