= I, Danilo =

1960 novel by Derviš Sušić

- Author: Derviš Sušić
- Original title: Ja, Danilo
- Language: Bosnian
- Genre: Historical fiction
- Publisher: Oslobođenje
- Publication date: 1 February 1960
- Publication place: SFR Yugoslavia
- Pages: 342

I, Danilo (Bosnian: Ja, Danilo) is a novel by Bosnian writer Derviš Sušić. It was released by Oslobođenje on 1 February 1960. It has won praise for its depiction of Bosnia under Soviet-controlled Yugoslavia. It is written in the form of a diary, the journal of a man who bumbles his way through a changed drastically changed society.

I, Danilo was adapted for the stage in 1964.
