= Roman Latković =

Croatian journalist and writer

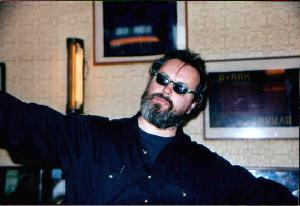
Roman Latković

Roman Latković (born April 10, 1960) is a writer, U.S. asylee, journalist, globetrotter and a former Croatian political commentator. He was an outspoken opponent of Croatian president Franjo Tuđman, and wrote scathing commentary of the Croatian political system in Novi list, in the 1990s. He fled the country in 1996 and was granted the political asylum in the United States in 1998.

== Attack by governmental TV ==
On January 10, 1996 during the prime time TV Dnevnik (TV Daily) reaching 80% of the population, the government controlled Hrvatska Radiotelevizija (Croatian Radio-television) unleashed an eight (8) minutes long attack on Latković.

That attack, initiated by the president of Croatia at that time, Franjo Tudjman, created a political mass-hysteria resembling McCarthyism that lasted over three (3) months and prompted a witch-hunt against Latković who went into hiding to avoid assassination.

== Political asylum in the United States ==
The Lawyers Committee for Human Rights represented Latković in his fight for political asylum in the United States and has published his case in its Critique: Review of the U. S. Department of State's Country Reports on Human Rights Practises for 1995.

Kemal Kurspahić's book Prime Time Crime: Balkan Media in War and Peace (US Institute of Peace Press, 2003) gives Latković attention: "Roman Latković observed that it (the year 1997) would be remembered for the final unmasking of Franjo Tuđman who led the country to ruin. Latković's comment was based on the fact that Tudjman had used his imperial presidential power to prevent the opposition-nominated Zagreb mayor from taking office despite the election results. "Croatia headed by Tudjman is being reduced to a dictatorship, a Mafia-type banana republic and everybody's worst nightmare", Latković's commentary said. Croatian state television (HTV) immediately fired back, stating on prime-time news that "certain forces personified by Roman Latković have taken off their masks" and should instantly be included among "Croatia's enemies". Soon after Latković's commentary, the government dispatched the financial police to Novi List.

Burn this House: The Making and Unmaking of Yugoslavia by Jasminka Udovički, James Ridgeway (Duke University Press, 2000) shares info about Latković as well as The South Slav Journal by Dositey Obradovich Circle (University of Michigan). Mark Thompson also writes about Latković's "intolerable life" in his book Forging War: The Media in Serbia, Croatia & Bosnia-Hercegovina.(University of Luton Press, 1999)

== Summit for Peace and Reconciliation (2013) ==
The Summit was held in Banja Luka, a capital of Republika Srpska (RS) on 9–11 June 2013. Its purpose was to help build an infrastructure for moving forward on political and governmental reforms and to begin the process of finding commonality in the areas of reconciliation and return. Roman Latković acted as a researcher, consultant and a director documenting the event for Bishop Franjo Komarica. Bishop Komarica visited the United States in December 2012. He traveled to Washington D.C and presented the pressing issues that require addressing to move RS forward. Bishop Komarica commenced a dialogue with the US Department of State, USAID and members of the US Congress. The Summit was video documented by Latković.

== Books ==
Roman Latković has published several books:

- Latković, Roman (1990). Koh-I-NOOR za Kraljicu Margot [Koh-I-Noor for Queen Margot] (in Croatian).
- Latković, Roman (1991). Pavana za umrlu djevojcicu [Pavane for a Dead Girl)] (in Croatian).
- Latković, Roman (1993). Jules and Jim (in Croatian).
- Latković, Roman; Dokmanovic, Ranko (1994). Vilinska Istra; a never-ending story [Betwitching Istria; a never-ending story] (in Croatian).
- Latković, Roman (2025). Nitko te neće voljeti kao kurva u Lagosu, Romane Latkoviću! [Nobody Will Love You Like a Streetwalker in Lagos, Roman Latković!] (in Croatian). Latković's first book in Croatian after 29 years in exile.

In 2009 he published his first book in the U.S.,

- Latković, Roman; Smallwood, Robert F. SEO: Facts and Fiction, a tech work on the Search Engine Optimization.
- Latković, Roman; LaQuey, Robert (2009). Twitter: The Dark Side - Does Bit.ly Enable a Massive Click Fraud?.

=== As Trygve E. Wighdal ===
In August 2019 Latković, under the pseudonym "Abbot Trygve E. Wighdal," published Jung's Demon, a serial-killer's tale of love and madness

In June 2022, Latković published his second book as Trygve E. Wighdal, titled Tycho Brahe Secret

In December 2023, Latković published his third book as Trygve E. Wighdal, titled As America Crumbles...: A Grim Chronicle Exploring the Evil Source of America’s Catastrophic Decline .

=== As Cesare di Monte Calvi ===
On September 30, 2025, Latković, under the pseudonym Cesare di Monte Calvi, published The Raven's Enigma: Chasing Forbidden Truths: They Hunt You Back! (ISBN 978-1-7338151-4-7, 514 pages, 78 illustrations). Cesare is the esoteric historian behind The Raven’s Enigma and lead mythographer for the ASTROLOGUS, an AI-driven symbolic system shaped by the book’s unsettling vision of humanity’s upcoming, dystopian entanglement with artificial intelligence.

== Awards ==
"Capra d'Oro" the first prize award for the achievements in revitalizing the cultural life of the Istrian Peninsula. Istrian Tourist Union, Porec, Croatia: 1995
The Best Short Story Award, Radio Television Zagreb, Zagreb, Croatia: 1972
