= South East Europe Media Organisation =

- Native names: Organizata Mediale e Evropës Juglindore (Albanian); Медийна организация за Югоизточна Европа (Bulgarian); Medijska organizacija jugoistočne Europe (Croatian); Mediální organizace pro jihovýchodní Evropu (Czech); Οργανισμός Μέσων Ενημέρωσης Νοτιοανατολικής Ευρώπης (Greek); Délkelet-európai Médiaszervezet (Hungarian); Медиумска организација на Југоисточна Европа (Macedonian); Organizacja Mediów Europy Południowo-Wschodniej (Polish); Organizația Media din Europa de Sud-Est (Romanian); Медијска организација југоисточне Европе (Serbian); Mediálna organizácia pre juhovýchodnú Európu (Slovak); Medijska organizacija jugovzhodne Evrope (Slovene); Güney Doğu Avrupa Medya Organizasyonu (Turkish)
- Abbreviation: SEEMO
- Formation: 1 October 2000
- Headquarters: Zagreb, Croatia
- Region served: South East Europe
- Members: >1000 individuals, >100 media outlets
- Secretary General: Oliver Vujovic
- Website: www.seemo.org

South East Europe Media Organisation (SEEMO) is a regional non-governmental, non-profit network of editors, media executives and leading journalists in Southeast, South, East and Central Europe. The organization aims to create a bridge between international media activities and the media developments in the region. It has headquarters and national committees in several countries. In total 33 member states or territories are included in SEEMO.

== Membership ==
=== Member states ===
- Albania
- Armenia
- Azerbaijan
- Belarus
- Bosnia and Herzegovina
- Bulgaria
- Croatia
- Czech Republic
- Estonia
- Georgia
- Greece
- Hungary
- Kazakhstan
- Kyrgyzstan
- Latvia
- Lithuania
- Moldova
- Montenegro
- North Macedonia
- Poland
- Romania
- Russia
- Serbia
- Slovakia
- Slovenia
- Tajikistan
- Turkey
- Turkmenistan
- Ukraine
- Uzbekistan

== History ==
SEEMO was founded in October 2000 in Zagreb, Croatia, by a group of leading editors-in-chief, media executives and professors of journalism and communications from Southeast Europe, in the presence of representatives of international institutions. SEEMO was part of the International Press Institute (IPI) from 2000 to 2015; since 2016 it has worked independently.

The Secretary General of SEEMO, who initiated the founding, is since 2000 Oliver Vujovic, a former journalist and expert in public relations, political relations and business in South, East and Central Europe.

== Activities ==
One of SEEMO's main activities is protecting press freedom by helping journalists and media outlets in South East Europe. Over 60 percent of SEEMO's press releases and letters of protest to governmental and other officials have had positive results in the past. Every SEEMO protest is distributed to leading regional and international media, national and international governmental and non-governmental organisations, politicians, and public persons and institutions.

In the past, SEEMO has provided direct help to journalists in the region by giving them technical equipment and other assistance. SEEMO also provided the necessary aid to journalists, who received death threats.

SEEMO has over 1650 editors-in-chief, media executives and leading journalists from South East Europe as individual members, and over 100 media outlets and institutions as corporate members.

== Protest Letters ==
SEEMO monitors press freedom in South East Europe and responds to threats and attacks on journalists and media outlets by sending protest letters to governments, inter-governmental organisations, but also companies or some political or other groups. These threats are often brought to SEEMO's attention by its members, many of whom experience such difficulties first-hand while carrying out their profession.

== Press Freedom Missions ==
SEEMO leads missions to countries where press freedom is under threat, meeting with government officials, diplomats, journalists and non-governmental organisations, and providing legal representation and support in court cases. In 2009 SEEMO organised a press freedom mission to Serbia, where the delegation met with Serbian Minister for Internal Affairs Ivica Dacic, as also more than 70 media representatives. In 2011 SEEMO organised a press freedom Mission to Croatia, where the group met with Croatian President Ivo Josipovic and more than 60 media representatives from Croatia, a press freedom missions to Montenegro (meeting with prime minister Igor Luksic and over 30 media representatives), Macedonia (meetings with president Gjorgje Ivanov and prime minister Nikola Gruevski and over 40 media representatives) and Kosovo (meetings with president of Kosovo Atifete Jahjaga and prime minister Hashim Thaçi and more than 50 media representatives). Missions in 2012: Serbia (in February 2012, meeting with Minister of Internal Affairs Ivica Dacic) and Bulgaria. In 2014 SEEMO was organising with IPI a press freedom mission to Slovenia and to Croatia, and in 2015 to Greece. SEEMO organised also three missions to Hungary, one mission to Slovakia and one mission to Bosnia and Herzegovina. Additional SEEMO participated in several international press freedom missions, like four international missions to Turkey, two missions to Macedonia and two missions to Hungary.

== Press Freedom Webpages ==
In 2010, SEEMO started the webpage Hungary Press Freedom (www.hungarypressfreedom.org) that follows the developments connected to the media regulations in Hungary, and in 2011 Turkey Press Freedom (www.turkeypressfreedom.org) that follows the media developments in Turkey, especially the state pressure on journalist in Turkey, as also www.macedoniapressfreedom.org (for North Macedonia) and www.belaruspressfreedom.org (for Belarus).

== Meetings ==
Between January 2000 and 2012 (October), SEEMO has assembled over 14,000 editors-in-chief, media executives, leading journalists and public persons from the region in various meetings. Some of these meetings, like the meeting in Ohrid 2003, involving participants from Belgrade (Serbs) and Pristina (Kosovo-Albanians), were the first of their kind in history.

Between 2002 and 2004, SEEMO organised 14 dialogue meetings between editors-in-chief, media executives and leading journalists from South East Europe.

In 2005, SEEMO organised the first meeting of private news agencies in SEE and a meeting of editors and media executives in Opatija, Croatia, in October, as also in Tirana, Albania, in November.

In 2006, SEEMO organised a regional conference of media representatives from SEE in Vienna, and initiated regular meetings of investigative reporters (first meeting in Opatija, June 2006).

SEEMO organised in 2006 and 2007 eight conferences-workshops for investigative journalists in different countries in SEE.

SEEMO organised several conferences for editors-in-chief and managers of minority media, like the Conference of editors-in-chief and managers of Roma media in South East and Central Europe in 2003 (with over 70 participants), Aromanian media in Sofia (2004) and Tirana (2005), Minority media in SEE in Belgrade in 2007.

SEEMO organised in June 2008 the conference Media, Marketing and Business in Belgrade (Serbia). In December 2008 SEEMO organised the conference Public Broadcasting in South East Europe in Ljubljana (Slovenia), where general managers of the public services and the chairpersons of the boards of public services took part.

In May 2010, SEEMO organised the first South, East and Central Europe Investigative Journalism Days in Montenegro. The second South, East and Central Europe Investigative Journalism Days were in Serbia in May 2011 with topic "Corruption and Media". The third South, East and Central Europe Investigative Journalism Days took place in Chisinau, Moldova, in 2012.

SEEMO is organising in cooperation with SECEPRO and International Academy / International Media Center, and project-partners Konrad Adenauer Foundation (Stiftung) and the Central European Initiative (CEI) the South East Europe Media Forum (SEEMF), as a meeting between journalists and political representatives. The first SEEMF was in Zagreb, Croatia in June 2007, with the participation of the Croatian President Stjepan Mesic and 200 journalists from South East and Central Europe. Second SEEMF was in Sofia, Bulgaria in November 2008, with the participation of the Bulgarian prime minister Sergej Stanishev and 250 journalists in South East and Central Europe. Since 2008 additional regular SEEMF partner is the Raiffeisen International Bank from Vienna. The third SEEMF was in Tirana in November 2009, and the event was opened by the Albanian President Topi. The IV SEEMF took part, in Budapest on 2 and 3 December 2010. The V SEEMF was in Belgrade, Serbia in November 2011, opened by Serbian Prime Minister Mirko Cvetkovic. VI SEEMF, opened by President of Montenegro Filip Vujanovic was in Budva, Montenegro. VII SEEMF was in October 2013 in Bosnia and Herzegovina, Sarajevo, and the event was opened by the President of the Presidency of BIH Zeljko Komsic. VIII SEEMF was in Skopje, Macedonia in October 2014. IX SEEMF was in Bucharest from 5–7 November 2015, X SEEMF will be in Belgrade, Serbia on 21–23 November 2016, and XI SEEMF in Sofia, Bulgaria 2017. More on www.seemf.org.

SEEMO is co-founder of the International Media Center / International Academy.

SEEMO is also co-founder of the South, East and Central Europe PR Organisation (SECEPRO), founded in 2010, as a regional organisation for PR experts, active in more than 30 countries of South, East and Central Europe. The first SECEPRO meeting was in Ljubljana in May 2011 with leading PR representatives from the region. More on www.secepro.org.

2011 SEEMO started in cooperation with SECEPRO and International Academy / International Media Center, and as project partner University of Vienna, with the annual Istanbul Media Days, as an annual meeting of media experts in Istanbul. The event was organised in cooperation with Bilgi University (2011), Kadir Has University (2012) and the event-partner of IMD 2014 is the Istanbul University. More on www.istanbulmediadays.org. With all this partners, SEEMO is organing also since 2013 the annual Commission on Media Policy, that started US President Carter in 1990.

== Partners ==
SEEMO actively cooperates with international, regional and national governmental and non-governmental organisations and institutions. SEEMO also actively cooperates with other international press freedom and media organisations, including IPI, and it supports and participates in joint regional and international projects and activities.

== Training ==
Helping journalists means also furthering their education. More than 50 workshops and seminars have been organised for investigative reporters and representatives of minority media. Workshops and seminars are organised in partnership with International Media Center / International Academy.

== Publications ==
Since 2004, SEEMO has been publishing De Scripto, a quarterly media magazine for South East Europe.

SEEMO also produces the South, East and Central Europe Media Handbook (until 2008 South East Europe Media Handbook), an annual publication covering media developments in the region, which includes selected media contacts. Editions 2003/2004 in Albanian, Serbian / Croatian / Bosnian / Montenegrin, English, 2004/2005, 2005/2006, 2006, 2007, 2008, 2009. The 2009 edition was in two volumes over 2,500 pages.

Other Books:

- Zlocin u 19.30 by Kemal Kurspahic (published in 2003 in Sarajevo and 2004 in Belgrade by SEEMO),
- Media and Minorities in South East Europe (published in 2006)
- Handbook for Investigative Journalists in SEE
- Media, Marketing and Business
- Women, Men and Media

Other publications:

- Istrazivacko novinarstvo (Serbian, Croatian, Bosnian and Montenegrin language)
- Public Service in South East and Central Europe.
- SEEMO Safety Net Manual (in 12 languages)
- Police violence and press freedom in Greece (IPI with SEEMO)
- Soft Censorship in Macedonia (with WAN-IFRA)
- Soft Censorship in Bulgaria (with WAN-IFRA)

== Awards ==
SEEMO also gives awards for outstanding achievements in the field of media.

The Dr Erhard Busek SEEMO Award for Better Understanding honours journalists in South East Europe whose work promotes a climate of better understanding among peoples in the region and strengthens efforts to end ethnic divisions, racism, and xenophobia. Winners of the award include:

- Denis Latin, Latinica, Hrvatska Radio i Televizija, Croatia (2002)
- Kemal Kurspahić, former editor-in-chief, Oslobodjenje, Bosnia and Herzegovina (2003)
- Brankica Petkovič, Peace Institute, Slovenia (2005)
- Danko Plevnik, Slobodna Dalmacija, Croatia (2006)
- Milena Dimitrova, Trud, Bulgaria (2007)
- Brankica Stanković, B92, Serbia (2008)
- Boris Bergant, EBU, Slovenia (2009)
- Omer Karabeg, Radio Free Europe, Czech Republic (2010)
- Dragutin Drago Hedl Drago Hedl, Jutarnji List, Croatia (2011)
- Jeta Xharra, RTK, Kosovo (2012)
- Željka Lekić-Subašić, head of the Eurovision News Exchange for South East Europe (ERNO) and Nenad Šebek, spokesman for the Regional Cooperation Council (RCC) (2014)
- NGO International Academy, Belgrade and Radomir Licina, co-founder Belgrade daily Danas (2015)
- Bülent Mumay, journalist, Turkey (2016)
- Marina Constantinoiu, Romania (2017)

The SEEMO Human Rights Award is presented every year on 10 December, International Human Rights Day. Winners include:

- Christine von Kohl, Human Rights fighter, Austria (2002)
- Nebojša Popov, founder Republika magazine, Serbia (2003)
- Fatos Lubonja, journalist, Albania (2004)
- Abdulhalim Dede, media-owner, Greece (2006)
- Seki Radončić, investigative journalist, Montenegro - Bosnia-Herzegovina (2007)
- Spomenka Hribar, writer, Slovenia (2008)
- Pavol Demes, Marshal found, Slovakia (2009)
- Christo Komarnitski, cartoonist, Bulgaria (2010)
- Veton Surroi, Koha Ditore Group, Kosovo (2011)
- Turkish cameraman Cüneyt Ünal and his missing colleague, Jordanian reporter Bashar Fahmi Kaddumi (2012)
- Bülent Mumay, editor-in-chief of Hurriyet.com.tr (2013)

The SEEMO - CEI Award for Investigative Journalism:

- Drago Hedl, Croatia (2008)
- Beser Likmeta, Albania (2009). A special mention to Esad Hecimovic from Bosnia and Herzegovina and to Stefan Candea from Romania, in recognition of their valuable contribution to investigative journalism
- Adrian Mogos, Romania (2010). Special mention to Iryna Khalip from Belarus and Lydia Pavlova from Bulgaria for their valuable contribution to investigative journalism.
- Kalicki Włodzmierz, Poland (2011). Special Investigative Journalism Diploma to Artan Hoxha (Albania), Dijana Subotički (Serbia), Matej Šurc and Blaž Zgaga (Slovenia)
- Matej Šurc and Blaž Zgaga, Slovenia (2012). Special Investigative Diploma to Albanian journalist Telnis Skuqi from Gjirokastra. A Special Mention was given to CIN Sarajevo
- The award for Professional Journalist to Mahir Šahinović from the Center for Investigative Reporting in Sarajevo (CIN) and the Organized Crime and Corruption Reporting Project (OCCRP). Rosen Tsvetkov got the award as “Young Professional Journalists” (2013)
- Brankica Stanković in the section “Professional Journalists”, Sadeta Fišić, Jovana Kljajić and Maida Salkanović in the section “Young Professional Journalists (2014)
- Aleksandra Bogdani from Albania and Nadia Burdey from Ukraine (2015)

The SEEMO Photo Award for Human Rights:

- Maja Zlatevska, Macedonia (I) and Marko Djurica, Serbia (special) (2008)
- Nebojša Radosavljević Raus, Serbia (2009)
- Mahir Vranac, Bosnia and Herzegovina (2010)
- Janko Petkovic, Serbia (2011)
- Igor Pavicevic, Serbia (2012)
