= Džamonja =

Džamonja is a Serbo-Croatian surname. Notable people with the surname include:

- Dario Džamonja (1955–2001), Bosnian journalist;
- Dušan Džamonja (1928–2009), Yugoslav sculptor.
