= Oliver Vujović =

Yugoslav-German-Austrian journalist

Oliver Vujović is a Yugoslav, German and Austrian former journalist, co-founder and today Secretary General of the international press freedom group South East Europe Media Organisation (SEEMO).

Vujović graduated in economics (public relations) and is now PhD candidate in Vienna. (University of Vienna). As a child he had a role in the TV series Salaš u Malom Ritu (1975).

Between 1987 and 2000 Vujović worked as a freelance journalist in South East Europe, interviewing over 400 leading personalities and publishing over 3500 articles in the period. He worked in Belgrade with Indeks 202, Radio Belgrade (1988-1989) and Radio B92 (1989–1991), then he was correspondent from the Balkans for the Austrian daily Die Presse in Belgrade (1991–2000). After the Yugoslav Ministry of Information decided to recall his accreditation, from 1994 to 1997 Vujović reported from Skopje (Macedonia) and Szeged (Hungary), also under the pseudonym David Fatschel. In the same period he was also Querleser Wien Correspondent for South East Europe.

In 1998-1999 Vujović later worked in the private sector, as Product manager in Henkel CEE in the Vienna headquarters and as Director responsible for marketing in the newly founded company Henkel Yugoslavia.

In 1999 he founded together with Christine von Kohl the magazine BALKAN Südosteuropäischer Dialog (later Balkan anders) and supported the establishment of the web portal BalkanPoint.org

In 2000 Vujović founded with a group of 40 editors and media owners the international press freedom group SEEMO, of which he is Secretary General. SEEMO was between 2000 and 2015 affiliate of the International Press Institute. Vujović organised the first meeting between leading media representatives from Serbia and Kosovo (with over 100 editors-in-chief and media executives) in Ohrid in May 2003.

He later founded also the South East and Central Europe PR Organisation (SECEPRO), of which he also is Advisor. He is the initiator of the South East Europe Media Forum (annual event), the Istanbul Media Days (annual event), and the Investigative Journalism Days.

Vujović has been editor, co-editor, author or co-author in several books, publications, research articles, research papers and magazines. Some of publications: Guide for Investigative Reporters, Investigative Reporting in SEE etc. Also editor and publisher of SEEMO Media Handbook (annual), of the book Media and Minorities in South East Europe (2006), and publisher of the De Scripto magazine.

== Publications ==
- Kosovo and Propaganda War (Report about Serbia and Media by Oliver Vujovic), Vienna 1999
- South East Europe Media Handbook 2003/2004 (Publisher / Editor Oliver Vujovic, Editor Radomir Licina), Vienna 2004
- South East Europe Media Handbook 2004/2005 (Publisher / Editor Oliver Vujovic, Editor Radomir Licina), Vienna 2005
- De Scripto Magazine (4 x annually since 2004), Publisher - Introduction Oliver Vujovic
- Media and Minorities in South East Europe (Publisher Oliver Vujovic, Editors Oliver Vujovic and Prof. Thomas Bauer), Vienna 2006
- South East Europe Media Handbook 2005/2006 (Publisher / Editor Oliver Vujovic, Editor Radomir Licina), Vienna 2006
- South East Europe Media Handbook 2006/2007 (Publisher / Editor Oliver Vujovic, Editor Radomir Licina), Vienna 2007
- South East and Central Europe Media Handbook 2008 (Publisher / Editor Oliver Vujovic, Editor Radomir Licina) in Volume I and Volume II over 2000 pages, Vienna 2008
- Investigative Reporting in South East Europe (Publisher / Editor Oliver Vujovic, Editor Sasa Lekovic), Vienna - Belgrade - Sarajevo 2007
- South East and Central Europe Media Handbook 2009 (Publisher / Editor Oliver Vujovic, Editor Radomir Licina) in Volume I and Volume II over 2500 pages, Vienna 2009
- South East and Central Europe Media Handbook 2010 (Publisher / Editor Oliver Vujovic, Editor Radomir Licina) in Volume I and Volume II over 2500 pages, Vienna 2010
- South East and Central Europe Media Handbook 2012 (Publisher / Editor Oliver Vujovic, Editor Radomir Licina) in Volume I and Volume II over 2500 pages, Vienna 2012
- South East and Central Europe Media Handbook 2013 (Publisher / Editor Oliver Vujovic, Editor Radomir Licina) in Volume I and Volume II over 2500 pages, Vienna 2013
- Publisher Safety of Journalist guideline (in 12 languages), Vienna 2015
