= Hajrudin Somun =

Bosnian diplomat

Hajrudin Somun (born April 10, 1937, Čajniče, Bosnia and Herzegovina) is a Bosnian former journalist and diplomat, who served as the Ambassador of Bosnia and Herzegovina to Turkey (1993–2003).

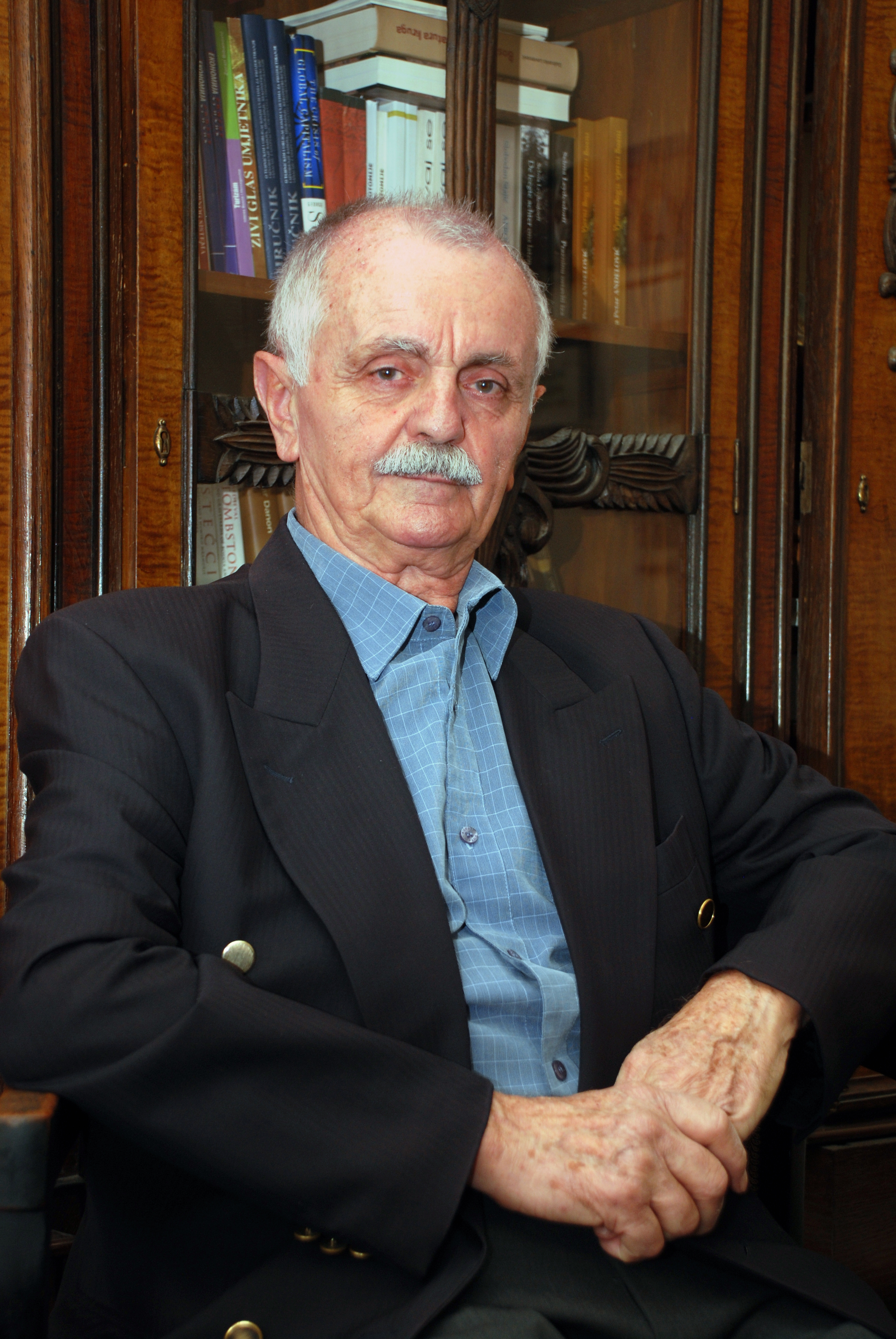
Cover photo of book by Hajrudin Somun "Personal View of the World" by Rabic d.o.o.

Somun was born in Čajniče to father Ibrahim, an imam, and mother Muniba (née Sirćo), a manufacturer in a shoe factory. He was the best student in his generation in Arabic, Persian and Turkish languages (1962) at the University of Sarajevo, and specialized Arabic at the Baghdad University in Iraq (1962–65). Somun is a "respected journalist" since high school, Somun was employed at the Sarajevo leading daily Oslobođenje (1965-1969), then TV Sarajevo as war reporter and commentator for international affairs (1969-1976). He first made his mark in Yugoslav journalism with a series of articles from Iraqi Kurdistan, where he went secretly and spent time in the headquarters of the renowned Kurdish leader Mustafa Barzani. He reported on conflicts in the Middle East and was awarded for his TV films on the Yom Kippur War in 1973 and the Palestinian Commandos in 1974. He was also rewarded by various journalist awards in the former Yugoslavia and Bosnia. The Association of Journalists of Bosnia and Herzegovina awarded him with the Lifetime Award in 2015. Somun was appointed Middle Eastern correspondent for the Yugoslav News Agency (TANJUG), reporting from Baghdad for the Persian Gulf area (1976–79). He reported on the Islamic Revolution in Iran in 1978-79 that lead to his first co-authored publication with well-known Iranian writer Reza Baraheni.

The Ministry of Foreign Affairs of the former Yugoslavia (SFRJ) offered him a position as counselor to the Yugoslav Embassy in Baghdad, Iraq, where he served 1979–82. Somun was Advisor on International Affairs to Republic of Bosnia and Herzegovina until he was posted abroad again as minister counselor to the Yugoslav Embassy in Tehran, Iran (1987-1991). He was the Director of International Liaisons and Protocol of the Winter Olympic Games 1984 in Sarajevo.

He was appointed Foreign Policy Advisor to the Presidency and the first President of the independent Bosnia and Herzegovina, the late Alija Izetbegović. He was part of the Bosnian delegation at the London and Geneva Peace Conference (1992-1993), as well as at frequent international peace seeking meetings and mediation for the war-torn Bosnia. Somun was appointed first Ambassador of Bosnia and Herzegovina to Ankara, Turkey in 1993 where he remained for five years. In the Bosnian Foreign Ministry he served as the head for non-European countries and spokesperson until his last diplomatic appointment as ambassador in Kuala Lumpur, Malaysia (2002-2004). While serving in Kuala Lumpur, he wrote the book "Mahathir: The Secret of the Malaysian Success" that was a best-seller in Malaysia for several years.

After retirement he lectured on history of diplomacy at the Philip-Noel Baker International University in Sarajevo, Bosnia and Herzegovina, and today he actively publishes books, and contributes to the daily and weekly TV, papers and magazines in Bosnia and Herzegovina and abroad. He is currently completing a book on Kurdistan and is the Honorary Consul General of Bangladesh in Bosnia and Herzegovina.

Books

The Hashemite Kingdom of Jordan, Beograd: Rad, 1976.

The Roots of the Iranian Revolution, co-author with the Iranian writer Reza Baraheni, Belgrade: NIN-Politika, 1979.

Beirut in Poetry (translation and interpretation of contemporary Palestinian poetry), Sarajevo: Radio-Sarajevo, 1987.

Bosnia Today - Kuala Lumpur, Malaysia, Limkokwing, 2003.

Mahathir, tajna malezijskog čuda, Sarajevo: Dani, 2003.

Mahathir: The Secret of the Malaysian Success, Kuala Lumpur: Pelanduk, 2003.

Ghassan Kanafani: From the Country of Sad Oranges, Sarajevo: Dobra knjiga, 2012.

Personal View of the World, Sarajevo: Rabic, 2012.

Sarajevo: My City, co-author, Sarajevo: Rabic, 2013.

Palestinian Naqba, Sarajevo: Rabic, 2015. (Palestinska nakba)

Are we anti-semitic? Links between the nations of former Yugoslavia with Jews and Palestinians, Sarajevo: Rabic, 2017. (Jesmo i antisemiti? Veze naroda bivše Jugoslavije sa Jevrejima i Palestincima) (promoted in Sarajevo 19 June 2017, Zagreb, Croatia 21 June 2017 and Ljubljana, Slovenia 22 June 2017)

Gasana Kanafani iz dežele žalostnih pomorandž, Hajrudin and Lejla Somun, Forma 7, Ljubljana, Slovenija, 2017.)

Sefernameh from Iran (Sefernama iz Irana), Sarajevo: Dobra knjiga, 2019.(promoted in Sarajevo 14 February 2019 book review

Goraždans from the past (Goraždani iz prošlog vremena), Sarajevo: Dobra knjiga, 2022.

Notable articles

Bosnia-Herzegovina Diaspora, Forum Bosnae, Vol. 1 No.1/2, pp 128–135, Sarajevo: Forum Bosnae, 1998.

"Bosnia and Herzegovina – Turkey, 1992-1995," in A Bridge Between Cultures: Studies on Ottoman and Republican Turkey in memory of Ali Ihsan Bagis, edited by Sinan Kuneralp. The ISIS Press, Istanbul, 2006.

Turkish Foreign Policy in the Balkans and "Neo-Ottomanism": A Personal Account, Insight Turkey Vol. 13 / No. 3 / 2011 pp. 33–41

How Middle East revolutions relativize theories on „neo-Ottomanism", Politeia, Year 1, No. 2, Dec 2011

Policy analysis: “Iran and the Middle East – Perspectives Resting on Old Premises”, Foreign Policy Initiative BiH and Friedrich Ebert Stiftung, Sarajevo, October 2016

Interviews

Novo vrijeme, newsportal, Hajrudin Somun: Ekstremisti ISIS-a će formirati novu, ekstremističku državu

From Sarajevo to Tehran and Back, Iranian.com by Fariba Amini

Conference presentation: Debating New Turkey, 10 December 2010

OBN TV, Reflex: Political Situation in Egypt and Turkey, 29 July 2013

Federal Radio, The World Today, 4 January 2014,

Liberty TV, 30 Years Since Sarajevo Winter Olympic Games, 2 February 2014,

Radio Free Europe, Sarajevo Three Decades Later: Far Away from the Olympic Motto, 8 February 2014

TV1 Ukraine Crisis, 19 April 2014

HRT1 News, On ISIS and Iraq, 26 June 2014

FACE TV Face to Face Interview, 12 December 2015

OSM TV Face of the Nation Interview, 26 October 2016

TV1 Refugees and Berlin Attack, 21 December 2016

N1 - CNN - There will be no war! 2 February 219
