= Dario Džamonja =

Bosnian journalist (1955-2001)

- Born: 25 January 1955; Sarajevo, SFR Yugoslavia
- Died: 15 October 2001 (aged 46); Sarajevo, Bosnia and Herzegovina
- Occupation: Journalist
- Writing career
- Notable works: Ako ti jave da sam pao (2013); Intimna prepiska (2023)

Dario Džamonja (18 January 1955 – 15 October 2001) was a Bosnian journalist.

== Biography ==
He was born in Sarajevo in 1955. He enrolled in high school, but never finished because he had already started his life in Sarajevo's taverns, indulging in alcohol. He was the child of divorced parents. His mother moved to the Netherlands, so he lived with his grandparents. He experienced two major family tragedies - the suicide of his father and the suicide of his uncle. When the war in Bosnia began, in 1993 he left Sarajevo and went to live in United States with his family. He never felt like he belonged to United States. He was tormented by homesickness in America.

In 1998 he returned to Sarajevo from America. He said: I returned from America for one reason – not to die in America as a chef, but to die in Sarajevo as a writer.

He made a living by writing columns and very short newspaper commentaries on everyday topics. He was a columnist for Slobodna Bosna (which after his exile offered him to write about his American everyday life), Večernje novine, Naši dani, Oslobođenje, Kolumnista, Valter, Valter ekspres, and worked as an editor for Lica magazine.

He died on 15 October 2001. in Sarajevo.

== Works ==
- Priče iz moje ulice (Sarajevo, 1979)
- Zdravstvena knjižica (Sarajevo, 1985)
- Drugo izdanje (Sarajevo, 1987)
- Priručnik (Sarajevo, 1988)
- These days (Sarajevo, 1989)
- Dirty laundry (Sarajevo, 1990)
- Prljavi veš (Sarajevo, 1991)
- Pisma iz ludnice (Sarajevo, 2001)
- Ptica na žici (Sarajevo, 2003)
- Priče (Sarajevo, 2003)
- Ako ti jave da sam pao (Sarajevo, 2013)
- Intimna prepiska (Sarajevo-Zagreb, 2023)

== Awards ==
- Veselin Masleša (1985),
- Fund Free Expression Award (1993)
- Writes Club Madison (1994)
- Madison2 (1996)
