= Gordana Knežević =

Gordana Knežević (Serbian Cyrillic: Гордана Кнежевић; born July 1950 in Belgrade, then Yugoslavia) is a Serbian-born journalist. A former deputy editor of Oslobođenje, she covered the siege of Sarajevo from 1992–94. From 1996, she was based in Toronto, Canada as the online desk editor at Reuters. She served two terms at the Board of Canadian Journalists for Free Expression. She is now based in Prague and writes "Balkans Without Borders" for Radio Free Europe/Radio Liberty. She was head of the RFE/RL Balkan Service from 2008–16.

An excerpt from her article in the Toronto Star on 11 April 1999:

"I was a Serb besieged by Serbs. And I identified with each person in Sarajevo exposed to Serb shelling. I witnessed the pain of Bosnian Muslims, Croats, Jews and Serbs who were forced from their homes. I could not possibly identify with the people who had started all the shooting, or lend the perpetrators of that action moral support through silence."

== Awards and recognitions ==
- International Editor of the Year for 1993 - World Press Review
- International Women's Media Foundation Courage in Journalism Award in 1992
- Rothko Chapel Foundation’s Oscar Romero Human Rights Award
