= Blesok =

Macedonian magazine

Blesok | Shine is the first Macedonian on-line arts and cultural magazine, published bimonthly, in both Macedonian and English. Its founder and editor-in-chief is the poet Igor Isakovski.

"Blesok", officially titled "Blesok – literature & other arts" has been published by the Cultural Institution Blesok since 12 March 1998. Besides the webzine, the publisher also has significant production of e-books (on-line and on CD-ROMs), and in hardcopy.
