= Derviš Sušić =

Bosnian writer (1925–1990)

- Born: 3 June 1925; Vlasenica, Kingdom of Yugoslavia
- Died: 1 September 1990 (aged 65); Tuzla, SR Bosnia and Herzegovina, Yugoslavia

Derviš Sušić (3 June 1925 – 1 September 1990) was a Bosnian writer, known best for his first work I, Danilo. His political affiliations and life path had a significant impact on the themes of his literary works.

Sušić was a Yugoslav Partisan during World War II and a communist in Yugoslavia. He completed the teacher's college in Tuzla.

== Works ==
- Jabučani (1950)
- S proleterima (1950)
- Momče iz Vrgorca ("The Boy from Vrgorac", 1953)
- I, Danilo ("Ja, Danilo", 1960)
- Danilo u stavu mirno ("Danilo at Attention", 1961)
- Teferič (1963)
- Kurir: Roman za djecu (1964)
- Drugarica istorija. Scenska igra za djecu (1965)
- Pobune ("Rebellions", 1966)
- Uhode ("Spies", 1969)
- Hodža straha ("The Imam of Fear", 1973)
- Žestine (1976)
- Tale (1980)
- Parergon (1980)
- Izabrana djela: I-X (1980)
- Žar i mir Zar: Hronika jednog mirnodopskog ljeta negdje u Bosni (1983)
- Veliki vezir. Istorijska drama u dva dijela (1984)
- Izabrana djela: I-X (1985)
- A. triptih (1985)
- Nevakat: Roman (1987)
- Jesenji cvat ("Autumn Flowering", 1988)
- Drame ("Dramas", 1988)
- Cvijet za čovjekoljublje (1989)
