= Senad Avdić =

Bosnian journalist (born 1959)

- Born: 1959 (age 66–67); Sarajevo, SFR Yugoslavia,
- Occupation: journalist
- Writing career
- Notable works: E, jebi ga jarane.../ Noćas spaljujemo iluzije: 1991-2007 (2007)

Senad Avdić (born 1959) is a Bosnian journalist, editor-in-chief of the Slobodna Bosna. Many consider him as a veteran of Bosnian journalism.

== Biography ==
He was born in Sarajevo in 1959. He graduated from the Faculty of Political Sciences (Department of Journalism). As a young journalist, he wrote for Naši Dani, then he was the editor of the youth magazine Lica, and at the end of the eighties, the editor-in-chief of the Yugoslav youth newspaper Mladost. As a correspondent he wrote for Vjesnik, Polet and Zagreb's Start, and his columns were published in As, Oslobođenje, Sarajevo's Nedjelja and Bosanski pogledi.

Since 1991, he has been the editor-in-chief of Slobodna Bosna, which was published in a new edition from 1995 to 2016, and after that he published columns on the Slobodna Bosna website and the fortnightly magazine Start BiH.

From the Association of Journalists of Bosnia and Herzegovina, Senad Avdić was declared journalist of the year twice, in 2009 and 1994, and Nezavisne novine awarded him the Nikola Guzijan award in 2006. Senad Avdić's columns, which he wrote in Slobodna Bosna from 1991 to 2007, were combined in a book called E, jebi ga jarane.../ Noćas spaljujemo iluzije: 1991-2007. Columns from that book was most read weekly reading in Bosnia and Herzegovina for decades.

He lives and works in Sarajevo.

== Works ==
- E, jebi ga jarane.../ Noćas spaljujemo iluzije: 1991-2007 (Sarajevo, 2007)
- Gole godine (1987-1988) (Sarajevo, 2025)

Preceded by Position created	Editor-in-chief of the Slobodna Bosna; 1991–	Incumbent
