= Oslobođenje =

Bosnian daily newspaper

- Front page, 26 March 2018
- Type: Daily newspaper
- Format: Berliner
- Owner: Sarajevska Pivara
- Founder: Communist Party of Yugoslavia
- Publisher: Oslobođenje d.o.o.
- Editor-in-chief: Vildana Selimbegović
- Founded: 30 August 1943; 83 years ago
- Political alignment: Liberal
- Language: Bosnian
- Headquarters: Bistrik 9, Sarajevo
- Country: Bosnia and Herzegovina
- ISSN: 0350-4352
- Website: www.oslobodjenje.ba

The Oslobođenje (Serbo-Croatian Cyrillic: Ослобођење; Bosnian pronunciation: [oslobod͡ʑěːɲe]; 'Liberation') is the Bosnian national daily newspaper, published in Sarajevo. It is the oldest daily newspaper still in circulation in Bosnia and Herzegovina. Founded on 30 August 1943, in the midst of World War II, on a patch of territory liberated by Partisans, in what was otherwise a German-occupied country, the paper gained recognition over the years for its high journalistic standards and has been a recipient of numerous domestic and international awards.

== History ==
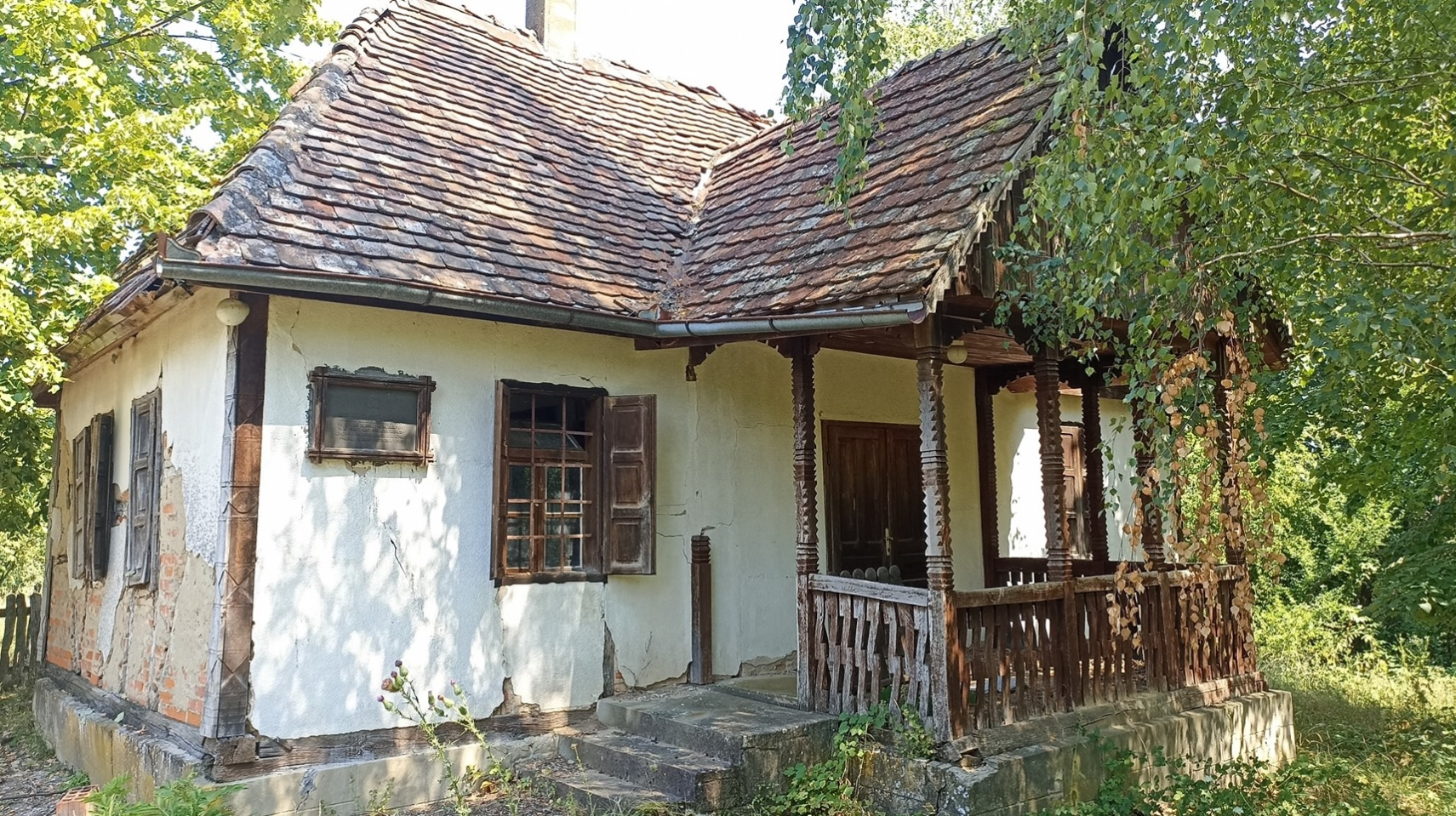
Lazar Jović's house in Donja Trnova near Ugljevik where the Oslobođenje was founded on August 30, 1943.

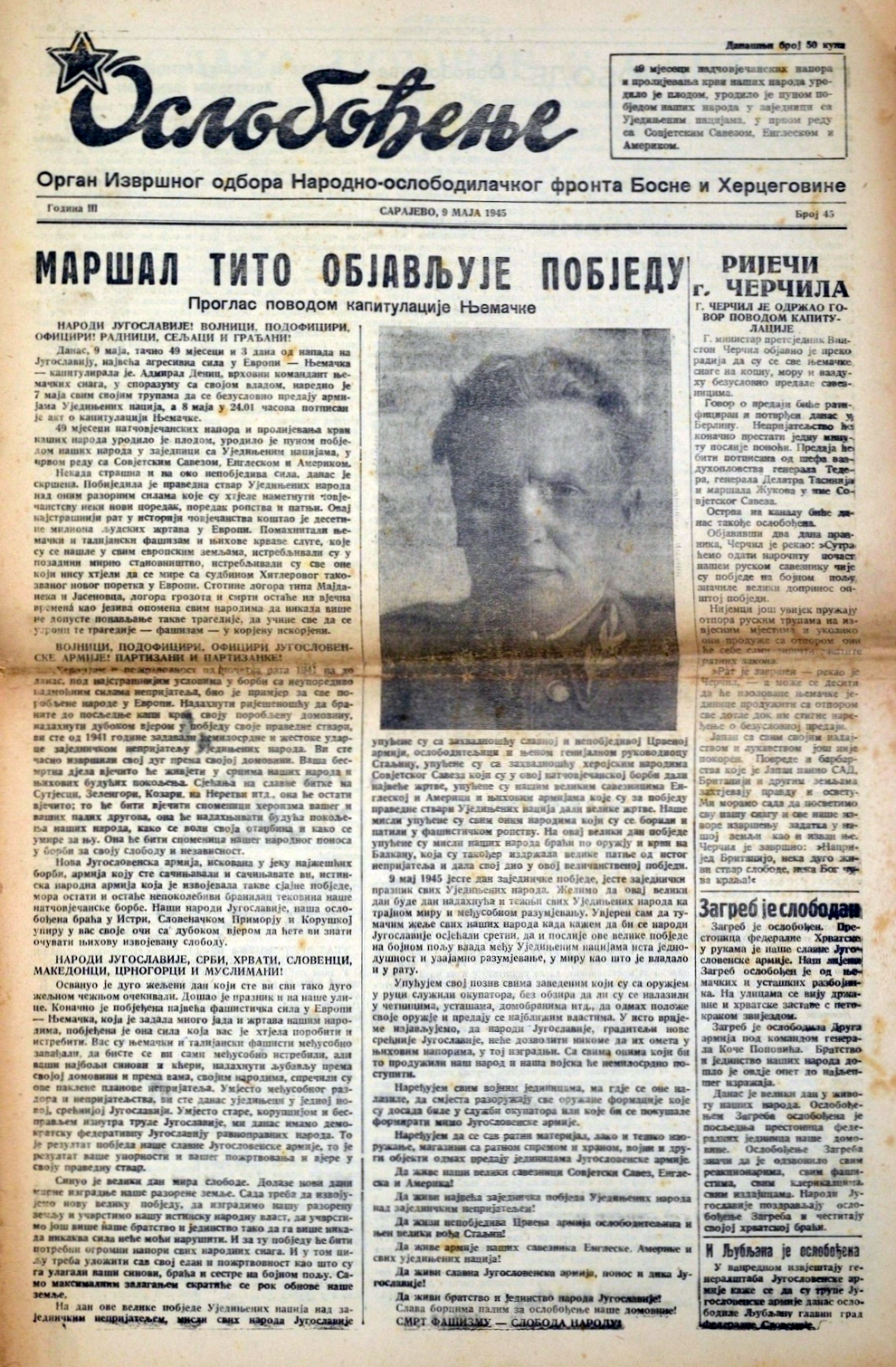
Front page of the Oslobođenje on May 9, 1945

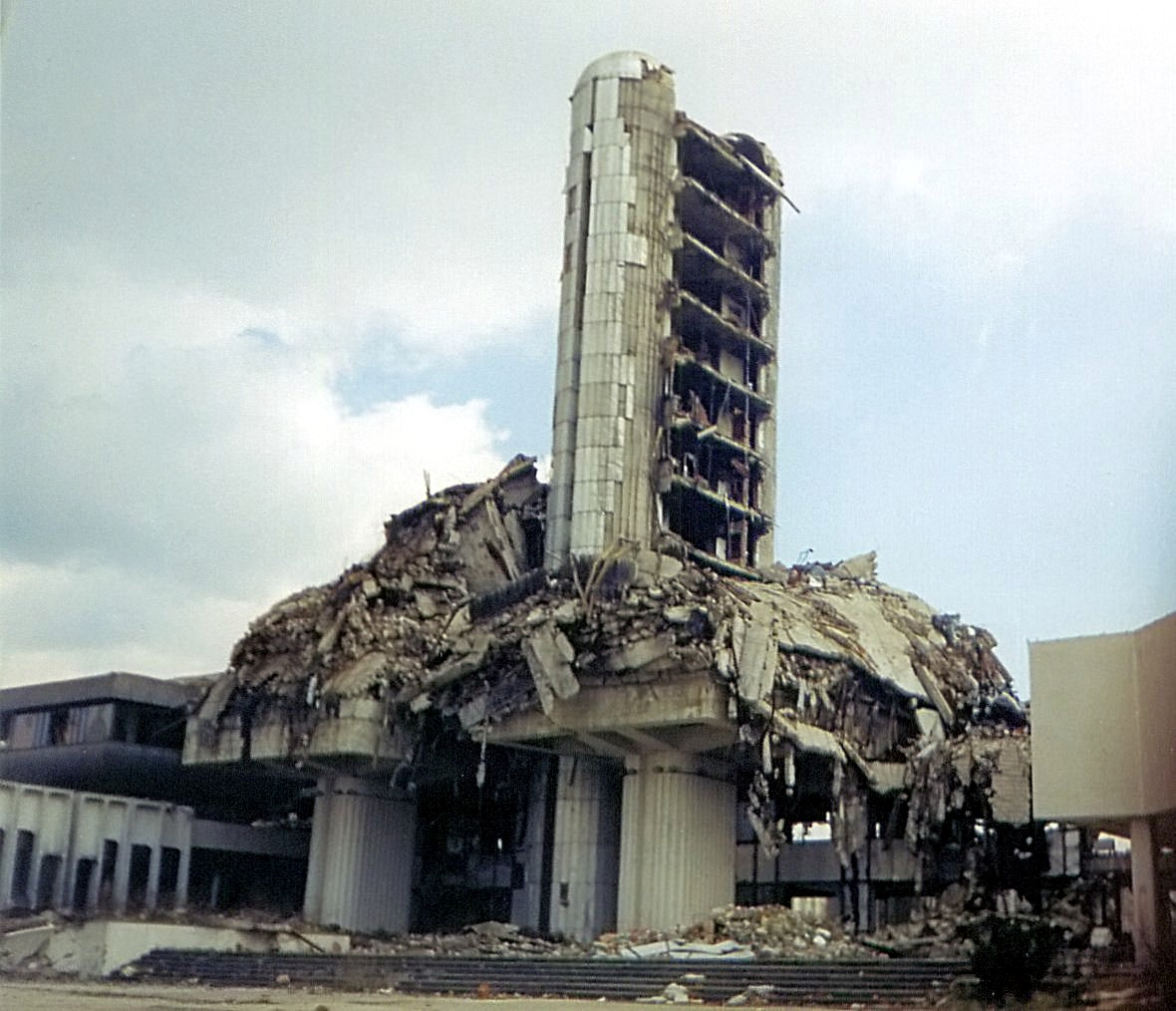
The Oslobođenje building was targeted from the beginning of the war by Serb troops led by Ratko Mladić

The Oslobođenje was founded on 30 August 1943 in Donja Trnova near Ugljevik, as an anti-Nazi newspaper. The first issue was printed on August 30, 1943 in Donja Trnova near Ugljevik as a newsletter of the National Liberation Front for Bosnia and Herzegovina. The first editor was Rodoljub Čolaković.

Apart from Rodoljub Čolaković, the main articles for the first issue were written by Avdo Humo and Hasan Brkić, also editors. The two were assisted by professional journalists Vilko Winterhalter and Milan Gavrić, and writers Skender Kulenović and Branko Ćopić. Meša Selimović was one of the founders of the Oslobođenje. In the first issue of the Oslobođenje, Selimović wrote an article about the Orthodox Church in the Soviet Union, according to information he heard on radio stations Moscow and Free Yugoslavia.

The first courier was Raif Dizdarević. He delivered the first issues of the Oslobođenja to Jajce, where the AVNOJ was already being prepared.

The second (September) issue was also printed in Donja Trnova, without markings of the place of publication and printing due to the danger of an enemy attack. During the World War II, the newspaper was also printed in Tuzla (the third, October issue), the village of Busije near Ribnik (the fourth, fifth, sixth and seventh issues), in Međeđe Brdo near Sanica (from the eighth to the 12th issue) and in Jajce (from 13 to 29 issues). On April 12, 1945, the 30th issue of Oslobođenje was published, the last in the World War II, which was printed in Sarajevo, which has been the headquarters of this newspaper since then.

In mid 1970s, while SR Bosnia and Herzegovina was a part of SFR Yugoslavia, the newspaper run a subsidiary office in Frankfurt in West Germany which published the edition targeted at numerous Yugoslav workers ('gastarbeiter') and other citizens living in the country.

On August 30, 1973, Josip Broz Tito sent congratulations to newspaper on the occasion of its 30th anniversary. It was then established Day of the Oslobođenje—August 30.

The most prosperous time of the newspaper was 1984. The Oslobođenje was included bid for the 1984 Winter Olympics, its preparations and implementation. All the capacities of the company, which had around 2,500 employees in 1984, were put to use for this historic, not only sporting, event. In the days of 14 Winter Olympics, the Oslobođenje achieved the largest circulation, and the entire system a great business success. In 1984, the Oslobođenje with 21 editions achieved 126 million printed copies of newspapers, magazines, publications and books. It was the year of the highest production for the Oslobođenja printing house since the installation of a new rotation in 1980 in Sarajevo neighborhood of Nedžarići.

During the Bosnian war and the Siege of Sarajevo, the Oslobođenje staff operated out of a makeshift newsroom in a bomb shelter after its 10-story office building had been destroyed. The war left five staff members dead and 25 wounded. Kjašif Smajlović, the Oslobođenje correspondent from Zvornik, was the first journalist victim of the Bosnian war.

On May 29, 1992, the Oslobođenja building was set on fire. The first, but not the last time. For months, the Army of Republika Srpska did not give up its intentions of disabling and obstructing the work of the newspaper. No one expected the release of a new issue the next morning. However, at 6 o'clock in the morning, a news story was published on the front page with a photo of the fire and the message: Oslobođenje ide dalje (The Oslobođenje goes further). Three months later, the Oslobođenje building was set on fire for the second time. After this attack, the skyscraper's eastern and western portions collapsed due to the fires weakening its support columns.

The Oslobođenje headquarters in Sarajevo

On April 9, 1993, among many people from around the world, US Senator Joe Biden visited the Oslobođenje. At that time, his host was the newspaper's editor-in-chief, Kemal Kurspahić.

Like the world, on this April day, I wonder if it is possible to put Bosnia and Herzegovina together after so much carnage? Here, in the Oslobođenje, I see that it is possible. Before that, I almost forgot that there are Serbs, Croats and Bosniaks who want to live together. Do you realize that what you are doing is fantastic? I am leaving this place with a full heart, and not sad like from Belgrade, Zagreb and eastern Bosnia, because it seemed to me that there was no hope there. Here, even though everything around you is broken, there is hope. I admire what you do, I admire your courage and I wish you success.

— Joe Biden, US Senator

In 1993, it was awarded the Sakharov Prize for Freedom of Thought. The editors of Oslobođenje, Kemal Kurspahić and Gordana Knežević, were named International Editors of the Year for 1993 by the World Press Review in New York, for their "bravery, tenacity, and dedication to the principles of journalism." Duo also received the Courage in Journalism Award in 1992 from the International Women's Media Foundation in Washington, D.C.. Kurspahić was also recipient of the Nieman Fellowship for Journalism at Harvard University in 1994, among other honors. Immediately after the war ended in 1995, editor-in-chief Mehmed Halilović accepted the University of Missouri [Mizzou] Honor Medal from the School of Journalism in Columbia, Missouri for continuous publication of the daily newspaper throughout the 1992–95 siege of Sarajevo. Editor Zlatko Dizdarević won several international awards, including: ‘Reporters sans frontieres-Fondation de France’ in Paris, the ‘Bruno Kreisky’ prize for human rights in Vienna, and the 'Paolo Borssalino’ prize for journalistic courage in Rome. During the war, its staff, consisting of Bosniaks, Bosnian Serbs, and Bosnian Croats, managed to print the paper every day, with one exception.

In 2006, the company was bought by way of the Sarajevo Stock Exchange by the Sarajevska pivara. In addition to the Oslobođenje daily, this publishing house today has digital platforms—the Oslobođenje, Dani and Sport1 portals. As part of this corporation, there is also Dječja štampa (Male novine, Vesela sveska, Vesela sveska sveznalica), as well as television channels O Kanal, O Kanal Plus and O Kanal Music.

== Notable persons ==
=== Editors ===
Incomplete data:

- Aziz Hadžihasanović, editor-in-chief 1970s
- Avdo Humo, one of editors in WWII
- Derviš Sušić, one of editors 1949-1951
- Erih Koš, one of editors
- Hasan Brkić, one of editors in WWII
- Kemal Kurspahić, editor-in-chief 1988-1994
- Mirko Šagolj, editor-in-chief 1999-?
- Rodoljub Čolaković, editor-in-chief 1943-?
- Skender Kulenović, one of editors in WWII
- Luka Popović, editor-in-chief ?-1971-?
- Ljubiša Jakšić, editor-in-chief ?-1980-?
- Mak Dizdar, editor-in-chief 1948-1951
- Mehmed Halilović, editor-in-chief 1994-1999
- Mirko Ostojić, editor-in-chief ?-1961-?
- Vildana Selimbegović, editor-in-chief 2008-currently
- Rizo Mehinagić, editor-in-chief ?-1968-?

=== Correspondents ===
Incomplete data:

- Zdravko Kokotović, from Moscow 1974-1986
- Gordana Knežević, from Cairo 1987-1991
- Vlastimir Mijović, from Moscow 1990-1995
- Ljiljana Smajlović, from Brussels 1991-1992
- Moni Žubi, from Kosovo War 1998-1999

=== Associates ===
Incomplete data:

- Abdulah Sidran, Bosnian writer
- Boris Dežulović, Croatian journalist
- Ćamil Sijarić, Bosnian writer
- Dario Džamonja, Bosnian journalist
- Darko V. Ribnikar, Serbian journalist
- Dragan Markovina, Bosnian-Croatian historian
- Dževad Sabljaković, Bosnian-Serbian journalist
- Gojko Berić, Bosnian journalist
- Ivo Andrić, Yugoslav writer
- Izet Sarajlić, Bosnian writer
- Meša Selimović, Yugoslav writer
- Mile Stojić, Bosnian-Croatian writer
- Miljenko Jergović, Bosnian-Croatian writer
- Muharem Bazdulj, Bosnian journalist
- Senad Avdić, Bosnian journalist
- Zija Dizdarević, Bosnian journalist

== List of awards won by Oslobođenje ==
- Order of the brotherhood and unity with golden wreath by Josip Broz Tito (SFR Yugoslavia, 1963)
- Order of Labour with the red flag (SFR Yugoslavia, 1983)
- Golden Mercury Award 1977 (International Committee for Development and International Cooperation, Rome)
- ZAVNOBiH Award (1978)
- Sixth of April Sarajevo Award (1984)
- The Paper of the Year in 1989 (Slobodna Dalmacija declared Oslobođenje the best newspaper in SFR Yugoslavia)
- The Paper of the Year Award in 1992 (BBC and Granada TV – United Kingdom)
- Andrei Sakharov Award for Human Rights 1993 (European Parliament – Strasbourg, France)
- Freedom Award in 1993 (Dagens nyheter, Stockholm; and Politiken Copenhagen)
- Oscar Romero Award 1993 (The Rothko Chapel – Houston, Texas)
- Nieman Foundation's Louis M. Lyons Award for conscience and integrity in journalism in 1993 (Harvard University – USA)
- Achievements in Journalism Award in 1993 (Inter Press Service, Rome – previously the International Journalism Award)
- University of Missouri Honor Medal in 1995 by the School of Journalism for continuous publication of the daily newspaper throughout the 1992–1995 siege of Sarajevo.
- Golden plaque of the MESS in 2015 for continuous devotion to culture in Bosnia and Herzegovina
- Johns Hopkins University Award for Contribution to Investigative Journalism in 2015
- The Paper of the Year in Bosnia and Herzegovina (2016)
- Special recognition of the Italian 22nd Giavera Festival for perseverance in the fight for human rights (2017)
- Gold plaque of the Association Education builds Bosnia and Herzegovina (2019)

== The Oslobođenje Journalist Awards ==
The Kemal Kurspahić International Journalist Award is recognition to journalists who published the story in Bosnian, Croatian, Montenegrin or Serbian. It is awarded every two years. The Hamza Bakšić Award is one and awarted only to journalists from the Oslobođenje Service Media Group. It is awarded annually. They were awarded for the first time in 2023 on the 80th anniversary of the Oslobođenje.

=== Kemal Kurspahić International Journalist Award ===
==== 2023 ====
- Nerzuk Ćurak, Opasni ljudi, tačno.net
- Edvin Kanka Ćudić, Grobnica nade, Danas
- Goran Dakić, Bajka o Baji, Dani

=== Jury members ===
Year(s)	Member #1	Member #2	Member#3	Member#4	Member#5	Member#6	Member#7
2023	Mujo Selimović	Vildana Selimbegović	Hajrudin Somun	Pavle Mijović	Saša Rukavina	Neven Anđelić	Ajla Terzić

=== Hamza Bakšić Journalist Award ===
==== 2023 ====
- Matea Jerković (for a series of articles about the rights of the LGBTIQ+ community) and Amir Papić (Bio jednom jedan ćiro)

==== 2024 ====
- Dženisa Zukančić (for researching the real estate market on all our platforms announced the problems of young people and some of the reasons why they leave Bosnia and Herzegovina) and Adnan Bajrović (Kandidat za rektora pao na prvom ispitu)

=== Jury members ===
Year(s)	Member #1	Member #2	Member#3	Member#4	Member#5	Member#6	Member#7
2023	Mujo Selimović	Vildana Selimbegović	Hajrudin Somun	Pavle Mijović	Saša Rukavina	Neven Anđelić	Ajla Terzić
