= Christine von Kohl =

Danish writer and human rights activist

Christine von Kohl (1923–2009) was a Danish journalist, writer, broadcaster, human rights activist and Balkan expert. She is remembered in particular for her articles and books on the breakup of Yugoslavia in the 1990s while she was based in Vienna. In 2002, she received the SEEMO human rights award.

== Early life ==
Born on 23 March 1923 in Berlin, Christine von Kohl was the daughter of the Danish film director and writer Louis Henri von Kohl (1882–1962) and his Austrian wife Lisa (Lisi) née Steindl (1888–1984).

== Career ==
Brought up in Berlin, in 1960 she moved to Austria as a foreign correspondent. Based in Belgrade from 1968 to 1985, she contributed to a variety of media, including Die Presse, Neue Zürcher Zeitung, Deutsche Welle and Deutschlandfunk as well as several Scandinavian news interests. Back in Vienna, from 1990 to 1994 she worked for the Helsinki Committee for Human Rights and established the Verein der Flüchtlinge und Vertriebenen aus Bosnien-Herzegowina in Österreich (Association for Refugees and Displaced Persons form Bosnia-Herzegovina in Austria). During the Yugoslav Wars in the 1990s, she was recognized across Europe as one of the most reliable radio and newspaper reporters on the Balkan conflicts.

Christine von Kohl died in Vienna on 23 January 2009.

== Selected publications ==
- Libal, Wolfgang; Kohl, Christine von (2000). Der Balkan: Stabilität oder Chaos in Europa (in German). Europa Verlag. ISBN 978-3-203-79535-5.
- Kohl, Christine von (1992). Kosovo: Balkans gordiske knude (in Danish). Det Udenrigspolitiske selskab. ISBN 87-89499-07-7.
- Kohl, Christine von (2003). Albanien (in German). C.H.Beck. ISBN 978-3-406-50902-5.
- Kohl, Christine von (2005). Balkan - europäischer Kulturraum (in German). Picus-Verlag. ISBN 978-3-85452-513-4.
- Kohl, Christine von (2008). Eine Dänin am Balkan: zwischen Kosova und Brüssel : kritische Skizzen (in German). Wieser. ISBN 978-3-85129-776-8.
