= Busije, Ribnik =

Busije Бусије
- Village
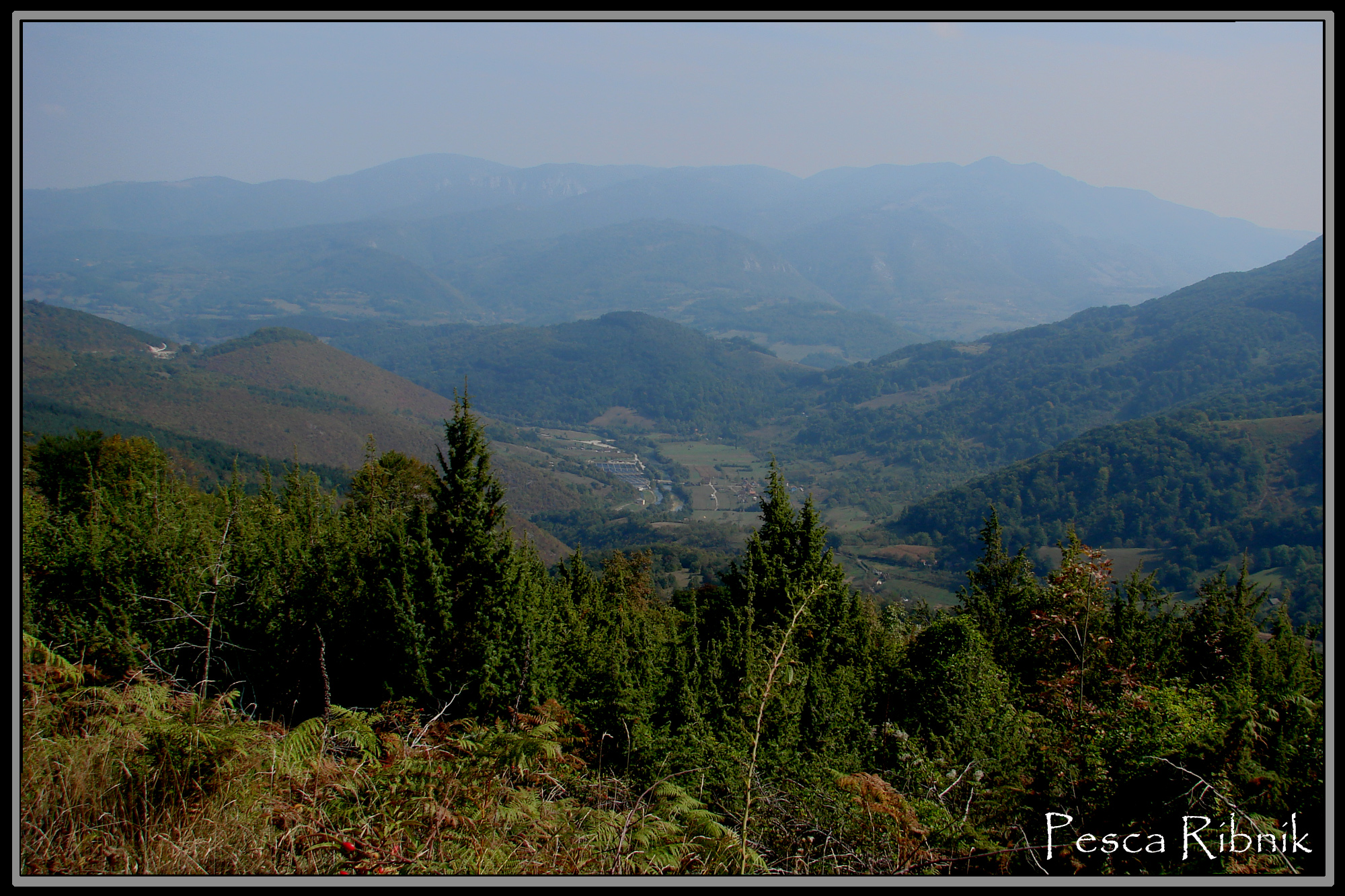

- Location within Republika Srpska Location within Bosnia and Herzegovina
- Coordinates: 44°23′31″N 16°46′37″E
- Country: Bosnia and Herzegovina
- Entity: Republika Srpska
- Municipality: Ribnik
- Time zone: UTC+1 (CET)
  - Summer (DST): UTC+2 (CEST)

Busije (Serbian Cyrillic: Бусије) is a village in the municipality of Ribnik, Republika Srpska, Bosnia and Herzegovina.
