= Senad Saletović =

Bosnia and Herzegovina footballer

Personal information
- Date of birth: 1 January 1968 (age 58)
- Place of birth: SFR Yugoslavia
- Position: Defender

Senior career*
Years	Team	Apps	(Gls)
1986–1987	Krivaja Zavidovići		
1987–1990	Bor	3+	(0+)
1991	Radnički Niš	2	(0)
- * Club domestic league appearances and goals

Senad Saletović (born 1 January 1968) is a Bosnian-Herzegovinian retired football defender.

== Club career ==
After playing in lower-league side Krivaja Zavidovići he moved to FK Bor playing in third level. His good performances there made him a move at the winter-break of the 1990–91 season to the Yugoslav First League side FK Radnički Niš.
