= Veselin Gatalo =

Herzegovinian Serb writer and poet

- Веселин Гатало
- Born: 16 December 1967 (age 58); Mostar, SR Bosnia and Herzegovina, SFR Yugoslavia
- Citizenship: Bosnia and Herzegovina, Croatia, Serbia
- Occupations: Television host, columnist
- Writing career
- Language: Serbo-Croatian

Veselin Gatalo (Serbian Cyrillic: Веселин Гатало; born 16 December 1967) is a writer and poet from Bosnia and Herzegovina.

== Biography ==
Veselin Gatalo was born to a Serb family in Mostar, Bosnia and Herzegovina, then part of Yugoslavia. He finished elementary school and high school in his birth town. He entered the Faculty of Engineering and Computer Science in Mostar, but didn't graduate as the Bosnian War started in 1992.

Gatalo is a public commentator and a columnist. He was one of the editors of the Reflex, a political show at the Televizija OBN. Gatalo wrote for a political magazine Status and weekly Republika, and later for Motrišta, Zarez, Album, NIN, Slobodna Bosna, Azra as well as internet portals like Buka, Bljesak.info and Poskok.info. He also wrote for the French magazine Hopala and the Czech magazine Kartki and others.

== Works ==
- Gatalo, Veselin (1998). Vrijeme mesinganih perli (in Serbian). Sarajevo: Naklada IPC.
- Gatalo, Veselin (2004). Siesta, Fiesta, Orgasmo, Riposo (in Serbian). Sarajevo-Zagreb: Naklada ZORO.
- Gatalo, Veselin (2005). Rambo, Drumski i Onaj treći (in Serbian). Sarajevo-Zagreb: Naklada ZORO.
- Gatalo, Veselin (2005). Ja sam pas... I zovem se Salvatore (in Serbian). Sarajevo: Naklada Šahinpašić.
- Gatalo, Veselin (2006). GETO (in Serbian). Zagreb: Naklada AGM.
- Gatalo, Veselin (2006). Kmezavi narednici (in Serbian). Sarajevo: Naklada Šahinpašić.
- Gatalo, Veselin (2007). Cefe Oxygen (in Serbian). Zagreb: Naklada WARP.
- Gatalo, Veselin (2008). Priče za nemirnu noć (in Serbian). Sarajevo: Naklada Planjax - IPC.
- Gatalo, Veselin (2008). Polja čemerike (in Serbian). Beograd: Naklada Samizdat B92.
- Gatalo, Veselin (2009). Vuk (in Serbian). Sarajevo: Naklada TKD - Šahinpašić.
- Gatalo, Veselin (2009). Salika (in Serbian). Sarajevo: Naklada Maunagić.
