= Ljiljan =

- Editor: Ismet Veladžić (1996)
- Categories: Political magazine
- Frequency: Weekly
- Circulation: 60,000
- Founded: 1990
- Final issue: 2005
- Based in: Sarajevo

Ljiljan was a Bosnian weekly news-political and cultural news magazine. It is named after the golden Bosnian lily, which is considered the national symbol of the Bosniak people. It was founded by the Party of Democratic Action (SDA) (Bosnian: Stranka demokratske akcije) in 1990 as a successor to Muslimanski Glas (Muslims' Voice), the official bulletin of the party. With the name change it obtained a formal editorial independence, though it still reflected conservative Bosniak political positions, close to the SDA party. For instance, figures connected to Ljiljan have been known to oppose mixed marriages between Bosniaks, Croats and Serbs, deeming them an imposition from the Socialist times. It was published in Sarajevo and distributed in the Federation of Bosnia and Herzegovina and abroad. In 1996 its circulation was 60,000 copies, of which 85% abroad.

In a 1998 study, Ljiljan was found to proactively employ Turkish, Arabic, and Persian loanwords over Slavic equivalents as a symbolic affirmation of Islamic identity. In a similar 2002 study, the magazine was also found, along with Dnevni avaz, which also has a Bosniak nationalist orientation, to favour a conservative approach to linguistic standards of the Bosnian language rather than liberally employing terms which are considered "Serbian" or "Croatian."
