= Slobodna Bosna =

Bosnian magazine

Slobodna Bosna: nezavisni informativni portal
- Editor: Senad Avdić
- Staff writers: Mirha Dedić, Mario Iličić, Samir Begović, Darko Omeragić, Maja Radević, Sanela Gojak, Tamara Nikčević
- Categories: Political magazine
- Frequency: Weekly (1991-2015) online (since 2000)
- Format: Online
- Publisher: BOSNA.BA d.o.o.
- Founded: 1991; 35 years ago
- First issue: 1991; 35 years ago
- Country: Bosnia and Herzegovina
- Based in: Sarajevo
- Language: Bosnian
- Website: www.slobodna-bosna.ba

Slobodna Bosna (Bosnian pronunciation: [slôbodnaː bôsna]; English: Free Bosnia) is an investigative weekly news magazine based in Sarajevo, Bosnia and Herzegovina. It was established 1991 as a print edition and in 2000 an online edition started to exist. The print edition was abolished in December 2015 and Slobodna Bosna now operates only as an online magazine.

== Profile ==
Before transferring to online space, Slobodna Bosna was one of the loudest and articulate critics of political figures, criminals and corruption in Bosnia and Herzegovina. The magazine's frequent investigations of corruption have led politicians to sue the editor-in-chief Senad Avdić. On 23 June 1999, Sarajevo Municipal Court sentenced Avdić to a two-month suspended jail term on charges of criminal libel. This led to the Committee to Protect Journalists to condemn the conviction and sentencing of Senad Avdić on criminal libel charges as a violation of all international norms of press freedom.

Before the changes in leadership of the rivalry magazine Dani and the transition of Slobodna Bosna to online space, these two magazines were seen as two most competent journalistic investigative hubs in Bosnia and Herzegovina.
