= Kemal Kurspahić =

Bosnian journalist (1946–2021)

Kemal Kurspahić Кемал Курспахић
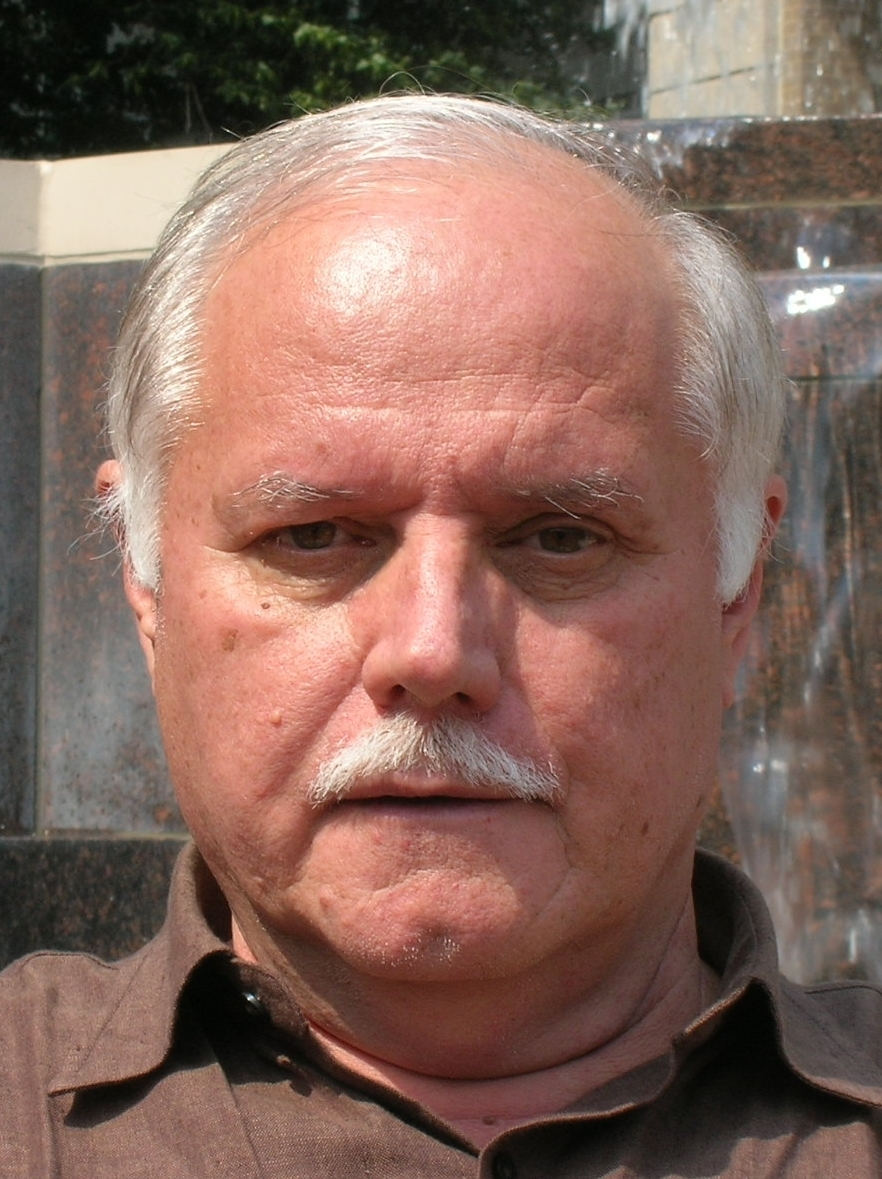
- Kurspahić in 2007
- Born: 1 December 1946; Mrkonjić Grad, PR Bosnia and Herzegovina, Yugoslavia
- Died: 17 September 2021 (aged 74); Washington, D.C., U.S.
- Education: University of Belgrade Lawyer; Harvard University Nieman Fellow (1994-1995)
- Occupations: Connection Newspapers Managing Editor (2007-present); Media in Democracy Institute Chairman and Founder (2007-present); UNODC Spokesman, Caribbean Regional Representative (2001-2006); Oslobođenje Editor-in-Chief Sarajevo (1989-1994)
- Notable credit(s): Award-winning editor, Four books, Op-Ed articles in major international dailies
- Spouse: Vesna Kurspahić (m. 1968; died 2021)
- Children: 2 sons
- Website: http://kemal.kurspahic.com

Kemal Kurspahić (Serbo-Croatian Cyrillic: Кемал Курспахић; 1 December 1946 – 17 September 2021) was a Bosnian journalist. He was managing editor of The Connection Newspapers in Alexandria, Virginia and founder of the media in Democracy Institute, dedicated to promoting higher standards in journalism in post-conflict societies and countries in transition to democracy. He won broad international recognition as the Editor-in-Chief of the Bosnian daily Oslobođenje, 1989-1994. In 2023 Oslobođenje established international journalist award after him.

== Early years ==
Kurspahić was born in Mrkonjić Grad. He attended elementary school in Croatia and Bosnia, before completing his high school in Sanski Most during which time he began working as a freelancer writer. He earned his academic degree from the University of Belgrade's Law School. He was the editor at the Belgrade weekly Student paper during the students’ unrest in Europe in 1968 and then became sports correspondent in Belgrade and sports editor in Sarajevo for the Bosnian daily Oslobođenje. He reported from the Olympic Games in Munich in 1972, Lake Placid in 1980 and Los Angeles in 1984 and from the 1974 Football World Cup in Germany.

== Career ==
Kurspahić served as Oslobođenje’s New York correspondent, 1981-1985. and became the editor-in-chief in Sarajevo 1989. In that role he led the paper through three battles for press freedom: liberating the paper from the one-party control, 1989–1991; defending the paper against the nationalist takeover and winning the Constitutional Court case for its independence in 1991: publishing every day during the siege of Sarajevo from the underground atomic bomb shelter on the front lines of the besieged Bosnian capital, 1992-95. During this period, he suffered an injury that left him with a lifelong limp when his car crashed while he was under sniper fire.Oslobođenje and Kurspahić have received some of the highest honors in journalism and human rights for maintaining the culture of ethnic and religious tolerance throughout the terror of the siege.

He has published articles in numerous international dailies, including The New York Times, The Washington Post, The International Herald Tribune, The Los Angeles Times, Die Zeit, El País, Neue Zuercher Zetung, Dagens nyheter and other publications. He has appeared on programs such as ABC's Nightline and Good Morning America, CBS's 60 Minutes, PBS News Hour with Jim Lehrer, as well as British, Canadian and German television. In addition to living in Bosnia, Croatia and Serbia, as well as the United States, he has lived and worked as a diplomat in Vienna, Austria and Barbados and visited 60 countries. In 1997, he became managing editor for the Connection Newspapers based in Alexandria, Virginia and served in that role until 2001 before resuming in 2007 until his passing.

== Diplomacy ==
For five and a half years, 2001–2006, Kurspahić worked for the United Nations Office on Drugs and Crime, first as the spokesman in Vienna, Austria and then as the Caribbean Regional Representative in Barbados, covering 29 states and territories. He was a spokesman for the United Nations Signing Conference for the Convention against Corruption in Mérida, Mexico in December 2003. In the Caribbean he worked with the regional governments, mostly on ministerial level, to promote regional cooperation against drug trafficking and organized crime.

== Death ==
Kurspahić died on 17 September 2021 in Reston, Virginia following a stroke. He is survived by his wife of 52 years Vesna and two sons. Two years later Oslobođenje established international journalist award after him.

== Books ==
He published four books:

- The White House in 1984 on the presidential elections in the United States (Oslobodjenje, Sarajevo, 1994)
- Letters from the War, the first book published in the besieged city of Sarajevo (Ideje, Sarajevo, 1992)
- As Long As Sarajevo Exists (Pamphleteer's Press, 1997)
- Prime Time Crime: Balkan Media in War and Peace (US Institute of Peace Press, 2003).

This book was also published in Sarajevo and Belgrade under the title Crime at 19:30 - Balkan Media in War and Peace.

== Awards and recognition ==
Kurspahić has received a number of prestigious international awards, including:

- South Eastern Europe Media Organization’s Dr. Erhard Busek Award for Better Understanding in the Region (SEEMO – Vienna, Austria, 2003);
- World Press Freedom Hero (International Press Institute - Vienna, Austria, 2000);
- 1993 International Editor of the Year (World Press Review - New York);
- 1992 Courage in Journalism Award in 1992 (International Women’s Media Foundation - Washington, D.C.);
- 1993 Bruno Kreisky Award for Human Rights (Dr Bruno Kreisky Foundation - Vienna, Austria).
