= Dani (magazine) =

Bosnian magazine

BH Dani
- Editor: Saša Rukavina
- Categories: Politics
- Frequency: Monthly
- Format: Online
- Publisher: Oslobođenje d.o.o.
- First issue: 1 September 1992; 34 years ago
- Country: Bosnia and Herzegovina
- Language: Bosnian
- Website: bhdani.oslobodjenje.ba

BH Dani is a Bosnian language magazine website based in Sarajevo. Until 2010, it was published as a weekly, and then as a monthly magazine. In 2023, the printed edition was replaced with a wholly online model of release.

== History ==
BH Dani, also known as Dani is a weekly politics magazine published in Sarajevo. The first issue of the magazine was distributed from 25 August 1992, during the first year of the Siege of Sarajevo. One of the editors-in-chief in the coming years was Senad Pećanin.

Dani continued its publication under harsh conditions throughout and despite the Siege. The magazine received the Award for Best Paper in Bosnia and Herzegovina in 1993 by the former Association of Journalists of BiH (today BH Novinari), award of the Open Society Foundation BIH and the Olof Palme Prize in 1998. The paper was financially supported by the Swedish Helsinki Committee, Press Now and the Open Society Foundations.

In 2010, the magazine was bought by Oslobođenje, when Pećanin stepped down as the editor-in-chief. Dani continues to be published with the current editor-in-chief Saša Rukavina.

In April 2023 the magazine issued the final printed edition before switching to a wholly online model of release. Chief editor Saša Rukavina reasoned that technology has advanced so much that printed newspapers can no longer compete with online portals and social media.

== Notable persons ==
=== Editors-in-Chief ===
- Senad Pećanin, 1992-2000
- Vildana Selimbegović, 2000–2003
- Emir Imamović Pirke, 2004-2005
- Vildana Selimbegović, 2005-2008
- Senad Pećanin, 2008-2010
- Dženana Karup-Druško, 2010-2013
- Šaša Rukavina 2013-present

=== Columnists ===
- Semezdin Mehmedinović, Bosnian writer
- Aleksandar Hemon, Bosnian-American writer
- Miljenko Jergović, Bosnian writer
- Karim Zaimović, Bosnian writer
- Nerzuk Ćurak, Bosnian journalist
- Mile Stojić, Bosnian writer
- Esad Hećimović, Bosnian journalist
- Eliezer Papo, Bosnian rabbi
- Ivan Lovrenović, Bosnian journalist

== Sister publications ==
- Oslobođenje - daily newspaper
- Auto Dani - a monthly car magazine supplement
- Ljepota & Zdravlje - a monthly health and beauty magazine supplement
- Biblioteka Dani - a book publishing house
