= Raduša =

Raduša can refer to:

- Raduša (Tutin), a village in the Tutin municipality, Serbia
- Raduša (Ub), a village in the Ub municipality, Serbia
- Raduša (Užice), a village in the Užice municipality, Serbia
- Raduša, Tešanj, a village in the Tešanj municipality, Bosnia and Herzegovina
- Raduša (mountain), in central-western Bosnia and Herzegovina
- Raduša, Saraj, village in Macedonia, near Skopje
