= Lončari, Tešanj =

Village in Tešanj, Bosnia and Herzegovina

Lončari
- Location within Bosnia and Herzegovina
- Coordinates: 44.6938872°N 17.9081654°E
- Country: Bosnia and Herzegovina
- Entity: Republika Srpska; Federation of Bosnia and Herzegovina
- Region Canton: Sarajevo; Zenica-Doboj
- Municipality: Tešanj; Teslić; Usora

Area
  - Total: 1.25 sq mi (3.23 km^{2})

Population (2013)
  - Total: 158
  - Density: 127/sq mi (48.9/km^{2})
- Time zone: UTC+1 (CET)
  - Summer (DST): UTC+2 (CEST)

Lončari is a village in the municipalities of Teslić (Republika Srpska), Usora and Tešanj, Bosnia and Herzegovina.

== Demographics ==
According to the 2013 census, its population was 158, with 138 living in the Tešanj part, 4 (all Croats) living in the Usora part and 16 living in the Teslić part.

Ethnicity in 2013
Ethnicity	Number	Percentage
Croats	87	55.1%
Bosniaks	68	43.0%
Serbs	3	1.9%
Total	158	100%
