= Vrela =

Vrela may refer to:

- Vrela, Teslić, a village in northern Bosnia and Herzegovina near Teslić and Tešanj
- Vrela, Tešanj, a village in northern Bosnia and Herzegovina near Tešanj and Teslić
- Vrela, Visoko, a village in central Bosnia and Herzegovina
- Vrela Ribnička, a neighbourhood of Podgorica, Montenegro
- Vrela, Žabljak, a village in Žabljak Municipality, Montenegro
