= Attack on Teslić =

1994 battle during the Bosnian war

- Part of Bosnian War
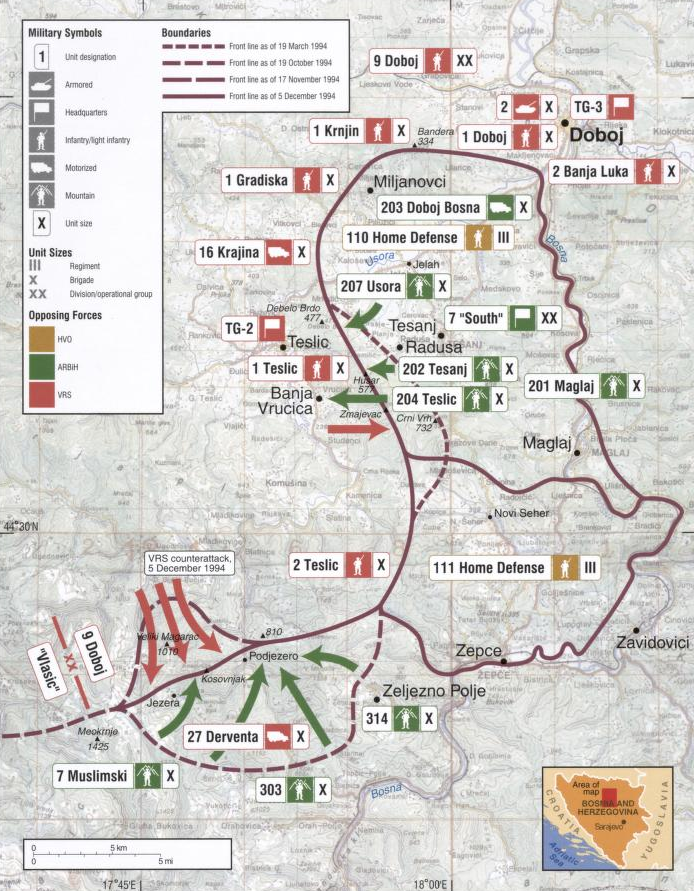
Date	3 October 1994 — December 1994
Location	Teslić, Bosnia and Herzegovina
Result	Army of Republika Srpska victory: Teslić protected until the end of the war

Belligerents
Army of Republika Srpska	Republic of Bosnia and Herzegovina

Commanders and leaders
Slavko Lisica	Unknown

Units involved
Army of Republika Srpska; "Drina Corps"	ARBiH; 3rd Corps (Army of the Republic of Bosnia and Herzegovina)

Strength
1,500 Men	Around 2,000 Men

Casualties and losses
Unknown	Unknown

The Attack on Teslić was an attempt by the Army of the Republic of Bosnia and Herzegovina (ARBiH) to take Teslić and the surrounding settlements from the Army of Republika Srpska (VRS) in October 1994 during the Bosnian War. All attacks on the city were countered by the VRS.

== Prelude ==
After the signing of the Washington Agreement in late march 1994, which ended the Croat-Bosniak War in the Tešanj-Maglaj enclave, the ARBiH saved significant forces that were on the front lines against the 111th Croatian Defence Council (HVO) brigade from Žepče and transferred them to the Serb front line towards Teslić.

In the Tešanjsko-Maglaj enclave of the ARBiH as part of the 7th TG "South" until the middle of 1994 (it refers to the 2nd and 3rd Corps of the ARBiH), included four brigades and one independent battalion. In the northeast of the enclave there was also the 110th brigade of HVO "Usora" (held to the Muslim side) with 2,000 men. With the signing of the Muslim-Croat peace, an offensive had been launched on Teslić by the ARBiH earlier in the year that proved stagnant. In October, they were better prepared to launch a new attack.

== Timeline of the attack ==
The Bosnian Serb side realized that there was about to be a struggle for Teslić, located only 5 km from the front line, while the 1st Krajina Corps was facing pressure from the front to the west. The Army of Republika Srpska (VRS) was ready to hold on to Teslić, Banja Vrućica and the surrounding settlements. The most powerful and well-prepared attack on VRS for Teslić began on October 3 and lasted a little more than a week. Operational Group "North" of the 3rd Corps of the ARBiH was involved in the attack.

The 202nd Mountain Brigade of the ARBiH began the attack and went for the positions of the 1st Teslić Brigade and advances to the suburbs of Teslić and Banja Vrućica and captures the Husar Peak. The ARBiH targeted settlements near Teslić with artillery attacks, which did not cause much damage, as the VRS resisted the approach the town of Teslić. But with a counteroffensive on October 10 and 11, the VRS regained the lost lines. These lines were held to until the end of the war.

Fighting however, continued and lasted for nearly two months. While the ARBiH advance towards the north was stopped, the 3rd Corps attack in the south began making gains. Operational Group North took 50 km² of territory along a 10 km-wide front. From 8 to 17 November, they gained an additional 30 km². Although the ultimate goal of Teslić was not reached, the 3rd Corps proved to be competent in its operational abilities within their area of responsibility and managed to force the VRS into a defensive posture.

== Sources ==
- Central Intelligence Agency, Office of Russian and European Analysis (2002). Balkan Battlegrounds: A Military History of the Yugoslav Conflict, 1990–1995, Volume 1. Washington, D.C.: Central Intelligence Agency. ISBN 978-0-16-066472-4.
