= Tešanjka =

Village in Tešanj, Bosnia and Herzegovina

- Location within Bosnia and Herzegovina
- Coordinates: 44.6727263°N 18.0118275°E
- Country: Bosnia and Herzegovina
- Entity: Federation of Bosnia and Herzegovina
- Canton: Zenica-Doboj
- Municipality: Tešanj; Usora

Area
  - Total: 0.54 sq mi (1.41 km^{2})

Population (2013)
  - Total: 960
  - Density: 1,800/sq mi (680/km^{2})
- Time zone: UTC+1 (CET)
  - Summer (DST): UTC+2 (CEST)

Tešanjka is a village in the municipalities of Usora and Tešanj, Bosnia and Herzegovina.

== Demographics ==
According to the 2013 census, its population was 960, with 429 living in the Tešanj part and 531 living in the Usora part.

Ethnicity in 2013
Ethnicity	Number	Percentage
Bosniaks	473	49.3%
Croats	441	45.9%
Serbs	7	0.7%
other/undeclared	39	4.1%
Total	960	100%
