= Miljanovci =

Village in Tešanj, Bosnia and Herzegovina

- Location within Bosnia and Herzegovina
- Coordinates: 44.7004797°N 17.9278524°E
- Country: Bosnia and Herzegovina
- Entity: Republika Srpska; Federation of Bosnia and Herzegovina
- Region Canton: Doboj; Zenica-Doboj
- Municipality: Doboj; Tešanj; Usora

Area
  - Total: 2.43 sq mi (6.30 km^{2})

Population (2013)
  - Total: 817
  - Density: 336/sq mi (130/km^{2})
- Time zone: UTC+1 (CET)
  - Summer (DST): UTC+2 (CEST)

Miljanovci is a village in the municipalities of Usora and Tešanj, Bosnia and Herzegovina.

== Demographics ==
According to the 2013 census, its population was 817, with 797 living in the Tešanj part, none living in the Doboj part and 20 living in the Usora part.

Ethnicity in 2013
Ethnicity	Number	Percentage
Bosniaks	798	97.7%
Croats	15	1.8%
other/undeclared	4	0.5%
Total	817	100%
