= Kopice (Maglaj) =

Village in Maglaj, Bosnia and Herzegovina

- Village
- Location within Bosnia and Herzegovina
- Country: Bosnia and Herzegovina
- Entity: Republika Srpska; Federation of Bosnia and Herzegovina
- Region Canton: Doboj; Zenica-Doboj
- Municipality: Teslić; Maglaj

Area
  - Total: 4.20 sq mi (10.88 km^{2})

Population (2013)
  - Total: 1,227
  - Density: 292.1/sq mi (112.8/km^{2})
- Time zone: UTC+1 (CET)
  - Summer (DST): UTC+2 (CEST)

Kopice is a village in the municipalities of Teslić (Republika Srpska) and Maglaj, Zenica-Doboj Canton, Federation of Bosnia and Herzegovina, Bosnia and Herzegovina.

== Demographics ==
According to the 2013 census, its population was 1,227 with none living in the Teslić part thus all in the Maglaj part.

Ethnicity in 2013
Ethnicity	Number	Percentage
Bosniaks	1,221	99.5%
other/undeclared	6	0.5%
Total	1,227	100%
