= Orašje Planje =

Village in Tešanj, Bosnia and Herzegovina

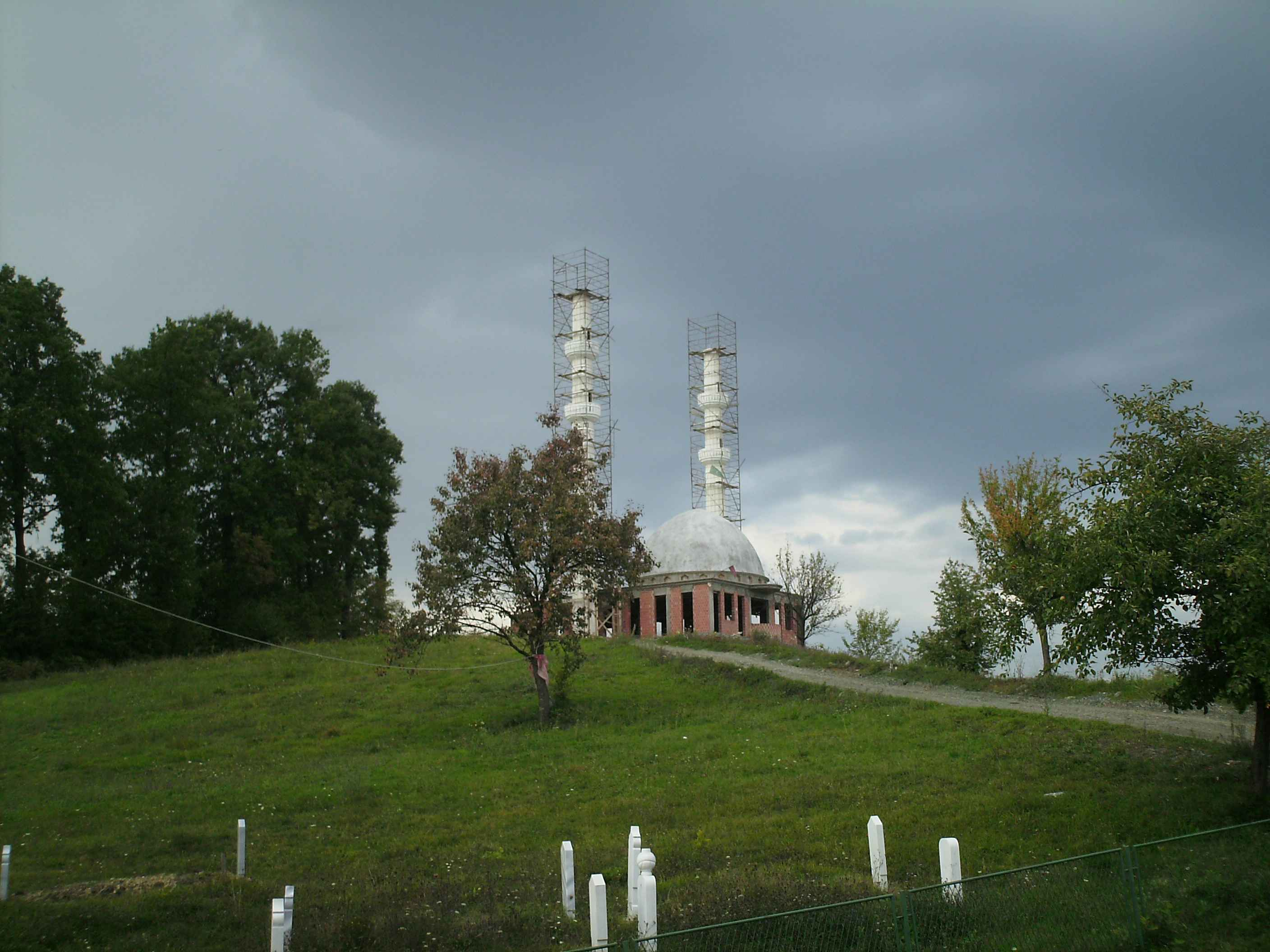

- Location within Bosnia and Herzegovina
- Coordinates: 44.6191745°N 17.9038588°E
- Country: Bosnia and Herzegovina
- Entity: Republika Srpska; Federation of Bosnia and Herzegovina
- Region Canton: Sarajevo; Zenica-Doboj
- Municipality: Tešanj; Teslić

Area
  - Total: 1.97 sq mi (5.10 km^{2})

Population (2013)
  - Total: 900
  - Density: 460/sq mi (180/km^{2})
- Time zone: UTC+1 (CET)
  - Summer (DST): UTC+2 (CEST)

Orašje Planje is a village in the municipalities of Teslić (Republika Srpska) and Tešanj, Bosnia and Herzegovina.

== Demographics ==
According to the 2013 census, its population was 900, all living in Tešanj.

Ethnicity in 2013
Ethnicity	Number	Percentage
Bosniaks	895	99.4%
Croats	1	0.1%
Serbs	1	0.1%
other/undeclared	3	0.3%
Total	900	100%
