= Rosulje =

Rosulje may refer to:

- Rosulje (Bugojno), a village in Bosnia and Herzegovina
- Rosulje (Gornji Vakuf), a village in Bosnia and Herzegovina
- Rosulje (Pale), a village in Bosnia and Herzegovina
- Rosulje, Tešanj, a village in Bosnia and Herzegovina
