= Ularice =

Ularice Уларице
- Village
- Location within Bosnia and Herzegovina
- Coordinates: 44°42′32″N 18°00′47″E
- Country: Bosnia and Herzegovina
- Entity: Federation of Bosnia and Herzegovina
- Canton: Zenica-Doboj
- Municipality: Usora

Area
  - Total: 2.20 sq mi (5.70 km^{2})

Population (2013)
  - Total: 777
  - Density: 353/sq mi (136/km^{2})
- Time zone: UTC+1 (CET)
  - Summer (DST): UTC+2 (CEST)

Ularice (Cyrillic: Уларице) is a village in the municipality of Usora, Bosnia and Herzegovina.

== Demographics ==
According to the 2013 census, its population was 777.

Ethnicity in 2013
Ethnicity	Number	Percentage
Croats	761	97.9%
Serbs	9	1.2%
Bosniaks	3	0.4%
other/undeclared	4	0.5%
Total	777	100%
