= Bobare =

Bobare may refer to:

- Bobare, Bosnia and Herzegovina, a village near Tešanj
- Bobare, Croatia, a village near Okučani
- Bobare, Venezuela, a Spanish mission near Barquisimeto
