= Momčilo =

Momcilo or Momčilo (Cyrillic: Момчило) is a masculine given name of South Slavic origin. It is often found in Serbia and Montenegro. Notable people with the name include:

- Momchil (died 1345), Bulgarian soldier
- Momčilo Bajagić, Serbian rock musician
- Momčilo Bošković (born 1951), retired Serbian footballer
- Momčilo Cemović (1928–2001), the President of the Executive Council of the Socialist Republic of Montenegro in 1978–1982
- Momčilo Đokić (1911–1983), Serbian football player and manager
- Momčilo Đujić (1907–1999), Serbian commander in the Chetnik movement during World War II
- Momčilo Gavrić (soldier) (1906–1993), youngest soldier in World War I
- Momčilo Gavrić (footballer) (1938–2010), Yugoslav and American footballer
- Momčilo Gruban (born 1961), Bosnian war criminal
- Momčilo Kapor (1937–2010), Serbian novelist and painter
- Momčilo Krajišnik (1945–2020), Bosnian Serb politician convicted of murder and crimes against humanity during the Bosnian war (1992–1995)
- Momčilo Otašević (born 1990), Montenegrin actor
- Momčilo Nastasijević (born 1894), Serbian poet, novelist and dramatist
- Momčilo Ninčić (1876–1949), Serbian politician and economist, president of the League of Nations (1926–27)
- Momčilo Perišić (born 1944), Serbian general; Chief of the General Staff of the Yugoslav Army until 1998
- Momčilo Rajin (born 1954), Serbian art and music critic
- Momčilo Spremić (born 1937), Serbian historian and member of the Serbian Academy of Science and Arts
- Momcilo Stojanovic (1947–2010), NASL and Canadian international soccer forward
- Momčilo Tapavica (1872–1949), Serbian tennis player, weightlifter, wrestler and architect
- Momčilo Vukotić (1950–2021), Serbian football manager and a former player
- Momčilo Vuksanović (Montenegrin politician) (born 1955), Montenegrin educator and Serb minority leader

== See also ==
- Tombstones of Duke Momčilo, group of three medieval tombstones about southeast of Teslić in Bosnia and Herzegovina
- Momčilović
- Staro Momčilovo
- Novo Momčilovo
