= Piljužići =

Village in Tešanj, Bosnia and Herzegovina

- Location within Bosnia and Herzegovina
- Coordinates: 44.6779198°N 17.9165626°E
- Country: Bosnia and Herzegovina
- Entity: Republika Srpska; Federation of Bosnia and Herzegovina
- Region Canton: Sarajevo; Zenica-Doboj
- Municipality: Tešanj; Teslić

Area
  - Total: 2.02 sq mi (5.24 km^{2})

Population (2013)
  - Total: 1,835
  - Density: 907/sq mi (350/km^{2})
- Time zone: UTC+1 (CET)
  - Summer (DST): UTC+2 (CEST)

Piljužići is a village in the municipalities of Teslić (Republika Srpska) and Tešanj, Bosnia and Herzegovina.

== Demographics ==
According to the 2013 census, its population was 1,835, with 1,823 living in the Tešanj part and 12 living in the Teslić part.

Ethnicity in 2013
Ethnicity	Number	Percentage
Bosniaks	1,715	93.5%
Croats	96	5.2%
Serbs	1	0.1%
other/undeclared	23	1.3%
Total	1,835	100%
