= Kraševo =

Village in Tešanj, Bosnia and Herzegovina

- Location within Bosnia and Herzegovina
- Coordinates: 44.6872664°N 18.0247449°E
- Country: Bosnia and Herzegovina
- Entity: Federation of Bosnia and Herzegovina
- Canton: Zenica-Doboj
- Municipality: Tešanj; Usora

Area
  - Total: 1.31 sq mi (3.38 km^{2})

Population (2013)
  - Total: 1,437
  - Density: 1,100/sq mi (425/km^{2})
- Time zone: UTC+1 (CET)
  - Summer (DST): UTC+2 (CEST)

Kraševo is a village in the municipalities of Usora and Tešanj, Bosnia and Herzegovina.

== Demographics ==
According to the 2013 census, its population was 1,437, with 1,430 living in the Tešanj part and 7 Bosniaks living in the Usora part.

Ethnicity in 2013
Ethnicity	Number	Percentage
Bosniaks	1,366	95.1%
Croats	57	4.0%
Serbs	1	0.1%
other/undeclared	13	0.9%
Total	1,437	100%
