= Papratnica =

- Village
- Location within Bosnia and Herzegovina
- Coordinates: 44.4284059°N 17.9882094°E
- Country: Bosnia and Herzegovina
- Entity: Republika Srpska; Federation of Bosnia and Herzegovina
- Region Canton: Doboj; Zenica-Doboj
- Municipality: Žepče; Teslić

Area
  - Total: 11.38 sq mi (29.48 km^{2})

Population (2013)
  - Total: 1,192
  - Density: 104.7/sq mi (40.43/km^{2})
- Time zone: UTC+1 (CET)
  - Summer (DST): UTC+2 (CEST)

Papratnica is a village in the municipalities of Teslić (Republika Srpska) and Žepče, Bosnia and Herzegovina.

== Demographics ==
According to the 2013 census, its population was 1,192, all of them living in the Žepče part, thus none in the Republika Srpska part.

Ethnicity in 2013
Ethnicity	Number	Percentage
Croats	1,186	99.5%
Serbs	5	0.4%
Bosniaks	1	0.1%
Total	1,192	100%
