= Mrkotić =

Village in Tešanj, Bosnia and Herzegovina

- Location within Bosnia and Herzegovina
- Coordinates: 44.6294609°N 17.8965492°E
- Country: Bosnia and Herzegovina
- Entity: Republika Srpska; Federation of Bosnia and Herzegovina
- Region Canton: Sarajevo; Zenica-Doboj
- Municipality: Tešanj; Teslić

Area
  - Total: 2.42 sq mi (6.27 km^{2})

Population (2013)
  - Total: 1,349
  - Density: 557/sq mi (215/km^{2})
- Time zone: UTC+1 (CET)
  - Summer (DST): UTC+2 (CEST)

Mrkotić is a village in the municipalities of Teslić (Republika Srpska) and Tešanj, Bosnia and Herzegovina.

== Demographics ==
According to the 2013 census, its population was 1,349, with 1,323 living in the Tešanj part and 26 Serbs living in the Teslić part.

Ethnicity in 2013
Ethnicity	Number	Percentage
Bosniaks	1,302	96.5%
Serbs	27	2.0%
Croats	4	0.3%
other/undeclared	16	1.2%
Total	1,349	100%
