= Džemilić Planje =

Village in Tešanj, Bosnia and Herzegovina

- Location within Bosnia and Herzegovina
- Coordinates: 44.6087318°N 17.9278795°E
- Country: Bosnia and Herzegovina
- Entity: Republika Srpska; Federation of Bosnia and Herzegovina
- Region Canton: Sarajevo; Zenica-Doboj
- Municipality: Tešanj; Teslić

Area
  - Total: 2.64 sq mi (6.85 km^{2})

Population (2013)
  - Total: 1,141
  - Density: 431/sq mi (167/km^{2})
- Time zone: UTC+1 (CET)
  - Summer (DST): UTC+2 (CEST)

Džemilić Planje is a village in the municipalities of Teslić (Republika Srpska) and Tešanj, Bosnia and Herzegovina.

== Demographics ==
According to the 2013 census, its population was 1,141, with all living in the Tešanj part thus none living in the Teslić part.

Ethnicity in 2013
Ethnicity	Number	Percentage
Bosniaks	1,119	98.1%
Serbs	4	0.4%
other/undeclared	18	1.6%
Total	1,141	100%
