= Omanjska =

- Village
- Location within Bosnia and Herzegovina
- Coordinates: 44.6867944°N 17.9519391°E
- Country: Bosnia and Herzegovina
- Entity: Republika Srpska; Federation of Bosnia and Herzegovina
- Region Canton: Doboj; Zenica-Doboj
- Municipality: Doboj; Usora

Area
  - Total: 3.84 sq mi (9.94 km^{2})

Population (2013)
  - Total: 959
  - Density: 250/sq mi (96.5/km^{2})
- Time zone: UTC+1 (CET)
  - Summer (DST): UTC+2 (CEST)

Omanjska is a village in the municipalities of Doboj (Republika Srpska) and Usora, Bosnia and Herzegovina.

== Demographics ==
According to the 2013 census, its population was 959, with only 6 living in the Doboj part, and 953 living in the Usora part

Ethnicity in 2013
Ethnicity	Number	Percentage
Croats	947	98.7%
Serbs	11	1.1%
other/undeclared	1	0.1%
Total	953	100%
