= Novi Miljanovci =

Village in Tešanj, Bosnia and Herzegovina

- Location within Bosnia and Herzegovina
- Coordinates: 44.6933113°N 17.9343145°E
- Country: Bosnia and Herzegovina
- Entity: Federation of Bosnia and Herzegovina
- Canton: Zenica-Doboj
- Municipality: Tešanj; Usora

Area
  - Total: 3.24 sq mi (8.39 km^{2})

Population (2013)
  - Total: 2,035
  - Density: 628/sq mi (243/km^{2})
- Time zone: UTC+1 (CET)
  - Summer (DST): UTC+2 (CEST)

Novi Miljanovci is a village in the municipalities of Usora and Tešanj, Bosnia and Herzegovina.

== Demographics ==
According to the 2013 census, its population was 2,035, with 1,999 living in the Tešanj part and 36 living in the Usora part.

Ethnicity in 2013
Ethnicity	Number	Percentage
Bosniaks	2,003	98.4%
Croats	31	1.5%
Serbs	1	0.0%
Total	2,035	100%
