= Jevadžije =

Village in Tešanj, Bosnia and Herzegovina

- Location within Bosnia and Herzegovina
- Coordinates: 44.6386977°N 17.9490583°E
- Country: Bosnia and Herzegovina
- Entity: Federation of Bosnia and Herzegovina
- Canton: Zenica-Doboj
- Municipality: Tešanj

Area
  - Total: 0.89 sq mi (2.30 km^{2})

Population (2013)
  - Total: 570
  - Density: 640/sq mi (250/km^{2})
- Time zone: UTC+1 (CET)
  - Summer (DST): UTC+2 (CEST)

Jevadžije is a village in the municipality of Tešanj, Bosnia and Herzegovina.

== Demographics ==
According to the 2013 census, its population was 570.

Ethnicity in 2013
| Ethnicity | Number | Percentage |
|---|---|---|
| Bosniaks | 516 | 90.5% |
| Croats | 24 | 4.2% |
| Serbs | 4 | 0.7% |
| other/undeclared | 26 | 4.6% |
| Total | 570 | 100% |
