= Dragan Bogdanić =

Bosnian politician

- Born: 5 July 1965 (age 60); Teslić, Bosnia and Herzegovina, Yugoslavia
- Office: Minister of Health of Republika Srpska
- Predecessor: Slobodan Stanić
- Political party: Alliance of Independent Social Democrats (SNSD)

Dragan Bogdanić (born 5 July 1965 in Teslic, Yugoslavia) is a Bosnian Serb politician and former Health Minister of Republika Srpska. Previously, he was a CEO of Banja Vrucica, a medical center in Bosnia and Herzegovina.

He studied medicine in Banja Luka and Belgrade.

He is married and has one child.
