= Potočani, Tešanj =

Village in Tešanj, Bosnia and Herzegovina

Potočani
- Location within Bosnia and Herzegovina
- Coordinates: 44.640378°N 17.935763°E
- Country: Bosnia and Herzegovina
- Entity: Federation of Bosnia and Herzegovina
- Canton: Zenica-Doboj
- Municipality: Tešanj

Area
  - Total: 1.25 sq mi (3.23 km^{2})

Population (2013)
  - Total: 1,029
  - Density: 825/sq mi (319/km^{2})
- Time zone: UTC+1 (CET)
  - Summer (DST): UTC+2 (CEST)

Potočani is a village in the municipality of Tešanj, Bosnia and Herzegovina.

== Demographics ==
According to the 2013 census, its population was 1,029.

Ethnicity in 2013
Ethnicity	Number	Percentage
Bosniaks	783	76.1%
Croats	230	22.4%
Serbs	1	0.1%
other/undeclared	15	1.5%
Total	1,029	100%
