= Trepče =

Village in Tešanj, Bosnia and Herzegovina

- Location within Bosnia and Herzegovina
- Coordinates: 44.6215688°N 18.0309677°E
- Country: Bosnia and Herzegovina
- Entity: Federation of Bosnia and Herzegovina
- Canton: Zenica-Doboj
- Municipality: Tešanj

Area
  - Total: 3.23 sq mi (8.37 km^{2})

Population (2013)
  - Total: 1,593
  - Density: 493/sq mi (190/km^{2})
- Time zone: UTC+1 (CET)
  - Summer (DST): UTC+2 (CEST)

Trepče is a village in the municipality of Tešanj, Bosnia and Herzegovina.

== Demographics ==
According to the 2013 census, its population was 1,593.

Ethnicity in 2013
Ethnicity	Number	Percentage
Bosniaks	1,575	98.9%
Croats	10	0.6%
other/undeclared	8	0.5%
Total	1,593	100%
