= Momčilović =

Momčilović (Cyrillic script: Момчиловић) is a Serbian patronymic surname derived from a masculine given name Momčilo. It may refer to:

- Ivica Momčilović (born 1967), football manager
- Marko Momčilović (born 1987), footballer
