= Mekiš, Tešanj =

Village in Tešanj, Bosnia and Herzegovina

Mekiš
- Location within Bosnia and Herzegovina
- Coordinates: 44.5808186°N 17.9815133°E
- Country: Bosnia and Herzegovina
- Entity: Federation of Bosnia and Herzegovina
- Canton: Zenica-Doboj
- Municipality: Tešanj

Area
  - Total: 2.07 sq mi (5.36 km^{2})

Population (2013)
  - Total: 513
  - Density: 248/sq mi (95.7/km^{2})
- Time zone: UTC+1 (CET)
  - Summer (DST): UTC+2 (CEST)

Mekiš is a village in the municipality of Tešanj, Bosnia and Herzegovina.

== Demographics ==
According to the 2013 census, its population was 513.

Ethnicity in 2013
Ethnicity	Number	Percentage
Bosniaks	486	94.7%
Serbs	18	3.5%
Croats	4	0.8%
other/undeclared	5	1.0%
Total	513	100%
