= Šije, Bosnia and Herzegovina =

Village in Tešanj, Bosnia and Herzegovina

Šije
- Location within Bosnia and Herzegovina
- Coordinates: 44.6451518°N 18.0509514°E
- Country: Bosnia and Herzegovina
- Entity: Federation of Bosnia and Herzegovina
- Canton: Zenica-Doboj
- Municipality: Tešanj

Area
  - Total: 3.59 sq mi (9.31 km^{2})

Population (2013)
  - Total: 2,582
  - Density: 718/sq mi (277/km^{2})
- Time zone: UTC+1 (CET)
  - Summer (DST): UTC+2 (CEST)

Šije is a village in the municipality of Tešanj, Bosnia and Herzegovina.

== Demographics ==
According to the 2013 census, its population was 2,582.

Ethnicity in 2013
Ethnicity	Number	Percentage
Bosniaks	2,535	98.2%
other/undeclared	47	1.8%
Total	2,582	100%
