= Offensive on Teslić (1994) =

- Part of the Bosnian War
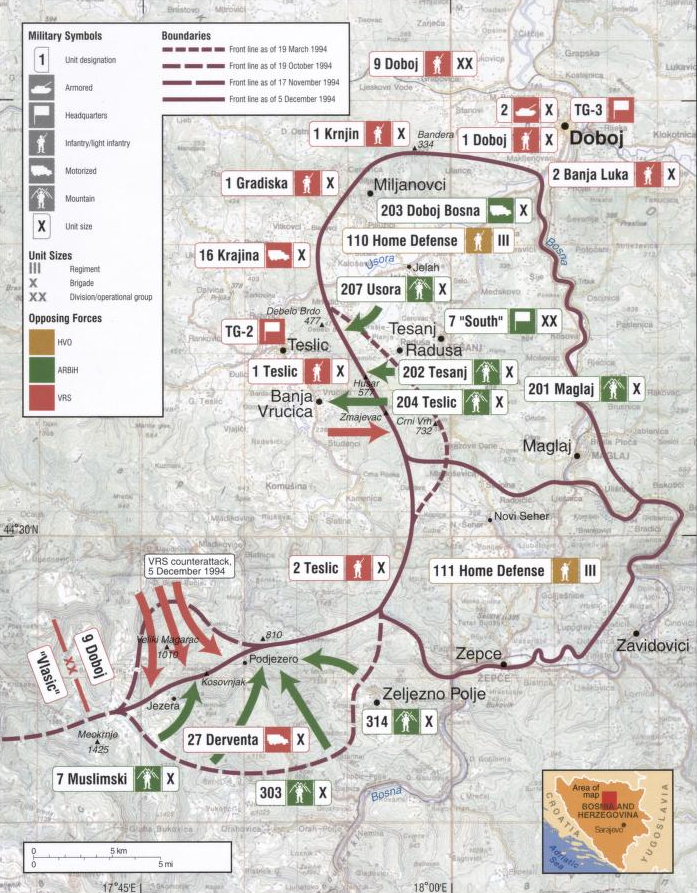
Date	March 23 – May 22, 1994
Location	Teslić, Bosnia and Herzegovina
Result	Army of Republika Srpska victory: 2 HVO tanks are destroyed. ARBiH and HVO withdraw from villages close to Teslić

Commanders and leaders
Slavko Lisica	Refik Lendo

Units involved
Army of Republika Srpska	Army of the Republic of Bosnia and Herzegovina; Croatian Defence Council

Casualties and losses
Unknown	Unknown

The Offensive on Teslić (1994) was the initial assault by the Army of the Republic of Bosnia and Herzegovina (ARBiH) on the town of Teslić during the Bosnian War.

From March to April 1994, ARBiH forces attempted to capture the city, but only managed to move 2 km closer to it. In May, despite receiving assistance from the Croatian Defence Council (HVO), they could not achieve their goal. Subsequent attempts to capture the city failed.

== Flow of the Battle ==
After the signing of the Washington Agreement in March 1994 which ended the Croat-Bosniak War, the Army of the Republic of Bosnia and Herzegovina (ARBiH) transferred significant forces that had been fighting on the front lines against the 111th Croatian Defence Council (HVO) brigade from Žepče to the Serbian front line towards Teslić. In the Tešanjsko-Maglaj enclave of the ARBiH as part of the 7th TG "South" until the middle of 1994 both the 2nd corps and 3rd corps of the ARBiH were present. It included four brigades and one independent battalion, for a total of about 10,000 fighters. In the northeast of the enclave, there was also the 110th brigade of the HVO "Usora" (retained to the Muslim side) with 2,000 men.

With the signing of the Muslim-Croat peace, the Serbian side realized that the town of Teslić was in danger, because it was only 7 km from the front line, and the 1st Krajina Corps of the Army of Republika Srpska (VRS) strengthened its defense on the western front line towards the city. The city was directly defended by the 2nd Tactical Group, 16th Krajiška Motorized No. north of Teslić, with the 1st Gradiška and 1st Krnjin brigades, and south of the city the 1st and 2nd Teslić brigades with part of the 27th Dervetan Motorized brigade. The 1st battalion of the military police and one reconnaissance-sabotage company remained in reserve. On 19 March 1994, the truce between the ARBiH and the HVO came into force, and already on March 23, the 204th Teslić Mountain Brigade of the ARBiH (made up of Muslim refugees from Teslić) attacked the positions of the 1st Teslić Brigade of the VRS. By March 26, Muslim forces surrounded the Husar hill (577 m.) and sporadic fighting continued until April, but the ARBiH failed to get closer than 5 km. to Teslić. On May 22, the ARBiH resumed its offensive, this time their former adversary the 110th HVO brigade, sent two tanks to participate in the attack. However, they were not able to reach their goal. The 1st Teslić Brigade of the VRS stopped the advance of the ARBiH south of the city and, with a successful fight, prevented the enemy from breaking into the Velika Usora river valley on the way to Teslić.

== Sources ==
- Central Intelligence Agency, Office of Russian and European Analysis (2002). Balkan Battlegrounds: A Military History of the Yugoslav Conflict, 1990–1995, Volume 1. Washington, D.C.: Central Intelligence Agency. ISBN 978-0-16-066472-4.
- Central Intelligence Agency, Office of Russian and European Analysis (2002). Balkan Battlegrounds: A Military History of the Yugoslav Conflict, 1990–1995, Volume 2. Washington, D.C.: Central Intelligence Agency. ISBN 978-0-16-066472-4.
