= Ripna =

Village in Tešanj, Bosnia and Herzegovina

- Location within Bosnia and Herzegovina
- Coordinates: 44.6053822°N 18.0232953°E
- Country: Bosnia and Herzegovina
- Entity: Federation of Bosnia and Herzegovina
- Canton: Zenica-Doboj
- Municipality: Tešanj

Area
  - Total: 0.93 sq mi (2.41 km^{2})

Population (2013)
  - Total: 155
  - Density: 167/sq mi (64.3/km^{2})
- Time zone: UTC+1 (CET)
  - Summer (DST): UTC+2 (CEST)

Ripna is a village in the municipality of Tešanj, Bosnia and Herzegovina.

== Demographics ==
According to the 2013 census, its population was 155.

Ethnicity in 2013
Ethnicity	Number	Percentage
Bosniaks	152	98.1%
other/undeclared	3	1.9%
Total	155	100%
