= Logobare =

Village in Tešanj, Bosnia and Herzegovina

- Location within Bosnia and Herzegovina
- Coordinates: 44.6303087°N 17.9879957°E
- Country: Bosnia and Herzegovina
- Entity: Federation of Bosnia and Herzegovina
- Canton: Zenica-Doboj
- Municipality: Tešanj

Area
  - Total: 0.91 sq mi (2.36 km^{2})

Population (2013)
  - Total: 499
  - Density: 548/sq mi (211/km^{2})
- Time zone: UTC+1 (CET)
  - Summer (DST): UTC+2 (CEST)

Logobare is a village in the municipality of Tešanj, Bosnia and Herzegovina.

== Demographics ==
According to the 2013 census, its population was 499.

Ethnicity in 2013
Ethnicity	Number	Percentage
Bosniaks	468	93.8%
Croats	11	2.2%
other/undeclared	20	4.0%
Total	499	100%
