= Tugovići =

Village in Tešanj, Bosnia and Herzegovina

- Location within Bosnia and Herzegovina
- Coordinates: 44.610093°N 18.0079421°E
- Country: Bosnia and Herzegovina
- Entity: Federation of Bosnia and Herzegovina
- Canton: Zenica-Doboj
- Municipality: Tešanj

Area
  - Total: 1.29 sq mi (3.35 km^{2})

Population (2013)
  - Total: 448
  - Density: 346/sq mi (134/km^{2})
- Time zone: UTC+1 (CET)
  - Summer (DST): UTC+2 (CEST)

Tugovići is a village in the municipality of Tešanj, Bosnia and Herzegovina.

== Demographics ==
According to the 2013 census, its population was 448.

Ethnicity in 2013
Ethnicity	Number	Percentage
Bosniaks	431	96.2%
Croats	16	3.6%
Serbs	1	0.2%
Total	448	100%
