= Dobropolje =

Village in Tešanj, Bosnia and Herzegovina

- Location within Bosnia and Herzegovina
- Coordinates: 44.5991914°N 17.9801689°E
- Country: Bosnia and Herzegovina
- Entity: Federation of Bosnia and Herzegovina
- Canton: Zenica-Doboj
- Municipality: Tešanj

Area
  - Total: 0.74 sq mi (1.92 km^{2})

Population (2013)
  - Total: 898
  - Density: 1,210/sq mi (468/km^{2})
- Time zone: UTC+1 (CET)
  - Summer (DST): UTC+2 (CEST)

Dobropolje is a village in the municipality of Tešanj, Bosnia and Herzegovina.

== Demographics ==
According to the 2013 census, its population was 898.

Ethnicity in 2013
| Ethnicity | Number | Percentage |
|---|---|---|
| Bosniaks | 889 | 99.0% |
| Croats | 4 | 0.4% |
| other/undeclared | 5 | 0.6% |
| Total | 898 | 100% |
