= Slavko Lisica =

Major general of the Army of Republika Srpska

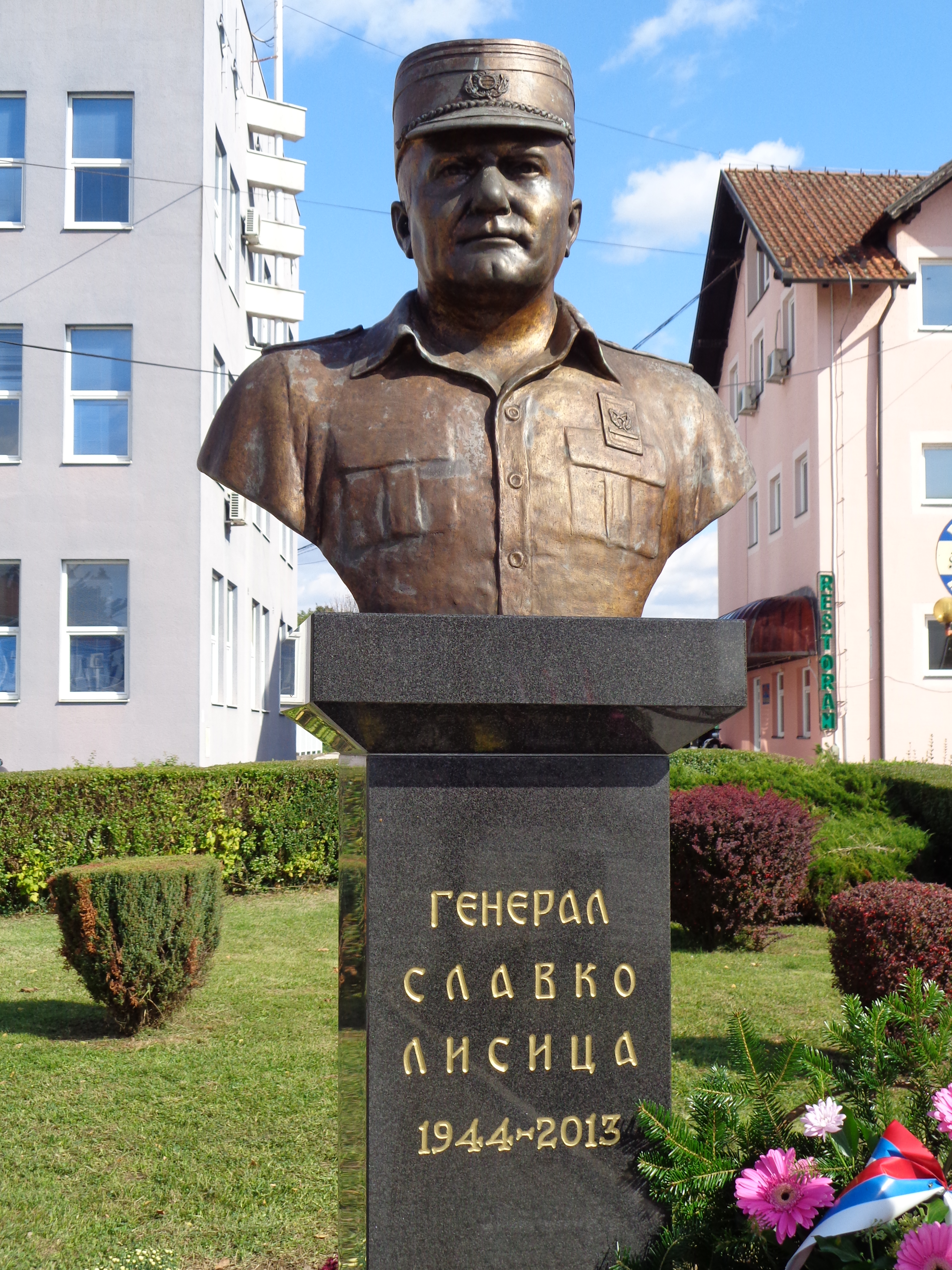
- The monument dedicated to Lisica in Brod
- Born: 18 February 1944; Laminci, Independent state of Croatia (now Laminci, Bosnia and Herzegovina)
- Died: 28 June 2013 (aged 69); Belgrade, Serbia
- Burial place: Saint Pantelija Cemetery, Banja Luka
- Military career
- Allegiance: (Socialist Federal Republic of Yugoslavia) SFR Yugoslavia; Republika Srpska
- Branch: Yugoslav People's Army (until 1992); Army of Republika Srpska (1992–1994)
- Rank: Major general
- Unit: 1st Krajina Corps
- Conflicts: Bosnian War; 1992 Yugoslav campaign in Bosnia; Battle of Kupres; Operation Corridor; Offensive on Teslić (1994); Attack on Teslić; Battle of Žepče; Battles for Gornje Kolibe

Slavko Lisica (Serbian Cyrillic: Славко Лисица; 18 February 1944 – 28 June 2013) was a Major general of the Army of Republika Srpska, a former commander of the Second Armored Brigade of the Army of Republika Srpska and commander of the Doboj Operational Group (OG Doboj).
