= Kalošević =

Village in Tešanj, Bosnia and Herzegovina

- Location within Bosnia and Herzegovina
- Coordinates: 44.6536947°N 17.8857421°E
- Country: Bosnia and Herzegovina
- Entity: Republika Srpska; Federation of Bosnia and Herzegovina
- Region Canton: Sarajevo; Zenica-Doboj
- Municipality: Tešanj; Teslić

Area
  - Total: 2.34 sq mi (6.06 km^{2})

Population (2013)
  - Total: 1,179
  - Density: 504/sq mi (195/km^{2})
- Time zone: UTC+1 (CET)
  - Summer (DST): UTC+2 (CEST)

Kalošević is a village in the municipalities of Teslić (Republika Srpska) and Tešanj, Bosnia and Herzegovina.

== Demographics ==
According to the 2013 census, its population was 1,179, with 1,154 living in the Tešanj part and 25 living in the Teslić part.

Ethnicity in 2013
Ethnicity	Number	Percentage
Bosniaks	1,130	95.8%
Serbs	24	2.0%
Croats	4	0.3%
other/undeclared	21	1.8%
Total	1,179	100%
