= Čaglići =

Village in Tešanj, Bosnia and Herzegovina

- Location within Bosnia and Herzegovina
- Coordinates: 44.5891994°N 18.0069367°E
- Country: Bosnia and Herzegovina
- Entity: Federation of Bosnia and Herzegovina
- Canton: Zenica-Doboj
- Municipality: Tešanj

Area
  - Total: 1.36 sq mi (3.51 km^{2})

Population (2013)
  - Total: 643
  - Density: 474/sq mi (183/km^{2})
- Time zone: UTC+1 (CET)
  - Summer (DST): UTC+2 (CEST)

Čaglići is a village in the municipality of Tešanj, Bosnia and Herzegovina.

== Demographics ==
According to the 2013 census, its population was 643.

Ethnicity in 2013
Ethnicity	Number	Percentage
Bosniaks	629	97.8%
other/undeclared	14	2.2%
Total	643	100%
