= Cerovac, Tešanj =

Village in Tešanj, Bosnia and Herzegovina

Cerovac
- Location within Bosnia and Herzegovina
- Coordinates: 44.6286°N 17.9625°E
- Country: Bosnia and Herzegovina
- Entity: Federation of Bosnia and Herzegovina
- Canton: Zenica-Doboj
- Municipality: Tešanj

Area
  - Total: 1.24 sq mi (3.21 km^{2})

Population (2013)
  - Total: 458
  - Density: 370/sq mi (143/km^{2})
- Time zone: UTC+1 (CET)
  - Summer (DST): UTC+2 (CEST)

Cerovac is a village in the municipality of Tešanj, Bosnia and Herzegovina.

== Demographics ==
According to the 2013 census, its population was 458.

Ethnicity in 2013
Ethnicity	Number	Percentage
Bosniaks	369	80.6%
Croats	71	15.5%
Serbs	6	1.3%
other/undeclared	12	2.6%
Total	458	100%
