= Tešanj Castle =

Medieval fortress in Bosnia and Herzegovina

- Tešanj in Bosnia and Herzegovina
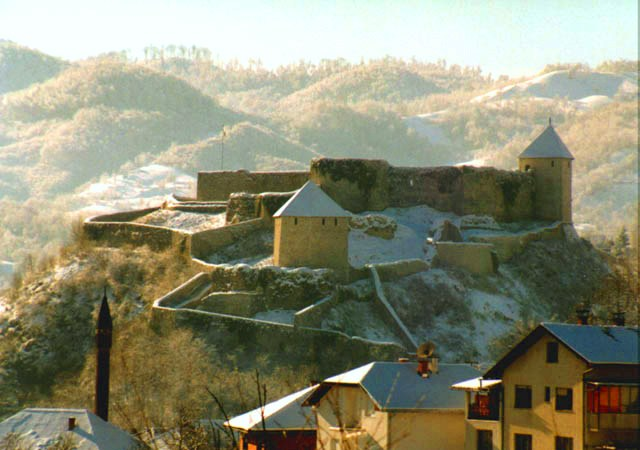
- Tešanj Fortress

Site information
- Type: Castle
- Owner: The Government of Bosnia and Herzegovina
- Controlled by: Regional Museum of Travnik
- Condition: preserved

Location
- Coordinates: 44.61345980441922°N 17.98939625450022°E

Site history
- Built: -th century
- Built by: -
- In use: until 20th c.
- Materials: hewn stone (ashlar)

Garrison information
- Designations

KONS of Bosnia and Herzegovina
- Official name: Old Tešanj castle, the architectural ensemble
- Type: Category 0 cultural and historical property
- Criteria: A, B, C i.iii.iv., D ii.iv., E v., F ii.iii., G v.vii, I iii.iv.
- Designated: 25 January 2005 (?th session)
- Reference no.: -
- Decision no.: -
- State: National Monuments of Bosnia and Herzegovina

Tešanj Fortress (Bosnian, Croatian and Serbian: Tešanjska tvrđava / Тешањска тврђава), also known locally as Gradina is a fortress located in Tešanj, Bosnia and Herzegovina. It remains one of the biggest historical defensive fortifications in the country with an area of 6,296 square metres (67,770 ft^{2}).

== Location ==
The fortress is located on a steep cliff around which Tešanj city centre eventually was formed. It is accessible only from one side which had provided it with a good defensive advantage against any incoming forces.

== History ==
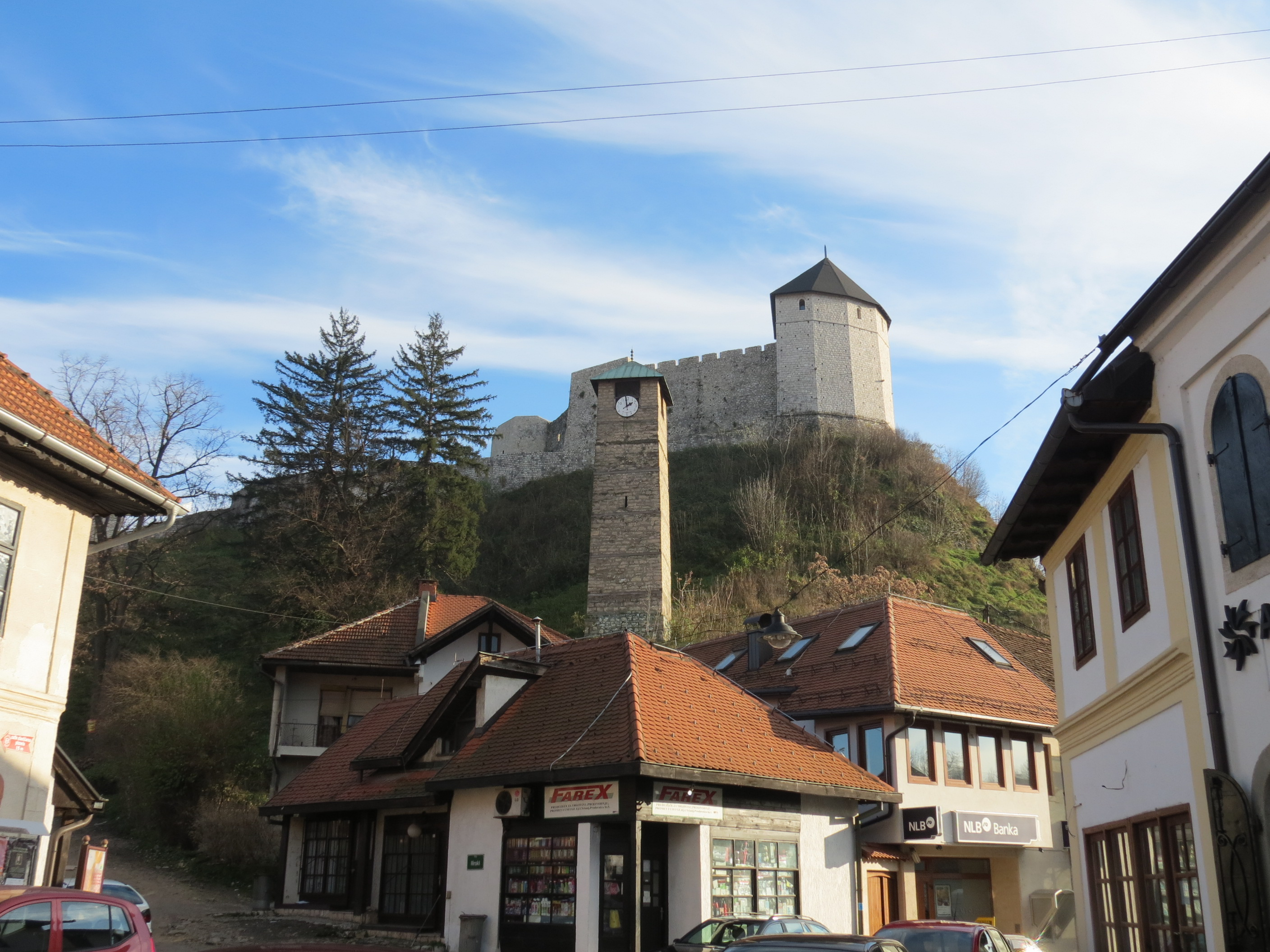
Castle as seen from the heart of Old town of Tešanj

No current historical sources identify the exact year of its construction or who its constructor was. The early foundation of this fortification had started some time during the Bronze Age and it was later gradually expanded by the Romans, Slavs and Ottomans. It has been primarily a defensive fortification and during the Ottoman period, the fortress had a permanent Ottoman Army garrison. In 1697, during Prince Eugene of Savoy's raid, it had been besieged for 3 days but remained unconquered.

== See also ==
- Tešanj
