= Čifluk, Tešanj =

Village in Tešanj, Bosnia and Herzegovina

Čifluk
- Location within Bosnia and Herzegovina
- Coordinates: 44.6286974°N 18.0014053°E
- Country: Bosnia and Herzegovina
- Entity: Federation of Bosnia and Herzegovina
- Canton: Zenica-Doboj
- Municipality: Tešanj

Area
  - Total: 0.83 sq mi (2.14 km^{2})

Population (2013)
  - Total: 576
  - Density: 697/sq mi (269/km^{2})
- Time zone: UTC+1 (CET)
  - Summer (DST): UTC+2 (CEST)

Čifluk is a village in the municipality of Tešanj, Bosnia and Herzegovina.

== Demographics ==
According to the 2013 census, its population was 576.

Ethnicity in 2013
Ethnicity	Number	Percentage
Bosniaks	540	93.8%
Croats	30	5.2%
Serbs	1	0.2%
other/undeclared	5	0.9%
Total	576	100%
