= Drinčići =

Village in Tešanj, Bosnia and Herzegovina

- Location within Bosnia and Herzegovina
- Coordinates: 44.6691725°N 17.9182937°E
- Country: Bosnia and Herzegovina
- Entity: Federation of Bosnia and Herzegovina
- Canton: Zenica-Doboj
- Municipality: Tešanj

Area
  - Total: 0.60 sq mi (1.55 km^{2})

Population (2013)
  - Total: 291
  - Density: 486/sq mi (188/km^{2})
- Time zone: UTC+1 (CET)
  - Summer (DST): UTC+2 (CEST)

Drinčići is a village in the municipality of Tešanj, Bosnia and Herzegovina.

== Demographics ==
According to the 2013 census, its population was 291.

Ethnicity in 2013
Ethnicity	Number	Percentage
Bosniaks	278	95.5%
Croats	11	3.8%
Serbs	1	0.3%
other/undeclared	1	0.3%
Total	962	100%
