= Lepenica, Tešanj =

Village in Tešanj, Bosnia and Herzegovina

Lepenica
- Location within Bosnia and Herzegovina
- Coordinates: 44.6687566°N 18.0337987°E
- Country: Bosnia and Herzegovina
- Entity: Federation of Bosnia and Herzegovina
- Canton: Zenica-Doboj
- Municipality: Tešanj

Area
  - Total: 1.81 sq mi (4.68 km^{2})

Population (2013)
  - Total: 1,514
  - Density: 838/sq mi (324/km^{2})
- Time zone: UTC+1 (CET)
  - Summer (DST): UTC+2 (CEST)

Lepenica is a village in the municipality of Tešanj, Bosnia and Herzegovina.

== Demographics ==
According to the 2013 census, its population was 1,514.

Ethnicity in 2013
Ethnicity	Number	Percentage
Bosniaks	1,501	99.1%
Croats	3	0.2%
other/undeclared	10	0.7%
Total	1,514	100%
