= Medakovo =

Village in Tešanj, Bosnia and Herzegovina

- Location within Bosnia and Herzegovina
- Coordinates: 44.6428965°N 18.0168374°E
- Country: Bosnia and Herzegovina
- Entity: Federation of Bosnia and Herzegovina
- Canton: Zenica-Doboj
- Municipality: Tešanj

Area
  - Total: 1.88 sq mi (4.86 km^{2})

Population (2013)
  - Total: 813
  - Density: 433/sq mi (167/km^{2})
- Time zone: UTC+1 (CET)
  - Summer (DST): UTC+2 (CEST)

Medakovo is a village in the municipality of Tešanj, Bosnia and Herzegovina.

== Demographics ==
According to the 2013 census, its population was 813.

Ethnicity in 2013
Ethnicity	Number	Percentage
Bosniaks	796	97.9%
Serbs	6	0.7%
other/undeclared	11	1.4%
Total	813	100%
