= Jelah Polje =

Village in Tešanj, Bosnia and Herzegovina

- Location within Bosnia and Herzegovina
- Coordinates: 44.6686819°N 17.9373189°E
- Country: Bosnia and Herzegovina
- Entity: Federation of Bosnia and Herzegovina
- Canton: Zenica-Doboj
- Municipality: Tešanj

Area
  - Total: 0.85 sq mi (2.21 km^{2})

Population (2013)
  - Total: 353
  - Density: 414/sq mi (160/km^{2})
- Time zone: UTC+1 (CET)
  - Summer (DST): UTC+2 (CEST)

Jelah Polje is a village in the municipality of Tešanj, Bosnia and Herzegovina.

== Demographics ==
According to the 2013 census, its population was 353.

Ethnicity in 2013
Ethnicity	Number	Percentage
Bosniaks	325	92.1%
Croats	8	2.3%
other/undeclared	20	5.7%
Total	353	100%
