= Žarkovina =

Village in Bosnia and Herzegovina

Coordinates: 44°37′58″N 17°51′25″E

Žarkovina (Serbian Cyrillic: Жарковина) is a village near Teslić, in Republic of Srpska, Bosnia and Herzegovina.

It is located abt 4 km to the north from Teslić, on the left side of the Usora river. According to the 1991 census its population (including Vrela, then part of Žarkovina) was 486.

Name	total	Serbs	Muslims	Croats	Yugoslavs	others
Žarkovina	486	441	0	7	20	18

The village is located on the left side of the Usora river, but the name Žarkovina refers to the area of approximate size on the opposite, right side of the river. The left side is the settlement (homes and yards) and the right side is industrial zone now. The right side is sometimes referred as Žarkovačka polja (Serbian Cyrillic: Жарковачка поља, literally: Žarkovina fields).

The industrial zone area was previously private agricultural fields, but today there are several factories built, as well as one shopping mall.

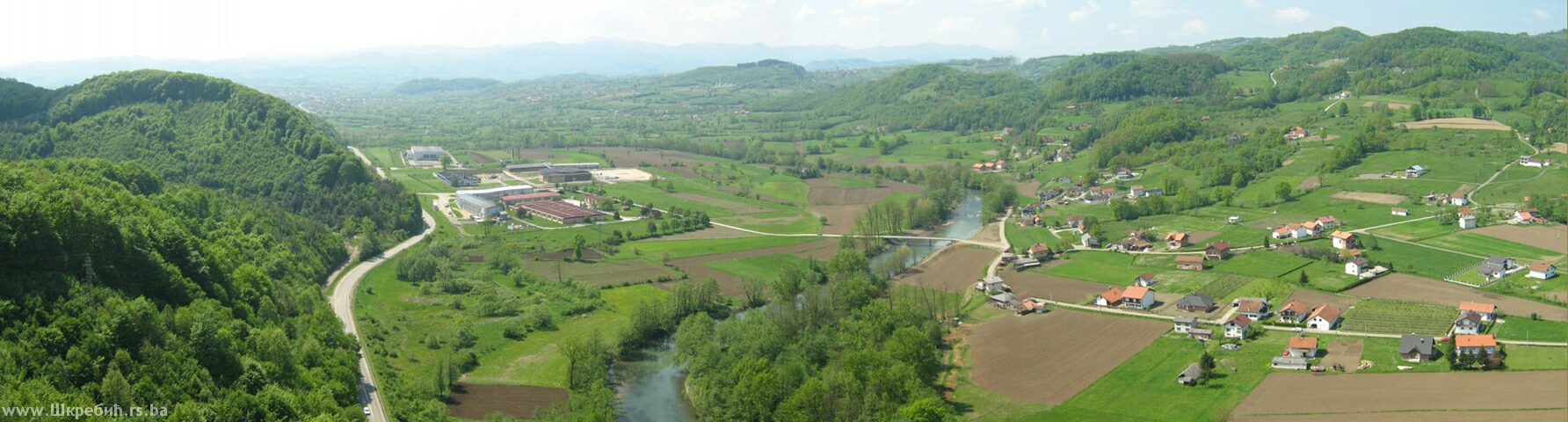
Žarkovina
