= Novo Selo, Tešanj =

Village in Tešanj, Bosnia and Herzegovina

Novo Selo
- Location within Bosnia and Herzegovina
- Coordinates: 44.6439614°N 17.9924449°E
- Country: Bosnia and Herzegovina
- Entity: Federation of Bosnia and Herzegovina
- Canton: Zenica-Doboj
- Municipality: Tešanj

Area
  - Total: 0.95 sq mi (2.45 km^{2})

Population (2013)
  - Total: 863
  - Density: 912/sq mi (352/km^{2})
- Time zone: UTC+1 (CET)
  - Summer (DST): UTC+2 (CEST)

Novo Selo is a village in the municipality of Tešanj, Bosnia and Herzegovina. The etymology of the village's name comes from Slavic languages meaning new village, Novo Selo.

== Demographics ==
According to the 2013 census, its population was 863.

Ethnicity in 2013
Ethnicity	Number	Percentage
Bosniaks	790	91.5%
Croats	54	6.3%
Serbs	1	0.1%
other/undeclared	18	2.1%
Total	863	100%
