= Battle of Žepče =

1993 battle of the Bosnian War

- Part of Croat-Bosniak war
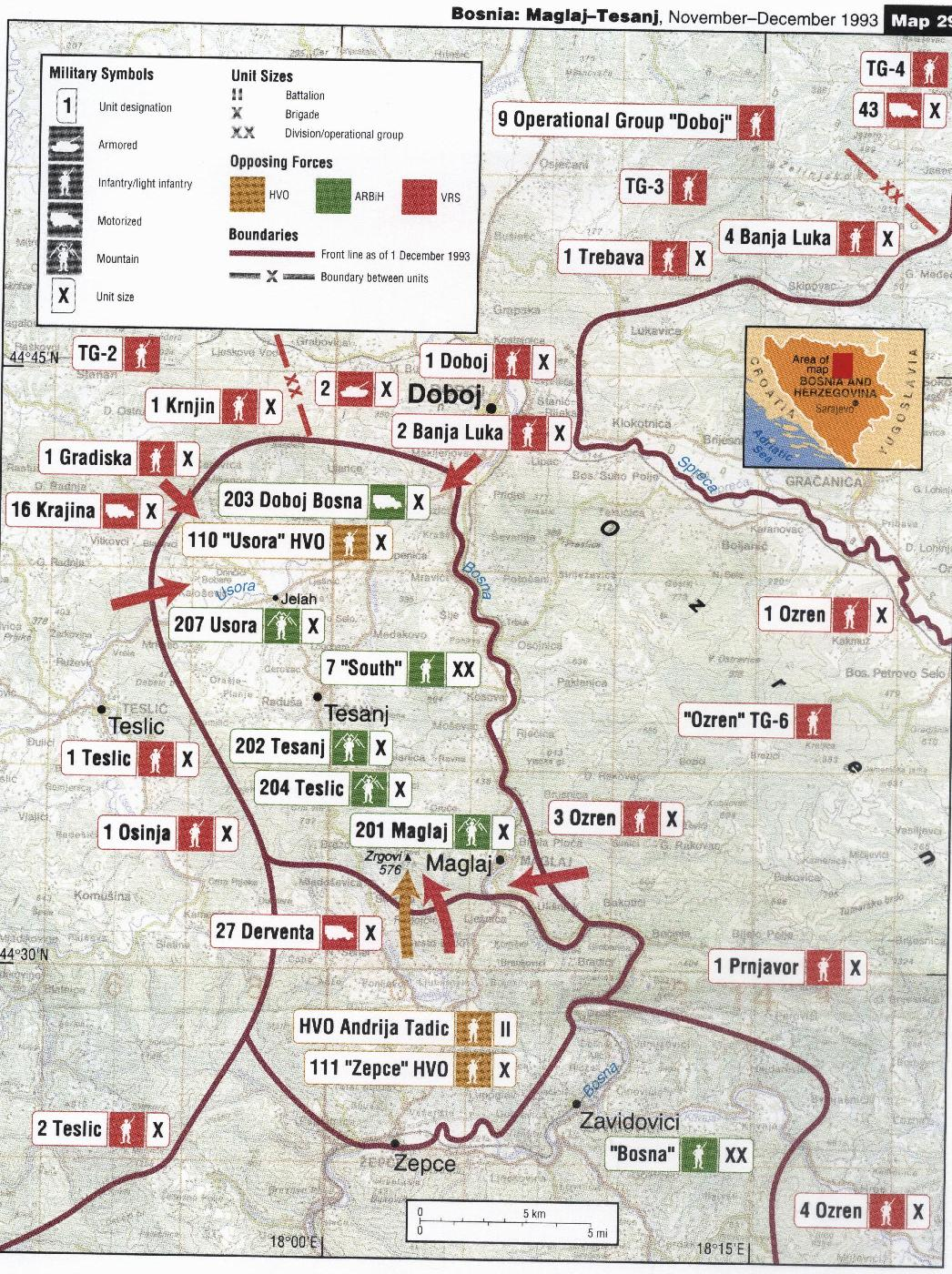
- Battle map
Date	24–30 June 1993
Location	Žepče, Bosnia and Herzegovina
Result	HVO–VRS victory: ARBiH 305th and 319th Brigades are disbanded
Territorial changes	Žepče is successfully defended by Serbian forces; Tešanj–Maglaj pocket remained in Croatian hands until Washington agreement

Belligerents
Croatian Republic of Herzeg-Bosnia; Republika Srpska	Republic of Bosnia and Herzegovina

Commanders and leaders
Ivo Lozančić (Republika Srpska) Slavko Lisica	(Republic of Bosnia and Herzegovina) Galib Dervišević (surrendered) (POW); Refik Lendo

Units involved
Croatian Defence Council; 3rd Operational Group; 110th Žepče Brigade; 111th Žepče Brigade; HVO Military Police; Army of Republika Srpska; (Republika Srpska) Doboj Operational Group	ARBiH; 305th Brigade (surrendered); 319th Brigade (surrendered); 318th brigade; 304th brigade; 314th brigade; 303th brigade; 7. Muslim motorized brigade; Green Berets; Bosnian mujahideen

Strength
: 2,000 (Republika Srpska) : At least 7 tanks	: 12,500 soldiers : Unknown

Casualties and losses
52 killed (Republika Srpska) Unknown	(Republic of Bosnia and Herzegovina) 120 killed (Republic of Bosnia and Herzegovina) 5,000 captured (Republic of Bosnia and Herzegovina) Many Bosniaks executed
- (Republic of Bosnia and Herzegovina) 9,000 displaced (Republic of Bosnia and Herzegovina) 427 are deported to Žepče camp (Republic of Bosnia and Herzegovina) 160 are killed in camps

The Battle of Žepče (Bosnian and Croatian: Bitka za Žepče) took place between the Army of the Republic of Bosnia and Herzegovina (ARBiH), Croatian Defence Council (HVO) and the Army of Republika Srpska (VRS) in Žepče, Bosnia and Herzegovina from 24 to 30 June 1993. It was also one of the cases where Serbian and Croatian forces had cooperation between each other against the Bosniak forces.

== Prelude ==
War broke out between Herzeg-Bosnia, supported by Croatia, and the Republic of Bosnia and Herzegovina, supported by the Bosnian Mujahideen and the Croatian Defence Forces. It lasted from 18 October 1992 to 23 February 1994, and is considered often as a "war within a war" as it was a part of the much larger Bosnian War. Fighting soon spread to Central Bosnia and soon Herzegovina, where most of the fighting would take place in those regions.

== Battle ==
The 319th Mountain Brigade which was located in the city found itself surrounded while other brigade of ARBiH took over high ground around city. The Bosnian Serb "Doboj" group proved to be decisive in the battle and managed to overrun Bosnian forces. After six days of fighting for Žepče, on 30 June Galib Dervišević agreed to surrender the 305th and 319th Brigade after which the brigades abolished. By Croat sources, captured Bosniak soldiers numbered to around 5,000.
