= Putešić =

Village in Tešanj, Bosnia and Herzegovina

- Location within Bosnia and Herzegovina
- Coordinates: 44.6389781°N 17.8906084°E
- Country: Bosnia and Herzegovina
- Entity: Federation of Bosnia and Herzegovina
- Canton: Zenica-Doboj
- Municipality: Tešanj

Area
  - Total: 0.82 sq mi (2.13 km^{2})

Population (2013)
  - Total: 476
  - Density: 579/sq mi (223/km^{2})
- Time zone: UTC+1 (CET)
  - Summer (DST): UTC+2 (CEST)

Putešić is a village in the municipality of Tešanj, Bosnia and Herzegovina.

== Demographics ==
According to the 2013 census, its population was 476.

Ethnicity in 2013
Ethnicity	Number	Percentage
Bosniaks	455	95.6%
Serbs	5	1.1%
Croats	4	0.8%
other/undeclared	12	2.5%
Total	476	100%
