= Ljetinić =

Village in Tešanj, Bosnia and Herzegovina

- Location within Bosnia and Herzegovina
- Coordinates: 44.6573256°N 17.9828623°E
- Country: Bosnia and Herzegovina
- Entity: Federation of Bosnia and Herzegovina
- Canton: Zenica-Doboj
- Municipality: Tešanj

Area
  - Total: 0.81 sq mi (2.10 km^{2})

Population (2013)
  - Total: 849
  - Density: 1,050/sq mi (404/km^{2})
- Time zone: UTC+1 (CET)
  - Summer (DST): UTC+2 (CEST)

Ljetinić is a village in the municipality of Tešanj, Bosnia and Herzegovina.

== Demographics ==
According to the 2013 census, its population was 849.

Ethnicity in 2013
Ethnicity	Number	Percentage
Bosniaks	821	96.7%
Croats	6	0.7%
Serbs	1	0.1%
other/undeclared	21	2.5%
Total	849	100%
