= Jablanica, Tešanj =

Village in Tešanj, Bosnia and Herzegovina

Jablanica
- Location within Bosnia and Herzegovina
- Coordinates: 44.5931812°N 18.019322°E
- Country: Bosnia and Herzegovina
- Entity: Federation of Bosnia and Herzegovina
- Canton: Zenica-Doboj
- Municipality: Tešanj

Area
  - Total: 1.43 sq mi (3.70 km^{2})

Population (2013)
  - Total: 752
  - Density: 526/sq mi (203/km^{2})
- Time zone: UTC+1 (CET)
  - Summer (DST): UTC+2 (CEST)

Jablanica is a village in the municipality of Tešanj, Bosnia and Herzegovina.

== Demographics ==
According to the 2013 census, its population was 752, all Bosniaks.
