= Jezera, Zenica =

Jezera Језера
- Village
- Interactive map of Jezera
- Location within Bosnia and Herzegovina
- Country: Bosnia and Herzegovina
- Entity: Republika Srpska; Federation of Bosnia and Herzegovina
- Region Canton: Sarajevo; Zenica-Doboj
- Municipality: Teslić; Zenica

Area
  - Total: 16.22 sq mi (42.01 km^{2})

Population (2013)
  - Total: 0
  - Density: 0.0/sq mi (0.0/km^{2})
- Time zone: UTC+1 (CET)
  - Summer (DST): UTC+2 (CEST)

Jezera (Serbian Cyrillic: Језера) is a village in central Bosnia and Herzegovina. Before the collapse and dissolution of Yugoslavia and the War in Bosnia and Herzegovina, 1992-1995, Jezera was administratively under the jurisdiction of Teslić, a municipality in central-northern Bosnia; after the war the village was administratively partly attached to the municipality of Zenica, to the south of Teslić.

== Demographics ==
The ethnic and religious structure of Jezera was disturbed by the war in Bosnia and Herzegovina. Heavily populated by the Orthodox Christian inhabitants before the war, Jezera's demographic structure drastically changed during and following the war. To give an example, virtually the entire subvillage (Serbo-Croatian: zaseok, pl. zaseoci) Kusići, left their homes and the area. Among the reasons for this exodus was the newly established geopolitical order in Bosnia and Herzegovina, and the administrative attachment of the village to Zenica. The border between the two Bosnian "entities," i.e. the Federation of Bosnia and Herzegovina and Republika Srpska, runs through the village Jezera.

Before the war and the exodus of its population, the village of Jezera was composed of several subvillages:

- Đukići
- Đurići
- Jelići
- Kusići
- Mijići
- Nedići
- Panići

As is often the case with many other Bosnian toponyms, the names of villages and subvillages are the same as the last names carried by its inhabitants; e.g., the villagers of the subvillage Đukići (pl. of Đukić) would carry the same last name, Đukić.

=== Ethnic composition, 1991. census ===
total: 1,069

- Serbs - 1,063 (99.43%)
- Croats - 1 (0.09%)
- others and unknown - 5 (0.46%)

=== References ===
- Official results from the book: Ethnic composition of Bosnia-Herzegovina population, by municipalities and settlements, 1991. census, Zavod za statistiku Bosne i Hercegovine - Bilten no. 234, Sarajevo, 1991.

== See also ==
- Teslić, Bosnia and Herzergovina.
