= Karadaglije =

Village in Tešanj, Bosnia and Herzegovina

- Location within Bosnia and Herzegovina
- Coordinates: 44.5706119°N 18.0088486°E
- Country: Bosnia and Herzegovina
- Entity: Federation of Bosnia and Herzegovina
- Canton: Zenica-Doboj
- Municipality: Tešanj

Area
  - Total: 3.88 sq mi (10.05 km^{2})

Population (2013)
  - Total: 752
  - Density: 194/sq mi (74.8/km^{2})
- Time zone: UTC+1 (CET)
  - Summer (DST): UTC+2 (CEST)

Karadaglije is a village in the municipality of Tešanj, Bosnia and Herzegovina.

== Demographics ==
According to the 2013 census, its population was 752.

Ethnicity in 2013
Ethnicity	Number	Percentage
Bosniaks	735	97.7%
Serbs	7	0.9%
Croats	1	0.1%
other/undeclared	9	1.2%
Total	752	100%
