= Vukovo, Tešanj =

Village in Tešanj, Bosnia and Herzegovina

Vukovo
- Location within Bosnia and Herzegovina
- Coordinates: 44.6448045°N 17.9657573°E
- Country: Bosnia and Herzegovina
- Entity: Federation of Bosnia and Herzegovina
- Canton: Zenica-Doboj
- Municipality: Tešanj

Area
  - Total: 0.93 sq mi (2.42 km^{2})

Population (2013)
  - Total: 1,057
  - Density: 1,130/sq mi (437/km^{2})
- Time zone: UTC+1 (CET)
  - Summer (DST): UTC+2 (CEST)

Vukovo is a village in the municipality of Tešanj, Bosnia and Herzegovina.

== Demographics ==
According to the 2013 census, its population was 1,057.

Ethnicity in 2013
Ethnicity	Number	Percentage
Bosniaks	1,018	96.3%
Croats	13	1.2%
Serbs	13	1.2%
other/undeclared	13	1.2%
Total	1,057	100%
