= Vrela, Teslić =

Village in Tešanj, Bosnia and Herzegovina

Vrela
- Interactive map of Vrela
- Location within Bosnia and Herzegovina
- Coordinates: 44.636871°N 17.8661512°E
- Country: Bosnia and Herzegovina
- Entity: Republika Srpska; Federation of Bosnia and Herzegovina
- Region Canton: Sarajevo; Zenica-Doboj
- Municipality: Tešanj; Teslić

Area
  - Total: 6.32 km^{2} (2.44 sq mi)

Population (2013)
  - Total: 94
  - Density: 15/km^{2} (39/sq mi)
- Time zone: UTC+1 (CET)
  - Summer (DST): UTC+2 (CEST)

Vrela (Cyrillic: Врела) is a village in the municipalities of Teslić (Republika Srpska) and Tešanj, Bosnia and Herzegovina.

== Geography ==
It is bordered by the river Usora to the north and hills to the south, the Škrebin Kamen hill (literally: Škreba's Rock) to the west and the Kalošević village to the east. It is the first settlement of the Teslić municipality encountered when approaching from Doboj.

== History ==
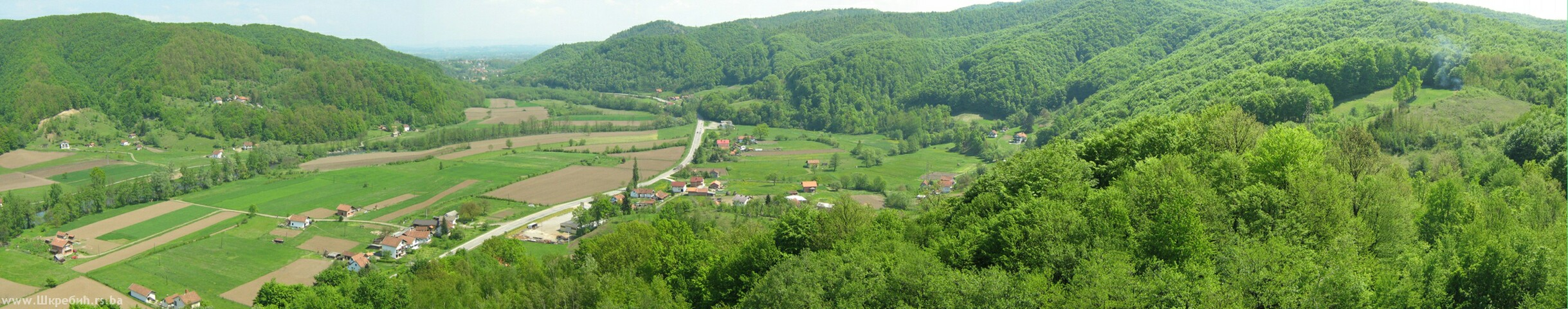
Panorama of Vrela

Today, Verla is an individual local community within the municipality. Previously, it was an insignificant part of neighbouring local communities such as Žarkovina and Stenjak within Teslić municipality, or Kalošević within Tešanj municipality. Until 1968 it had a railway station.

During the war in Bosnia, the village was an important border crossing between the then warring Republic of Srpska and Federation of Bosnia and Herzegovina, where numerous exchanges of POWs, civilians, and casualties were conducted. The area around the Inter-Entity Boundary Line was heavily seeded with land mines and some parts are still considered dangerous.

== Demographics ==
According to the 2013 census, its population was 94, with 32 living in the Tešanj part and 62 living in the Teslić part.

Ethnicity in 2013
Ethnicity	Number	Percentage
Serbs	71	75.5%
Croats	23	24.5%
Total	94	100%
