= Slaviša Gačić =

Bosnian Serb footballer

Personal information
- Full name: Slaviša Gačić
- Date of birth: December 20, 1986 (age 39)
- Place of birth: Teslić, SFR Yugoslavia
- Height: 1.84 m (6 ft 1/2 in)
- Position: Central defender

Team information
- Current team: Proleter Teslić
- Number: 15

Youth career
- 1996–2001: Proleter Teslić

Senior career*
Years	Team	Apps	(Gls)
2001–2011	Proleter Teslić	160	(5)
2012–2013	FK Budućnost Banja Luka	16	(2)
2013–2014	FK Džaja Banja Luka	22	(8)
2014–2016	FK Sloga Trn	52	(6)
2016–2018	FK 13 Skojevki	30	(7)
2018–2023	FK Laminci Gradiska	103	(12)
2023–2024	FK Borac Maglajani	41	(5)
2024–	FK Laminci Gradiska	61	(7)
- * Club domestic league appearances and goals

Slaviša Gačić (born 20 December 1986 in Teslić, SR Bosnia and Herzegovina) is a Bosnian Serb professional football defender who played for FK Proleter Teslić in the First League of the Republika Srpska.

== Career ==
- Proleter Teslić 2001–2011
- FK Budućnost Banja Luka 2012–2013
- FK Džaja Banja Luka 2013–2014
- FK Sloga Trn 2014–2016
- FK 13 Skojevki 2016–2018
- FK Laminci Gradiska 2018–2023
- FK Borac Maglajani 2023–2024
- FK Laminci Gradiska 2024-
