= Solila, Borja =

Coordinates: 44°35′10″N 17°35′36″E

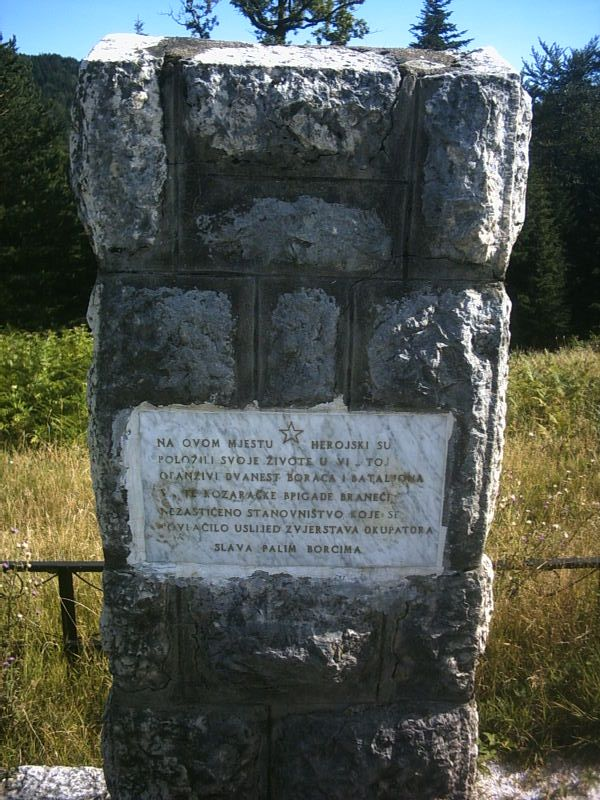
World War II partisan monument on Solila

Solila is a relatively small forest-free area on top of The Borja mountain near Teslić, in Republic of Srpska, Bosnia and Herzegovina.

Its altitude is about 870 m. It is located on the old route of the regional road Teslić-Banja Luka. During the World War II a group of partisans was killed on this spot and a monument was erected in the post-war Yugoslavia. During the communist era in Yugoslavia it was popular place for picnics and visits.

The text on the monument is in Bosnian (Latin script) and roughly translates as:

On this spot a dozen of fighters of the 1st battalion of the 5th Kozara Brigade gave their lives heroically defending unprotected civilians who were withdrawing pushed by the bestialities of the occupation forces. Glory to these fallen soldiers.

Solila offers a wonderful view to the Borja mountain and forests of Bosnia. There is a pleasant motel abt 2 km to the North.
