= Bobare, Bosnia and Herzegovina =

Village in Tešanj, Bosnia and Herzegovina

Bobare
- Location within Bosnia and Herzegovina
- Coordinates: 44.6635553°N 17.9080375°E
- Country: Bosnia and Herzegovina
- Entity: Federation of Bosnia and Herzegovina
- Canton: Zenica-Doboj
- Municipality: Tešanj

Area
  - Total: 1.18 sq mi (3.06 km^{2})

Population (2013)
  - Total: 563
  - Density: 477/sq mi (184/km^{2})
- Time zone: UTC+1 (CET)
  - Summer (DST): UTC+2 (CEST)

Bobare is a village in the municipality of Tešanj, Bosnia and Herzegovina.

== Demographics ==
According to the 2013 census, its population was 563.

Ethnicity in 2013
| Ethnicity | Number | Percentage |
|---|---|---|
| Bosniaks | 531 | 94.3% |
| Croats | 26 | 4.6% |
| Serbs | 0 | 0.0% |
| other/undeclared | 6 | 1.1% |
| Total | 563 | 100% |
