= Raduša, Tešanj =

Village in Tešanj, Bosnia and Herzegovina

Raduša
- Location within Bosnia and Herzegovina
- Coordinates: 44.6082699°N 17.9500126°E
- Country: Bosnia and Herzegovina
- Entity: Federation of Bosnia and Herzegovina
- Canton: Zenica-Doboj
- Municipality: Tešanj

Area
  - Total: 6.95 sq mi (18.00 km^{2})

Population (2013)
  - Total: 3,051
  - Density: 439.0/sq mi (169.5/km^{2})
- Time zone: UTC+1 (CET)
  - Summer (DST): UTC+2 (CEST)

Raduša is a village in the municipality of Tešanj, Bosnia and Herzegovina.

== Demographics ==
According to the 2013 census, its population was 3,051.

Ethnicity in 2013
Ethnicity	Number	Percentage
Bosniaks	2,932	96.1%
Croats	31	1.0%
Serbs	28	0.9%
other/undeclared	60	2.0%
Total	3,051	100%
