= Rosulje, Tešanj =

Village in Tešanj, Bosnia and Herzegovina

Rosulje
- Location within Bosnia and Herzegovina
- Coordinates: 44.6568827°N 17.9633329°E
- Country: Bosnia and Herzegovina
- Entity: Federation of Bosnia and Herzegovina
- Canton: Zenica-Doboj
- Municipality: Tešanj

Area
  - Total: 1.42 sq mi (3.68 km^{2})

Population (2013)
  - Total: 893
  - Density: 628/sq mi (243/km^{2})
- Time zone: UTC+1 (CET)
  - Summer (DST): UTC+2 (CEST)

Rosulje is a village in the municipality of Tešanj, Bosnia and Herzegovina.

== Demographics ==
According to the 2013 census, its population was 893.

Ethnicity in 2013
Ethnicity	Number	Percentage
Bosniaks	699	78.3%
Croats	126	14.1%
Serbs	51	5.7%
other/undeclared	17	1.9%
Total	893	100%
