= Vrela, Visoko =

Vrela
- Village
- Location within Bosnia and Herzegovina
- Coordinates: 43.9821959°N 18.1915022°E
- Country: Bosnia and Herzegovina
- Entity: Federation of Bosnia and Herzegovina
- Canton: Zenica-Doboj
- Municipality: Visoko

Area
  - Total: 0.58 sq mi (1.50 km^{2})

Population (2013)
  - Total: 167
  - Density: 288/sq mi (111/km^{2})
- Time zone: UTC+1 (CET)
  - Summer (DST): UTC+2 (CEST)

Vrela is a village in the municipality of Visoko, Bosnia and Herzegovina.

== Demographics ==
According to the 2013 census, its population was 167.

Ethnicity in 2013
Ethnicity	Number	Percentage
Bosniaks	155	92.8%
Serbs	5	3.0%
other/undeclared	7	4.2%
Total	167	100%
