= Stećak's of Vojvoda Momčilo =

Medieval stećak tombstones in Bosnia and Herzegovina

Coordinates: 44.579°N 17.898°E

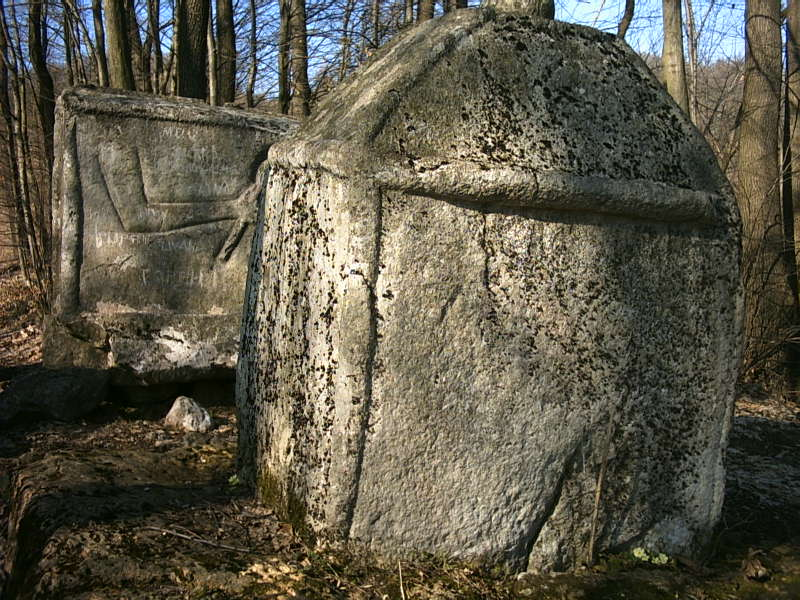
Duke Momčilo's tombstones

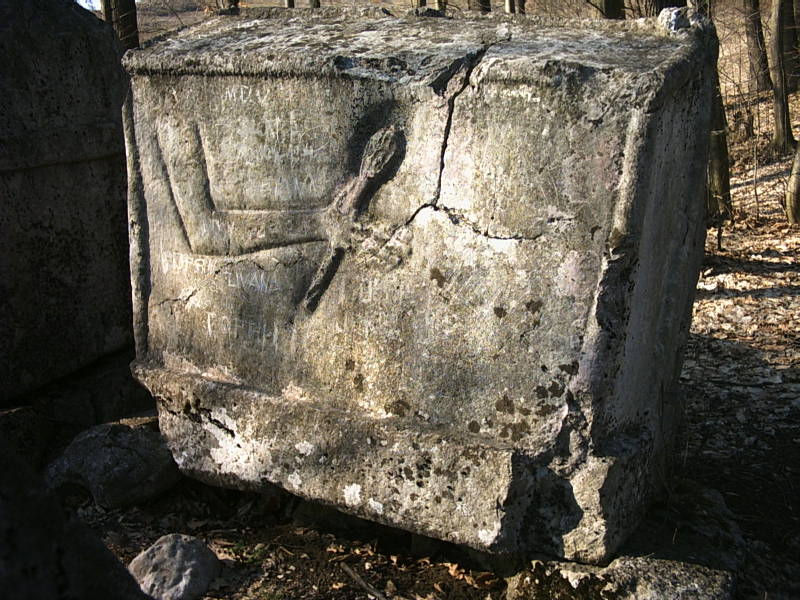
The main tombstone of the group

Stećak's of Vojvoda Momčilo or the Stećak tombstones of Duke Momčilo are a group of three medieval stećaks near Teslić in Bosnia and Herzegovina.

The exact location of the tombstones is in Brkića Potok, a hamlet of Vrućica. They are situated on the south-western sides of Stražbenica hill.

The locals named the tombstones as Vojvoda Momčilo's stećci (Duke Momčilo's stećaks) and they believe that they are tombstones of the duke, his wife, and their child. However, no historical or archeological research confirmed that there ever was any Duke reigning the area, nor was there any other ruler named Momčilo.

The tombstones are not under care of any official authority. No research concluded their age or origin.

== Sources ==
- Petar Bogunović: Iz usorskog kraja i okoline
- Boško Petrović: Vojvoda Momčilo
