= Tešanj =

Town and municipality in Bosnia and Herzegovina

Tešanj Тешањ
- Town and municipality
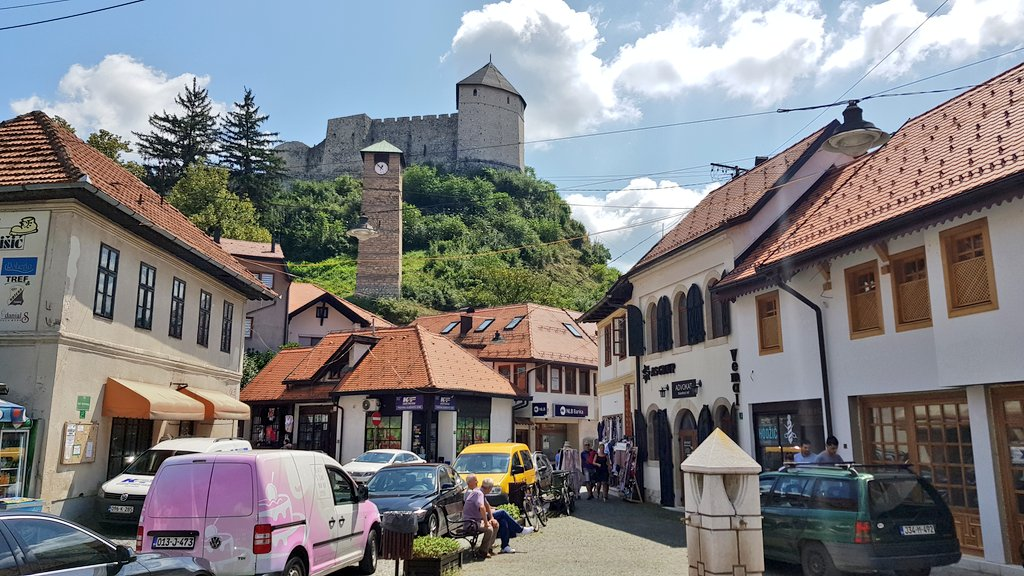

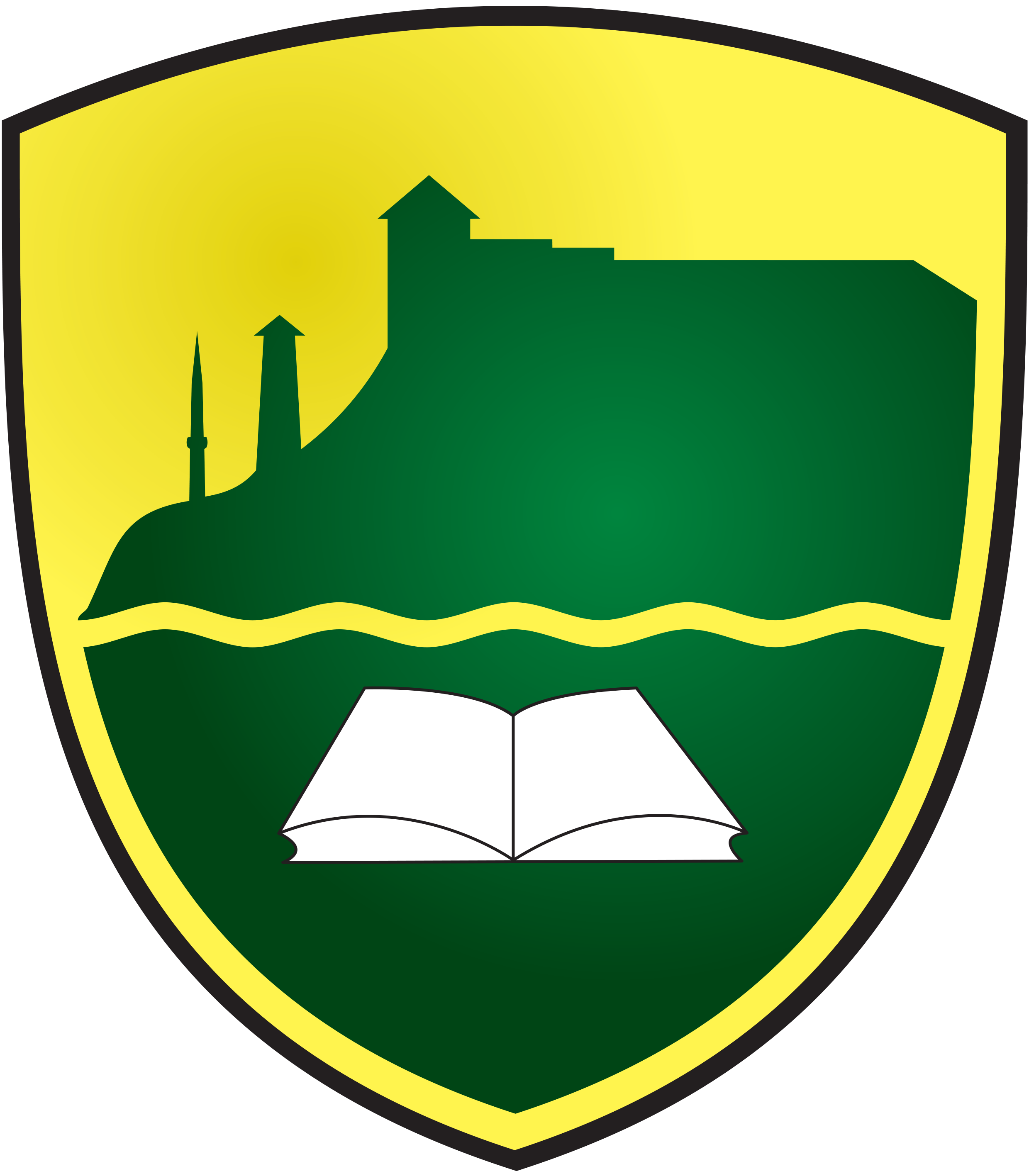
- Coat of arms

- Location of Tešanj within Bosnia and Herzegovina.
- Coordinates: 44°36′51″N 17°59′22″E
- Country: Bosnia and Herzegovina
- Entity: Federation of Bosnia and Herzegovina
- Canton: Zenica-Doboj

Government
  - Municipal mayor: Suad Huskić (SDA)

Area
  - Town and municipality: 1,559 km^{2} (602 sq mi)

Population (2013 census)
  - Town and municipality: 43,063
  - Density: 276.22/km^{2} (715.4/sq mi)
  - Urban: 5,257
- Time zone: UTC+1 (CET)
  - Summer (DST): UTC+2 (CEST)
- Area code: +387 32
- Website: www.opcina-tesanj.ba

Tešanj (Cyrillic: Тешањ) is a town and municipality located in the Zenica-Doboj Canton of the Federation of Bosnia and Herzegovina, an entity of Bosnia and Herzegovina. As of 2013, the municipality has a population of 43,063 inhabitants, while the town of Tešanj has a population of 5,257 inhabitants. It is situated in the northern part of Bosnia and Herzegovina.

== Geography ==
Tešanj is located at an altitude of 230 meters and was built around the river Tešanjka. The town is surrounded by many hills.

== History ==
The present name of the city was mentioned for the first time in 1461 in a charter from King Stephen Tomašević to his uncle Radivoj. The charter stated that King Stephen Tomašević grants him, among other possessions "i na Usori grad Tešanj -- the city of Tešanj, in the Usora region".

Between the second half of the 15th and the first half of the 16th century, the history of Tešanj was rather chaotic. Since Bosnia was a buffer state between the Ottomans and the Hungarians, parts of it changed rulers quite often, alternating between Ottoman and Hungarian occupation. Between 1463 and 1476 Tešanj was the center of the Bosnian Kingdom and the residence of Duke Radivoj Kotromanić.

From 1512 (or 1520-21) onwards, Tešanj was under the continuous rule of the Ottoman Empire. The most influential Ottoman ruler of Tešanj was the Bosnian Sandžak-bey Gazi Ferhad Pasha. It was under his authority that the city rapidly developed. His most significant contribution was the Ferhadija Mosque (1563), which still stands in the old town, dating back to the 16th century. Gazi Ferhad-bey died in 1568 and was buried in the yard of the mosque. The epitaph on his tombstone was in Arabic, and is the oldest Islamic record in Tešanj.

The old Eminagić House is the oldest house in Tešanj, still standing the test of time, and is said to have been built at the end of the 17th century.

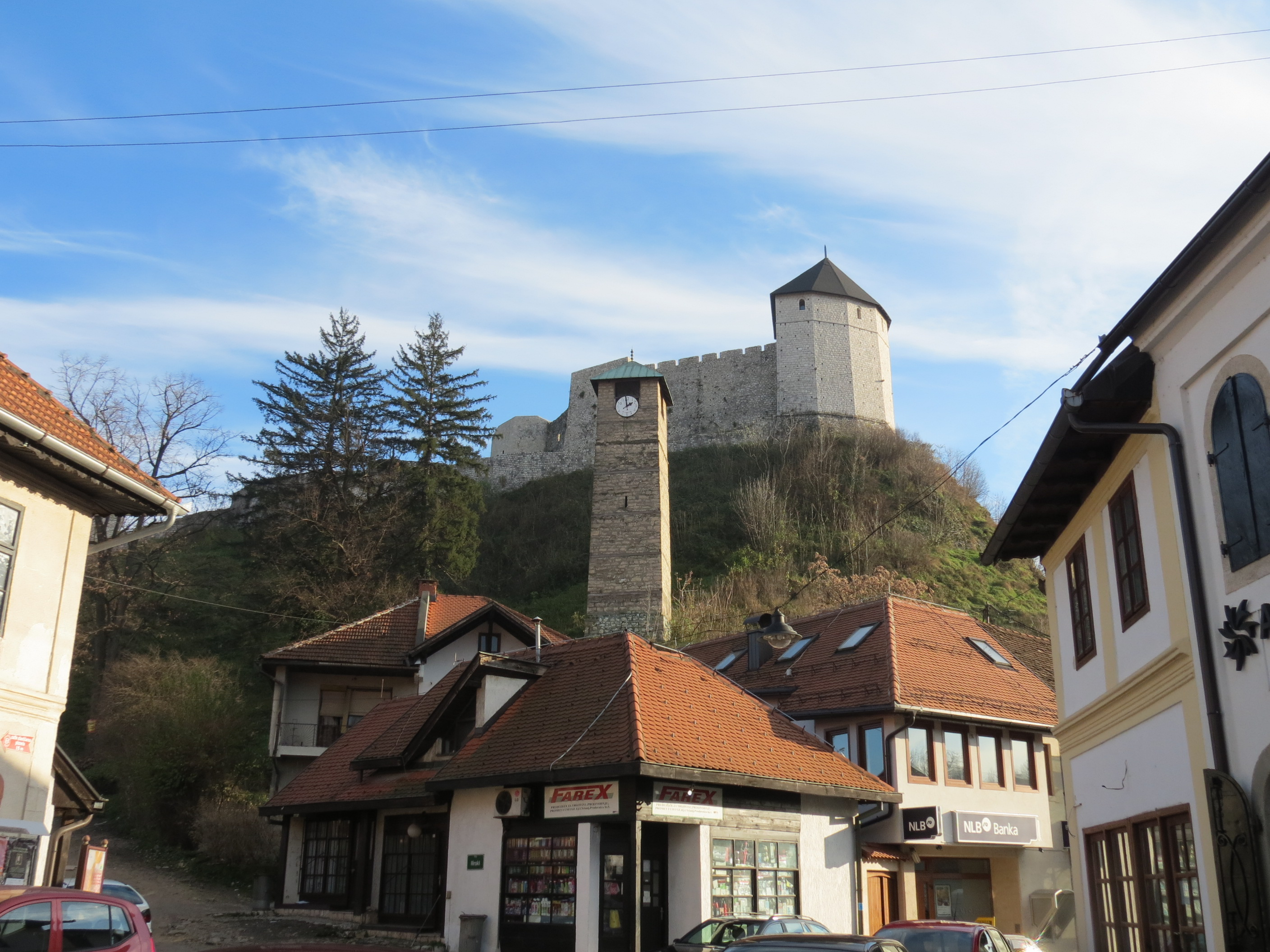
The Castle as seen from the heart of the old town of Tešanj

The Old Town is dominated by the well-preserved fortress, called "Gradina" or simply Tešanj Castle, that overlooks the entire city. The Upper Town Center expands around the castle, rather than the bottom of it. Very early on this castle became the center of economic and cultural life of Tešanj. It was developed along with retail and trade in Tešanj. The town center developed rapidly in the 17th and 18th century, when there were around 40 stores and workshops operating.

The clock tower was built in the 17th century, standing at 18.5 meters tall. Out of a total of 21 clock towers that were built throughout Bosnia and Herzegovina, this tower is one of four that are still working properly. Up until 1890 this tower had shown alaturca time, but the same year Fehim-beg Smailbegović introduced a new time which showed European time.

The grave of the poet Musa Ćazim Ćatić is located in "Obješenica" cemetery in the town center. Even though he was born in Odžak in 1880, he dedicated his whole life and work to the town of Tešanj, where he died in 1915.

From 1929 to 1941, Tešanj was part of the Vrbas Banovina of the Kingdom of Yugoslavia.

== Tourism ==
=== Tešanj Castle ===
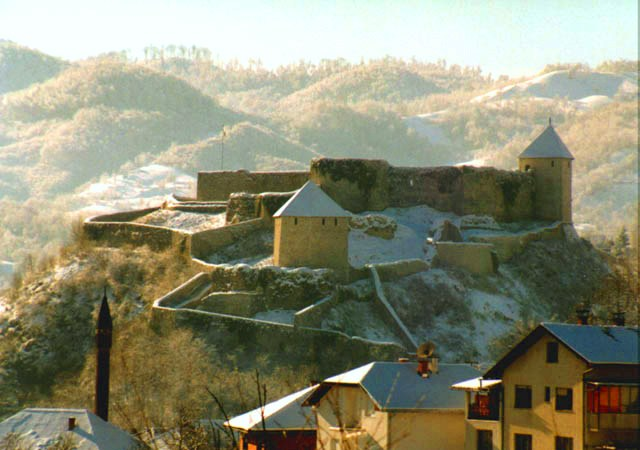
Tešanj Castle

The establishment of this fortification had begun even before the Romans had conquered the region. Exact dates are unknown. It was later enhanced by the Romans, Slavs and the Ottoman forces. It had primarily been a defensive fortification. Tešanj Castle is one of the most significant and biggest castles in Bosnia, with an area of about 6,296 square metres.

During the Ottoman period, the castle had a permanent garrison.

== Demographics ==
=== Population ===
Population of settlements – Tešanj municipality
	Settlement	1961.	1971.	1981.	1991.	2013.
	Total	29,182	34,693	43,692	48,480	43,063
1	Bobare				658	563
2	Bukva				834	962
3	Čaglići				646	643
4	Cerovac				449	458
5	Čifluk				547	576
6	Dobropolje				787	898
7	Drinčići				253	291
8	Džimilić Planje				1,328	1,141
9	Jablanica				831	752
10	Jelah				1,642	2,911
11	Jelah Polje				1,009	353
12	Jevadžije				523	570
13	Kalošević				1,091	1,154
14	Karadaglije				789	752
15	Koprivci				494	487
16	Kraševo				1,218	1,430
17	Lepenica				1,382	1,514
18	Ljetinić				749	849
19	Logobare				304	499
20	Medakovo				781	813
21	Mekiš				539	513
22	Miljanovci				1,060	797
23	Mrkotić				1,303	1,323
24	Novi Miljanovci				1,654	1,999
25	Novo Selo				859	863
26	Orašje Planje				905	900
27	Piljužići				1,840	1,823
28	Potočani				629	1,029
29	Putešić				460	476
30	Raduša				2,729	3,051
31	Rosulje				760	893
32	Šije				2,333	2,582
33	Tešanj		3,901	5,253	5,621	5,257
34	Tešanjka				1,047	429
35	Trepče				1,659	1,593
36	Tugovići				394	448
37	Vukovo				864	1,057

=== Ethnic composition ===
Ethnic composition – Tešanj town
	2013.	1991.	1981.	1971.
Total	5,257 (100,0%)	5,621 (100,0%)	5,253 (100,0%)	3,901 (100,0%)
Bosniaks	5,095 (96,91%)	4,651 (82,74%)	4,376 (83,30%)	3,489 (89,44%)
Croats	76 (1,446%)	206 (3,665%)	160 (3,046%)	174 (4,460%)
Unaffiliated	45 (0,856%)			
Serbs	25 (0,476%)	293 (5,213%)	248 (4,721%)	201 (5,153%)
Montenegrins	6 (0,114%)		12 (0,228%)	9 (0,231%)
Others	6 (0,114%)	79 (1,405%)	62 (1,180%)	12 (0,308%)
Albanians	2 (0,038%)		13 (0,247%)	1 (0,026%)
Unknown	2 (0,038%)			
Yugoslavs		392 (6,974%)	381 (7,253%)	11 (0,282%)
Slovenes			1 (0,019%)	4 (0,103%)

Ethnic composition – Tešanj municipality
	2013.	1991.	1981.	1971.	1961.
Total	43,063 (100,0%)	48,480 (100,0%)	43,692 (100,0%)	34,693 (100,0%)	29,182 (100,0%)
Bosniaks	41,148 (95,55%)	34,941 (72,07%)	30,653 (70,16%)	24,200 (69,75%)	18,270 (62,61%)
Croats	1,462 (3,395%)	8,929 (18,42%)	8,548 (19,56%)	7,603 (21,92%)	6,332 (21,70%)
Serbs	226 (0,525%)	3,071 (6,335%)	3,152 (7,214%)	2,692 (7,759%)	3,464 (11,87%)
Unaffiliated	128 (0,297%)				
Unknown	36 (0,084%)				
Albanians	28 (0,065%)		21 (0,048%)	14 (0,040%)	
Others	24 (0,056%)	492 (1,015%)	177 (0,405%)	107 (0,308%)	113 (0,390%)
Montenegrins	7 (0,016%)		56 (0,128%)	28 (0,081%)	
Roma	3 (0,007%)		66 (0,151%)		
Yugoslavs	1 (0,002%)	1,047 (2,160%)	1,012 (2,316%)	39 (0,112%)	1,003 (3,440%)
Slovenes			5 (0,011%)	7 (0,020%)	
Macedonians			2 (0,005%)	3 (0,009%)	

The town of Tešanj itself had 5,253 residents in 1981, and 6,058 in 1991. Note: Bosniaks are Bosnian nationals with a Muslim religious and/or cultural background.

== Settlements in the municipality ==
Bukva, Blaževci, Bobare, Cerovac, Čaglici, Čifluk, Dobropolje, Drinčići, Džemilić Planje, Jevadžije, Jelah, Jablanica, Jelah Polje, Kalošević, Karadaglije, Koprivci, Kraševo, Lepenica, Logobare, Lončari, Ljetinić, Marin Han, Mrkotić, Miljanovci, Medakovo, Mekiš, Novo Selo, Novi Miljanovci, Orašje Planje, Piljužići, Potočani, Putešić, Raduša, Rosulje, Ripna, Šije, Tešanj, Trepče, Tešanjka, Tugovići, Vrela, Vukovo, Hrvatinovići, and Dubalji.

== Notable people ==
- Nisim Albahari (1916-1991), Yugoslav partisan
- Enis Bešlagić (born 1975), Bosnian actor
- Musa Ćazim Ćatić (1878-1915), Bosnian poet
- Alma Hasanić Grizović (born 1989), Bosnian-Norwegian handball player
- Numan Kurdić (born 1999), Bosnian footballer
- Otto Lang (1908-2006), Bosnian-American film producer
- Admir Ljevaković (born 1984), Bosnian footballer
- Ademaga Mešić (1868-1945), Ustaša Deputy-Leader
- Jasmin Muharemović (born 1965), Bosnian pop-folk singer
- Ajdin Mujagić (born 1998), Bosnian footballer
- Damat Ibrahim Pasha (1517-1601), Ottoman statesman
- Esad Plavi (born 1965), Bosnian pop-folk singer
- Sanela Redžić, Bosnian athlete
- Edin Šaranović (1976-2021), Bosnian footballer
- Anid Travančić (born 1993), Bosnian footballer
- Avdija Vršajević (born 1986), Bosnian footballer
