= Usora Municipality =

Usora Općina Usora (Croatian)
- Municipality
- Location of Usora municipality within Bosnia and Herzegovina.
- Coordinates: 44°41′59″N 18°02′52″E
- Country: Bosnia and Herzegovina
- Entity: Federation of Bosnia and Herzegovina
- Canton: Zenica-Doboj

Government
  - Municipal mayor: Zvonimir Anđelić (HDZ BiH)

Area
  - Total: 46 km^{2} (18 sq mi)

Population (2013 census)
  - Total: 6,603
  - Density: 133/km^{2} (340/sq mi)
- Time zone: UTC+1 (CET)
  - Summer (DST): UTC+2 (CEST)
- Area code: +387 32
- Website: www.usora.com

Usora is a municipality located in Zenica-Doboj Canton of the Federation of Bosnia and Herzegovina, an entity of Bosnia and Herzegovina. It borders with Doboj and Tešanj municipality, and it is named after the Usora River.

== Demographics ==
=== Population ===
Population of settlements – Usora Municipality
	Settlement	1991.	2013.
	Total	5,038	7,568
1	Alibegovci	1,440	1,034
2	Bejići	424	233
3	Makljenovac		361
4	Omanjska	1,233	953
5	Sivša	1,609	1,295
6	Srednja Omanjska	842	693
7	Tešanjka		531
8	Ularice	1,147	777
9	Žabljak	801	659

=== Ethnic composition ===
Ethic composition – Usora Municipality
	2013.	1991.
Total	6,603 (100,0%)	5,038 (100,0%)
Croats	6,095 (92,31%)	4,736 (94,01%)
Bosniaks	384 (5,816%)	136 (2,699%)
Serbs	61 (0,924%)	43 (0,854%)
Unaffiliated	26 (0,394%)	
Roma	19 (0,288%)	
Others	9 (0,136%)	47 (0,933%)
Unknown	5 (0,076%)	
Montenegrins	2 (0,030%)	
Albanians	2 (0,030%)	
Yugoslavs		76 (1,509%)

== See also ==
- Usora (region)
- Usora (river)
