= Teslić =

Teslić Теслић
- Town and municipality
- Coat of arms

- Location of Teslić within Bosnia and Herzegovina

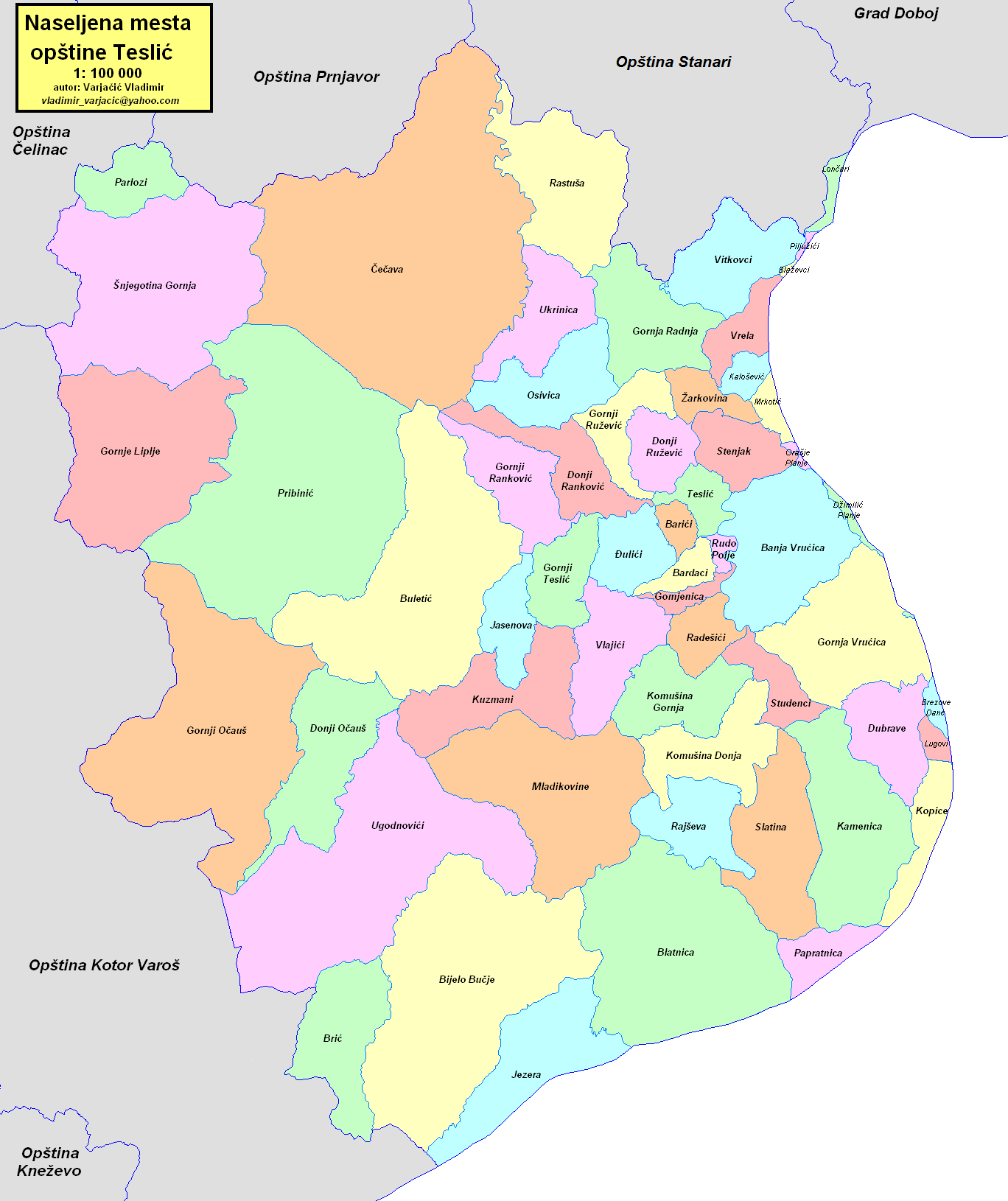
- Coordinates: 44°36′24″N 17°51′36″E
- Country: Bosnia and Herzegovina
- Entity: Republika Srpska
- Geographical region: Central Bosnia/Doboj Region

Government
  - Municipal mayor: Milan Miličević (SDS)
  - Municipality: 837 km^{2} (323 sq mi)

Population (2013 census)
  - Town: 7,518
  - Municipality: 38,536
  - Municipality density: 46.0/km^{2} (119/sq mi)
- Time zone: UTC+1 (CET)
  - Summer (DST): UTC+2 (CEST)
- Area code: 53
- Website: www.opstinateslic.com

Teslić (Serbian Cyrillic: Теслић) is a town in Republika Srpska, Bosnia and Herzegovina. It is situated in the central part of Republika Srpska, on the banks of the Usora River. As of 2013, the town has a population of 7,518 inhabitants, while the municipality has 38,536 inhabitants.

About 5 km (3.1 mi) to the southeast of the town center is the location of the medieval tombstones of Duke Momčilo. Also, Solila is located on the Borja Mountain.

== Geography ==
The municipality of Teslić is located in the northern part of Central Bosnia, encompassing the southern part of the western half of the Republic of Srpska. With a territory of 846 km², it ranks among the largest municipalities in the Republic of Srpska. It borders the municipalities of Doboj, Tešanj, Maglaj, Žepče, Zenica, Travnik, Kotor Varoš, and Čelinac. The town of Teslić itself is situated in the valley of the Velika Usora River, at an altitude of 204 meters.

=== Relief, altitude and geological structure ===
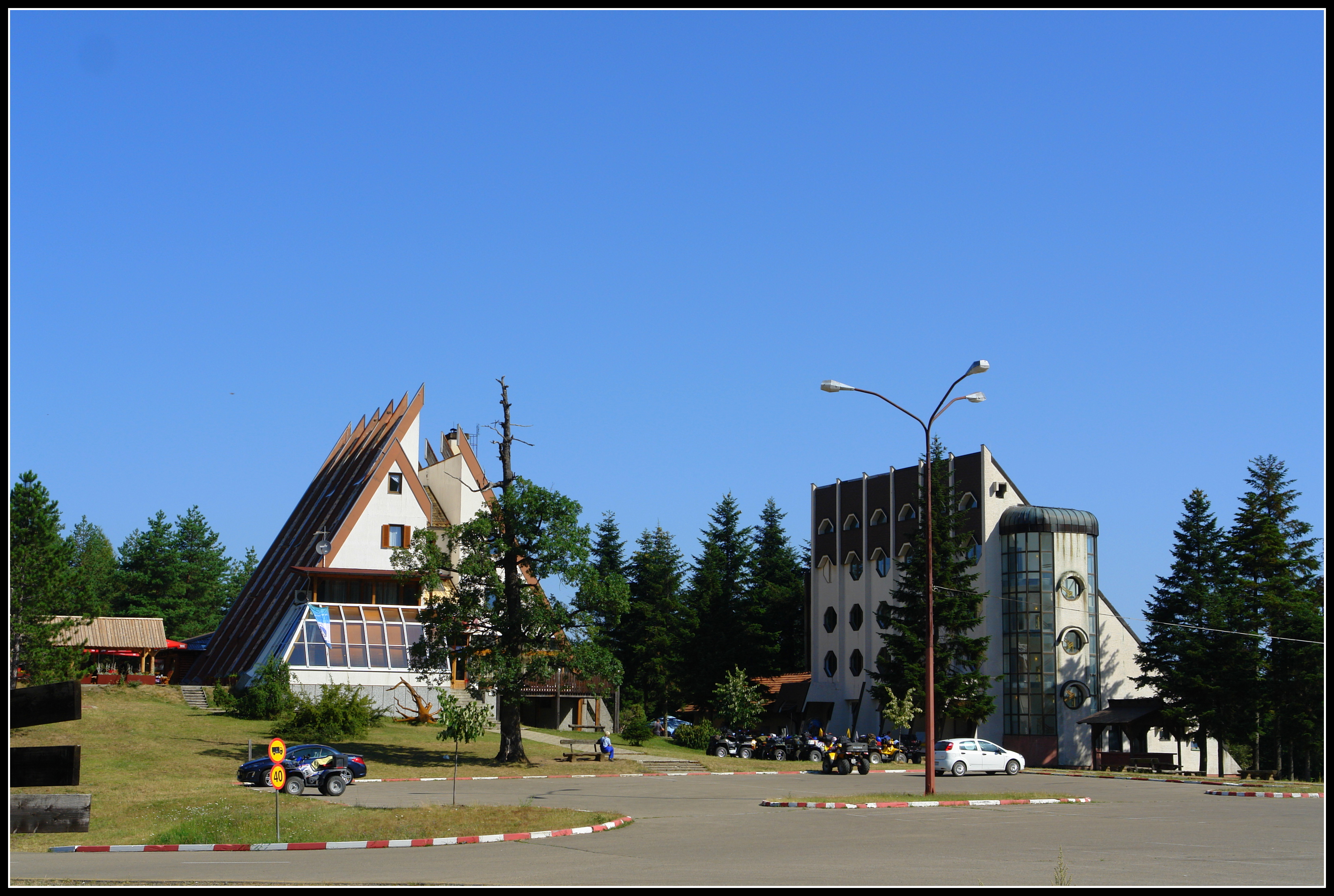
Motel "Hajducke Vode" on Borja mountain

The territory of the Teslić municipality, including most of the Krajina region, belongs to a vast area with specific geological, tectonic, and morphological features, known as the Peri-Pannonian rim or the southern edge of the Pannonian Basin. The entire area, except for minor areas below 200 meters above sea level, consists of hills, low mountains, and medium-height mountains.

In addition, river valleys with gorges between them, plateaus, and a small number of karst caves form the basic morphological features of this area.

The relief of the Teslić municipality can be divided into the following altitude zones. The northeastern part of the municipality, covering about 40% of the total area, lies between 200 and 500 meters above sea level. These are mostly flat and hilly lands along the rivers Velika and Mala Usora, and Mala Ukrina. The far southwestern and southern parts of the municipality are located at elevations above 1,000 meters (the Vuča Mountain reaches a height of 1,387 m); however, the majority of this area lies between 500 and 1,000 meters above sea level.

The geological structure of the wider Teslić area includes diverse mineral resources. Of note are the deposits of brown coal found in the Neogene layers of the Teslić Basin. Coal deposits, though of modest quality, have been identified in the localities of Očauš and Mladikovine, while small reserves of magnesite exist in the areas of Blatnica and Slatina. Chromium deposits have been discovered in several localities in the Borja Mountain area.

The geotectonic relations in the Teslić Basin have resulted in the presence of thermal-mineral springs. The structure of the pedological (soil) cover is an important element of the natural complex, as the usability of certain soil types depends on their qualitative characteristics.

== History ==
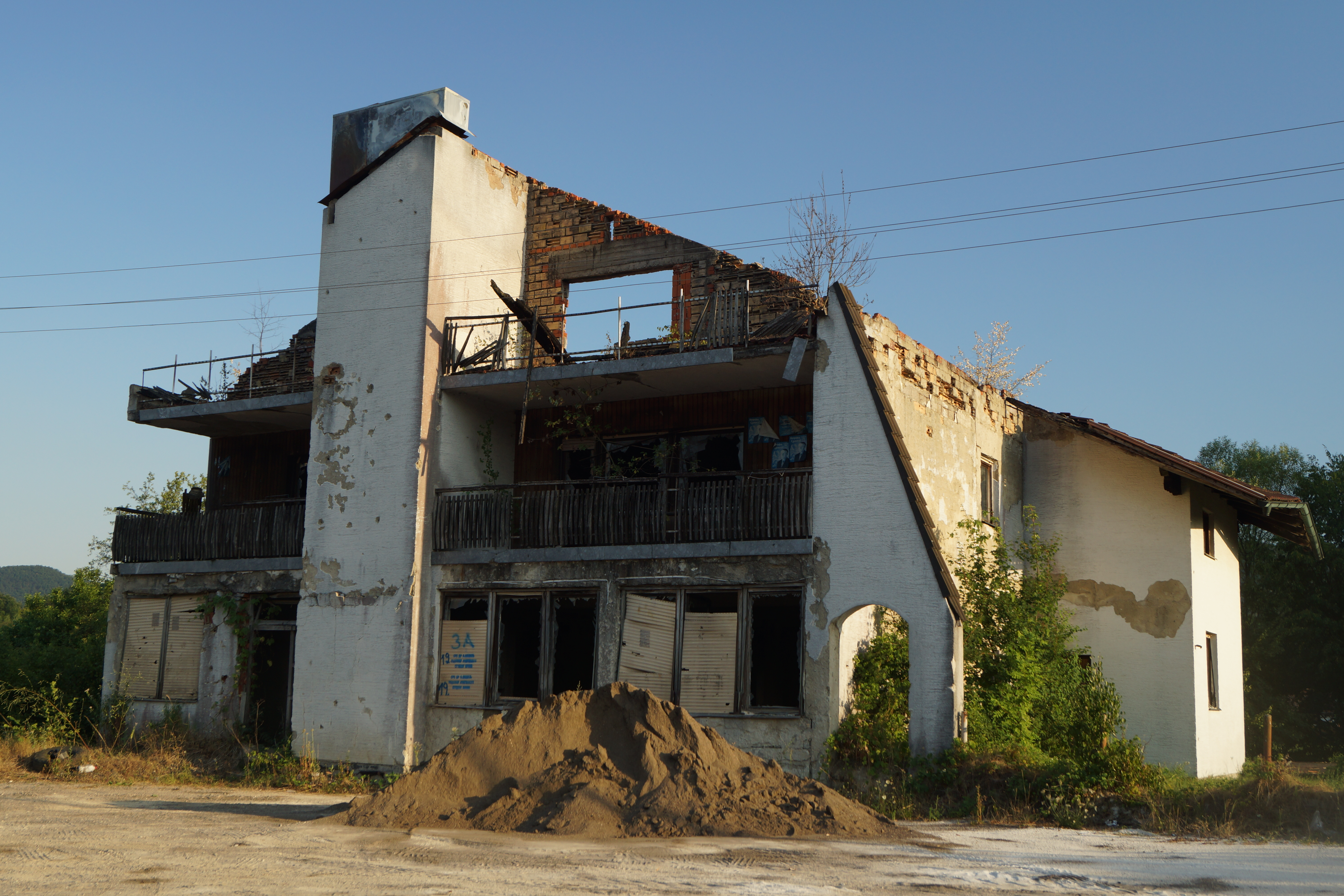
Ruins from the Bosnian war

The town was settled in the 19th century during the first industrialization of Bosnia and Herzegovina. The main industries were the wood and chemical industry. Long before Teslić began to grow, a nearby village called Čečava existed as one of the oldest places people had inhabited. There is archaeological evidence that Čečava existed as early as the 10th century.

From 1929 to 1941, Teslić was part of the Vrbas Banovina of the Kingdom of Yugoslavia.

The municipality saw heavy fighting during the Bosnian War. In the area of Komušina, local Croatian residents organized a defensive force of approximately 500 men in May 1992. Armed attacks by the Army of Republika Srpska (VRS) in May and June extended defensive lines. On 10 August, after a week-long offensive by the VRS, Croatian Defence Council (HVO) defensive lines collapsed and their forces withdrew toward Žepče through Dubrave and Novi Šeher. The HVO and Army of the Republic of Bosnia and Herzegovina (ARBiH) suffered 52 killed and 220 wounded soldiers. On 23 March 1994, the ARBiH, with assistance from the HVO, began an offensive towards Teslić that proved unsuccessful by the time a countrywide ceasefire was implemented on 10 June. A larger and more complex attack was launched on 3 October and lasted nearly two months. The ARBiH made gains in the south but only made marginal progress towards Teslić itself.

Teslić was until the late 1950s among the largest industrial centers in Bosnia and Herzegovina. Today Teslić's industry is mostly based on the production of wood, milk, clothing, telecommunications, the electrical industry, metal industry and construction. Teslić is also known as a tourist destination, mainly because of the Banja Vrućica, а health spa for healing cardiovascular diseases. With a complex of five hotels and a capacity of over 1000 beds, Banja Vrućica has the biggest tourist capacity in Bosnia and Herzegovina. The nearby mountain Borja is an attractive tourist destination with two hotels and sports facilities.

== Demographics ==
According to the 2013 census results, the municipality of Teslić has a population of 38,536 inhabitants.

=== Population ===
Population of settlements – Teslić municipality
	Settlement	1938	1953	1961	1971	1981	1991	2013
1	Banja Vrućica						2,637	2,181
2	Bardaci						653	288
3	Barići						1,151	1,350
4	Bijelo Bučje						1,642	483
5	Blatnica						2,890	1,231
6	Buletić						2,419	1,588
7	Čečava						2,616	1,581
8	Donji Očauš						328	257
9	Donji Ranković						963	910
10	Donji Ružević						2,060	1,310
11	Đulići						1,512	2,086
12	Gomjenica						970	582
13	Gornja Radnja						1,033	530
14	Gornja Vrućica						1,590	387
15	Gornje Liplje						698	475
16	Gornji Očauš						959	526
17	Gornji Ranković						1,249	754
18	Gornji Ružević						661	469
19	Gornji Teslić						1,489	1,885
20	Jasenova						662	216
21	Kamenica						1,667	1,300
22	Mladikovine						2,406	1,435
23	Osivica						1,214	607
24	Pribinić						1,996	1,298
25	Radešići						489	231
26	Rajševa						763	356
27	Rastuša						1,266	592
28	Rudo Polje						543	740
29	Šnjegotina Gornja						909	538
30	Stenjak						1,740	1,071
31	Teslić			3,803	4,874	6,660	8,655	7,518
32	Ugodnovići						927	448
33	Ukrinica						1,159	649
34	Vitkovci						1,307	786
35	Vlajići						839	329
36	Žarkovina						486	313
	Total	35,933	39,764		52,713	60,434	59,854	38,536

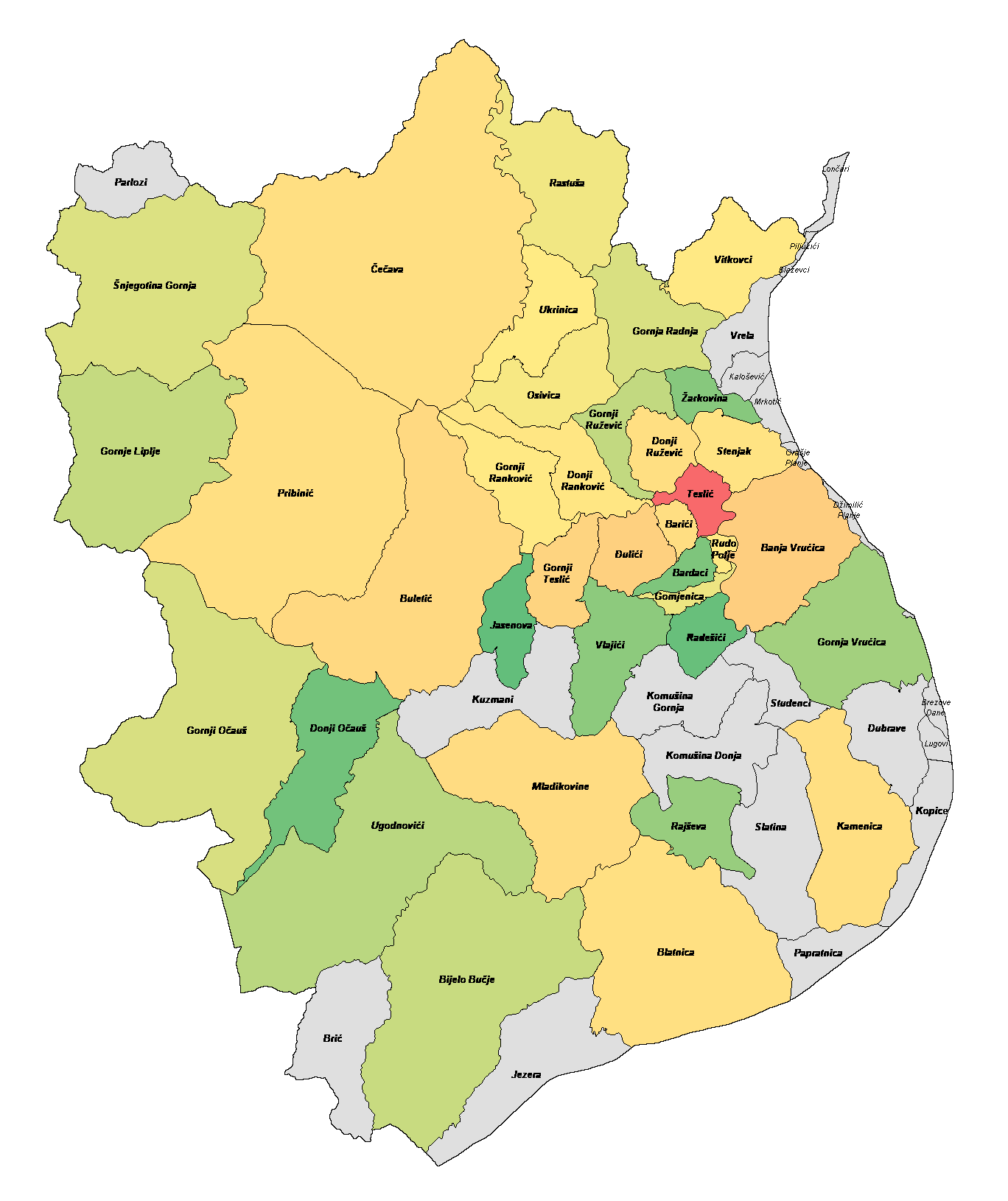
Teslić municipality by population proportional to the settlement with the highest and lowest population

=== Ethnic composition ===
Ethnic composition – Teslić town
Nationality	2013	1991	1981	1971
Total	7,518 (100.0%)	8,655 (100.0%)	6,660 (100.0%)	4,874 (100.0%)
Serbs	N/A	3,571 (41.26%)	2,465 (37.01%)	1,951 (40.03%)
Yugoslavs	N/A	1,987 (22.96%)	1,557 (23.38%)	69 (1.416%)
Bosniaks	N/A	1,889 (21.83%)	1 568 (23.54%)	1,595 (32.72%)
Croats	N/A	766 (8.850%)	954 (14.32%)	1,103 (22.63%)
Others	N/A	442 (5,107%)	57 (0.856%)	102 (2.093%)
Montenegrins	N/A	N/A	51 (0.766%)	34 (0.698%)
Slovenes	N/A	N/A	7 (0.105%)	10 (0.205%)
Macedonians	N/A	N/A	1 (0.015%)	1 (0.021%)
Albanians	N/A	N/A	N/A	9 (0.185%)
Total	7,518 (100.0%)	8,655 (100.0%)	6,660 (100.0%)	4,874 (100.0%)

Ethnic composition – Teslić municipality
Nationality	2013	1991	1981	1971
Serbs	29,041 (75.36%)	32,962 (55.07%)	35,024 (57.95%)	32,756 (62.14%)
Bosniaks	7,184 (18.64%)	12,802 (21.39%)	11,148 (18.45%)	10.000 (18.97%)
Croats	1,442 (3.742%)	9,525 (15.91%)	10,744 (17.78%)	9,467 (17.96%)
Others	869 (2.255%)	1,100 (1.838%)	204 (0.338%)	285 (0.541%)
Yugoslavs	N/A	3,465 (5.789%)	3,155 (5,221%)	108 (0.205%)
Montenegrins	N/A	N/A	93 (0.154%)	67 (0.127%)
Roma	N/A	N/A	43 (0.071%)	N/A
Slovenes	N/A	N/A	8 (0.013%)	18 (0.034%)
Albanians	N/A	N/A	8 (0.013%)	9 (0.017%)
Macedonians	N/A	N/A	7 (0.012%)	3 (0.006%)
Total	38,536 (100.0%)	59,854 (100.0%)	60,434 (100.0%)	52,713 (100.0%)

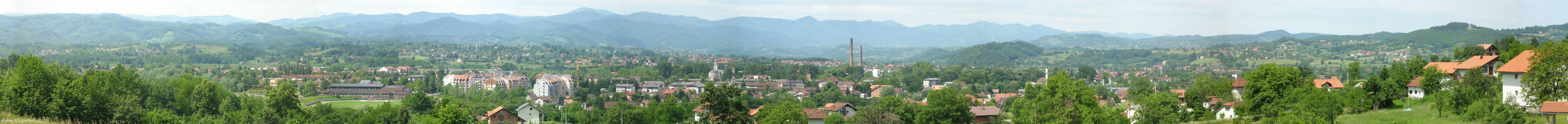
A panorama of Teslić

== Economy ==
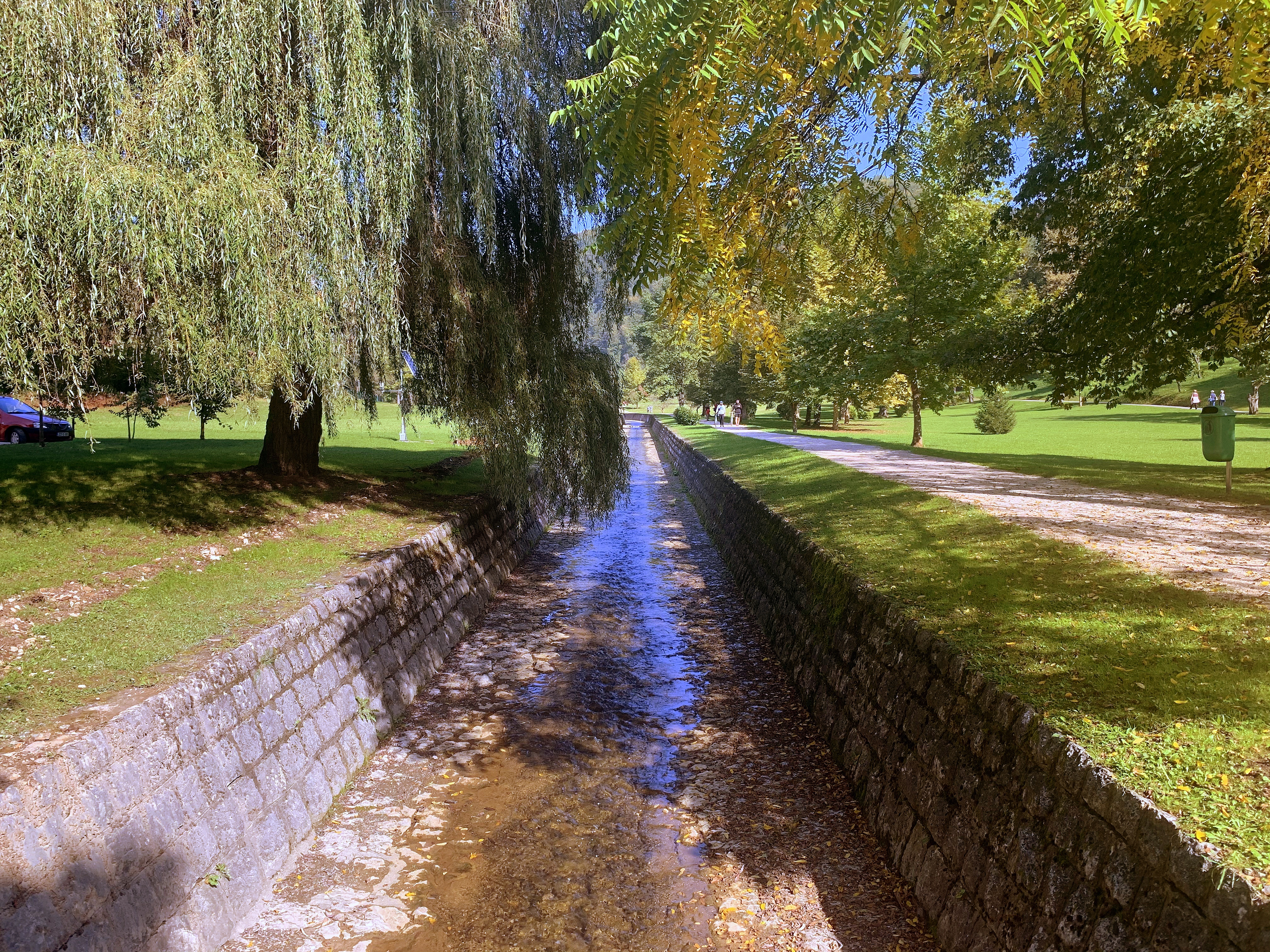
Grabovac creek

The following table gives a preview of the total number of registered people employed in professional fields per their core activity (as of 2018):

Professional field	Total
Agriculture, forestry and fishing	290
Mining and quarrying	1
Manufacturing	2,910
Electricity, gas, steam and air conditioning supply	55
Water supply; sewerage, waste management and remediation activities	125
Construction	445
Wholesale and retail trade, repair of motor vehicles and motorcycles	1,139
Transportation and storage	252
Accommodation and food services	527
Information and communication	20
Financial and insurance activities	52
Real estate activities	3
Professional, scientific and technical activities	85
Administrative and support service activities	8
Public administration and defense; compulsory social security	330
Education	681
Human health and social work activities	330
Arts, entertainment and recreation	29
Other service activities	117
Total	7,399

== Notable people ==
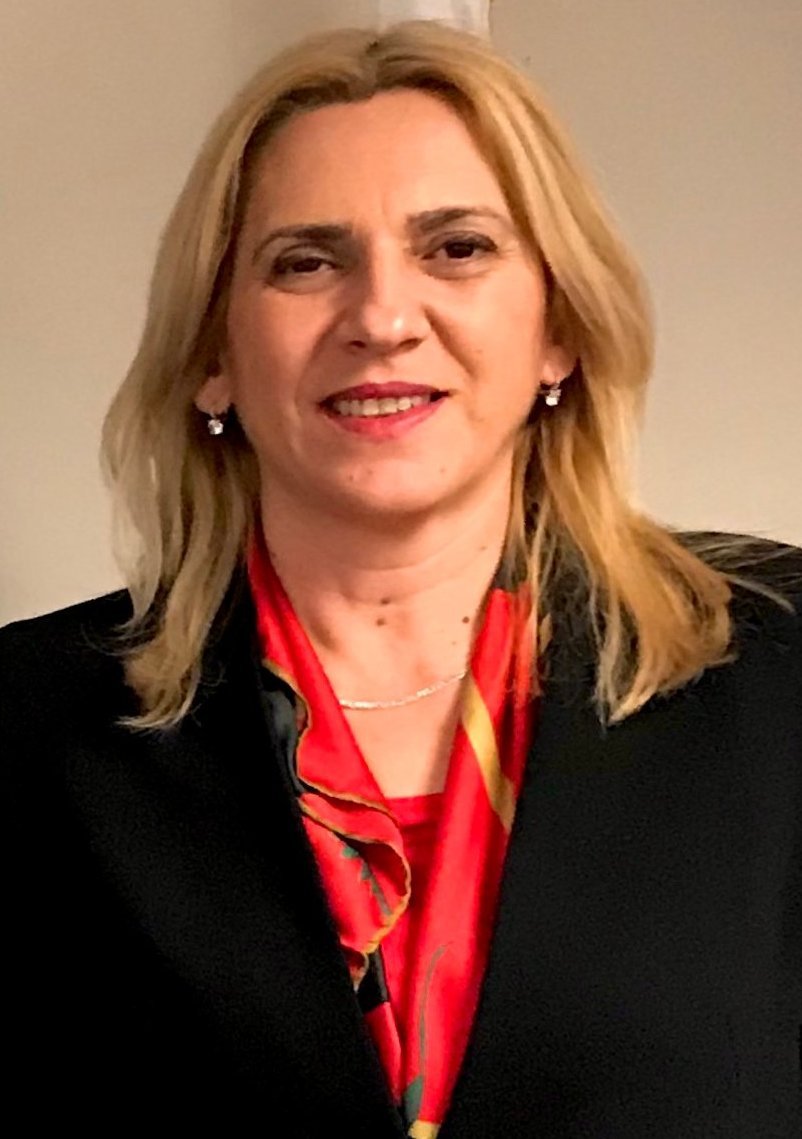
Serb President of the Presidency of Bosnia and Herzegovina Željka Cvijanović

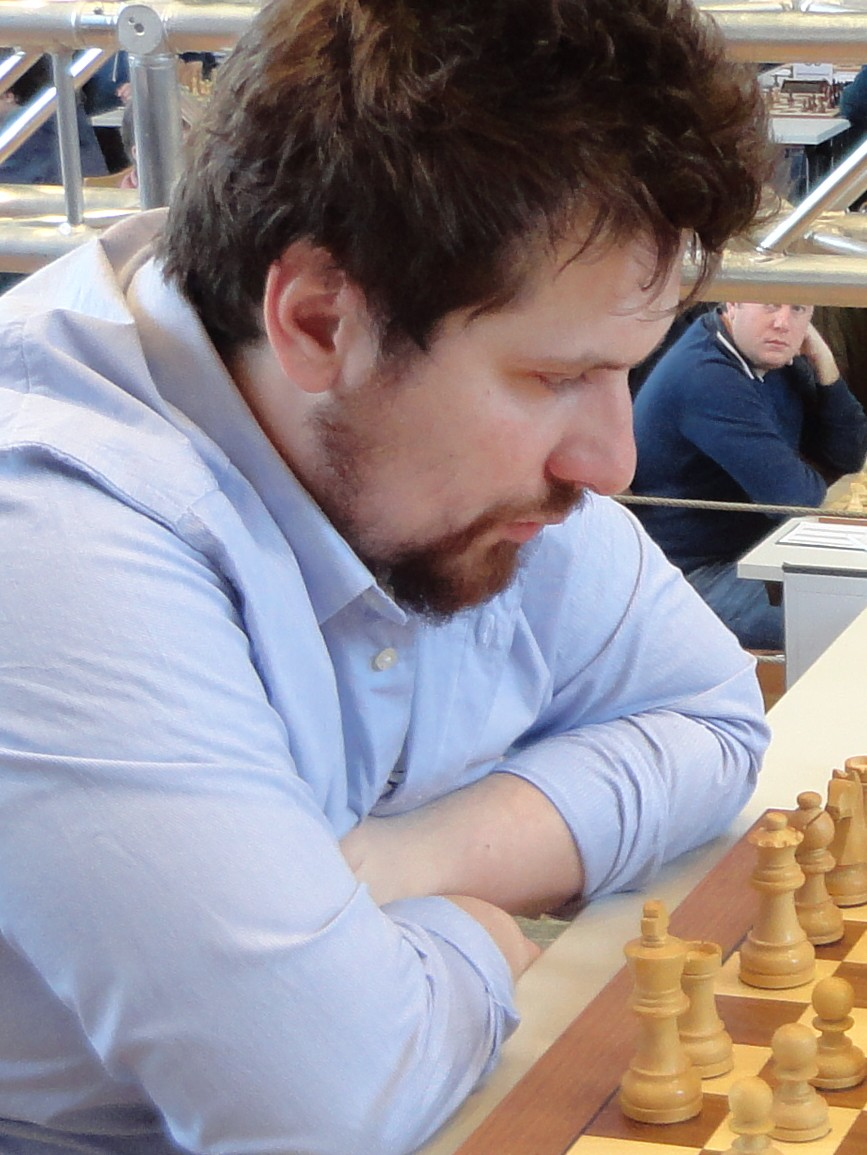
Chess grandmaster Borki Predojević

- Borki Predojević, professional chess player
- Dragan Blatnjak, footballer
- Slaviša Gačić, professional footballer
- Vladimir Petrović, footballer
- Željka Cvijanović, President of the Presidency of Bosnia and Herzegovina
- Dragan Bogdanić, Minister of Health and Social Welfare of Republika Srpska
- Slobodan Stojanović, Orthodox saint and child martyr

== See also ==
- Jezera, formerly a village in Teslić
- Kusići, formerly a sub-village of Jezera
- Vrela, a village in Teslić
- Žarkovina, a village in Teslić
- Usora River
- Krstova Gora hill (formerly Gračun)
