= 7th Muslim Brigade =

- 7. muslimanska viteška oslobodilačka brigada
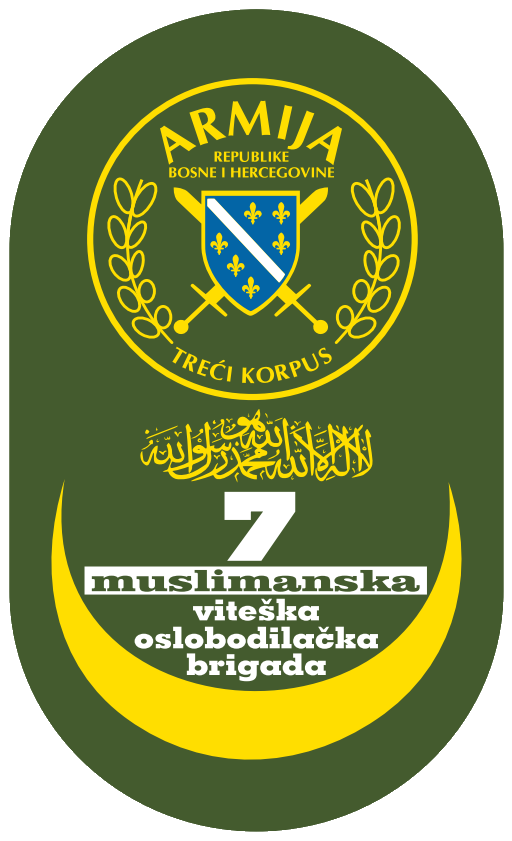
- The patch of the 7th Muslim Brigade (as of 1995); worn on issued armbands, mostly for ceremonial use
- Active: 1992-2004
- Country: Republic of Bosnia and Herzegovina
- Allegiance: Army of the Republic of Bosnia and Herzegovina
- Branch: Army
- Type: Infantry
- Role: Assault, Mountain warfare
- Size: Brigade
- Garrison/HQ: Zenica
- Nickname: "Sedma muslimanska" (The Seventh Muslim)
- Motto: "Tekbir – Allahu Ekber"
- Colors: Green; White
- March: "7. muslimanska brigada"
- Anniversaries: November 17
- Engagements: Bosnian War; Siege of Sarajevo; Croat–Bosniak War; Lašva Valley counteroffensive; Battle of Travnik; Battle of Bugojno; Battle of Vareš; Attack on Teslić; Assault on Vlašić; Operation Tekbir '95; Battle of Vozuća

Commanders
- Emir: Mahmut Karalić
- First official Commander: Asim Koričić - from late 1992 until April 1, 1993.
- Chief of Staff: Amir Kubura - from August 6, 1993, to April 4, 1994.
- Commander: Šerif Patković - from April 4, 1994, to August 17, 1995.
- Commander: Halil Brzina - from August 17, 1995, leading the brigade until its post-war reorganization.

The 7th Muslim Brigade (7. Muslimanska brigada), officially known as the 7th Muslim Knights Liberation Brigade (7. Muslimanska Viteška oslobodilačka brigada) was an all-volunteer assault brigade of the 3rd Corps of the Army of the Republic of Bosnia and Herzegovina (ARBiH), headquartered in Zenica. During the Bosnian War (1992-1995), the 7th Muslim Brigade fought on various battlefields throughout Bosnia & Herzegovina, facing VRS forces in the areas of Visoko, Mt. Igman, Vozuća, Kladanj, Teslić, Mt. Vlašić, Ilijaš, Vozuća, Mt. Ozren, and others, and facing HVO forces in and around Zenica, Kakanj, Travnik, Vitez, Busovača, Vareš, Fojnica, and Bugojno during the ARBiH-HVO conflict. The brigade captured nearly 1,100 km² of territory, including numerous aforementioned towns and villages, from HVO and VRS forces during the course of the war.

More than 4,000 fighters passed through the ranks of the brigade, of whom 252 were killed in combat and over 1,800 were injured. 30 members of the 7th Muslim Knights Liberation Brigade were awarded the highest ARBiH wartime honor, the “Golden Lily”.

== Formation and structure ==
The 7th Muslim Mountain Brigade was formed on November 17, 1992, in Zenica, composed of Bosniak volunteers from Travnik, Zenica, Kakanj, Vitez, Busovača, Žepče, and Vareš. At the time of its formation, the brigade's structure was as follows:

-1st Battalion (HQ in Travnik): Composed of various organized MOS (MusSlim Armed Forces) detachments from the areas of Travnik and Vitez.
-2nd Battalion (HQ in Zenica): Formed from the 7th Muslim Battalion of the 1st Zenica Brigade (7. Muslimanski bataljon 1. Zeničke brigade) and various MOS units from Pojske, Orahovica, and Begov Han.
-3rd Battalion (HQ in Kakanj): Composed of the Kakanj-based “Muslim Forces” detachment and the “Šehid Resul” detachment from Kaćuni.

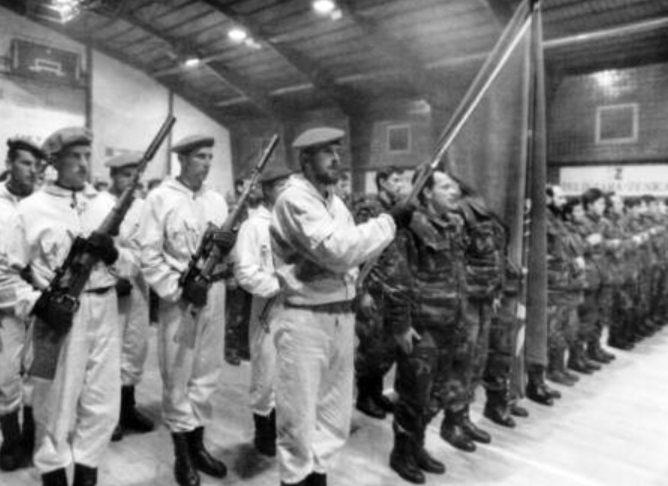
Formation ceremony of the 7th Muslim Brigade in Zenica, November 17, 1992

Following the formation of the Zenica-based 3rd Corps on December 1, 1992, the 7th Muslim Brigade enters its ranks.

In 1993, a Reconnaissance-Sabotage Company (Diverzantsko-izviđačka četa) was formed, made up of fighters from existing reconnaissance, sabotage, and assault units of the brigade; this company operated directly under brigade command.

On February 22, 1994, following the formation of the 7th Corps (7. korpus) in Travnik, the existing 1st Travnik Battalion of the 7th Muslim Mountain Brigade was reorganized into the 37th Muslim Light Brigade (37. Muslimanska lahka brigada) (renamed in 1995 to the 737th Light Brigade (737. Muslimanska lahka brigada)), which entered the ranks of the newly formed 7th Corps. At the same time, the 3rd Battalion of the 7th Muslim Mountain Brigade, composed mostly of fighters from Kakanj and Kaćuni, was renamed as the 1st Battalion. By late 1994, a new 3rd Battalion was formed in Zenica with personnel from across Central Bosnia.

In April 1995, a 4th Battalion was formed, based in Janjići, Zenica.

On April 14, 1994, the brigade was given the honorary title “Glorious,” making its full name the 7th Muslim Glorious Mountain Brigade (7. Muslimanska Slavna brdska brigada).

On May 13, 1995, it was reformed as a liberation brigade and granted the highest honorary title “Knights,” becoming the 7th Muslim Knights Liberation Brigade (7. Muslimanska Viteška oslobodilačka brigada).

Following the signing of the Dayton Peace Agreement in December 1995, the brigade was incorporated into the Army of the Federation of Bosnia and Herzegovina as the 7th Knights Mechanized Brigade (7. Viteška mehanizovana brigada), which was later disbanded upon the formation of the Armed Forces of Bosnia and Herzegovina (OSBiH) in late 2004.

During the war, volunteers from all regions of Bosnia joined the ranks of the 7th Muslim Brigade. Some units with significant numbers of volunteers who transferred to the brigade included: the 306/706th Light Brigade (306/706. lahka brigada) from Travnik, the 318/328th Glorious Mountain Brigade (318/328. Slavna brdska brigada)from Zavidovići, the 309/329th Mountain Brigade (309/329. brdska brigada)from Kakanj, as well as the 303rd Knights Mountain (303. Viteška brdska brigada), the 314th Glorious Mountain (314. Slavna brdska brigada), and the 330th Light Brigades (330. lahka brigada)from Zenica.

Despite various speculation, the 7th Muslim Brigade never incorporated a significant number of foreign volunteers from North African and Middle Eastern nations, referred to commonly as “Mujahideen”. On August 13, 1993, the “El-Mudžahidin” detachment (Odred "El-Mudžahidin")composed of foreign Islamic volunteers and local Bosniak adherents to Salafi Islam, was formed near Travnik. During this period, one company from the 7th Muslim Brigade's 1st Battalion, 80 fighters strong, left its ranks and joined the newly formed detachment. In total, somewhere between 150 and 200 fighters from the 7th Muslim Brigade joined the ranks of “El-Mudžahidin”, mostly in mid-1993 right after its formation. War crimes committed by members of the “El-Mudžahidin” detachment were, in various cases, falsely attributed to the 7th Muslim Brigade, which was later cleared up during post-war ICTY trials of the brigade's commanders tasked with deducing whether or not the 7th Muslim Brigade had “de facto” control over rogue foreign volunteer detachments operating in Central Bosnia in mid-1993, prior to the formation of “El-Mudžahidin”; the trials concluded that this was not the case.

== Combat history ==
The first operation of the 7th Muslim Mountain Brigade (7. Muslimanska brdska brigada) was its participation in the initial ARBiH attempt to break the Siege of Sarajevo, known as Operation “Koverta”. In December 1992, together with various other units of the 3rd and 6th Corps, the 7th Muslim Brigade launched an attack on the fortified positions of the VRS at the strategic elevation “Višegrad” on the Visoko battlefield. The brigade's fighters, despite suffering heavy losses, managed to capture the position; however, superior artillery power of the VRS forced them to abandon the attempt to break the blockade and withdraw from the position.

Soon after, the first clashes between the ARBiH and the HVO erupted in Central Bosnia. One of the earliest actions against HVO forces occurred in the village of Dusina, north of Busovača, in January 1993. The clash involved the 1st Company of the 2nd Battalion of the 7th Muslim Brigade and HVO units from Busovača which held Dusina; after a brief battle, the village was in the hands of ARBiH forces.

In the coming months, as tensions escalated, open hostilities broke out in Zenica in mid-April 1993. The 7th Muslim Mountain Brigade, together with other Zenica-based military and police units, were tasked with securing the city and expelling HVO forces, namely the local HVO brigade “Jure Francetić” (Brigada “Jure Francetić”). Following a short battle, the “Jure Francetić” brigade was forced out of Zenica, retreating to new positions west of the city in the village of Gornji Čajdraš. In the subsequent days, the 7th Muslim Brigade broke through the positions of the “Jure Francetić” brigade in Gornji Čajdraš and Kuber, with some of its fighters surrendering to ARBiH forces, while others managed to withdraw toward HVO positions in Vitez.

Between June and July 1993, the 7th Muslim Mountain Brigade engaged in intense battles against both Bosnian Serb and Bosnian Croat forces. On June 4, 1993, fighting broke out in Travnik between the ARBiH and HVO. In an attempt to use the situation to their advantage, the VRS launched an attack on the village of Bijelo Bučje, west of Travnik, where they initially achieved successes before being halted by the 1st Battalion of the 7th Muslim Mountain Brigade.

On June 5, 1993, the HVO began to withdraw from Travnik and consolidate new positions around the city. One of these positions, in Mešče, was assaulted by the 1st Battalion of the 7th Muslim Brigade, resulting in the collapse of the HVO positions in that area and the capture of a sizable amount of military equipment. Two days later, on June 7, the 7th brigade captured the villages of Ušice and Ovnak, which in turn lifted the blockade on the village of Čukle. On the same day, parts of the 7th Muslim Mountain Brigade engaged in fierce combat with HVO forces around Novo Selo, capturing it shortly after midday and advancing towards Grahovčići, which they also captured that same day. These battles between June 5 and 7, 1993, enabled the creation of a corridor between Zenica and Travnik entirely under ARBiH control. By June 9, the HVO had been entirely pushed out of Travnik, with some of their forces managing to link up with HVO forces in Vitez while another portion chose to surrender to the VRS on Mt. Vlašić.

Shortly after the consolidation of Travnik, fierce battles were fought around Kakanj between ARBiH and HVO forces. On June 12, 1993, the 7th Muslim Mountain Brigade was dispatched toward Kakanj from the direction of Ovnak and commenced its combat operations the following morning, June 13, 1993. On that day, soldiers of the brigade broke through the defense lines of the HVO's “Kotromanić” brigade (Brigada “Kotromanić”), capturing Teševsko Brdo and the village of Teševo, thereby taking control of the territory around Kraljeva Sutjeska.

On June 14, the fighting spread to the areas of Čatići and Kraljeva Sutjeska, where HVO forces were completely encircled. The next day, June 15, 1993, the “Kotromanić” brigade surrendered to the ARBiH forces in Ćatići and Kraljevska Sutjeska under UNPROFOR protection, and by June 16, 1993, the city of Kakanj and its surroundings were fully in ARBiH hands.

At the beginning of July 1993, the 7th Muslim Mountain Brigade, in conjunction with the 310th Fojnica (310. brdska brigada) and the 317th Gornji Vakuf Mountain Brigades (317. brdska brigada), led the operation to capture Fojnica, which had up until that point been in HVO hands. By July 3, 1993, after only a few days of intense fighting, Fojnica was entirely under ARBiH control.

In November 1993 the 7th Muslim Mountain Brigade was sent toward the Vareš enclave, also under HVO control- an area where, two weeks earlier, a war crime had been committed against Bosniak civilians in Stupni Do, resulting in the slaughter of 37 civilians, many of whom were burned alive in their homes. In the early morning hours of November 4, 1993, after several days of clashes around the enclave, the 7th Muslim Mountain Brigade advanced from the west and became the first ARBiH unit to enter Vareš, linking up in the city center with fighters from the 206th Zvornik Glorious Mountain Brigade (206. Slavna brdska brigada) who had broken through HVO lines from the north. The successful execution of this operation also enabled the release of 110 Bosniak civilians who had been seeking refuge in the UNPROFOR base in the center of Vareš.

In July 1993, an operation by the VRS codenamed “Lukavac-93” led to the rapid fall of Trnovo and Mt. Bjelašnica, south of Sarajevo, placing Mt. Igman, the gateway to besieged Sarajevo, under direct threat. Under orders from the ARBiH General Staff, a tactical group composed of the 1st Battalion of the 7th Muslim Mountain Brigade, a platoon from the 312th Travnik Mountain Brigade (312. brska brigada) and an assault battalion from the 17th Krajina Glorious Mountain Brigade (17. Slavna Krajiška brdska brigada) was sent to Mt. Igman to prevent further VRS advances on following a serious deterioration of the military situation on the mountain. Between July and August 1993, the 1st Battalion of the 7th Muslim Mountain Brigade fought intensive battles to defend Mt. Igman against daily VRS assault. As a result of their successful defense of Mt. Igman, the 1st Battalion received a special commendation from President Alija Izetbegović and was declared the best battalion of the ARBiH in 1993.

After the signing of the Washington Agreement and the cessation of hostilities between the ARBiH and HVO in early 1994, the 3rd Corps was finally able to reorient its efforts towards VRS forces. On April 27, 1994, forces of the 7th Muslim Glorious Mountain Brigade were sent to the Kladanj–Vlasenica battlefield, in the area of responsibility of the 2nd Corps (2. korpus), where they provided support to the local 1st Muslim-Podrinje Mountain Brigade (1. Muslimansko-Podrinjska brdska brigada) in combat on the Vlasenica front, specifically toward the strategic elevations of Kočar and Tamburića Kosa. On May 3, 1994, fighters of the 7th Muslim Brigade, together with the 1st Muslim-Podrinje Mountain Brigade and the General Staff's Special Operations Detachment “Black Swans” (Specijalna Jedinica za Posebne Namjene GŠ "Crni Labudovi"), broke through the defensive positions of the VRS’ 1st Vlasenica Light Infantry Brigade (1. Vlasenička laka pješadijska brigada) at Kočar and Tamburića Kosa, therein capturing the first areas of the Serb-held Vlasenica municipality.

In May 1994, parts of the 7th Muslim Glorious Mountain Brigade were sent to the Teslić–Šerići front in order to reinforce ARBiH defensive lines. During June and July 1994, elements of the 7th brigade participated in a joint operation of the 2nd and 3rd Corps on Mt. Ozren, where they achieved significant success in capturing and subsequently defending the strategic elevation 706, as well as in defending elevation 715 and capturing Podmalovan hill. Ultimately, however, the operation as a whole was unsuccessful in its goal of capturing the strategic village of Vozuća.

On August 20, 1994, units of the 1st Battalion of the 7th Muslim Glorious Mountain Brigade halted a reinforced assault by VRS forces at Velika Karanovica, northeast of Mt. Vlašić.

At the beginning of October 1994, the 7th Muslim Glorious Mountain Brigade, together with the “El-Mudžahidin” detachment (Odred “El-Mudžahidin”), the 330th Light Brigade (330. lahka brigada), and the 319th Mountain Brigade (319. brdska brigada), spearheaded an offensive operation on the Teslić–Šerići battlefield. During a month of intense clashes, over 100 km^{2} of territory were captured from the VRS 27th Derventa Motorized Brigade (27. Derventska motorizovana brigada) in the area of the Podjezero basin and the broader region of Vučja Mountain. A subsequent counteroffensive by the VRS 27th Motorized Brigade in December led to a reclaiming of around half of its lost territory in the region.

On January 28, 1995, the 7th Muslim Glorious Mountain Brigade held a ceremony marking its second anniversary in Zenica, which was attended by President Alija Izetbegović, Chief of the ARBiH General Staff Rasim Delić, and many other dignitaries.

Between March 20 and 23, 1995, the 7th brigade participated in the joint operation of the 3rd and 7th Corps named “Domet-1”, with the goal of capturing the entirety of the strategically crucial Mt. Vlašić. Earlier, on February 24, 1995, members of the 737th Muslim Light Brigade (the former 1st Battalion of the 7th Muslim Brigade), in cooperation with fighters of the 712th Glorious Travnik Mountain Brigade (712. Slavna brdska brigada), carried out a sabotage operation on Mt. Vlašić’s Galica plateau, during which 62 fighters of the VRS's 22nd Infantry Brigade (22. pješadijska brigada) were eliminated. A month later, assault units from the 3rd and 7th Corps, supported by units of the General Staff, launched Operation “Domet-1”. During this operation, reconnaissance-sabotage platoons from the 1st and 2nd Battalions of the 7th Muslim Glorious Mountain Brigade managed to encircle and capture Veliki and Mali Šantić as well as Mt. Vlašić’s most dominant peak, Opaljenik, home to its strategically valuable radio relay station. During this operation, the 7th Brigade also captured notable amounts of military equipment and material.

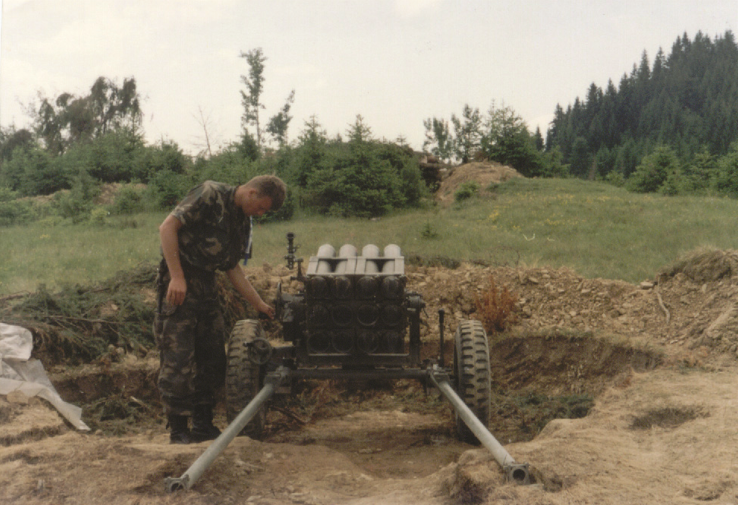
A 7th Muslim Brigade soldier inspects a Type 63 multiple rocket launcher, used on the Nabožić battlefield during Operation "Tekbir-95", June 1995

During June and July 1995, the 7th Muslim Knights Liberation Brigade participated in the final attempt to break the Siege of Sarajevo, known as Operation “Tekbir-95”. Together with the 375th Liberation Brigade (375. oslobodilačka brigada)from Tešanj and the 3rd Maneuver Battalion (3. manevarski bataljon) from Kakanj, the 7th brigade was tasked with capturing Ravni Nabožić mountain on the Ilijaš battlefield, in the area of responsibility of the 16th Division of the 1st Corps (16. divizija KoV 1. korpusa). After a month of extremely intense fighting, the 7th Muslim Brigade managed to completely secure Ravni Nabožić; however, the overall operation to lift the siege proved unsuccessful, and Sarajevo remained besieged. Following the cessation of the operation, the 7th Muslim Brigade returned to Mt. Ozren, where over the next two months it participated in various reconnaissance and sabotage operations against VRS forces in that area.

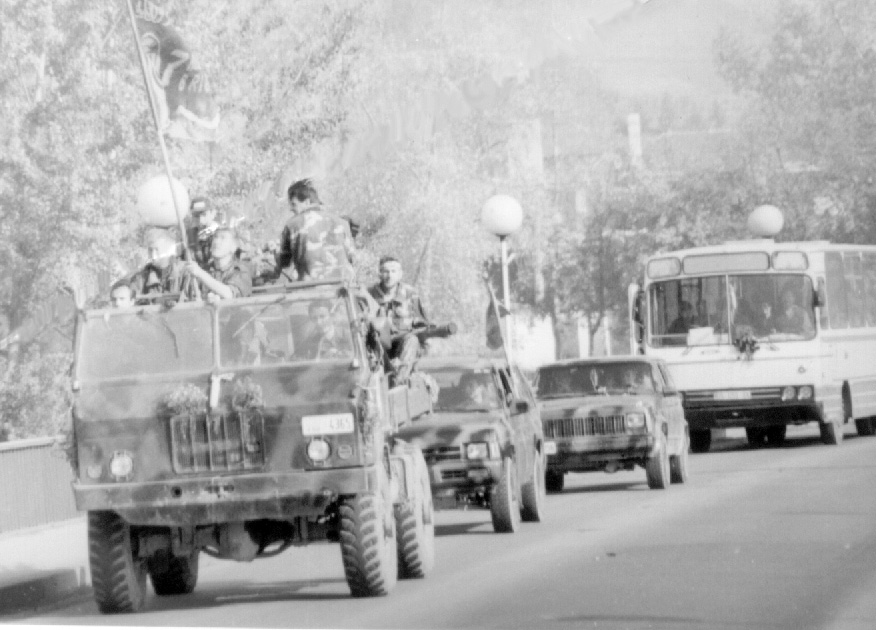
Soldiers of the 7th Muslim Brigade, riding on a TAM 110 T7 B/BV truck, parade through the Zenica city center with their battle flag following their success on the Vozuća battlefield during Operation "Farz-95", September 13th 1995

The final major action of the 7th Muslim Knight Liberation Brigade was its participation in the Operation “Farz-95”, the offensive to capture Vozuća and the Mt. Ozren region. In the early morning hours of September 10, 1995, the combined forces of the 7th Muslim Knight Liberation Brigade, 375th Liberation Brigade, 1st Zenica Maneuver Battalion (1. manevarski bataljon), and the 3rd Military Police Battalion (3. bataljon vojne policije) captured the locations of Ljeskovac, Voštan, Mljevići, and Pejići, and then advanced toward the Stošnica and Krivaja rivers. After the capture of Ljeskovac, the 7th Muslim Knight Liberation Brigade independently captured the Stog ridge (935m) and the Stog hilltop, advancing into the Velika Rasječenica–Stošnica region. At the same time, the 3rd Sabotage Detachment (3. diverzantski odred), together with forces of the 3rd Reconnaissance-Sabotage Company (3. izviđačko-diverzantska četa) and the anti-tank company “Green Berets” from the 319th Liberation Brigade (Protivoklopna četa "Zelene Beretke" 319. oslobodilačke brigade), in cooperation with elements of the 7th Muslim Knight Liberation Brigade and the 329th Kakanj Mountain Brigade, captured the area of Gradac–Oštrić–Gradić and the strongholds of Čukura and Izgorjelica, penetrating into the Krivaja River near the village of Stog. Prior to linking up with units of the 7th Muslim Brigade, fighters of the 3rd Maneuver Battalion (3. manevarski bataljon) had captured positions along the Podvolujak–Ravno Ivlje sector. Simultaneously, joint units of the 3rd Corps’ 35th Division (35. divizija KoV 3. korpusa), composed of the “El-Mudžahidin” detachment (Odred “El-Mudžahidin”) as well as the 2nd Zenica (2. manevarski bataljon), 4th Zavidovići (4. manevarski bataljon), and 5th Maglaj Maneuver Battalions (5. manevarski bataljon) and elements of the 328th Zavidovići Mountain Brigade (328. brdska brigada), advanced along the right bank of the Krivaja River with the task of capturing the Okretaljka stronghold, in the rear of Paljenik, together with Paljenik itself, Rujaničak, Prolon, Mehina Vodica, and elevation 529, then the village of Kesten, and finally advanced to the villages of Medići, Stog, Kamenica, and through Prokop to Pejanovići. Units of the 3rd Corps then managed to link up with the 2nd Corps (2. korpus), which had launched its own westward offensive operation, codenamed “Uragan-95”, thereby securing the Vozuća-Ozren sector and establishing a link between these two Corps.

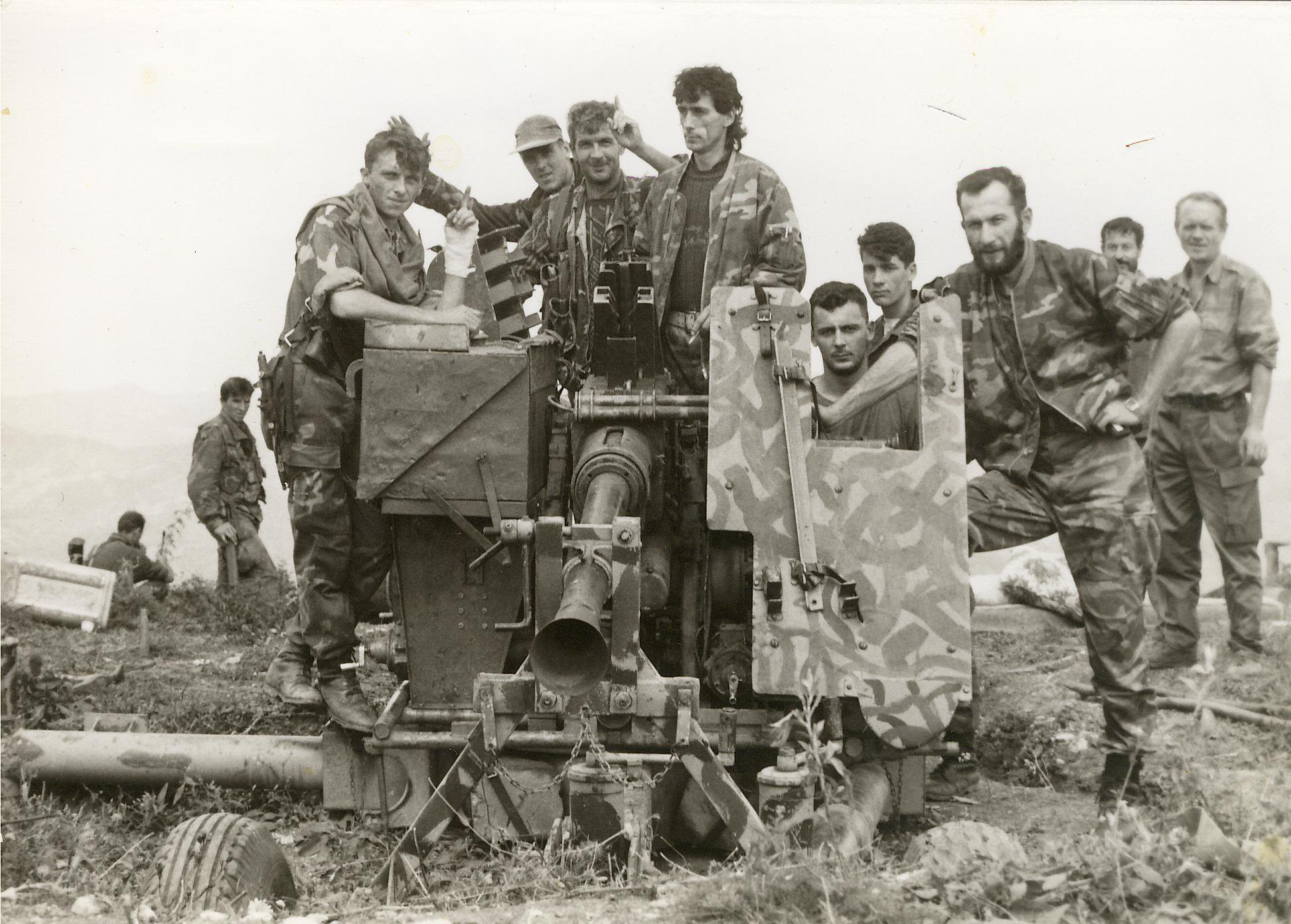
Members of the 7th Muslim Brigade with a captured VRS anti-air gun on the Vozuća battlefield, September 15th 1995

According to VRS sources, between September 10 and 11, 1995, 280 VRS fighters were killed or went missing in and around Vozuća, mainly from the 4th Ozren (4. Ozrenska laka pješadijska brigada) (126 soldiers), the 14th Serbian (14. Srpska laka pješadijska brigada) (78 soldiers), and the 1st Srbac Light Infantry Brigade (1. Srbačka laka pješadijska brigada) (40 soldiers), as well as among other units of the VRS and the Ministry of the Interior in the area of Vozuća.

Between October 5 and 7, 1995, soldiers of the 7th Muslim Knights Liberation Brigade, together with the 327th Maglaj Knights Mountain Brigade (327. Viteška brdska brigada), succeeded in capturing over 50 km^{2} of territory on Ozren, just four days before the nationwide ceasefire came into effect on October 11, 1995.

On December 10, 1995, the 7th Muslim Knight Liberation Brigade led the ceremonial review and parade of the 3rd Corps in Zenica.

== Structure and command ==
During the wartime period, the brigade was commanded by: Colonel Asim Koričić, Brigadier Amir Kubura, Brigadier Šerif Patković, and Brigadier General Halil Brzina.

During the war period, the battalion commanders of the 7th Muslim Brigade were as follows:
1st Battalion (Travnik) – Fadil Hadžić; Ahmed Zubača; Safet Junuzović; Enver Adilović
2nd Battalion (Zenica) – Šerif Patković; Kasim Podžić; Ferid Haseljić-Taško
3rd Battalion (Kakanj) – Kasim Alajbegović; Nihad Ćatić; Mustafa Hadžihafizbegović; Islam Topalović; Senad Buljina; Mirsad Stabančić

With the formation of the new, Zenica-based 3rd Battalion in 1994, Džemal Hercegovac was appointed as its commander.

The 4th Battalion, formed in April 1995, was commanded by Mirsad Derlić.

Toward the end of the war, the organisation of the 7th Muslim Knights Liberation Brigade was as follows:
1st Battalion – Kakanj/Kaćuni
2nd Battalion – Zenica
3rd Battalion – Zenica
4th Battalion – Zenica (Janjići)
Reconnaissance-Sabotage Company
Military Police Company

Towards the end of the war, the commanders and senior leadership of the 7th Muslim Knightly Liberation Brigade were as follows:
Commander – Brigadier General Halil Brzina
Assistant Commander for Morale – Sulejman Kurtanović
Assistant Commander for Logistics – Nusret Bolić
Assistant Commander for Security – Hajrudin Arnaut
Assistant Commander for Intelligence Affairs – Nihad Ćatić
Assistant Commander for Finance – Nijaz Duranović
Assistant Commander for Personnel – Nezir Mešković
Chief of Staff – Senad Mašović
Operations and Training Officer – Senad Buljina
Chief of Communications – Asif Kahriman
Chief of Artillery – Ibro Durmiš
Chief of Air Defense – Ragib Ćatić
Chief of Engineering – Ramiz Hukić

== See also ==
- Bosnian War
- Army of the Republic of Bosnia and Herzegovina
- 3rd Corps (Army of the Republic of Bosnia and Herzegovina)
- Battle of Vozuća
- Operation Vlašić
