= Lašva Valley counteroffensive =

- Part of the Bosnian War and Croat–Bosniak war
Date	April–July 1993
Location	Lašva Valley, central Bosnia and Herzegovina (Travnik, Novi Travnik, Kakanj, Zenica, Kiseljak, Kreševo)
Result	ARBiH victory
Territorial changes	ARBiH establishes control over the Lašva Valley and creates a contiguous corridor between Zenica and Travnik

Belligerents
Republic of Bosnia and Herzegovina	Croatian Republic of Herzeg-Bosnia

Commanders and leaders
Sefer Halilović; Rasim Delić; Enver Hadžihasanović; Mehmed Alagić	Tihomir Blaškić; Željko Sabljic; Vinko Barešić; Ilija Nakić; Jozo Leutar

Units involved
Army of the Republic of Bosnia and Herzegovina; 3rd Corps; 17th Krajina Brigade; 7th Muslim Brigade; 306th Mountain Brigade; 303rd Mountain Brigade; 314th Mountain Brigade; Bosnian police; Bosnian mujahideen	Croatian Defence Council; Military District Vitez; Travnik Brigade; "Frankopan" Brigade; "Stjepan Tomašević" Brigade

Casualties and losses
(unknown)	More than 2,000 killed, roughly 60,000 forcefully displaced.

The Lašva Valley counteroffensive (April–July 1993) was a series of ARBiH offensives in central Bosnia during the Bosnian War, most notably involving the capture of Travnik and subsequent advances toward Zenica and Kakanj. The counteroffensive marked a turning point in central Bosnia when Bosnian government forces regained the initiative after months of being cut off and fighting on multiple fronts.

== Background ==
In early June 1993, the Bosnian Army found itself surrounded, cut off from military supplies, and fighting both Bosnian Serb and Bosnian Croat forces simultaneously. This counteroffensive was launched largely in response to earlier attacks by the Croatian Defence Council (HVO) in April. From Sarajevo's standpoint, this was one of the darkest hours of the conflict. The situation began to shift when the Army's main staff was reorganized under a newly appointed commander, General Rasim Delić, who immediately overhauled the composition and strategy of ARBiH forces. Under his direction, the Bosnian Army began to strike back, employing newly formed and hardened brigades drawn from displaced Bosniak populations and motivated volunteers.

== Forces and local situation ==
The opening salvo of the counteroffensive targeted Travnik, located almost exactly in the geographic and demographic center of Bosnia and Herzegovina. With a prewar population of over 70,000 (approximately 45% Muslim, 37% Croat, 11% Serb), Travnik was the second-largest town in central Bosnia after Zenica. The town hosted the Pucarevo weapons plant and sat near Novi Travnik, a smaller town of some 30,000 residents. The Travnik–Zenica urban area had become the center of a more assertive Bosniak identity, influenced by refugees expelled from parts of western Bosnia and radicalized by atrocities experienced in 1992 and attacks in April–May 1993. From a military standpoint, this radicalization produced the 7th Muslim and 17th Krajina Brigade units that would become noted for their fierceness and effectiveness despite limited formal training.

All government forces in the area were part of the ARBiH 3rd Corps and its Bosanska Krajina Operational Group under Enver Hadžihasanović and Mehmed Alagić. Core units included the 17th Krajina Brigade (headquartered in Travnik under Fikret Ćuškić), the 306th Mountain Brigade (Han Bila), and potentially the 7th Muslim, 303rd, and 314th Brigades from Zenica, altogether roughly the equivalent of four full brigades for the offensive.

HVO forces in the area comprised most of the Vitez Military District's (ZP Vitez) First Operational Group. This included the Travnik-based brigades—"Travnika" led by Jozo Leutar and "Frankopan" under Ilija Nakić—as well as the "Stjepan Tomašević" Brigade commanded by Željko Sabljić (which maintained a battalion in Novi Travnik). While the HVO maintained several units in the wider area (including Vitez and remnants of the Jure Francetić Brigade), its available forces to defend Travnik were effectively limited to two brigades

Serb forces occupied dominant terrain north of Travnik (notably Mt. Vlašić) and largely observed the Croat–Muslim conflict, occasionally shelling but generally not becoming heavily involved beyond exploiting the situation.

== Counteroffensive ==
=== Zenica ===
In mid of April 1993, tensions between ARBiH and HVO in Zenica reached a breaking point. After several kidnappings, including four HVO soldiers from Novi Travnik and the ambush of HVO commander Živko Totić and his bodyguard on April 15, local HVO units increased their readiness but did not expect a full-scale attack. In the early hours of April 17, ARBiH forces launched a coordinated assault from multiple directions, encircling and disarming the Jure Francetić and 2nd Zenica Brigade. Many Croat men were taken to detention centers in Zenica, while others escaped toward HVO lines near Novi Bila. Over the following days, Croat villages such as Čajdraš, Vjetrenice, Janjać, Kozarci, Osojnica, Stranjani, Zahalie, and Dobriljeno were systematically attacked and “cleansed,” forcing most of the Croat population to flee their homes. Lieutenant Colonel Stewart noted: "things got worse overnight; Zenica blown up with violence and Muslims having a go at Croats who live in/around Zenica; lots of Croat refugees in Croat-held area at Cajdras; 800 civilians ethnically cleansed from Podbrezje West of Zenica by Muslims". According to reports by the European Community Monitoring Mission, hundreds of Croats were detained in facilities including the Zenica Prison, Bilimišće, Nemila, and the “Music School,” while extensive destruction of Croat property was recorded despite official assurances they could return. The fall of the HVO brigades in Zenica marked a devastating blow to the Croat community in central Bosnia.

=== Travnik ===
On 4 June 1993, the ARBiH launched a major assault on Travnik, supported by artillery and direct-fire anti-aircraft guns. From 5 to 13th June, ARBiH had successfully cleared HVO forces from Travnik and surrounding villages, despite continued shelling from Croat-held positions. ARBiH also captured the village of Ovčarevo, securing control of key approaches to the town.

By 8–9 June, the ARBiH advanced further, seizing the strategic road junction at Turbe and establishing a secure corridor linking Travnik to Zenica (about 20 km). This achievement was both a significant operational success and a major morale boost. A barely perceptible lull occurred 8 June when the Bosnian Army's new commander in chief, Gen. Rasim Delic , called for a halt in the fighting and accepted a Croat-Bosniak ceasefire agreement effective for the whole country. Having gained the initiative, however the Bosnian Army pressed its advantage as far as it could in all directions and on 8 and 9 June continued its offensive to the southeast . attacking the nearby village of Senkovci and pushing the remaining HVO forces south and east toward Croat held Novi Travnik and Vitez.

United Nations sources reported that as of June 10, 500 Croats had been killed, thirty-eight villages had been burned, and some 30,000 displaced persons were in the Novi Bila-Vitez- Busovaca-Novi Travnik area. Overall, in June, July, and August, some 427 HVO soldiers and 157 Croat civilians were killed, 1,000 were wounded, 20,000 Croat civilians were displaced, fifteen hundred Croat homes and thirty-one hundred other buildings were burned, and about fifty Croat villages between Travnik and Zenica were destroyed, including Grahovcici, Donja Maljina, Guca Gora, Bikosi, Sadici, Gornja Puticevo, Rudnik, Bila, and Cupa.

=== Novi Travnik ===
On 9 June 1993, the ARBiH launched a strong offensive in Novi Travnik at 5:15 AM quickly gaining control over most of the town and its municipality. It involved the 308th, 307th, and 317th Mountain Brigades, elements of the 7th Muslim Motorized Brigade, MUP units, and volunteer mujahideen. The ARBiH captured key fortifications and Croat villages including Ruda, Jakovici, Nokovici, Pecina, and Kovacici, causing the Croat population to flee. HVO forces were surrounded, and 6–8,000 civilians fled the area. The HVO regrouped, but were surrounded in Novi Travnik, as ARBiH forces then controlled 90 per cent of the municipality. A high-rise building, Stari Soliter, became the scene of intense fighting, with 57 people (18 women, 18 children) trapped. Through ARBiH arrangements, the residents were safely evacuated in September in exchange for Croat civilians from two captured villages by ARBiH.

=== Kakanj ===
On 16 June, the ARBiH captured Kakanj after successful operations against surrounding villages starting on 9 June. HVO forces were unable to hold their positions, and thousands of Bosnian Croat civilians fled east toward Vareš. The ARBiH effectively neutralized HVO defensive lines at Kraljevska Sutjeska and other key points, consolidating control over central Bosnia and inflicting heavy territorial and manpower losses on their opponents.

== Aftermath ==
During 1993 the portion of Bosnian territory under HVO control fell by half, from about 20% to 10%. The ARBiH's victorious campaign was accompanied by large-scale atrocities against Croat civilians in Central Bosnia. The HZ H-B leadership claimed in August 1993 that since April of the same year the ARBiH had expelled the entire Croat population from the cities of Konjic, Jablanica, Travnik, Kakanj, Fojnica and Bugojno; destroyed 187 Croat villages; and imprisoned about 4,500 Croats in concentration camps.

== See also ==
- Bosnian War
- Battle of Travnik
- ARBiH 3rd Corps
