= Battle of Travnik (1993) =

1993 military action

- Part of the Croat–Bosniak War and the Lašva Valley counteroffensive
Date	5 April – 14 June 1993 (cease-fire signed on 29 April 1993)
Location	Travnik, Bosnia and Herzegovina
Result	ARBiH victory
Territorial changes	ARBiH captures Travnik on 9 June 1993

Belligerents
Croatian Republic of Herzeg-Bosnia	Republic of Bosnia and Herzegovina

Commanders and leaders
Tihomir Blaškić	Sefer Halilović; Enver Hadžihasanović; Mehmed Alagić; Rasim Delic (from 10 June)

Units involved
HVO; Military District Vitez; Travnik Brigade	ARBiH; 3rd Corps; 7th Muslim Brigade

Casualties and losses
572 soldiers killed 114 civilians killed 1,739 POWs	Unknown
- 32 Croat villages burned, ~100–200 Civilian casualties

The Battle of Travnik (Bosnian and Croatian: Bitka za Travnik) was a battle between the Croatian Defence Council (HVO) and the Army of the Republic of Bosnia and Herzegovina (ARBiH).

== Background ==
On 18 November 1990, the first multi-party parliamentary elections were held in Bosnia and Herzegovina, with a second round on 25 November. They resulted in a national assembly dominated by three ethnically based parties, which had formed a loose coalition to oust the communists from power. A significant split soon developed on the issue of whether to stay with the Yugoslav federation (overwhelmingly favoured among Serbs) or to seek independence (overwhelmingly favoured among Bosniaks and Croats).

The Serbs established the RAM Plan, developed by the State Security Administration (SDB or SDS) and a group of selected Serb officers of the Yugoslav People's Army (JNA) with the purpose of organizing Serbs outside Serbia, consolidating control of the fledgling SDP, and the prepositioning of arms and ammunition.

Alarmed, the government of Bosnia and Herzegovina declared independence from Yugoslavia on 15 October 1991, shortly followed by the establishment of the Serbian National Assembly by Bosnian Serbs.

War broke out between Herzeg-Bosnia, supported by Croatia, and the Republic of Bosnia and Herzegovina, supported by the Bosnian Mujahideen and the Croatian Defence Forces. It lasted from 18 October 1992 to 23 February 1994, and is considered often as a "war within a war" as it was a part of the much larger Bosnian War. Fighting soon spread to Central Bosnia and soon Herzegovina, where most of the fighting would take place in those regions.

Between 1992 and 1993, many massacres and killings would take place, such as the Lašva Valley ethnic cleansing, Trusina massacre, Ahmići massacre, Sovići and Doljani killings, Vitez massacre, Mokronoge massacre, Grabovica massacre, Uzdol massacre, Stupni Do massacre, Križančevo selo killings, and Zenica massacre. Battles, operations, and sieges were also common during that time period, as the battle of Žepče, Bugojno, Siege of Mostar, and Operation Neretva '93.

== Battle ==
The ARBiH transported soldiers to the Travnik region by buses in a way that they would not be spotted by the HVO. When they were spotted, the ARBiH claimed that they were replacement forces, but it was noticed that the buses were leaving empty. They hid the units in Muslim villages or in small groups in houses in Croatian villages. In April, the number reached eight to ten thousand people. They were commanded by Mehmed Alagić, then Rasim Delic took charge on June 10, 1993, still, the units under their respective commanders were called the Bosnian Region Operative Group of the Third Corps of the ARBiH, later renamed the 7th Corps. At the beginning of April, the Muslims brought in more forces.

By this time, the Croatian forces were stretched on the lines towards the Serbs, holding two-thirds of the front line, although they were many times less than the Muslims. The ARBiH controlled Travnik, and the HVO had its headquarters and several other locations in Travnik. On June 6, the commander of the 3rd ARBiH Corps, Enver Hadžihasanović, told the UNPROFOR commander that civil war and military action were their only solution. The attack followed on the same day. The HVO was numerically superior, and Hadžihasanović could not engage in house-to-house defensive battles. There was no possibility of bringing in reinforcements, help or supplies. The fighting lasted for several days. The command post of the HVO, Zvijezda in Travnik, was surrounded by the ARBiH. The other brigades attacked towards Guča Gora, Pokrajčići and in the rear of the HVO, which was holding positions towards the Serbs. A fierce attack was carried on June 8 south of Travnik, in which 24 HVO soldiers and 68 Croatian civilians died. The HVO either surrendered or was pushed across the demarcation line with the Serbs. Those who broke through the Serbian lines were followed by a column of Croatian civilians.

== Serbian role ==
In the area of Galica on Vlašić, Serbian forces committed war crimes against captured HVO soldiers on May 15, 1992. There was later a point where Serbian weapons and ammunition were supplied to the ARBiH for petrodollars.

== See also ==
- Battle of Bugojno
- Lašva Valley Counteroffensive
