= Zenica Music School =

Wartime detention facility in Zenica

- Internment camp
- Location within Bosnia and Herzegovina
- Coordinates: 44°12′11″N 17°54′18″E
- Other names: Srednja muzička škola Zenica
- Location: Central Zenica city, Bosnia and Herzegovina
- Operated by: The 7th Muslim Brigade
- Operational: 26 January–20 August or 20 September 1993
- Inmates: Bosnian Serbs and Bosnian Croats
- Number of inmates: More than 100

The Zenica Music School Bosnian: Muzička škola Zenici refers to a music school in the city of Zenica, Bosnia and Herzegovina, that was used as an internment camp during the Bosnian War. Operated by the 7th Muslim Brigade of the Army of the Republic of Bosnia and Herzegovina, it held Serb and Croat civilians and prisoners of war, who were subjected to mistreatment and abuse. The legal prosecution of Enver Hadzihasanović partly in relation to the school resulted in a sentence of five years in prison for war crimes, though it was later reduced.

== History ==
=== Background ===
Founded on May 17, 1977, the Zenica Music School is a public secondary music school. It is located at Školska 11b next to an elementary music school.

=== Bosnian War ===
During the Bosnian War, the Army of the Republic of Bosnia and Herzegovina (ARBiH) converted the school into an unofficial internment camp for Serb and Croat civilians and prisoners of war. It operated between January 26, 1993, and August 20 (or September 20, 1993). Serbs and Croats from Zenica and its surroundings were captured and brought to the facility, where 7th Muslim Brigade soldiers acted as guards.

==== Numbers ====
Verdicts revealed that in January 1993, around ten people were detained in the school's basement, while in the second half of April to August, around 15 to 46 prisoners were reported. Over its course of operation, more than 100 ethnic Croats and Serb prisoners were held at the school. Nasid Delalic, a 7th Muslim Brigade policeman and school guard, claimed that about nine Croatian Defence Council (HVO) soldiers were brought to the school, while other reports allege lower numbers.

== Conditions during the Bosnian War ==
Despite disputes from members of the 7th Muslim Brigade, during the Bosnian War, severe mistreatment and abuse were reported in the school, including beatings with wooden poles and rubber cables and kicks, and according to testimonies against commanders Enver Hadzihasanovic and Amir Kubura in The Hague, soldiers and policemen played music loudly to suppress the cries of prisoners getting beaten. Prisoners regularly showed symptoms of physical trauma, being covered in blood and bruises. Rather than toilets, prisoners excreted in plastic buckets. They were also interrogated using physical assault. The Sarajevo Times described the facility's conditions as "unhygienic conditions and without enough food and water" for prisoners.

During the ICTY proceedings in 2005, then-head of the Zenica municipal government, Ramiz Dzaferovic, disputed the abuse of detainees as "terrible propaganda." He argued that because the school was publicly available during the period, no unlawful activity occurred on its premises. However, it was documented that the International Red Cross was banned from entering the school.

== Prosecution ==
=== Enver Hadzihasanović ===
Enver Hadzihasanović was found guilty under the United Nations International Criminal Tribunal for the former Yugoslavia (ICTY) for war crimes, including failing to prevent abuse at the Zenica Music School. He was initially sentenced to five years in prison. However, on appeal, his sentence was reduced to three and a half years.

=== Nesib Talić, Jusuf Karalić, Našid Delalić and Sabahudin Sarajlić ===
Indictments against Nesib Talić, Jusuf Karalić, Našid Delalić and Sabahudin Sarajlić resulted in a proposed prohibition in January 2026, though the court of Bosnia is to decide the measures at a later date. The trial against the individuals began in March 2026. Talić was accused of failing to prevent illegal detentions and inhumane treatment of civilians, while Karalić was accused of commanding perpetrators, "that he had an obligation to prevent their illegal actions." Delalić and Sarajlić were accused of directly abusing civilians, serving four and two counts of abuse, respectively.
