= 3rd Corps (Army of the Republic of Bosnia and Herzegovina) =

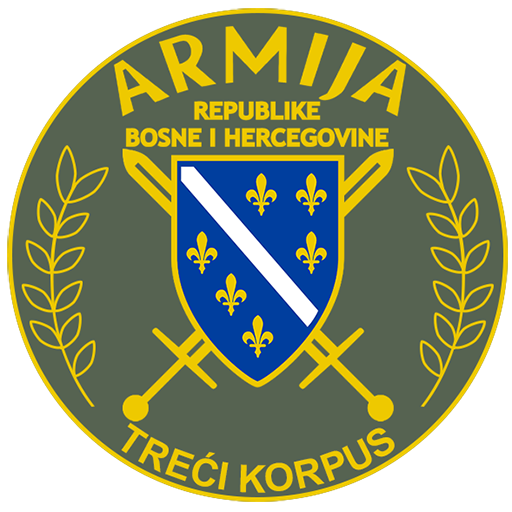
- 3rd Corps Patch
- Active: 1 December 1992 – 1995
- Country: Republic of Bosnia and Herzegovina
- Allegiance: Army of the Republic of Bosnia and Herzegovina
- Branch: Army
- Type: Army Corps
- Role: Land warfare
- Size: 34,500–40,500
- Garrison/HQ: Zenica
- Colors: Green and yellow
- Engagements: Bosnian War; Croat–Bosniak War; Battle of Gornji Vakuf; Battle of Bugojno; Siege of Stari Vitez; Battle of Vareš; Lašva Valley counteroffensive; Operation Neretva '93

Commanders
- Notable commanders: Enver Hadžihasanović; Mehmed Alagić; Kadir Jusić; Sakib Mahmuljin

The 3rd Corps of the Army of the Republic of Bosnia and Herzegovina was one of five (later 7) corps that comprised the Army of the Republic of Bosnia and Herzegovina. It was established by the order of the Commander of Main Staff of the Bosnian Army Sefer Halilović on 9 November 1992 under Alija Izetbegović. This Corps was formed to unite the rest of the Territorial Defence Force of the Republic of Bosnia and Hercegovina and some Bosnian Special Forces and Civilian Forces.

== Operational Zone ==
The operational zone for the 3rd Corps were the districts of: Banja Luka, Bosanska Dubica, Bosanska Gradiška, Breza, Bugojno, Busovača, Čelinac, Donji Vakuf, Gornji Vakuf, Jajce, Kakanj, Kotor Varoš, Kupres, Laktaši, Mrkonjić Grad, Novi Travnik, Prnjavor, Skender Vakuf, Srbac, Šipovo, Travnik, Vitez, Zavidovići, Zenica and Žepče. Because of the fighting, there was a quick change in the territory and Vareš was included.

== Command ==
The Headquarters of the 3rd Corps was located in Zenica and comprised several specialized centers:

- Center for Operational Command: Managed tactical intelligence, including information concerning civilians and the MUP (Ministry of the Interior), ensuring critical intelligence was reported directly to the 3rd Corps command.
- Center for Relations: Responsible for the planning and coordination of all communications and external relations involving the 3rd Corps command.
- Military Intelligence Service: A specialized service for counter-intelligence, military police operations, and the security of command headquarters and other protected facilities. The service was commanded by Ramiz Dugalić.

=== Commanders ===
- Enver Hadžihasanović, 1st (Dec 1992–Nov 1993)
- Mehmed Alagić, 2nd (Nov 1993–Jan 1994)
- Kadir Jusić, 3rd (Jan 1994–Sep 1994)
- Sakib Mahmuljin, 4th (Sep 1994–end of war)

== Operational Groups ==
In February 1993, four operational groups were created under the command of Enver Hadžihasanović, the goal was to connect the 3rd Corps forces on the battlefield and the 3rd Corps Command:

- Operational group Bosanska Krajina headquarters in Travnik, Commander at the time Mehmed Alagić
- Operational group Lašva in Kakanj,
- Operational group Bosna in Žepče or Zavidovići,
- Operational group Zapad in Bugojno, Commander Selmo Cikotić
- Operational group Visoko in Visoko, later renamed Operational group Istok. This belonged to the 1st Corps, then 6th Corps.

== 3rd Corps Units ==
- Operational Command of the 3rd Corps
  - Military Police Brigade
  - 301st Brigade
  - 303rd Mountain Brigade
  - 304th Mountain Brigade Breza
  - 314th Mountain Brigade
  - 328th Mountain Brigade Zavidovici
- Operational Group Bosanska Krajina
  - 7th Muslim Brigade
  - 17th Brigade
  - 306th Brigade, once belonged to Operational group West
  - 325th Brigade
- Operational Group Lašva
  - 309th Brigade
  - 325th Brigade
  - 333rd Brigade
- Operational Group Bosna
  - 318th Brigade
  - 319th Brigade
- Operational Group West
  - 307th Brigade
  - 308th Brigade
  - 312th Brigade
  - 317th Brigade

== War crimes charges ==
The command of the 3rd Corps was subject to extensive investigations by the International Criminal Tribunal for the former Yugoslavia (ICTY) in the case (IT-01-47) Hadžihasanović & Kubura. The trial focused on the principle of "superior criminal responsibility" (Article 7(3) of the Statute) for crimes committed in central Bosnia and Herzegovina in 1993 and early 1994.

The legal history of the 3rd Corps was extensively documented through ICTY proceedings, where Enver Hadžihasanović was convicted of failing to take necessary and reasonable measures to prevent or punish the cruel treatment of detainees at the Zenica Music School and the Slavonija Furniture Salon in Bugojno, receiving an initial sentence of five years' imprisonment, which was later reduced to three and a half years on appeal. Similarly, Amir Kubura was convicted of failing to prevent or punish plunder committed by his subordinates in the Vareš area and was sentenced to two and a half years' imprisonment, later reduced to two years. Additionally, while Mehmed Alagić was charged with similar counts of superior responsibility, the legal proceedings against him were terminated following his death in March 2003.

Regarding foreign combatants, the Trial Chamber made significant findings concerning the relationship between the 3rd Corps and the "El Mujahed" detachment, noting that while a close de facto relationship and joint combat operations existed prior to August 1993, the 3rd Corps did not exercise "effective control" over the foreign Mujahedin during that period. However, following the de jure integration and formal establishment of the "El Mujahed" detachment on 13 August 1993, the unit was officially incorporated into the 3rd Corps, leading the Chamber to conclude that Enver Hadžihasanović subsequently exercised effective control over the detachment.
