= Franciscan friary, Guča Gora =

Franciscan monastery in Guča Gorca, Bosnia

Coordinates: 44°14′39″N 17°43′33″E

Guča Gora
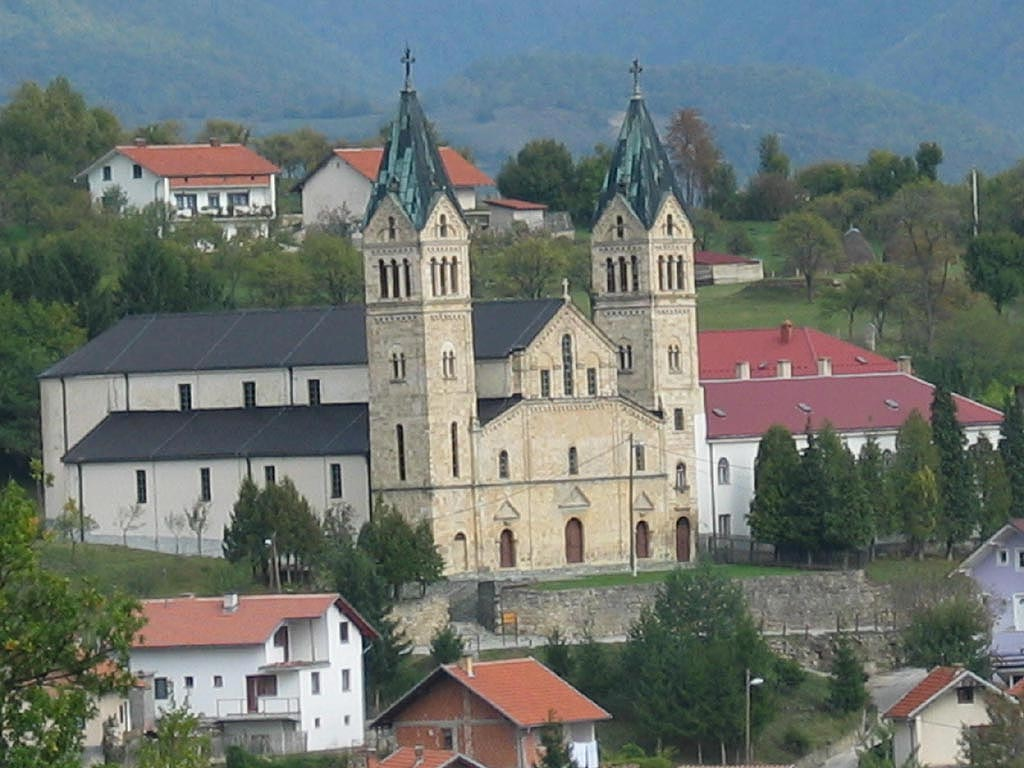
- Interactive map of Guča Gora

Monastery information
- Order: Franciscan
- Established: 1859
- Dedication: St. Francis of Assisi
- Diocese: Roman Catholic Archdiocese of Vrhbosna

Site
- Location: Guča Gora; Bosnia and Herzegovina

The Guča Gora Monastery is a Roman Catholic Franciscan monastery in a small village Guča Gora east of Travnik in Bosnia and Herzegovina. In the mid-19th century Bosnian Franciscans decided to build the monastery in the area of Travnik. On May 30, 1859, the General Minister of the Franciscan Order issued the decree establishing the Guča Gora Monastery.

The monastery was damaged and vandalised by Bosnian mujahideen fighters during the Bosnian War in June 1993.

== See also ==
- Franciscan Province of Bosna Srebrena
