= Battle of Novi Travnik (1992) =

Bosnian War battle

- Part of the Croat–Bosniak War and Bosnian War
Date	19 – 23 October 1992
Location	Novi Travnik, Bosnia and Herzegovina
Result	HVO victory
Territorial changes	HVO takes full control of the city of Novi Travnik

Belligerents
Croatian Republic of Herzeg-Bosnia	Republic of Bosnia and Herzegovina

Commanders and leaders
(Croatian Republic of Herzeg-Bosnia) Tihomir Blaškić	Mehmed Alagić

Units involved
Travnik Brigade HVO	3rd Corps

Casualties and losses
Unknown	Unknown

The Battle of Novi Travnik (Croatian: Bitka za Novi Travnik) was a battle between the Croatian Defence Council (HVO) and the Army of the Republic of Bosnia and Herzegovina (ARBiH) that occurred between 19–26 October 1992. The conflict between Croatian Defence Council (HVO) and Bosnian Army (ARBiH) broke out again in Novi Travnik when the HVO attacked a Bosnian Army unit in the fire brigade building. It is assumed that the cause of the conflict was a demand by the HVO to be allowed to take over the Bratstvo ammunition factory which the Bosnian Army refused. Both sides wanted to control Novi Travnik, but in the end the HVO occupied the entire city and the Muslim civilians and ARBiH soldiers were forced to leave the city.

== Background ==
While the fighting with Serbs was going on. Croats and Muslims increasingly separated. Croats from Bosnia had an interest in Herceg-Bosna joining Croatia, and Alija was strictly against that idea. Before the battle in Novi Travnik, there were small incidents between the HVO and the ARBiH. In the city of Novi Travnik in 1991 Serbs made up the majority with 3,200 (27.77%), followed by Bosniaks with 3,176 (27.56%) and then Croatians with 2,751 (23.87%). When the Bosnian war started, all the Serbs left Novi Travnik. So the city was divided between Muslims and Croats. When the Croatian-Bosnian war began, the HVO occupied the city and the Bosniaks left the city. Croats became the majority, and that effect can be seen in 2013, with 4,815 (53.45%) Croats and 3,624 (40.23%) Bosniaks.

== Battle ==
The level of Croat-Muslim violence escalated significantly in late October 1992. Outright fighting between the nominal allies appears to have begun first in Novi Travnik on 19 October and then in Vitez the following day. A truce was arranged in Vitez on 22 October, but Croat forces continued to shell Novi Travnik from the hills outside the town, causing serious damage.

Gunshots were heard in the streets, snipers fired from buildings, and there were many ambushes in the city. ARBiH soldiers slowly lost control over parts of the city. And the HVO occupied the streets and tactically they were better. The HVO occupied the police station and managed to secure the entire city under its control. UNPROFOR finally arranged a ceasefire for Novi Travnik on October 23. When the battle was over, many Bosniaks who remained in the city were evacuated during the ceasefire. And the remaining ARBiH soldiers left the city.
