= Operation Tekbir '95 =

Military operation of the Bosnian War

- Part of the Siege of Sarajevo during the Bosnian War
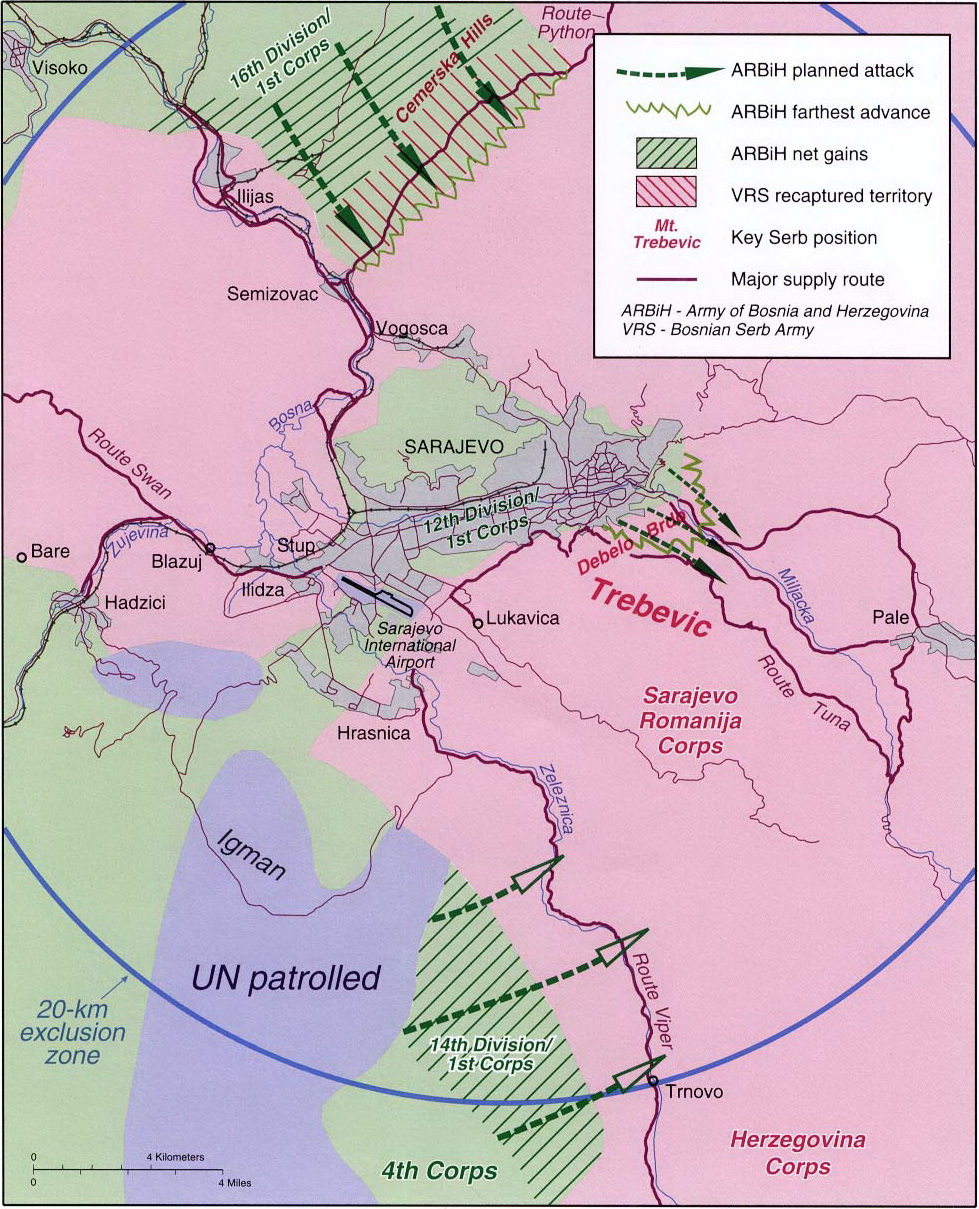
- ARBiH Offensive Operations in the Sarajevo Region, 15–22 June 1995
Date	15–28 June 1995
Location	Sarajevo and surroundings, Republic of Bosnia and Herzegovina
Result	Army of Republika Srpska victory: The VRS repels the ARBiH offensive in Sarajevo; No major territorial changes

Belligerents
Republika Srpska	Republic of Bosnia and Herzegovina

Commanders and leaders
Ratko Mladić	Rasim Delić

Units involved
Sarajevo-Romanija Corps; Herzegovina Corps	1st Corps; 3rd Corps (partly); 4th Corps (partly); 7th Corps (partly)

Casualties and losses
200 killed and 600 wounded	1,000 killed and 3,000 wounded

The Bosnian offensive on Sarajevo in 1995 (codenamed Operation Tekbir '95) was a military offensive executed by Bosnian forces (ARBiH) against Serb forces (VRS) in an attempt to break the Siege of Sarajevo during the Bosnian War. The Bosnian forces were superior in manpower, but not in heavy weapons, which were key items for trench warfare. This lack of weapons eventually led commander Rasim Delić to stop the offensive due to heavy losses.

== Start of the offensive ==
As fighting in Sarajevo gradually widened in 1995, Bosnian forces launched a large-scale offensive in the area. In response to the attack, the Bosnian Serbs seized heavy weapons from UN-guarded depots and began shelling their targets. As a response to these actions, the UN commander, Lt. General Rupert Smith, requested NATO air strikes. NATO honored the request on 25 May and on 26 May 1995 and bombed a Serb ammunition dump near Pale. The mission was carried out by USAF F-16s and Spanish Air Force EF-18A Hornets armed with laser-guided bombs. During this attack, the Serbs then took 377 UNPROFOR members as hostages. They used them as human shields for a variety of targets in Pale, forcing NATO to end its strikes.

== Course of the Offensive ==
The Bosnian forces initially had many successes: the 1st Corps attacked and captured Debelo Brdo, Cemerska and Route Viper, pushing the Serbs back. However, in a counterattack led by Colonel general Ratko Mladić the Serbs managed to recapture most of the land, including Cemerska, Trnovo and Stup. The ARBiH attacks were stopped because of the huge losses: over 1,000 men killed and over 3,000 wounded.
