= Siege of Stari Vitez =

- Part of Croat-Bosniak War and Bosnian War
Date	16 April 1993 – 25 February 1994
Location	Stari Vitez, Vitez, Bosnia and Herzegovina
Result	Ceasefire: ARBiH keeps control of Stari Vitez

Belligerents
Republic of Bosnia and Herzegovina	Croatian Republic of Herzeg-Bosnia

Commanders and leaders
unknown	Tihomir Blaškić; Zlatko Nakić †

Units involved
ARBiH: 325th Brigade	HVO

Strength
several hundred of soldiers	Over 1,000

Casualties and losses
unknown	unknown
- Many Bosniak civilians killed or injured HVO lost 15 men in clashes (executed) / (POW)

The Siege of Stari Vitez was a siege during the Croat-Bosniak War where the Croatian Defence Council (HVO) besieged the Army of the Republic of Bosnia and Herzegovina (ARBiH) in the Stari Vitez Area. The siege started on 16 April 1993 and ended on 25 February 1994.

== Background ==
In early April 1992, following the referendum in Bosnia, the Bosnian War started. The Army of the Republic of Bosnia and Herzegovina (ARBiH) and Croatian Defence Council (HVO) fought together against the Army of Republika Srpska (VRS) though tensions were rising as the Bosnian Croats under Mate Boban sought independence from Bosnia. In early October 1992 the Croat-Bosniak War started. On 20 October 1992 the HVO attacked the Barricades near Ahmići. Homes were burned and a mosque was shelled. The attack lasted the whole morning until the ARBiH soldiers ran out of ammunition and they later removed the checkpoint. The HVO took control of the police stations in Vitez and with that, fighting began. The ARBiH slowly began losing control of the town and by 22 October, when the Ceasefire in Vitez was implemented, the HVO had almost full control of the town except for Stari Vitez.

== The Siege ==
the HVO had laid siege on the Bosniak-majority area of Stari Vitez on 16 April 1993 where around 1,300 Bosniaks lived in the small, kilometer wide enclave. On Friday, 16 April 1993 the first skirmishes began in Stari Vitez at 5:30am. On 18 April the HVO sent a tanker with 500 Kilograms of explosives to Stari Vitez. The explosion happened near a mosque destroying the war office, killing six and injuring fifty Muslims.

The next three months were more peaceful as fighting subdued. On 18 July the HVO stopped its offensive on Stari Vitez. During that time, over 300 shells were dropped on the area and the HVO lost 15 men including their commander Zlatko Nakić. The HVO threatened the ARBiH that they would destroy Stari Vitez as a response to the Uzdol massacre. They were given time to retreat from the area, but they did not and the area was heavily shelled.

On 28 and 29 January 1994, the HVO attempted to assault Stari Vitez from the factory "SPS" but failed. They still shelled the ARBiH from 23 to 25 February 1994 and during that time they told the 325th Brigade to surrender but they refused. The ceasefire was implemented on 25 February 1994 and with that, the Siege of Stari Vitez ended.
