= Battle of Vitez (1992) =

- Part of the Croat–Bosniak War and Bosnian War
Date	20–22 October 1992
Location	Vitez, Ahmići
Result	Croatian Defence Council victory: Croats removed the barricade in Ahmići; HVO took control of police station and some other important parts of Vitez

Belligerents
Croatian Republic of Herzeg-Bosnia	Republic of Bosnia and Herzegovina

Units involved
Croatian Defence Council	Army of the Republic of Bosnia and Herzegovina

Casualties and losses
Unknown	Unknown

The Battle of Vitez (Croatian: Bitka za Vitez) was a battle between the Croatian Defence Council (HVO) and the Army of the Republic of Bosnia and Herzegovina (ARBiH) that occurred on 20–22 October 1992 during the Bosnian War.

== Background ==
On 19 October 1992, during the early part of the conflict in Novi Travnik, the local TO, on orders from their superiors, put up a barricade in Ahmići in the Vitez municipality on the main road through the Lašva Valley in order to prevent HVO reinforcements reaching Novi Travnik. The HVO warned the ARBiH from Vitez to withdraw and remove the barricades, but the ARBiH of course refused. And on October 20, the battle for Vitez and the surrounding villages begins.

== Battle ==
October 20 in the morning the HVO attacked the Ahmići barricade. The houses were set on fire, the minaret of the mosque was hit. The attack lasted all morning until the ARBiH soldiers manning the barricade ran out of ammunition and the checkpoint was then removed. The HVO took over Vitez police station and expelled the Bosnian Muslim police officers. Next day there were fights in the city with ARBiH slowly losing control of the city. Then on 22 October a general cease-fire for the Vitez municipality was signed. Croats took almost full control of the city. Muslim civilians and ARBiH soldiers left the city.
