= Čukle =

- Village
- Location within Bosnia and Herzegovina
- Coordinates: 44.2573919°N 17.7644131°E
- Country: Bosnia and Herzegovina
- Entity: Federation of Bosnia and Herzegovina
- Canton: Central Bosnia
- Municipality: Travnik

Area
  - Total: 5.29 sq mi (13.70 km^{2})

Population (2013)
  - Total: 524
  - Density: 99.1/sq mi (38.2/km^{2})
- Time zone: UTC+1 (CET)
  - Summer (DST): UTC+2 (CEST)

Čukle is a village in the municipality of Travnik, Bosnia and Herzegovina.

== Demographics ==
According to the 2013 census, its population was 524.

Ethnicity in 2013
Ethnicity	Number	Percentage
Bosniaks	404	77.1%
Croats	106	20.2%
other/undeclared	14	2.7%
Total	524	100%
