= Šerići =

- Village
- Location within Bosnia and Herzegovina
- Coordinates: 44.4659725°N 18.5312318°E
- Country: Bosnia and Herzegovina
- Entity: Federation of Bosnia and Herzegovina
- Canton: Tuzla
- Municipality: Živinice

Area
  - Total: 5.40 sq mi (13.98 km^{2})

Population (2013)
  - Total: 2,818
  - Density: 522.1/sq mi (201.6/km^{2})
- Time zone: UTC+1 (CET)
  - Summer (DST): UTC+2 (CEST)

Šerići is a village in Zenica. The biggest school is OŠ Šerići and the "local" mosque is the Šerićka džamija. This village is mostly muslim, and the biggest grocery store is SANI near the pekara. It is in the municipality of Živinice, Bosnia and Herzegovina. It is located southeast of Lake Modrac.

== Demographics ==
According to the 2013 census, its population was 2,818.

Ethnicity in 2013
Ethnicity	Number	Percentage
Bosniaks	2,763	98.0%
Croats	2	1.0%
Serbs	3	1.0%
other/undeclared	50	1.8%
Total	2,818	100%
