= Podbriježje =

- Village
- Location within Bosnia and Herzegovina
- Coordinates: 44.773452°N 16.632202°E
- Country: Bosnia and Herzegovina
- Entity: Federation of Bosnia and Herzegovina
- Canton: Una-Sana
- Municipality: Sanski Most

Area
  - Total: 0.51 sq mi (1.31 km^{2})

Population (2013)
  - Total: 529
  - Density: 1,050/sq mi (404/km^{2})
- Time zone: UTC+1 (CET)
  - Summer (DST): UTC+2 (CEST)

Podbriježje is a village in the municipality of Sanski Most, Federation of Bosnia and Herzegovina, Bosnia and Herzegovina.

== Demographics ==
According to the 2013 census, the population was 529.

Ethnicity in 2013
Ethnicity	Number	Percentage
Bosniaks	526	99.4%
other/undeclared	3	0.6%
Total	529	100%
