= Assault on Vlašić (1995) =

Military engagement of the Bosnian War

- Part of the Bosnian War
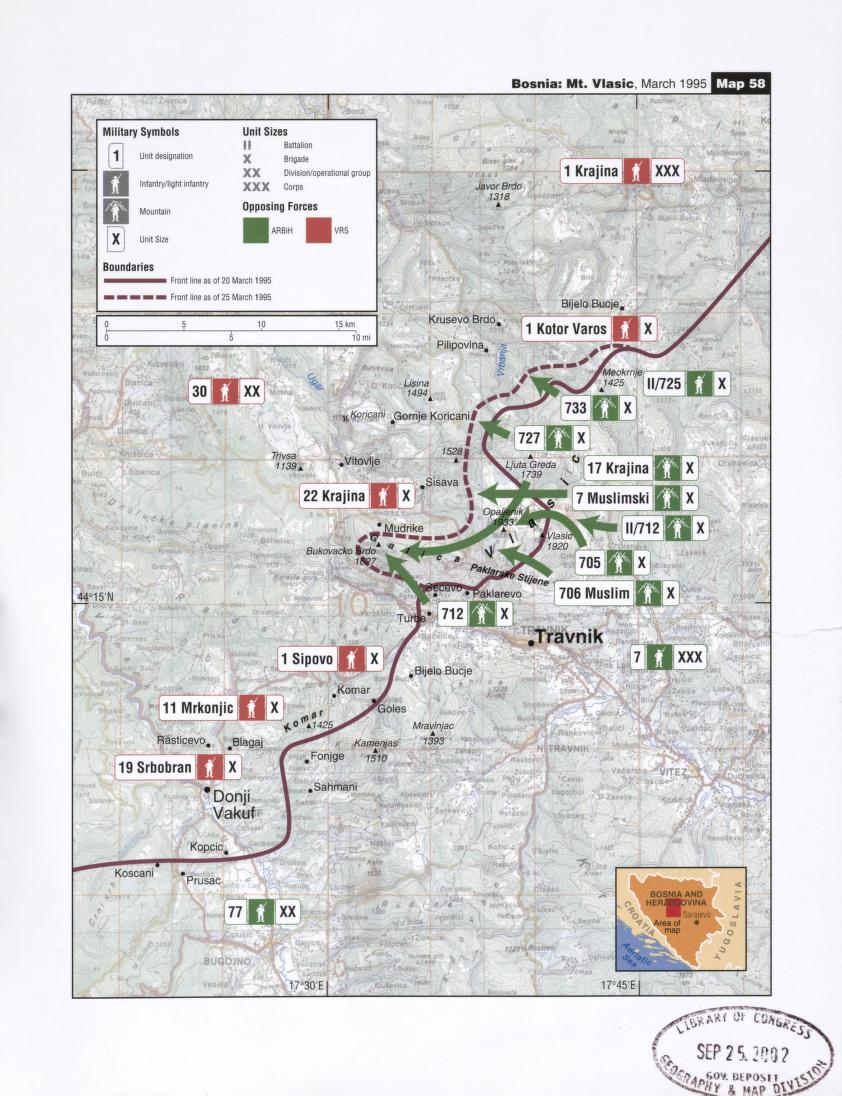
Date	20–24 March 1995
Location	Vlašić, Bosnia and Herzegovina
Result	ARBiH victory: Bosnian Forces capture Vlašić

Belligerents
Bosnia and Herzegovina	Republika Srpska

Commanders and leaders
Mehmed Alagić	Janko Trivić; Ratko Mladić

Units involved
Army of the Republic of Bosnia and Herzegovina	Army of Republika Srpska

Strength
24,480 soldiers	~5,000 soldiers

Casualties and losses
70 soldiers killed, 390 soldiers wounded	~200 soldiers killed, 530 soldiers wounded

Assault on Vlašić was a military offensive undertaken by the Army of the Republic of Bosnia and Herzegovina (ARBiH) during the Bosnian War, during which it captured Mount Vlašić in central Bosnia, which had been under the control of the Army of Republika Srpska (VRS) until then. The battle took place from March 20 to 24, 1995. The commander of the forces of the Army of BiH was General Mehmed Alagić. 100 square kilometres (39 sq mi) of territory was liberated in this action, among which was a relay.

== Background ==
Just before the start of the Bosnian war, the Vlašić plateau was under the control of the Yugoslav People's Army (JNA), which later converted to Army of Republika Srpska (VRS). At the beginning of the war, Babanovac, Galica, Gostilj, Smet and Komar were captured, while the road communications Travnik – Donji Vakuf and Travnik – Skender Vakuf were cut off. The first open attack occurred on May 1, 1992, on the Paljenik peak, which was defended by the Ministry of Interior of the Republic of Bosnia and Herzegovina, but defense failed. Subsequently, Bosnian forces began to form defense lines to prevent further penetration by Serb forces. Combat operations were managed by Travnik Municipal Defense Headquarters. In September 1992, the first liberation action was carried out from Komar to Vučija glava, when the defense lines were moved by 4 kilometers. At that time, Vlašić became the place from which the Republika Srpska Army deported exiles daily from Bosnian Frontier. In November 1992, the VRS occupied Karaula. The following year, the Bosniak-Croat war lasted, but with the signing of the Washington Agreement it was discontinued, and in March 1994 the transport of larger forces along VRS lines was made possible. At the end of March, Bosnian army took over Radijevac, Kvrkuša and Rustovi. For the purposes of the broader liberation, 7th Corps of the Army of the Republic of Bosnia and Herzegovina was founded, headquartered in Travnik. The first battle of the 7th Corps took place on April 24, when the VRS made an attack on the Vlašić plateau and occupied Meokrnje and Glavica. Still, in the counterattack, the 7th Corps forces regained lost ground. The liberation operations continued in May, when the objects of Bjeljik, Crni vrh and the villages of Fonjige, Pobrđani, Šahmani, Brdo, Dolani, and Korenići were taken, and in July the location of Srneća brda was liberated.

At the end of the summer of 1994, preparations began for the liberation of Vlašić. Material resources were raised for this purpose and a large number of people were hired. In addition to supplying basic resources, several log cabins were built for 4,000 fighters, as settlements were far away and operations planned for the winter of 1995 were supposed to occur during low temperatures. Also, 3,000 white camouflage uniforms were sewn in Travnik for the snow camouflage. A four-month ceasefire with the VRS was signed in late 1994, which was in favor of the liberation action, when the 7th Corps Command used that time to organize units and to provide additional training. Accordingly, a training plan called "Bura 95" was launched, which rehearsed new and specific methods of performing the action.

Immediately after receiving the directive on the conduct of the liberation operation by the General Staff of the ARBiH, the 7th Corps Command began to prepare the operation. After the inspection of the units of the 7th Corps on February 7, 1995, in Travnik, and the surrender of war flags, the 7th Corps was officially ready for the start of the liberation action.

War reports said the VRS did not respect the signed ceasefire, especially in the area of responsibility of the 5th Corps near Bihać. The 7th Corps commander, General Mehmed Alagić, repeatedly emphasized that any attack on the 5th Corps was also an attack on the 7th Corps. In early 1995, the Bosnian Serbs did not respect the ceasefire in the area of responsibility of the 7th Corps, also. Travnik and its wider surroundings were shelled daily. At that time, the 7th Corps trained its units with a focus on preparing units planned for the continuation of the war as liberation units, notably the 17th Knights, the 705th Glorious, and the 727th Glorious Brigades.

The operation plan for the liberation of Vlašić, code-named "Range 95" (Bosnian: Domet 95), was completed in February. The plan of the operation was to attack the VRS on a broader front, practically the entire area of responsibility of the 7th Corps on the Vlašić plateau, and break out of the Smet – Gostilj – Vitovlje – Koric communication. The operation was scheduled to begin on February 20, 1995, and involved 10 brigades, 9 tanks and transporters, 25 howitzers and cannons, 191 mortars and 24 480 troops. The duration of the operation was 5 days. On the other hand, the defense of Vlašić consisted of 3 VRS brigades with about 5,000 soldiers, 9 tanks, 15 howitzers and cannons and 76 mortars.

Although the start of the operation was planned for February 20, 1995, due to bad weather, the operation was delayed for February 24. The start of the operation was marked by the undertaking of the Special Forces of the 712th and 737th Brigades, when two groups of about 400 fighters descended overnight on a 12-meter cliff on the Galica plateau and completely surprised the enemy in the morning of February 24, killing 62 VRS members.

However, in the first days, the main attack failed due to poor implementation during the installation of the bridge defenses, which was used by the aggressor to pull PATs whose operations caused losses to the 705th ARBiH Brigade. With that, the plan to liberate Vlašić within five days failed.

Seeing that the Vlašić liberation plan had failed, the 7th Corps Command made additional preparations to conduct a new operation called "Range 1" (Bosnian: Domet 1). On that occasion, VRS radios were eavesdropped, which made the implementation of the action much easier. The failure analysis of February 24 was approached and it was concluded that the main reason for the absence of the main attack was the inability to evacuate from deep snow if any of the units fell into ambush.

== Battles ==
=== Operation "Domet-95" ===
The operational plan to capture Vlašić, codenamed "Range 95" (Bosnian: Domet-95), was completed in February 1995. The operation plan was to attack the VRS on a wider front, practically in the entire area of responsibility of the 7th Corps on the Vlašić plateau, and to break through the Smet-Gostilj-Vitovlje-Koric communication. The operation was to begin on February 20, 1995, and included 10 brigades, 9 tanks and transporters, 25 howitzers and cannons, 191 mortars, and 24,480 soldiers. The duration of the operation was five days. On the other hand, Vlašić's defense consisted of three VRS brigades with approximately 5,000 soldiers, 9 tanks, 15 howitzers and cannons, and 76 mortars.

Although the start of the operation was planned for February 20, 1995, due to bad weather, the operation was postponed to February 24. The beginning of the operation was marked by an attack by special units of the 712nd and 737th Brigades, when two groups of approximately 400 fighters descended overnight on a 12-meter cliff on the Galica plateau and completely surprised the enemy on the morning of February 24, killing 62 VRS members.

However, in the first days, the main attack failed due to poor conduct during the setting up of the bridge's defenses, which the enemy used to withdraw the PAT, whose operations caused losses to the 705th ARBiH Brigade. With that, the plan to release Vlašić within five days failed.

=== Operation "Domet-1" ===
Due to the failed release of Vlašić, the command of the 7th Corps made additional preparations for a new operation called "Range 1" (Bosnian: Domet-1). On that occasion, VRS radio stations were tapped, which made the implementation of the action much easier. An analysis of the failure on February 24 concluded that the main reason for the absence of the main attack was the impossibility of evacuating from the deep snow if any of the units fell into an ambush.

The attack on Mount Vlašić (Operation "Range-1") began at 4:30 a.m. on March 20, 1995, with brief but fierce artillery and mortar fire against positions held by the 22nd VRS Infantry Brigade / 30th Infantry Division. Selected soldiers of the Guards Brigade of the General Staff, the 17th Knights Krajina Brigade and the 727th Mountain Brigade set off in the early morning hours before dawn to overcome the surprised outposts of the VRS. The next day, an elite unit, the 7th Muslim Brigade, was involved in the fighting, intensifying the attack.

Even after the ARBiH released the news of its sudden offensive, the direction of the fighting at the top of Vlašić remained unclear for days. In other news, the 7th ARBiH Corps carried out a secondary attack on the Komar Mountains west of Turbe and around Donji Vakuf to divert the reserves of the 30th Infantry Division / 1st Krajina Corps of Major General VRS from the main target of the ARBiH attack. Behind the fog of war and the winter storm, only a growing number of fleeing Serb refugees indicated that ARBiH was gaining the upper hand. By March 25, UN aid officials reported that more than 1,200 Serbs had evacuated the town of Imljan, some 12 km northwest of Mount Vlašić, and that more were fleeing. They also believed that the ARBiH had erected a television tower on the 1,933-meter-high Paljenik peak on Mount Vlašić, but bad weather and UN restrictions on the movement of fighters prevented them from confirming this. Other reports suggest that the HVO actively assisted in the offensive, almost certainly with artillery. After the disappearance of the report and the impenetrable weather, fierce fighting lasted for days as Alagić's 7th Corps stormed the mountain, showered with blizzards of the late winter months and temperatures lower than −25 °C.

The outcome of the battle for Mount Vlašić remained uncertain until April 4, when General Alagic announced that his troops were holding a victory celebration at its summit. Although Alagić undoubtedly occupied the top of Paljenik and about 50 square kilometers around it, there were reports that the Serbs in the retreat destroyed the fighting facilities, the communication facility, instead of leaving it in Bosniak hands. Nevertheless, Radio Television of Bosnia and Herzegovina (RTV BiH) broadcast images of jubilant Bosniak troops splashing in deep snow on top of the mountain, celebrating one of ARBiH's signal victories in the war. The conquest of the summit was astonishing evidence of the improvement of the army and gave a huge boost to the morale of the government of the Republic of Bosnia and Herzegovina. In the long run, this will also be considered the first step of the ARBiH-HVO on the road to a territorial rematch of Donji Vakuf and Jajce.

ARBiH's occupation of the long-disputed Vlašić Mountain was also a significant measure to improve ARBiH's capabilities vis-à-vis the VRS. Although in the end the victory was hiking with poor terrain to win the battle at close range – the basic tactic of ARBiH since the beginning of the war – its execution differed from previous campaigns by visible improvements in equipment, planning, organization and execution. UN military observers and Western journalists reported on better-equipped ARBiH units now going out into the field, with their soldiers carrying appropriate small arms and ammunition, jackets, helmets and radios. Observers also noted changes in ARBiH's tactics toward more mobile, offensive operations such as improvements in brigade organization, more experienced planning staff, greater ability to coordinate concurrent operations, and better training of individual soldiers. UN officials noted, for example, that the ARBiH offensive on Vlašić and Stolice began with separate operations on the battlefield that began within 100 km and began within minutes – visible evidence that ARBiH has finally mastered targeting. complex concurrent operations at separate locations. ARBiH was not yet equal to the VRS in terms of armaments, operational planning and execution on the battlefield, but the gap in capabilities between the two sides narrowed dramatically compared to the first days in early 1992.

== Aftermath ==
Regardless of the changing course of the operation, it was considered by the 7th Corps Command and the ARBiH General Staff as the greatest success of the ARBiH and the milestone in the liberation struggle, since it has been proven that the ARBiH can perform liberation operations in the most extreme conditions. Morale increased strongly among all members of the ARBiH, so many units wanted to come to Vlašić's aid. The population of central Bosnia celebrated a major victory. Members of the women's association "Sumeja" brought to the fighters, in the positions themselves, hot food, clothes, shoes, sunglasses against snow blindness, etc. Many municipalities have sent significant donations in food and oil, with the municipality of Visoko being particularly prominent. The Vlašić victory triggered all segments of the Bosnian society and gave the unprecedented motive to move decisively towards the preparation of a series of new liberation operations.

Based on the available documentation of the 1st Krajina Corps of the VRS, 65 VRS members were killed and disappeared in the period from March 20 to 23, 1995, while the ARBiH General Staff recovered 60 bodies of VRS members in Vlašić after the field analysis. It is estimated that about 200 VRS members were killed during the operation. 180 were seriously injured, while about 350 VRS personnel were injured. The losses of the ARBiH forces were also relatively large. Taking into account the data on the first attempt to conduct the operation – on February 24, 1995, the ARBiH forces had 70 dead, 78 seriously wounded and 312 slightly wounded soldiers. Also, 5 fighters disappeared, while 54 froze. In the first five days of the operation, while the VRS was still surprised by the attack, the losses of ARBiH were much smaller compared to the period of the 1: 5 ratio of success. 70% of the killed fighters were killed by a shotgun. 71% of the killed members of the ARBiH were under 30 years of age.

Although the operation of Vlašić's liberation was expected to bring abundant war loots, it did not. Moreover, there is almost no information on the collected infantry weapons, ammunition and other equipment. During the liberation of the Santic area, one T-34 tank and five motor vehicles were captured, which, due to lack of fuel, could not be pulled out. It was especially important for the 7th Corps command to capture a howitzer (105 mm) and a cannon (130 mm) and a tank and sill that glowed death across the Travnik from Galica, but it was evident that the VRS had pulled them out in time. However, one threshold and a T-55 tank was destroyed in the area of Harambašine vode and Kukotnica. In addition, 3 cannons, 11 mortars, 4 PATs, 6 PAMs, 2 BSTs, 2 mallets and one hand grenade launcher were captured.

After the war, Vlašić mountain is incorporated into the Federation of Bosnia and Herzegovina entity.

== See also ==
- Operation Summer '95

== Literature ==
- Balkan Battlegrounds: A Military History of the Yugoslav Conflict, 1990–1995. Central Intelligence Agency – CIA. May 2002. ISBN 978-0160664724.
