= Pojske =

- Village
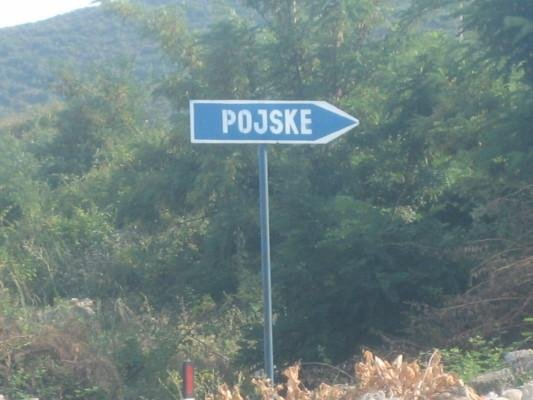

- Location within Bosnia and Herzegovina
- Coordinates: 44.2433815°N 17.8116935°E
- Country: Bosnia and Herzegovina
- Entity: Federation of Bosnia and Herzegovina
- Canton: Zenica-Doboj
- Municipality: Zenica

Area
  - Total: 7.58 sq mi (19.62 km^{2})

Population (2013)
  - Total: 1,842
  - Density: 243.2/sq mi (93.88/km^{2})
- Time zone: UTC+1 (CET)
  - Summer (DST): UTC+2 (CEST)

Pojske is a village in the City of Zenica, Bosnia and Herzegovina.

== Demographics ==
According to the 2013 census, its population was 1,842.

Ethnicity in 2013
Ethnicity	Number	Percentage
Bosniaks	1,735	94.2%
Croats	78	4.2%
Serbs	1	0.1%
other/undeclared	28	1.5%
Total	1,842	100%
