= Pokrajčići =

- Village
- Location within Bosnia and Herzegovina
- Coordinates: 44.2048646°N 17.7506637°E
- Country: Bosnia and Herzegovina
- Entity: Federation of Bosnia and Herzegovina
- Canton: Central Bosnia
- Municipality: Travnik

Area
  - Total: 1.50 sq mi (3.88 km^{2})

Population (2013)
  - Total: 1,540
  - Density: 1,030/sq mi (397/km^{2})
- Time zone: UTC+1 (CET)
  - Summer (DST): UTC+2 (CEST)

Pokrajčići is a village in the municipality of Travnik, Bosnia and Herzegovina.

== Demographics ==
According to the 2013 census, its population was 1,540.

Ethnicity in 2013
Ethnicity	Number	Percentage
Croats	1,529	99.3%
Serbs	3	0.2%
Bosniaks	1	0.1%
other/undeclared	7	0.5%
Total	1,540	100%
