= Dusina (Zenica) =

Dusina Дусина
- Village
- Location within Bosnia and Herzegovina
- Coordinates: 44°6′43″N 17°56′11″E
- Country: Bosnia and Herzegovina
- Entity: Federation of Bosnia and Herzegovina
- Canton: Zenica-Doboj
- Municipality: Zenica

Area
  - Total: 1.99 sq mi (5.15 km^{2})

Population (2013)
  - Total: 143
  - Density: 71.9/sq mi (27.8/km^{2})
- Time zone: UTC+1 (CET)
  - Summer (DST): UTC+2 (CEST)

Dusina (Cyrillic: Дусина) is a village in the City of Zenica, Bosnia and Herzegovina.

== Demographics ==
According to the 2013 census, its population was 143.

Ethnicity in 2013
Ethnicity	Number	Percentage
Bosniaks	137	95.8%
other/undeclared	6	4.2%
Total	143	100%
