= Šenkovići =

- Village
- Location within Bosnia and Herzegovina
- Coordinates: 44.1302668°N 17.605801°E
- Country: Bosnia and Herzegovina
- Entity: Federation of Bosnia and Herzegovina
- Canton: Central Bosnia
- Municipality: Novi Travnik

Area
  - Total: 3.75 sq mi (9.71 km^{2})

Population (2013)
  - Total: 418
  - Density: 111/sq mi (43.0/km^{2})
- Time zone: UTC+1 (CET)
  - Summer (DST): UTC+2 (CEST)

Šenkovići is a village in the municipality of Novi Travnik, Bosnia and Herzegovina.

== Demographics ==
According to the 2013 census, its population was 418.

Ethnicity in 2013
Ethnicity	Number	Percentage
Bosniaks	347	83.0%
Croats	65	15.6%
Serbs	2	0.5%
other/undeclared	4	1.0%
Total	418	100%
