= Kaćuni =

- village
- Location within Bosnia and Herzegovina
- Coordinates: 44°04′N 17°56′E
- Country: Bosnia and Herzegovina
- Entity: Federation of Bosnia and Herzegovina
- Canton: Central Bosnia
- Municipality: Busovača

Area
  - Total: 1.34 sq mi (3.47 km^{2})

Population (2013)
  - Total: 1,562
  - Density: 1,170/sq mi (450/km^{2})
- Time zone: UTC+1 (CET)
  - Summer (DST): UTC+2 (CEST)

Kaćuni is a village in the municipality of Busovača, Bosnia and Herzegovina.

== Demographics ==
According to the 2013 census, its population was 1,562.

Ethnicity in 2013
Ethnicity	Number	Percentage
Bosniaks	1,454	93.1%
Croats	103	6.6%
Serbs	3	0.2%
other/undeclared	2	0.1%
Total	1,562	100%
