= Amir Kubura =

Bosnian army commander

- Born: 4 March 1964 (age 62); Kakanj, SR of Bosnia and Herzegovina, SFR Yugoslavia (present-day Bosnia and Herzegovina)
- Military career
- Allegiance: (Socialist Federal Republic of Yugoslavia) SFR Yugoslavia (1987–92); Bosnia and Herzegovina (1992–96); Federation of Bosnia and Herzegovina (1996-2001)
- Branch: Land forces
- Service years: 1987–2001
- Rank: Army commander
- Units: 3rd Corps, 7th Muslim Mountain Brigade
- Commands: Army of the Republic of Bosnia and Herzegovina (ARBiH)
- Conflicts: Bosnian War

Amir Kubura (born 4 March 1964) is a former Bosnian commander of the Army of the Republic of Bosnia and Herzegovina and officer of the Yugoslav People's Army who was indicted by the International Criminal Tribunal for the former Yugoslavia and sentenced to two years imprisonment for 'plunder of public or private property'.

== Early life ==
Amir Kubura was born in the town of Kakanj in SR of Bosnia and Herzegovina of the SFR Yugoslavia on 4 March 1964. Kubura started his military career as an Officer with the Yugoslav People's Army where he served for five years, reaching the rank of Captain before leaving in 1992 in order to join the Army of the Republic of Bosnia and Herzegovina.

== Role in the Yugoslav Wars ==
During the early stages of the Bosnian War Kubura worked for the Chief of Staff of the 7th Muslim Mountain Brigade, 3rd Corps of the Army the Army of the Republic of Bosnia and Herzegovina from 1 January 1993 to 20 July 1993, he was then assigned Acting Commander of the 7th Muslim Mountain Brigade on 1 April 1993, before being made permanent Commander on 6 August 1993. During this period under Kubura's command were a number of Foreign Mujahideen from Islamic Countries fighting for the Bosnian Muslims. From January 1993 to January 1994 in Central Bosnia the Bosnian Army and the Mujahideen engaged in heavy assaults on the Bosnian Croat forces called the Croatian Defence Council, the fighting intensified in the municipalities Kakanj, Travnik and Zenica. The attacks were aimed at primarily at Bosnian Croat towns and villages however Bosnian Serb settlements were also targeted around 200 Croat and Serb civilians were killed and many more were wounded. Croat and Serb property was destroyed and plundered without military justification. Houses, buildings, religious sites, livestock and institutions were damaged or desecrated. In November 1993 Kubura's 7th Muslim Mountain Brigade of the 3rd Corps were involved in an offensive on the Croatian held town of Vareš. During Kubura's trial the Prosecution claimed that from 3–4 November 1993 in Vareš the 7th Muslim Brigade "shattered the shop windows and broke down the doors of all the shops in town in order to get to the booty". Ralf Wekesser a former monitor for the European Community Monitoring Mission testified to the ICTY in Kubura's trial that on the 8 November 1993 that the "streets were full of people trying to loot and the roads leading from Vares were full of soldiers and civilians loaded with the things they had looted", however Kubura stated that he had ordered his 7th Muslim Mountain Brigade to leave Vareš on 5 November 1993.

== Trial and imprisonment ==
Kubura was first indicted by the International Criminal Tribunal for the former Yugoslavia on 13 July 2001 before been arrested on 2 August 2001 after he voluntarily gave himself up, he was then transferred to the ICTY two days later on 4 August 2001. On 9 August 2001 Kubura was charged by the ICTY on basis of his 'criminal responsibility as hierarchical superior' per Article 7 paragraph 3 of ICTY Statute for six counts of violations of the laws and customs of war per Article 3 of the ICTY Statute including "murder, cruel treatment, wanton destruction of towns and villages not justified by military necessity, plunder of public or private property." Kubura pleaded not guilty to all charges against him the same day.

Kubura was given provisional release from 19 December 2001 to 27 November 2003 before his trial officially opened on 2 December 2003. Kubura's defence lawyer Rodney Dixon argued that Kubura was the Chief of Staff and he wasn't officially appointed Commander until 6 August 1993, after the majority of the crimes he was charged with had already been committed. Dixon stated that "there is not much we have to answer in the case against Amir Kubura," and that the prosecution's arguments about Kubura's control of the 7th Brigade over the Foreign Mujahideen were "based on assumptions." Kubura was given provisional release from detention from 13 March 2004 to 15 March 2004 for him to attend the funeral of his mother.

On 15 March 2006 Kubura was acquitted for the majority of charges against him however he was found guilty due to his 'superior criminal responsibility' for "failing to take necessary and reasonable measures to punish members of his forces who plundered private or public property in the villages of Susanj, Ovnak, Brajkovici and Grahovcici in June 1993... [and] for failing to prevent or punish members of his forces who plundered private or public property in the village of Vares in November 1993" and he was sentenced to two and a half years imprisonment. The Defence appealed this verdict asking for the verdict to be overturned whilst the Prosecution appealed the sentence requesting that it be increased to five years imprisonment, however the Prosecution's appeal was dismissed by the appeals chamber. Kubura was granted early release on 11 April 2006 due to the 828 days he spent in pre-trial detention. On 22 April 2008 the Appeals Chamber Judges found that Kubura took the necessary and reasonable measures to prevent certain acts of plunder committed by those under his command in Vareš in November 1993 and reversed the Trial Chamber's charges for this conviction, his sentence was reduced from two and a half years imprisonment to two years imprisonment by the Appeals Chamber; however Kubura had already served his sentence.
