= Opaljenik =

Opaljenik Опаљеник
- Village
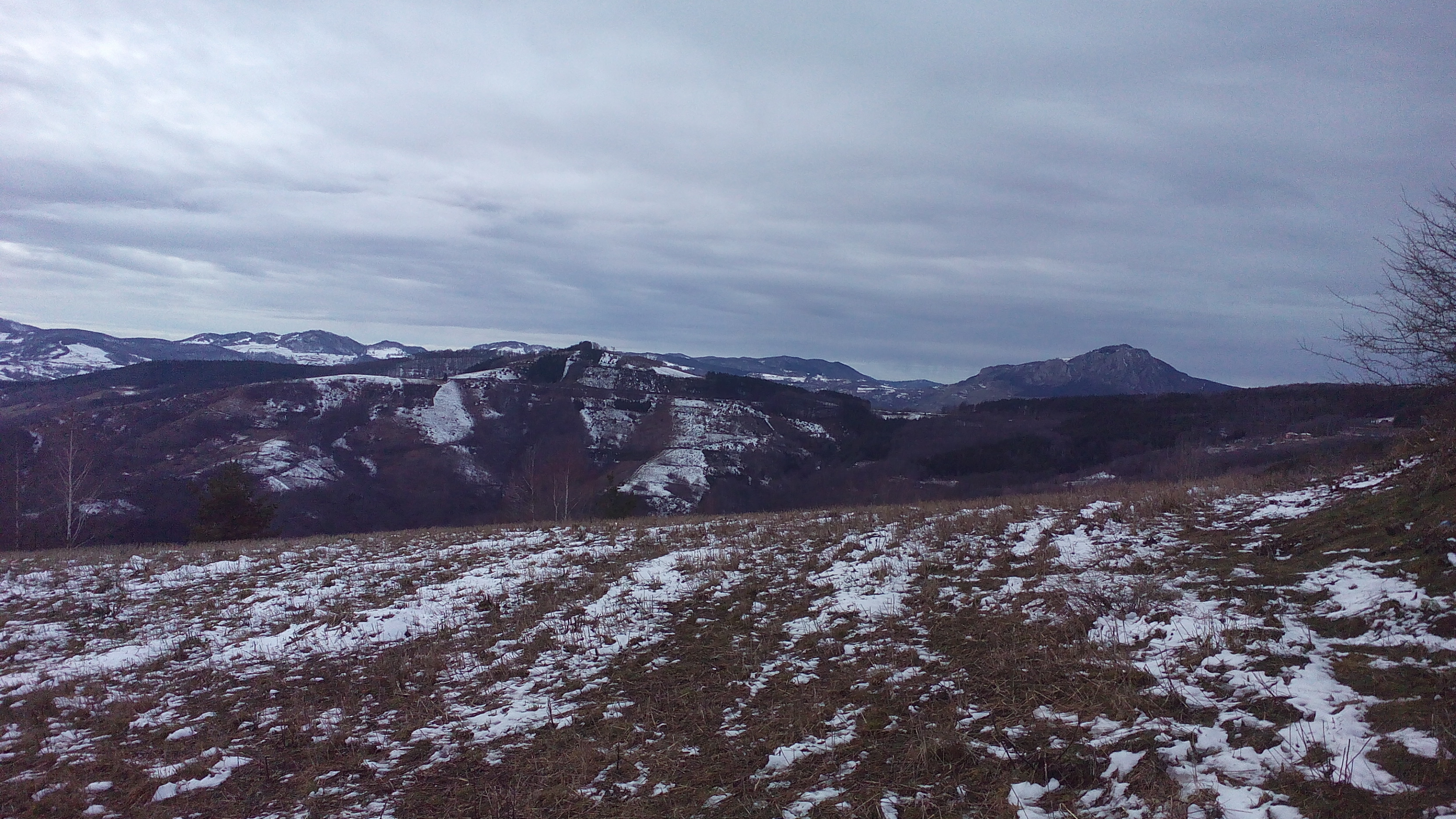
- Landscape from top of Opaljenik in winter; Mountain Mučanj in the right corner

- Location within Serbia
- Coordinates: 43°31′01″N 20°07′52″E
- Country: Serbia
- District: Moravica District
- Municipality: Ivanjica

Area
  - Total: 20.42 km^{2} (7.88 sq mi)
- Elevation: 718 m (2,356 ft)

Population (2011)
  - Total: 219
  - Density: 10.7/km^{2} (27.8/sq mi)
- Time zone: UTC+1 (CET)
  - Summer (DST): UTC+2 (CEST)
- Postal code: 32258
- Area code: +381(0)32
- Vehicle registration: IC

Opaljenik (Serbian Cyrillic: Опаљеник) is a village located in the municipality of Ivanjica, southwestern Serbia. According to the 2011 census, the village has a population of 219 inhabitants.
