= Bijelo Bučje =

- Village
- Location within Bosnia and Herzegovina
- Coordinates: 44.2105449°N 17.5582219°E
- Country: Bosnia and Herzegovina
- Entity: Federation of Bosnia and Herzegovina
- Canton: Central Bosnia
- Municipality: Travnik

Area
  - Total: 3.96 sq mi (10.26 km^{2})

Population (2013)
  - Total: 707
  - Density: 178/sq mi (68.9/km^{2})
- Time zone: UTC+1 (CET)
  - Summer (DST): UTC+2 (CEST)

Bijelo Bučje is a village in the municipality of Travnik, Bosnia and Herzegovina.

== Demographics ==
According to the 2013 census, its population was 707.

Ethnicity in 2013
Ethnicity	Number	Percentage
Bosniaks	675	95.5%
Croats	1	0.1%
other/undeclared	31	4.4%
Total	707	100%
