= Begov Han =

- Village
- Location within Bosnia and Herzegovina
- Coordinates: 44.3504596°N 17.9870974°E
- Country: Bosnia and Herzegovina
- Entity: Federation of Bosnia and Herzegovina
- Canton: Zenica-Doboj
- Municipality: Žepče

Area
  - Total: 0.98 sq mi (2.53 km^{2})

Population (2013)
  - Total: 1,299
  - Density: 1,330/sq mi (513/km^{2})
- Time zone: UTC+1 (CET)
  - Summer (DST): UTC+2 (CEST)

Begov Han is a village in the municipality of Žepče, Bosnia and Herzegovina.

== Demographics ==
According to the 2013 census, its population was 1,299.

Ethnicity in 2013
| Ethnicity | Number | Percentage |
|---|---|---|
| Bosniaks | 1,280 | 98.5% |
| Serbs | 3 | 0.2% |
| Croats | 0 | 0.0% |
| other/undeclared | 16 | 1.2% |
| Total | 1,299 | 100% |
