= Novo Selo, Zenica =

Novo Selo
- Village
- Location within Bosnia and Herzegovina
- Coordinates: 44.2250843°N 17.9335841°E
- Country: Bosnia and Herzegovina
- Entity: Federation of Bosnia and Herzegovina
- Canton: Zenica-Doboj
- Municipality: Zenica

Area
  - Total: 0.83 sq mi (2.15 km^{2})

Population (2013)
  - Total: 141
  - Density: 170/sq mi (65.6/km^{2})
- Time zone: UTC+1 (CET)
  - Summer (DST): UTC+2 (CEST)

Novo Selo is a village in the City of Zenica, Bosnia and Herzegovina. The etymology of the village comes from Slavic languages meaning new village, Novo Selo.

== Demographics ==
According to the 2013 census, its population was 141.

Ethnicity in 2013
Ethnicity	Number	Percentage
Croats	91	64.5%
Bosniaks	5	3.5%
Serbs	7	5.0%
other/undeclared	38	27.0%
Total	141	100%
