= Rasim Delić =

Bosnian Army general (1949–2010)

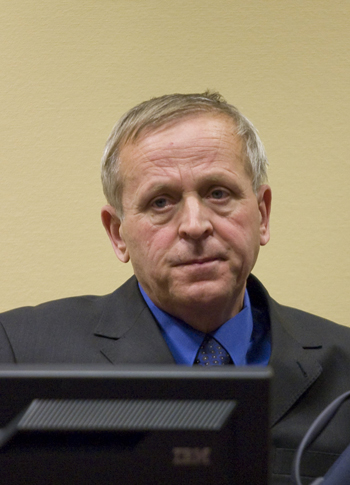
- Born: 4 February 1949; Čelić, PR Bosnia and Herzegovina, FPR Yugoslavia
- Died: 16 April 2010 (aged 61); Sarajevo, Bosnia and Herzegovina
- Military career
- Allegiance: Socialist Federal Republic of Yugoslavia; Republic of Bosnia and Herzegovina; Federation of Bosnia and Herzegovina
- Service years: 1969–2000
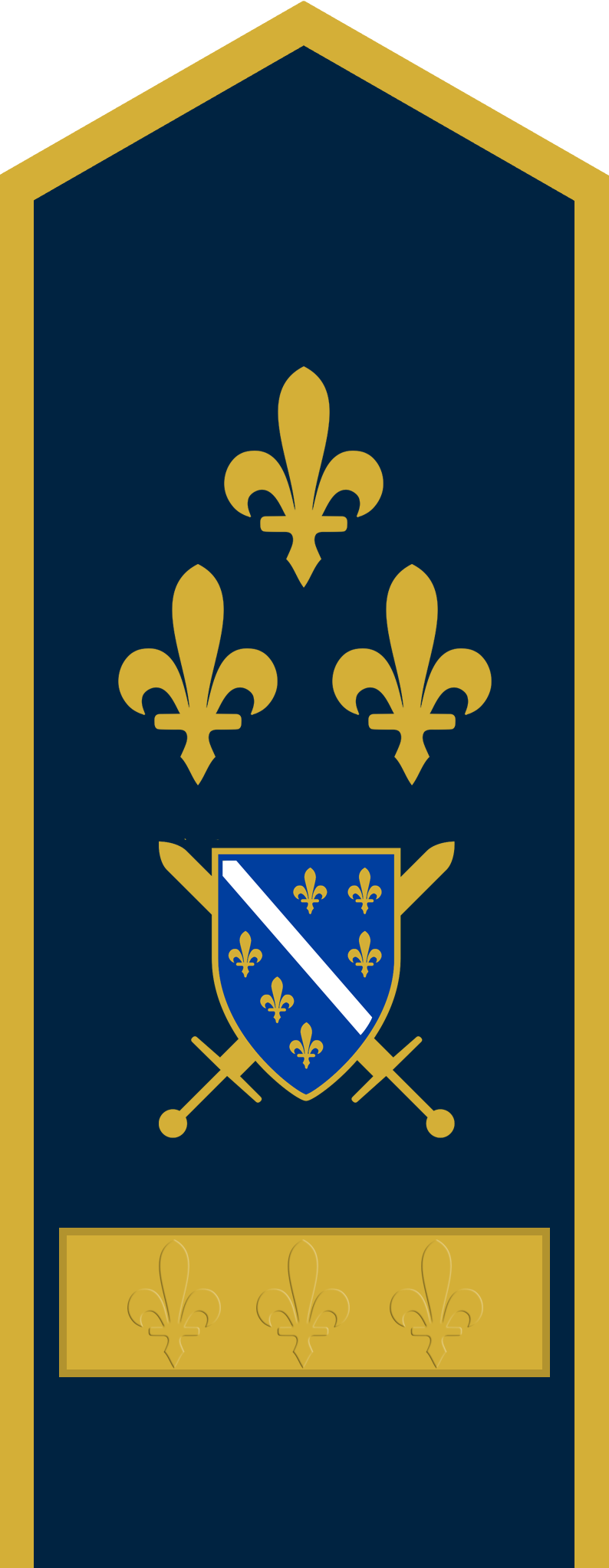
- Rank: Army General
- Unit: Visoko Tactical Group
- Commands: Yugoslav People's Army; Army of the Republic of Bosnia and Herzegovina; Army of the Federation of Bosnia and Herzegovina
- Conflicts: Bosnian War; Siege of Sarajevo; Siege of Mostar; Operation Lukavac '93; Croat–Bosniak War; Lašva Valley counteroffensive; Battle of Travnik (1993); Operation Tvigi 94; Battle of Kupres (1994); Operation Tekbir '95

Rasim Delić (4 February 1949 – 16 April 2010) was the chief of staff of the Bosnian Army. He was a career officer in the Yugoslav Army but left it during the breakup of Yugoslavia and was convicted of war crimes by the International Criminal Tribunal for the former Yugoslavia for failing to prevent and punish crimes committed by the El Mujahid unit under his command. He was sentenced to 3 years in prison.

== Career ==
=== Yugoslav People’s Army ===
Delić began his military career in the Yugoslav People's Army (JNA) on 1 October 1967 at the Military Academy for land forces, graduating on 31 July 1971. From 1971 to September 1984, he served in an artillery battalion of the JNA based in Sarajevo, commanding the unit from October 1980 onward.

From September 1984 to August 1985, Delić served as Chief of Staff and Deputy Commander of a joint artillery regiment. He commanded that same regiment from August 1985 to July 1990, during which time he was promoted to Lieutenant-Colonel on 22 December 1987. This command was interrupted from September 1988 to July 1989 while he attended the Command Staff School in Belgrade.

His final post in the JNA was as Assistant Chief of the Department for Operational and Training Services in the 4th Corps in Sarajevo, which he held from 16 July 1990 until he officially requested to leave the army on 13 April 1992.

=== Army of the Republic of Bosnia and Herzegovina ===
He was appointed Head of the Training and Operations Organ of the Territorial Defence of the Republic of Bosnia and Herzegovina (RBiH).

On 16 April 1992, he was ordered to leave Sarajevo, arriving in Visoko on 19 April. There, he worked with a group of Territorial Defence (TO) officers to form units in central Bosnia. These efforts led to the creation of the Visoko Tactical Group, which Delić headed. By 12 May, he had become a member of the TO Main Staff and was officially tasked with organizing and commanding combat operations in various municipalities in central Bosnia.

On 20 May 1992, the TO forces were transformed into the Army of the Republic of Bosnia and Herzegovina (ARBiH). On 17 October 1992, Sefer Halilović, then Chief of the Main Staff, appointed Delić as Acting Head of the Department of Operations Planning and Training in the Main Staff. This department was subsequently named Operation Command Visoko.

In autumn 1992, it was officially renamed Staff of the Supreme Command – Visoko Department, thus bypassing the command structure of the General Staff and Defense Ministry and reporting directly to the Presidency and the President.

On 27 April 1993, Halilović appointed Delić as one of four officers representing the ARBiH in the joint command of the ARBiH and the Croatian Defence Council (HVO).

On 8 June 1993, the Bosnian Presidency ordered the reorganization of the ARBiH Supreme Command Headquarters, establishing the post of Commander of the ARBiH Main Staff. Delić was appointed to that post, thereby assuming command of the ARBiH and becoming a member of the RBiH Presidency, which held wartime command authority.

A key accomplishment of Delić's command was preventing the collapse of the ARBiH during the second half of 1993. This stabilization of the front provided the necessary space for negotiations, mediated by the US administration, which resulted in the Washington Agreement in March 1994, ending the Croat-Bosniak War.

== Post military and retirement ==
Delić commanded the Army of the Federation of Bosnia and Herzegovina until his retirement in 2000.

Following his military career, he enrolled at the Faculty of Political Science at the University of Sarajevo in 2004, earning a doctorate in 2007. His dissertation was titled Nastanak, razvoj i uloga Armije RBiH u odbrani Bosne i Hercegovine (The creation, development, and role of the Army of the RBiH in the defense of Bosnia and Herzegovina).

He also co-founded the Udruženje za zaštitu tekovina borbe za Bosnu i Hercegovinu (Association for the Protection of the Heritage of the Struggle for Bosnia and Herzegovina).

== War crimes indictment ==
Delić was charged with war crimes by the International Criminal Tribunal for the former Yugoslavia (ICTY) and was subsequently sentenced to three years in prison.

The Trial Chamber convicted him for failing to prevent or punish the cruel treatment of twelve captured Serb soldiers. This treatment was perpetrated by members of the El Mujahid, which was under his command. The events occurred in the village of Livade and the Kamenica camp near Zavidovići in July and August 1995.

Following the verdict, Delić remained in the ICTY's Detention Unit pending the appeal process.

=== History and the charge ===
Foreign mujahideen arrived in central Bosnia in the second half of 1992 with the aim of helping their Bosniak coreligionists by conducting jihad against enemies of Bosnian Muslims during the Bosnian War. They came from countries including Saudi Arabia, Pakistan, Afghanistan, Jordan, and Egypt. On 13 August 1993, ARBiH officially organized foreign volunteers into the detachment known as the "El Mujahid" (El Mudžahid) in order to impose control and order.

The ICTY Appeals Chamber in the Kubura and Hadžihasanović case noted that the relationship between the ARBiH 3rd Corps, headed by Hadžihasanović, and the El Mujahid Detachment was not one of subordination but was instead close to overt hostility, since the only way to control the detachment was to attack them as if they were a distinct enemy force.

Soldiers of the El Mujahid Detachment committed various war crimes and engaged in cruel treatment of Serb and Croat soldiers, mainly prisoners.

Examples include the following:

- According to the indictment, on 8 June 1993, the same day Delić was appointed Commander of the ARBiH Main Staff, the ARBiH captured 200 Croatian soldiers who surrendered after battles in and around the village of Maline. The captured soldiers were ordered by the Military Police of the ARBiH 306th Mountain Brigade to march towards the nearby settlement of Mehurići. Near the village of Poljanice, they met a group of around ten mujahideen who took a group of about twenty Croat soldiers and one woman and ordered them to return to Maline. There, they were all ordered to stand in line and were subsequently killed. The indictment alleged that Delić was informed about these crimes but did nothing to prevent them or punish the perpetrators.
- On 21 June 1995, two soldiers of the Army of Republika Srpska (Momir Mitrović and Predrag Knežević) were captured and soon afterwards beheaded by soldiers of the ARBiH. The indictment states other prisoners captured on the same day were tortured and then taken to the Kamenica Camp. Another Serbian soldier, Gojko Vujičić, was alleged to have been beheaded on 24 July 1995. Other prisoners were forced to kiss the severed head, which was on display in the room in which they were held. Various types of torture were practiced in the Kamenica Camp, including electric shock and the insertion of rubber pipes into prisoners' legs, which were then inflated with increasing air pressure.
- On 11 September 1995, around sixty Serbian soldiers were captured along with three women and transferred to the Kamenica Camp. None of the soldiers were ever seen again, and they are presumed dead. The indictment alleged that the three women were raped and later freed on 10 November 1995. However, on 26 February 2008, Delić was acquitted on the rape charges under Rule 98 bis of the Rules of Procedure and Evidence, which allows for acquittal if the prosecution's evidence is insufficient to sustain a conviction. According to presiding judge Bakone Moloto, the prosecution did not present any evidence related to the rape count during its case.
- Another group of ten Serbian soldiers was captured on 10 September 1995 and subjected to torture for a period of twelve days.

The prosecution alleged that Delić knew the mujahideen and other soldiers of his army intended to commit these crimes, knew that the Kamenica Camp was a likely location for them, and did nothing to prevent them.

On 3 March 2005, Delić surrendered voluntarily to the ICTY. He pleaded not guilty on all counts.

=== Trial and verdict ===
On 15 September 2008, after a trial of approximately eleven months, the ICTY) rendered its judgment in the case of Delić. He was twice granted provisional release to Bosnia: once in May 2005 and again on 11 December 2007. The prosecution did not object to these decisions. During his second release, Delić was placed under temporary home detention after speaking with Haris Silajdžić. He was accused of discussing his case, though Delić maintained their conversation was limited to personal matters.

The prosecution requested a sentence of fifteen years in prison, while the defense requested an acquittal, arguing that his guilt had not been proven. The defense claimed that during the time in question, Delić did not have control over the Mujahideen and was therefore not in a position to stop or punish them.

The Trial Chamber acquitted Delić of crimes committed against Croatian soldiers in Maline, as he had been appointed commander on the day the crimes occurred. He was also found not guilty of cruelty and murder in the village of Kesten and the Kamenica Camp, where Mujahideen forces killed one elderly man and 52 Serbian soldiers and tortured 10 others. He was found guilty on a single charge: failure to prevent or punish the cruel treatment of twelve captured Serb soldiers in the village of Livade and in the Kamenica camp. He was acquitted on all other counts.

Although the war crimes of the El Mujahideen Detachment were proven, and a majority of the Trial Chamber found that Delić had effective control over the unit, the judges concluded that it could not be established beyond reasonable doubt that Delić was aware of the murders at the time they occurred. Consequently, he could not have stopped them.

Delić was sentenced to three years in prison, with 488 days already served in detention credited toward the sentence.

== Death ==
Delić died on 16 April 2010 in his apartment in Sarajevo. He was survived by his wife, Suada, as well as his two sons and four grandchildren.

== Publications ==
- Čast je braniti Bosnu (2002)
- Armija Republike Bosne i Hercegovine – nastanak, razvoj i odbrana zemlje (2007)
- 101 ratna priča (2010)
