= Grahovčići =

Village in Central Bosnia, Bosnia and Herzegovina

- Village
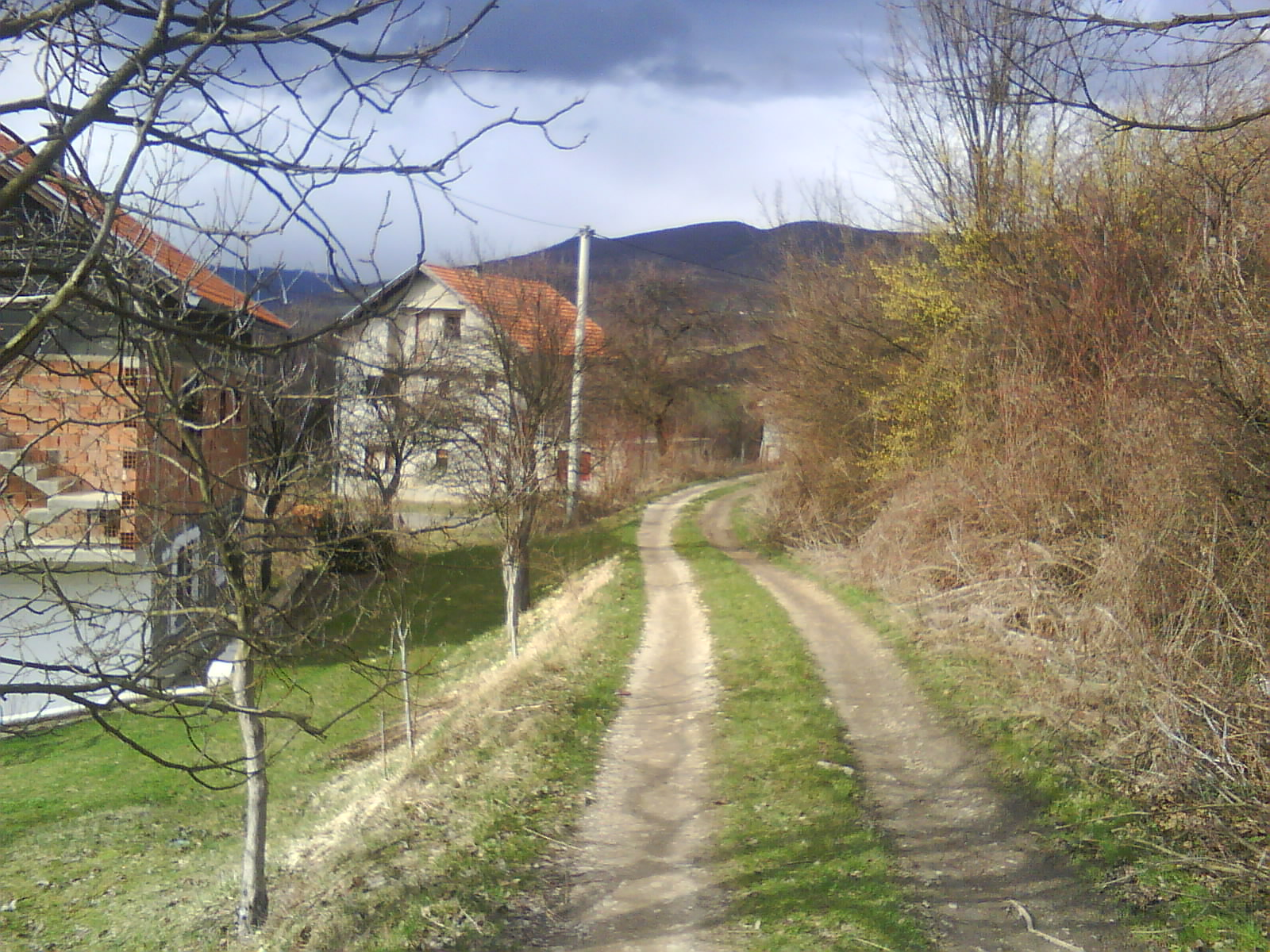

- Location within Bosnia and Herzegovina
- Coordinates: 44.2316465°N 17.7858799°E
- Country: Bosnia and Herzegovina
- Entity: Federation of Bosnia and Herzegovina
- Canton: Central Bosnia
- Municipality: Travnik

Area
  - Total: 1.54 sq mi (3.98 km^{2})

Population (2013)
  - Total: 403
  - Density: 262/sq mi (101/km^{2})
- Time zone: UTC+1 (CET)
  - Summer (DST): UTC+2 (CEST)

Grahovčići is a village in the municipality of Travnik, Bosnia and Herzegovina.

== Demographics ==
According to the 2013 census, its population was 403.

Ethnicity in 2013
Ethnicity	Number	Percentage
Croats	402	99.8%
Bosniaks	1	0.2%
Total	403	100%
