= Gornji Čajdraš =

Gornji Čajdraš Горњи Чајдраш
- Village
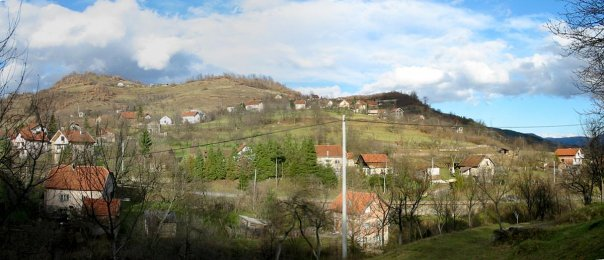

- Location within Bosnia and Herzegovina
- Coordinates: 44°11′N 17°52′E
- Country: Bosnia and Herzegovina
- Entity: Federation of Bosnia and Herzegovina
- Canton: Zenica-Doboj
- Municipality: Zenica

Area
  - Total: 2.03 sq mi (5.27 km^{2})

Population (2013)
  - Total: 664
  - Density: 326/sq mi (126/km^{2})
- Time zone: UTC+1 (CET)
  - Summer (DST): UTC+2 (CEST)

Gornji Čajdraš (Cyrillic: Горњи Чајдраш) is a village in Central Bosnia and Herzegovina. It is located about 5 km west of City of Zenica on the regional road Zenica-Travnik.

== Demographics ==
Before the last war in Bosnia, Čajdraš had about 1,500 inhabitants. Majority of the population are Catholics-Croats, but there are some Muslims-Bosniaks and Orthodox-Serbs.

According to the 2013 census, its population was 664.

Ethnicity in 2013
Ethnicity	Number	Percentage
Croats	406	61.1%
Bosniaks	229	34.5%
Serbs	5	0.8%
other/undeclared	24	3.6%
Total	664	100%
