= Guča Gora, Travnik =

Guča Gora
- Village
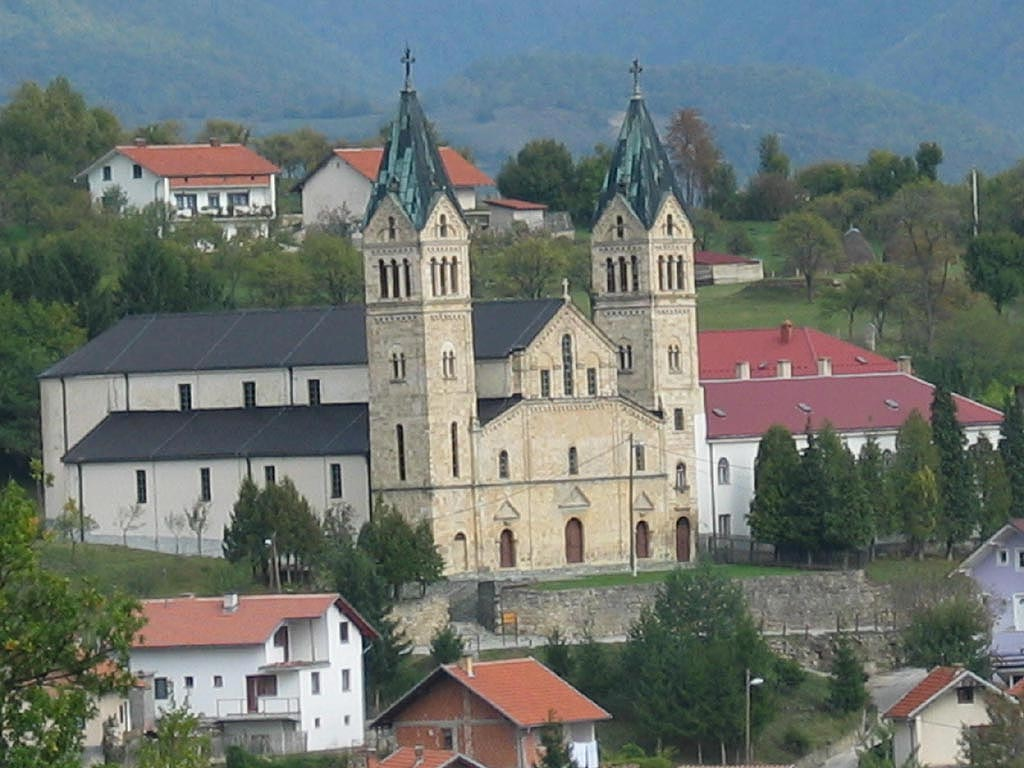

- Location within Bosnia and Herzegovina
- Coordinates: 44.2431572°N 17.7245282°E
- Country: Bosnia and Herzegovina
- Entity: Federation of Bosnia and Herzegovina
- Canton: Central Bosnia
- Municipality: Travnik

Area
  - Total: 1.43 sq mi (3.71 km^{2})

Population (2013)
  - Total: 511
  - Density: 357/sq mi (138/km^{2})
- Time zone: UTC+1 (CET)
  - Summer (DST): UTC+2 (CEST)

Guča Gora is a village in the municipality of Travnik, Bosnia and Herzegovina.

== Demographics ==
According to the 2013 census, its population was 511.

Ethnicity in 2013
Ethnicity	Number	Percentage
Croats	503	98.4%
Bosniaks	5	1.0%
Serbs	1	0.2%
other/undeclared	2	0.4%
Total	511	100%
