= Mehmed Alagić =

Bosnian general

- Born: 8 July 1947; Sanski Most, PR Bosnia and Herzegovina, FPR Yugoslavia
- Died: 7 March 2003 (aged 55); Sanski Most, Bosnia and Herzegovina
- Spouse: Ziska Alagić (m. ?–2003)
- Military career
- Allegiance: (Socialist Federal Republic of Yugoslavia) SFR Yugoslavia (1967–1992); Bosnia and Herzegovina (1992–1996)
- Branch: Land forces
- Service years: 1970–1996
- Rank: Brigadier general
- Units: Operational Group (OG) Bosnian Krajina, 3rd Corps, 7th Corps
- Commands: Army of the Republic of Bosnia and Herzegovina (ARBiH)
- Conflicts: Bosnian War; Battle of Travnik (1993); Liberation of Donji Vakuf (1994); Battle of Kupres (1994); Operation Vlašić (1995); Operation Sana (1995); Liberation of Sanski Most (1995)

== Military career ==
Mehmed Alagić graduated from the Yugoslav People's Army (JNA) military academy in Banja Luka in 1970. Later he became the commander of the military academy. In 1986, he became commander of the 36th mechanised brigade and in 1989 commander of the Zrenjanin brigade as part of the Novi Sad Corps.

== Bosnian War ==
Alagić left the JNA in February 1991. On 13 December 1993 he served in the 17th Krajina Brigade of the 3rd Corps of the Army of the Republic of Bosnia and Herzegovina. On 8 March 1993 he became commander of the Operational Group (OG) Bosnian Krajina within the 3rd Corps. He became commander of the 3rd Corps on 1 November 1993.

== After the war ==
In March 1996, as a member of the SDA party, Alagić was elected for the mayor of Sanski Most municipality and a member of the Federation of Bosnia and Herzegovina's Parliament.

In 2001 he was indicted for war crimes at the ICTY, but died before the trial commenced. Subsequent to his death, the case was terminated. His co-defendants were convicted and served jail time.

In December 2019, Sarajevo Canton initiated a process to name a major street in the city in General Alagić's honour.

== Military Ranks ==
=== JNA ===
- 1991 - Lieutenant Colonel

=== Army of the Republic of Bosnia and Herzegovina ===
- 1994 - Brigadier General
