= Enver Hadžihasanović =

Bosnian general (1950–2024)

- Born: 7 July 1950; Zvornik, PR Bosnia and Herzegovina, FPR Yugoslavia
- Died: 16 December 2024 (aged 74) Sarajevo
- Allegiance: Yugoslavia; Bosnia and Herzegovina
- Branch: Army of the Republic of Bosnia and Herzegovina
- Service years: 1973–2000
- Rank: Major general
- Commands: Commander of the 3rd Corps

Enver Hadžihasanović (7 July 1950 – 16 December 2024) was a Bosnian chief of staff of the Army of the Republic of Bosnia and Herzegovina.

== Biography ==
Hadžihasanović was born in 1950 in Zvornik, at the time part of the Federal People's Republic of Yugoslavia.

== Military career ==
Hadžihasanović graduated from the military academy in Belgrade in 1973. He then was transferred to the military stations in Tuzla and Sarajevo. As captain first class he led the command in the military academy in Belgrade. After that school closed, he was given the rank of major and commanded the battalion of the military police of the 7th Army in 1988. After a while, he was given the command of the 49th Motorized Brigade. That brigade was later transformed into a mechanized brigade; at the end of 1989 he was the commander of that brigade, with the rank of lieutenant colonel.

== Military house confinement ==
In the beginning of April 1992, Hadžihasanović was sentenced to military house confinement in Sarajevo by the Yugoslav People's Army, after which he deserted the JNA.

== Bosnian war ==
After Hadžihasanović quit the JNA, he joined the Territorial Defence Force of the Republic of Bosnia and Hercegovina (TO RBiH) of Bosnia. On 14 November 1992, he became the commander of the 3rd Corps of the Army of the Republic of Bosnia and Herzegovina (ARBiH). He held that position until 1 November 1993 when he became the exchange chief of staff of the high command of the ARBiH.

== After the war ==
From 1996 to 2000, when he retired, Hadžihasanović was a member of the Chief of Staff of the Federation Army of Bosnia and Herzegovina.

Hadžihasanović died on 16 December 2024, at the age of 74.

== War crimes ==
Hadžihasanović was found guilty of failing to prevent the death of a prisoner of war and cruel treatment, on the basis of superior criminal responsibility and sentenced to five years in prison. He appealed against the first-instance judgment and was released provisionally in June 2007 pending the judgement of the Appeals Chamber. On 22 April 2008, the United Nations International Criminal Tribunal for the former Yugoslavia (ICTY) reduced his sentence to 3 1/2 years.

== Military ranks ==
=== Yugoslav People's Army ===
- 1973 – Captain first class
- 1988 – Major
- 1989 – Lieutenant colonel

=== Army of the Republic of Bosnia and Herzegovina ===
- 1993 – Brigadier general
- 1997 – Division general
- 1998 – Major general
