= Jusuf Barčić =

Bosnian Salafist movement leader (1965–2007)

Sheikh Jusuf Barčić

Personal life
- Born: 25 September 1965 Barčići, Petrovice, Kalesija, Bosnia and Herzegovina, Yugoslavia
- Died: 30 March 2007 (aged 41) Tuzla, Bosnia and Herzegovina
- Cause of death: Car accident
- Resting place: Groblje Bukovčić, Tuzla
- Home town: Kalesija
- Education: Gazi Husrev Bey's Madrasa Islamic University of Medinah
- Known for: Founder of the Salafist movement in Bosnia and Herzegovina

Religious life
- Religion: Sunni Islam
- Creed: Salafi

Jusuf Barčić (25 September 1965 – 30 March 2007) was a Bosnian Salafist leader and the founder of the Salafist movement in Bosnia and Herzegovina whose leadership shaped the Bosnian Salafist community.

== Early life ==
Barčić was born in 1965 in the hamlet of Barčići in Petrovice, Kalesija to father Salih and mother Rasima. He studied at the Gazi Husrev Bey's Madrasa, where from 1984 to 1987 he memorised Qur'an and became a hafiz.

Barčić left Bosnia and Herzegovina during the Bosnian War and studied Islamic studies in Medina, Saudi Arabia. He studied under the mentorship of Al-Albani, one of the best-known Salafist authorities. While a student, Barčić did a final proofreading of the 1991 edition of Besim Korkut's Bosnian translation of the Qur'an. The publishing of the translation of the Qur'an was ordered by King Fahd of Saudi Arabia and was financed by the Ministry of Hajj and Waqif of Saudi Arabia.

During the war in the 1990s, Barčić was a representative of the Vienna-based International Islamic Relief Organization for the city of Zenica. The network established by the Islamic "charity" organisations helped spread material and non-material aid to the Bosnian mujahideen. Metodieva notes that the humanitarian assistance of the Islamic organisation was linked to the growth of the Salafist communities in Bosnia and Herzegovina.

== Religious activism ==
He returned in 1996 to spread Salafism, calling for "back to the roots" Islam and challenging the Islamic Community of Bosnia and Herzegovina. Along with Nusret Imamović, Barčić became one of the principal leaders of the neo-Salafist community that sought to challenge the traditional Islamic order in Bosnia and Herzegovina.

The first neo-Salafist group established by Barčić was in the village of Donja Bočinja near Maglaj. The majority of the members there were foreign fighters of the El Mudžahid detachment of the Army of the Republic of Bosnia and Herzegovina. Barčić, a charismatic figure with a Saudi educational background, was committed to the mujahideen ideology and refuted the legitimacy of the secular institutions, and worked to create a parallel society based on Sharia law.

When the Salafist community was established in Gornja Maoča in 2000, it had informal leadership. Its initial leader was Barčić. Barčić's efforts were financed by Muhamed Porča, a Bosnian cleric with whom he studied in Saudi Arabia and who headed the Al-Tawhid mosque in Vienna, where many Bosnian Muslims settled.

In 2004, Barčić was accused of threatening his former wife and her family with death after she left him because he molested her. He was eventually sentenced to seven months' imprisonment for molesting his former wife and served his sentence in Zenica. At the same time, he also received a conditional sentence of one year and three months because of the intrusion into his former wife's family home.

In the following years, the Islamic community was mostly dormant about Salafists' intrusion into mosques, schools, and cultural centres and began to confront them directly in 2007. In February 2007, Barčić and his followers tried to enter the Gazi Husrev-beg Mosque, seen by many Bosnian Muslims as the central institution of their religious life. However, they were again barred from entry by other believers, and the police of the Sarajevo Canton intervened. After the incident, the mosque was locked up to prevent further disruption, and the local imam Sadrudin Iserić forbade the Salafists further entry into the mosque.

Barčić and his followers attempted to enter the mosque for the second time on 22 February 2007 and were barred from entry again. Instead, he held a lecture in front of the mosque, criticising the Islamic Community of Bosnia and Herzegovina because they departed from the "true teaching of Islam" and demanding the implementation of Sharia law in Bosnia and Herzegovina, and implicitly threatened to establish a parallel Islamic community with Salafist ideology.

Anes Alic thinks that the organiser of the mosque takeover wasn't Barčić but his associate Karray Kamel bin Ali, better known as Abu Hamza, a Tunisian who acquired Bosnian citizenship. Abu Hamza was a military commander of the Bosnian mujahideen and shared a prison cell with Barčić for some time.

== Death ==
Known as a reckless driver who disregarded all civil authority, Barčić sustained serious injuries after losing control of his vehicle and hitting a lamp post near Tuzla around 2:00 a.m. on 30 March 2007. He died at 8:40 p.m. that evening at a hospital in Tuzla. Some media reported he died in an attempted suicide, which hasn't been confirmed.

Barčić was buried in his home village of Barčići. The funeral was led by his brother, Imam Ismet Barčić. His funeral was attended by 3,000 Muslims, some of whom clashed with the police. Among the attendees was Husein Kavazović, then Mufti of Tuzla and now Grand Mufti of Bosnia and Herzegovina.

Robert Donia, associate professor of history at the University of Sarajevo, has noted: "Barčić’s truncated career as a Wahhabist gadfly thus evoked a greater response on his death than during his life and served mainly to bring Wahhabism sharply into public focus."

== Legacy ==
Barčić was the founder of the Salafist movement in Bosnia and Herzegovina. Asya Metodieva writes that he had a formative influence on his successors, namely Nusret Imamović and Bilal Bosnić.

== Bibliography ==
=== Books ===
- Jiries, Tanja Dramac (2021). Balkan Fighters in the Syrian War. Routledge. ISBN 9781000436495.
- Karić, Ekrem (2004). Prilozi za povijest islamskog mišljenja u Bosni i Hercegovini XX stoljeća [Contributions for the history of the Islamic thought in Bosnia and Herzegovina of the XX century]. Vol. 1. Sarajevo: El-Kalem.
- Korkut, Besim (1991). Kur'an s prevodom [Qur'an with translation]. Medinah: Hadimu-l-Haremejni-š-Šerifejni-l-Melik. ISBN 9786038382158.
- Mulahalilović, Enver (1988). Vjerski običaji muslimana u Bosni i Hercegovini [The religious customs of Muslims in Bosnia and Herzegovina]. Tuzla: Hamidović.
- Racimora, William (2013). Salafist/Wahhabite Financial Support to Educational, Social and Religious Institutions. Brussels: European Union. ISBN 9789282343845.

=== Journals ===
- Giacalone, Giovanni (2014). "Il jihadismo nei Balcani: i nuovi focolai bosniaci" [Jihadism in the Balkans: the new Bosnian outbreaks]. ISPI Analysis (in Italian) (264): 1–14.
- Donia, Robert (2007). "Nationalism and Religious Extremism in Bosnia-Herzegovina and Kosovo since 1990" (PDF). Europe.
- Hesová, Zora (2021). "Wahhabis and Salafis, daije and alimi: Bosnian neoSalafis between contestation and integration". Southeast European and Black Sea Studies. 21 (4): 593–614. doi:10.1080/14683857.2021.1994209. S2CID 244669103.
- Metodieva, Asya (2021). "The Radical Milieu and Radical Influencers of Bosnian Foreign Fighters". Studies in Conflict & Terrorism. 46 (9): 1725–1744. doi:10.1080/1057610X.2020.1868097. hdl:20.500.14018/13937. S2CID 234149749.

=== News ===
- Alic, Anes (23 March 2007). "The Ringleaders of the Bosnia-Herzegovina Wahhabi Movement". Jamestown Foundation. Washington D.C.
- "Balkan extremists". The Economist. London. 12 July 2007.
- "Preminuo vođa bosanskih vehabija Jusuf Barčić" [The leader of the Bosnian Wahbbists Jusuf Barčić died]. Index.hr. Zagreb. 31 March 2007.
- "Preminuo vođa bosanskih vehabija Jusuf Barčić" [The leader of the Bosnian Wahabbists Jusuf Barčić died]. Jutarnji list. Zagreb. 31 March 2007.
- "Ubili Baričića, štite teroriste?" [They murdered Barčić while protecting the terrorists?]. Radio Television of Vojvodina. Novi Sad. 4 April 2007.
- Spahić, Merima (13 March 2007). "Vehabije jurišaju na BiH džamije" [Wahabbists are marching towards mosques in Bosnia and Herzegovina]. Nacional. Zagreb.
- Šarac, J (23 March 2007). "Vođa vehabija nije došao zbog džume" [The leader of the Wahhabites didn't arrive because of jumah]. Nezavisne novine. Banja Luka.
- Šarac, J (31 March 2007). "Sahrana Jusufa Barčića u nedjelju" [Jusuf Barčić's funeral on Sunday]. Nezavisne novine. Banja Luka.

=== Web sites ===
"Kalesijska ulema od 1941. godine do danas" [The ulama of Kalesija from 1941 to present]. Medžlis Islamske zajednice Kalesija. 25 November 2016.
