= Saudi foreign assistance =

Since the 1980s Saudi Arabia has provided foreign assistance to many countries and organizations.

Between 1976 and 1987, Saudi developmental aid amounted to US$49 billion. In 2006, it was reported that the country was the biggest per capita donor, though the aid had only been given to Muslim countries. The first donation given to a non-Muslim country was in 2006. Saudi charities, including those linked to the Saudi royal family, have been implicated as funding terrorism through purported charity donations, as well as funding radical Islam movements.

== Saudi fund for development ==
The Saudi Fund was set up by royal decree in October 1974, to stimulate economic growth in developing nations. In the next four years it gave soft loans totaling $3.1 billion to 51 countries, many of them with the lowest per-capita income bracket in the world. Almost 60 percent of approved loans earmarked for transport, power and water projects. By 1979, the fund accounted for about 30 percent of the kingdom's foreign economic aid. In 2019, Saudi Arabia, through the Saudi Fund for Development, has become the 3rd largest donor to UNRWA at it donated $800 million since 1994. Moreover, in 2019, the fund provided support to maintain Palestinian refugee camps in different countries.

According to the OECD, 2020 official development assistance from Saudi Arabia decreased by 25.3% to US$1.5 billion.

== Middle East ==
Saudi Arabia pledged $1 billion in export guarantees and soft loans to Iraq. For Lebanon, it pledged a total of $1.59 billion in assistance and deposits to the Central Bank of Lebanon in 2006 and pledged an additional $1.1 billion in early 2007. Of that aid, $500 million were intended for reconstruction.

After the 2003 Bam earthquake, Saudi Arabia pledged more than $200,000 to the victims.

Saudi Arabia is one of the largest providers of aid to the Palestinian people. In just the three-year period 1987 to 1989 Saudi Arabia provided $1.8billion in financial support to the anti-government fighters in Afghanistan around twice the amount it had given to the PLO in the previous 14 years. Since 2002, Saudi Arabia has given more than $480 million in monetary support to the Palestinian Authority, and has supported Palestinian refugees by contributing to the UN Relief and Works Agency (UNRWA). Through the Arab League it has provided more than $250 million for the Palestinians, and pledged $500 million in assistance over the next three years at the Donors Conference in Dec 2007. Unlike aid from other nations, Saudi Arabian aid to Palestinians was not disrupted by the election of Hamas.

In April 2022, Saudi Arabia and the United Arab Emirates (UAE) pledged $3 billion to end a war with Iranian-backed Houthi fighters in Yemen. The war has fueled a humanitarian catastrophe in Yemen.

== South Asia ==
After the 2004 Indian Ocean earthquake and the resulting massive tsunamis, the Saudi government gave $30 million in aid to aid the victims, including a $5 million private donation by King Fahd (Saudis in total, including citizens, donated more than $80 million).

In the aftermath of the 2005 Kashmir earthquake, Saudi Arabia donated over US$3.3 million, more than any other country, and promised an additional $573 million, also the maximum amount of money pledged. Saudi Arabia also provided 4000 pre-fabricated houses to Pakistan through the Saudi Public Assistance for Pakistan Earthquake Victims (SPAPEV). The houses, which were to be equipped with all required facilities, cost over $16.7 million. The SPAPEV also distributed 230,000 blankets, 150,000 quilts, 10,000 ordinary tents, 2,500 special winterized waterproof tents, 100,000 stoves, 100,000 food.

The Saudi government pledged $230 million to development in Afghanistan. It has also pledged $133 million in direct grant aid, $187 million in concessional loans, and $153 million in export credits for Pakistan earthquake relief.

In the aftermath of the 2010 Pakistan floods, Saudi Arabia has donated more than US$361.99 million for the relief operation, topping the list of all donating countries. Saudi royal family donated $20 million on the first day whereas Saudi citizens donated more than $107 million were collected in the first three days. Saudi Arabia started the largest air relief bridge in the history and also donated two hospital consisting of 100 beds.

== Balkans ==
=== Bosnian War and Bosnia and Herzegovina ===
The Bosnian Muslims received support from Muslim countries and Islamist organizations during the Bosnian War (1992–1995). Military operations, including Al-Qaeda activity (see Al-Qaeda in Bosnia and Herzegovina), were funded and supported by the Saudi High Commission (SHC), founded by Saudi prince Salman bin Abdul-Aziz. Pakistan supported Bosnia while providing technical and military support; Pakistan's Inter-Services Intelligence (ISI) allegedly ran an active military intelligence program during the Bosnian War which started in 1992 lasting until 1995. Executed and supervised by Pakistani General Javed Nasir, the program provided logistics and ammunition supplies to various groups of Bosnian mujahideen during the war. The ISI Bosnian contingent was organized with financial assistance provided by Saudi Arabia according to the British historian Mark Curtis.

According to Washington Post, Saudi Arabia provided $300 million in weapons to government forces in Bosnia with the knowledge and tacit cooperation of the United States, a claim denied by officials.

According to some media reports, the Active Islamic Youth was described as a front for the Saudi High Commission for Relief and the Al-Haramain Islamic Foundation.

=== Kosovo War and Republic of Kosovo ===
The Saudi Joint Committee for the Relief of Kosovo used $5 million to finance projects in rehabilitation, foodstuffs, relief materials, educational and religious programs, sponsorship of orphans, health care programs and development. Freights from Jeddah took 400,000 liters of milk as well as 900 cartons of clothing, 1,000 blankets, 25 water cisterns, medical supplies and surgical appliances such as wheelchairs to Pristina. Saudi citizens donated $20 million to Kosovo in cash as well as food and medical supplies, and the Saudi Red Crescent sent medical volunteers.

== Africa ==
In 2006, the Saudi government gave $10 million in aid to the horn of Africa, through the World Food Programme, of which Kenya received $2 million. Saudi prince Al-Walid bin Talal donated $1 million to help feed 3.5 million Kenyans during the drought.

== UNICEF ==
In 2017, Alwaleed Philanthropies, a Saudi Arabian charitable foundation, donated $50 million to the United Nations to help eliminate measles, the largest private donation ever to UNICEF.

== See also ==
- Foreign relations of Saudi Arabia
- Administration of federal assistance in the United States
