= Sakib Mahmuljin =

Bosnian military commander

Brigadier general Sakib Mahmuljin
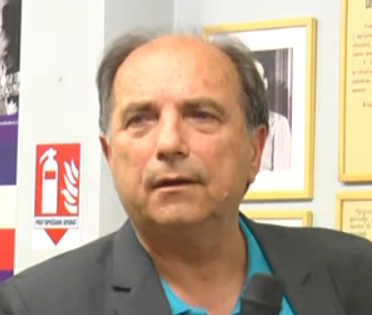
- Sakib Mahmuljin in 2021

Deputy of the Federal Minister of Defence
- In office 18 December 1996 – 12 March 2001
- Prime Minister: Edhem Bičakčić
- Minister: Ante Jelavić (1996–1998) Miroslav Prce (1998–2001)
- Preceded by: Hasan Čengić
- Succeeded by: Ferid Buljubašić

Personal details
- Born: 13 October 1952 (age 73) Prijedor, Bosnia and Herzegovina, Yugoslavia
- Party: Party of Democratic Action

Military service
- Allegiance: Socialist Federal Republic of Yugoslavia (1970–1991); Republic of Bosnia and Herzegovina (1992–1996); Bosnia and Herzegovina (1996–2001)
- Branch/service: • Yugoslav People's Army • Army of the Republic of Bosnia and Herzegovina
- Years of service: 1970–2001
- Rank: Brigadier general
- Commands: 3rd Corps
- Battles/wars: Bosnian War; Battle of Vozuća

Sakib Mahmuljin (born 13 October 1952) is a Bosniak former military leader who was convicted of committing war crimes against Bosnian Serb prisoners during the Bosnian War of 1992–1995 and sentenced to eight years' imprisonment in 2022. During the war, he served as the commander of the 3rd Corps of the Army of the Republic of Bosnia and Herzegovina (ARBiH).

At the start of the Yugoslav Wars, Mahmuljin joined the Muslim Intelligence Service. He later commanded ARBiH units in clashes with the Croatian Defence Council in central Bosnia. In September 1994, Mahmuljin was appointed as the commander of the ARBiH 3rd Corps, serving in this capacity during the Battle of Vozuća between July and September 1995. In the aftermath of the battle, foreign mujahideen embedded with the 3rd Corps killed more than fifty Bosnian Serb prisoners of war, some of whom were beheaded. Following the war, Mahmuljin oversaw the settlement of foreign fighters and their families in villages that Bosnian Serbs formerly inhabited and Bosnian Croats. He also successfully ran on the ticket of the Bosniak-dominated Party of Democratic Action (SDA) in the 1996 Bosnian general election. Later that year, he was appointed as the deputy minister of defence of the Federation of Bosnia and Herzegovina, a position he held until 2001. In this role, he aided the United States' efforts to train and equip the Army of the Federation of Bosnia and Herzegovina. Despite his reported ties with Islamic fundamentalists, U.S. officials reportedly considered him a moderate.

In December 2015, Mahmuljin was arrested by the Bosnian Police on charges of war crimes. The SDA condemned his arrest. In August 2019, Mahmuljin received an award from the Prime Minister of the Zenica-Doboj Canton, Mirza Ganić. The move was criticised by the Organization for Security and Co-operation in Europe. In January 2021, Mahmuljin was found guilty of failing to prevent the killing and mistreatment of Bosnian Serb prisoners in Vozuća. He successfully appealed the decision later that year. Still, he was found guilty again at his retrial and sentenced to eight years' imprisonment in April 2022, in a final decision that could not be appealed. In August 2022, it was reported that Mahmuljin had fled Bosnia and Herzegovina and gone to Turkey.

== Early life ==
Mahmuljin was born in the village of Kozarac, near Prijedor, on 10 October 1952, to Hamdija and Aida Mahmuljin. He attended the High School for Road Traffic, part of the Faculty of Economics. Between 1970 and 1989, Mahmuljin worked for the Department of Traffic and Finance of the Yugoslav People's Army (Serbo-Croatian: Jugoslovenska narodna armija; JNA) in Čapljina.

Mahmuljin is married with two children. Between 1989 and 1992, he served with the Republic Civil Defence Headquarters of Bosnia and Herzegovina. Prior to Bosnia and Herzegovina's declaration of independence from Yugoslavia, Mahmuljin was recruited into the Muslim Intelligence Service (Serbo-Croatian: Muslimanska obavještajna služba; MOS), founded in Vienna in 1991, by Major Fikret Muslimović, a former agent of Yugoslavia's Counterintelligence Service (Serbo-Croatian: Kontraobavještajna služba; KOS).

== Bosnian War ==
Following the independence referendum held from 29 February to 1 March 1992, the People's Assembly of Bosnia and Herzegovina declared independence from Yugoslavia. Mahmuljin was subsequently appointed to the General Staff of the newly created Army of the Republic of Bosnia and Herzegovina (Serbo-Croatian: Armija Republike Bosne i Hercegovine; ARBiH). Two of Mahmuljin's brothers, Omer and Nagib, were killed at the Omarska camp, near Prijedor, which was operated by the Army of Republika Srpska (Serbian: Vojska Republike Srpske; VRS) from May to August 1992. In December 1993, Mahmuljin commanded ARBiH units attempting to seize the Vitezit ammunition factory in Vitez from the Croatian Defence Council (Croatian: Hrvatsko vijeće obrane; HVO). "By taking that factory, we would be self-sufficient in weapons production," Mahmuljin told the reporter Chuck Sudetic, adding that the ARBiH had already reached the factory's perimeter. He dismissed threats by local HVO officials to blow up the factory rather than let it fall into the hands of the ARBiH, arguing that such a move would result in an "environmental calamity" that would spell "the end for the 15,000 people in Vitez." In September 1994, Mahmuljin was appointed as the commander of the ARBiH 3rd Corps, replacing previous commander Kadir Jusić.

In July 1995, the 3rd Corps launched an offensive against the VRS-controlled Vozuća pocket, west of Zavidovići. In the course of this offensive, the 3rd Corps managed to seize the villages of Krčevine and Kesten. Many Bosnian Serb prisoners were killed, mutilated and mistreated following their capture. Those who survived were transported to a detention camp in the village of Kamenica. In September, the 3rd Corps launched an operation to push the VRS out of Vozuća. The offensive was spearheaded by as many as 300 foreign mujahideen, who fought with great determination and managed to overwhelm the Bosnian Serb lines. The capture of Vozuća linked the 2nd and 3rd Corps, as well as the industrial towns of Tuzla and Zenica. Serbs captured during the offensive were again taken to the Kamenica camp. Among the captives held at Kamenica were three Bosnian Serb women. They were later taken to a detention facility on the outskirts of Zenica, where they were beaten, tortured and sexually assaulted by mujahideen, and kept in a shed without food or water for two days. More than fifty Bosnian Serb prisoners of war were killed by the mujahideen after the fall of Vozuća. Mahmuljin reportedly boasted that he had sent 28 severed heads to the Bosnian president Alija Izetbegović and an additional 28 to Iran. The killings were videotaped by the fighters, and the footage was later distributed in Bosnia and across the Muslim world.

In December 1995, representatives of Bosnia and Herzegovina, Croatia and the Federal Republic of Yugoslavia convened in Dayton, Ohio and agreed to a negotiated settlement to end the Bosnian War. Under the terms of the Dayton Agreement, Bosnia and Herzegovina was subdivided into two autonomous entities, the Serb-dominated Republika Srpska and the Federation of Bosnia and Herzegovina, inhabited primarily by Bosniaks (Bosnian Muslims) and Croats. Shortly after the signing of the Dayton Agreement, Mahmuljin arranged for 89 foreign fighters and their families to settle in the village of Donja Bočinja, near Maglaj, which formerly had a Serb majority. Mahmuljin also reportedly arranged for 300 foreign fighters to be settled in the formerly Croat-inhabited village of Guča Gora, near Travnik. In 2000, Dževad Galijašević, the head of Maglaj Municipality, ordered the expulsion of Mujahideen living in Serbian houses in the mentioned villages. However, the order was never carried out.

== Post-war ==
=== Deputy Minister of Defence ===
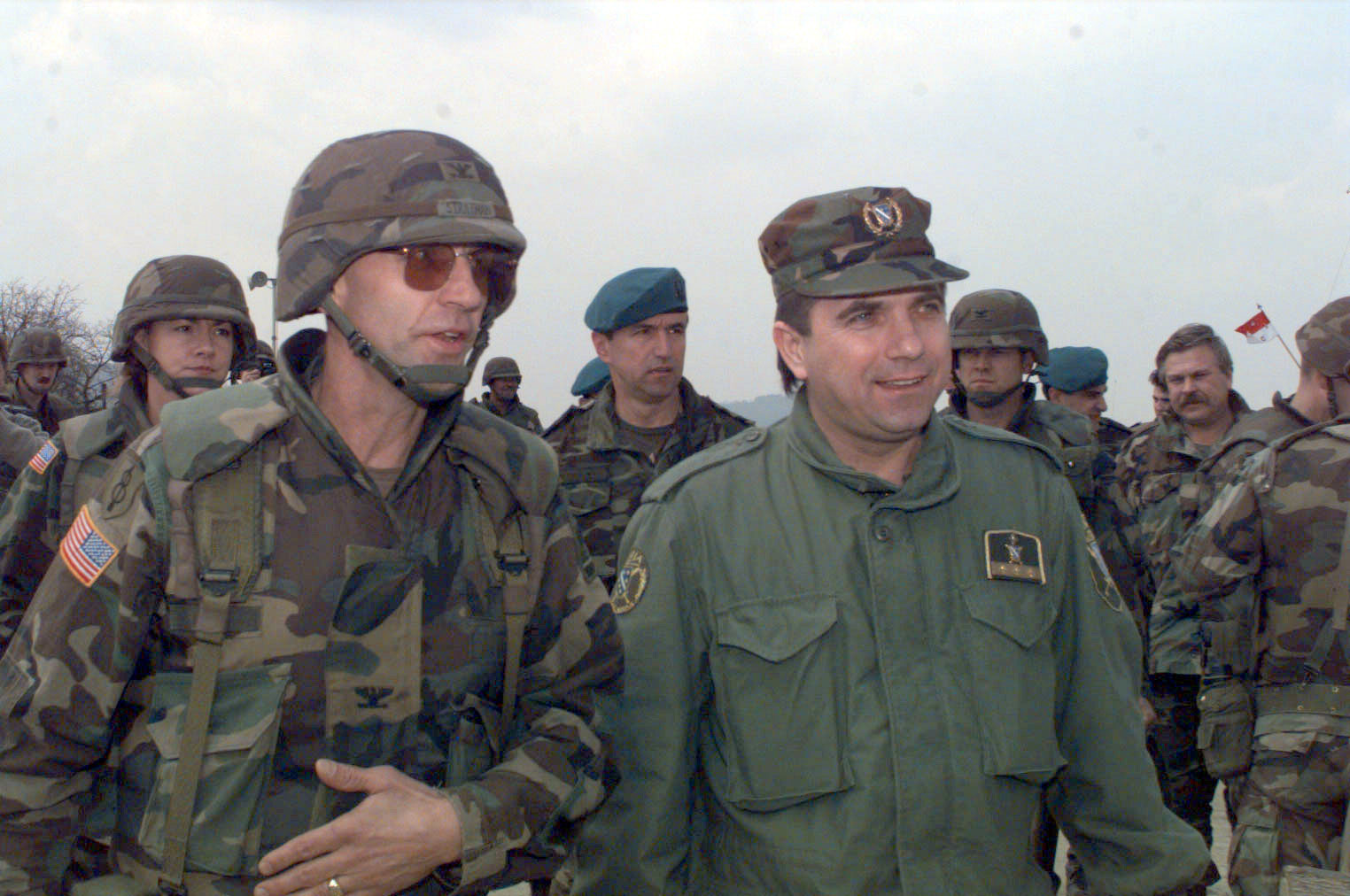
Sakib Mahmuljin (right) with Col. Stratman W. Henry (left) during Operation Joint Endeavour

Despite Izetbegović's personal assurances to U.S. officials that his Party of Democratic Action (Serbo-Croatian: Stranka demokratske akcije; SDA) would not enlist former military commanders to run in the 1996 Bosnian general election, three former ARBiH commanders—among them Mahmuljin—ran as part of the SDA ticket. Mahmuljin's candidacy and subsequent election, as well as those of his fellow ARBiH commanders Mehmed Alagić and Atif Dudaković, were lauded in a September 1996 issue of Ljiljan, the SDA's official news bulletin, and Mahmuljin himself was likened to the Bosniak national hero Osman Tanković.

On 18 December 1996, Mahmuljin was appointed as the Deputy Minister of Defence of the Federation of Bosnia and Herzegovina, serving under Ante Jelavić. The position had previously been occupied by Hasan Čengić, who was removed at the insistence of U.S. officials unnerved by his close ties to the Government of Iran. The Americans reportedly considered Mahmuljin a moderate. They also apparently looked past Mahmuljin's own connections with the Iranians. Mahmuljin and several other senior Bosnian government officials continued to protect hundreds of foreign fighters who remained in Bosnia and Herzegovina even after the end of the war, despite U.S. demands that they be expelled from the country. Nevertheless, U.S. officials viewed Mahmuljin as a "marked improvement" over Čengić, whose dismissal prompted the Clinton administration to green-light a program worth $400 million ($736 million in 2026) to train and equip the Army of the Federation of Bosnia and Herzegovina, which had been established in the post-war period as an amalgamation of the ARBiH and the HVO.

Although the Dayton Agreement had stipulated that all remaining prisoners held by the warring parties were to be freed by January 1996, two Bosnian Serb prisoners captured by the 3rd Corps in September 1995 were held captive at the Zenica prison for more than a year after the war's end, reportedly on Mahmuljin's orders. Mahmuljin reportedly wished to use them as bargaining chips to obtain information about the fate of his missing brothers. Captain Nenad Škrbić and lieutenant Dušan Skrebić were held without charge and spent most of their time in solitary confinement. In 1996, SFOR was alerted that Škrbić and Skrebić were still being held in Zenica. Still, every time SFOR personnel arrived to investigate the allegations, the two would be taken to a secret location within the prison. On 3 August 1997, SFOR officials arrived at the penitentiary unannounced and saw the two men. The prison staff initially refused to set them free, arguing they were prisoners of war. A tense stand-off ensued, and the following day, the prison officials agreed to release Škrbić and Skrebić, who were then ferried to Banja Luka by helicopter. The two subsequently told investigators they had been beaten and poorly fed during their captivity.

In 1999, Mahmuljin accompanied other Federation officials on an official visit to Pakistan in a bid to increase defence ties. He continued to serve as the Federation's Deputy Minister of Defence until 12 March 2001.

=== War crimes proceedings ===
In 2004, the newspaper Oslobođenje reported that the International Criminal Tribunal for the former Yugoslavia (ICTY) was preparing to indict Mahmuljin's wartime superior, ARBiH chief of staff Rasim Delić, as well as Ejup Ganić, a wartime member of the Presidency of Bosnia and Herzegovina, in addition to Mahmuljin himself. Although Mahmuljin managed to avoid prosecution by the tribunal, Delić was subsequently indicted. In 2008, Delić was found guilty of failing to prevent the killing and mistreatment of Bosnian Serb prisoners by foreign mujahideen and sentenced to three years' imprisonment. After the verdict was delivered, Mahmuljin denied any wrongdoing and said he had not exercised any control over the mujahideen.

==== First trial ====
On 12 March 2015, Boris Grubešić, the spokesman for the Bosnian State Prosecutor's office, announced that the allegations of war crimes that had been levelled against Mahmuljin would not be investigated. The decision was condemned by Bosnian Serb war veterans' organizations. On 8 December 2015, despite the statements that the Bosnian State Prosecutor's Office had previously issued, Mahmuljin was arrested by the Bosnian Police. The SDA released a statement condemning his arrest. War crimes prosecutors charged Mahmuljin with failing to prevent the mistreatment and killing of more than fifty Bosnian Serb captives, as well as the abuse of around twenty others, following the Battle of Vozuća. The crimes were alleged to have occurred between May and October 1995. Shortly thereafter, Mahmuljin was released on his own recognizance, pending the confirmation of the indictment. Mahmuljin's indictment was confirmed on 7 January 2016 by the Court of Bosnia and Herzegovina. The same day, he was released on bail. On 15 June 2016, former prisoner Miodrag Samac testified that foreign mujahideen had forced him to kiss the severed head of fellow captive Gojko Vujičić at a detention camp in the village of Gostovići.

On 29 August 2019, Mahmuljin received an award from the Prime Minister of the Zenica-Doboj Canton, Mirza Ganić, at a ceremonial session of the canton's assembly. The move was criticised by the Organization for Security and Co-operation in Europe (OSCE) mission to Bosnia and Herzegovina. "To overcome the legacy of war, Bosnia and Herzegovina must first respect innocent victims of war," OSCE official Bruce Berton remarked. "Awarding those who are accused of war crimes does the opposite while undermining reconciliation and community relations." On 9 December 2020, Mahmuljin delivered a statement before the court in which he said that no civilians had been killed by the 3rd Corps while he was its commander and that he had never issued orders that contravened international law. On 22 January 2021, Mahmuljin was found guilty of failing to prevent the killing and mistreatment of Bosnian Serb prisoners and sentenced to 10 years' imprisonment. The defence announced it would appeal the decision.

==== Second trial ====
At the appeal hearings, the prosecution urged the State Court of Bosnia and Herzegovina to not only uphold the original verdict but also to increase Mahmuljin's sentence to 20 years' imprisonment. Conversely, the defence argued that Mahmuljin should either be acquitted or granted a retrial. In early November 2021, Mahmuljin's conviction was overturned and a retrial was ordered. Mahmuljin's retrial commenced on 30 November 2021.

In response to the State Court's decision to order a retrial, as well as the arrest of eight Bosnian Serb war veterans the previous week on war crimes charges, around 100 Bosnian Serb protesters—including former wartime detainees and relatives of those still considered missing from the war—held a demonstration in front of the State Court and Prosecution building in Sarajevo on 7 December 2021, accusing the country's judiciary of being biased against Serbs. On 28 April 2022, the Appeals Chamber of the State Court of Bosnia and Herzegovina upheld Mahmuljin's conviction and sentenced him to eight years' imprisonment—one year for committing a war crime against the civilian population, 1 1/2 years for committing a war crime against the sick and wounded and 6 1/2 years for committing a war crime against prisoners of war. The decision was final and could not be appealed.

Following the verdict, no prohibition measures were imposed on Mahmuljin. In August 2022, it was reported that he had left Bosnia and gone to Turkey, ostensibly to seek medical treatment. The decision not to immediately detain Mahmuljin after his verdict was delivered was condemned by organisations representing Bosnian Serb war victims. Milorad Kojić, the director of the Center for Research on War, War Crimes and the Search for Missing Persons of Republika Srpska, said Mahmuljin was attempting to avoid serving his sentence and called for his extradition. In late November, the judiciary of Bosnia and Herzegovina issued an international arrest warrant for Mahmuljin, and in March 2023 an extradition request, both of which have remained unanswered by the Turkish authorities.
