= Christophe Caze =

French terrorist and criminal

Christophe Caze (22 October 1969–29 March 1996) was a French terrorist and criminal, a former medical student in Lille, France. Caze was one of France's foremost terrorists.

Caze was raised Catholic. A medical student, he travelled to Bosnia in 1992 to practice medicine, working at the Zenica hospital. He converted into Islam and joined the Bosnian mujahideen in the Bosnian War, a unit that fought Jihad against Serbs. He became an extremist, and is reported to have played football with heads of decapitated Serbs. Abu Hamza al-Masri, who was a Bosnian mujahideen, was the religious guide of Christophe Caze. Another French convert was Lionel Dumont, who also joined the mujahideen.

He returned to France a radical Islamist, and became the leader of a GIA group based in Roubaix, the "Gang de Roubaix". The group robbed banks, armoured cars and supermarkets with machine guns and grenade launchers.

In March 1996 the group planned to assassinate international leaders at the G7 meeting in Lille, using a car bomb. French police found the bomb, and then killed four in the group in an apartment shootout. Caze escaped but was shot dead the next day after trying to ram a police checkpoint, on motorway E17 near Kortrijk, Belgium. His address book was found to contain the contact information for Algerian resident in Canada, Fateh Kamel, another Bosnian mujahideen and suspect of militant ties.

== Sources ==
- Deliso, Christopher (2007). The Coming Balkan Caliphate: The Threat of Radical Islam to Europe and the West. Greenwood Publishing Group. ISBN 978-0-275-99525-6.
- Farmer, Brian R. (2010). Radical Islam in the West: Ideology and Challenge. McFarland. p. 158. ISBN 978-0-7864-6210-0.
- Kohlmann, Evan (2004). Al-Qaida's Jihad in Europe: The Afghan-Bosnian Network. Berg Publishers. ISBN 978-1-85973-802-3.
- "Christophe Caze: de l'islamisme radical au grand banditisme". Le Temps. 2007-01-16. Archived from the original on 2012-01-14.
- "L'enfant du Nord mort en barbuConverti à l'islam, Christophe Caze a été tué après l'assaut de Roubaix". Libération. 1996-04-04.
