= Kamenica camp =

Prison camp during the Bosnian War

- Prison camp
- Location within Bosnia and Herzegovina
- Coordinates: near 44°27′N 18°09′E
- Location: near Zavidovići, Bosnia and Herzegovina
- Operated by: El Mudžahid
- Operational: 1995
- Inmates: Bosnian Serb POWs and civilians
- Killed: 60+

Kamenica camp or Gostovići camp was a prison camp operated by the El Mudžahid, a force of Muslim volunteers operating as part of the Army of the Republic of Bosnia and Herzegovina (ABiH) during the Bosnian War.

== The camp ==
The camp was located in the Gostovići valley, 10 kilometres south of the town of Zavidovici in central Bosnia and Herzegovina. It was solely manned by elements of the El Mudžahid who although were an independent volunteer force, were under the command of the ABiH. The camp was in operation throughout mid-1995 and housed Army of Republika Srpska (VRS) POWs and Serb civilians captured during the four-month Battle of Vozuća.

== Atrocities ==
The Battle of Vozuća commenced on 27 May 1995. By 21 July, over a dozen VRS soldiers were captured on Mount Ozren and brought to Kamenica camp by the El Mudžahid. The POWs, some injured, were subjected to acts of torture and were provided inadequate food and water. One of the POWs was reportedly beheaded by the El Mudžahid, with a surviving captive forced to kiss the severed head of their fellow soldier. The severed head was hanged on a wall in a room housing the prisoners.

On 10 September 1995, ten VRS soldiers surrendered to soldiers of the ABiH. After being taken to ABiH headquarters, they were transported to Kamenica camp and arrived on 17 September 1995. After arriving at the camp, the captives were beaten. During this time period, an elderly Serb civilian was brought to the camp and joined the POWs. The Serb civilian was beaten and stripped of his clothes. He subsequently died. On 29 September 1995, the ten POWs were transferred to Zenica.

On 11 September 1995, approximately 60 VRS soldiers and an unknown number of Serb civilians were captured in the village of Vozuća by the ARBiH. The captured Serbs were ordered to march to the village of Kesten where en route, two VRS POWs were killed. After arriving at Kesten, members of the El Mudžahid seized the Serb captives from their ARBiH guards at gunpoint. The captured Serbs were transported to Kamenica camp where the POWs and civilians (including three women) were held separately. The three female civilians were subjected to beatings and sexual assault, including rape. The POWs were subjected to acts of torture including the severing of body parts, roasting, fracturing of limbs and gouging of the eyes. All POWs captured in Vozuća were executed, with many subjected to beheading and post-death mutilation of the body. The three female captives were later released.

== Trials ==
In 2005, Rasim Delić, former chief of staff of the ABiH who in 1993 signed an order authorising the formation of the El Mudžahid, was indicted for war crimes that included crimes committed at the Kamenica camp. Delić was found guilty and sentenced to three years imprisonment for failing to prevent or punish the cruel treatment of captives at Kamenica camp. In 2015, Sakib Mahmuljin, former commander of the 3rd Corps of the Bosnian Army was indicted for war crimes that also included crimes committed at the Kamenica camp. In 2021, Mahmuljin was found guilty and sentence to eight years imprisonment. However, Mahmuljin fled to Turkey and subsequent requests for extradition have remained unanswered.
