= Operation Brana '94 =

Operation of the Bosnian War

- Part of the Bosnian War
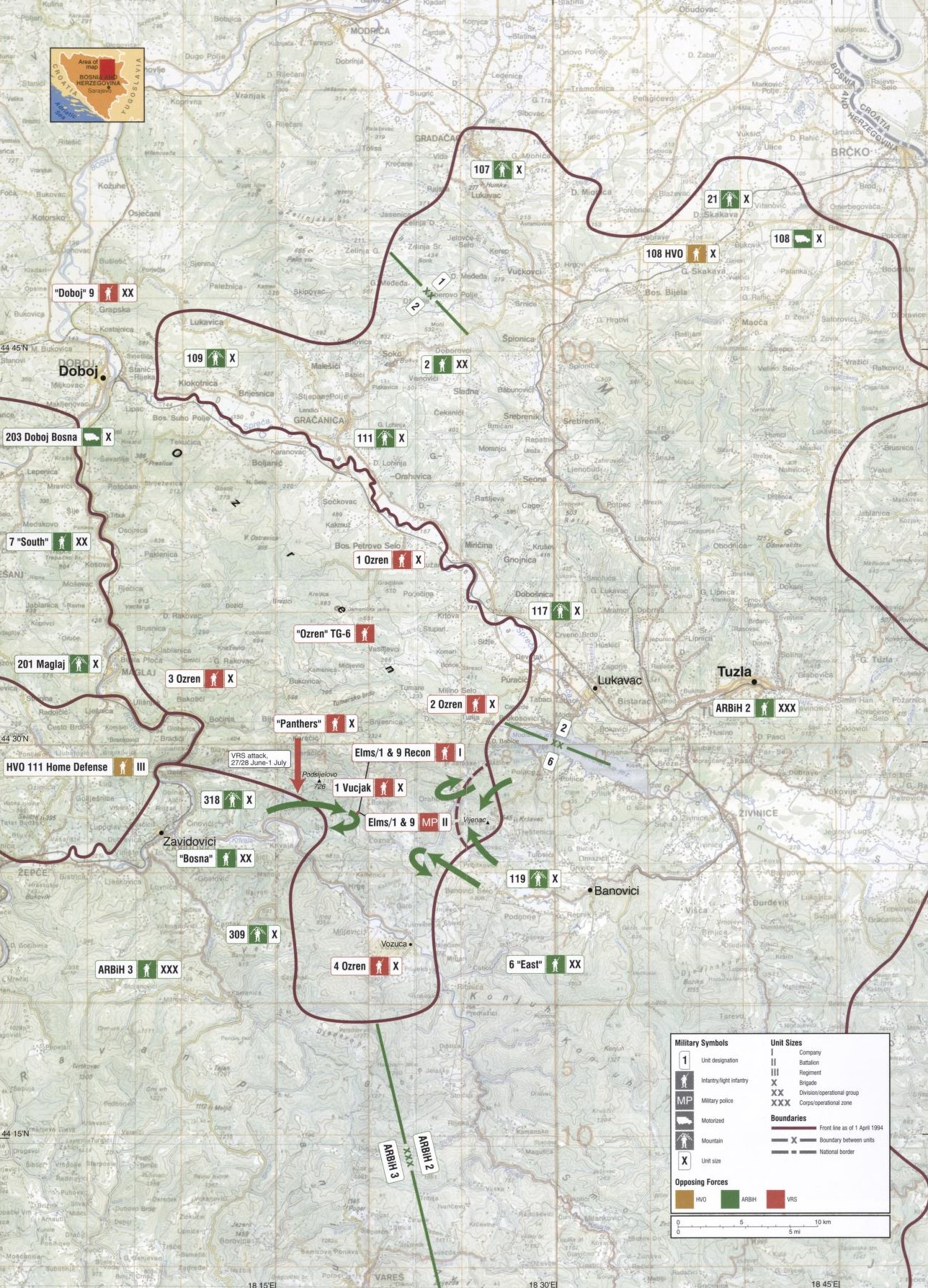
- Map of Operation Brana '94
Date	1 June – 5 July 1994
Location	Vozuća, Ozren, Republika Srpska
Result	Army of Republika Srpska victory: ARBiH units failed to cut off Vozuća from the rest of Republika Srpska, so they retreated

Belligerents
Republika Srpska	Republic of Bosnia and Herzegovina

Commanders and leaders
(Republika Srpska) Vladeta Živković (Republika Srpska) Nedeljko Suvajac	Refik Lendo; Jasmin Šarić; Fuad Ziklić; Ibrahim Hukić; Šerif Patković

Units involved
Army of Republika Srpska; 1st Krajina Corps; 2nd Ozren Brigade; 43rd Prijedor Motorized Brigade; 1st Srbac Brigade; Wolves of Vučjak; East Bosnia Corps; Garda Panteri	Army of the Republic of Bosnia and Herzegovina; 2nd Corps; 3rd Corps; Black Swans; Bosnian mujahideen

Strength
Around 3,000 soldiers	17,000 soldiers 500–700 volunteers

Casualties and losses
173 killed	400 killed

Operation Brana '94 was a major ARBiH offensive conducted by the 2nd and 3rd Corps of the Army of the Republic of Bosnia and Herzegovina against the Army of Republika Srpska in the Vozuća–Ozren region between 1 June and 5 July 1994. The aim was to sever the VRS-held Vozuća salient and link ARBiH forces from opposite sides of the Ozren massif. Despite overwhelming numbers, ARBiH forces failed to break through, and the VRS retained control.

== Background ==
Operational Group "Bosna," commanded by Colonel Refik Lendo, comprised about 5,000 troops from the 318th Zavidovići, 320th Zavidovići, and 309th Kakanj Mountain Brigades, reinforced by the 7th Muslim Brigade, the El Mujahid Detachment, Special Unit "Delta," and additional mountain/light brigades. The operation was supervised by General Rasim Delić, the supreme commander of the ARBiH Land Army.

While official ARBiH statements minimized the size of the attacking force, official U.S. military sources estimated around 17,000 soldiers from both corps participated.

The Vozuća–Ozren salient was heavily fortified by the VRS, including the Vučja Brigade and Motajica Battalion, reinforced later by the 1st Krajina Corps and East Bosnian Corps to strengthen the defensive line.

== Operation ==
Operation Brana '94 opened on 1 June 1994, with ARBiH forces attacking VRS positions at Svinjašnica, Podvolijak, Kamenička Premeć, and Podsjelovo. The offensive was structured in two echelons: the first attacked forward VRS positions, while the second provided support and reserves. Elite units such as the Black Swans seized several key positions and temporarily disrupted VRS defenses.

Despite early local gains, VRS forces maintained control over critical elevations, utilizing pre-prepared defensive positions and forested terrain to their advantage. A ten-day ceasefire in mid-June allowed both sides to regroup.

The main offensive resumed on 18 June, with the 3rd Corps attacking from the west and the 2nd Corps from the east in a coordinated pincer movement. Initial gains threatened VRS supply lines, and by 26 June, ARBiH units had advanced to within three kilometers of linking up. However, the VRS reinforced the sector with mechanized units and counter-battery fire, stabilizing the front. ARBiH assaults by elite units were repeatedly repulsed, and casualties mounted.

On 1 July, the VRS launched a counterattack involving the 1st Krajina Corps and East Bosnian Corps. ARBiH units, hampered by exhaustion, terrain, and pre-registered minefields, were gradually pushed back to their starting positions. By 5 July, the operation concluded in a VRS defensive victory.

== Aftermath ==
The failure of Operation Brana '94 ensured continued VRS control of the Vozuća–Ozren salient. Analysts cite terrain, VRS defensive preparations, and rapid reinforcement as key factors in ARBiH’s defeat. ARBiH losses and operational exhaustion prevented further major offensives until 1995. The area remained under VRS control until September 1995, when it was captured by ARBiH forces during Operation Uragan. Some of the Bosnian mujahideen who participated in Operation Brana '94 were later implicated in war crimes committed during subsequent operations, including Operation Uragan in 1995. General Rasim Delić, commander of the ARBiH, was tried by the International Criminal Tribunal for the former Yugoslavia (ICTY) and sentenced to three years in prison for his failure to prevent or punish crimes committed by forces under his command.

== Sources ==
- Central Intelligence Agency. Balkan Battlegrounds: A Military History of the Yugoslav Conflict, 1990–1995, Volume 2. Washington, D.C., 2002. ISBN 978-0-16-066472-4. Annex 54, pp. 485–500.
- Burg, Steven L.; Shoup, Paul S. The War in Bosnia-Herzegovina: Ethnic Conflict and International Intervention. M.E. Sharpe, 1999. pp. 235–238. ISBN 978-0-7656-0579-7.
- Hoare, Marko Attila. The History of Bosnia: From the Middle Ages to the Present Day. Saqi Books, 2013. pp. 302–305. ISBN 978-0-86356-713-1.
