= Gornja Maoča =

- Village
- Location within Bosnia and Herzegovina
- Coordinates: 44°43′51″N 18°37′51″E
- Country: Bosnia and Herzegovina
- Entity: Federation of Bosnia and Herzegovina
- Canton: Srebrenik

Government
  - Leader: Nusret Imamović

Area
  - Total: 7.11 sq mi (18.41 km^{2})

Population (2013)
  - Total: 195
  - Density: 27.4/sq mi (10.6/km^{2})
- Time zone: UTC+1 (CET)
  - Summer (DST): UTC+2 (CEST)

Gornja Maoča ("Upper Maoča") is a village in the municipality of Srebrenik, Bosnia and Herzegovina. It is a mountainous village located in the Majevica mountain range of northeastern Bosnia, located directly south from the village of Maoča part of Brčko municipality. The name of the village can be translated as "Upper Maoča". According to the 2013 census, its population was 195, all Bosniaks.

The village was formerly known as Karavlasi (Serbian Cyrillic: Каравласи). During World War II, 25 inhabitants were murdered. The village was populated by ethnic Serbs, and no Muslims, in the Socialist period. After the Bosnian War (1992–95) it was populated by foreign and domestic Wahhabists, the majority of whom participated in the war as members of the Bosnian mujahideen (El Mudžahid) detachment of the Army of the Republic of Bosnia and Herzegovina. It is one of the Islamist strongholds of Bosnia and Herzegovina. It was raided in 2010 by 600 policemen. Following media attention as an extremist hideout, on 2 February 2010 the village was raided by "hundreds" of police officers from 11 different law enforcement agencies. Action lasted for ten hours and resulted with "seven people" being arrested and the seizure of "some arms and ammunition", several cell phones and computers were also seized, as well as some audio and video material. Following this, the German government expressed its readiness to intensify its assistance to Bosnian government and security agencies.

== See also ==
- Ošve
- Donja Bočinja
