= Nusret Imamović =

Bosnian Salafist Islamist leader (born 1971)

Nusret Imamović (26 September 1971) is a Bosnian Islamist leader who founded the Salafist community in Gornja Maoča.

== Biography ==
Imamović was born in Lipovice near Kalesija. He studied at the Gazi Husrev-begova Medresa. During the Bosnian War from 1992 to 1995, Imaović was a member of the Bosnian mujahideen who fought for the Army of the Republic of Bosnia and Herzegovina. After the end of the war, Imamović went to the United Arab Emirates, where he earned a degree in Sharia law. After his studies, he returned to Bosnia and Herzegovina. There, he became one of the two principal leaders of the Bosnian Salafist group along with Jusuf Barčić.

For some time, he lived in Zavidovići and in 2006 moved to Gornja Maoča where he established a Salafist community. After Barčić died in a car crash in 2007, Imamović became his successor. He was briefly arrested in 2010 and released. Imamović publicly supported violence multiple times and the global jihad movement.

In 2013, he went to Syria to fight in the civil war against the Syrian government as a member of the Al-Nusra Front. The last reports state that he lives in the northern area of the Idlib Governorate in Syria. According to an unnamed Salafi source, Imamović relocated to Syria because he "couldn’t bear the constant pressure and accusations that he was a terrorist" back home in Bosnia.

The Syrian civil war divided the Salafist community in Bosnia and Herzegovina, with one side led by Imammović supporting the Al-Nusra Front, while the other, led by Bilal Bosnić supported the Islamic State.

In 2014, the United States Department of State listed Imamović on their list of most-wanted terrorists.

Imamović was included in new 15 January 2020 EU consolidated list of persons eligible for financial sanctions based on suspicion of terrorist activities.
