= Operation Miracle =

Operation Miracle may also refer to:

- Operation Miracle (Rhodesia), 1979 operation in Mozambique
- Operation Miracle (1995), operation of Bosnian mujahideen
- Operation Miracle (2021), South Korean rescue operation in Afghanistan
- Operación Milagro, Cuban government's medical humanitarian mission
