= Imamović =

Imamović is a Bosnian Muslim surname, meaning "son of the imam". It may refer to:

- Ahmed Imamović (born 1971), Bosnian film director
- Armin Imamović (born 2000), Bosnian footballer
- Damir Imamović (born 1978), Bosnian musician
- Enis Imamović (born 1984), Bosniak politician in Serbia
- Jasmin Imamović (born 1957), writer and politician from Bosnia and Herzegovina
- Mustafa Imamović (1941–2017), Bosnian historian
- Nusret Imamović (born 1971), Bosnian Islamist leader
- Zaim Imamović (musician) (1920–1994), Bosnian popular sevdalinka performer
- Zaim Imamović (officer) (1961–1995), Bosniak soldier, commanded the Army of Bosnia and Herzegovina during the 1992–1995 war

== See also ==
- Imamov, people with this surname
