= Vozuća Monastery =

Serbian Orthodox monastery in Vozuća, Bosnia and Herzegovina

Coordinates: 44.347656°N 18.330458°E

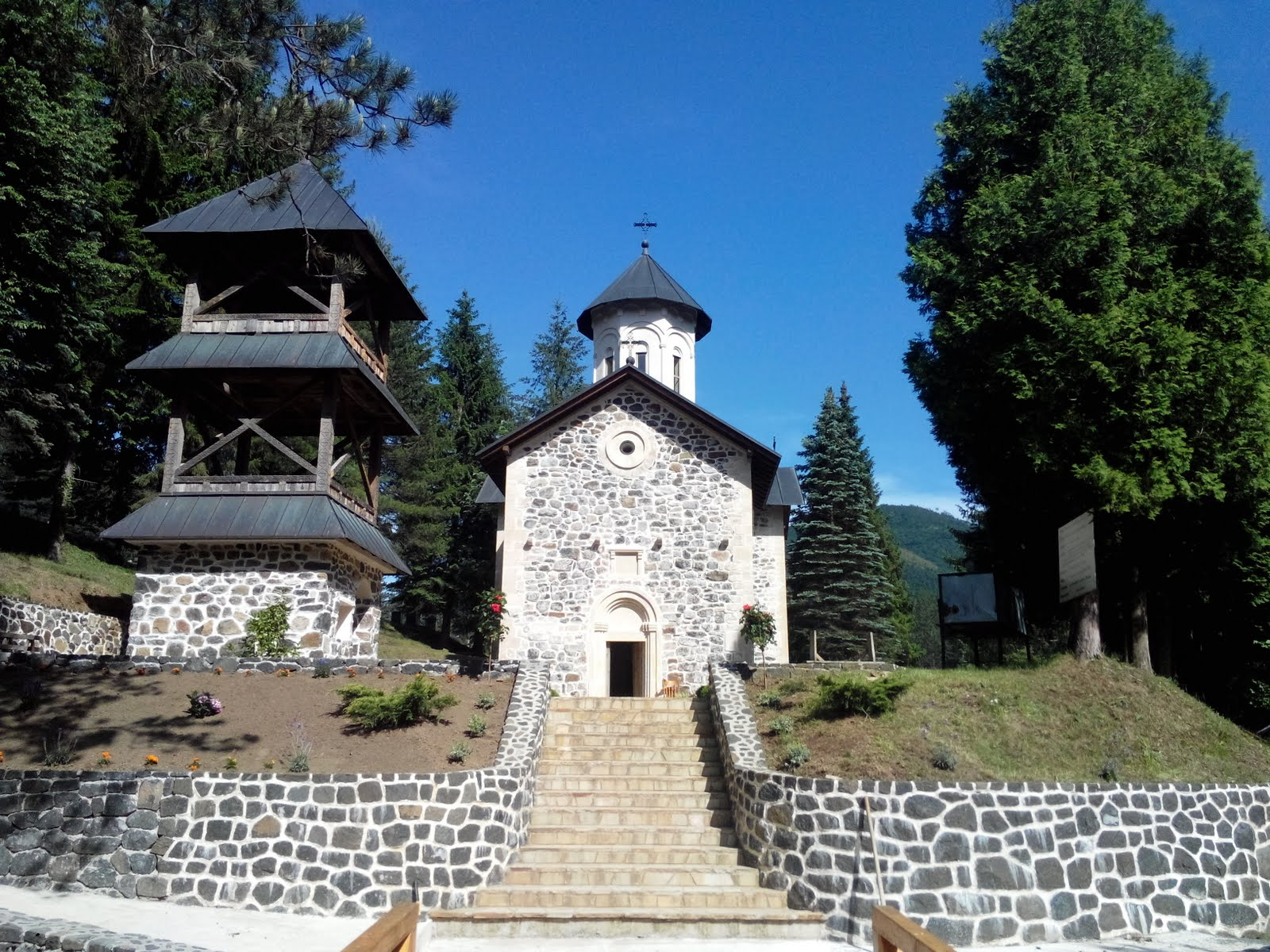
- Vozuća Monastery in 2016
- Interactive map of Vozuća Monastery

Monastery information
- Full name: Манастир Возућа
- Order: Serbian Orthodox
- Established: 16th century

Site
- Location: Vozuća
- Public access: Yes

The Vozuća Monastery (Serbian: Манастир Возућа, romanized: Manastir Vozuća) is a Serbian Orthodox monastery dedicated to the Holy Trinity and located around 5 km (3.1 mi) from the village of Vozuća in the Municipality of Zavidovići, central Bosnia and Herzegovina. Its foundation dates back to 14th century, and was first mentioned in 1617. After it was abandoned in 1690, during the Great Turkish War, it remained empty for more than a century. It was renovated two times during the 19th century, between 1856 and 1859, and in 1884. An elementary school was established at the monastery in 1858, but it was closed in 1894. That year, a wooden bell tower was built beside the monastery's church.

The monastery was badly damaged during World War II. In 1941, it was looted by forces of the Independent State of Croatia, and in 1942, the elementary school and the bell tower were burned down by the Muslim Militia. After the war, the monastery was repaired, and a new bell tower was erected in 1989. Severe damage was inflicted on the monastery at the end of the Bosnian War (1992–1995), and it was further vandalised after the war. The church remained roofless for five years. As of 2010, the monastery was still in the process of renovation. The Vozuća Monastery was designated by KONS as a National Monument of Bosnia and Herzegovina in 2004. The monastery was robbed in 2020.

== See also ==
- List of Serbian Orthodox monasteries
