= Imamov =

Imamov (Russian: Имамов) is a Slavic surname. The feminine form is Imamova (Russian: Имамова). Notable people with the surname include:

- Aliosman Imamov (1953–2025), Bulgarian politician
- Yakhyo Imamov (born 1989), Uzbekistani judoka

== See also ==
- Imamović, people with this surname
