= Gang de Roubaix =

Criminal gang in France

- Leader: Christophe Caze
- Dates active: 27 January 1996 – 29 March 1996
- Active regions: France
- Ideology: Al-Qaeda
- Status: dismantled
- Size: 18 terrorists

Gang de Roubaix was a French terrorist cell tied with the Islamist group al-Qaeda. Its members were suspected of murder, various violent bank attacks, and a failed car bombing attack against a G7 finance ministers meeting in Lille. The cell was ended when R.A.I.D. assaulted their headquarters in Roubaix in 1996.

== Background ==
In 1992, the Bosnian War (1992–1995) began in the Republic of Bosnia and Herzegovina involving three ethnic groups: Bosnian Serbs, supported by Serbia, Bosnian Croats supported by Croatia and Bosniaks. Bosniaks received some military and financial support from Muslim countries.

Among the foreigners arriving in Bosnia were Christophe Caze, a French medicine student, who began taking care of casualties in Zenica. Soon afterwards, he converted to Islam and radicalized slowly. During his stay in Zenica, he made friends with Fateh Kamel, Mohammed Omary and Lionel Dumont, members of the Bosnian mujahideen and participated in the war.

In 1995, the Bosnian War ended with the Dayton Agreement. All the mujahideen, including Caze who joined them, were asked to leave Bosnia. Then Kamel, who was working for the GIA, convinced Caze and Dumont, to commit terrorist attacks in their home countries because of the diplomatic relationships between France and Algeria.

Kamel organized counterfeited administrative documents in his home country of Canada to allow his associates to escape safely after the attacks. Meanwhile, Caze and Dumont began recruiting in Roubaix, France and went to Bosnia in order to buy heavy weaponry with financial help from Abu Hamza al-Masri in London.

== Attacks in France ==
In late 1996, the newly created cell began spreading terror. In order to fund their future attacks, they planned several criminal acts.

On 27 January 1996, some of their members, including Dumont, stole an Audi car but encountered a police patrol, who thought that they were dealing with minor criminals. Immediately, the group fired on the police with assault rifles, injuring one of the police officers who was hit twice. However, the attackers' weapons malfunctioned and the police were able to escape.

On 8 February 1996, they robbed a supermarket but had to flee when the police arrived. The ensuing chase ended with the group's car crashing. While firing on the police, they killed a Mercedes driver, Hammoud Feddal and stole his car.

On 25 March, eight members of the gang assaulted a Brink's armoured truck near a shopping mall, injuring the driver in the leg. The attackers couldn't access the money and fled.

== Dissolution ==
On 28 March 1996, the group parked a Peugeot 205, with 4 gas tanks linked to a detonator in the boot, beside a police precinct in Lille. The whole building was supposed to be destroyed by the blast. However, the bomb malfunctioned, destroying only the car.

For several days, the gang had been under surveillance after the failed assault against the Brink's truck. The police officers succeeded in locating the gang's: the house of one of the members in Roubaix.

The day following the failed attack of 28 March, the police decided to intervene. The RAID, a French anti-terrorist Special unit, surrounded and stormed the house. The four men who were inside fought back with assault rifles, screaming that they'd rather die than surrender. The RAID team fired back and launched smoke grenades. A grenade, launched by the group, injured another policeman and started a fire in the house. After several minutes of heavy gunfighting, the roof of the building, weakened by the fire, collapsed on the 3 remaining gang members. The toll of the assault was four dead and two police officers injured, including one seriously. The others members of the gang, who were located in several other locations, managed to escape. All the police units were scrambled. Several hours later, Caze, who had managed to escape, was killed by Belgian police.

== Aftermath ==
An electronic address book was found on Caze's body which permitted the arrest of Fateh Kamel and Mohammed Omary. Kamel was the leader of a terrorist cell in Montreal, suspected of planning terrorist attacks in Los Angeles.

After escaping all across Europe, Dumont was finally arrested in Germany in 2003. As of 2012 he was serving a 25-year sentence in France.
