= Al-Haramain v. Obama =

- Court: United States Court of Appeals for the Ninth Circuit
- Full case name: Al-Haramain Islamic Foundation, Wendell Belew, Asim Ghafoor v. Barack Obama, National Security Agency, Keith B. Alexander, Office of Foreign Assets Control, Adam J. Szubin, Federal Bureau of Investigation, Robert S. Mueller III
- Argued: June 1, 2012
- Decided: August 7, 2012
- Citation: 690 F.3d 1089

Case history
- Prior history: Al-Haramain v. Bush, 507 F.3d 1190 (9th Cir. 2007)

Court membership
- Judges sitting: Harry Pregerson, Michael Daly Hawkins, M. Margaret McKeown

Case opinions
- Majority: McKeown, joined by a unanimous court

Laws applied
- 50 U.S.C.S. § 1810

Al-Haramain v. Obama, 690 F.3d 1089 (9th Cir. 2012) was a case before the U.S. District Court for the Northern District of California filed 28 February 2006 by the al-Haramain Foundation and its two attorneys concerning the NSA warrantless surveillance controversy. The case withstood retroactive changes brought by the Congressional response to the NSA warrantless surveillance program.

== Background ==
In 2004 during proceedings to freeze al-Haramain Foundation, an Oregon Nonprofit Corporation, the government inadvertently gave the organization classified documents that suggest the foundation was subject to electronic surveillance. Al-Harmain and their two attorneys filed a lawsuit claiming violation of the Foreign Intelligence Surveillance Act via unlawful surveillance, based on the classified documents that the government gave Al-Harmain. The district court found that the Foreign Intelligence Surveillance Act preempted the state secrets privilege and waived sovereign immunity for damages under 50 U.S.C.S. § 1810.

== Opinion ==
On March 31, 2010, Chief Judge Vaughn R. Walker granted partial summary judgment in favor of the plaintiffs, because 50 U.S.C.S. § 1810 has no explicit waiver of sovereign immunity, and on 21 December awarded $2.5 million in attorneys' fees and about $41,000 to two of the three plaintiffs. The court affirm the dismissal of claims against Mueller.

The district court was reversed and the case was subsequently dismissed by Ninth Circuit Court of Appeals on August 7, 2012.
