= Operation Miracle (1995) =

1995 battle in Bosnia and Herzegovina

- Part of the Bosnian war
Date	July 21, 1995
Location	Krčevine, Zavidovići municipality, Bosnia and Herzegovina 44°09′55″N 17°47′30″E
Result	Bosnian Mujahideen victory

Belligerents
Bosnian Mujahideen	Republika Srpska

Commanders and leaders
Adil Al-Ghanim †	Unknown

Operation Miracle (Arabic: كرامة, also Operation Proljeće II) was a successful attack by the foreign troops of the Bosnian Mujahideen against the village of Krčevine in the Zavidovići municipality on 21 July 1995.

== The attack ==
The attack itself, carried out by the El Mujahed Detachment of the 3rd Corps, was accompanied by a photographer employed by the Mujahideen, as well as Syrian-born interpreter Aiman Awad. It was part of the larger Proljece II action, aimed at capturing Krčevine, Malovan and Malije Gaj. Operation Miracle commenced at approximately 15:30 on July 21.

Adil al-Ghanim, known by the kunya Abu Mu'adh al-Kuwaiti, was the commander of the fighters who entered the city, although he did not engage in combat himself. While observing the mission from atop a nearby hill, he was shot and killed.

A Saudi commander from Medina who was greatly disturbed by the ongoing Srebrenica massacre of Bosnian Muslims, Abu Omar al-Harbi led a six-man team whose goal was to capture three Bosnian Serb bunkers. However, the first bunker sat in front of an open field which didn't offer any cover to the team, and the Serbs immediately began firing on them as they struggled to get their rocket-propelled grenade in position. al-Harbi began sprinting across the open field towards the bunker, shooting at the two Serbs inside. His team shouted to warn him that he could be entering a minefield, but his only response was to shout Allahu Akbar loudly before carrying on. He killed one of the Serbs from a distance of approximately two metres in front of the bunker before he was shot in the forehead and killed.

During a "sabotage attack" led by Abu Sabit Masri against Serb foxholes, approximately three military police were killed and the severed head of Momir Mitrović was collected and brought back along with his identification and diary.

A Serbian tank was captured by Bosniak forces, who sent a radio message for al-Battar al-Yemeni, a former tank commander from the Army of Yemen, to return to the battlefield following his removal after being wounded in the hand. As Serb troops tried to destroy the captured vehicle, al-Yemeni and an unknown companion ran towards it and drove it back to the Bosnian lines. He was killed by a mortar shell four hours later while trying to evacuate a wounded fighter from a captured bunker.

Krsto Marinković, of the Serbian Light Brigade, was woken up in his unit's trench by shouts of coming under attack from the Bosnians. Together with Petko Marić, he ran towards the forests in an attempt to escape the attack, where they met Velibor Tošić, and at 19:00 the trio decided to surrender themselves to the Mujahideen, in the hopes of being exchanged for Bosnian prisoners. After stepping out of the forest, they were surrounded quickly by both Bosnian and foreign Mujahideen, who kicked and punched them before making a brief video showcasing their prisoners, and entrusted them to a Bosnian and two Mujahideen who began marching them towards Livade.

== The prisoners ==
=== Held in Livade cabin ===
The captured soldiers, with the exception of Predag Knežević who was allegedly beheaded, were taken to Livade village. A memo was written the following day, from the Military Security Service of the ABiH 35th Division, informing the 3rd Corps commander that the prisoners had been interviewed in the "Reception Centre" in Livade, and that they suggested that Sare, a reference to Edin Sarić, should conduct any future interrogation. They were questioned about which VRS units had been responsible for destroying mosques in Prijedor, Banja Luka and Bosanska Krupa, and the identities of those who had raped Muslim women. Eleven of the prisoners turned out to be Muslim "labour" soldiers from Prnjavor who had been employed to fortify Serb defences in the area, while Branko Sikanić, Igor Guljevatej and Velibor Trivičević were proper soldiers. By the end of the day, the total was 12 captured VRS soldiers, and 11 captured support soldiers.

=== Transferred to Kamenica ===
The prisoners were transported two days later to the Kamenica camp in the Gostović valley. Marinković tried to escape at one point, but simply fell off the back of the truck still blindfolded and bound, and a burst from a Mujahideen machine gun made him freeze. A knife was held to his throat, and the Bosnian asked the captured doctor, Branko Sikanić, to come over and slit his throat, which Sikanić refused - and the convoy carried on. When they arrived, they were untied and fed fish, bread and water.

Two soldiers from the 35th Division had heard of the capture and showed up at the two-story house where the prisoners were held, where they claim that they asked the foreign fighter to untie them, but were ignored.

The following day, 40-year-old prisoner Gojko Vujičić, who had been wounded in the right thigh, swore blasphemous curses while demanding water to be given to him, and was subsequently taken to another room where he was shot and decapitated. The remaining prisoners were forced to kiss his head before it was hung on the wall for two days. Their legs were bound with an air hose, which prisoners later stated was filled with air to cause it to inflate, causing them great pain. Other prisoners allege they were administered electrical shocks. While bathing the prisoners, the Mujahideen were again met by members of the Bosnian Army who noted that there were "about ten prisoners" who were all able to walk to the bathing area on their own, and appeared to be in good health.

=== Transferred to ZK prison ===
After a month, the prisoners were moved to Zenica Kazneno Popravni Dom prison, where they were held. Here, they were interrogated by Edin Sarić as earlier suggested, who reported that ""They were worn out. They were not shaved. They were dirty...I couldn't see visible traces of torture or violent behaviour. I think that's quite enough. And especially if each men, each of them, tells you that there was no such things, what else could I do but believe these people?", indicating that the captured soldiers had initially denied any abuse at the hands of their captors.

The eleven Muslim prisoners were released as a prisoner exchange on 31 October, while the others record being held beyond 31 December, when they were seen by the Red Cross. Other prisoners included Goran Stokanović, Šamac and a paramedic.

== Aftermath ==
Following the battle, because of the unexpected good fortune in capturing a tank, overrunning the Serb positions, and setting a new front line in the battle, the Arab forces dubbed the battle al-Karama, "The Miracle".

After the war, General Rasim Delić was accused by the International Criminal Tribunal of failing to prevent the mistreatment of the prisoners.
