= Petrovice (Kalesija) =

- Village
- Location within Bosnia and Herzegovina
- Country: Bosnia and Herzegovina
- Entity: Federation of Bosnia and Herzegovina
- Canton: Tuzla
- Municipality: Kalesija

Area
  - Total: 1.80 sq mi (4.67 km^{2})

Population (2013)
  - Total: 2,460
  - Density: 1,360/sq mi (527/km^{2})

Petrovice is a village in the municipality of Kalesija, Bosnia and Herzegovina.

== Demographics ==
According to the 2013 census, its population was 2,460.

Ethnicity in 2013
Ethnicity	Number	Percentage
Bosniaks	2,407	97.8%
Croats	1	0.0%
other/undeclared	52	2.1%
Total	2,460	100%
