= Al-Haramain Foundation =

Saudi Arabian NGO

al-Haramain Foundation
- Abbreviation: HIF
- Formation: 1988
- Dissolved: 2004
- Type: NGO
- Legal status: Foundation
- Headquarters: Riyadh, Saudi Arabia
- Region served: Worldwide
- President: Aqeel Abdulaziz Aqeel al-Aqeel
- Website: alharamain.org
- Remarks: Banned worldwide by the United Nations Al-Qaeda and Taliban Sanctions Committee, for "participating in the financing, planning, facilitating, preparing or perpetrating of acts or activities by, in conjunction with, under the name of, on behalf or in support of" Al-Qaeda.

Al-Haramain Islamic Foundation (Arabic: مؤسسة الحرمين الخيرية; AHIF) was a charity foundation, based in Saudi Arabia. Under various names it had branches in Afghanistan, Albania, Bangladesh, Bosnia, Comoros, Ethiopia, India, Kenya, Malaysia, the Netherlands, Nigeria, Pakistan, Somalia, Tanzania, and the United States, and "at its height" raised between $40 and $50 million a year in contributions worldwide. While most of the foundation's funds went to feed poor Muslims around the world, a small percentage went to Al-Qaeda, and that money (and money from other charities) was "a major source of funds" for the terrorist group. In 2003, Saudi authorities ordered Al-Haramain to shut down all overseas branches, and by 2004 Saudi authorities had dissolved Al-Haramain. However, US intelligence officials believed it had reopened branches under new names.

On 7 June 2004, the founder and former leader of AHIF, Aqeel Abdulaziz Aqeel al-Aqeel, was listed on an INTERPOL-United Nations Security Council Special Notice for being associated with Al-Qaeda, Osama bin Laden or the Taliban for "participating in the financing, planning, facilitating, preparing or perpetrating of acts of activities by, in conjunction with, under the name of, on behalf or in support of" Al-Qaeda.

In September 2004, the U.S. Department of the Treasury alleged that its investigation had found "direct links" between the foundation and Osama bin Laden. Between 2004 and 2010, fourteen branches of the charity were listed on the UN Security Council Al-Qaeda Sanctions Committee list of "individuals, groups, undertakings and other entities associated with Al-Qaeda" and subject to "sanctions measures (assets freeze, travel ban and arms embargo) imposed by the Security Council".

== History ==
The charity was founded by Shiek Aqil Abdul-Aziz Al-Aqil, a one time official in the Saudi Arabian ministry of education. In the late part of the 20th century, and the first decade of the 21st century, the Al-Haramain Islamic Foundation was the most ubiquitous Saudi charity operating in and around the conflict zones of the Arab and greater Islamic world.

Al-Haramain was established in 1988 during the fallout of the Soviet withdrawal from Afghanistan which droves a wave of refugees from the central Asian nation, many of whom ended up in refugee camps on the neighboring of Pakistan. Aqil Abdul Aziz Al-Aqil, who had experience with government through his time in the ministry of education, also had wide experience in charity and relief work from previous work experience with the Saudi Red Crescent, set up the first office of the charity in the Pakistani city of Peshawar. When the charity was shut down in 2004, Al Jazeera reported that Al-Haramain officials has said that the charity received between $45–50 million each year in donations and has spent some $300 million on humanitarian work overseas.

The Al-Haramain Islamic Foundation was founded in the Pakistani city of Karachi in 1988 with the aim of religious propagation and charity, but moved its headquarters to Riyadh in 1992. It set up a branch in Somalia in 1992 also. In September 2001 AHIF was named a Specially Designated Terrorist Entity by the US government. In 2002 the US and Saudi Arabia "jointly designated the Bosnian and Somalian branches of AHIF as financiers of terror, although as of 2008 critics have raised questions as to whether the Saudi government "actually closed the offshore branches of AHIF". According to author Jimmy Gurul, the US government had evidence that "AHIF offices and representatives operating throughout Africa, Asia, and Europe provided financial and logistical support" to groups "designated foreign terrorist organizations by the US State Department", including al-Qaeda, Egyptian Islamic Jihad, Jemaah Islamiyah, Al-Ittihad Al-Islamiya, Lashkar e-Taibah, and HAMAS.

In 2004 the US designated 11 other branches including the US branch in Ashland, Oregon. Finally, later in 2004 the US designated the entire entity, including its headquarters in Saudi Arabia. At the time of its closing, AHIF had been operating in 50 countries and employed 5,000 workers. According to Al Jazeera, Al-Haramain was among a number of Saudi-based charities accused by the United States, of “financing terrorism” after the September 11th 2001 terror attacks.

== Humanitarian and proselyting activities ==
The foundation undertook religious activities such as sponsorship of orphans, preachers, imams and teachers as well as publishing and distributing Islamic books, like translations of the Qur'an, Hadith and other religious writings in Muslim countries.

The foundation also undertook building and supervising mosques, schools, Islamic centers, scholarships for students in poor Muslim countries, organizing Shariah courses, distribution of Ramadan breakfasts and blankets in the winter. As part of its activities, the foundation also distributed food, clothes and medicine for victims of wars and natural calamities all over the world. The closure of the charity led directly to the closure of a number of orphanages supported or run by the foundation in Somalia.

== Financing terror attacks ==
=== East Africa ===
According to the Associated Press, Al-Qaeda provided funds to a suspect in the November 2002 bombing of an Israeli hotel in Kenya, using sympathizers inside Al-Haramain and other Islamic charities. A wholesale fish business financed with Al-Haramain funds used some of its profits to help the al Qaeda cell behind the August 1998 bombings of the U.S. Embassies in East Africa.

=== Indonesia ===
According to the UN Security Council Al-Qaida Sanctions Committee, the foundation funded the 2002 Bali bombings that killed over 200, mostly foreign tourists.

Using a variety of means, Al-Haramain Foundation provided financial support to Al-Qaida operatives in Indonesia and to Jemaah Islamiyah (JI). According to a senior Al-Qaida official apprehended in South-East Asia, Al-Haramain Foundation was one of the primary sources of funding for Al-Qaida network activities in the region. JI has committed a series of terrorist attacks, including the bombing of a nightclub in Bali on 12 October 2002 that killed 202 persons and wounded over 300 others.(QE.A.4.01).

=== United States ===
The U.S. branch of AHF was established in 1997. As of 2004 it had headquarters in Ashland, Oregon and an office in Springfield, Missouri. (In a 2000 US taxation form the Al-Haramain Islamic Foundation reported its "prayer houses are located in Ashland, Oregon and Springfield, Mo."

The U.S. government accused Al-Haramain Islamic Foundation of Ashland, Oregon of sending $150,000 through Saudi Arabia to fund terrorist activities and support Chechen mujahideen under the guise of humanitarian aid. It also was accused of receiving money from Osama bin Laden in August 1998 and providing funding to an American imam who attended a training camp run by a terrorist organization in Pakistan. On 19 February 2004, the assets of the U.S. branch were blocked by the US Treasury Department pending investigation, the results of which showed "direct links between the U.S. branch and Usama bin Laden". On 9 September 2004 Treasury announced "the designation" of the U.S. branch of Al Haramain along with one of its directors, Suliman Al-Buthe. The Office of Foreign Assets Control of the United States Department of the Treasury had already banned various branches of this organization at various times.

On 19 June 2008, U.S. Department of the Treasury "designated" the Al Haramain Islamic Foundation (AHF) "for having provided financial and material support to al Qaida, as well as a wide range of designated terrorists and terrorist organizations." As a consequence, an "assets held by any office of the AHF organization under U.S. jurisdiction [were] frozen and U.S. persons [were] prohibited from engaging in any transactions with AHF."

==== Al-Haramain suit ====
On 28 February 2006 the American branch of the foundation filed a lawsuit against President George W. Bush, the NSA, FBI, and several other US officials. The suit asserted that the Bush administration had circumvented the Foreign Intelligence Surveillance Act by authorizing warrantless wiretaps. They asserted that the President lacked the authority to authorize wiretaps that circumvented the Foreign Intelligence Surveillance Act. Three individuals whose conversations were intercepted, Suliman al-Buthe, Wendell Belew and Asim Ghafoor, learned of the eavesdropping when U.S. officials accidentally delivered logs of phone calls to them. Al-Buthe, who had traveled intermittently to the United States but who has always resided in Saudi Arabia, had been one of the directors of the Ashland chapter. Belew and Ghafoor were two of the Foundation's U.S. lawyers.

The foundation filed another suit in August 2007, challenging the Department of Treasury's 2004 designation of Al Haramain as a "specially designated global terrorist" and the seizure and freezing of all of its assets. In September 2011, an appeals court ruled that United States officials correctly designated the charity as supporting terrorism, but found the Treasury department's Office of Foreign Assets Control improperly seized the charity's assets using a "blocking order" to freeze them without a warrant supported by probable cause, violating the Fourth Amendment right against unreasonable seizures, and that they also violated the charity's procedural due process rights by failing to give a post-seizure explanation of the basis for the seizure.

In 2010 the charity's founder Pirouz Sedaghaty, also known as Pete Seda, was convicted of tax fraud and conspiracy against the United States for allegedly filing a false tax return in order to conceal Al-Haramain's funding of Islamic militants in Chechnya. However, his conviction was overturned by the United States Court of Appeals for the Ninth Circuit in 2013 after the court found that prosecutors had withheld exculpatory evidence, provided inaccurate summaries of classified material, and paid a key witness to testify against Seda. In August 2013, the group filed a petition with a committee of the United Nations Security Council to remove the nonprofit from its list of entities associated with al-Qaida.

In 2013, Al-Buthe (who was one of the directors of the Ashland chapter and who had been wiretapped by the US government) was taken off a United Nations list of people subject to sanctions for ties to Al-Qaeda but remained on a similar US list. His attorney Tom Nelson said the UN action is some vindication for his client, but that Al-Buthe is a victim of the post-9/11 anti-terrorism paranoia.

Thomas H. Nelson of Welches, Oregon, another Foundation lawyer, filed the lawsuit. Court records show he filed a motion to place the relevant material under seal.

On 31 March 2010, US District Court Judge Vaughn R. Walker ruled that the Bush administration should have gotten warrants for its wiretaps of Al Haramain.

In June 2020 the court dismissed the indictment and arrest warrant of Al-Buthe on motion of the United States Department of Justice, which stated that such dismissal was "in the interests of justice."

=== Balkans ===
Al-Haramain funded and supported a Bosnian mujahideen battalion in Zenica Bosnia. ImIn Albania, a member of Egyptian Islamic Jihad, Ahmad Ibrahim al-Najjar, joined al-Haramain's Tirana office in 1993. He was apprehended in Albania and extradited to Egypt in June 1998 for an attempted bombing of the Khan el-Khalili Souq (market) in Cairo in 1997.

=== Russia ===
Although not necessarily alleging attacks against civilians, the Russian FSB (Federal Security Service) accused Al-Haramain (among other charities) of operating for years in Chechnya (see Arab Mujahideen in Chechnya) and Dagestan, financing Chechen resistance against occupation . The FSB accused Al-Haramain of wiring $1 million to Chechen rebels in 1999 and of arranging to buy 500 heavy weapons for them from Taliban units. Russia designates Al-Haramain as a terrorist organization since 2003.

== Pressure to close ==
On 22 January 2004, in a joint press conference, U.S. Treasury Secretary John Snow and Adel al-Jubeir, Foreign Affairs Advisor to then Crown Prince Abdullah, called upon the United Nations Sanctions Committee to designate four branch offices of the Al-Haramain Islamic Foundation as financial supporters of terrorism. As a result, Al-Haramain was folded into the National Commission. Aqeel Al-Aqeel was then removed from his position of the chairmanship of the foundation. In 2014, Aqeel Al-Aqeel was acquitted of all charges brought personally against him by the Riyadh Appeal court, though the foundation is still banned.
