= Ošve =

Village in Maglaj, Bosnia and Herzegovina

Ošve Ошве
- Village
- Location within Bosnia and Herzegovina
- Coordinates: 44°32′59″N 18°03′36″E
- Country: Bosnia and Herzegovina
- Entity: Federation of Bosnia and Herzegovina
- Canton: Zenica-Doboj
- Municipality: Maglaj

Area
  - Total: 4.15 sq mi (10.76 km^{2})

Population (2013)
  - Total: 80
  - Density: 19/sq mi (7.4/km^{2})
- Time zone: UTC+1 (CET)
  - Summer (DST): UTC+2 (CEST)

Ošve (Cyrillic: Ошве) is a village in the municipality of Maglaj, Bosnia and Herzegovina. Prior the war, the village was predominantly inhabited by the Serbs, however the Serb population was entirely expelled during the war.

== Demographics ==
According to the 2013 census, its population was 80.

Ethnicity in 2013
Ethnicity	Number	Percentage
Bosniaks	67	83.8%
Serbs	11	13.8%
other/undeclared	2	2.5%
Total	80	100%
