= Active Islamic Youth =

Islamic organization based in Bosnia and Herzegovina

Active Islamic Youth (Bosnian: Aktivna islamska omladina) was a youth organization based in Bosnia and Herzegovina. It was active in the period following the Bosnian War. Some media reports described AIO as a front for the Saudi High Commission for Relief and the Al-Haramain Islamic Foundation. AIO was the first publisher of the Islamic magazine Saff, with an estimated circulation of 9,000.

== History ==
AIO was launched after the 1992-1995 Bosnian war by a group of young Bosnian Muslims in order to promote the Islamic teachings they learned from the Arab volunteers who fought on the Bosnian side during the war. These volunteers were Islamic missionaries who distributed Islamic literature. Some of this literature designated dozens of habits of the Bosnian Muslims that had nothing to do with Wahabi teachings, which had to be corrected. They influenced the founders of AIO, who joined the Bosnian Mujahideen during the war.

== Mission ==
AIO's mission is to awaken the religious feelings of Bosnian Muslims, a group that the organization believes had been deprived of proper Islam for too long, first by the Communist regime of the former Yugoslavia, and later by mainstream Bosnian Muslims. The AIO emphasizes that it aspires to original Islamic teachings as preached by Muhammad, and that it does not accept any revisions.

== Culture ==
AIO members are known for their atypical way of praying, and for their Middle-East-style clothes and long beards. The men do not shake hands with women, and the women wear headscarves in public.

People associated with AIO are reported to have behaved violently, including during demonstrations. Leaders of AIO are said to have made inflammatory statements in which they criticized Bosnian Muslims for accepting too many habits of their Christian neighbours. On 24 December 2002 Muamer Topalović, shot three members of a Croat returnee family in Konjic. Topalovic, who confessed to the killing, said that he wanted to act against Croats. He was sentenced to 35 years in prison. Police falsely claimed that Topalovic told them during the investigation that he was a member of AIO. AIO leaders, however, acknowledged the possibility that Topalovic might have attended some of the courses the group organized.

After 11 September 2001, Bosnian police took more interest in AIO. Some of the Arab teachers who had impressed AIO's founders were then classified as a potential threat. AIO premises were raided several times, and its finances were thoroughly audited. AIO received donations from large Saudi charities, such as the Al Haramain Foundation. In the fall of 2002, U.S. authorities declared Al Haramain a sponsor of terrorist networks and froze its assets in the United States and Bosnia and Herzegovina.

AIO then shrank, experiencing financial troubles, as many of its former donors stopped sending money because of the group's reputation.
