= Lionel Dumont =

French Muslim accused of terrorism

- Born: January 29, 1971 (age 55); Roubaix, France
- Other name: Abu Hamza
- Military Service
- Allegiance: Republic of Bosnia and Herzegovina; France
- Branch: Army of the Republic of Bosnia and Herzegovina; French Army
- Units: Bosnian mujahideen 5th Overseas Interarms Regiment; 4th Marine Infantry Regiment
- Conflicts: Bosnian War; Somali Civil War; Operation Restore Hope

Lionel Dumont (born 1971) is a former French soldier currently serving a 25-year sentence in prison. He converted to Islam after serving with peacekeepers in Somalia. He was later accused of participating in the Gang de Roubaix, which unsuccessfully tried to set a car bomb during the G7 meeting in Lille in March 1996.

== Life ==
Dumont grew up in a traditional Christian family, and attended journalism school in hopes of becoming a reporter. He dropped out of history classes in 1992, and joined the French Army. He volunteered for a peacekeeping mission in Somalia, but found himself unable to adapt to civilian life when he returned. He turned to Islam, and adopted the kunya Abu Hamza, and joined the Bosnian War on the side of the Bosnian mujahideen fighting for Islamist brigades against Serbian and Croatian forces.

== Crimes ==
Dumont was sentenced to 20 years in prison in the 1990s for the murder of a Bosnian police officer. He escaped from the Sarajevo prison where he was incarcerated and fled to Japan, where he lived quietly for a number of years, using a fake passport to enter and leave the country. He was arrested in Germany when police intercepted a parcel sent to his girlfriend, they found fake passports with his photo in one of them. Dumont was extradited to France, where he had been convicted in absentia for his role in a number of robberies and violent crimes and sentenced to 25 years on appeal.
