= Battle of Vozuća =

1995 battle between the ARBiH and VRS during the Bosnian War

Coordinates: 44°22′42″N 18°20′53″E

- Part of the Bosnian War
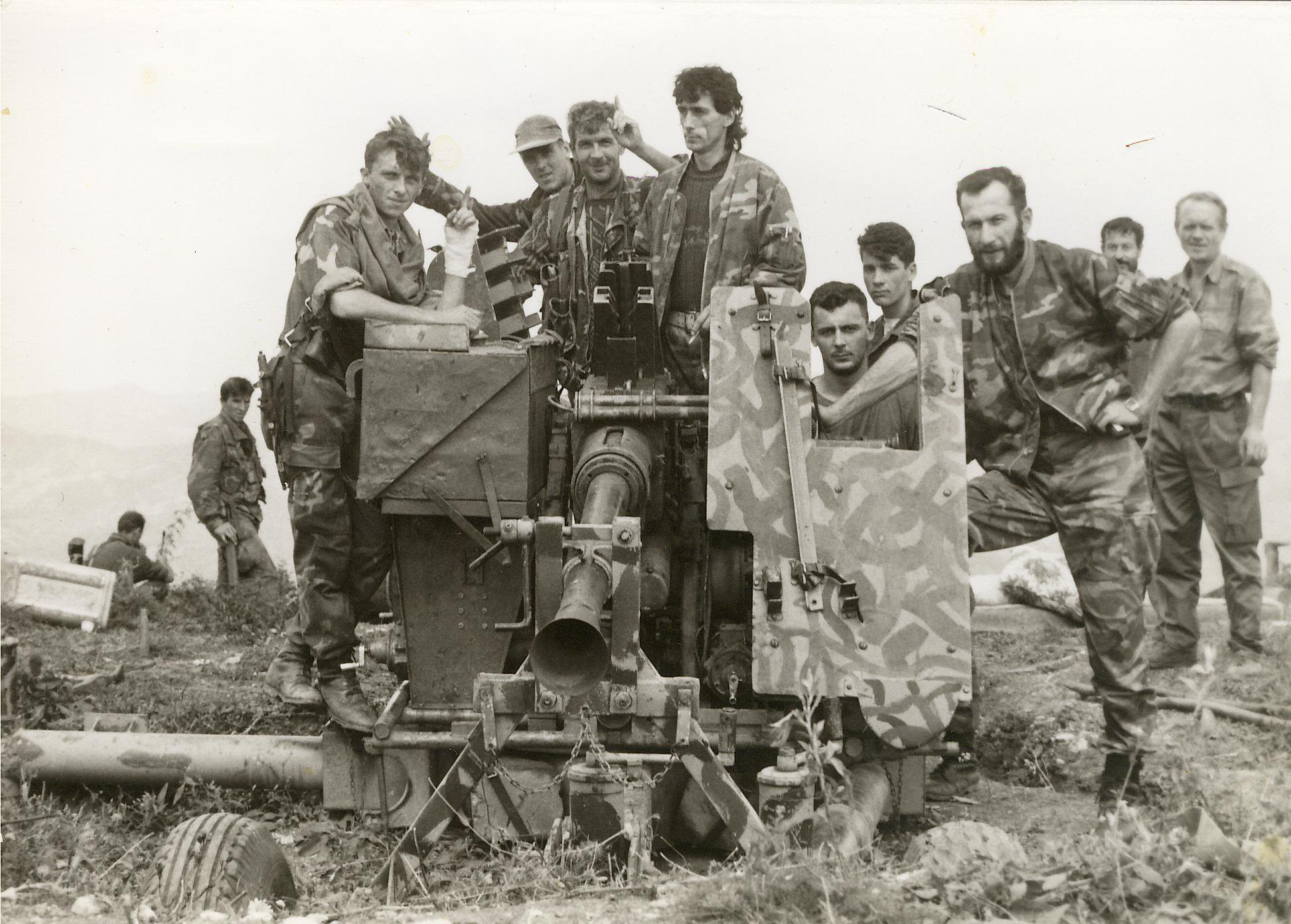
- Soldiers from the 7th Muslim Brigade posing by an anti-aircraft gun they captured from Serb forces.
Date	10 September 1995 – 11 September 1995 (1 day)
Location	Vozuća, Kamenica (Zavidovići)
Result	ARBiH victory

Belligerents
Bosnia and Herzegovina	Republika Srpska

Commanders and leaders
(Bosnia and Herzegovina) Sakib Mahmuljin; Muatez Billah †	

Strength
12,000-14,000	

The Battle of Vozuća was a military offensive fought during the final months of the Bosnian War between the Army of the Republic of Bosnia and Herzegovina (ARBiH) and the Army of Republika Srpska (VRS) in the Vozuća–Ozren area. On 10 September 1995, units of the ARBiH 2nd and 3rd Corps launched a combined offensive against VRS positions. Elements of the 21st, 22nd and 25th Divisions of the 2nd Corps and the 35th and 37th Divisions of the 3rd Corps took part in the operation. The VRS defensive lines were broken, after which ARBiH forces captured Vozuća and surrounding territory previously held by the VRS.

== The attack ==
On 10 September 1995, approximately 12,000-14,000 forces of the ARBiH 3rd Corps launched a combined offensive against VRS positions in the Vozuća–Ozren area. According to the International Criminal Tribunal for the former Yugoslavia (ICTY), elements of the 21st, 22nd and 25th Divisions of the 2nd Corps and the 35th and 37th Divisions of the 3rd Corps participated in the operation. The VRS-held defensive lines collapsed and ARBiH forces took control of Vozuća and part of the surrounding area.

The El Mudžahid Detachment, a unit of the ARBiH 3rd Corps, also participated in operations in the area. The ICTY found that by mid-1995 the detachment had been incorporated into the ARBiH command and control system, although it retained a degree of autonomy in its operations.

On 11 September, after the capture of Vozuća, approximately 60 people were captured, primarily VRS soldiers and several civilians, including three women. The captured group was initially taken to Kesten in the Zavidovići municipality, and some of the prisoners were subsequently transferred to the Kamenica camp in the Gostovići valley.

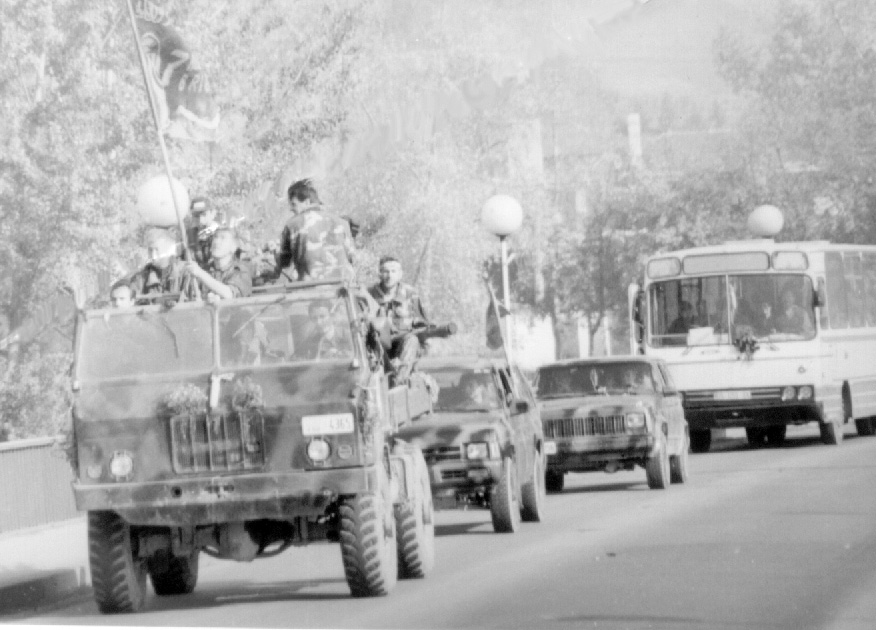
Soldiers of the 7th Muslim Brigade riding through Zenica city on September 13, after their victory.

== Outcome ==
The offensive ended with the capture of Vozuća and part of the Vozuća–Ozren area by ARBiH forces and the withdrawal of VRS units from positions they had previously held.

== Aftermath and ethnic cleansing ==
According to a commemorative Serb community, as reported by Sarajevo Times, 30 Serbian villages were burned down, and 1,920 families were expelled, escaping the fires following the battle. SRNA, the official news agency of Republika Srpska, described the event as "mass suffering," adding that a total of 7,680 people from the families were expelled. SRNA also reported that "459 soldiers of the Republika Srpska Army and civilians were killed," leaving ' a large number of people' missing, categorizing it under the wider ethnic cleansing of Serbs in the Zenica region.

=== Crimes against prisoners ===
The ICTY found that members of the El Mudžahid Detachment killed an elderly Bosnian Serb civilian and 52 captured VRS soldiers in events connected with Kesten and Kamenica in September 1995. Ten other prisoners were also subjected to mistreatment.

The prisoners held at Kamenica were subjected to severe abuse. Some victims were beheaded, while surviving detainees testified to beatings and other forms of mistreatment.

== Trial of Rasim Delić ==
Rasim Delić, commander of the Main Staff of the ARBiH, was prosecuted before the ICTY on the basis of superior responsibility for crimes committed by members of the El Mudžahid Detachment. He was not found guilty of command responsibility for the September 1995 murders and mistreatment connected with Kesten and Kamenica, because the Trial Chamber could not establish beyond reasonable doubt that he had reason to know that those specific crimes were about to be committed or had already been committed.

Delić was nevertheless sentenced to three years' imprisonment for failing to prevent or punish cruel treatment committed by members of the El Mudžahid Detachment against prisoners in other incidents during July and August 1995.

After Delić's death in 2010, the ICTY Appeals Chamber terminated the appeal proceedings and declared the Trial Chamber judgment final.

== Trial of Sakib Mahmuljin ==
Former ARBiH 3rd Corps commander Sakib Mahmuljin was also prosecuted before the Court of Bosnia and Herzegovina in connection with crimes committed by members of the El Mudžahid Detachment. In 2022, the appellate chamber found him guilty of war crimes against the wounded and sick, prisoners of war and civilians, including murder and inhumane treatment, and sentenced him to eight years' imprisonment.
