= Bilal Bosnić =

Bosnian imam

Husein Bilal Bosnić (born 1972) is a Bosnian Salafi who was convicted in 2015 of public incitement to terrorist activities and recruiting. He is known for recruiting jihadists from Europe.

== Biography ==
He was born Husein Bosnić in Bužim, northwest Bosnia in 1972, he adopted Bilal as his nickname. As a youngster he moved with his parents to Germany. He returned to Bosnia and Herzegovina during the war in 1992 and joined foreign volunteers at first, later incorporated into 7th Muslim Brigade detachment of the Army of the Republic of Bosnia and Herzegovina. After the war, Bosnić became a member of the Active Islamic Youth, and became one of the main ideological leaders of Islamic extremism in the area of former Yugoslavia.

He began to attract attention from the media for making controversial statements at public appearances. In one of his songs written in July 2011, he wrote "with explosives on our chests we pave the way to paradise" and praised "beautiful Jihad that has risen over Bosnia", while wishing that "God willing, America will be destroyed to its foundations".

He has given controversial statements at khutbahs (Friday sermons). In one of them, made in May 2007, he supported Osama bin Laden, calling him a "shahid" (martyr), adding that "he will always remain alive as he died on the Allah's path". In another khutbah made in February 2013, he called for Croats and Serbs to pay a religious tax. In his various khutbas, he also advocated for the "victory of Islam", promoting war and bloodshed. Moreover, in 2012 he called for other Muslims to join the Jihad and to defend Islam, for which he was briefly arrested and soon released.

In April 2013, he came under investigation from the police for polygamy. Bosnić lived for years with his four wives in one house. Bosnić was subject to criticism from the non-governmental organizations specialized in protecting women's rights. However, he wasn't prosecuted because he is married with only one of them. In a sermon in September 2013, Bosnić claimed that everything "from Prijedor to the Sandžak" belongs to Muslims. Bosnić is known for recruiting European Muslims for ISIL. In one of his khutbas in August 2014, he called men to defend ISIL. Though his "khutba" appeared on YouTube, Bosnić denied he ever said that.

Italian paper Corriere della Sera reported that Bosnić claimed his involvement in recruiting some of the 50 Italians from northern Italy, who joined the Islamic State. Huffington Post Italy reported on Bosnić saying to La Repubblica that the American journalist James Foley, who was beheaded by IS in August 2014, "was a spy" and called killing "justified". He said to Italian paper how "[We] Muslims believe that one day the whole world will be an Islamic state. Our goal is to make sure that even the Vatican will be Muslim. Maybe I will not be able to see it, but that time will come". According to these reports Vatican dismissed existence of security threats, while the Italian police investigated and interviewed Bosnić for claims of involvement in the recruitment but never proceeded to arrest him, no criminal charges were filed either.

For attempted recruitment and promotion of terrorism, he was arrested by the State Investigation and Protection Agency (SIPA) of Bosnia and Herzegovina on 3 September 2014, along with his 15 others in operation code-named "Damask". Prior to his arrest, Bosnić was on a tour across Scandinavia and allegedly received 100,000 marks from an unnamed Kuwait citizen. Bosnić was at first given one-month's custody, which was extended for another two months on 3 October. Finally, his custody was extended by two years because of possibility that he might influence witnesses. A day earlier, the Court of Bosnia and Herzegovina confirmed the charge against him in which he had been accused that during 2013 and 2014, as a member of the Salafi community, publicly incited other people to join terrorist organizations. The charge also said that because of his incitement, a number of Bosnia and Herzegovina's citizens, who were members of the Salafi community, left the country and joined the Islamic State. On 5 November 2015, Bosnić was sentenced to seven years in prison for public incitement to terrorist activities, recruitment of terrorists and organization of a terrorist group. In September of 2021, he was released from prison.
