= Gostovići =

- Village
- Location within Bosnia and Herzegovina
- Coordinates: 44.4180969°N 18.1567557°E
- Country: Bosnia and Herzegovina
- Entity: Federation of Bosnia and Herzegovina
- Canton: Zenica-Doboj
- Municipality: Zavidovići

Area
  - Total: 3.83 sq mi (9.92 km^{2})

Population (2013)
  - Total: 1,444
  - Density: 377/sq mi (146/km^{2})
- Time zone: UTC+1 (CET)
  - Summer (DST): UTC+2 (CEST)

Gostovići is a village in the municipality of Zavidovići, Bosnia and Herzegovina.

== Demographics ==
According to the 2013 census, its population was 1,444.

Ethnicity in 2013
Ethnicity	Number	Percentage
Bosniaks	1,421	98.4%
other/undeclared	23	1.6%
Total	1,444	100%
