= Donja Bočinja =

Village in Maglaj, Bosnia and Herzegovina

Donja Bočinja Доња Бочиња
- Village
- Location within Bosnia and Herzegovina
- Coordinates: 44°30′32.58″N 18°11′02.37″E
- Country: Bosnia and Herzegovina
- Entity: Federation of Bosnia and Herzegovina
- Canton: Zenica-Doboj
- Municipality: Maglaj

Area
  - Total: 3.41 sq mi (8.84 km^{2})

Population (2013)
  - Total: 214
  - Density: 62.7/sq mi (24.2/km^{2})
- Time zone: UTC+1 (CET)
  - Summer (DST): UTC+2 (CEST)

Donja Bočinja (Serbian Cyrillic: Доња Бочиња) is a village in the municipality of Maglaj in Zenica-Doboj Canton, Federation of Bosnia and Herzegovina, Bosnia and Herzegovina.

== Population ==
Prior to the Bosnian War, the village had Serb majority, but after the war, its Serb population was expelled and the village was inhabited by the Wahhabists with the help from the Bosnian Muslim authorities. Many of them married local women and earned citizenship. The village provided them a safe haven in which they maintained their terrorist contacts under the guise of simple farmers. However, the hostility of the inhabitants of Donja Bočinja to outsiders, including SFOR, was palpable, undermining their claims of innocence. Eventually the enclave was closed down, and the village returned to its original owners.

=== Demographics ===
According to the 2013 census, its population was 214.

Ethnicity in 2013
| Ethnicity | Number | Percentage |
|---|---|---|
| Serbs | 173 | 80.8% |
| Bosniaks | 40 | 18.7% |
| Croats | 1 | 0.5% |
| Total | 41 | 100% |
