= Vozuća =

- Village
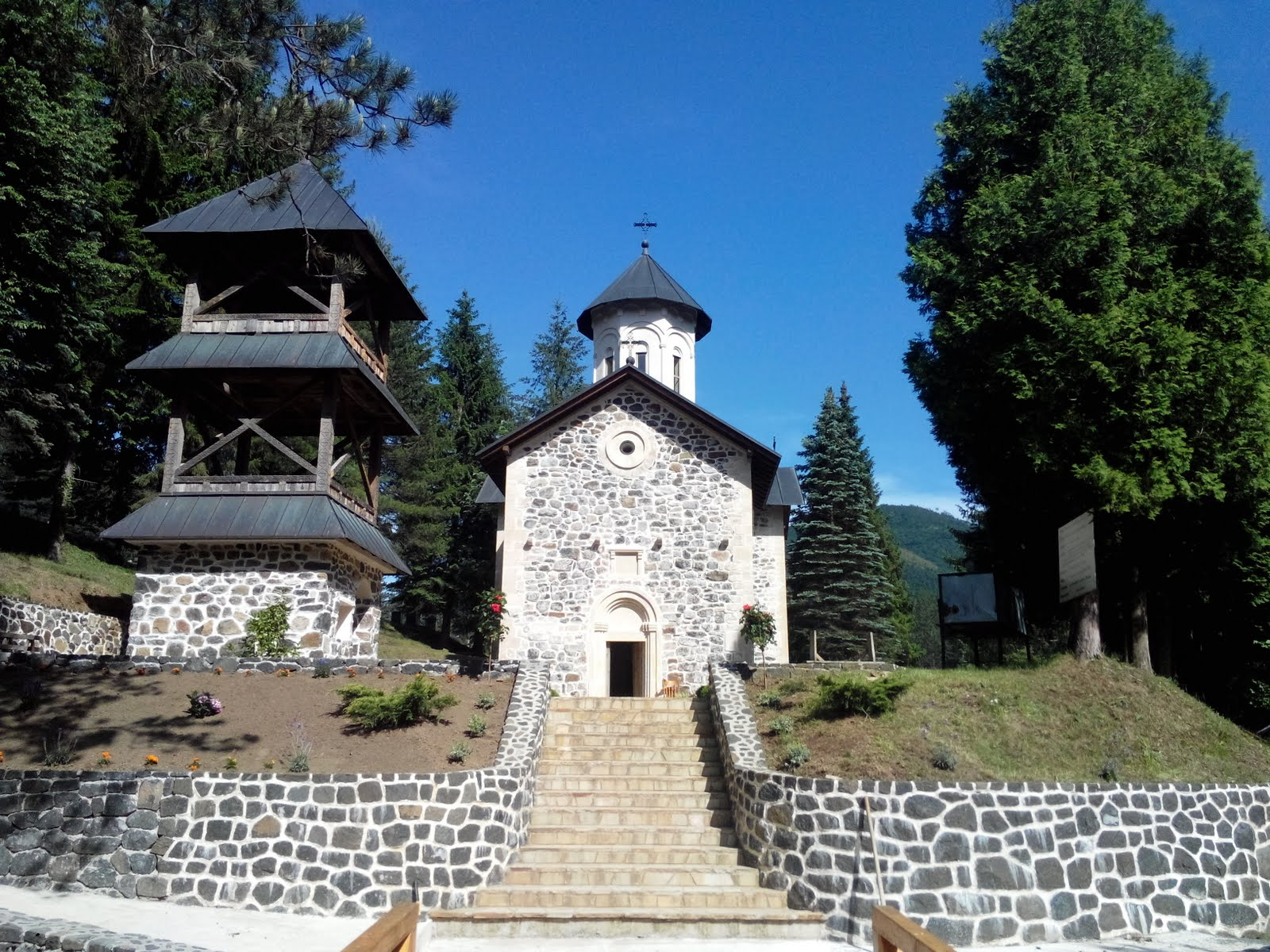
- Vozuća Monastery

- Location within Bosnia and Herzegovina
- Coordinates: 44°22′42″N 18°20′53″E
- Country: Bosnia and Herzegovina
- Entity: Federation of Bosnia and Herzegovina
- Canton: Zenica-Doboj
- Municipality: Zavidovići

Area
  - Total: 13.99 sq mi (36.24 km^{2})

Population (2013)
  - Total: 805
  - Density: 57.5/sq mi (22.2/km^{2})
- Time zone: UTC+1 (CET)
  - Summer (DST): UTC+2 (CEST)

Vozuća is a settlement in Zavidovići municipality, Zenica-Doboj Canton in Bosnia and Herzegovina, located on the river of Krivaja. The settlement is known for the Battle for Vozuća of the Bosnian War.

== Battle for Vozuća ==
The Battle for Vozuća was an attack on 10 September 1995 by the 3rd Corps of the Bosnian Army and the foreign troops of the Bosnian mujahideen against the strategically important Army of Republika Srpska-held village of Vozuća, during the Bosnian War.

The attack started and ended on 10 September, with the total victory of the Bosnian forces. Due to their planning, they were ahead of the Serb forces. The Bosnian Army and the Mujahideen got help from a special military force called the Black Swans. The aftermath of the battle is infamous for the brutal behavior of some of the Mujahedin soldiers against remaining Serb soldiers and civilians. The Bosnian forces advanced through the Ozren area.

== Demographics ==
According to the 2013 census, its population was 805.

Ethnicity in 2013
Ethnicity	Number	Percentage
Bosniaks	736	91.4%
Serbs	47	5.8%
Croats	1	0.1%
other/undeclared	21	2.6%
Total	805	100%

== See also ==
- Vozuća Monastery
