= Bosnian mujahideen =

Muslim volunteers during the Bosnian War

- Bosanski mudžahedini
- Active: 1992–1995
- Disbanded: 1995
- Country: Republic of Bosnia and Herzegovina
- Allegiance: Bosniaks
- Branch: Army of the Republic of Bosnia and Herzegovina
- Type: Infantry
- Size: 500–5,000; most estimates are in the 1,000-2,000 range (details)
- Engagements: Bosnian War: Battle of Travnik; Battle of Žepče; Operation Brana 94; Battle of Vozuća; Operation Tekbir '95; Operation Miracle

The Bosnian mujahideen (Bosnian: Bosanski mudžahedini) were a force of foreign Muslim volunteers who fought on behalf of the Republic of Bosnia and Herzegovina in the Bosnian War (1992–1995). They first arrived in central Bosnia in the latter half of 1992 with the aim of helping their Muslim co-religionists in fights against Serb and Croat forces. Initially they mainly came from Arab countries, later from other Muslim-majority countries. Estimates of their numbers vary from 500 to 5,000 with most estimates in the 1,000–2,000 range.

The republic formed in 1992 as a multi-ethnic nation, mostly of Bosniaks, Bosnian Serbs, and Bosnian Croats. Ethnic nationalists in the latter two groups founded a pair of unrecognised breakaway states within the republic's borders: Republika Srpska ("Serbian Republic"), and the Croatian Republic of Herzeg-Bosnia. Bosniaks, the majority of whom are Muslims, started being killed in ethnic cleansing operations by the two militaries, the Army of Republika Srpska and the Croatian Defence Council.

In 1995, the Bosnian War ended with the Republic of Bosnia and Herzegovina's dissolution, and the formation of Bosnia and Herzegovina.

== Bosnian War ==
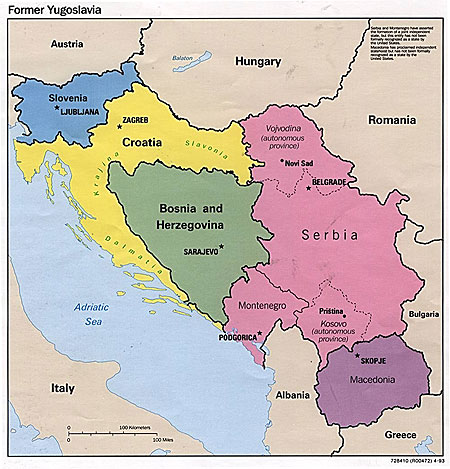
A 1993 CIA map of the recognised countries that formed out of Socialist Yugoslavia in 1992

In the breakup of Yugoslavia in 1991, Slovenia and Croatia declared independence. War broke out in Croatia between the Croatian Army and the breakaway Serb Krajina. Meanwhile, the Bosnian Muslims voted for independence. Bosnian Serbs declared an autonomous province, independent of Bosnia, and Bosnian Croats took similar steps. The war broke out in April 1992.

Muslim foreign fighters came to support the Bosnian Muslims and an independent Bosnia and Herzegovina. There were also Islamist organizations and Muslim non-profit organizations and charitable trusts that supported the Bosnian Muslims.

Volunteers arrived from all around the world, including Afghanistan, Egypt, France, Indonesia, Iraq, Iran, Lebanon, Malaysia, Morocco, Pakistan, Russia (especially around Chechnya and Dagestan), Saudi Arabia, Spain, Thailand, Turkey, the United Kingdom, the United States, Somalia and Yemen. The Bosnian mujahideen were primarily from Iran, Afghanistan and numerous Arab countries.

Foreign volunteers arrived in central Bosnia in the second half of 1992 with the aim of helping their Bosnian Muslim co-religionists to defend themselves from the Serb and Croat forces. Some originally went as humanitarian workers, while some of them were considered criminals in their home countries for illegally travelling to Bosnia and becoming soldiers. On 13 August 1993, the Bosnian government officially organized foreign volunteers into the detachment known as El Mudžahid in order to impose control and order. Initially, the foreign mujahideen gave food and other basic necessities to the local Muslim population, who were deprived of such by the Serb forces. Once hostilities broke out between the Bosnian government and the Croat forces (HVO), the mujahideen also participated in battles against the HVO alongside ARBiH units.

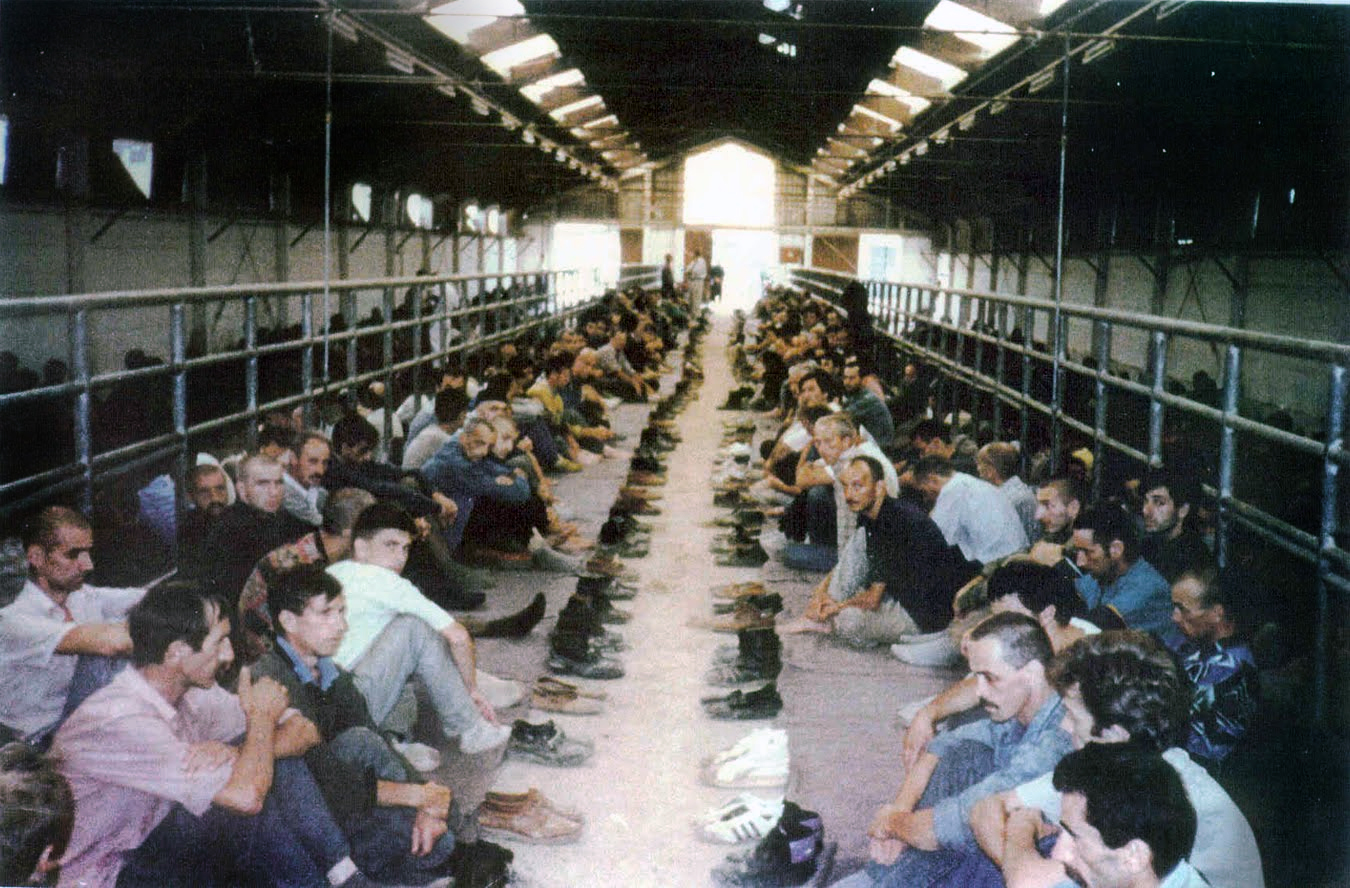
Detainees in the Manjača camp, which was made by Bosnian Serb forces to confine Bosniaks and Bosnian Croats

The foreign volunteers sometimes recruited local young men into the foreign units. Accordingly, the International Criminal Tribunal for the former Yugoslavia (ICTY) noted that it was sometimes "difficult to distinguish between the two groups". For that reason, the ICTY has used the term mujahideen (which they spell mujahedin) for both fighters from Arab countries, and also local Muslims who joined the mujahideen units.

The first mujahideen training camp was located in Poljanice next to the village of Mehurici, in the Bila valley, Travnik municipality. The mujahideen group established there included mujahideen from Arab countries as well as some Bosniaks. The mujahideen from Poljanice camp were also established in the towns of Zenica and Travnik and, from the second half of 1993 onwards, in the village of Orasac, also located in the Bila valley.

The military effectiveness of the mujahideen is disputed. However, former U.S. Balkans peace negotiator Richard Holbrooke said in an interview that he thought "the Muslims wouldn't have survived without this" help, as at the time a U.N. arms embargo diminished the Bosnian government's fighting capabilities. In 2001, Holbrooke called the arrival of the mujahideen "a pact with the devil" from which Bosnia still is recovering. On the other hand, according to general Stjepan Šiber, the highest ranking ethnic Croat in the Bosnian Army, the key role in foreign volunteers arrival was played by Tuđman and Croatian counter-intelligence with the aim to justify the involvement of Croatia in the Bosnian War and the crimes committed by Croat forces. Although the Bosnian President Alija Izetbegović regarded them as symbolically valuable as a sign of the Muslim world's support for Bosnia, they appear to have made little military difference and became a major political liability.

== Size ==
Estimates of the number of mujahideen vary. In 2003, Charles R. Shrader reported that HVO general Tihomir Blaškić had estimated 3,000 to 4,000, but the actual figure would probably be closer to 2,000, based on testimonies given in the ICTY trial against Dario Kordić and Mario Čerkez. In 2004, Evan Kohlmann stated that "the deployment of Arab fighters in Bosnia who were generally loyal to the jihadist leadership in Afghanistan exploded in the mid-1990s into numbers sometimes estimated even to exceed 5,000". Stephen Schwartz stated that "up to 6,000 “Arab Afghan” volunteers arrived in the country and enlisted in combat." In 2007, Peter Leitner put the 1995 figure as 1500-2000 In 2011, Thomas Hegghammer estimated the number of foreign Muslim fighters in Bosnia to be 1,000–2,000. In 2013, the International Crisis Group estimated that "between 2,000 and 5,000 fought in BiH." In 2017, a Center for Strategic and International Studies report stated that "figures range from 500 to 5,000 with a preponderance of estimates in the 1,000–2,000 range", citing Hegghammer for the later estimate.

== Relationship to the Bosnian Army ==
ICTY found that there was one battalion-sized unit called El Mudžahid. It was established on 13 August 1993, by the Bosnian Army, which decided to form a unit of foreign fighters in order to impose control over them as the number of the foreign volunteers started to increase. The El Mudžahid unit was initially attached to and supplied by the regular Army of the Republic of Bosnia and Herzegovina (ARBiH), even though they often operated independently as a special unit.

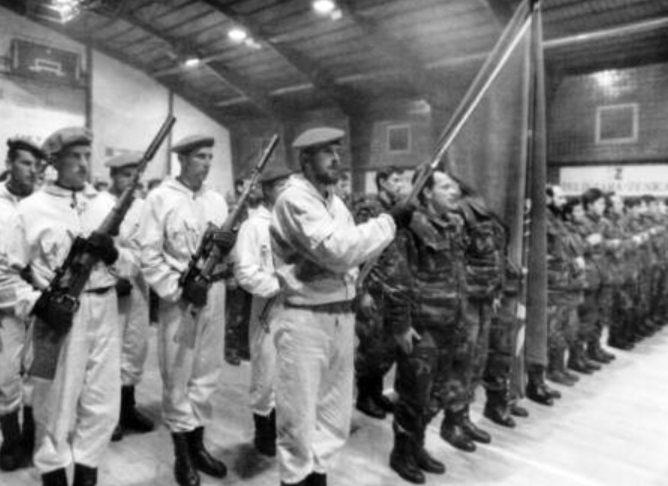
The 1992 formation ceremony of the 7th Muslim Brigade

According to the ICTY indictment of Rasim Delić, Commander of Main Staff of the Bosnian army (ARBiH), after the formation of the 7th Muslim Brigade on 19 November 1992, the El Mudžahid were subordinated within its structure. According to a UN communiqué of 1995, the El Mudžahid battalion was "directly dependent on Bosnian staff for supplies" and for "directions" during combat with the Serb forces. The issue has formed part of two ICTY war crimes trials against two former senior officials in the Army of Bosnia and Herzegovina on the basis of superior criminal responsibility. In its Trial Chamber judgement in the case of ICTY v. Enver Hadžihasanović, commander of the ARBiH 3rd Corps (who was later made part of the joint command of the ARBiH and was the Chief of the Supreme Command Staff), and Amir Kubura, commander of the 7th Muslim Brigade of the 3rd Corps of the ARBiH, the Trial Chamber found that:

the foreign Mujahedin established at Poljanice camp were not officially part of the 3rd Corps or the 7th Brigade of the ARBiH. Accordingly, the Prosecution failed to prove beyond reasonable doubt that the foreign Mujahedin officially joined the ARBiH and that they were de iure subordinated to the Accused Enver Hadžihasanović and Amir Kubura.

It also found that:

there are significant indicia of a subordinate relationship between the Mujahedin and the Accused prior to August 13, 1993. Testimony heard by the Trial Chamber and, in the main, documents tendered into evidence demonstrate that the ARBiH maintained a close relationship with the foreign Mujahedin as soon as these arrived in central Bosnia in 1992. Joint combat operations are one illustration of that. In Karaula and Visoko in 1992, at Mount Zmajevac around mid-April 1993 and in the Bila valley in June 1993, the Mujahedin fought alongside ARBiH units against Bosnian Serb and Bosnian Croat forces."

However, the ICTY Appeals Chamber in April 2008 concluded that the relationship between the 3rd Corps of the Bosnian Army headed by Hadžihasanović and the El Mudžahid detachment was not one of subordination but was instead close to overt hostility since the only way to control the detachment was to attack them as if they were a distinct enemy force.

== After the war ==
In 1995, Bosniak activists joined by a few veterans of the Bosnian mujahideen established the Active Islamic Youth, regarded as the most dangerous of the Islamist groups in Bosnia and Herzegovina.

=== Citizenship controversy ===
The foreign mujahideen were required to leave the Balkans under the terms of the 1995 Dayton Agreement, but many stayed. Although the U.S. State Department report suggested that the number could be higher, an unnamed SFOR official said allied military intelligence estimated that no more than 200 foreign-born militants actually lived in Bosnia in 2001, of whom around 30 represented a hard-core group with direct or indirect links to terrorism.

In September 2007, 50 of these individuals had their citizenship status revoked. Since then 100 more individuals have been prevented from claiming citizenship rights. 250 more were under investigation, while the body which is charged with reconsidering the citizenship status of the foreign volunteers in the Bosnian War, including Christian fighters from Russia and Western Europe, states that 1,500 cases will eventually be examined.

=== War crimes trials ===
It was alleged that Bosnian mujahideen had participated in war crimes, including the killing, torture and beheading of Serbian and Croat civilians and soldiers. No indictment was issued by the ICTY against fighters, but some Bosnian Army officers were indicted on the basis of command responsibility. Two of the indicted, Amir Kubura and Enver Hadžihasanović, were initially convicted on counts related to incidents involving the mujahideen. They were later acquitted on appeal because it could not be established that they held effective command over the fighters responsible. In the judgment, the judges concluded that the Mujahideen were responsible for execution of 4 Croatian civilians in the village of Miletići in April 1993, inhumanely treating POWs and killing one at the Orašac camp in October 1993.

The judgments in the cases of Hadžihasanović and Kabura concerned a number of events involving the mujahideen. On June 8, 1993, Bosnian Army units attacked Maljine, a Croat village. After the village was taken, a military police unit of the 306th Brigade of Bosnian Army arrived there. These policemen were tasked with evacuating and protecting the civilians in the villages taken by the Bosnian Army. The wounded were left on-site and around 200 people, including civilians and Croat soldiers, were taken by the police officers towards Mehurici. The commander of the 306th Brigade authorised the wounded be put onto a truck and transported to Mehurici. The 200 villagers who were being escorted to Mehurici by the 306th Brigade military police were intercepted by a group of mujahideens and a dozen Bosnian Army forces in Poljanice. They took prisoner at least 24 military-aged Croats and a 19 years old Croat girl who was wearing a Red Cross armband. The prisoners were taken to Bikoši, between Maljine and Mehurici. All these prisoners including the 19 years old girl were executed in Bikoši while they were being held prisoner.

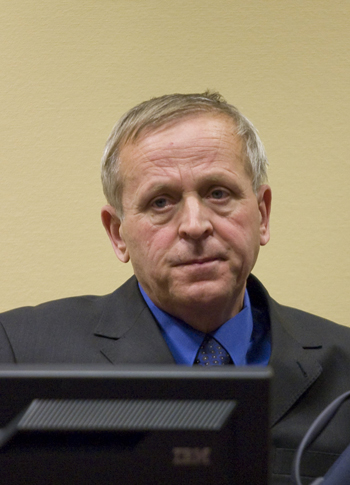
Rasim Delić

In the ICTY judgment during the trial of Rasim Delić, the judges concluded that the prosecution had proven that more than 50 Serbs captured during the Battle for Vozuća had been killed in the Kamenica camp by the mujahideen. Though the judges agreed Delić had effective control over the El Mujahideen unit, he was acquitted from responsibility since ICTY concluded he did not possess enough information to stop them. He was also acquitted from the charge of not saving 24 imprisoned Croat POWs and 19 years old Croat girl Ana Pranješ from being executed by the mujahideen since the prosecution could not prove he had already assumed the position of Chief of Staff of the ARBiH to which he had been appointed on the same day. The judges concluded that the prosecution had proven that the mujahideen from July to August 1995 had treated 12 Serbian POWs detained first in the village of Livada and then the Kamenica camp, inhumanely and had killed three of them. Delić was sentenced to three years in prison for not stopping it.

In 2015, former Human Rights Minister and Vice President of BiH Federation Mirsad Kebo talked about numerous war crimes committed against Serbs by mujahideen in Bosnia and their links with current and past Muslim officials including former and current presidents of federation and presidents of parliament based on war diaries and other documented evidence. He gave evidence to the BiH federal prosecutor. Kebo also accused Šefik Džaferović who at that time was a police commander of Zenica, and others, of deliberately hiding the war crimes. The SDA party denounced his accusations as "lies and cheap fabrications." The prosecutors investigating Džaferović decided to drop the investigation after examining documents sent by Kebo.

An Iraqi mujahideen, Abduladhim Maktouf, was convicted of helping his compatriots to abduct Croat civilians of Travnik in 1993. He was ultimately given a prison term of three years.

In 2016, former Bosnian Army Third Corps commander Sakib Mahmuljin was put on trial for having failed to prevent the murders and torture of Bosnian Serbs by members of the Mujahideen unit in the Vozuća and Zavidovići areas. According to the indictment, 50 Serb prisoners of war were killed and several were decapitated. He was sentenced to 10 years in first instance in January 2021.

=== Links to al-Qaeda ===
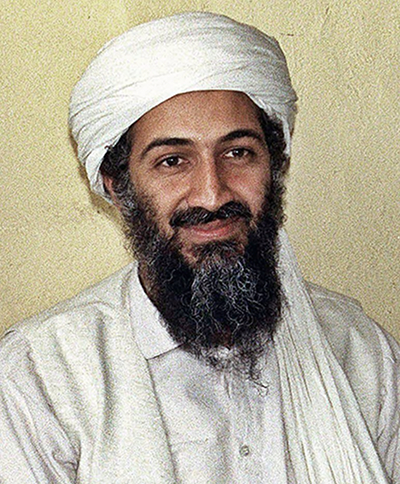
Osama bin Laden

U.S. intelligence and phone calls intercepted by the Bosnian government show communication between groups in the Bosnian mujahideen and the militant organization al-Qaeda, which was led by Osama bin Laden. Bin Laden sent those groups resources. Two 9/11 hijackers, childhood friends Khalid al-Mihdhar and Nawaf al-Hazmi, had been Bosnian mujahideen. Nasser bin Ali al-Ansi, a senior leader of the Al-Qaeda in the Arabian Peninsula, had fought in Bosnia in 1995. Bosnian Salafi leader and mujahideen veteran Bilal Bosnić was in 2015 sentenced to seven years in prison for public incitement to terrorist activities, recruitment of terrorists to fight with ISIS in Syria.

In a 2005 interview with U.S. journalist Jim Lehrer, Richard Holbrooke said:

There were over 1,000 people in the country who belonged to what we then called mujahideen freedom fighters. We now know that that was al-Qaeda. I'd never heard the word before, but we knew who they were. And if you look at the 9/11 hijackers, several of those hijackers were trained or fought in Bosnia. We cleaned them out, and they had to move much further east into Afghanistan. So if it hadn't been for Dayton, we would have been fighting the terrorists deep in the ravines and caves of Central Bosnia in the heart of Europe.

Evan Kohlmann wrote: "Some of the most important factors behind the contemporary radicalization of European Muslim youth can be found in Bosnia-Herzegovina, where the cream of the Arab mujahideen from Afghanistan tested their battle skills in the post-Soviet era and mobilized a new generation of pan-Islamic revolutionaries". He also noted that Serbian and Croatian sources about the subject are "pure propaganda" based on their historical hatred for Bosniaks "as Muslim aliens in the heart of Christian lands".

According to the Radio Free Europe, Bosnia is no more related to the potential terrorism than any other European country. In 2007, Juan Carlos Antúnez in an analysis of the phenomenon of Wahhabism in Bosnia concluded that despite Bosnian Serb and Serbian media inflated and often fictitious reports on risk of terrorism and existence of terrorist cells, the risk of a terrorist attack in Bosnia and Herzegovina 'is not higher than in other parts of the world'.

== Notable members ==
- Abdelkader Mokhtari–Abu el-Ma'ali (d. 2015), Algerian;
- Karim Said Atmani (N/A), Moroccan;
- Khalid al-Mihdhar (1975–2001), Saudi; Al Qaeda member and 9/11 hijacker
- Fateh Kamel (b. 1961), Algerian; later found guilty of support of terrorism charges in France
- Zuher al-Tbaiti (N/A), Saudi; later found guilty of terrorism charges in Morocco
- Babar Ahmad (b. 1974), Briton; tried in the US
- Lionel Dumont (b. 1971), French
- Aimen Dean (b. 1978), Saudi Arabian former al-Qa'ida member and MI6 spy

== See also ==
- 7th Muslim Brigade
- Gang de Roubaix
- Foreign fighters in the Bosnian War

== Sources ==
- Lebl, Leslie S. (2014). Islamism and Security in Bosnia-Herzegovina (PDF). Strategic Studies Institute. pp. 21, 26. ISBN 978-1584876229. Archived from the original (PDF) on 2017-03-02.
- Deliso, Christopher (2007). The Coming Balkan Caliphate: The Threat of Radical Islam to Europe and the West. Greenwood Publishing Group. ISBN 978-0-275-99525-6.
- Kohlmann, Evan (2004). Al-Qaida's Jihad in Europe: The Afghan-Bosnian Network. Berg Publishers. ISBN 978-1-85973-802-3.
- Schwartz, Stephen (2004). "Wahhabism and al-Qaeda in Bosnia-Herzegovina". Terrorism Monitor. 2 (20). Jamestown Foundation.
- Zosak, Stephanie. "Revoking citizenship in the name of counterterrorism: the citizenship review commission violates human rights in Bosnia and Herzegovina." Nw. UJ Int'l Hum. Rts. 8 (2009): 216
- Moghadam, Assaf (2011). The Globalization of Martyrdom: Al Qaeda, Salafi Jihad, and the Diffusion of Suicide Attacks. JHU Press. ISBN 9781421400587.
- Shrader, Charles R. (2003). The Muslim-Croat Civil War in Central Bosnia: A Military History, 1992-1994. Texas A&M University Press. ISBN 978-1-58544-261-4.
- Innes, Michael A. (2006). Bosnian Security After Dayton: New Perspectives. Routledge. pp. 157–. ISBN 978-1-134-14872-1.
- Farmer, Brian R. (2010). Radical Islam in the West: Ideology and Challenge. McFarland. ISBN 978-0-7864-6210-0.
- Berger, J. M. (2011). Jihad Joe: Americans Who Go to War in the Name of Islam. Potomac Books, Inc. pp. 55–. ISBN 978-1-59797-693-0.
- Curtis, Mark (2010). Secret Affairs: Britain's Collusion with Radical Islam. Profile Books. ISBN 978-1-84668-763-1.
- Hegghammer, Thomas (2011). "The Rise of Muslim Foreign Fighters: Islam and the Globalization of Jihad" (PDF). International Security. 35 (3). MIT Press: 53–94. doi:10.1162/ISEC_a_00023. S2CID 40379198.
- Donnelly, Maria Galperin; Sanderson, Thomas M.; Fellman, Zack (2017). "Foreign Fighters in History" (PDF). Web Services. Center for Strategic and International Studies.
- Schindler, John R. (2007). Unholy Terror: Bosnia, Al-Qa'ida, and the Rise of Global Jihad. New York City: Zenith Press. ISBN 9780760330036.
