= Foreign fighters in the Bosnian War =

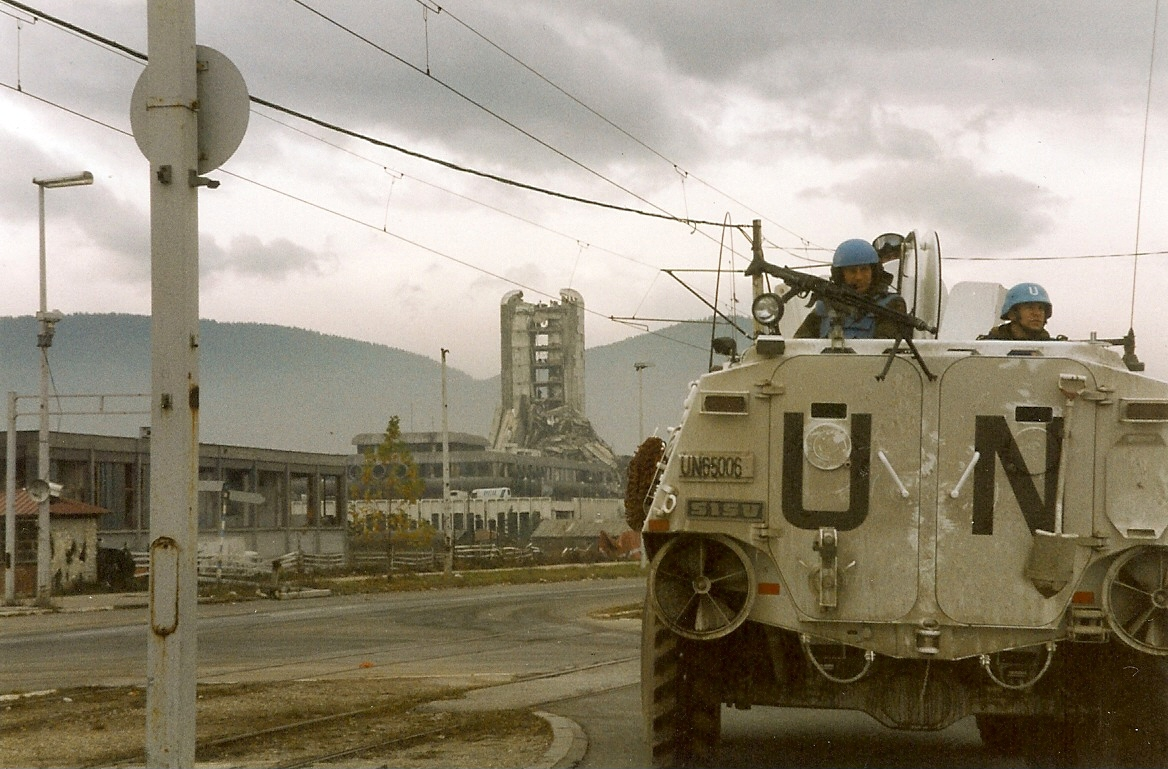
UN troops on their way up "Sniper Alley" in Sarajevo

During the Bosnian War the region attracted large amounts of foreign fighters from around the world. Volunteers came to fight for a variety of reasons including religious or ethnic loyalties, or simply for money. Generally, Bosniaks received support from Muslim countries, Serbs from Eastern Orthodox countries, and Croats from Catholic countries. The numbers, activities and significance of the foreign fighters were often misrepresented. However, none of these groups constituted more than five percent of any of the respective armies' total manpower strength.

== Bosnian efforts ==
Volunteer Muslim fighters in the Bosnian mujahideen were primarily from Afghanistan and Arab countries, though Muslim volunteers arrived from all around the world, including Asia, North Africa and Europe. Estimated numbers varied wildly, depending on sources number vary from 500 to 4,000. The military effectiveness of the mujahideen is disputed. Although, former U.S. Balkans peace negotiator Richard Holbrooke said in an interview that he believed the Bosnian Muslims wouldn't have survived without foreign help, as at the time a U.N. arms embargo uniquely diminished the Bosnian government's fighting capabilities - he called the arrival of the mujahideen "a pact with the devil" from which Bosnia still is recovering. On the other hand, according to general Stjepan Šiber, the highest ranking ethnic Croat in the Bosnian Army, the key role in foreign volunteers arrival was played by Tuđman and Croatian counter-intelligence with the aim to justify the involvement of Croatia in the Bosnian War and the crimes committed by Croat forces. Although the Bosnian President Alija Izetbegović regarded them as symbolically valuable as a sign of the Muslim world's support for Bosnia, they appear to have made little military difference and became a major political liability.

Some originally came as humanitarian aid workers, while others were escaping criminal charges in their own home countries, or came to be prosecuted for illegally departing to a foreign country and becoming soldiers. They arrived to the region of Central Bosnia in the second half of 1992. From that point on, these fighters operated independently, with little to no coordination with the ARBiH, until the winter of 1993-94 Initially, the foreign mujahideen gave food and other basic necessities to the local Muslim population, who were deprived of such by the Serb forces. They sometimes attempted to recruit some local young men, though with limited success, offering them military training, uniforms and weapons. As a result, some locals joined in. Despite this, these foreigners made local Bosniak Muslims upset.

Those who accepted to join imitated the foreigners in both dress and behavior, to such an extent that it was sometimes, according to the ICTY documentation in subsequent war crimes trials, "difficult to distinguish between the two groups". For that reason, the ICTY has used the term "Mujahideen" regardless of who joined the unit. Once hostilities broke out between the Bosnian government and the Croat forces (HVO), they participated in some confrontations.

The first mujahideen training camp was located in Poljanice next to the village of Mehurici, in the Bila valley, Travnik municipality. The mujahideen group established there included mujahideen from Arab countries as well as some locals. The mujahideen from Poljanice camp were also established in the towns of Zenica and Travnik and, from the second half of 1993 onwards, in the village of Orasac, also located in the Bila valley. In order to impose some control and order, the Bosnian government decided to incorporate organized foreign volunteers into the El Mudžahid unit on 13 August 1993. ICTY found that there was one battalion-sized unit called El Mudžahid (El Mujahid). It was established on 13 August 1993, by the Bosnian Army, which decided to form a unit of foreign fighters in order to impose control over them as the number of the foreign volunteers started to increase. The El Mudžahid unit was initially attached to and supplied by the regular Army of the Republic of Bosnia and Herzegovina (ARBiH), even though they often operated independently as a special unit. Following the end of the Bosnian War, in a 2005 interview with U.S. journalist Jim Lehrer, Holbrooke stated that "There were over 1,000 people in the country who belonged to what we then called Mujahideen freedom fighters. We now know that that was al-Qaida. I'd never heard the word before, but we knew who they were. And if you look at the 9/11 hijackers, several of those hijackers were trained or fought in Bosnia. We cleaned them out, and they had to move much further east into Afghanistan. So if it hadn't been for Dayton, we would have been fighting the terrorists deep in the ravines and caves of Central Bosnia in the heart of Europe." Two of the five 9/11 hijackers, childhood friends Khalid al-Mihdhar and Nawaf al-Hazmi, had been Bosnian mujahideen.

=== Consequences ===
The foreign mujahideen were required to leave the Balkans under the terms of the 1995 Dayton Agreement, but a few stayed. The U.S. State Department and SFOR official from allied military intelligence estimated that no more than 200 foreign-born militants actually stayed and lived in Bosnia in 2001. In September 2007, 50 of these individuals had their citizenship status revoked. Since then 100 more individuals have been prevented from claiming citizenship rights. 250 more were under investigation, while the body which is charged to reconsider the citizenship status of the foreign volunteers in the Bosnian War, including Christian fighters from Russia and Western Europe, states that 1,500 cases will eventually be examined.

During the Bosnian war, instances of Mujahideen units perpetrating war crimes, including the killing, torture and beheading of Serbian and Croat civilians and soldiers have been documented. However no indictment was issued by the ICTY's investigators and prosecutors against them. Two Bosnian Army commanding officers were indicted on the basis of command responsibility. The indictment in the cases of Bosnian Army officers Amir Kubura and Enver Hadžihasanović concerned a number of events involving the mujahideen. Both were ultimately acquitted on all counts related to the incidents involving the mujahideen. However, Hadžihasanović served two years after it was found that Bosnian units under his command had abused prisoners. In the judgment, the judges concluded that the Mujahideen were responsible for execution of 4 Croatian civilians in the village of Miletići in April 1993, inhumanely treating POWs and killing one at the Orašac camp in October 1993, damaged and vandalized the Guča Gora Monastery in June 1993 and also the Church of St. John the Baptist in Travnik.

During the trial of Rasim Delić, the judges concluded that the prosecution had proven that more than 50 Serbs captured during the Battle for Vozuća had been killed in the Kamenica camp by the Mujahideen. Though the judges agreed Delić had effective control over the El Mujahideen unit, he was acquitted from its responsibility since ICTY concluded that he didn't possess enough information to stop them. He was also acquitted from the charge of not saving 24 Croat POWs from being executed and injured by the Mujahideen since the prosecution couldn't prove he had already assumed the position of Chief of Staff of the ARBiH to which he was appointed to the same day. The judges concluded that the prosecution had proven that the Mujahideen from July to August 1995 had treated 12 Serbian POWs detained first in the village of Livada and then the Kamenica camp, inhumanely and had killed three of them. Delić was sentenced to three years in prison for not stopping it. An Iraqi mujahideen Abduladhim Maktouf was convicted for abducting Croat civilians of Travnik in 1993. He was ultimately handed a prison term of three years.

According to the indictment of Rasim Delić, Commander of Main Staff of the Bosnian army (ARBiH) at the time, after the formation of the 7th Muslim Brigade on 19 November 1992, the prosecution tried to prove that battalion was subordinated within its structure. According to a UN communiqué of 1995, the battalion was "directly dependent on Bosnian staff for supplies" and for "directions" during combat with the Serb forces. The issue has formed part of two ICTY war crimes trials against two aforementioned Kubura and Hadžihasanović on the basis of superior criminal responsibility. The Trial Chamber judgement in the case of ICTY v. Enver Hadžihasanović and Kubura, commander of the ARBiH 3rd Corps and commander of the 7th Muslim Brigade of the 3rd Corps of the ARBiH, found that the foreign mujahedin were not officially part of the 3rd Corps or the 7th Brigade of the ARBiH. Accordingly, the Prosecution failed to prove beyond reasonable doubt that the foreign mujahedin officially joined the ARBiH and that they were de iure subordinated to the accused Hadžihasanović and Kubura. At the end, the final judgement of the ICTY Appeals Chamber in April 2008 concluded that the relationship between the 3rd Corps of the Bosnian Army headed by Hadžihasanović and the El Mudžahid detachment was not one of subordination but was instead close to overt hostility since the only way to control the detachment was to attack them as if they were a distinct enemy force.

In 2016, former Bosnian Army Third Corps commander Sakib Mahmuljin was put on trial for having failed to prevent the murders, torture and beheading of some 50 Bosnian Serbs by members of the Mujahideen unit in the Vozuća and Zavidovići areas. Part of Rasim Delić's judgement also dealt with the Vozuća case, though he was acquitted for those counts. Mahmuljin was found guilty and was sentenced to 10 years in first instance in January 2021.

=== Propaganda and political abuse ===
According to ICTY verdicts, Serb propaganda was very active, constantly propagating false information about the foreign fighters in order to inflame anti-Muslim hatred among Serbs. After the takeover of Prijedor by Serb forces in 1992, Radio Prijedor propagated Serb nationalistic ideas characterising prominent non-Serbs as criminals and extremists who should be punished. One example of such propaganda was the derogatory language used for referring to non-Serbs such as "Mujahedin", "Ustaše" or "Green Berets". The ICTY concluded in the Milomir Stakić verdict that, Mile Mutić, the director of the local paper Kozarski Vjesnik and the journalist Rade Mutić regularly attended meetings with high ranking Serb politicians and local authorities in order to be informed about the next steps for spreading propaganda.

Another example of propaganda about "Islamic holy warriors" is presented in the ICTY Kordić and Čerkez verdict for war crimes and crimes against humanity committed by Croatian Community of Herzeg-Bosnia leadership against Bosniak civilians. According to verdict Gornji Vakuf was attacked by Croatian Defence Council (HVO) in January 1993 followed by heavy shelling of the town by Croat artillery. During cease-fire negotiations at the Britbat HQ in Gornji Vakuf, Colonel Andrić, representing the HVO, demanded that the Bosnian forces lay down their arms and accept HVO control of the town, threatening that if they did not agree he would flatten Gornji Vakuf to the ground. The HVO demands were not accepted by the Bosnian Army and the attack continued, followed by massacres on Bosnian Muslim civilians in the neighbouring villages of Bistrica, Uzričje, Duša, Ždrimci and Hrasnica. The shelling campaign and the attacks during the war resulted in hundreds of injured and killed, mostly Bosnian Muslim civilians. Although Croats often cited it as a major reason for the attack on Gornji Vakuf in order to justify attacks and massacres on civilians, the commander of the UN Britbat company claimed that there were no Muslim "holy warriors" in Gornji Vakuf and that his soldiers did not see any.

With the rise of ISIL during 2014, the contemporary examples with high-profile public and political individuals and civil servants involved in perpetuating unsubstantiated claims are noteworthy, such as Austrian Foreign Minister (now chancellor) Sebastian Kurz, Czech President Milos Zeman, or Croatia's President Kolinda Grabar-Kitarović who stated in 2017 that "Bosnia and Herzegovina is hub of Islamic terrorism with more than 10,000 armed Islamists". This statement prompted Croatian media to adopt the alleged "terrorists in Bosnia" narrative as an ongoing theme at the time, even going so far to plant weapons inside of mosques in order to procure them as evidence of Bosnia's supposed growing "Islamists" within the country. Such claims were dismissed by Bosnian officials and local Islamic religious authorities, with Bosnia's Security Minister Dragan Mektić (who is an ethnic Serb) being the most vocal, even telling the media that there was a possibility of para-secret service agencies staging a bogus terrorist act in order to legitimize false claims of increased Islamic radicalism in Bosnia.

== Serbian efforts ==
The Bosnian Serbs received volunteers from Orthodox Christian countries such as Russia and Greece. These included hundreds of Russians, around 100 Greeks, and some Ukrainians and Romanians. Apart from the Orthodox volunteers, Polish volunteers also participated on the Serbian side. One Japanese volunteer is documented. According to ICTY documents, volunteers from Russia, Greece, and Romania fighting for the Army of Republika Srpska (VRS) numbered between 500 and more than 1,500. Other estimates vary, while some estimate from 529 to 614, others claim that the number is well over 1,000 volunteers from Orthodox countries. Michael Innes writes that in April 1994 the VRS consisted of 100,000 men, out of whom 1,000–1,500 were mercenaries from Russia, Ukraine and Bulgaria. Journalist Ljiljana Bulatović claimed that 49 Russians were killed in the war. Mikhail Polikarpov, a historian and participant in the war, numbered Russian soldiers at the hundreds, about 40 of whom died and 20 were injured. These Greek and Russian mercenaries fought for some 200 German marks monthly.

Russian forces consisted of two organized units known as "РДО-1" and "РДО-2" (РДО stands for "Русский Добровольческий Отряд", which means "Russian Volunteer Unit"), commanded by Yuriy Belyayev and Alexander Zagrebov, respectively. РДО-2 was also known as "Tsarist Wolves", because of the monarchist views of its fighters. Another unit of Russian volunteers was composed of hundreds of cossacks, known as the "First Cossack Sotnia". All these units were operating mainly in Eastern Bosnia along with VRS forces from 1992 up to 1995.

In May 1995, the Herzegovina Corp of the VRS intended to organize an international brigade of their own in eastern Bosnia which gathered between 150 and 600. The Greek Volunteer Guard, who were organized in March 1995 with around 100 soldiers, were reported to have taken part in the Srebrenica Massacre, with the Greek flag being hoisted in Srebrenica after the town fell to the Serbs and organized systemic executions had begun.

== Croatian efforts ==
The Croats received support from Croatia and the Croatian Army fought with the local Croatian Defense Council (HVO) forces. Some external fighters included British volunteers as well as other individuals from Catholic countries who fought as volunteers. Albanian, Dutch, Spanish, Irish, Polish, French, Swedish, Hungarian, Danish and Norwegian, Canadian and Finnish volunteers were organized into the Croatian 103rd (International) Infantry Brigade. British, French, Czech, Canadian served in the 108 Brigade of HVO; and one for the French, the "groupe Jacques Doriot". Many extreme right volunteers from Western Europe, mainly from Germany, joined the Croatian Defence Forces (HOS). Although Russians mainly volunteered on the Serb side, the small neo-Nazi "Werewolf" unit fought on the Croat side. Swedish Jackie Arklöv fought in Bosnia and was later charged with war crimes upon his return to Sweden. Later he confessed he committed war crimes on Bosniak civilians in the Croatian camps Heliodrom and Dretelj as a member of Croat forces.

== Notable people ==
- Abdelkader Mokhtari, Algerian, Mujahideen
- Karim Said Atmani, Moroccan, Mujahideen
- Abu Khayr al-Masri, Egyptian, Mujahideen
- Khalid al-Mihdhar, Saudi, Mujahideen
- Abdul Manaf Kasmuri 'Abdic Manaf', Malaysian, Mujahideen
- Jackie Arklöv, Swedish, HVO
- Roland Bartetzko, German, HVO, KLA
- Masaki Takabe, Japanese, HVO
- Thomas Crowley, Irish, HOS †
- Igor Strelkov, Russian, VRS
- Yon Fon Lu, Japanese, VRS
- Evgeni Vasilev, Bulgarian, VRS
- Mieczysław Szuliński, Polish, VRS

== See also ==
- Foreign support in the Bosnian War
- Foreign fighters in the Croatian War of Independence

== Annotations ==
1. ICG estimated 2,000–5,000 foreign Muslim fighters. CSIS notes that estimations range from 500–5,000, but mostly 1,000–2,000. Charles R. Shrader estimated up to 4,000. J. M. Berger estimated 1,000–2,000. Michael Innes puts the figure at 3,000 foreign Islamic fighters.

== Sources ==
- "Bosnia", Foreign Fighters, CSIS, archived from the original on 2017-10-26
- International Crisis Group (26 February 2013). "Bosnia's Dangerous Tango: Islam and Nationalism" (PDF). Archived from the original (PDF) on 6 February 2015.
- Berger, J. M. (2011). Jihad Joe: Americans Who Go to War in the Name of Islam. Potomac Books, Inc. ISBN 978-1-59797-693-0.
- Cory-Jones, Keith (2011). War Dogs: British Mercenaries in Bosnia Tell Their Own Story. Random House. pp. 137–. ISBN 978-1-4464-9290-1.
- Curtis, Mark (2010). Secret Affairs: Britain's Collusion with Radical Islam. Profile Books. ISBN 978-1-84668-763-1.
- Innes, Michael A. (2006). Bosnian Security After Dayton: New Perspectives. Routledge. pp. 157–. ISBN 978-1-134-14872-1.
- Kohlmann, Evan (2004). Al-Qaida's Jihad in Europe: The Afghan-Bosnian Network. Berg Publishers. ISBN 978-1-85973-802-3.
- Moghadam, Assaf (2011). The Globalization of Martyrdom: Al Qaeda, Salafi Jihad, and the Diffusion of Suicide Attacks. JHU Press. ISBN 9781421400587.
- Shrader, Charles R. (2003). The Muslim-Croat Civil War in Central Bosnia: A Military History, 1992-1994. Texas A&M University Press. ISBN 978-1-58544-261-4.
