= Mujahideen =

Arabic term for people engaged in jihad ("struggle")

Mujahideen or mujahidin (Arabic: مُجَاهِدِين, romanized: mujāhidīn), is the plural form of mujahid (Arabic: مُجَاهِد, romanized: mujāhid, lit. 'strugglers or strivers, doers of jihād'), an Arabic term that broadly refers to people who engage in jihad (lit. 'struggle or striving [for justice, right conduct, Godly rule, etc.]'), interpreted in a jurisprudence of Islam as the fight on behalf of God, religion or the community (ummah).

The widespread use of the word in English began with reference to the guerrilla-type militant groups led by the Islamist Afghan fighters in the Soviet–Afghan War (see Afghan mujahideen). The term now extends to other jihadist groups in various countries.

== Early history ==
In its roots, the Arabic word mujahideen refers to any person performing jihad. In its post-classical meaning, jihad refers to an act that is spiritually comparable in reward to promoting Islam during the early 600s CE. These acts could be as simple as sharing a considerable amount of one's income with the poor.

=== Modern Western definition ===
The term continued to be used throughout India for Muslim resistance to British colonial rule. During the Indian Rebellion of 1857, these holy warriors were said to accept any deserting Indian sepoys and recruit them into their ranks. As time went by, the sect grew ever larger until it was not only conducting bandit raids but even controlling areas in Afghanistan.

The first known use of the word mujahideen to refer to insurgent Islamic extremism (what has neologically been called jihadism) was supposedly in the late 19th century, in 1887, by Thomas Patrick Hughes (1838–1911).

In Central Asia from 1916 to the 1930s, Islamic guerrillas were opponents of Tsarism and Bolshevism and were referred to by the Soviets as basmachi ('bandits'). These groups called themselves mojahed, describing themselves as standing for Islam. Other proto-mujahideen include Usman dan Fodio, Jahangir Khoja, and Muhammad Ahmed Al Mahdi.

== Cold War era ==
The name was most closely associated with the mujahideen in Afghanistan, a coalition of guerrilla groups in Afghanistan that opposed the invading Soviet forces and eventually toppled the Afghan communist government during the Afghan War (1978–92). Rival factions thereafter fell out among themselves, precipitating the rise of the Taliban and the opposing Northern Alliance.

=== Afghanistan ===
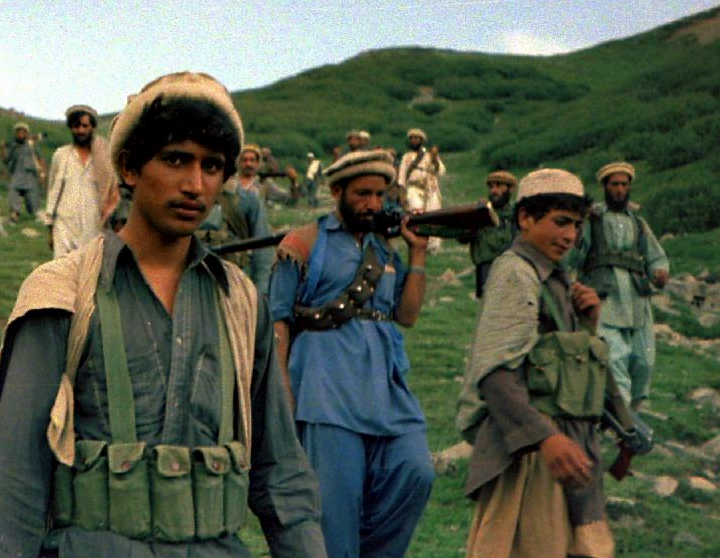
Afghan mujahideen fighters passing around the Durand Line border in 1985

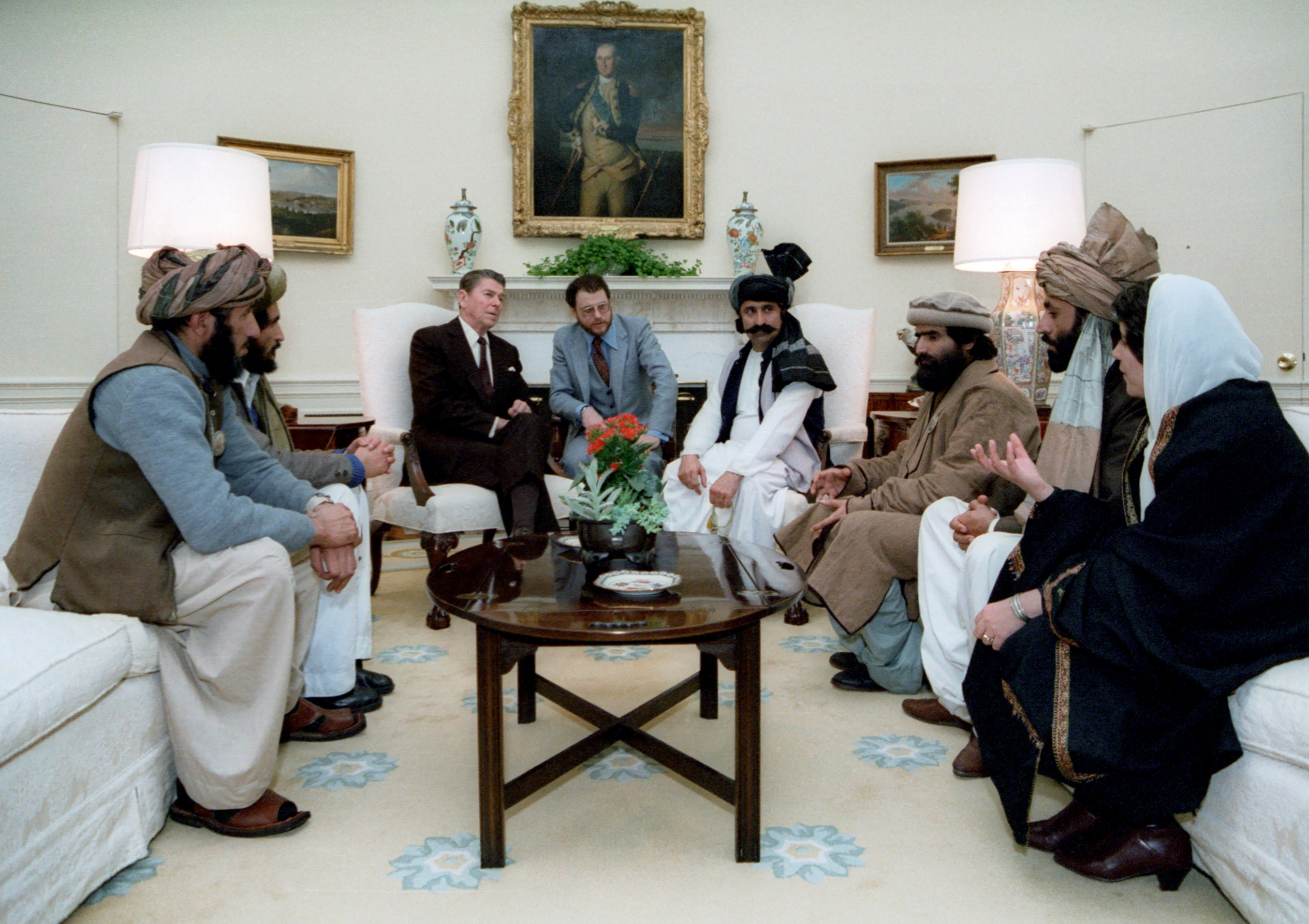
U.S. President Reagan meeting with Afghan mujahideen at the White House in 1983

Arguably the best-known mujahideen outside the Islamic world are the various, loosely aligned Afghan opposition groups who initially rebelled against the government of the pro-Soviet Democratic Republic of Afghanistan (DRA) during the late 1970s. At the DRA's request, the Soviet Union brought forces into the country to aid the government in 1979. The mujahideen fought against Soviet and DRA troops during the Soviet–Afghan War (1979–1989). Afghanistan's resistance movement originated in chaos and, at first, regional warlords waged virtually all of its fighting locally. As warfare became more sophisticated, outside support and regional coordination grew. The basic units of mujahideen organization and action continued to reflect the highly decentralized nature of Afghan society and strong loci of competing mujahideen and Pashtun tribal groups, particularly in isolated areas among the mountains. Eventually, the seven main mujahideen parties allied as the political bloc called Islamic Unity of Afghanistan Mujahideen. The parties were not under a single command and had ideological differences.

Many Muslims from other countries assisted the various mujahideen groups in Afghanistan. Some groups of these veterans became significant players in later conflicts in and around the Muslim world. Osama bin Laden, originally from a wealthy family in Saudi Arabia, was a prominent organizer and financier of an all-Arab Islamist group of foreign volunteers; his Maktab al-Khadamat funnelled money, arms, and Muslim fighters from around the Muslim world into Afghanistan, with the assistance and support of the Saudi and Pakistani governments. These foreign fighters became known as "Afghan Arabs" and their efforts were coordinated by Abdullah Yusuf Azzam.

Although the mujahideen were aided by the Pakistani, American, British, Chinese and Saudi governments, the mujahideen's primary source of funding was private donors and religious charities throughout the Muslim world—particularly in the Persian Gulf. Jason Burke recounts that "as little as 25% of the money for the Afghan jihad was actually supplied directly by states."

Mujahideen forces caused serious casualties to the Soviet forces, and made the war very costly for the Soviet Union. In 1989 the Soviet Union withdrew its forces from Afghanistan. In February 1989 the seven Sunni mujahideen factions formed an Afghan Interim Government (AIG) in Peshawar, The Interim Government had been in exile in Pakistan since 1988, led by Sibghatullah Mojaddedi, as an attempt for a united front against the DRA. The AIG became a failure, partly because it could not solve the differences between the factions; partly because of limited public support as it excluded the Iran-backed Shia mujahideen factions, and the exclusion of supporters of ex-King Mohammed Zahir Shah; and the mujahideen's failure in the Battle of Jalalabad in March 1989.

In 1992 the DRA's last president, Mohammad Najibullah, was overthrown and most mujahideen factions signed the Peshawar Accords. The mujahideen could not establish a functional united government, and many of the larger mujahideen groups began to fight each other over power in Kabul.

After several years of devastating fighting, in a small Pashtun village, a mullah named Mohammed Omar organized a new armed movement with the backing of Pakistan. This movement became known as the Taliban ("students" in Pashto), referring to how most Taliban had grown up in refugee camps in Pakistan during the 1980s and were taught in the Saudi-backed Wahhabi madrassas, religious schools known for teaching a fundamentalist interpretation of Islam.

=== Iran and Iraq ===
While more than one group in Iran has called itself mujahideen, the most famous is the People's Mujahedin of Iran (PMOI; Persian: Mojāhedin-e Khalq), an Iranian organization that advocates for the overthrow of the Islamic Republic of Iran. The group has taken part in multiple well-known conflicts in the region, and has been at odds with the conservative government of Iran since the 1979 Iranian Revolution.

Another mujahideen was the Mujahedin-e Islam, an Islamic party led by Ayatollah Abol-Ghasem Kashani. It formed part of the Iranian National Front during the time of Mohammed Mosaddeq's oil nationalization, but broke away from Mosaddeq over his allegedly un-Islamic policies.

=== Myanmar (Burma) ===
From 1947 to 1961, local mujahideen (Furikka) fought against Burmese government soldiers in an attempt to have the Mayu peninsula in northern Arakan, Burma (present-day Rakhine State, Myanmar) secede from the country, so it could be annexed by East Pakistan (present-day Bangladesh). During the late 1950s and early 1960s, the mujahideen lost most of their momentum and support, resulting in most of them surrendering to government forces.

In the 1990s, the well-armed Rohingya Solidarity Organisation was the main perpetrator of attacks on Burmese authorities positioned on the Bangladesh–Myanmar border.

=== Philippines ===
In 1969, political tensions and open hostilities developed between the Government of the Philippines and jihadist rebel groups. The Moro National Liberation Front (MNLF) was established by University of the Philippines professor Nur Misuari to condemn the killings of more than 60 Filipino Muslims and later became an aggressor against the government while the Moro Islamic Liberation Front (MILF), a splinter group from the MNLF, was established to seek an Islamic state within the Philippines and is more radical and more aggressive. The conflict is ongoing; casualty statistics vary for the conflict, with conservative estimates of the Uppsala Conflict Data Program indicating at least 6,015 people were killed in armed conflict between the Government of Philippines and ASG, BIFM, MILF, and MNLF factions between 1989 and 2012. Abu Sayyaf is an Islamic separatist group in the southern Philippines, formed in 1991. The group is known for its kidnappings of Western nationals and Filipinos, for which it has received several large ransom-payments. Some Abu Sayyaf members have studied or worked in Saudi Arabia and developed relations with the mujahideen members while fighting and training in the war against the Soviet invasion of Afghanistan.

== 1990s ==
The 1990s are a transitional period between the Mujahideen outfits forming part of the proxy wars between the Cold War superpowers and the emergence of contemporary jihadism in the wake of the US "war on terror" and the "Arab Spring".

Al-Qaeda saw its formative period during this time, and jihadism formed part of the picture in regional conflicts of the 1990s, including the Yugoslav Wars, the Algerian Civil War, the Somali Civil War, the First Nagorno-Karabakh War, the First Chechen War, etc.

=== Yugoslav Wars ===
During the Bosnian war 1992–1995, many foreign Muslims came to Bosnia as mujahideen. Muslims around the world who shared mujahideen beliefs and respected the author of Islamic Declaration come to the aid of fellow Muslims. Alija Izetbegovic, author of Islamic Declaration and in his younger days author of poem "To the Jihad" was particularly happy about the presence of Mujahedeens in Bosnia and gave them full support. El Mujahid members claimed that in Bosnia they only have respect for Alija Izetbegovic and the head of the Bosnian Army Third Corps, Sakib Mahmuljin. The number of foreign Muslim volunteers in Bosnia was estimated at 4,000 in contemporary newspaper reports. Later research estimated the number to be about 400. They came from various places such as Saudi Arabia, Pakistan, Afghanistan, Jordan, Egypt, Iraq and the Palestinian Territories; to quote the summary of the International Criminal Tribunal for the former Yugoslavia judgment:

The evidence shows that foreign volunteers arrived in central Bosnia in the second half of 1992 with the aim of helping Muslims. Mostly they came from North Africa, the Near East and the Middle East. The foreign volunteers differed considerably from the local population, not only because of their physical appearance and the language they spoke, but also because of their fighting methods. The various foreign, Muslim volunteers were primarily organized into an umbrella detachment of the 7th Muslim Brigade, which was a brigade of the Army of the Republic of Bosnia and Herzegovina, based in Zenica. This independent subdivision colloquially known as El-Mudžahid, was composed exclusively of foreign nationals and not Bosnians (whereas the 7th Muslim Brigade was entirely made up of native Bosnians) and consisted of somewhere between 300 and 1,500 volunteers. Enver Hadžihasanović, Lieutenant Colonel of the Bosnian Army's 3rd Corps, appointed Mahmut Karalić (Commandant), Asim Koričić (Chief of Staff) and Amir Kubura (Assistant Chief for Operational and Curricula) to lead the group.

Some of the mujahideen funnelled arms and money into the country which Bosnia direly needed due to a United Nations-sanctioned arms embargo restricting the import of weapons into all of the republics of the Socialist Federal Republic of Yugoslavia. Many of the mujahideen were extremely devout Muslims of the strict Salafi sect, which contrasted sharply with the relatively secular society of Bosnian Muslims. This led to friction between the mujahideen and the Bosnians.

Foreign volunteers in Bosnia have been accused of committing war crimes during the conflict. The ICTY has never issued indictments against mujahideen fighters. Instead, the ICTY indicted some Bosnian Army commanders on the basis of superior criminal responsibility. The ICTY acquitted Amir Kubura and Enver Hadžihasanović of the Bosnian 3rd Corps of all charges related to the incidents involving mujahideen. Furthermore, the Appeals Chamber noted that the relationship between the 3rd Corps and the El Mujahedin detachment was not one of subordination but was instead close to overt hostility since the only way to control the detachment was to attack them as if they were a distinct enemy force.

The ICTY Trial Chamber convicted Rasim Delić, the former chief of the Bosnian Army General Staff. The ICTY found that Delic had effective control over the El Mujahid Detachment. He was sentenced to three years of imprisonment for his failure to prevent or punish the cruel treatment of twelve captured Serb soldiers by the Mujahideen. Delic remained in the Detention Unit while appellate proceedings continued.

Some individuals of the Bosnian Mujahideen, such as Abdelkader Mokhtari, Fateh Kamel, and Karim Said Atmani, gained particular prominence within Bosnia as well as international attention from various foreign governments. They were all North African volunteers with well established links to Islamic Fundamentalist groups before and after the Bosnian War.

In 2015, former Human Rights Minister and Federation BiH Vice President Mirsad Kebo talked about numerous war crimes committed against Serbs by mujahideen in Bosnia and their links with current and past Muslim officials including former and current presidents of federation and presidents of parliament based on war diaries and other documented evidence. He gave evidence to the BiH federal prosecutor.

== Contemporary Jihadism ==
The neologism jihadists may correspond to the original Arabic mujahedeen.

=== South Asia ===
In India, an outfit calling itself the Indian Mujahideen came to light in 2008 with multiple large scale terror attacks. On 26 November 2008, a group calling itself the Deccan Mujahideen claimed responsibility for a string of attacks across Mumbai. The Weekly Standard claimed, "Indian intelligence believes the Indian Mujahideen is a front group created by Lashkar-e-Taiba and the Harkat-ul-Jihad-al-Islami to confuse investigators and cover the tracks of the Students Islamic Movement of India, or SIMI, a radical Islamist movement with aim to establish Islamic rule over India. In the Indian state of Jammu and Kashmir, Kashmiri Muslim separatists opposing Indian rule are often known as mujahideen. The members of the Salafi movement (within Sunni Islam) in the south Indian state of Kerala is known as "Mujahids".

Many militant groups have been involved in the war in North West Pakistan, most notably the Tehrik-i-Taliban Pakistan, Al Qaeda, and ISIS Khorasan Province. These groups refer to themselves as the mujahideen in their war against the Pakistani military and the west. Several different militant groups have also taken root in Pakistan-controlled Kashmir. Most noticeable of these groups are Lashkar-e-Taiba (LeT), Jaish-e-Mohammed (JeM), Jammu and Kashmir Liberation Front (JKLF), Hizbul Mujahideen and Harkat-ul-Mujahideen (HuM). A 1996 report by Human Rights Watch estimated the number of active mujahideen at 3,200.

Lashkar-e-Taiba became associated with attacks outside Kashmir, including mass-casualty operations in India. Scholars describe the group's adoption of fedayeen or suicide attacks and identified the 2001 attack on Indian Parliament and 2008 Mumbai attacks as examples of such.

In Bangladesh, the Jamaat-ul-Mujahideen was an Islamist organisation that was officially banned by the government of Bangladesh in February 2005 after attacks on NGOs. It struck back in mid-August when it detonated 500 bombs at 300 locations throughout Bangladesh.

=== Iraq and Syria ===
==== Iraqi insurgency ====
The term mujahideen is sometimes applied to fighters who joined the insurgency after the 2003 invasion of Iraq. Some groups also use the word mujahideen in their names, like Mujahideen Shura Council and Mujahideen Army.

Following the U.S. invasion of Iraq as part of the George W. Bush administration's post 9/11 foreign policy, many foreign Mujahideen joined several Sunni militant groups resisting the U.S. occupation of Iraq. A considerable part of the insurgents did not come from Iraq but instead from many other Arab countries, notably Jordan and Saudi Arabia. Among these recruits was Abu Musab al-Zarqawi, a Jordanian national who would go on to assume the leadership of Al-Qaeda in Iraq (AQI).

==== Syrian civil war ====
Various Islamic groups, often referred to as mujahideen and jihadists, have participated in the Syrian civil war. Alawites, the sect to which Syrian President Bashar al-Assad belongs, are considered to be heretics in Sunni Muslim circles. In this sense, radical Sunni jihadist organizations and their affiliates have been anti-Assad. Jihadist leaders and intelligence sources said foreign fighters had begun to enter Syria only in February 2012. In May 2012, Syria's U.N. envoy Bashar Ja'afari declared that dozens of foreign fighters from Libya, Tunisia, Egypt, Britain, France elsewhere had been captured or killed, and urged Saudi Arabia, Qatar and Turkey to stop "their sponsorship of the armed rebellion". Jihadist leaders and intelligence sources said foreign fighters had begun to enter Syria only in February 2012. In June, it was reported that hundreds of foreign fighters, many linked to al-Qaeda, had gone to Syria to fight against Assad. When asked if the United States would arm the opposition, Hillary Clinton expressed doubts that such weapons would be effective in the toppling of the Syrian government and may even fall into the hands of al-Qaeda or Hamas.

American officials assumed already in 2012 that Qaidat al-Jihad (a.k.a. Al-Qaeda in Iraq) has conducted bomb attacks against Syrian government forces, Iraqi Foreign Minister Hoshyar Zebari said that al-Qaeda in Iraq members have gone to Syria, where the militants previously received support and weapons from the Syrian government in order to destabilize the US occupation of Iraq. On 23 April, one of the leaders of Fatah al-Islam, Abdel Ghani Jawhar, was killed during the Battle of Al-Qusayr, after he unintentionally blew himself up while making a bomb. In July 2012, Iraq's foreign minister again warned that members of al-Qaeda in Iraq were seeking refuge in Syria and moving there to fight.

It is believed that al-Qaeda leader Ayman al-Zawahiri condemned Assad.

A member of the Abdullah Azzam Brigades in Lebanon admitted that his group had sent fighters to Syria. On 12 November 2018, the United States closed its financial system to an Iraqi named, Shibl Muhsin 'Ubayd Al-Zaydi and others over concerns that they were sending Iraqi fighters to Syria and financial support to other Hezbollah activities in the region.

=== Israel ===
The Mujahideen Shura Council in the Environs of Jerusalem (MSC) was designated as a Foreign Terrorist Organization (FTO) by the U.S. Department of State.

On 12 November 2018, the Department of State blacklisted the Al-Mujahidin Brigades (AMB) over its alleged Hezbollah associations, as well as Jawad Nasrallah, son of Lebanon's Iran-backed Hezbollah leader Sayyed Hassan Nasrallah, from using the United States financial system and further naming him a terrorist associated with evidence of his involvement in attacks against Israel in the West Bank. It had been reported in Israel that the AMB was formerly linked to the Fatah rather than the Hamas organization.

=== Africa ===
==== Nigeria ====
Boko Haram has been active in Nigeria since it was founded in 2001. It existed in other forms before 2001. Although it initially limited its operations to northeast Nigeria, it has since expanded to other parts of Nigeria, and to Cameroon, Niger and Chad. Boko Haram seeks to implement sharia law across Nigeria.

==== Somalia ====
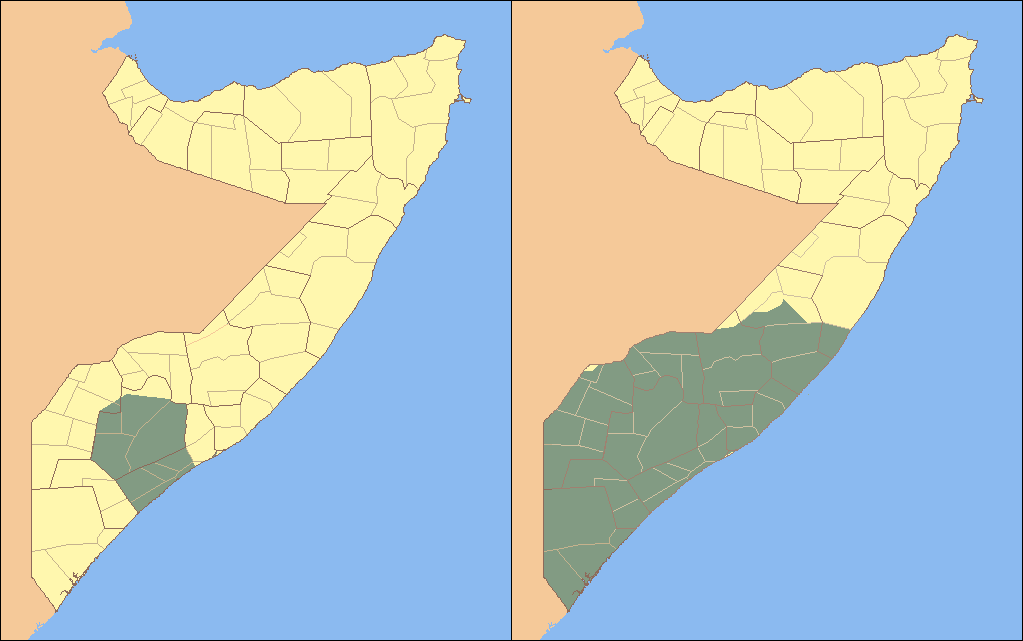
Al-Shabaab militants made gains (2009–10) in guerrilla-style attacks.

The currently active jihadist groups in Somalia derive from the Al-Itihaad al-Islamiya group active during the 1990s.

In July 2006, a Web-posted message purportedly written by Osama bin Laden urged Somalis to build an Islamic state in the country and warned western states that his al-Qaeda network would fight against them if they intervened there. Foreign fighters began to arrive, though there were official denials of the presence of mujahideen in the country. Even so, the threat of jihad was made openly and repeatedly in the months preceding the Battle of Baidoa. On 23 December 2006, Islamists, for the first time, called upon international fighters to join their cause. The term mujahideen is now openly used by the post-ICU resistance against the Ethiopians and the TFG.

Harakat al-Shabaab Mujahideen is said to have non-Somali foreigners in its ranks, particularly among its leadership. Fighters from the Persian Gulf and international jihadists were called to join the holy war against the Somali government and its Ethiopian allies. Though Somali Islamists did not use suicide bombing tactics before, the foreign elements of al-Shabaab are blamed for several suicide bombings. Egypt has a longstanding policy of securing the Nile River flow by destabilizing Ethiopia. Similarly, recent media reports said that Egyptian and Arab jihadists were the core members of Al-Shabaab, and were training Somalis in sophisticated weaponry and suicide bombing techniques.

== Chinese ban ==
In April 2017, the government of China prohibited parents from choosing the name Mujahid as the given name for a child. The list included more than two dozen names (including Muhammad) and was targeted at the 10 million Uyghurs in the western region of Xinjiang as part of the persecution of Uyghurs in China.

== See also ==
- Islamism
- Jihad-(ism)
- List of battles of Muhammad
- Pan-Islamism
- Volunteers of the Faith
- Terrorism
