= Foreign fighter =

A foreign fighter is someone who travels abroad to participate in an armed conflict, or fights for a country of which he or she is not a national. However, different definitions have been used by different journalists, policymakers, and researchers, depending on what distinctions they've wished to make.

== See also ==
- French Foreign Legion
- Spanish Foreign Legion
- Portuguese Foreign Legion
- International response to the Spanish Civil War
  - International Brigades
- Foreign support of Finland in the Winter War
- Mahal (Israel)
- Waffen-SS foreign volunteers and conscripts
- Foreign volunteers in the Rhodesian Security Forces
- Foreign fighters in the Croatian War of Independence
- Foreign fighters in the Bosnian War
- Foreign fighters in the Syrian Civil War and War in Iraq
- Foreign fighters in the Russo-Ukrainian War
  - Ukrainian volunteer battalions
- Controversy surrounding Swedish jihadist foreign fighters
- Final Report of the Task Force on Combating Terrorist and Foreign Fighter Travel
- List of foreign volunteers
