= Croatia–Ireland relations =

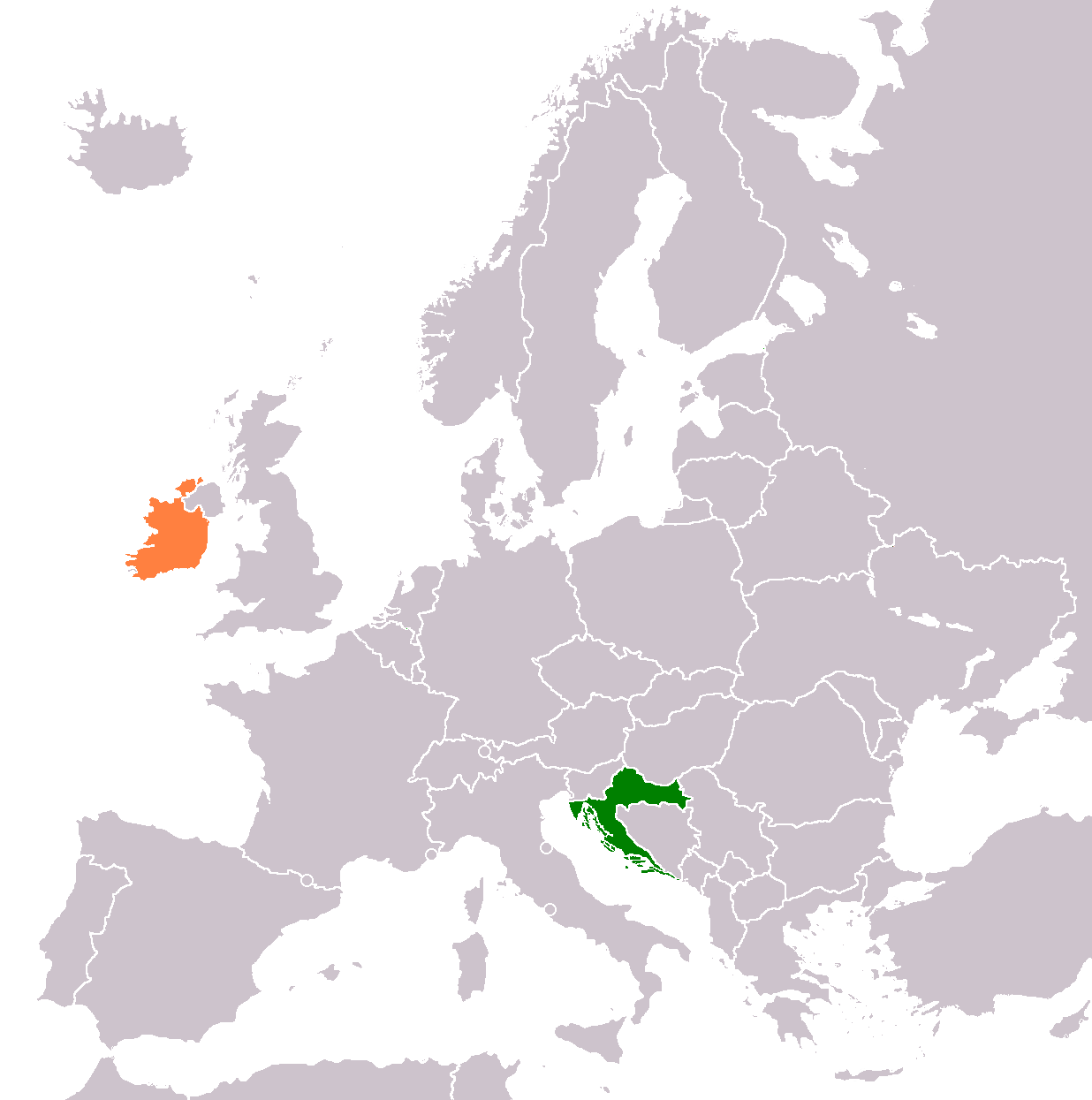

- Croatia: Ireland

Diplomatic mission
- Croatian embassy in Dublin: Irish embassy in Zagreb

Diplomatic relations between the republics of Croatia and Ireland were established on 27 January 1995 following Croatia's independence from SFR Yugoslavia. Ireland recognised Croatia as an independent state on 15 January 1992. Croatia is represented in Ireland through consulate and embassy in Dublin, while Ireland is represented in Croatia through its embassy and consulate in Zagreb. Both countries are full members of Council of Europe and of the European Union. In 2019, Croatian community in Ireland was around 20,000 people.

== Relations ==
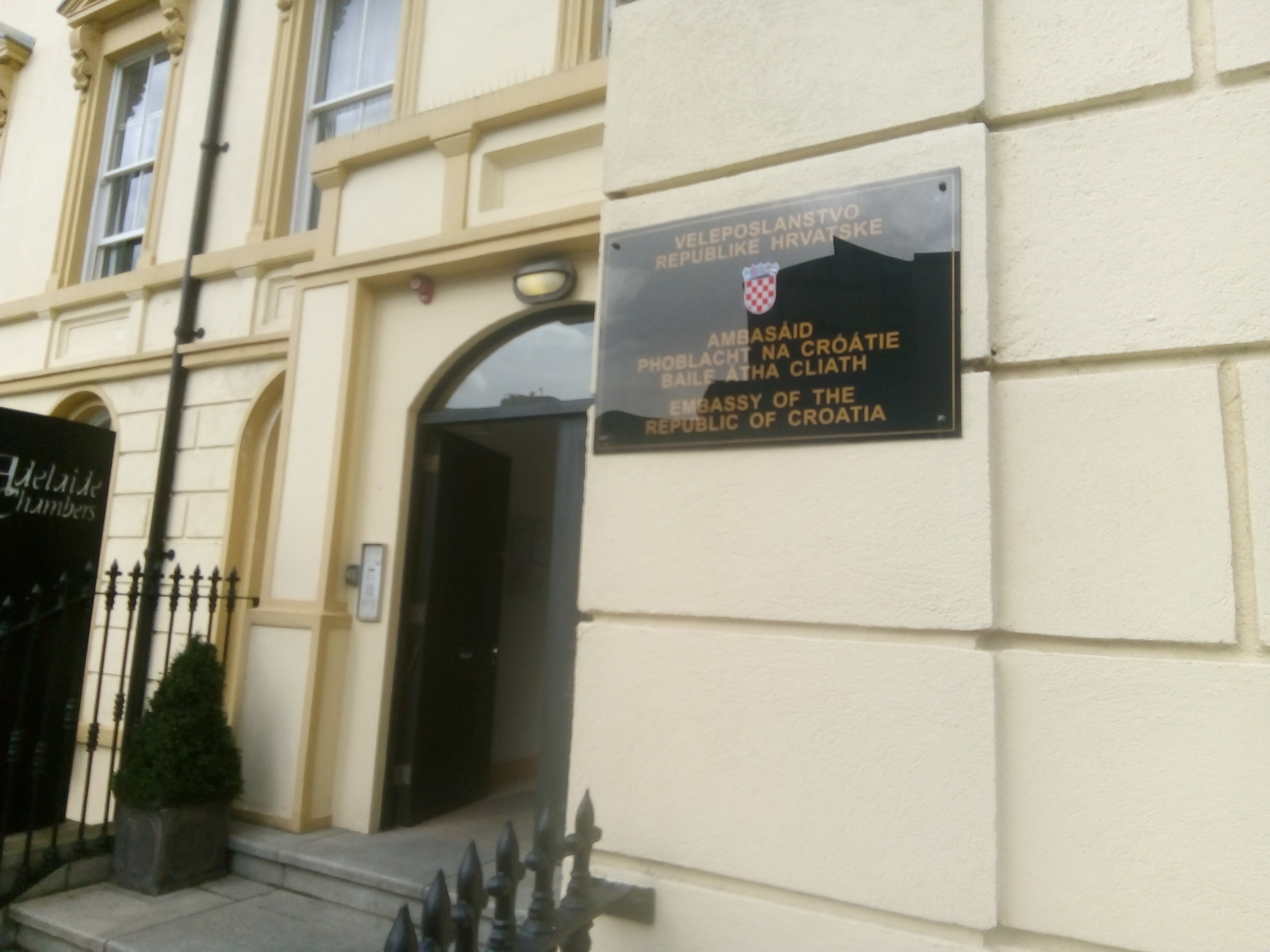
Croatian embassy on Peter Street, Dublin

Relations between Croatia and Ireland are very good. The two countries are friendly and have no open political issues. Ireland provided strong support for the Croatian accession to the EU. During the Irish presidency of the EU Council in the first half of 2004, Croatia received a positive avis and in June of the same year the EU candidate status.

In June 2003, Croatian Prime Minister Ivica Račan visited Ireland during which he met with the Taoiseach Bertie Ahern, Speaker of the Dail Rory O'Hanlon and Speaker of the Seanad Rory Kiely.

In November 2005, Taoiseach Bertie Ahern visited Croatia during which he met with Croatian President Stjepan Mesić, Prime Minister Ivo Sanader, Parliament Speaker Vladimir Šeks and many other officials. Taoiseach Ahern expressed his support for the Croatian accession to the EU, and described relations between Croatia and Ireland as "very cordial and friendly". Both Prime Ministers emphasized the importance of deeper economic, cultural and scientific cooperation between Croatia and Ireland. Prime Minister Sanader stressed that Croatia took the Irish experience in facilitating the process for the incorporation of companies and the opening of trade businesses.

In June 2013, Irish president Michael D. Higgins visited Croatia in an official state visit thus becoming the first Irish president in history to do so. During his visit, president Higgins met with Croatian president Ivo Josipović and many other state officials, and gave a lecture at the University of Zagreb on the experience of Irish membership in the European Union and the future of the EU.

On 1 September 2016 Roman Catholic Archdiocese of Đakovo-Osijek opened Croatian Catholic Mission in Dublin whose goal is to fulfil religious and spiritual needs of the Croatian Catholics in Ireland.

On 5 April 2017, Croatian President Kolinda Grabar-Kitarović visited Ireland. During her three-day state visit, she visited Dublin and Galway, which has been selected European Capital of Culture for 2020 together with Croatian town of Rijeka, and met with representatives of the Croatian community in Ireland, Irish president Michael D. Higgins, Prime Minister Enda Kenny, leaders of the Irish Parliament, Lord Mayor of Dublin Brendan Carr and Mayor of Galway Noel Larkin. Presidents Grabar-Kitarović and Higgins discussed several important aspects of Croatian-Irish relations and joint work within the European Union, specifically the European project, European values and their countries' attitudes. Grabar-Kitarović stated that she looked at Ireland as an "example of a state that has grown from a closed agrarian society into a modern society", that "Croatia wants to copy the Irish model of investment in education and IT sector, with the implementation of tax reform in order to attract multinational companies", and has praised Irish policies by which it significantly stopped emigration and attracted many Irish to return from abroad. Prime Minister Kenny stressed that Croatia had made a big step forward in a very short time period, that he was very well aware of Irish responsibilities in Southeast Europe, and that Ireland would cooperate with Croatia in the priorities it has set. He also emphasised the importance of strengthening trade relations between Croatia and Ireland. President Grabar-Kitarović participated at the traditional tree planting ceremony in the gardens of the Office of the President of Ireland, laid a wreath in the Garden of Remembrance, and visited EPIC The Irish Emigration Museum.

== Notable people ==
The history between Croatia and Ireland dates back to the 8th century when Croatia was first founded as a duchy. There is a long line of relations between the Croatian and Irish people as exemplified in the lives of Saint Donatus of Zadar, Laval Nugent von Westmeath, James Joyce, William Butler Yeats, and more recently Thomas Crowley.

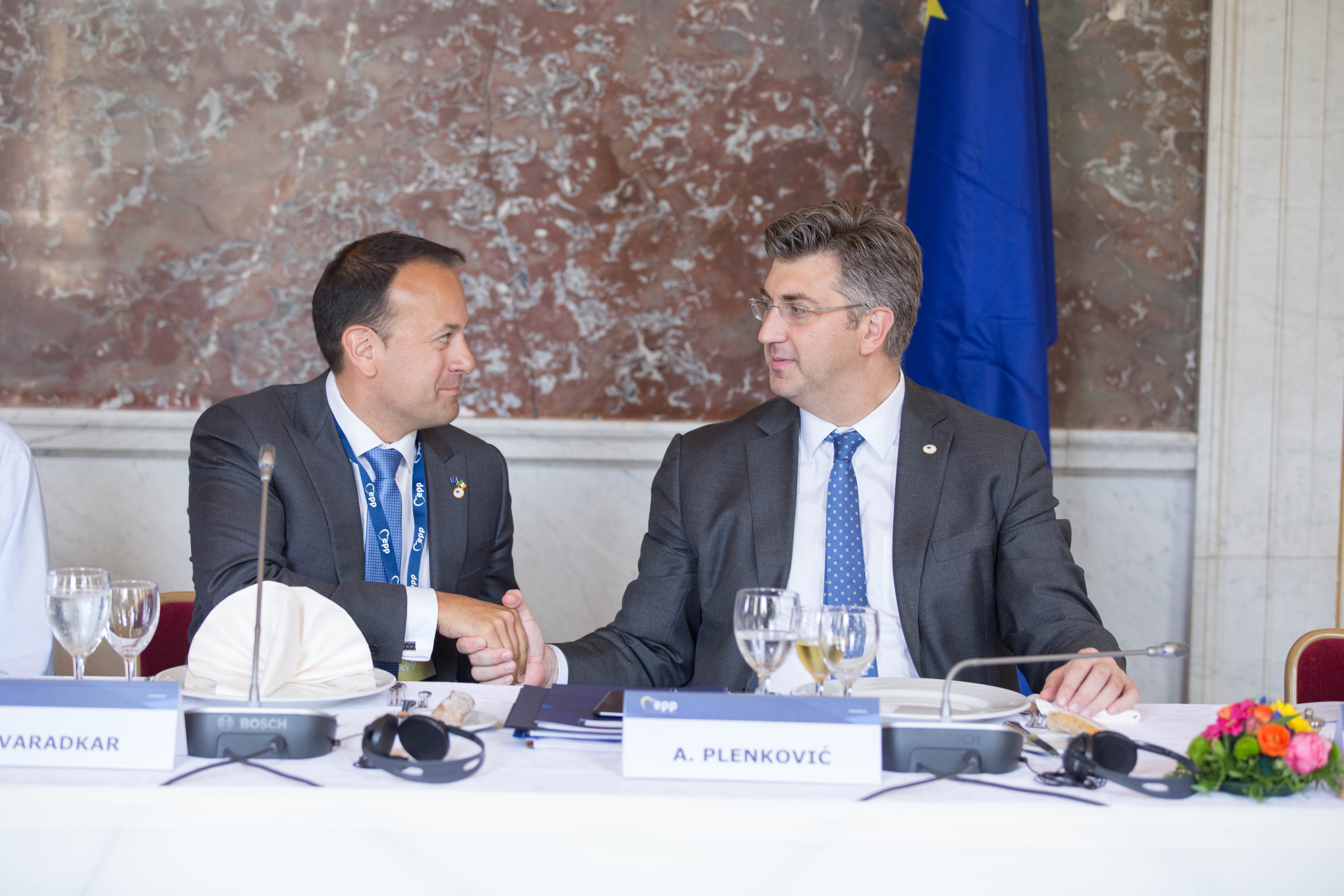
Irish PM Leo Varadkar and Croatian PM Andrej Plenković, European People's Party Summit in Brussels, June 2017.

Saint Donatus of Zadar was, according to legend, an Irishman born in County Louth who became a bishop in the 8th century and who built the church on the foundations of the ancient Roman forum in the Croatian town of Zadar that today bears his name. St. Donatus also served as an ambassador for the various cities of Dalmatia to the Charlemagne's court. In 1809, following the French occupation of Zadar, his remains were transferred to the Cathedral of St Anastasia in Zadar where he rests today. In 1813, Irishman Laval Nugent von Westmeath drove the French from Zadar. The feast day of Saint Donatus is celebrated on 25 February.

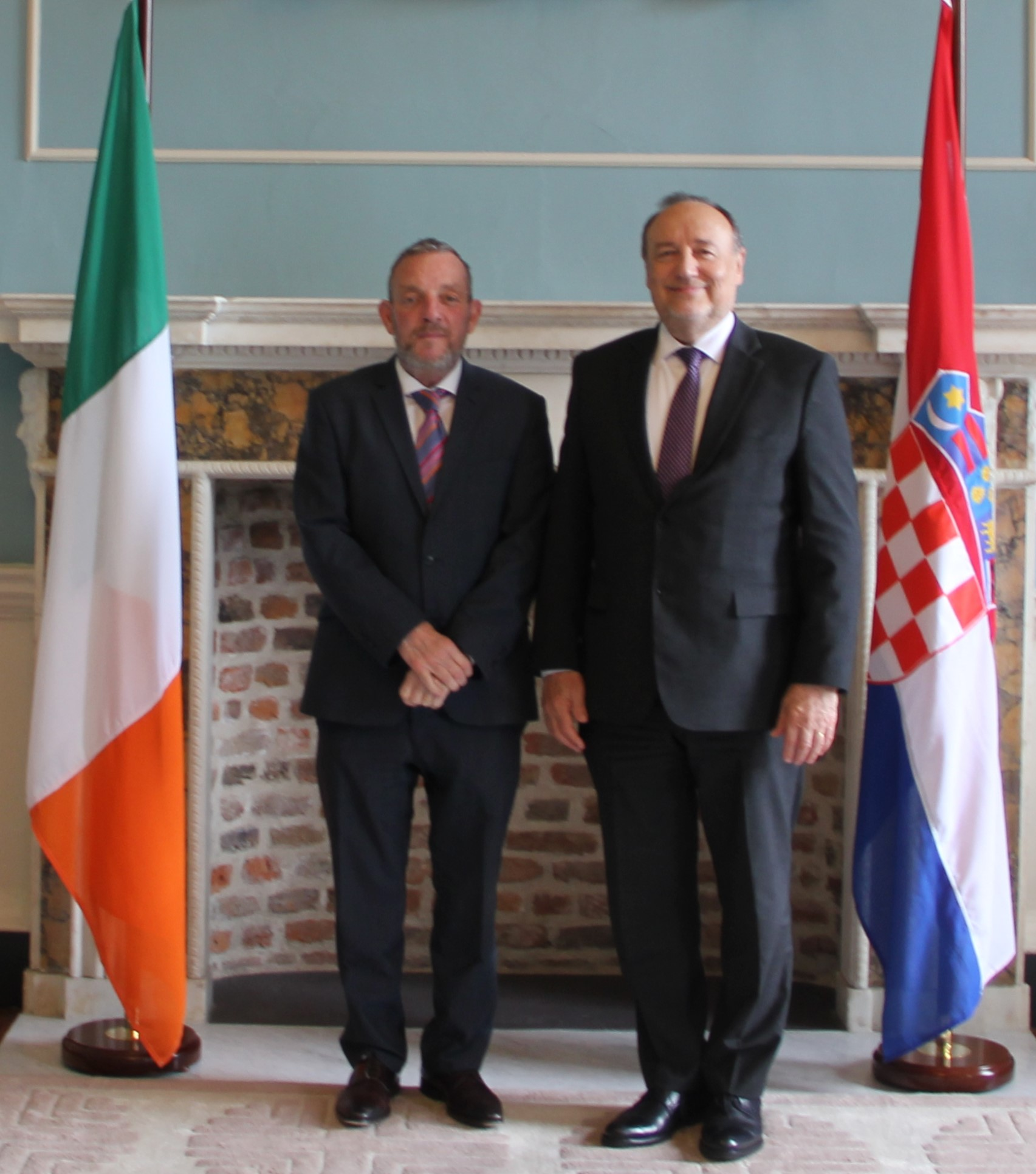
Jerry Buttimer, welcomed to Leinster House the Ambassador of Croatia to Ireland, Davor Vidiš, on National Day of Croatia, 30 May 2024

Count Laval Nugent von Westmeath was born in Ireland in 1777 and moved to the Kingdom of Croatia in 1793 after his father Ignatius Nugent was killed in the Battle of Belgrade. In 1813, von Westmeath became Chief of Staff for the Imperial Army and led the campaign that liberated Croatia, Istria and the Po Valley from the French viceroy Eugène de Beauharnais. He went on to become a member of the Croatian Parliament and the first person to open a museum in Croatia. Also, von Westmeath recommended that Josip Jelačić should be given the title of Ban in 1848. Afterwards, Jelačić indeed became a Ban, and quickly set about disputing any claims Austria had on the Croatian territories. Von Westmeath was fully supportive of this move and enthusiastically declared himself a ‘Croat’. He died on 22 August 1862 in the Bosiljevo Castle near Karlovac. He left all of his possessions, including two fully restored castles and expensive artwork, to Croatia.

On the recommendation of the famous Irish poet William Butler Yeats, Croatian sculptor and architect Ivan Meštrović was asked in 1927 to submit a design of the first Irish coins. Unfortunately, Mestrović was, by someone else's fault, late in submitting his design to the tender. "Having discovered that the deadline had passed, Meštrović had made magnificent design and generously donated it to the Irish Free State", wrote Yeats. Meštrović's original work is being kept in the National Museum of Ireland. Since 1965 Irish Central Bank uses this design on its official seal.

James Joyce eloped to Pula as a 22-year-old man with his girlfriend (later to be his wife), Nora Barnacle to teach English with the Berlitz Corporation. It was in Pula where Joyce first practiced those unconventional writing forms that later made him famous. There is Joyce's statue at the Caffe Uliks in Pula where he used to frequent.

Irishman Thomas Crowley is considered to be a hero in Croatia because of his active role in the Croatian War of Independence. He joined as a volunteer with the Croatian Defence Forces in 1991 and was assigned to the Ante Paradžik First Battalion. He participated as a commando in battles at Dubrovnik, Livno, Mostar, Popovo Polje, Operation Maslenica, the liberation of Škabrnja and Zemunik, where he was wounded. In 1994 he led a training camp for the 114th brigade. He was killed in action near Dubrovnik in 1995 and is buried near Split. He died as a Major in the Croatian Armed Forces and was posthumously awarded the Croatian Medal of Honour in 2012.

== Economic relations ==
From 1993 to 2011, Irish businessmen invested 139.3 million euros into Croatian economy and thus took 18th place among top investors in Croatia. In 2019, Croatia was visited by 85,566 Irish tourists who made 395,579 overnight stays, placing Ireland in top 30 visitors to Croatia in 2019.

In 2010, Irish investments in Croatia amounted 70.4 million euros. Croatia exported to Ireland products worth 14.4 million euros (mainly medical and pharmaceutical products nd fertilizers), and imported from it products worth 73.1 million euros (mostly essential oils and perfumes, medicines, machinery and various chemicals). In 2012, Croatia exported to Ireland goods worth $13.3 million and imported from it goods worth $94.5 million.

== Croats in Ireland ==
Since the Croatian accession to the EU in 2013 Ireland has become one of the most popular destinations for the Croatian migrant workers. Facebook group in which members advise each other about living in Ireland-"Let's go to Ireland" (Idemo u Irsku), had more than 40,000 members in 2017. On 16 June 2015 Croatian Radiotelevision aired its documentary about Croatian emigrants in Ireland titled "Our Beautiful Ireland - Promised Land for the Croatian People" (Lijepa naša Irska - obećana za hrvatske građane)". In 2015 and January 2016, 5,500 Croats moved to Ireland, mostly to Dublin, Cork, Limerick and Galway. Between Croatia's accessions to the European Union in 2013 and 2017, 14,552 Croatian migrant workers moved to Ireland.

On the night of March 30, 2024, two Croatian citizens named Josip Strok (31) and David Družinec were attacked on their way home by a group of men in Clondalkin, west Dublin according to the Foreign Ministry of Ireland. After several days of fighting for his life due to a severe head injury, Josip Strok died in Tallaght Hospital in Dublin. According to the testimony of the David Družinec, Croatian media reported that the violent attack on two Croatian young men was racially motivated. Dublin Communities Against Racism (DCAR) condemned the assault and said Josip died as a result of a “racist attack”.

== See also ==
- Foreign relations of Croatia
- Foreign relations of Ireland
- Ireland–Yugoslavia relations
