= Ireland–Yugoslavia relations =

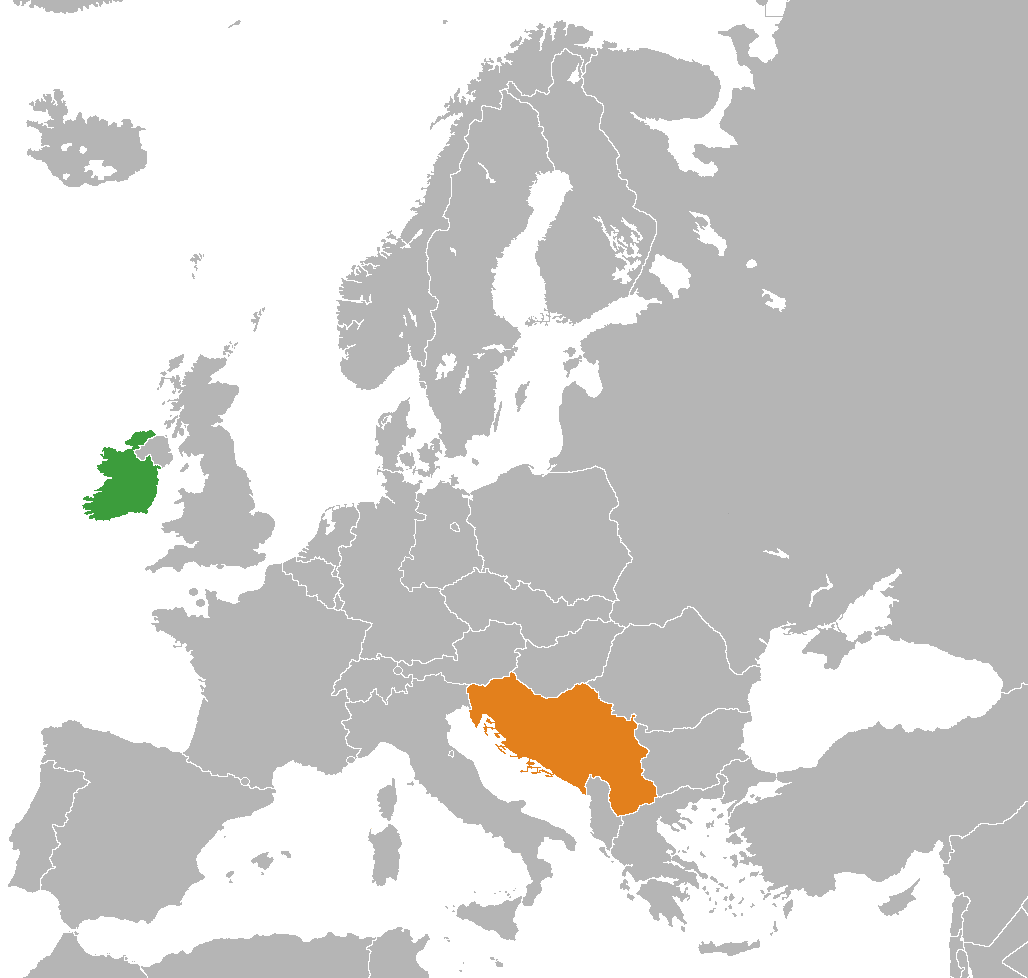

- Ireland: Yugoslavia

Ireland–Yugoslavia relations (Serbo-Croatian: Odnosi Irska i Jugoslavije, Односи Ирска и Југославије; Slovene: Odnosi med Irska in Jugoslavijo; Macedonian: Односите Ирска-Југославија) were historical foreign relations between Ireland and now defunct Socialist Federal Republic of Yugoslavia. During the Cold War both Ireland and Yugoslavia refused to formally join either the NATO or Warsaw Pact military alliances with Ireland's claim of military neutrality and post-1948 Tito-Stalin split Yugoslavia focusing on diplomatic relations within the Non-Aligned Movement. During the Informbiro period Yugoslavia indirectly associated itself with NATO via the Balkan Pact (1953).

== Country comparison ==
Common name	Ireland	Yugoslavia
Official name	Republic of Ireland	Socialist Federal Republic of Yugoslavia
Coat of arms		
Flag		
Capital	Dublin	Belgrade
Largest city	Dublin	Belgrade
Population	3,970,155	23,229,846
Government	Unitary Parliamentary republic	Socialist republic
Official languages	English, Irish	No official language Serbo-Croatian (de facto state-wide) Slovene (in Slovenia) and Macedonian (in Macedonia)
First leader	Douglas Hyde	Joseph Broz Tito
Current/last leader	Michael D. Higgins	Milan Pančevski
Religion	Catholic church (de facto), Secular state (de jure)	Secular state (de jure), state atheism (de facto)
Alliances	EEC	Non-Aligned Movement

== History ==
=== 1920s to 1950 ===
The Irish revolutionary period attracted significant media attention in the Kingdom of Yugoslavia, particularly in Belgrade and Zagreb. It influenced parliamentary debates and the Croat autonomists movement which led to the creation of the Banovina Croatia. During the interwar period Hubert Butler spent three years in Yugoslavia.

In 1946, the Parliament of Ireland discussed the case of Alojzije Stepinac on two occasions, and adopted a Resolution on Religious Freedom which called on the Minister of Foreign Affairs to share information on the Stepinac case. Hubert Butler visited Yugoslavia again after the war where he tried to investigate Ustashe genocide against Serbs of Croatia and Serbs of Bosnia and Herzegovina. He critiqued Irish public discourse on persecution of Catholicism in postwar Yugoslavia by highlighting what was in Ireland lesser known story of Catholic clergy complicity and collaboration with quisling regime. He published multiple texts on the topic including an essay titled "The Sub-Prefect Should Have Held His Tongue". During his rebuttal of Count O'Brien lecture at the Foreign Affairs Association, papal nuncio in Ireland walked out of the room leading to public scandal and what was described as Butler's internal exile.

=== 1955 friendly soccer game incident ===
In 1955, one year after Yugoslavia defeated England in Belgrade, the Football Association of Ireland organized a friendly soccer game with Yugoslavia at Dalymount Park. The Roman Catholic archbishop of Dublin John Charles McQuaid, supported by various government ministers and senior civil servants, called for the cancellation of the game quoting ″continued persecution of the Catholic Church in communist Yugoslavia″ and especially the case of Alojzije Stepinac, which had inspired earlier mass protests in Ireland. The Irish national broadcasting service Raidió Teilifís Éireann declined to cover the game after its main sports commentator Phil Greene pulled out of the broadcast. As the game went ahead and was attended by 21,400 fans it was interpreted by many as a public protest against conservatisms and excessive influence of the Catholic Church in Ireland in public life.

=== From 1960 ===
In 1967, Radio Television Belgrade recorded a documentary on daily life in Ireland which was presented to audiences in the Socialist Republic of Serbia.

The two countries cancelled their mutual visa requirements in reciprocity in 1974, and formal diplomatic relations were established in 1977. In 1980 President Patrick Hillery, Tánaiste George Colley along with Ruairí Ó Brádaigh of Sinn Féin, Andy Barr of the Communist Party of Ireland and Billy McKee of the Provisional Irish Republican Army all attended the state funeral of President Josip Broz Tito.

Following the breakup of Yugoslavia, Irish judge Maureen Harding Clark served at the International Criminal Tribunal for the former Yugoslavia.

== See also ==
- Yugoslavia–European Communities relations
- Croatia–Ireland relations
- Ireland–Kosovo relations
- ireland–Serbia relations
- Yugoslavia in the Eurovision Song Contest 1971
- Yugoslavia in the Eurovision Song Contest 1988
- Ireland in the Eurovision Song Contest 1990
