= Ireland–Serbia relations =

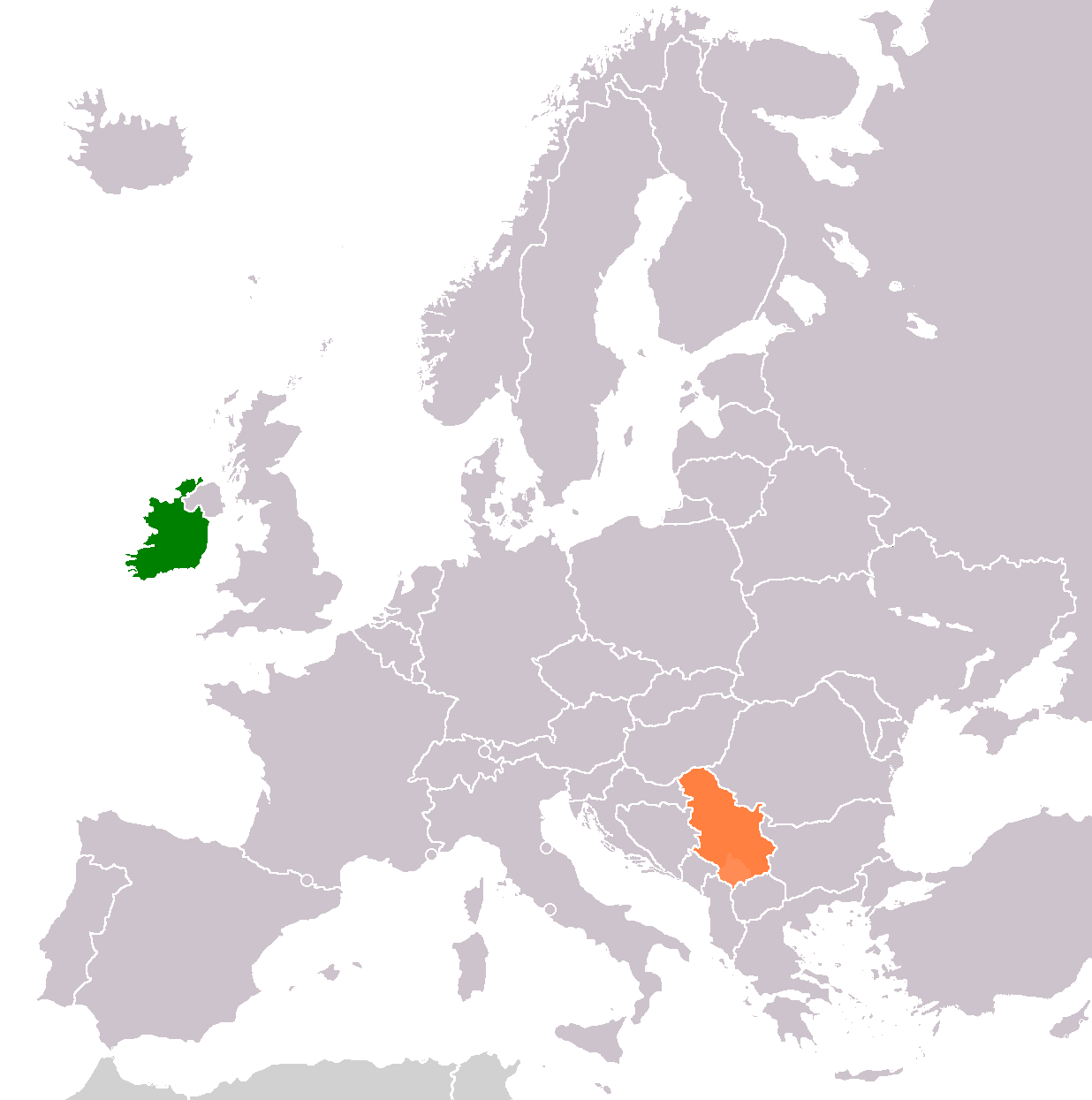

- Ireland: Serbia

Ireland and Serbia maintain diplomatic relations established between Ireland and SFR Yugoslavia in 1977. From 1977 to 2006, Ireland maintained relations with the Socialist Federal Republic of Yugoslavia (SFRY) and the Federal Republic of Yugoslavia (FRY) (later Serbia and Montenegro), of which Serbia is considered shared (SFRY) or sole (FRY) legal successor.

== History ==
In 2026, Ireland’s Minister for European Affairs and Defence Thomas Byrne called discussions on a state funeral for Ratko Mladić in Serbia, or the participation of Serbian government officials in the ceremony, "unacceptable."

== Economic relations ==
Trade between two countries amounted to nearly $227 million in 2023; Irish merchandise exports to Serbia were standing at over $197 million; Serbia's export to Ireland were about $30 million.

== Resident diplomatic missions ==
- Ireland has an embassy in Belgrade.
- Serbia is represented in Ireland through its embassy in London, United Kingdom.

== See also ==
- Foreign relations of Ireland
- Foreign relations of Serbia
- Ireland–Yugoslavia relations
