= Foreign fighters in the Croatian War of Independence =

Foreign participants in the Croatian War of Independence

The Croatian War of Independence (1991–1995) is said to have attracted "mercenaries, adventurers and idealists", most joining the Croatian side.

== Croatian side ==
Croats from Bosnia and Herzegovina, and also the diaspora, joined the Croatian side. The war attracted 'mercenaries, adventurers and idealists', most of whom joined the Croatian Defence Forces (HOS), the paramilitary wing of the Croatian Party of Rights, at the beginning of the war. An interview with mercenaries was published in The Times in November 1991. Many extreme right volunteers from Western Europe, mainly from Germany, joined the HOS. Although Russians mainly volunteered on the Serb side, the small neo-Nazi "Werewolf" unit fought on the Croat side. The Croatian Army's "First International Brigade" based outside Osijek that consisted of 100 men had about half of the ranks being foreigners from France, Canada, Switzerland, Hungary, Portugal, Britain, Australia, the United States and Spain.

Yugoslav Albanians joined the Croatian Army in the war. There is a veterans organization (Croatian: Udruga Albanaca branitelja Hrvatske u Domovinskom ratu) of these. It is estimated by that veterans organization that 10,000 ethnic Albanians fought in the Croatian Army, out of whom 87 died. The Community of Associations of Volunteers (Croatian: Zajednice udruga dragovoljaca Domovinskoga rata) registered 2,579 Albanians fighting in the Croatian Army in 1991. Albanian President Bujar Nishani gave the Albanian veterans organization an order. Among notable Kosovo Albanians that fought in the Croatian Army were Rahim Ademi (ranked brigadier-general), Agim Çeku (ranked general), and Bekim Berisha.

=== Ustaše in Australia ===
The collapse of the Socialist Republic of Yugoslavia in the early 1990s gave hope to many Croatian-Australians that a truly independent Croatian nation would be formed. It also gave the organisational ability of Ustaše ideologues in Australian society much increased impetus. Significant funding was raised by people such as Stjepan Kardum the leader of the Sydney Branch of the neo-Ustaše group called the Croatian Party of Rights (HSP). This money was funnelled into the formation of the HSP's ultra-nationalistic paramilitary units called the Croatian Defence Forces (Hrvatske obrambene snage or HOS) that fought in the Croatian War of Independence. These units operated separate from the control of the regular Armed Forces of Croatia and were involved in pillage, rape and mass killings of civilians at places like the Dretelj prison camp in southern Bosnia.

Flag of the HOS

The HSP and HOS saw themselves as a continuation of the Ustaša regime and desired the recreation of a Greater Croatia based upon the borders of the Nazi puppet-state of the NDH which included all of Bosnia to the west of the Drina River. Members of HOS openly labelled themselves as Ustaše, their black uniforms and insignia emulated the Crna Legija and their marching anthem glorified the NDH, the Poglavnik and other Ustaša leaders such as Jure Francetić and Rafael Boban. Their slogan was the Ustaša salute Za dom spremni and even their name was derived from the military units of the NDH, the Hrvatske oružane snage.

It is estimated that up to 200 Croatian-Australians fought in the HOS paramilitary units. The HOS forces in the Bosnian region were led by Croatian-Australian Blaž Kraljević who was previously a member of the HRB and other ultra-nationalist groups in Australia. Kraljević was given the rank of major general and carried out systematic ethnic cleansing operations during the war. The HOS and their goal of establishing an Ustaša state were considered dangerous to the aims and the stability of the newly created modern Croatia to the point where Kraljević was assassinated by Croatian forces in 1992 and the HOS were soon after forcibly disbanded. Croatian-Australians also fought under Željko Glasnović and compared their unit with the 369th Ustaše Division who fought alongside the Nazis in the Battle of Stalingrad.

== Yugoslav side ==
There were around 700 former JNA officers, mostly from Serbia and Montenegro, that fought on the Yugoslav side.

A small number of Russian volunteers, from Russia and other states of the former USSR, fought for the armed forces of Yugoslavia or the Republic of Serbian Krajina, as well as for Serbian paramilitary groups, such as the Serbian Volunteer Guard, led by Arkan. The majority of these Russian volunteers arrived in 1992 and 1993.

== Notable people ==
- Bekim Berisha, Kosovo Albanian, HV
- Rahim Ademi, Kosovo Albanian, HV
- Agim Çeku, Kosovo Albanian, HV
- Ridvan Qazimi, Kosovo Albanian, HV
- Thomas Crowley, Irish, HOS †
- Jean-Michel Nicolier, French, HOS †
- Eduardo Rózsa-Flores, Hungarian, HV

== See also ==
- Croatian Revolutionary Brotherhood
- Foreign fighters in the Bosnian War
- Ustaše in Australia

== Sources ==
- Arnold, Guy (1999). Mercenaries: Scourge of the Developing World. Palgrave Macmillan UK. pp. 105–. ISBN 978-1-349-27708-7.
