= Swedish foreign fighters in the Syrian and Iraqi civil wars =

The Swedish military research facility has estimated that 300 individuals traveled from Sweden to serve as foreign fighters on behalf of ISIS and Jabhat al-Nusra in the Syrian Civil War, as well as in the Iraqi Civil War. The terrorism expert Magnus Norell claimed in an interview with Dagens Nyheter that the actual number might be twice as high. A law was passed in 2016 criminalizing traveling to conflict zones with the purpose of serving as a foreign fighter. As of May 2020, none of the Swedish foreign fighters have been convicted under the new ban on traveling with terroristic goals ("terrorresor"). The majority of jihadist foreign fighters departed to join ISIS and Jabat al-Nusra before the new law came into effect.

Critics claim that the judicial branch of the Swedish government is misusing its discretionary authority in choosing not to prosecute foreign fighters. The claim is that laws were in place long before 2016 that could allow for all foreign fighters to be charged, arguing that inaction from prosecutors has hindered relevant cases from being tested in court, as well as new legal precedents and interpretations of old laws from being established.

== Background ==
Sweden has a substantial migrant community with ties to the global south. This community consists of people who have either migrated themselves or whose parents have migrated from these regions. Many belonging to these communities still speak languages native to, or popular in, their countries of origin, share its culture and maintain ties of friendship and family too their own or their parents' native countries. These facts may have enabled the connection of the conflict within Syria and Iraq to Swedes belonging to migrant communities. It also enabled Swedes with an immigrant background to travel to the areas affected by the Syrian and Iraq civil war, with relative ease given they would have possessed knowledge of the language and customs. The immigrant communities of Sweden have maintained a distinct subculture. A value survey conducted by the newspaper Dagens Nyheter found that the traditional values are far stronger within immigrant communities compared to members of the majority culture. This gap in values resulted in national headlines when the feminist organization "Varken Hora eller kuvad" presented a survey conducted amongst youths within immigrant dominated areas of Sweden - in which slightly over 10% said they sympathized with ISIS. This low level of approval is similar to a broad dislike for ISIS within Muslim majority countries. Still Swedish state television reported that the polling results showing the 10% support for ISIS were high enough to "shock many".

The terrorism expert, Magnus Norell, stated in an interview with Dagens Nyheter that religious motivation, as well as seeing the war in Syria and Iraq within a larger whole as an ongoing conflict between Sunni and Shia Muslims, motivated minority Swedes with immigrant background to join the terrorist group and that ISIS is judged by its sympathizers to be a better alternative, compared to other local political actors within the middle east who are perceived as enemies of Islam. In contrast, there would ostensibly not be a historical connection for members of the Swedish majority culture to the historical conflict between Sunni and Shia and, therefore, they would not share the impression of Islam being under attack by powerful political actors. As a result, within the native majority culture of Sweden, the prospect of joining jihadist groups is seen as a foreign concept and highly immoral.

The Swedish Prime Minister Stefan Löfven referred to ISIS as "evil". The state radio broadcasting channel reported that sixty people were revealed to have liked an ISIS-friendly page on Facebook. This caused the legal spokesperson for the Liberals, at the time Roger Haddad, to express deep concern. The leader of the Left Party, Jonas Sjöstedt, stated that the crimes of ISIS are very serious. Despite Sweden's lack of laws on the subject, he speculated that these foreign fighters most probably could be prosecuted due to the seriousness of ISIS violations.

== Legal consequences ==
Despite strong reactions and the expressed will to broadly punish Jihadist foreign fighters, only two of those who have returned to Sweden have been sentenced for any crime. The newspaper Svenska Dagbladet reported that prosecution of foreign fighters would be difficult or even impossible.[12] The Swedish public broadcasting, SVT, reported that those who had returned from serving violent Islamist groups in other countries constitute an ongoing threat to Sweden. Despite this the legal framework hinders most prosecution. The defense attorney Thomas Olsson told the Swedish public broadcaster, SVT that the current legal framework lacked almost all potency in fighting terrorism. Critics claim that the current legal framework is not insufficient in itself and that foreign fighter could be prosecuted.

The lawyers Sten De Geer and Kjell Jönsson, have stated in a joint opinion piece that foreign fighters can and should be prosecuted on the charges of aiding terrorism. Meaning that the current doctrine of only seeking to punish those who have admitted or can be proven to have committed concrete violent actions is not the only or definitive interpretation of Swedish law. They state that these foreign fighters could all be charged for assisting others in criminal activity, an action that has been penalized within the Swedish legal code since long before any of the foreign fighters departed Sweden to join Jihadist groups. They argue that all who departed from Sweden to join violent jihadist groups in Syria or Iraq could be prosecuted.

The legal expert Dick Sundevall has stated the same thesis in an opinion piece published in the legal magazine Paragraf. The organization "Demokrati och upprättelse" established itself in late 2019 as an activist group working for the prosecution of all foreign fighters who joined ISIS. The group's founders presented their legal casework to a former judge, Krister Thelin, who concurred that their claim stands on strong legal ground. The Economist has also claimed in one of its informational videos that even going to live in ISIS territory is a crime under EU law.

== Accusation of Swedish negligence enabling terrorism ==
The Swedish-Arabic doctor Nemam Ghafouri is known for traveling to ISIS-controlled territories in order to help smuggle out captives held as slaves, saving them at his personal risk. She has stated that foreign fighters who have chosen to serve ISIS within the conflict-zone are all guilty of assisting others in committing crimes. She states that, in her judgment, they are all guilty of participating in genocide. She further accuses the Swedish government of sharing a degree of guilt, due to its refusal to prosecute foreign fighters. The terrorist Khaled Shahadeh, who was documented as having traveled abroad to join ISIS, returned to Sweden in order to treat injuries sustained in his service to the terrorist group. After receiving medical attention in Sweden, he traveled to the conflict zone to serve as a combatant for ISIS once again. The Swedish Financial Supervisory Authority also reported that almost all known Jihadist foreign fighters traveling from Sweden have committed welfare fraud, receiving government benefits on false premises during their time within the conflict zone. Peter Omtzigt, representing the Council of Europe, has stated that "a number of [member-]states do not [as a] standard prosecute people who have been members of ISIS and return to their own countries. That is wrong, but it is also dangerous. In Europe, there are no borders. So if only one country does not take actions, our whole safety is in danger." The Kurdish liberation unit is unwilling to hand over IS-members to Swedish authorities, due to them fearing that they won't be punished.
