= Karim Said Atmani =

Moroccan forger

- Born: Morocco
- Detained at: France
- Charge: forging identity documents
- Penalty: served four years in France

Karim Said Atmani (Arabic: كريم سعيد عثماني, also Abu Isham, Abu Hisham) was alleged to be a document-forger for the Groupe islamique armé, and shared an apartment with Ahmed Ressam.

He frequently travelled to Bosnia, and held both Bosnian and Moroccan passports. In Bosnia he fought in a North African brigade led by Abdelkader Mokhtari, another veteran of the GIA. Evan Kohlmann claimed that, in addition, in 1994 and 1995, he "was officially tasked with organizing the transfer of foreign guerillas to Bosnia from staging points in Milan and elsewhere in Europe."

According to Kohlmann, after the signing of the Dayton Accords, in Bosnia, from 1995, to his capture in 1999, Atmani held key support roles. Kohlmann claimed he was Fateh Kamel's "right hand man", and was also close to Abu el-Ma'ali. According to Kohlmann, Italian police found evidence of telephone calls between Atmani and el-Ma'ali, when they raided Milan's Islamic Cultural Institute. According to Kohlmann, during a 1995 raid of Sheikh Anwar Shaaban's office they found a fraudulent passport bearing Atmani's photo.00

A Moroccan living illegally in Montreal since 1995, In 1999, he was arrested by the Royal Canadian Mounted Police in Niagara on the Lake, along with an associate believed to be smuggling guns.

After being convicted of colluding with Osama bin Laden by a French court, he was released early for good behavior. In 2015, Atmani was suspected of having aided attackers by supplying forged passports.
