= Foreign support in the Bosnian War =

Foreign support in the Bosnian War included the funding, training or military support by foreign states and organizations outside Yugoslavia to any of the belligerents in the Bosnian War (1992–95).

== Support to Bosniaks ==
- Albania became a transit point for arms to the Bosniaks. As Berisha later admitted in an interview with the Italian newspaper Corriere Della Sera, Albania also provided some of its own ammunition at the time to what he called "friendly states."
- Iran, a predominantly Shia country, was one of the first Muslim countries to provide support for the Bosniaks, who are mainly Sunni Muslim) in the war. The Islamic Revolutionary Guard Corps (IRGC) sent more than five (5,000 to 14,000 tons from May 1994 to January 1996 alone) thousand tonnes of arms to the Bosniaks. IRGC also supplied trainers and advisers for the Bosnian military and intelligence service. Several dozen Iranian intelligence experts joined the Bosniak intelligence agency. The Iranian Ministry of Intelligence-supported mujahideen units trained selected Bosnian army units. The Hezbollah (Lebanese Shia), supported by Iran, also sent fighters to the war. In 1992, Iran with the help of Turkey smuggled arms to the Bosniaks. Reports of "hundreds of tons of weapons" shipped from Iran over a period of months appeared in the media in early 1995. Iranian arms were shipped through Croatia. Robert Baer, a CIA agent stationed in Sarajevo during the war, later claimed that "In Sarajevo, the Bosnian Muslim government is a client of the Iranians . . . If it's a choice between the CIA and the Iranians, they'll take the Iranians any day." By the war's end, public opinion polls showed some 86% of the Bosniak population expressed a positive attitude toward Iran. According to the scholar Cees Wiebes, during the war “Turkey and Saudi Arabia were very willing to deliver weapons and to lure Alija Izetbegović away from Iran, but the orientation of the Bosnian government was far more towards Iran.”
- Pakistan's Inter Services Intelligence (ISI) supplied the Bosniaks with arms, ammunition and guided anti-tank missiles. Pakistan defied the UN's ban on supply of arms to the war (declaring it illegal, among other Muslim countries) and ISI airlifted anti-tank guided missiles to the Bosniaks. Pakistan financially aided the Bosniaks.
- Saudi Arabia assisted the Bosnian Muslims with funding, arms and volunteer fighters. Military operations were funded and supported by the Saudi High Commission (SHC), founded by Saudi prince Salman bin Abdul-Aziz. Saudi Arabia provided $300 million in arms supplies (and $500 in humanitarian aid) to the Bosnian government, in violation to the embargo and with the knowing of the United States.
- Turkey actively supported the Bosniaks. It assisted Iran with smuggling arms to the Bosniaks. The Turkish line included arms and money also from Saudi Arabia, Malaysia, Brunei and Pakistan. Turkish private individuals and groups financially supported the Bosnian Muslims, and some hundreds of Turks joined as volunteers. Greatest private aid came from Islamist groups, such as the Refah Party and IHH. As a NATO member, Turkey supported and participated in NATO operations, including sending 18 F-16 planes. It was the first of the member countries to call for military intervention, and backed all US calls for engagement, and strongly supported air strikes. It has been noted though, that financial aid from the Turkish government was minimal.
- Malaysia supported the Bosniaks through financial aid and arms.
- Brunei supported the Bosniaks through financial aid and arms. It officially supported the Bosnian Muslims and spoke against the Bosnian Serbs. It was widely reported that Brunei helped in the purchase and delivery of shipments of small arms.
- Sudan financially aided the Bosniaks.
- The United States took no actions against the smuggling of arms, of which they knew. The CIA funded, trained and supplied the Bosnian Army. EU intelligence sources suggested that the US organized arms shipments to Bosnia through Muslim allies. The private military contractor MPRI, approved by the US government, used money provided by pro-Western Islamic countries such as Saudi Arabia, UAE, Kuwait, Brunei and Malaysia to equip the Bosnian army with 46,000 rifles, 1,000 machine guns, 80 APCs, 45 tanks, 840 anti-tank guns and 15 helicopters. The MPRI received $300 million to equip and $50 million to train the Bosnian army.
- NATO, headed by the United States, intervened through air operations.

Among foreign Islamist organizations supporting the Bosniaks included Al-Qaeda (including Bosnian branch), Harkat ul-Ansar, Refah Party, Armed Islamic Group of Algeria, and others. Among foreign non-profit organizations and charitable trusts were the Saudi Benevolence International Foundation (Al-Qaeda) and al-Haramain Foundation (Al-Qaeda-associated), the Turkish IHH, and others. The Third World Relief Agency (TWRA) based in Vienna was the "main financier and mediator" in the arms smuggling. The TWRA received $350 million from deposits by Saudi Arabia, Iran, Sudan, Turkey, Brunei, Malaysia and Pakistan.

== Support to Bosnian Croats ==
- Bosnian Croats received external support from foreign volunteers who came from Western Europe, the Croatian diaspora, and Catholic countries in Eastern Europe.

== Support to Bosnian Serbs ==
- Russia followed Western policy, but had reservations against some policies, such as NATO air strikes, which it believed was beyond UN resolutions. It tried to moderate anti-Serb decisions in discussions with Western powers. A number of Russian politicians showed solidarity with the Serbs. Hundreds of Russians volunteered on the Serb side.
- Greece: The Greek Volunteer Guard (Serbian: Грчка Добровољачка Гарда; Greek: Ελληνική Εθελοντική Φρουρά) was a unit of Greek volunteers that fought in the Bosnian War on the side of the Army of the Republika Srpska. Some members of the unit are alleged to have been present in the area of the Srebrenica Massacre and reportedly hoisted a Greek flag over the town, which was videoed ‘for marketing purposes’. Greece didn't participate in NATO strikes on Serb held territory, and there was even minimal financial aid, but not from the Greek government, rather from Greek organisations which saw Serbs as Christian brethren and thus ought to help their war cause.
- Israel, while publicly taking a neutral stance regarding the conflict, reportedly provided secret support to Serb forces by sending them weapons and material. Mossad, the Israeli intelligence service, also reportedly armed and funded Serbian groups. Israeli weapons and supplies were found among Serbian militia in Bosnia and Herzegovina.

== Foreign fighters ==
Volunteers came to fight for a variety of reasons including religious or ethnic loyalties and in some cases for money. As a general rule, Bosniaks received support from Islamic countries, Serbs from Eastern Orthodox countries, and Croats from Catholic countries.

== See also ==
- Sanctions against Yugoslavia
- United Nations Protection Force (UNPROFOR), UN peacekeeping
- Stabilisation Force in Bosnia and Herzegovina (SFOR), NATO-led peacekeeping

== Sources ==
Books

- Bennett, Richard (2012). Espionage: Spies and Secrets. Ebury Publishing. pp. 54–. ISBN 978-1-4481-3214-0.
- Burg, Steven L.; Shoup, Paul S. (1999). The War in Bosnia-Herzegovina: Ethnic Conflict and International Intervention. M.E. Sharpe. ISBN 978-1-56324-308-0.
- Curtis, Mark (2010). Secret Affairs: Britain's Collusion with Radical Islam. Profile Books. ISBN 978-1-84668-763-1.
- Hunter, Shireen T. (2016). God on Our Side: Religion in International Affairs. Rowman & Littlefield Publishers. ISBN 978-1-4422-7259-0.
- O'Hern, Steven (2012). Iran's Revolutionary Guard: The Threat That Grows While America Sleeps. Potomac Books, Inc. pp. 82–. ISBN 978-1-59797-701-2.
- Shay, Shaul (2017). Islamic Terror and the Balkans. Taylor & Francis. pp. 94–. ISBN 978-1-351-51138-4.

Journals

- Demirtaş-Çoşkun, B., 2011. Turkish foreign policy toward the Bosnian war (1992–1995): A constructive analysis. Karadeniz Araştırmaları Dergisi, 18, pp. 1–18.

News articles

- "America used Islamists to arm the Bosnian Muslims". The Guardian. 22 April 2002.
- "U.S. Allies' Arms Aid to Bosnia Detailed". LA Times.
- Bardos, Gordon N. (February 2013). "Iran in the Balkans: A History and a Forecast". World Affairs. Archived from the original on 2016-11-29.
- Sciolino, Elaine (10 December 1995). "What's Iran Doing In Bosnia, Anyway?". The World. NY Times.
