= Fateh Kamel =

Algerian-Canadian convicted terrorist

- Born: 1961 (age 64–65); El Harrach, Algeria
- Penalty: Eight years imprisonment
- Status: Released early for good behaviour

Fateh Kamel is an Algerian who was arrested in 1999 on charges of supporting a terrorist plot against attacks against French targets in Paris, and was sentenced to eight years' imprisonment.

He was released early for good behaviour, and returned to Canada.

== Early life ==
Kamel is believed to have fought the Soviet Invasion of Afghanistan, and moved to Canada in 1987 or 1988.

He married a schoolteacher in Quebec, and was granted Canadian citizenship in 1993, and owned the Artisanat Nord-Sud Craft Store in Montreal.

In the Bosnian War, he was injured in the foot while fighting in Bosnia. Evan Kohlmann has suggested that he served as third-in-command of a Zenica mujahideen battalion during 1995 under Abdelkader Mokhtari.

Described as possessing a "slick, polished exterior" and "especially handsome", he traveled between Milan, Montreal, Paris, Hamburg, Frankfurt, Zagreb, Bosnia, Copenhagen, Australia, Slovenia, Freibourg, Morocco, Acone, Istanbul, Belgium and Amsterdam over a period of three years from 1994–97.

In 1996, he stated to friends that he would "prefer to die than go to jail", speaking of how he almost lost his wife and newborn son. When authorities pursued French militant Christophe Caze, it was discovered that his address book contained the contact information of Kamel.

Returning to Canada, he is alleged to have led a group of radical Montreal Islamists, including Ahmed Ressam. In 1991 he is believed to have attended an Afghan training camp, and returned to Montreal where he stole money and identity documents to support his group's plans to bomb Parisian metro stations, and a series of attacks in the city of Roubaix.

== Arrest ==
He was arrested in Jordan in March 1999, and extradited to France, where he was convicted and sentenced to eight years' imprisonment for providing false passports in support of terrorism.

After his early release from prison for good behaviour, he returned to Montreal in January 2005, where he was living with his wife and son until Canada brought deportation orders against him.

== Return to Canada ==
Kamel returned to Canada on January 29, 2005. Conservative Public Safety critic Peter MacKay urged the government to revoke his citizenship and deport the "bad dude" to Algeria. Some critics alleged he was being allowed to return simply to allow the Canadian Security Intelligence Service to track his movements to discover future plots.

Five months after returning to Canada, Kamel applied for a passport explaining that he needed to fly to Thailand on a business trip. On November 30, Pierre Pettigrew wrote an internal memo suggesting the application be denied. The Harper government exercised Royal prerogative when it denied Kamel a new passport. In March 2008, Federal Court justice Simon Noel ruled that this had infringed Kamel's rights under the Canadian Charter.

However, the ruling was set aside by the Federal Court of Appeal in January 2009 in which the court unanimously agreed the denial of passport on national security ground is justified, despite the arguments of lawyer Johanne Doyon. Kamel launched an appeal to the Supreme Court of Canada but the court declined to hear his case and thus ends the legality challenge of the Canadian Passport Order.

In 2010, Kamel attempted to re-apply for a Canadian Passport but was once again refused by the Minister on grounds of national security. He sought judicial review but was dismissed by the Federal Court and subsequently, by the Federal Court of Appeal in 2013.
