= Abdelkader Mokhtari =

Algerian Islamist

Abdelkader Mokhtari (kunya: Abu el-Ma'ali, The Gendarme; died October 2015) was an Algerian commander who became a "sacred legend" for the Bosnian mujahideen in the Bosnian War.

== Bosnia ==
Evan Kohlmann claimed that Mokhtari, an Algerian, came to Bosnia with experience from his time in the Armed Islamic Group. He also stated that Mokhtari was serving as second-in-command of a Zenica battalion, under the command of Anwar Shaaban with Fateh Kamal as his right-hand man in 1995, Kohlmann has also stated that Kamal visited 16 countries during that time. Kohlmann later claimed that a 1997 French report suggested that Mokhtari had managed to keep a cache of SA-7 missiles after the Dayton Accords, due to his protection and status with President Alija Izetbegović.

In 1996, some sources suggested that Mokhtari was leading the 3rd Corps, known as the Gazi'a Force, an Arabic term for retribution, which incorporated formerly independent mujahideen units into a single force. Other reports suggest he only led the training portion of the Corps, known as U-Force.

Karim Said Atmani served under his command during the Bosnian war.

== Later activities ==
In 1999, the United States conditioned assistance to the Armed Forces of Bosnia and Herzegovina, demanding that the country first hand over Mokhtari to their custody. While Izetbegović initially refused, he subsequently agreed to expel Mokhtari from the country, rather than deport him to the United States.

In 2005, Mokhtari was interviewed by a Bosnian magazine about his perspective on the trial against Abduladhim Maktouf, a Mujahideen alleged to have been involved in the mistreatment of Croatian prisoners. Mokhtari noted that he had married a Bosnian wife.

== Death ==
Mokhtari died in Oran in October 2015. Salat al-Janazah was performed on 26 October 2015.
