= Thomas Crowley (soldier) =

Irish volunteer in Croatia (1949–1995)

- Born: 14 February 1949
- Died: 10 June 1995 (aged 46); Near Dubrovnik, Croatia
- Burial place: Split, Croatia
- Military career
- Allegiance: UK; Croatia
- Branch: British Army; Croatian Defence Forces
- Service years: 1967–1991 (British Army); 1991–1995 (Croatia)
- Rank: Major (Bojnik)
- Nickname: Tomislav Kraulić
- Service number: 006968 (Croatian Defence Forces)
- Units: Special Air Service; IX. battalion Rafael Vitez Boban
- Conflicts: Vietnam War (claimed); Gulf War; Croatian War of Independence; Siege of Dubrovnik; Operation Maslenica; Siege of Mostar
- Awards: Order of Petar Zrinski and Fran Krsto Frankopan

Thomas Crowley (14 February 1949 – 10 June 1995) was an Irishman who fought in the Croatian War of Independence.

== Biography ==
Initially a member of the British Army, he travelled to Croatia in 1991 and joined as a volunteer with the Croatian Defence Forces. He was assigned to the Ante Paradžik First Battalion, and participated as a commando in battles at Dubrovnik, Livno, Mostar, Popovo Polje, Operation Maslenica, and the liberation of Škabrnja. He was wounded at Zemunik.

In 1994 he led a training camp for the 114th brigade which trained more than 2,000 soldiers.

Tomislav Kraulić (his other nickname which would be Croatian version of Thomas Crowley) was shy and rarely talked about himself. In his request for Croatian citizenship he wrote: "I came to Croatia to fight for its freedom. I would like to stay here after the war is over and live here if I survive. I like Croatia and Croatian people. This is my home."

He was killed in action near Dubrovnik in 1995 and is buried near Split. Upon his death he held the rank of Major in the Croatian Defence Forces and in 2012 was posthumously awarded the Croatian Order of Petar Zrinski and Fran Krsto Frankopan.

In June 2025, his family came from South Africa and visited his grave at the Lovrinac cemetery in Split, his mural in the Matica hrvatska Street as well commemorative academy in the Croatian Army's Home (Dom hrvatske vojske), where documentary on his life was shown.
